= List of people from Angeles City =

The following is a list of people who are born, who resides or have resided in the city of Angeles, Philippines.

== Arts ==
- Lea Salonga is a Tony Award-winning singer and actress who is best known for her portrayal of Kim in the musical, Miss Saigon. She spent the first six years of her childhood in Angeles City before moving to Manila.
- apl.de.ap, born Allan Pineda Lindo in Sapang Bato, Angeles City, is a member of the Grammy award-winning group The Black Eyed Peas. He is famous throughout the Filipino community after the release of his life story of his homeland the Philippines in a song called "The Apl Song" found on the Peas' 2003 album, Elephunk.
- Kelsey Merritt is a Filipino-American model best known for being the first Filipino to walk in the Victoria's Secret Fashion Show and to appear in the pages of the Sports Illustrated Swimsuit Issue.
- Vanessa Minnillo is an American television personality born in Clark Air Base, Angeles City, and raised in Seattle, Washington, and Charleston, South Carolina. She was Miss Teen USA 1998 and was a host on MTV's Total Request Live.
- Efren "Bata" Reyes, referred to as "The Magician", is a very popular Filipino pool player. He is a former world champion and considered to be one of history's greatest practitioners of pool.
- Hilda Koronel, born Susan Reid, is an actress who starred in around 45 films, many of which are critically acclaimed, since 1970. Her father is an American who was a serviceman in Clark Air Base.
- Pepe Smith is a Filipino singer-songwriter, drummer and guitarist, and is considered an icon of original Filipino rock music or "Pinoy rock".
- Antoinette Taus, Filipino-American television/movie/theater actress, singer, host and commercial model.
- Kit Thompson is a Filipino-Kiwi actor, model, and television host.
- Jaclyn Jose, born Mary Jane Sta. Ana Guck, and known for her memorable roles in the films Salome and Santa Juana, is a versatile cinematic and television actress having captured best actress accolades in both local and foreign scenes.
- Antonio Aquitania is a Filipino actor and model
- Jesse Lloyd Flake Lapid is a film and television actor, film director and instructor trainer of CMAS Philippines
- Conrado del Rosario is an internationally multi awarded composer and musician who was born in Angeles City. He studied music and worked as a composer/musician in Berlin, Germany from 1981 before returning to his city of birth in 2013 where he now continues his musical activities.
- Donald Geisler, Filipino taekwondo athlete.
- Baron Geisler, Filipino actor.
- Cris Judd is an American actor. He has choreographed for Michael Jackson and Usher, but he is best known for having been married to American actress/singer Jennifer Lopez. He spent his childhood years at Clark Air Base.
- Donita Rose born Donita Rose Cavett is a famous local television host and a former MTV VJ in Asia. Although born in Utah, U.S., she moved to Angeles City, where her American father was stationed at the U.S. base, when she was five years old.
- Aljur Abrenica, Filipino actor, dancer, model and singer. He appeared on the fourth season of StarStruck.
- Vin Abrenica, Filipino actor who appeared as a contestant on the reality-based talent search show Artista Academy and later won the competition with Sophie Albert.
- Rufa Mae Quinto, actress
- Ryzza Mae Dizon is a Filipina child actress and television host. She rose to fame by way of the competition 'Little Miss Philippines 2012', associated with the noontime show Eat Bulaga!. She works as a co-host on Eat Bulaga! and once hosted the morning talk show The Ryzza Mae Show.
- Whitney Tyson, Filipino actress and comedian.
- Jameson Blake, Filipino actor and member of Hashtags.
- Crisostomo Yalung, second Bishop of the Diocese of Antipolo, Rizal
- GB Callister, Filipino author. Released first novel Santa Carmela in 2018.
- Ronnie Liang, Filipino singer
- Francesca Taruc, Filipina model
- RJ Padilla, Filipino actor
- Kylie Padilla, Filipina actress
- Jean Garcia, a Filipina television actress, model and dancer

== Business ==
- Janet Lazatin, Filipino academic administrator, business executive and licensed real estate broker
- Peter Valdes is an American-based software entrepreneur who was awarded one of the "10 Most Inspiring Technopreneurs in the Philippines in 2006". He was a co-founder of the globally successful Tivoli Software (an IBM Company).

== Media and journalism ==
- Kristine Johnson is a co-anchor at WCBS-TV, making her the first Filipino-American to serve as the face of a major network newscast in New York and the entire U.S. East Coast. She was previously an anchor of Early Today and Weekend Today. She was born at Clark Air Base, and currently resides in New Jersey with her husband and two children.
- Ivan Mayrina, Filipino journalism

== Politics ==
- Servillano Aquino was a Filipino general during the Philippine Revolution against Spain (1896–1898) and the Philippine–American War (1898–1902). He served as a delegate to the Malolos Congress and was the grandfather of Benigno "Ninoy" Aquino, Jr.
- Alex Cauguiran, Filipino politician and activist
- Carmelo Lazatin Sr., Filipino politician and businessman
- Carmelo Lazatin II, Filipino politician and businessman
- Rafael Lazatin, Filipino politician and businessman
- Maricel Morales, Filipino actress, beauty queen and politician
- Bryan Matthew Nepomuceno, Filipino lawyer and politician
- Francis Nepomuceno, Filipino politician
- Francisco Nepomuceno, Filipino politician
- Juanita Nepomuceno, Filipino lawyer and politician
- Edgardo Pamintuan Sr., Filipino lawyer and politician
- Edu Pamintuan, Filipino politician and businessman
- JC Parker Aguas, Filipino politician and former actress
- Amos Rivera, Filipino politician and businessman
- Vicky Vega, Filipino politician and actress

== Sports ==
- Calvin Abueva is a local basketball player, played for San Sebastian College in the NCAA and the NLEX Roadwarriors in the Philippine Basketball D-League. He is now an Magnolia Hotshots star player in the PBA. He was selected NCAA's Most Valuable Player (Season 87) and PBA Rookie of the year 2013.
- Russel Escoto, Filipino basketball player
- Victonara Galang is a Filipino volleyball athlete. She recently an Open Hitter and the team captain of the De La Salle University Lady Spikers.
- Rodolfo Luat is one of the highest-ranking pool players of the Philippines. Popularly known as "Boy Samson" since the 1970s because of his powerful break, he holds many Asian individual and team titles.
- Bruce McTavish, New Zealand-born naturalized Filipino who was an international boxing referee and philanthropist.
- Efren Reyes is an international and local billiard player also known as The Magician
- Arwind Santos is a local basketball player, played for Far Eastern University in the UAAP and the Magnolia Ice Cream Spinners in the Philippine Basketball League. He is now a NorthPort Batang Pier team player in the PBA. He was selected PBL's Most Valuable Player (2004), two-time UAAP's Most Valuable Player (2004–2005) and one-time UAAP's Most Valuable Player (2005).

== See also ==
- List of people from Pampanga
