= 2019 Angeles City local elections =

Philippine elections

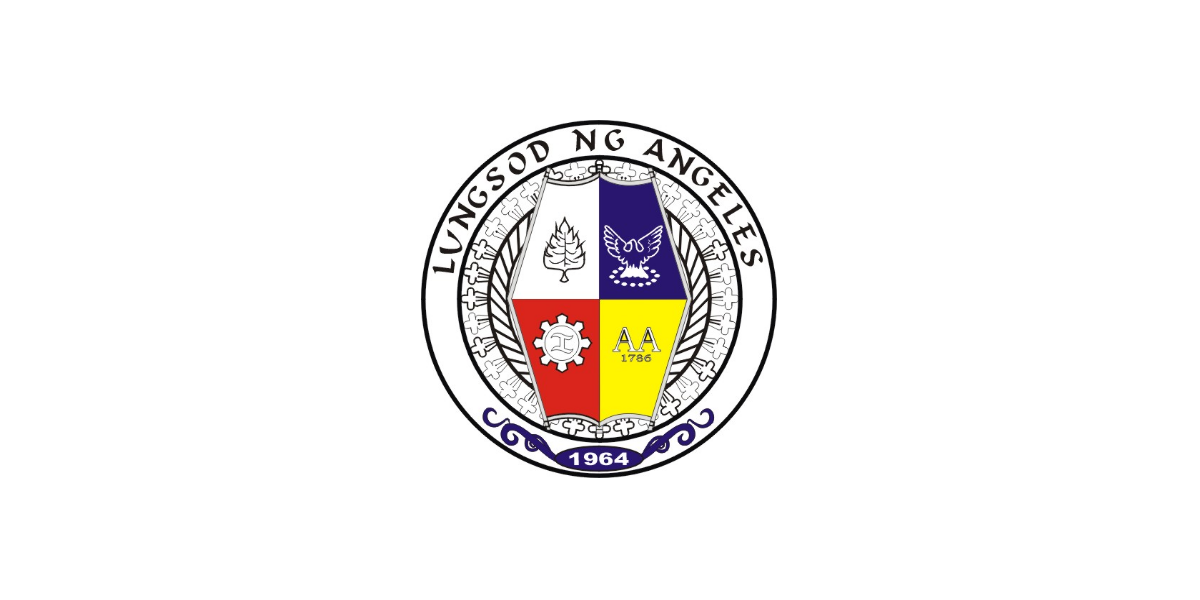
- May 13, 2019
- Mayoral election
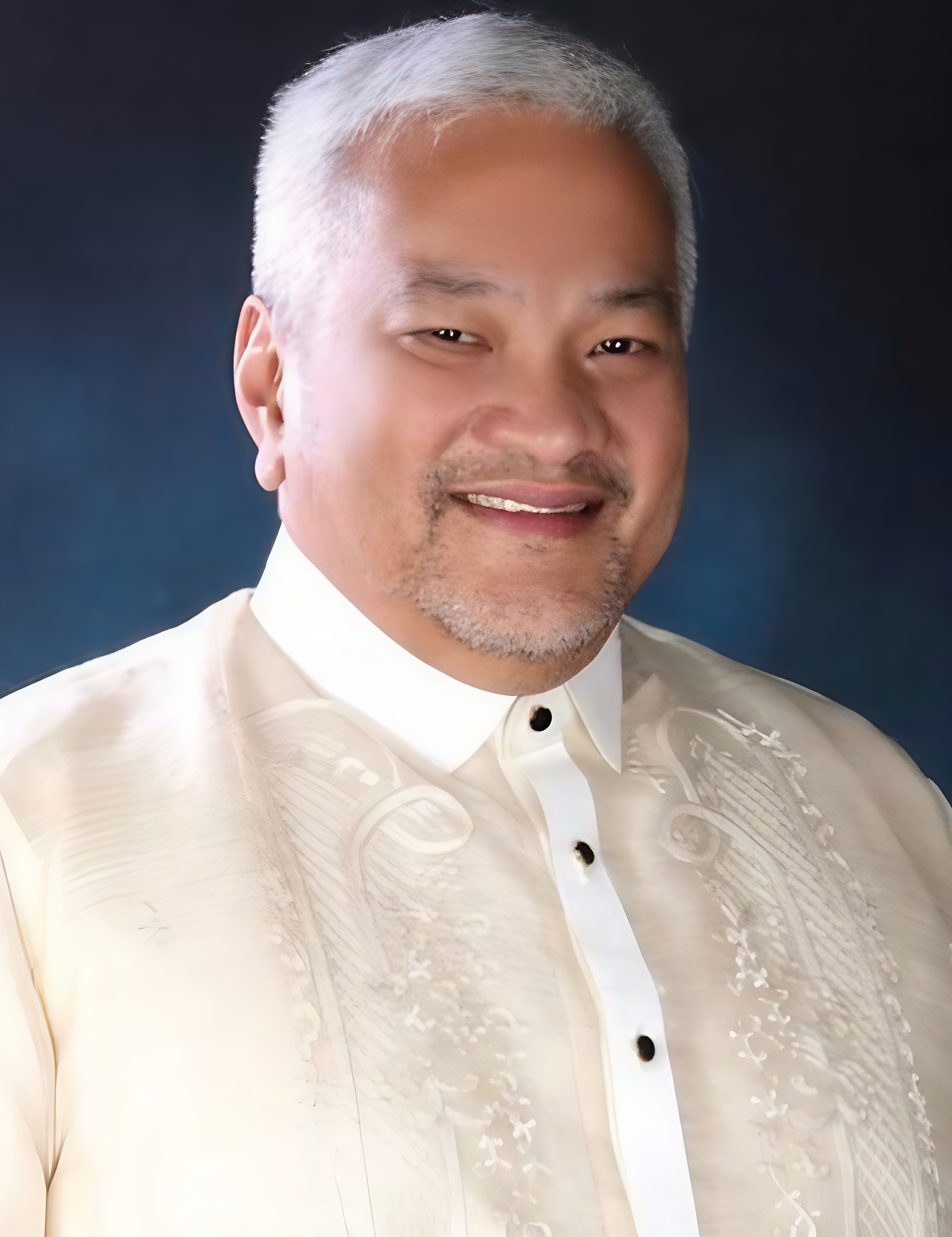

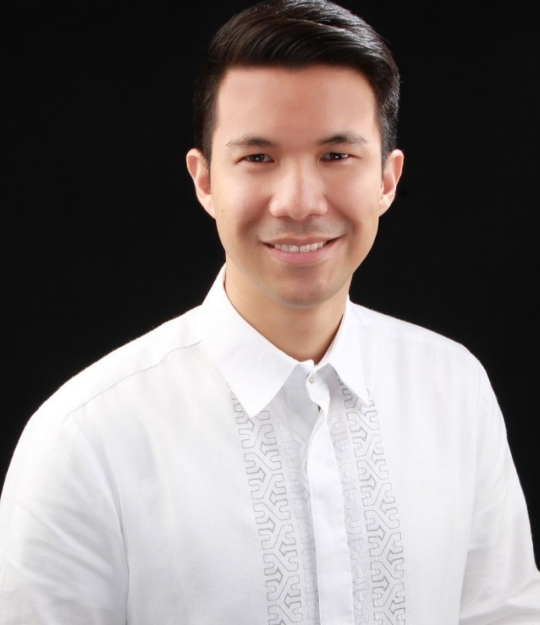

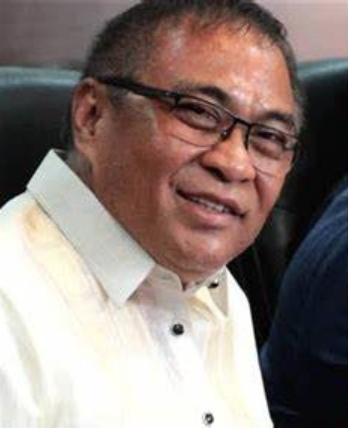
Candidate	Carmelo Lazatin Jr.	Bryan Matthew Nepomuceno	Alexander Cauguiran
Party	PFP	PAK/ABE	KAMBILAN
Running mate	Vicky Vega	Edu Pamintuan Jr.	Maricel Morales
Popular vote	59,192	45,711	26,109
Percentage	44.26%	34.18%	19.52%
Mayor before election
Edgardo Pamintuan Sr.
PAK/ABE
Elected mayor
Carmelo Lazatin Jr.
PFP
- Vice mayoral election
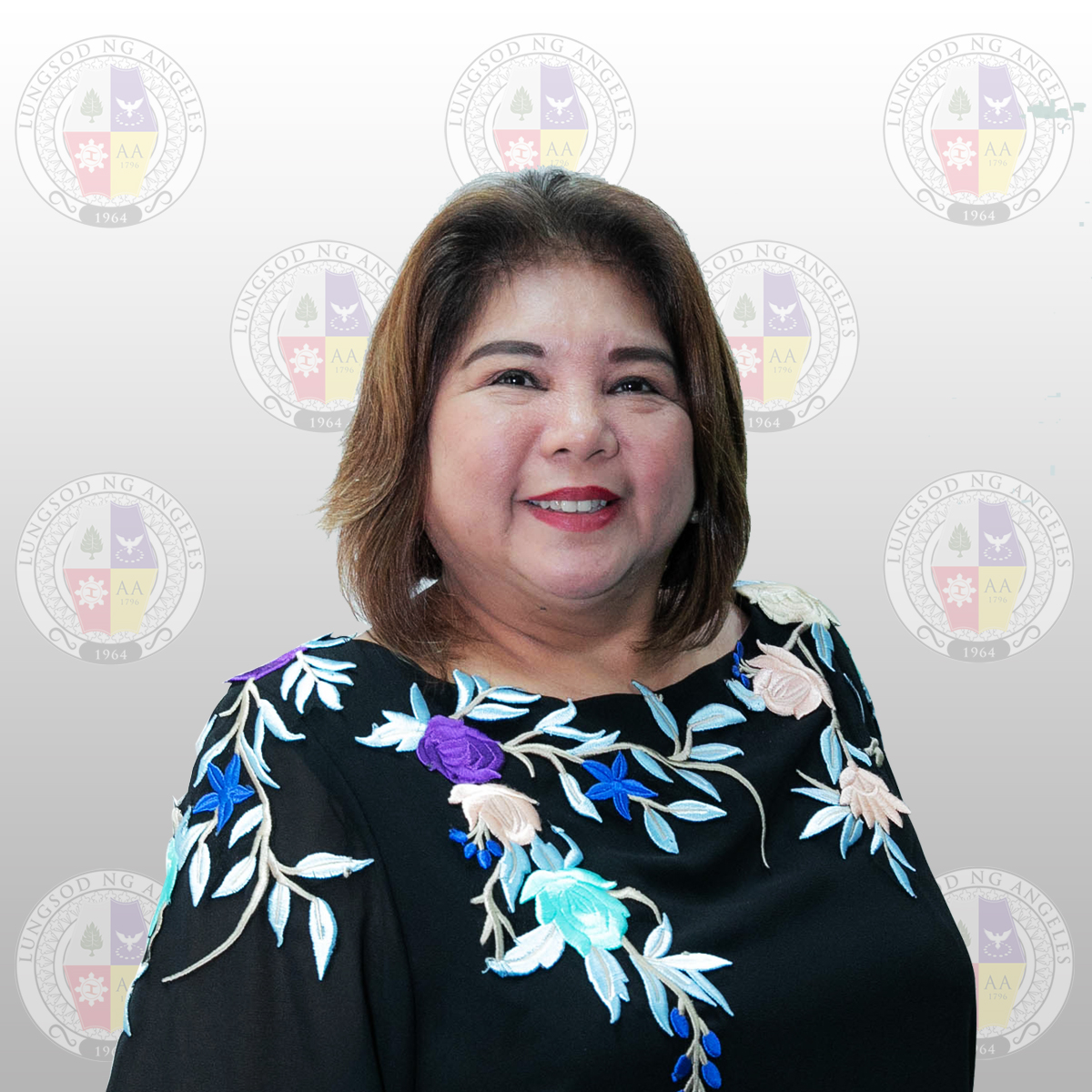

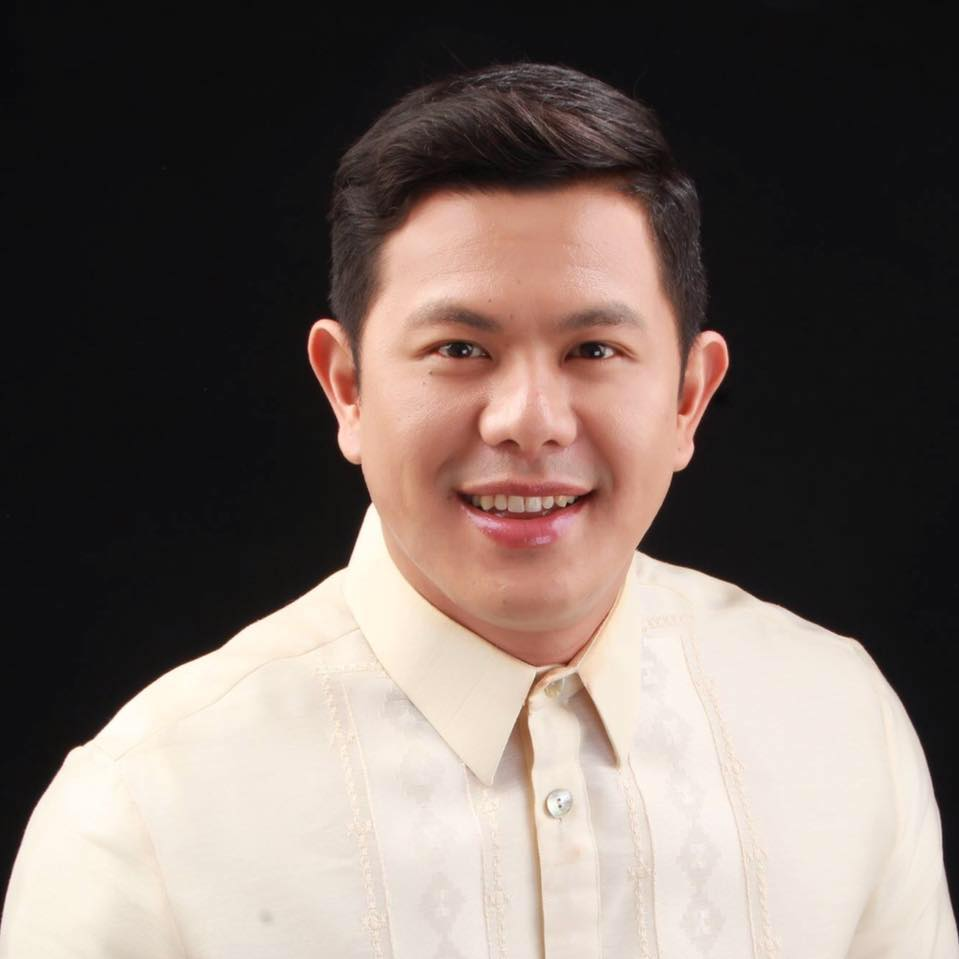

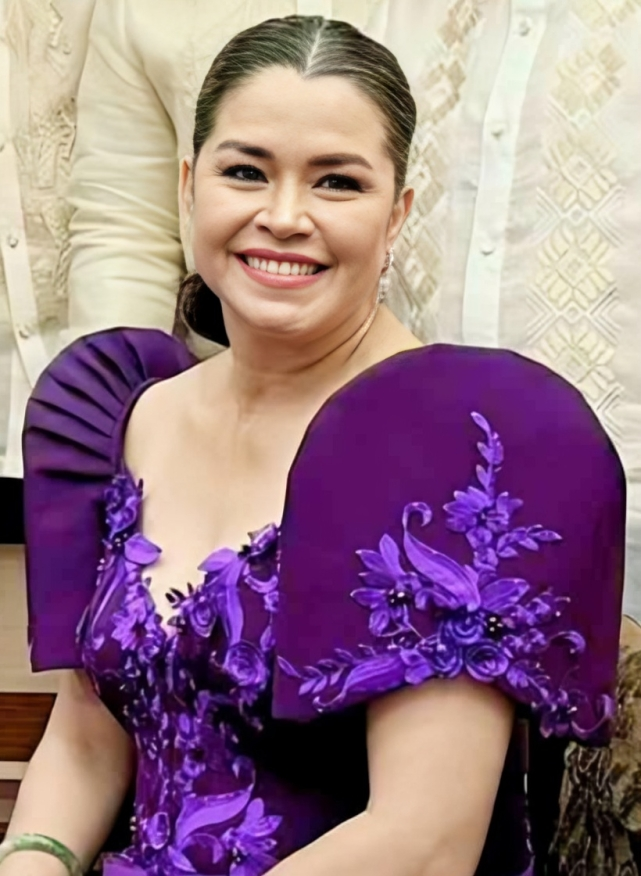
Candidate	Vicky Vega	Edu Pamintuan	Marang Morales
Party	PFP	PAK/ABE	KAMBILAN
Popular vote	55,874	48,116	26,903
Percentage	42.69%	36.76%	20.55%
Vice Mayor before election
Bryan Matthew Nepomuceno
PAK/ABE
Elected Vice Mayor
Vicky Vega
PFP
- City Council election

10 of 12 seats in the Angeles City Council 7 seats needed for a majority
	Majority party	Minority party	Third party
Party	PAK/ABE	PFP	KAMBILAN
Last election	7	0	0
Seats before	7	0	0
Seats won	7	2	1
Seat change	0	▲2	▲1

Local elections were held in Angeles City on May 13, 2019, as part of the 2019 Philippine general election. Angeles City voters will elect a mayor, a vice mayor, and 10 out of 12 councilors of the Angeles City Council.

The city had 198,777 registered voters and elected Carmelo Lazatin Jr. for the first time with a total of 59,192 votes. He was proclaimed mayor-elect on May 14, 2019.

== Background ==
This election marked the conclusion of Incumbent Mayor Edgardo Pamintuan Sr.'s tenure, as he had completed his three consecutive terms and was no longer eligible for re-election.

With Pamintuan stepping down, the mayoral race became highly contested, featuring three major candidates:

- Incumbent Vice Mayor Bryan Matthew Nepomuceno, who ran under the Partido Abe Kapampangan ticket alongside his running mate Edu Pamintuan, son of the outgoing mayor.
- Carmelo Lazatin Jr., an incumbent councilor and son of former First District Representative Carmelo "Tarzan" Lazatin, ran under the Partido Federal ng Pilipinas ticket with Vicky Vega-Cabigting as his running mate.
- Alexander Cauguiran, former OIC President of the Clark International Airport Corporation, ran under the KAMBILAN ticket alongside Filipino actress and former beauty queen Marang Morales.

== Results ==
The candidates for mayor and vice mayor with the highest number of votes wins the seat; they are voted separately; therefore, they may be of different parties when elected.

=== Mayoral Election ===
Parties are as stated in their certificate of candidacies.

Angeles City Mayoral Election
Party	Candidate	Votes	%
PFP	Carmelo Lazatin Jr.	59,192	44.26%
PAK/ABE	Bryan Matthew Nepomuceno	45,711	34.18%
KAMBILAN	Alexander Cauguiran	26,109	19.52%
Independent	Edel Morales	1,238	0.93%
Independent	Ryan David	1,104	3.98
Independent	Radito Tuazon	214	0.16%
Independent	Romerico David	156	0.12%
Total votes		133,724	100.00%
PFP gain from PAK/ABE			

=== Vice Mayoral Election ===
Parties are as stated in their certificate of candidacies.

Angeles City Vice Mayoralty Election
Party	Candidate	Votes	%
PFP	Vicky Vega	55,874	42.69%
PAK/ABE	Edu Pamintuan	48,116	36.76%
KAMBILAN	Marang Morales	26,903	20.55%
Total votes		130,893	100.00%
PFP gain from PAK/ABE			

=== City Council Election ===
Voters elected ten councilors to comprise the City Council or the Sangguniang Panlungsod. Candidates are voted for separately so winning candidates may come from different political parties. The ten candidates with the highest number of votes win the seats.

Angeles City Council Election
Party	Candidate	Votes	%
PFP	Pogs Suller	89,734	7.66
PAK/ABE	Danilo Lacson	66,685	5.69
PAK/ABE	PG Ponce	62,799	5.36
PAK/ABE	JC Parker Aguas	57,834	4.94
PAK/ABE	Joseph Alfie Bonifacio	56,748	4.85
PAK/ABE	Thelma Indiongco	52,867	4.51
PFP	Kap Niknok Bañola	49,659	4.24
PAK/ABE	Amos Rivera	48,430	4.13
KAMBILAN	Jay Sangil	45,697	3.90
PAK/ABE	Raco Paolo Del Rosario	43,547	3.72
PAK/ABE	Alma Mercado	39,275	3.35
PFP	Pinggoy Lopez	38,200	3.26
KAMBILAN	Jae Vincent Flores	34,554	2.95
PAK/ABE	Chris Cortez	32,039	2.73
PFP	Arvin Louie Nepomuceno	31,996	2.73
KAMBILAN	Rodelio Mamac	29,775	2.54
PFP	Angelito Indiongco	27,408	2.34
PFP	Rudy Simeon	25,191	2.15
PAK/ABE	Jose Aubrey Pelayo IV	25,078	2.14
PFP	Idy Pamintuan	24,093	2.06
KAMBILAN	Edward Laki	22,096	1.89
PFP	Philip Cesar Samson	18,326	1.56
KAMBILAN	Harvey Santiago	17,022	1.45
KAMBILAN	FR Sonny Pahed	16,893	1.44
PFP	Jezreel Aaron Pineda	15,374	1.31
Independent	Jordan Macapagal	10,260	0.88
Independent	Marco Ng	10,249	0.87
KAMBILAN	Jhune Angeles	6,727	0.57
Independent	Mario Operaña	5,446	0.46
Independent	Dok Bayan Madlangbayan	5,070	0.43
PDP–Laban	Camilo Bryan Eribal	4,379	0.37
Total votes		~117,106	100.00%
