= Amos Rivera =

Filipino politician and businessman (born 1977)

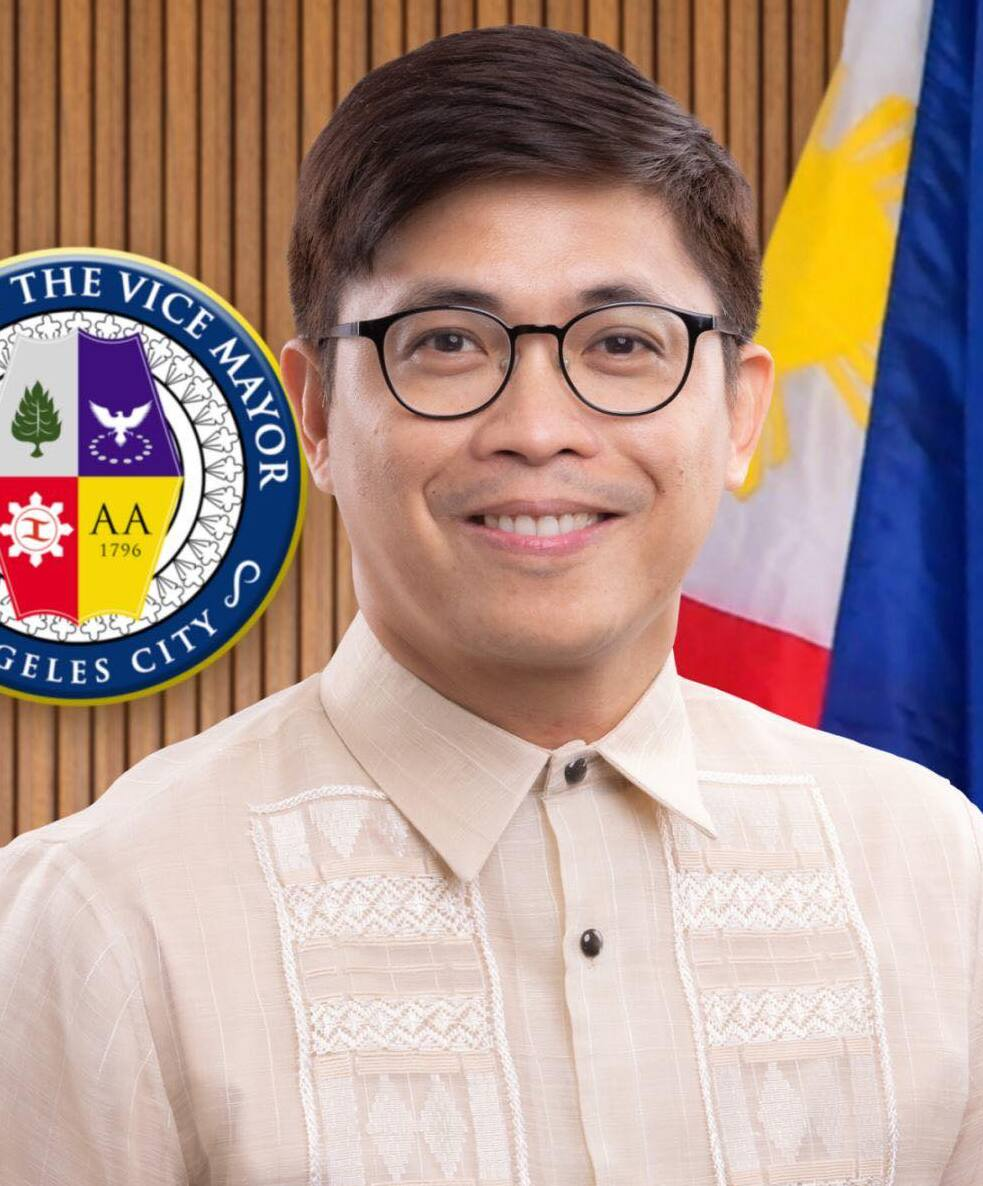
- Official portrait, 2025

Vice Mayor of Angeles City
- Incumbent
- Assumed office June 30, 2025
- Mayor: Carmelo Lazatin II
- Preceded by: Vicky Vega-Cabigting

Member of Angeles City Council
- In office June 30, 2013 – June 30, 2022

Personal details
- Born: Amos Bartolome Rivera; June 20, 1977 (age 49) Angeles City, Philippines
- Party: PRP (2024–present)
- Other political affiliations: Aksyon (2021–2024); PAK/ABE (2012–2021)
- Spouse: Magdalena Magat
- Children: 3
- Education: Holy Angel University
- Occupation: Politician, businessman

Amos Bartolome Rivera (born June 20, 1977) is a Filipino politician and businessman who has served as Vice Mayor of Angeles City since 2025, under the mayoralty of Carmelo Lazatin II, succeeding three-term incumbent Vicky Vega-Cabigting.

He previously served as a three-term member of the Angeles City Council from 2013 to 2022.

== Political career ==
=== Under Tarzan (1998–2013) ===
Rivera began his career in public service in 1998, serving as a Community Affairs Officer under then-Mayor Carmelo “Tarzan” Lazatin. He later held positions as Executive Assistant III and Officer-in-Charge of the Local Urban Poor Affairs and Housing Office (LUPAHO) until 2007.

==== LUPAHO Issue ====
Rivera conducted a ceremonial turnover of land titles to TB Pavilion residents in 2020, despite no longer being affiliated with the Local Urban Poor Affairs and Housing Office (LUPAHO). His brother, Atty. Willie Rivera, then City Administrator, claimed Amos had no authority to distribute the titles and accused him of misrepresenting his role. The City Government questioned why the Registry of Deeds released titles to Amos instead of LUPAHO, suggesting possible procedural violations.

=== City Councilor (2013–2022) ===
Rivera was elected City Councilor of Angeles City and later served as Chairman of the Committee on Urban Poor Affairs. During his tenure, he passed ordinances such as a local Solo Parents Act and land title facilitation projects. He purportedly helped over 20,000 informal settler families obtain land titles and wellness benefits.

=== Vice Mayor of Angeles City (2025–present) ===
On July 1, 2025, Rivera took an oath as vice mayor of Angeles City.

== Mayoral and Vice Mayoral campaign ==
=== 2022 Mayoral Campaign ===
Rivera ran for Mayor of Angeles City in the 2022 elections under Aksyon Demokratiko, opposing Carmelo “Pogi” Lazatin Jr. Despite highlighting his advocacy and projects, he was labeled the top absentee city councilor—missing 25 sessions out of 103 between July 2019 and October 2021. He was also criticized by LGBTQA+ groups for perceived rudeness and lack of clear platform presentation.

=== 2025 Vice Mayoral campaign ===
On May 12, 2025, Amos Rivera ran as vice mayoral candidate with Oscar Albayalde for mayor under People's Reform Party. He won the vice mayoralty with 79,866 votes (52.48%), defeating incumbent Vicky Vega-Cabigting of Lakas-CMD. Carmelo Lazatin II was proclaimed mayor. Rivera assumed office Presiding Officer of the Angeles City Council on June 30, 2025.

== Personal life ==
Rivera is married to Magdalena Magat and has three children. His brother Willie Rivera, also served as councilor of Angeles City.

== Electoral history ==
Electoral history of Amos Rivera
Year	Office	Party	Votes received				Result
Year	Office	Party	Total	%	P.	Swing	Result
2013	Councilor of Angeles City	PAK/ABE	40,004	36.84%	10th	—N/a	Won
2016	Councilor of Angeles City	PAK/ABE	52,449	—N/a	9th	—N/a	Won
2019	Councilor of Angeles City	PAK/ABE	48,430	4.13%	8th	—N/a	Won
2022	Mayor of Angeles City	Aksyon	43,193	29.49%	2nd	—N/a	Lost
2025	Vice Mayor of Angeles City	PRP	79,866	52.48%	1st	—N/a	Won

Political offices
Preceded by Vicky Vega-Cabigting	Vice Mayor of Angeles City; 2025–present	Incumbent
