= Carmelo Lazatin =

Carmelo Lazatin may refer to:

- Carmelo Lazatin Sr. (1934–2018), Filipino politician
- Carmelo Lazatin Jr. (born 1969), Filipino politician, son of Carmelo Sr., half-brother of Carmelo II.
- Carmelo Lazatin II (born 1970), Filipino politician, son of Carmelo Sr., half-brother of Carmelo Jr.
