= 2016 Angeles City local elections =

Philippine elections

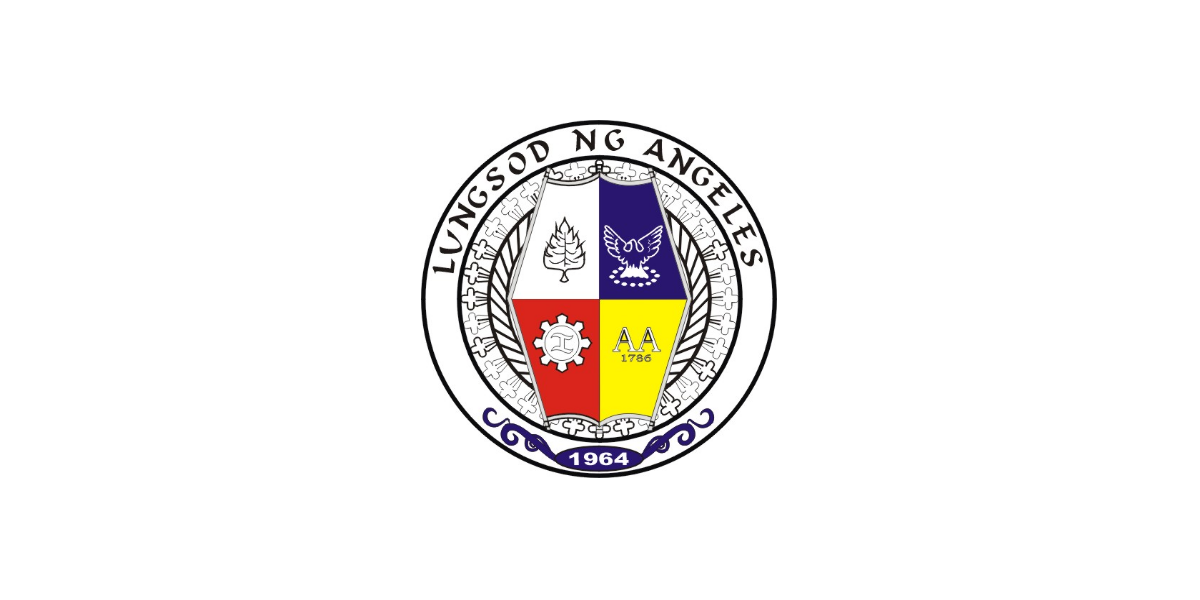
- May 9, 2016
- Mayoral election

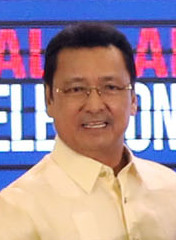

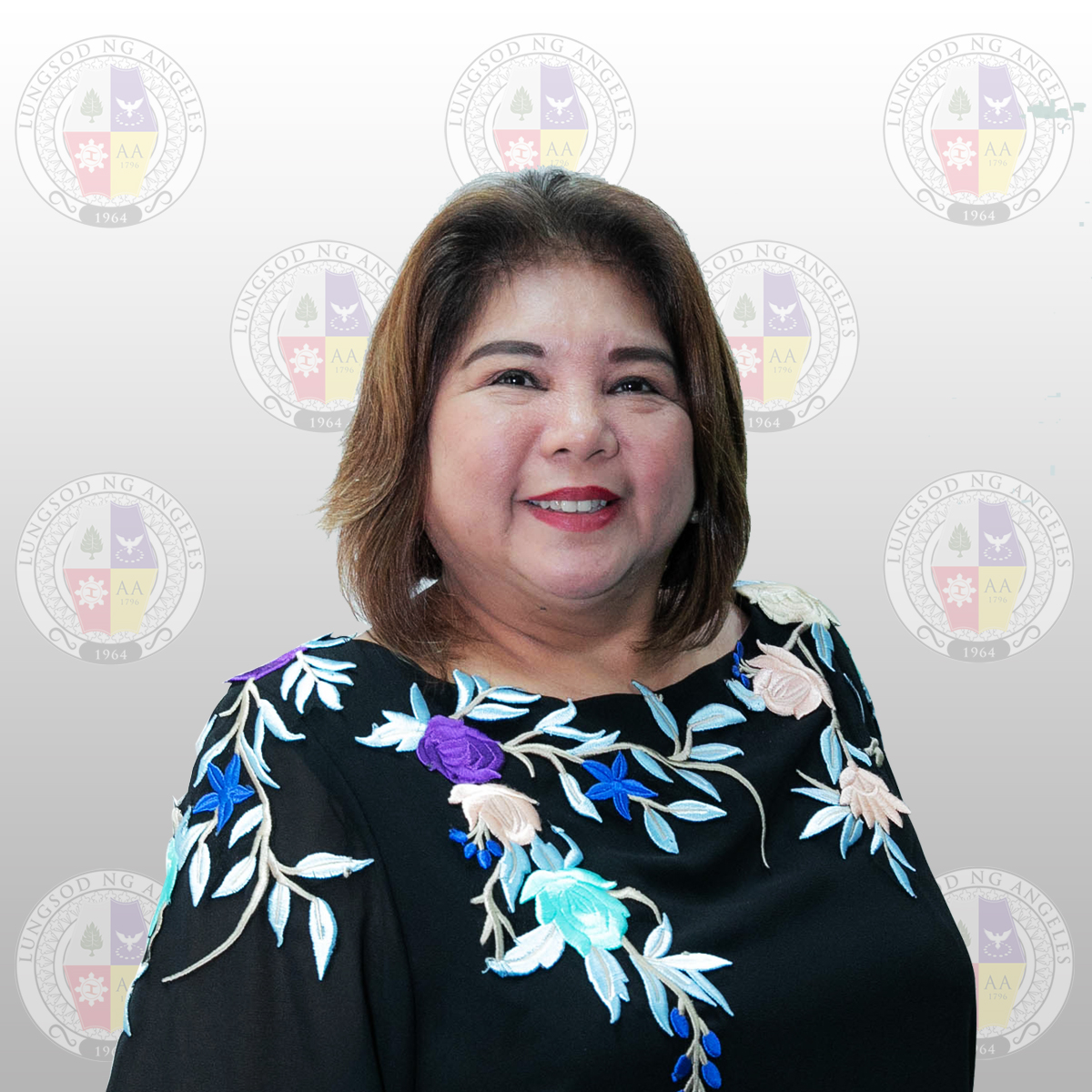
Candidate	Edgardo Pamintuan Sr.	Lito Lapid	Vicky Vega
Party	PAK/ABE	Lingap Lugud	Independent
Running mate	Bryan Matthew Nepomuceno	Willie Rivera	Arvin Suller
Popular vote	76,540	45,710	12,864
Percentage	56.6%	28.33%	9.5%
Mayor before election
Edgardo Pamintuan Sr.
PAK/ABE
Elected mayor
Edgardo Pamintuan Sr.
PAK/ABE
- Vice mayoral election
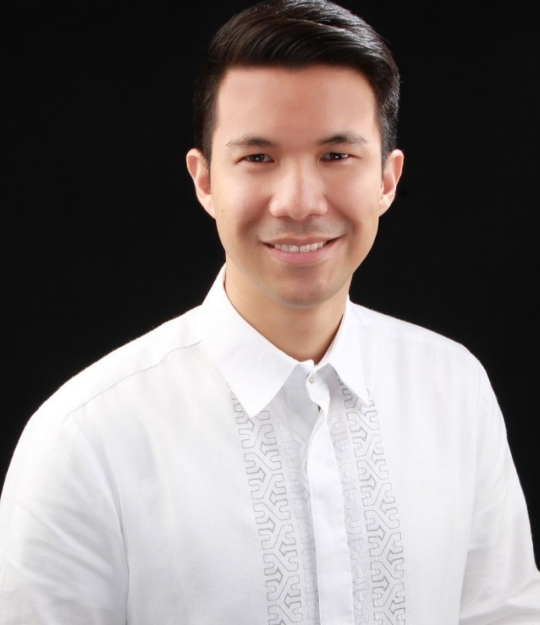

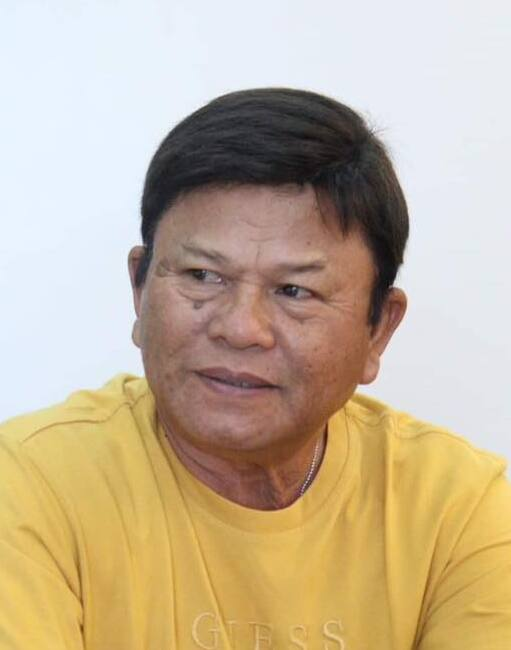

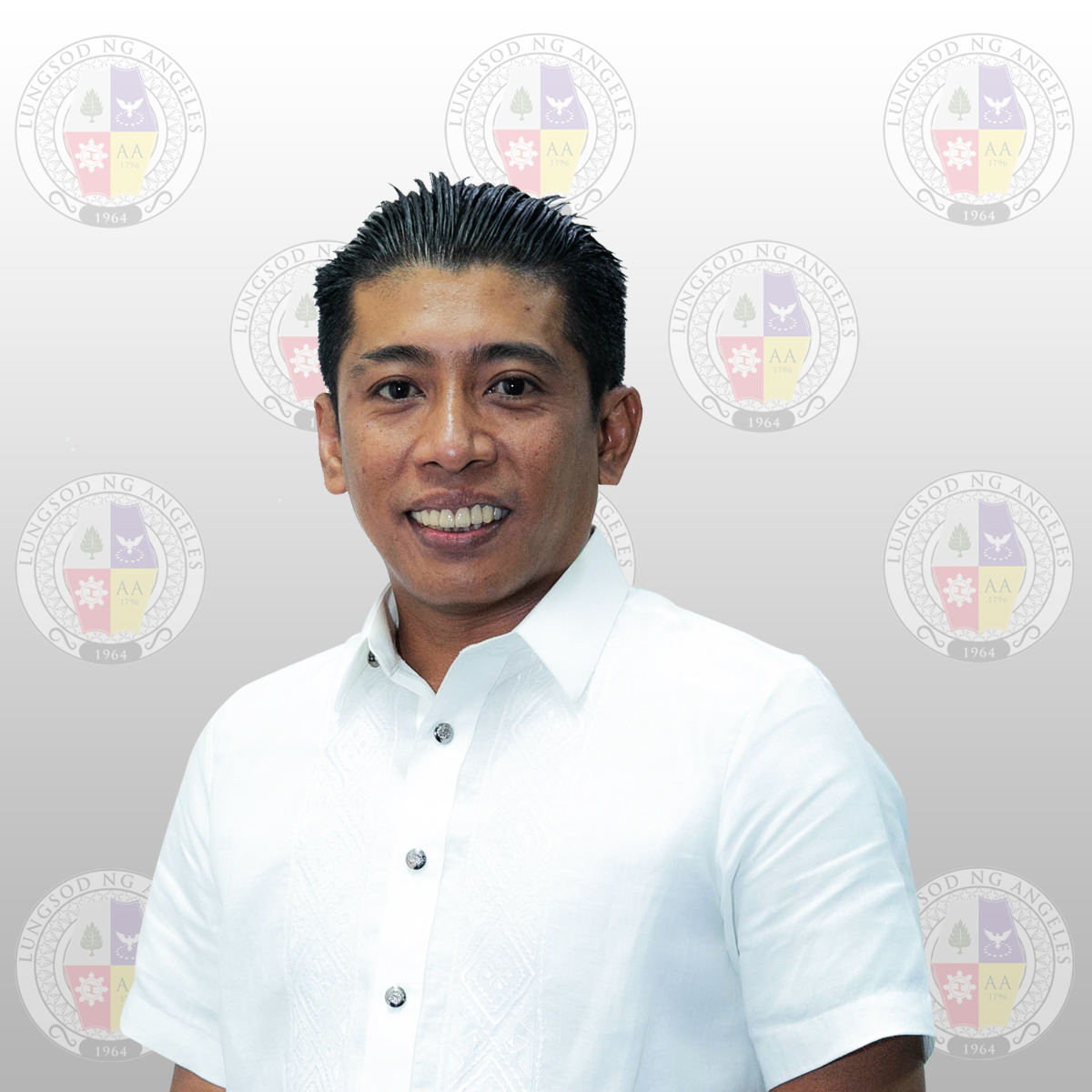
Nominee	Bryan Matthew Nepomuceno	Rodelio Mamac Sr.	Arvin Suller
Party	PAK/ABE	Liberal	Independent
Popular vote	56,119	31,161	30,364
Percentage	45.57%
Vice Mayor before election
Vicky Vega
PAK/ABE
Elected Vice Mayor
Bryan Matthew Nepomuceno
PAK/ABE

Local elections were held in Angeles City on May 9, 2016, as part of the 2016 Philippine general election. Angeles City voters will elect a mayor, a vice mayor, and 10 out of 12 councilors of the Angeles City Council.

There are 175,432 eligible voters in the city for this election. Most of them voted for the incumbent.

== Background ==
Edgardo Pamintuan Sr. was the incumbent, and was running for his final term. He was pitted against former senator and former Pampanga governor Lito Lapid and incumbent vice mayor Maria Vicenta Vega-Cabigting (who was on her final term, thus unable to seek re-election for that post).

== Results ==
The candidates for mayor and vice mayor with the highest number of votes win their respective seats. They are elected separately; therefore, they may be of different parties when elected.

=== Mayoral Election ===
Parties are as stated in their certificate of candidacies.

Angeles City Mayoral election
Party	Candidate	Votes	%
PAK/ABE	Edgardo Pamintuan Sr.	76,540	56.65%
Lingap Lugud	Lito Lapid	45,710	33.83%
Independent	Maria Vicenta Vega-Cabigting	12,864	9.52%
Total votes		135,114	100.00%
PAK/ABE hold			

=== Vice Mayoral Election ===
Parties are as stated in their certificate of candidacies.

Angeles City Vice Mayoral election
Party	Candidate	Votes	%
PAK/ABE	Bryan Matthew Nepomuceno	56,119	45.57%
Liberal	Rodelio Mamac Sr.	31,161	
Independent	Atty. Arvin "Pogs" Suller	30,364	
Lingap Lugud	Atty. Willie Rivera	13,080	
Independent	Severino Madlangbayan Jr.	627	
Total votes		131,621	
PAK/ABE hold			

=== City Council Election ===
Voters elected ten councilors to comprise the City Council or the Sangguniang Panlungsod. Candidates are voted for separately so winning candidates may come from different political parties. The ten candidates with the highest number of votes win the seats.

Angeles City Council Election
Party	Candidate	Votes	%
PAK/ABE	Jericho Aguas	84,706	
PAK/ABE	Edu Pamintuan	81,992	
Lingap Lugud	Carmelo Lazatin Jr.	80,310	
PAK/ABE	Alexander Indiongco	75,921	
PAK/ABE	Joseph Alfie Bonifacio	72,117	
PAK/ABE	Danilo Lacson	64,253	
PDP–Laban	PG Ponce	61,930	
Independent	Jay Sangil	59,366	
PAK/ABE	Amos Rivera	52,449	
PAK/ABE	Jae Vincent Flores	50,828	
PAK/ABE	Max Sangil	49,003	
Lingap Lugud	Carlo Maniago	35,522	
Lingap Lugud	Rudy Simeon	32,014	
PAK/ABE	JC Costales	27,488	
Lingap Lugud	Bryan Buan	26,522	
Lingap Lugud	Ricardo Tayag III	24,912	
PAK/ABE	Antonio Trinidad	23,938	
Lingap Lugud	Tin-Tin Dungca	19,219	
Lingap Lugud	Fides April Miranda	13,747	
Lingap Lugud	Christopher Sangil	11,770	
Lingap Lugud	Mai Cruz	6,854	
Independent	Renato Peña	4,261	
Independent	Frank Olingay	3,903	
Total votes			
