= Bryan Matthew Nepomuceno =

Filipino lawyer and politician (born 1980)

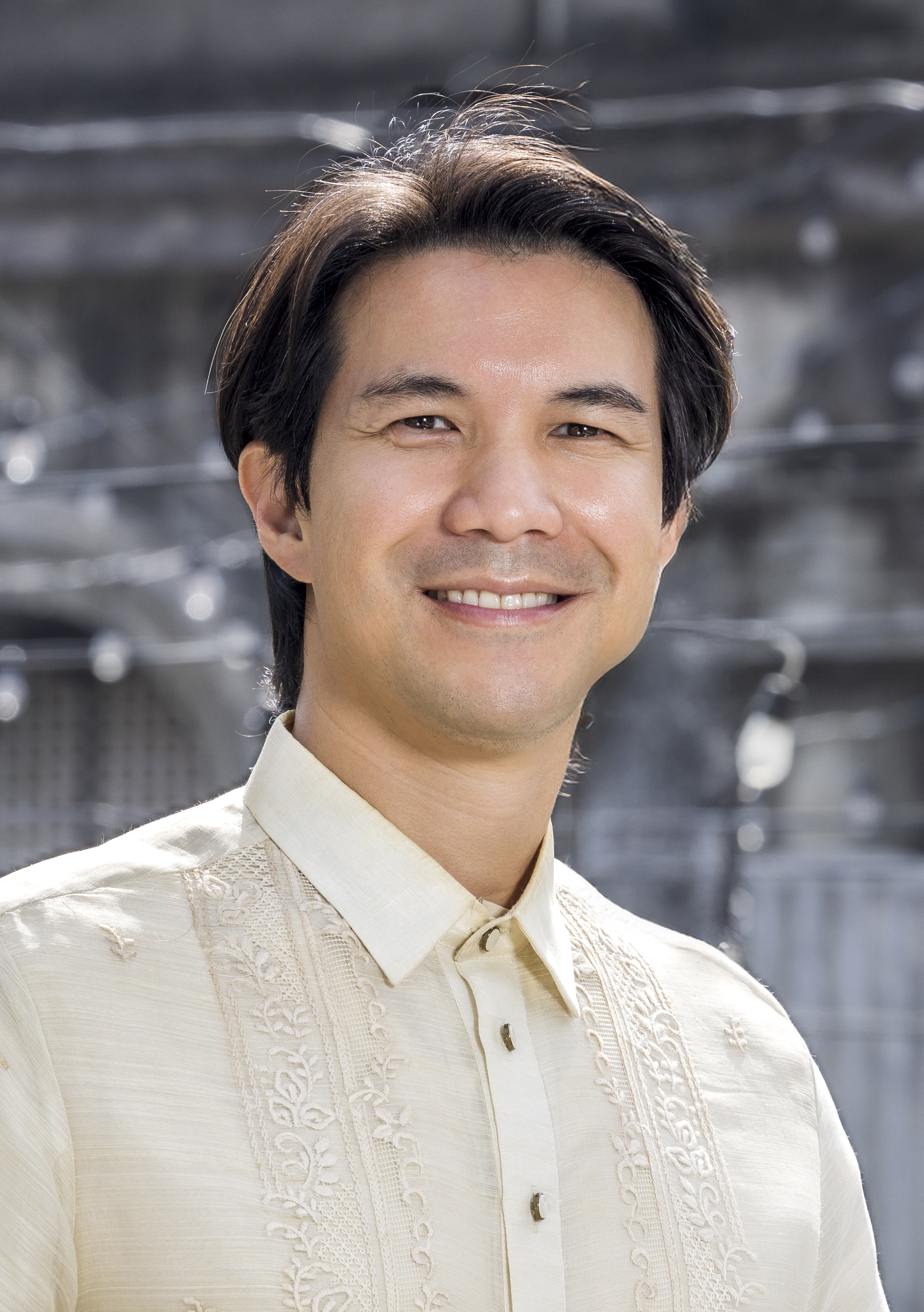
- Official portrait, 2026

Member of the Board of Directors of Clark Development Corporation
- Incumbent
- Assumed office October 21, 2022

Vice Mayor of Angeles City
- In office June 30, 2016 – June 30, 2019
- Mayor: Edgardo Pamintuan Sr.
- Preceded by: Vicky Vega-Cabigting
- Succeeded by: Vicky Vega-Cabigting

Member of Angeles City Council
- In office June 30, 2010 – June 30, 2016

Personal details
- Born: Bryan Matthew Cuyugan Nepomuceno; January 10, 1980 (age 46) Angeles City, Philippines
- Party: Independent (2019–present)
- Other political affiliations: PAK/ABE (2015–2019); NPC (2009–2015)
- Spouse: Erika Jimenez
- Children: 4
- Relatives: Francis Nepomuceno (uncle); Francisco Nepomuceno (grandfather); Juanita Nepomuceno (grandmother)
- Education: Ateneo de Manila University (AB) (LL.B.)
- Occupation: Politician; lawyer; businessman

Bryan Matthew Cuyugan Nepomuceno (born January 10, 1980) is a Filipino lawyer and politician who currently serving as member of the board directors of Clark Development Corporation since 2022. He previously served as the Vice Mayor of Angeles City from 2016 to 2019. He served as a member of the Angeles City Council from 2010 to 2016.

== Early years ==
Nepomuceno was born on January 10, 1980 in Angeles City to future then-board member Robin "Bombing" Nepomuceno and Cecilia Cuyugan. He studied O.B. Montessori of Angeles for his primary education. He studied Ateneo de Manila High School for his secondary education. He took up political science and law at the Ateneo de Manila University. In 2007, Nepomuceno passed the bar examination.

Nepomuceno worked as director and legal consultant for the Liga ng mga Barangay in Angeles City from 2009 to 2010.

== Political career ==
=== Councilor of Angeles City (2010–2016) ===
Nepomuceno started his career in politics when he won as a City Councilor of Angeles City from 2010 to 2016.

=== Vice Mayor of Angeles City (2016–2019) ===
Nepomuceno later became a Vice Mayor of Angeles City from 2016 to 2019.

=== 2019 Angeles City mayoralty bid ===
In 2019 elections, Nepomuceno ran for Mayor of Angeles City but he lost to Carmelo Lazatin Jr. along with his running mate Edu Pamintuan.

=== CDC Board of Director (2022–present) ===
In October 2022, Nepomuceno was appointed as member of the Board of Directors in Clark Development Corporation by President Bongbong Marcos.

== Personal life ==
Nepomuceno is married to Erika Jimenez from Negros Occidental, also a lawyer and has four children.

His paternal grandparents, Francisco Nepomuceno and Juanita Nepomuceno both served as representative and governor from Pampanga.

== Electoral history ==
Electoral history of Bryan Matthew Nepomuceno
Year	Office	Party	Votes received				Result
Year	Office	Party	Total	%	P.	Swing	Result
2010	Councilor of Angeles City	NPC	43,976	—N/a	5th	—N/a	Won
2013	Councilor of Angeles City	NPC	63,856	58.81%	2nd	—N/a	Won
2016	Vice Mayor of Angeles City	PAK/ABE	56,119	45.57%	1st	—N/a	Won
2019	Mayor of Angeles City	PAK/ABE	45,711	34.18%	2nd	—N/a	Lost

Political offices
Preceded by Vicky Vega-Cabigting	Vice Mayor of Angeles City; 2016–2019	Succeeded by Vicky Vega-Cabigting
