= 2013 Angeles City local elections =

Philippine elections

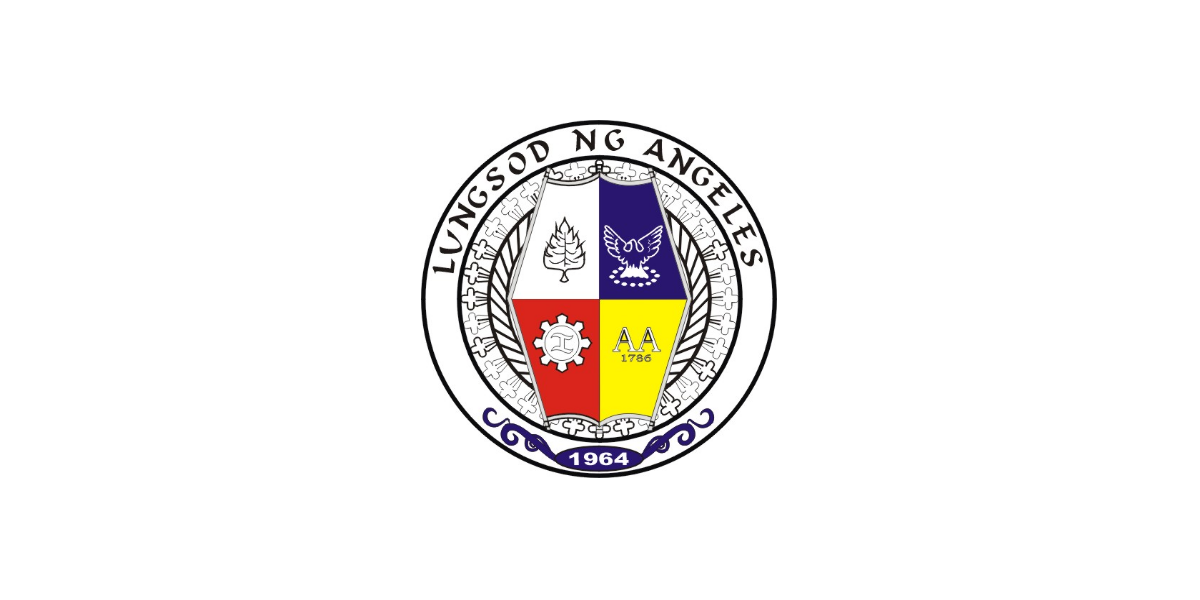
- May 13, 2013
- Mayoral election

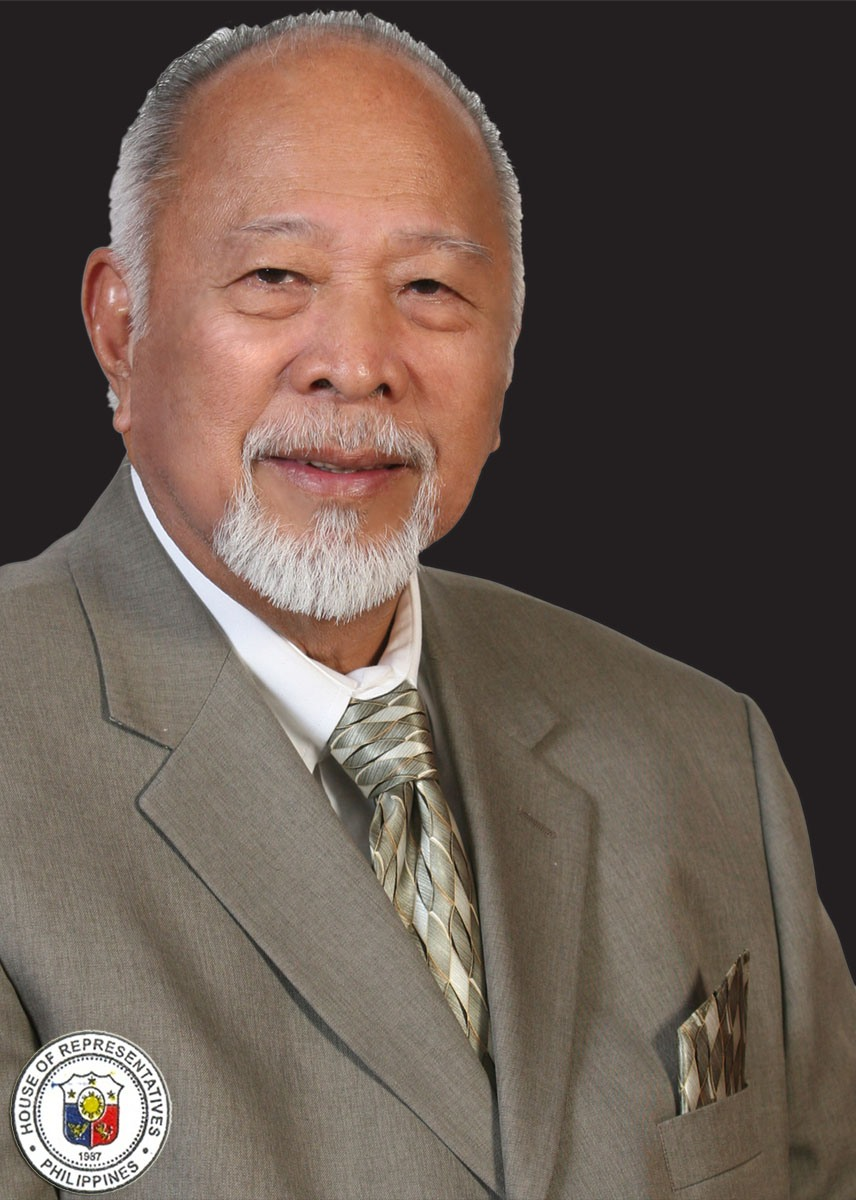
Candidate	Edgardo Pamintuan Sr.	Carmelo Lazatin Sr.
Party	PAK/ABE	Lakas
Running mate	Maria Vicenta Vega-Cabigting
Popular vote	59,504	45,535
Percentage	54.80%	41.94%
Mayor before election
Edgardo Pamintuan Sr.
PAK/ABE
Elected mayor
Edgardo Pamintuan Sr.
PAK/ABE
- Vice mayoral election
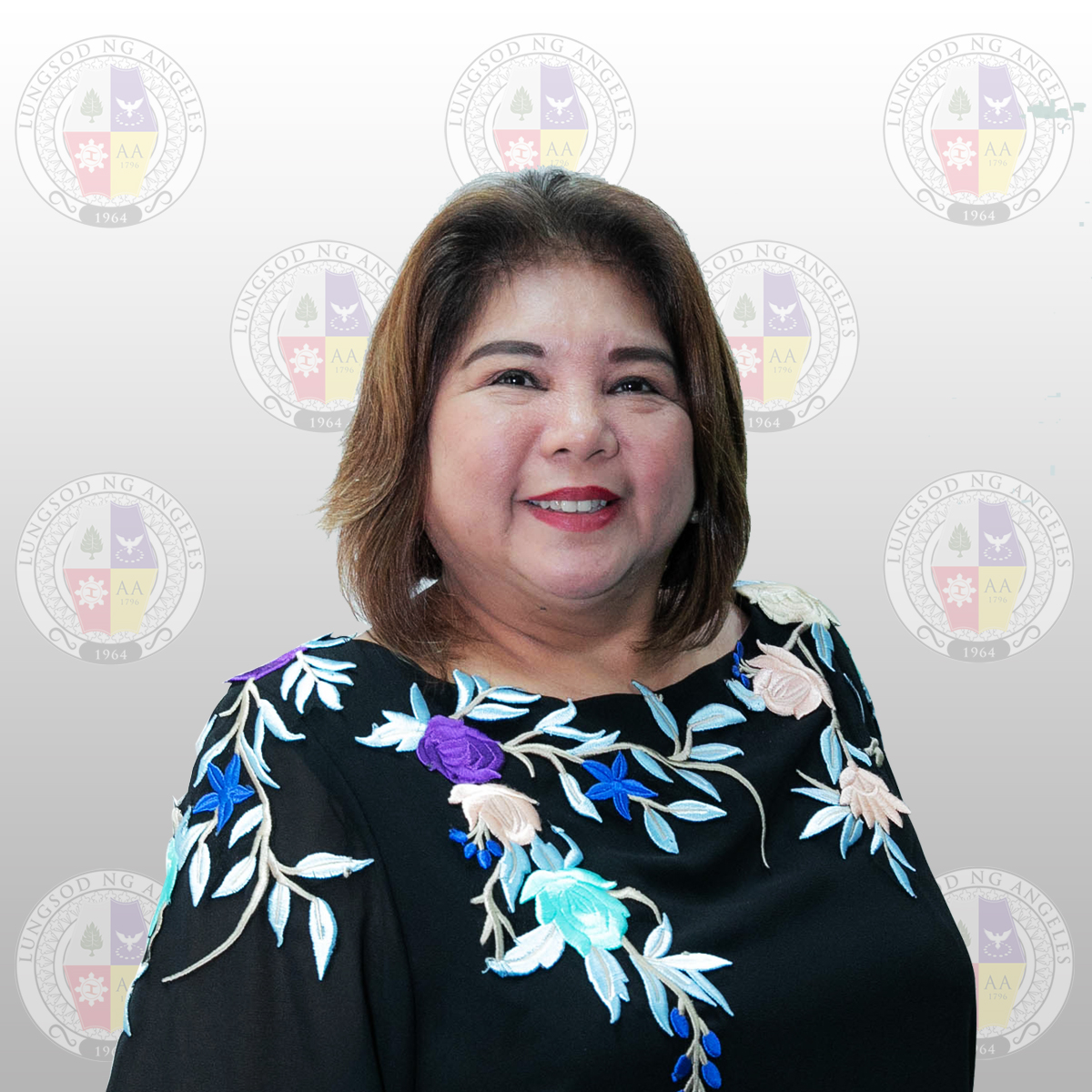

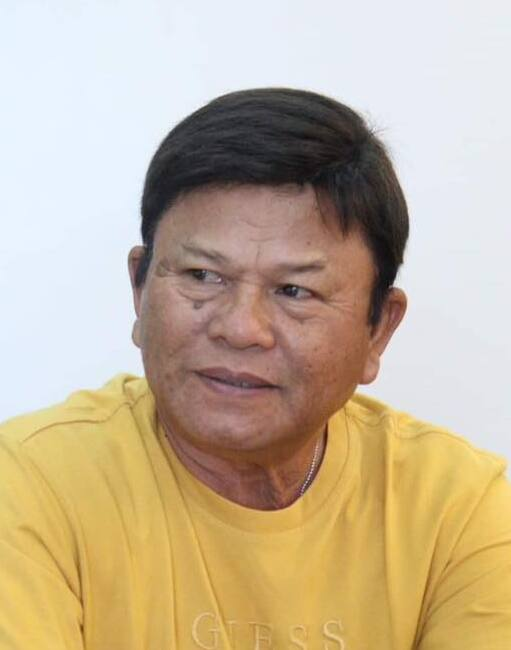
Nominee	Vicky Vega	Rodelio Mamac Sr.
Party	PAK/ABE	Liberal
Popular vote	33,828	28,008
Percentage	31.15%	25.79%
Vice Mayor before election
Vicky Vega
PAK/ABE
Elected Vice Mayor
Vicky Vega
PAK/ABE

Local elections were held in the city of Angeles on May 13, 2013, in conjunction with the 2013 Philippine midterm elections. Registered voters of the city will be electing candidates for the following elective local posts: city mayor, city vice mayor, and ten councilors.

As Angeles City is a highly urbanized city, its voters do note vote for Pampanga elective officials; however, they participate in electing the province's first district representative. That district also includes the city of Mabalacat and the municipality of Magalang, all component local government units of the province.

== Results ==
The candidates for mayor and vice mayor with the highest number of votes win their respective seats. They are elected separately; therefore, they may be of different parties when elected.

=== Mayor ===
Edgardo Pamintuan Sr. is the incumbent. His main opponent is 1st District Congressman Carmelo Lazatin.

Angeles City Mayoral Election
Party	Candidate	Votes	%
PAK/ABE	Edgardo Pamintuan Sr.	59,504	54.80%
Lakas	Carmelo Lazatin Sr.	45,535	41.94%
Invalid or blank votes		3,544	3.26%
Total votes		108,583	100.00%
PAK/ABE hold			

=== Vice Mayor ===
Maria Vicenta Vega-Cabigting is the incumbent. Her opponents are councilors Joseph Alfie Bonifacio and Jesus Sangil, Barangay Balibago Chairman Rodelio Mamac, Sr. and Mark Allen Sison.

Angeles City Vice Mayoral Election
Party	Candidate	Votes	%
PAK/ABE	Maria Vicenta Vega-Cabigting	33,828	31.15%
Liberal	Rodelio Mamac Sr.	28,008	25.79%
Nacionalista	Joseph Alfie Bonifacio	20,819	19.17%
Independent	Jesus Sangil	12,849	11.83%
UNA	Mark Allen Sison	4,318	3.98%
Invalid or blank votes		8,761	8.07%
Total votes		108,583	100.00%
PAK/ABE hold			

== City Councilors ==
Voting is via plurality-at-large voting: Voters will vote for ten (10) candidates and the ten candidates with the highest number of votes are elected.

=== Results ===
Angeles City Council Election
Party	Candidate	Votes	%
PAK/ABE	Jericho Aguas	66,756	61.48
NPC	Bryan Matthew Nepomuceno	63,856	58.81
PAK/ABE	Arvin Suller	63,366	58.36
PAK/ABE	Danica Lacson	58,374	53.76
PAK/ABE	Maricel Morales	57,932	53.35
PAK/ABE	Edgardo Pamintuan, Jr.	57,525	52.98
PAK/ABE	Alexander Indiongco	51,711	47.62
Lakas	Carmelo Lazatin, Jr.	50,476	46.49
Lakas	Max Sangil	42,535	39.17
PAK/ABE	Amos Rivera	40,004	36.84
Independent	Ares Yabut	36,220	33.36
PAK/ABE	Lito Ganzon	31,994	29.47
PAK/ABE	Ruben Maniago	30,839	28.40
Lakas	Nino Enriquez	28,898	26.61
Independent	Agapito Del Rosario	24,706	22.75
Liberal	Rudy Simeon	21,935	20.20
PAK/ABE	Romeo Taruc	21,031	19.37
Total votes		108,503	100.00
