= JC Parker Aguas =

Filipino former actress and politician

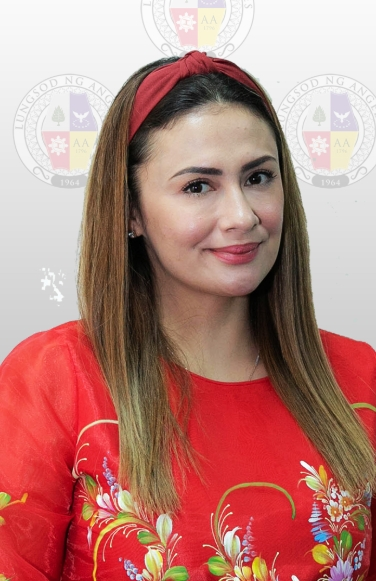
- Official portrait, 2023

Member of Angeles City Council
- Incumbent
- Assumed office June 30, 2019

Personal details
- Born: May 12, 1985 (age 41) Quezon City, Philippines
- Party: Lakas (2024–present)
- Other political affiliations: KAMBILAN (2021–2024); PAK/ABE (2018–2021)
- Spouse: Jericho Aguas
- Occupation: Politician, social advocate, former actress
- Known for: Viva Hot Babes
- Awards: Asia’s Modern Hero Award (2023)
- Nickname: JC Parker

Joan Crystal De Jesus Aguas (born May 12, 1985), professionally known as JC Parker (Note: Prior to her political career, she was known by the stage name Jaycee Parker. Upon entering politics in 2019, she adopted the name JC Parker.), is a Filipino politician, former actress, and social advocate, currently serving as a member of the Angeles City Council since 2019.

Prior to entering politics, she gained national fame as a member of the Viva Hot Babes, a popular dance and music group managed by Viva Entertainment. She is known for pioneering local legislation against Online Sexual Abuse and Exploitation of Children (OSAEC) and for her programs focusing on women, children, and marginalized communities.

== Early life and entertainment career ==
Aguas was born on May 12, 1985 in Quezon City and raised in Plaridel, Bulacan. She later pursued a career in entertainment, becoming nationally recognized as a performer with the Viva Hot Babes during the mid-2000s. In 2015, she relocated to Angeles City, following her marriage to Jericho “Geryk” Aguas, who was already active in local politics.

== Political career ==
=== Entry into politics ===
Aguas first ran for public office during the 2019 midterm elections, successfully winning a seat on the Angeles City Council by placing fourth among all candidates, receiving over 57,834 votes. In the 2022 local elections, she significantly increased her voter base, placing second overall with 80,606 votes, reflecting her growing influence and popularity in the city. She was again re-elected in the 2025 local elections, maintaining her standing as one of the top-performing councilors of Angeles City.

=== Legislative initiatives ===
She authored and sponsored a landmark local ordinance against Online Sexual Abuse and Exploitation of Children (OSAEC), one of the first comprehensive local laws of its kind in the Philippines. Her advocacy is supported by both local and international organizations, including the International Justice Mission (IJM), which has cited her work as a model for other cities in the country.

In 2023, she was awarded the Asia’s Modern Hero Award as a Heroes’ Exemplary Government Leader and Advocate for Children’s Welfare for her contributions to child protection legislation.

=== Leadership roles ===
In addition to her role as a city councilor, Aguas has held significant leadership positions in the Philippines Councilors League (PCL), the nationwide organization of local legislators. She was elected Vice President for Luzon Island for the 2023–2025 term, representing councilors from multiple provinces and cities across the island of Luzon.

== Personal life ==
JC Parker is married to Jericho “Geryk” Aguas, who has also served as a City Councilor of Angeles City.

== Electoral history ==
Electoral history of JC Parker Aguas
| Year | Office | Party | Votes received | | | | Result |
| Year | Office | Party | Total | % | P. | Swing | Result |
|---|---|---|---|---|---|---|---|
| 2019 | Councilor of Angeles City | PAK/ABE | 57,834 | 4.94% | 4th | —N/a | Won |
| 2022 | Councilor of Angeles City | KAMBILAN | 80,606 | 51.18% | 2nd | —N/a | Won |
| 2025 | Councilor of Angeles City | Lakas | 79,661 | 46.64% | 2nd | —N/a | Won |
