= Edu Pamintuan =

Filipino politician and businessman

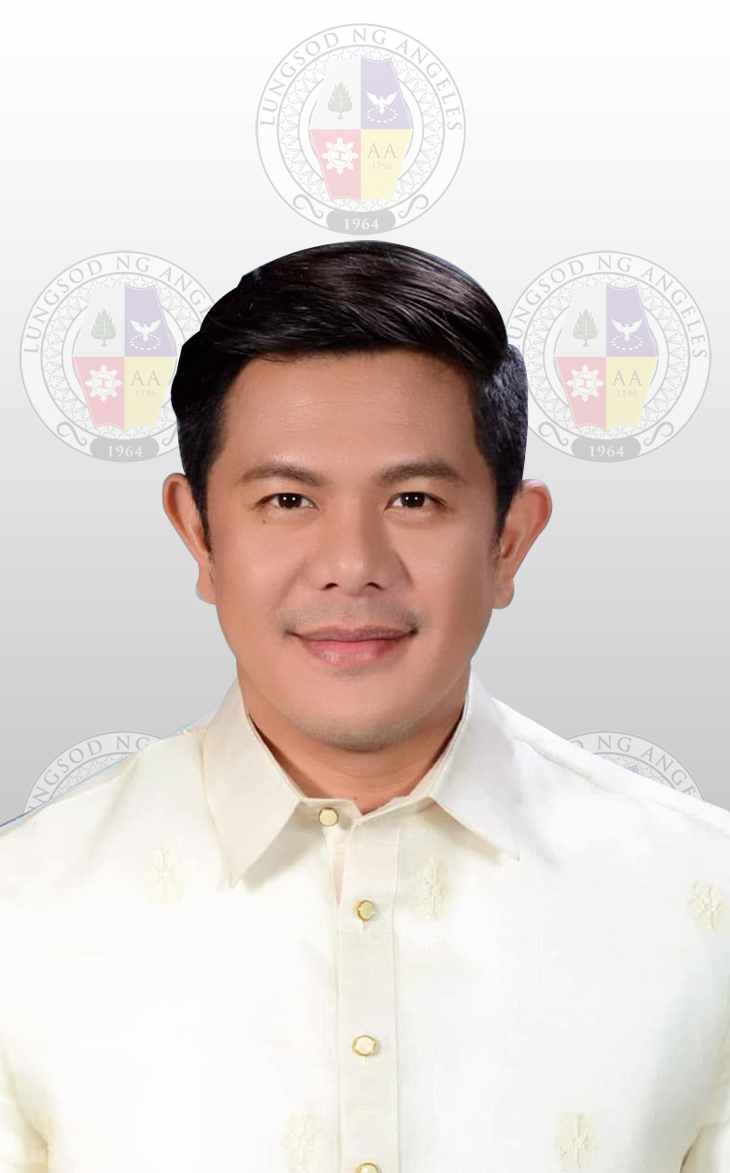
- Official portrait, 2023

Member of Angeles City Council
- Incumbent
- Assumed office June 30, 2022
- In office June 30, 2010 – June 30, 2019

Personal details
- Born: July 21, 1980 (age 46)
- Party: Lakas (2009–2012; 2024–present); PAK/ABE (local party; 2012–present)
- Spouse: Nicole Ablan
- Education: San Beda College (AB)
- Occupation: Politician, businessman

Edgardo "Edu" de Guzman Pamintuan Jr. (born July 21, 1980) is a Filipino politician and businessman. He is currently serving as a member of the Angeles City Council since 2022; a position he previously held from 2010 to 2019.

== Early life and education ==
Pamintuan was born on July 21, 1980 to Edgardo Pamintuan and Herminia de Guzman. He studied Holy Family Academy for his high school education. He also studied San Beda College, where he finished the degree of economics with computer applications.

== Political career ==
=== Angeles City Council (2010–2019) ===
In 2010 elections, Pamintuan became a councilor in Angeles City where he served for three consecutive terms.

=== 2019 Angeles City vice mayoralty bid ===
In 2019 elections, Pamintuan ran for vice mayor of Angeles City with his running mate Bryan Matthew Nepomuceno who ran for mayor but they both lost.

=== Return to Angeles City Council (2022–present) ===
In 2022 elections, Pamintuan returned as councilor in Angeles City.

== Personal life ==
Pamintuan is married to Nicole Ablan.

== Electoral history ==
Electoral history of Edu Pamintuan
Year	Office	Party		Votes received				Result
Year	Office	Local	National	Total	%	P.	Swing	Result
2010	Councilor of Angeles City	—N/a	Lakas–Kampi	40,117	—N/a	10th	—N/a	Won
2013	Councilor of Angeles City	PAK/ABE	—N/a	57,525	52.98%	6th	—N/a	Won
2016	Councilor of Angeles City	PAK/ABE	—N/a	81,992	—N/a	2nd	—N/a	Won
2022	Councilor of Angeles City	PAK/ABE	—N/a	56,052	35.59%	8th	—N/a	Won
2025	Councilor of Angeles City	PAK/ABE	Lakas	68,952	40.76%	5th	—N/a	Won
2019	Vice Mayor of Angeles City	PAK/ABE	—N/a	48,116	36.76%	2nd	—N/a	Lost
