= Vicky Vega =

Filipino politician and actress (born 1966)

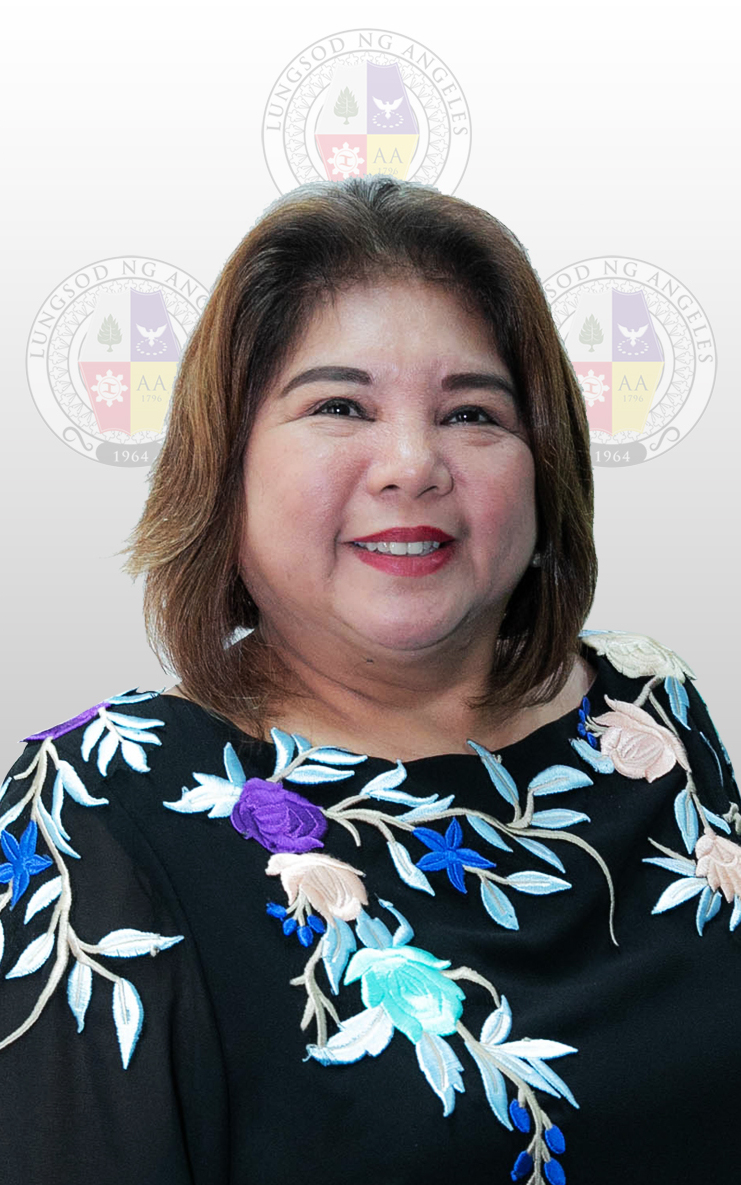
- Official portrait, 2023

Vice Mayor of Angeles City
- In office June 30, 2019 – June 30, 2025
- Mayor: Carmelo Lazatin Jr.
- Preceded by: Bryan Matthew Nepomuceno
- Succeeded by: Amos Rivera
- In office June 30, 2007 – June 30, 2016
- Mayor: Francis Nepomuceno (2007–2010); Edgardo Pamintuan Sr. (2010–2016)
- Preceded by: Ricardo Zalamea
- Succeeded by: Bryan Matthew Nepomuceno

Member of Angeles City Council
- In office June 30, 2001 – June 30, 2007

Personal details
- Born: Maria Vicenta Licup Vega; May 30, 1966 (age 60) Angeles City, Philippines
- Party: Lakas (2001–2012; 2024–present)
- Other political affiliations: KAMBILAN (2021–2024); PFP (2018–2021); Independent (2015–2018); PAK/ABE (2012–2015); KAMPI (2007)
- Spouse: Arthur Cabigting
- Children: 2
- Education: University of the Philippines Diliman (BA); Holy Angel University (MPM)
- Occupation: Politician, actress

Maria Vicenta Licup Vega-Cabigting (born May 30, 1966), also known as Vicky Vega or Vicky Vega-Cabigting, is a Filipino politician and actress who served as Vice Mayor of Angeles City from 2019 to 2025; a position she previously held from 2007 to 2016. She also served as Councilor of Angeles City from 2001 to 2007.

== Early life and education ==
Vega was born on May 30, 1966 in Angeles City to Marcelino Vega Jr. and Brigida Licup. She studied University of the Philippines Diliman where she finished the degree of Mass Communication. She took up masters degree in Public Management at the Holy Angel University.

== Political career ==
=== Councilor of Angeles City (2001–2007) ===
Vega started politics in 2001 when she entered as councilor in Angeles City until 2007.

=== Vice Mayor of Angeles City (2007–2016) ===
In 2007 elections, Vega was elected and became a first female vice mayor of Angeles City where she served for three consecutive terms.

=== 2016 Angeles City mayoralty bid ===
In 2016, Vega ran for mayor of Angeles City but she lost to Edgardo Pamintuan Sr. and placed third.

=== Return to Vice Mayor of Angeles City (2019–2025) ===
In 2019 elections, Vega came back as vice mayor of Angeles City.

In 2025, Vega lost to Amos Rivera for re-election as vice mayor of Angeles City.

== Personal life ==
Vega is married to Arthur Cabigting and has two sons.

== Filmography ==
- The Spider's Lair (2013) as Marney's Mother
- The Coffin Maker (2014) as Doc Wen
- Area (2016) as Market Customer
- Persons of Interest (2018) as Defense Lawyer

== Electoral history ==
Electoral history of Vicky Vega
| Year | Office | Party | Votes received | | | | Result |
| Year | Office | Party | Total | % | P. | Swing | Result |
|---|---|---|---|---|---|---|---|
| 2001 | Councilor of Angeles City | Lakas | —N/a | —N/a | 1st | —N/a | Won |
| 2004 | Councilor of Angeles City | Lakas | —N/a | —N/a | 1st | —N/a | Won |
| 2007 | Vice Mayor of Angeles City | KAMPI | 35,832 | —N/a | 1st | —N/a | Won |
| 2010 | Vice Mayor of Angeles City | Lakas–Kampi | 61,289 | —N/a | 1st | —N/a | Won |
| 2013 | Vice Mayor of Angeles City | PAK/ABE | 33,828 | 31.15% | 1st | —N/a | Won |
| 2019 | Vice Mayor of Angeles City | PFP | 55,874 | 42.69% | 1st | —N/a | Won |
| 2022 | Vice Mayor of Angeles City | KAMBILAN | 93,697 | 67.38% | 1st | —N/a | Won |
| 2025 | Vice Mayor of Angeles City | Lakas | 72,315 | 47.52% | 2nd | —N/a | Lost |
| 2016 | Mayor of Angeles City | Independent | 12,864 | —N/a | 3rd | —N/a | Lost |
