= Mayor of Angeles City =

Local chief executive of Angeles City, Philippines

- Punong Lungsod ning Angeles
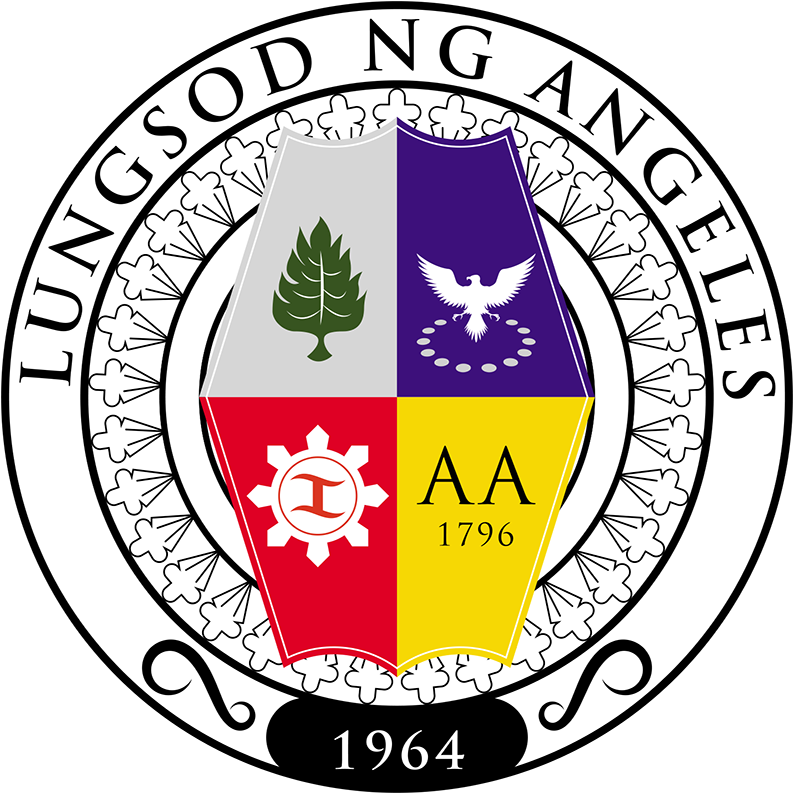
- Seal of Angeles City

- Incumbent; Carmelo B. Lazatin II since June 30, 2025
- Style: The Honorable
- Seat: Angeles City Hall
- Appointer: Elected via popular vote
- Term length: 3 years, not eligible for re-election immediately after three consecutive terms
- Inaugural holder: Ciriaco de Miranda (as Gobernadorcillo); Catalino de los Santos (as Capitán Municipal); Laureano Suarez (as Municipal President); Clemente N. Dayrit (as Municipal Mayor); Rafael S. del Rosario (as City Mayor)
- Formation: 1829 (as Gobernadorcillo); 1894 (as Capitán Municipal); 1901 (as Municipal President); 1937 (as Municipal Mayor); 1964 (as City Mayor)
- Deputy: Vice Mayor of Angeles City
- Salary: ₱196,206 per month ₱2,354,472 per year
- Website: https://www.angelescity.gov.ph/

The Mayor of Angeles City (Kapampangan: Punong Lungsod ning Angeles; Tagalog: Punong Lungsod ng Angeles) is the head of the local government of the city of Angeles in Pampanga, Philippines who is elected to three year terms. The Mayor is also the executive head and leads the city's departments in executing the city ordinances and improving public services. The city mayor is restricted to three consecutive terms, totaling nine years, although a mayor can be elected again after an interruption of one term.

== List of mayor ==
=== Gobernadorcillo or Capitan ===
- 1829–1830, Ciriaco de Miranda
- 1831, Alejandro Pamintuan
- 1832, Nicolas de Guzman
- 1833, Felipe Mendiola
- 1834, Nicolas Navarro
- 1835, Pantaleon Paras
- 1836, Victoriano Morales
- 1837, Mariano Tolentino
- 1838, Tiburcio Paras
- 1839, Vicente Feliciano
- 1840, Pedro Arceo
- 1841, Alejandro Pamintuan
- 1842, Eulogio Tadeo
- 1843, Cristobal Lacson
- 1844, Nicolas de Guzman
- 1845, Doroteo Dizon
- 1846, Esteban Datu
- 1847, Jose Maria Henson
- 1848, Nicolas Navarro
- 1849, Mauricio de Jesus
- 1850, Eulogio Tadeo
- 1851, Casimiro Sanchez
- 1852, Pio R. Nepomuceno
- 1853–1854, Pablo del Rosario
- 1855, Victor Lacson
- 1856, Jose Narciso
- 1857, Valentin Tuazon
- 1858, Pedro Tanjueco
- 1859, Carlos Cayanan
- 1860, Cesareo Dizon
- 1861, Perfecto Paras
- 1862, Tomas Dizon
- 1863, Pedro Sanchez
- 1864, Victor Lacson
- 1865, Agustin Dizon
- 1866, Jose Narciso
- 1867, Macario Dizon
- 1868, Mariano Suarez
- 1869, Filomeno Pamintuan
- 1869–1871, Laureano Lacson
- 1871, Mariano V. Henson
- 1873, Francisco Paras
- 1875, Mariano Pamintuan
- 1877, Eduardo Tison
- 1879, Juan Nepomuceno
- 1881, Simplicio Mendiola
- 1882, Juan de Guzman
- 1888, Vicente Paras
- 1885, Maximo Tablante
- 1887, Jose R. Henson
- 1889, Aniceto Gueco
- 1891, Laureano Suarez
- 1893, Catalino de los Santos

=== Capitán Municipal ===
- 1894, Catalino de los Santos
- 1895, Mariano Paras
- 1896, Clemente Gueco

=== Committee ===
- June 1, 1898, Filomeno Pamintuan, Teofisto Ganson, Galicano Valdes

=== Presidente Municipal ===
- September 1898, Juan Nepomuceno
- 1899, Laureano Lacson
- 1900, Galicano Valdes
- 1900, Pablo Torres

=== Alcalde ===
- 1900, Florentino Pamintuan
- 1901, Laureano Suarez

=== Municipal President (1901–1936) ===
Portrait	Mayor	Term
	Laureano Suarez	1901–1902
	Esteban Gomez	1902–1904
	Marcelo Mesina	1904
	Lauro Dizon	1904–1906
	Leandro Panlilio	1906–1908
	Jose P. Henson	1908–1910
	Galicano Valdes	1910–1913
	Demetrio Gomez	1913–1916
	Emiliano Valdes	1916–1919
	Clemente N. Dayrit	1919–1922
	Juan D. Nepomuceno	1922–1928
	Ricardo Nepomuceno	1928–1931
	Francisco Lazatin	1931–1936

=== Municipal Mayor (1937–1963) ===
Portrait	Mayor	Term
	Clemente N. Dayrit	1937–1941
	Agapito Jose A. S. del Rosario	1941–1942
	Clemente N. Dayrit	1942–1944
	Miguel Malig	1944
	Ponciano Dayrit	1944–1945
	Alberto Sicangco	1945
	Ricardo Canlas	1945–1946
	Rafael L. Lazatin	1946–1947
	Vicente N. Henson	1947
	Jose Pangilinan	1947–1951
	Mariano A. Henson	October 8 – November 5, 1951
	Manuel Abad Santos	1952–1959
	Rafael S. del Rosario	1960–1963

=== City Mayor (1964–present) ===
Portrait	Mayor	Term
	Rafael S. del Rosario	1964–1967
	Eugenio N. Suarez	1968–1971
	Rafael L. Lazatin	1972–1979
	Francisco G. Nepomuceno	1980–1987
	Antonio A. Abad Santos	1988–1992
	Edgardo D. Pamintuan	1992–1998
	Maximo L. Sangil	March 7 - June 30, 1998
	Carmelo F. Lazatin Sr.	1998–2007
	Francis L. Nepomuceno	2007-2010
	Edgardo D. Pamintuan	2010–2019
	Carmelo G. Lazatin Jr.	2019–2025
	Carmelo B. Lazatin II	2025–present

== Vice Mayor of Angeles City ==
Vice Mayor of Angeles City
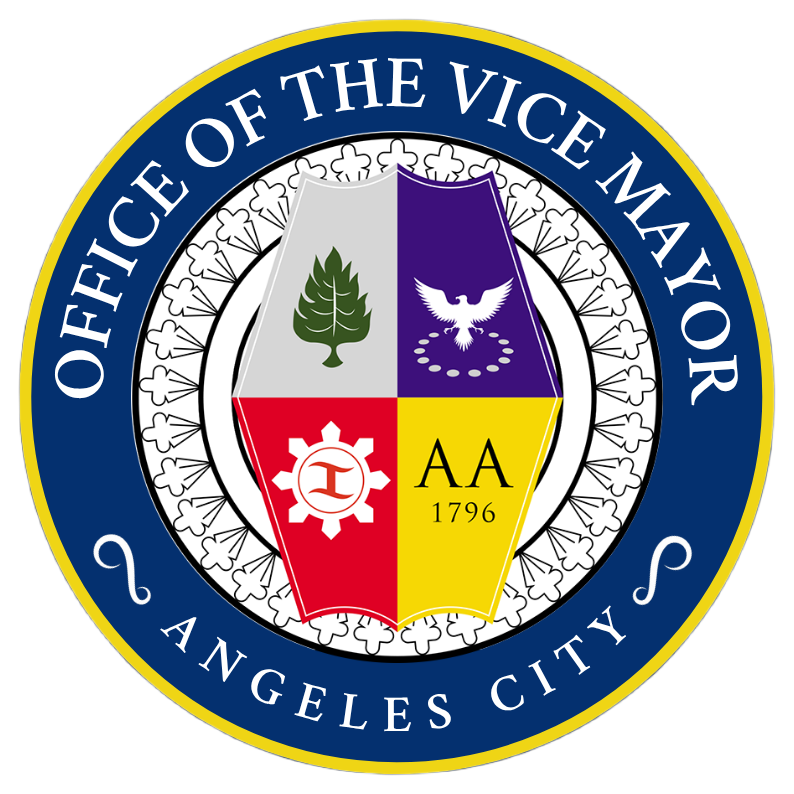
- Seal of the Office of the Vice Mayor

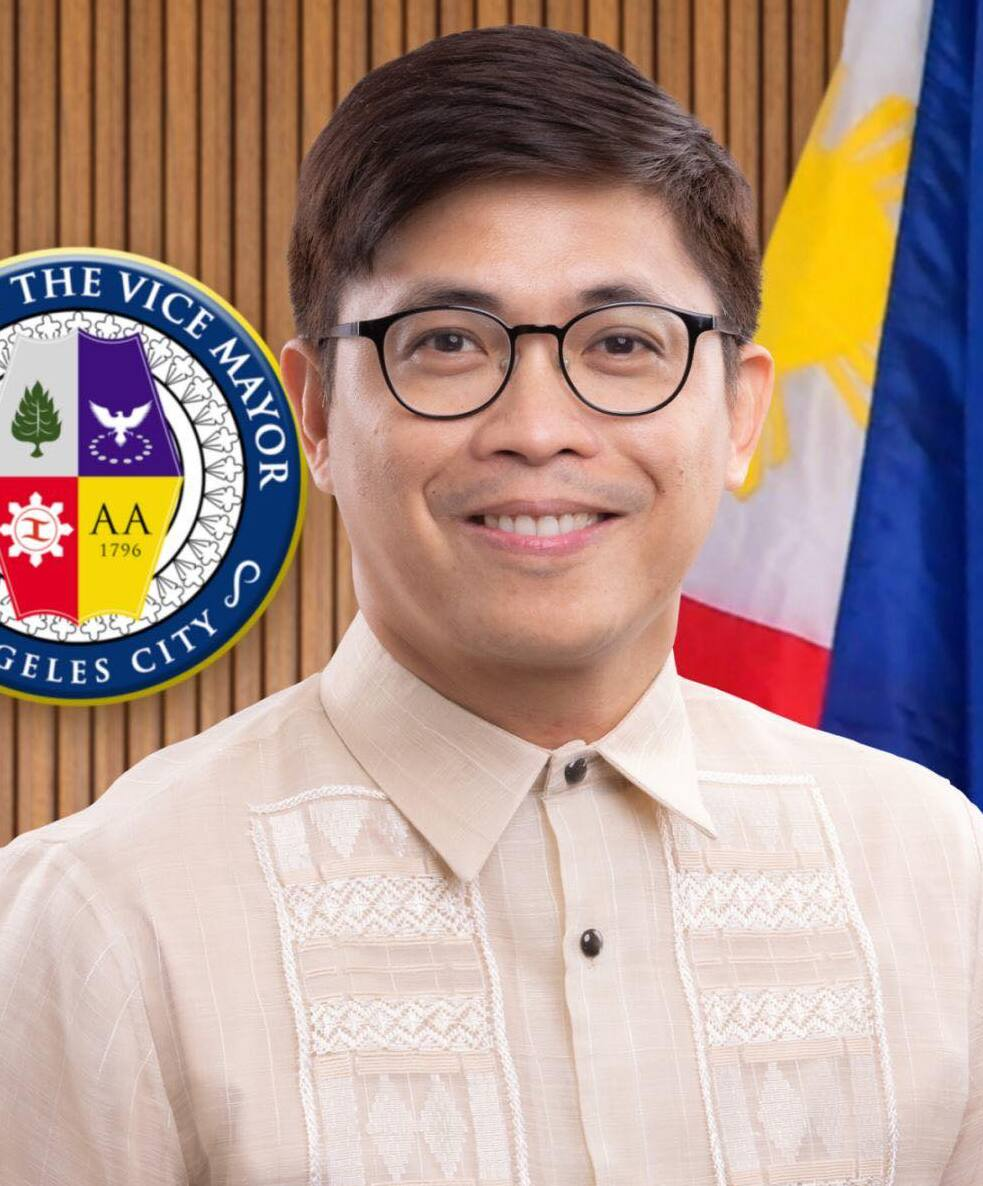
- Incumbent; Amos B. Rivera since June 30, 2025
- Style: The Honorable
- Appointer: Elected via popular vote
- Term length: 3 years, not eligible for re-election immediately after three consecutive terms

The vice mayor is the second-highest official in the city. The vice mayor is elected via popular vote; although most mayoral candidates have running mates, the vice mayor is elected separately from the mayor. This can result in the mayor and the vice mayor coming from different political parties.

The vice mayor is the presiding officer of the Angeles City Council. The vice mayor can only vote as the tiebreaker. When a mayor is removed from office, the vice mayor becomes the mayor until the scheduled next election.

=== List of Vice Mayor ===
No.	Portrait	Vice Mayor	Term
		Antonio A. Abad Santos	1986–1988
		Edgardo Pamintuan Sr.	1988–1992
		Ricardo Zalamea	1992–1995
		Francis L. Nepomuceno	1995–1998
		Ricardo Zalamea	1998–2007
		Vicky Vega-Cabigting	2007–2016
		Bryan Matthew Nepomuceno	2016–2019
		Vicky Vega-Cabigting	2019–2025
		Amos Rivera	2025–present

== Elections ==
- 2001 Angeles City local elections
- 2004 Angeles City local elections
- 2007 Angeles City local elections
- 2010 Angeles City local elections
- 2013 Angeles City local elections
- 2016 Angeles City local elections
- 2019 Angeles City local elections
- 2022 Angeles City local elections
- 2025 Angeles City local elections
