= Carmelo Lazatin Jr. =

Filipino politician and businessman (born 1969)

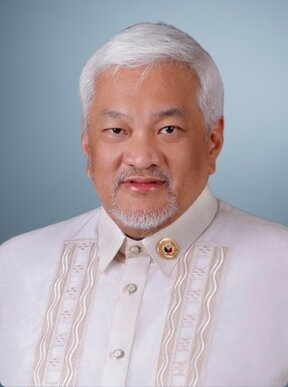
- Official portrait, 2025

Member of the House of Representatives from Pampanga's 1st district
- Incumbent
- Assumed office June 30, 2025
- Preceded by: Carmelo Lazatin II

34th Mayor of Angeles City
- In office June 30, 2019 – June 30, 2025
- Vice Mayor: Maria Vicenta L. Vega-Cabigting
- Preceded by: Edgardo D. Pamintuan
- Succeeded by: Carmelo Lazatin II

Member of Angeles City Council
- In office June 30, 2013 – June 30, 2019

Personal details
- Born: Carmelo Gurion Lazatin, Jr. August 28, 1969 (age 57) Angeles City, Philippines
- Party: PFP (2018–present); KAMBILAN (local party; 2021–present)
- Other political affiliations: Lingap Lugud (2015–2018); Lakas (2012–2015)
- Spouse: Ma. Tiffanee Lazatin
- Relations: Carmelo "Jon" Lazatin II (half-brother); Janet Lazatin (half-sister)
- Children: 3
- Relatives: Lazatin family
- Education: Angeles University Foundation (BBM) Republic Central Colleges (BS), (MBA) and (MPA)
- Occupation: Politician, businessman
- Website: carmelopogilazatinjr.com
- Nickname: Pogi

Carmelo Gurion Lazatin Jr. (Tagalog: [kɐrˈmɛlo lɐˈsatɪn dʒuˈnjɔr]; born August 28, 1969), also known as Pogi Lazatin, is a Filipino politician and businessman currently serving as the representative of Pampanga's first district since 2025, having previously served as the 34th mayor of Angeles City from 2019 to 2025.

Having won the 2025 Philippine House of Representatives elections unopposed. He succeeded his half-brother, Carmelo Lazatin II, currently serving as the 35th mayor of Angeles City.

== Early life and education ==
Pogi was born on August 28, 1969, in Angeles City to then-businessman Carmelo “Tarzan” Lazatin Sr. and Iluminada Gurion Lazatin. He is an alumnus of Angeles University Foundation, where he earned his Bachelor of Business Management degree. He then proceeded to Republic Central Colleges to pursue a Bachelor of Science, Major in Business Administration. Then he continued his education at the same institution, earning both a Master in Business Administration and a Master in Public Administration.

== Political career ==
=== Councilor of Angeles City (2013–2019) ===
Lazatin first entered politics, where he run and won as city councilor of Angeles City from 2013 to 2019. As a councilor, he has initiated numerous projects. Since his election on 2013 until his term ended on 2019. Lazatin belongs to the minority bloc, challenging the legislative agenda of then-Mayor Edgardo Pamintuan Sr..

=== Mayor of Angeles City (2019–2025) ===
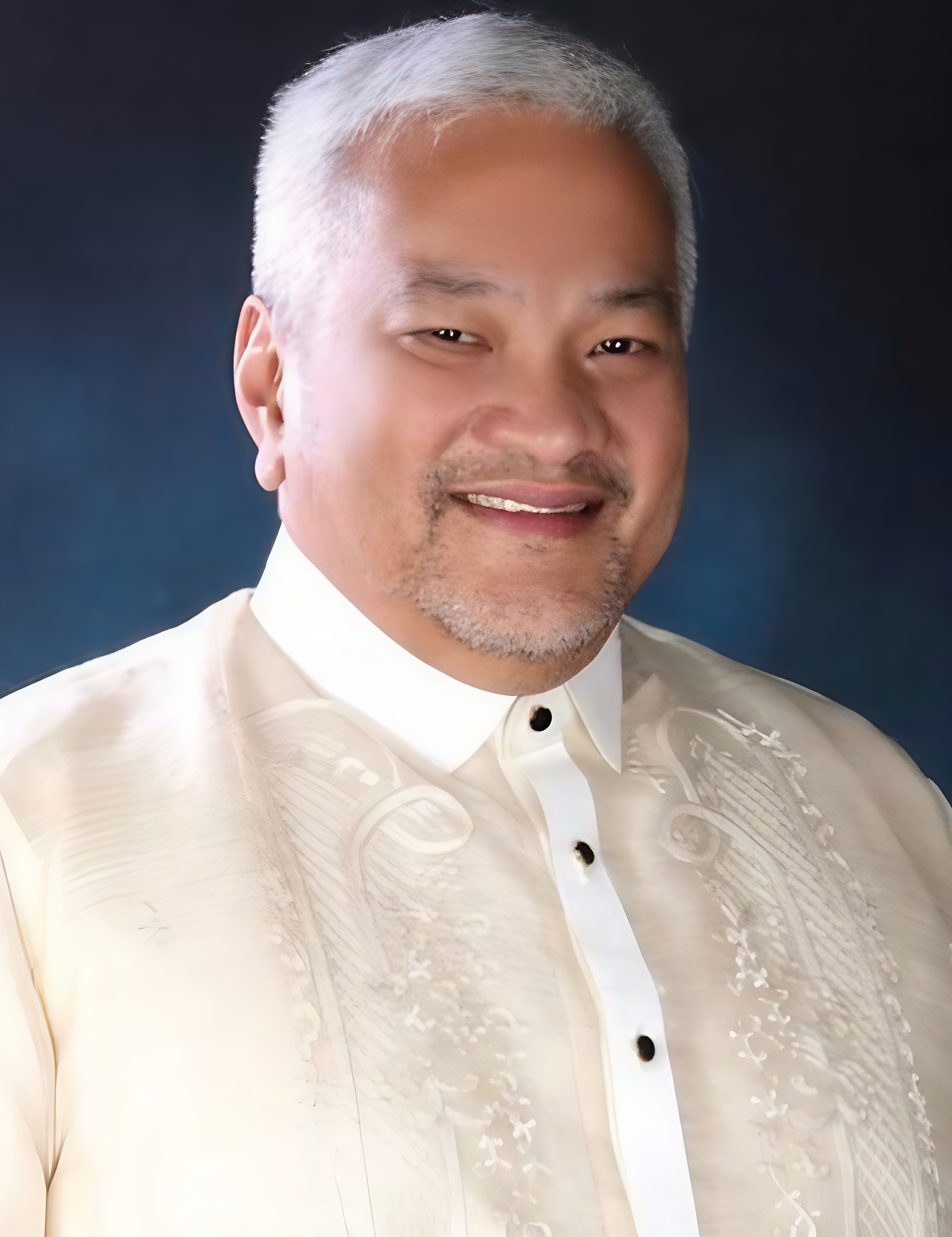
Portrait of Lazatin during his term as mayor of Angeles City

In 2018, Lazatin announced that he would run for mayor of Angeles City under Partido Federal ng Pilipinas with Maria Vicenta Vega-Cabigting as his running mate. He was elected for the first time in 2019 with half a thousand votes and re-elected in 2022 under Kapanalig at Kambilan ning Memalen Pampanga, securing his position with over a thousand votes—the highest in the city’s history, winning in all clustered precincts across the city’s 33 barangays.

In October 2019, during his first term, Lazatin ordered the closure of "Golden Build Limited, Incorporated," a Chinese-operated Philippine offshore gaming operators firm. The company was operating illegally in Angeles City without a business permit and failing to pay taxes for its operations.

In May 2020, Lazatin, with assistance from the National Bureau of Investigation and the Food and Drug Administration, shut down an illegal Chinese pharmacy. The majority of the patients at this unauthorized medical facility were Chinese employees of a POGO, located within a 300-hectare residential resort.

On May 31, 2023, Lazatin most famous project, the "Walang Plastikan: Plastik Palit Bigas Project," became a national finalist and was honored by President Bongbong Marcos Jr. at Malacañang Palace. The project earned recognition for its innovative strategy in reducing hunger and enhancing environmental sustainability.

Lazatin inaugurated the Kanlungan ng Kabataan Reformation Center, in September 2024, a ₱41 million facility dedicated to rehabilitating homeless individuals and supporting youth in need of care and guidance.

On January 28, 2025, Lazatin unveiled the Angeleño Alerto 24/7 Mobile App - Personal On-call Guard Interface (POGI) by the computer information system (CBIS). This 24-hour emergency response mobile application is the first of its kind in the entire province of Pampanga and the whole Region III.

=== Congressman (2025–present) ===
On October 1, 2024, Lazatin submitted his Certificate of Candidacy (COC) for the 2025 Philippine midterm election to contest for the position of Pampanga's First District representative at the Commission on Elections.

Lazatin ran unopposed, securing his position as Pampanga's First District representative, succeeding his half-brother Carmelo Lazatin II, who was proclaimed as mayor-elect of Angeles City. Both Lazatin brothers assumed office on June 30, 2025.

== Electoral history ==
Electoral history of Carmelo Lazatin Jr.
Year	Office	Party		Votes received				Result
Year	Office	Local	National	Total	%	P.	Swing	Result
2013	Councilor of Angeles City	—N/a	Lakas	50,476	46.49%	8th	—N/a	Won
2016	Councilor of Angeles City	Lingap Lugud	—N/a	80,310	—N/a	3rd	—N/a	Won
2019	Mayor of Angeles City	—N/a	PFP	59,192	44.26%	1st	—N/a	Won
2022	Mayor of Angeles City	KAMBILAN	PFP	103,255	70.51%	1st	—N/a	Won
2025	Representative (Pampanga–1st)	KAMBILAN	PFP	262,517	100.00%	1st	—N/a	Unopposed

== Personal life ==
Lazatin is married to Maria Tiffanee Lazatin and has three children, who are often seen supporting his public engagements. His grandfather, Rafael Lazatin, was also a former governor of Pampanga and mayor of Angeles City.

House of Representatives of the Philippines
Preceded by Carmelo Lazatin II	Representative for Pampanga's 1st district 2025–present	Incumbent
Political offices
Preceded by Edgardo Pamintuan Sr.	Mayor of Angeles City; 2019–2025	Succeeded by Carmelo Lazatin II
