= Edgardo Pamintuan Sr. =

Filipino lawyer and politician (born 1949)

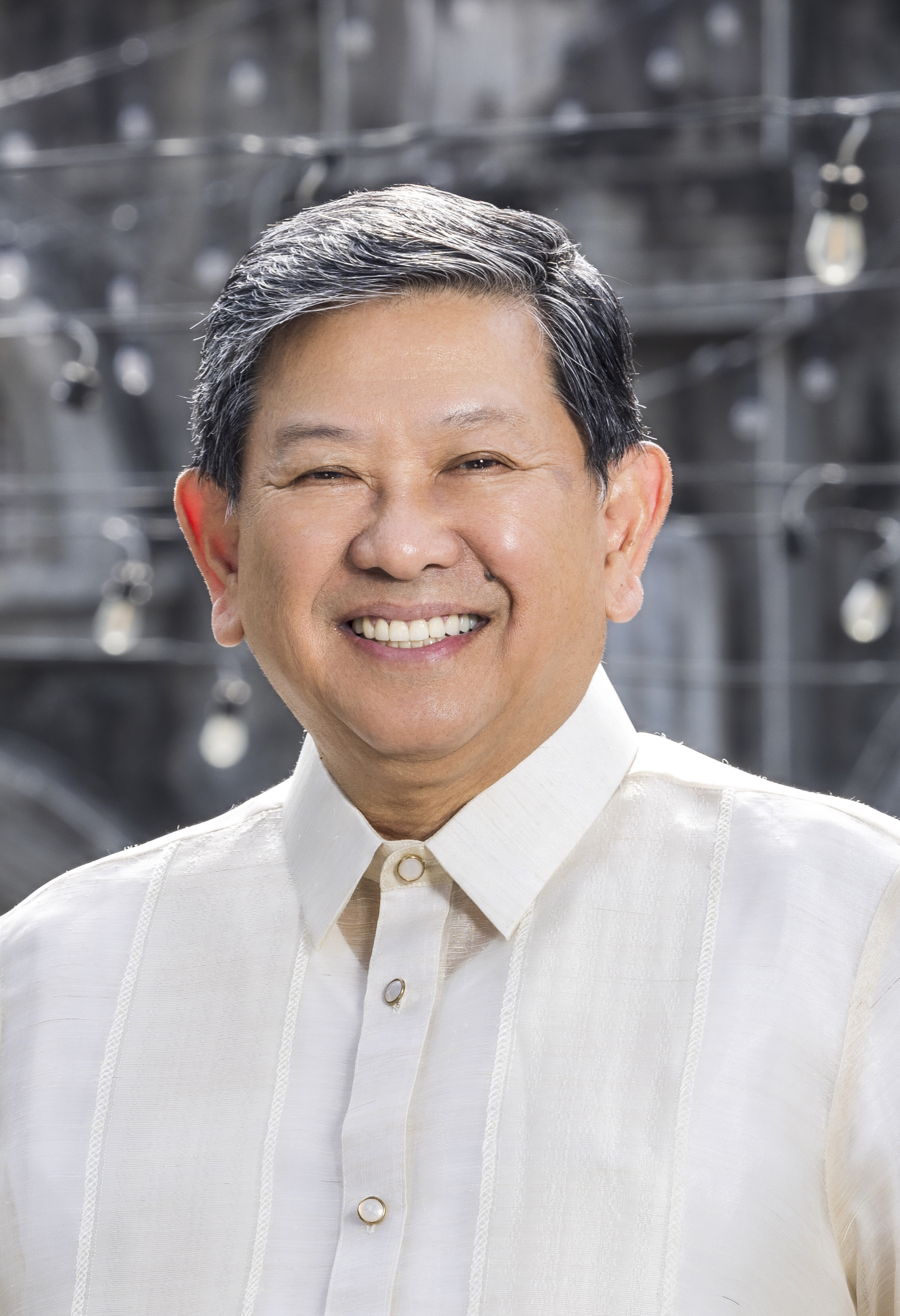
- Official portrait, 2026

Chairman of the Clark Development Corporation
- Incumbent
- Assumed office February 11, 2021
- Appointed by: Rodrigo Duterte
- Preceded by: Jose de Jesus

30th and 33rd Mayor of Angeles City
- In office June 30, 2010 – June 30, 2019
- Vice Mayor: Vicky Vega-Cabigting (2010–2016); Bryan Matthew Nepomuceno (2016–2019)
- Preceded by: Francis Nepomuceno
- Succeeded by: Carmelo Lazatin Jr.
- In office June 30, 1992 – March 7, 1998 (Note: Suspended on March 7, 1998)
- Vice Mayor: Ricardo Zalamea (1992–1995); Francis Nepomuceno (1995–1998)
- Preceded by: Antonio Abad Santos
- Succeeded by: Maximo Sangil (Note: took over since March 7, 1998)

Presidential Adviser for External Affairs
- In office 2004–2010
- President: Gloria Macapagal Arroyo

6th General Manager of the National Housing Authority
- In office 2001–2004
- President: Gloria Macapagal Arroyo
- Preceded by: Angelo Leynes
- Succeeded by: Federico Laxa

Vice Mayor of Angeles City
- In office February 2, 1988 – June 30, 1992
- Mayor: Antonio Abad Santos
- Preceded by: Antonio Abad Santos
- Succeeded by: Ricardo Zalamea
Party positions held
Chairman of the Partido Abe Kapampangan
Incumbent
Assumed office
March 28, 2012

Personal details
- Born: Edgardo Dizon Pamintuan; February 23, 1949 (age 77) Angeles, Pampanga, Philippines
- Party: PAK/ABE (since 2012)
- Other political affiliations: Lakas (until 2012)
- Spouse: Herminia de Guzman
- Children: 3, including Edu
- Education: San Beda College (LL.B.)
- Occupation: Lawyer, politician

Edgardo "Ed" Dizon Pamintuan Sr. GCrL (Tagalog: [edˈɡaɾdo paminˈtuʔan]; born February 23, 1949) is a Filipino lawyer and former politician. He is currently serving as chairman of Clark Development Corporation since 2021. He served as 33rd mayor of Angeles City from 2010 to 2019, a position he previously held as 30th mayor from 1992 to 1998. He also served as vice mayor of Angeles City from 1988 to 1992.

== Early life and career ==
Pamintuan was born on February 23, 1949, in the then-municipality of Angeles in Pampanga to Alberto Pamintuan, a former Vice Mayor of Angeles City and Leonila Dizon. He studied Holy Angel College (now Holy Angel University) for his secondary education. He took up Bachelor of Laws at the San Beda College. In 1979, Pamintuan passed the Philippine Bar Examination.

Pamintuan served as a human rights lawyer during the Marcos dictatorship in the 1980s.

== Political career ==
=== Vice Mayor of Angeles City (1988–1992) ===
Pamintuan started his career in politics as vice mayor of Angeles City from 1988 to 1992.

=== Mayor of Angeles City (1992–1998) ===
In 1992, Pamintuan was elected as mayor of Angeles City, serving until 1998.

=== 1998 House of Representatives bid ===
In the 1998 elections, Pamintuan ran for representative of the first district of Pampanga but lost to Francis Nepomuceno.

=== Arroyo administration official ===
In 2001, Pamintuan was appointed as General Manager of the National Housing Authority by President Gloria Macapagal Arroyo.

Pamintuan served as Presidential Adviser for External Affairs from 2004 to 2010. He also a chairman of Subic-Clark Alliance for Development from 2008 to 2010.

=== Return to Mayor of Angeles City (2010–2019) ===
In the 2010 elections, Pamintuan returned as mayor of Angeles City after a landslide victory over re-electionist Mayor Francis Nepomuceno.

In 2016, Pamintuan served as national president for League of Cities of the Philippines until 2019.

In August 2016, Pamintuan became a member of the panel for the peace process between the government and the CPP-NPA-NDF in Oslo, Norway.

=== 2019 House of Representatives bid ===
In the 2019 elections, Pamintuan was the first nominee of ABE Kapampangan Partylist but failed to obtain a seat and garnered only 83,379 votes.

== Later career ==
In February 2021, Pamintuan was appointed as chairman of the Clark Development Corporation by President Rodrigo Duterte.

== Personal life ==
Pamintuan is married to Herminia de Guzman and has three children including Edu Pamintuan.

On September 28, 2021, Pamintuan announced his retirement from politics.

== Electoral history ==
=== 2016 ===
2016 Angeles City local elections
Party	Candidate	Votes	%
PAK/ABE	Edgardo Pamintuan Sr.	76,540	56.65%
Lingap Lugud	Lito Lapid	45,710	33.83%
Independent	Maria Vicenta Vega-Cabigting	12,864	9.52%
Total votes		135,114	100.00%
PAK/ABE hold			

=== 2013 ===
2013 Angeles City local elections
Party	Candidate	Votes	%
PAK/ABE	Edgardo Pamintuan Sr.	59,504	54.80%
Lakas	Carmelo Lazatin Sr.	45,535	41.94%
Invalid or blank votes		3,544	3.26%
Total votes		108,583	100.00%
PAK/ABE hold			

=== 2010 ===
2010 Angeles City local elections
Party	Candidate	Votes	%
Lakas–Kampi	Edgardo Pamintuan Sr.	60,562	55.80
NPC	Francis Nepomuceno	34,105	31.42
Liberal	Rodelio Mamac Sr.	13,875	12.78
Valid ballots		108,542	96.81
Invalid or blank votes		3,578	3.19
Total votes		112,120	100.00
Lakas–Kampi gain from NPC			

=== 1998 ===
1998 Philippine House of Representatives elections
Candidate	Party	Votes	%
Francis Nepomuceno	Laban ng Makabayang Masang Pilipino	71,802	43.73
Edgardo Pamintuan Sr.	Lakas–NUCD–UMDP	62,237	37.91
Reynaldo Guiao	Independent	28,834	17.56
Eliseo Siopangco	Independent	741	0.45
Florante Quizon	Partido para sa Demokratikong Reporma	574	0.35
Total		164,188	100.00
Source: Commission on Elections

== Honors ==
=== National honors ===
- Grand Cross of the Order of Lakandula with Rank of Bayani (2010)

== Notes ==
Government offices
Preceded by Jose de Jesus	Chairman of the Clark Development Corporation; 2021–present	Incumbent
Preceded by Angelo Leynes	General Manager of the National Housing Authority; 2001–2004	Succeeded by Federico Laxa
Political offices
Preceded by Antonio Abad Santos	Mayor of Angeles City; 1992–1998; 2010–2019	Succeeded by Maximo Sangil
Preceded by Francis Nepomuceno	Mayor of Angeles City; 1992–1998; 2010–2019	Succeeded by Carmelo Lazatin Jr.
Preceded by Antonio Abad Santos	Vice Mayor of Angeles City; 1988–1992	Succeeded by Ricardo Zalamea
Party political offices
New political party	Chairman of the Partido Abe Kapampangan; 2012–present	Incumbent
