= Partido Abe Kapampangan =

Local political party in Angeles City, Philippines

Kapampangan Friendship Party Partido Abe Kapampangan
- President: Alexander Cauguiran
- Chairman: Edgardo Pamintuan Sr.
- Founded: March 28, 2012
- Headquarters: Angeles City
- Ideology: Populism; Grassroots democracy
- Political position: Centre
- Colors: Green
- Slogan: Agyu Tamu! (Kaya Natin! in Filipino, We Can! in English)
- House of Representatives (Angeles City seats): 0 / 1
- City Mayor: 0 / 1
- City Vice Mayor: 0 / 1
- Angeles City Council: 1 / 12

Website
- http://abetamu.wordpress.com/

The Partido Abe Kapampangan (PAK/ABE; English: Kapampangan Friendship Party) is a local city-based political party in Angeles City. The party is headed by former Angeles City Mayor Edgardo Pamintuan Sr. and former city's chief of staff, Alexander Cauguiran.

It was the dominant political group in Angeles City, with nearly all elected officials under its banner from 2010 to 2022 local elections, when it was last active. Since then, the party has ceased participating in local elections in the city.

== Electoral performance ==
=== Angeles mayoral and vice mayoral elections ===
Year	Mayoral election				Vice mayoral election			
Year	Candidate	Votes	Vote share	Result	Candidate	Votes	Vote share	Result
2010	Edgardo Pamintuan Sr.	60,562	63.98%	Won	Vicky Vega	61,289	62.60%	Won
2013	Edgardo Pamintuan Sr.	59,504	54.80%	Won	Vicky Vega	33,828	53.50%	Won
2016	Edgardo Pamintuan Sr.	76,540	60.89%	Won	Bryan Matthew Nepomuceno	56,119	45.57%	Won
2019	Bryan Matthew Nepomuceno	45,711	34.68%	Lost	Edu Pamintuan	48,116	36.56%	Lost

=== Sangguniang Panlungsod elections ===
City Council
Year	Seats won	Result
2010	10 / 10	Supermajority
2013	7 / 10	Majority
2016	7 / 10	Majority
2019	7 / 10	Majority
2022	(Note: Edu Pamintuan and Alex Indiongco) 2 / 10	Minority
