= Carmelo Lazatin Sr. =

Filipino politician and businessman (1934–2018)

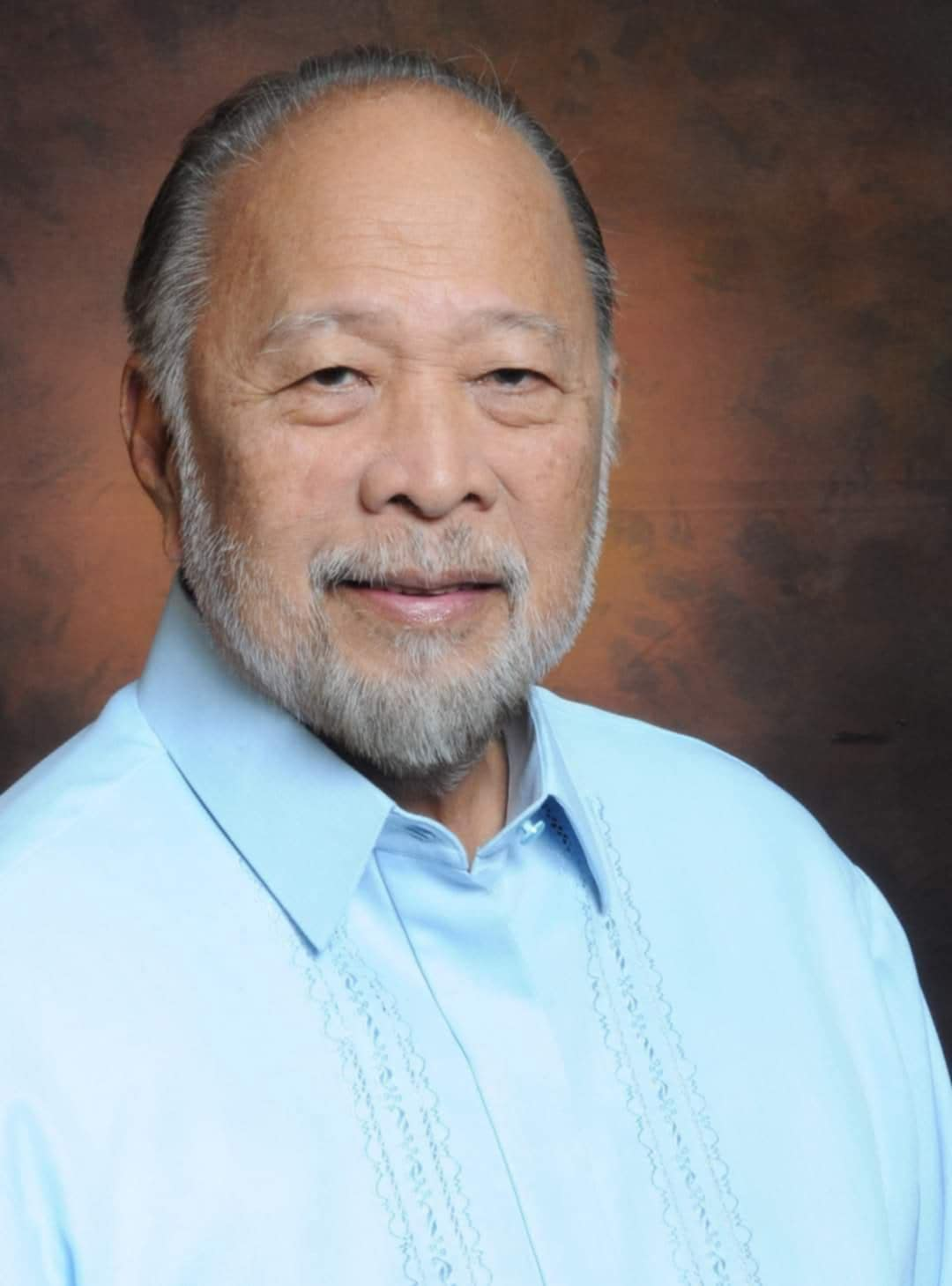
- Lazatin in 2018

Member of the House of Representatives from Pampanga's 1st congressional district
- In office June 30, 2007 – June 30, 2013
- Preceded by: Francis Nepomuceno
- Succeeded by: Yeng Guiao
- In office June 30, 1987 – June 30, 1998
- Preceded by: District re-established Post last held by Jose B. Lingad
- Succeeded by: Francis Nepomuceno

31st Mayor of Angeles City
- In office June 30, 1998 – June 30, 2007
- Vice Mayor: Ricardo Zalamea
- Preceded by: Maximo Sangil
- Succeeded by: Francis Nepomuceno

Personal details
- Born: June 28, 1934 Angeles, Pampanga, Philippine Islands
- Died: December 12, 2018 (aged 84) San Fernando, Pampanga, Philippines
- Party: Lakas (1995–2018)
- Other political affiliations: PAK/ABE (2012); LDP (1992–1995); PDP–Laban (1988–1992); LnB (1987–1988); UNIDO (1986–1987)
- Spouse: Iluminada Gurion
- Children: 9, including Janet, Carmelo Jr., and Carmelo II
- Relatives: Lazatin family
- Education: University of Santo Tomas (BS)
- Occupation: Politician, businessman

Carmelo Feliciano Lazatin Sr. (June 28, 1934 – December 12, 2018), also known as Tarzan Lazatin, was a Filipino politician and businessman who served as the representative of the 1st district of Pampanga in the House of Representatives of the Philippines from 2007 to 2013, a position he previously held from 1987 to 1998. He also served as the 31st mayor of Angeles City from 1998 to 2007.

== Early life and education ==
Lazatin was born on June 28, 1934, in the then-municipality of Angeles in Pampanga to Rafael Lazatin and Loreto Feliciano. He studied mechanical engineering at the University of Santo Tomas, graduating in 1954.

== Political career ==
=== 1980 Angeles City mayoralty bid ===
In 1980 elections, Lazatin entered politics to ran as mayor of Angeles City but he lost to Francisco Nepomuceno.

=== House of Representatives (1987–1998) ===
Lazatin was member of the House of Representatives of the Philippines representing the 1st district of Pampanga from 1987 to 1998.

As a congressman, he built resettlement centers in Pampanga's 1st district.

=== Mayor of Angeles City (1998–2007) ===
From 1998 to 2007, he was elected as mayor of Angeles City for three consecutive terms.

=== Return to House of Representatives (2007–2013) ===
From 2007 onward, he was again a member of the House of Representatives as a member of Lakas-CMD from 2007 to 2013.

He also authored Republic Act 10164 which converted the town of Mabalacat into a city.

=== 2013 Angeles City mayoralty bid ===
In 2013 elections, Lazatin ran again as mayor of Angeles City but he lost to Edgardo Pamintuan Sr. and garnered only 45,535 votes.

=== Barangay politics (2018) ===
In October 2018, Lazatin became a barangay captain of Balibago after he defeated his opponent Tess Mamac, the wife of then-outgoing Balibago barangay captain Rodelio Mamac until his death.

== Death ==
Lazatin died on December 12, 2018, due to cardiac arrest at his residence at Barangay Telebastagan in San Fernando, Pampanga, and was cremated.

Political offices
Preceded by Maximo Sangil	Mayor of Angeles City; 1998–2007	Succeeded by Francis Nepomuceno
House of Representatives of the Philippines
Preceded by Jose B. Lingad	Representative of 1st District of Pampanga; 1987–1998; 2007–2013	Succeeded by Francis Nepomuceno
Preceded by Francis Nepomuceno	Representative of 1st District of Pampanga; 1987–1998; 2007–2013	Succeeded by Yeng Guiao
