= Angeles City Council =

Legislative body in the Philippines

Angeles City Council Sangguniang Panlungsod ning Angeles
- 20th City Council
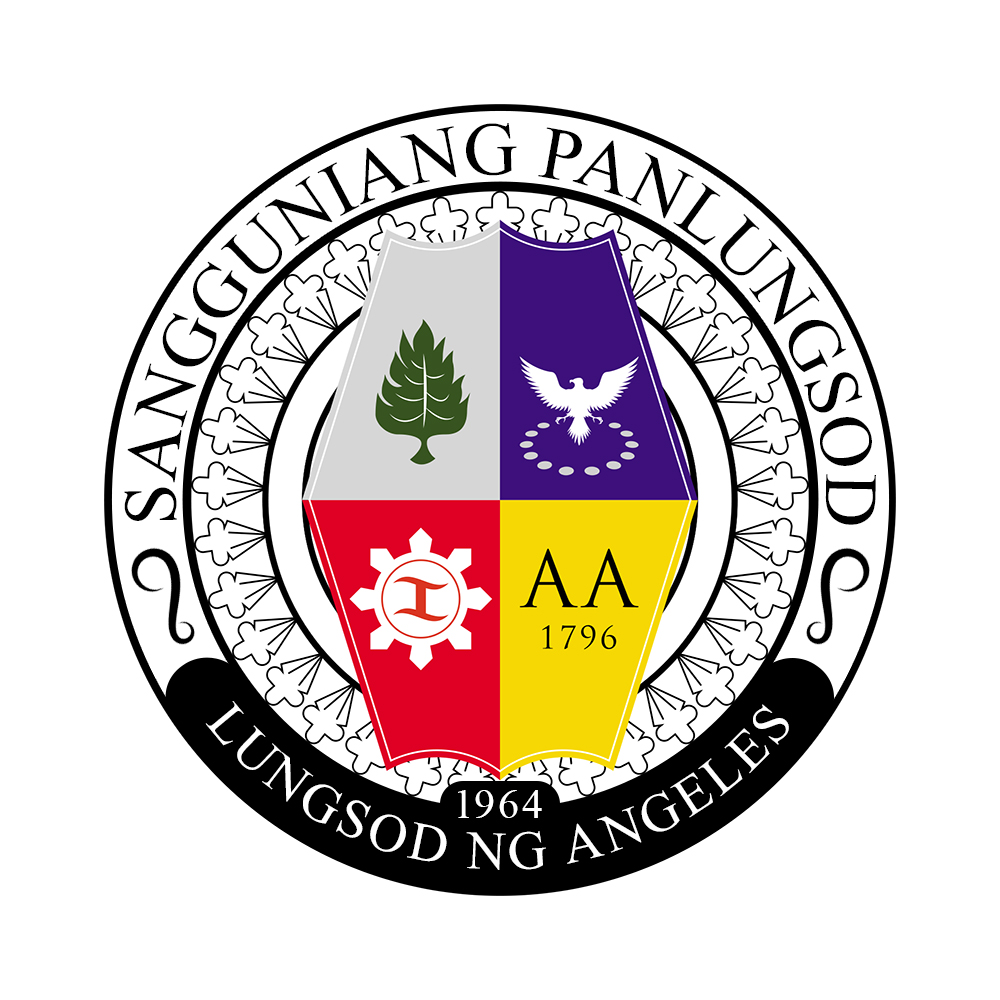

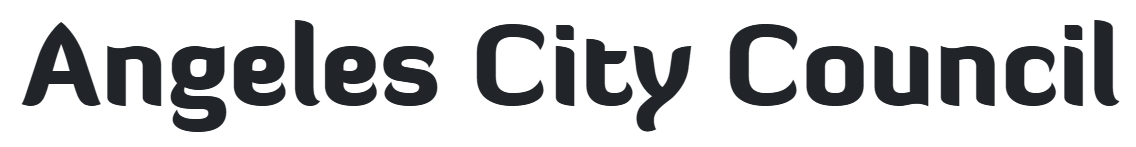

Type
- Type: Unicameral
- Term limits: 3 terms (9 years)

Leadership
- Presiding Officer: Amos B. Rivera (PRP)

Structure
- Seats: 12 councilors (including 2 ex officio members); 1 ex officio presiding officer
- Political groups: Lakas-CMD (8) Independent (2) Nonpartisan (2)
- Length of term: 3 years
- Authority: Angeles City Charter; Local Government Code of the Philippines

Elections
- Voting system: Plurality-at-large voting (10 seats); Indirect elections (2 seats)
- Last election: May 12, 2025
- Next election: May 8, 2028

Meeting place
- Sangguniang Panlungsod Building

Website
- https://angelescity.gov.ph/city_council Official Facebook Page

The Angeles City Council (Kapampangan: Sangguniang Panlungsod ning Angeles; Tagalog: Sangguniang Panlungsod ng Angeles) is the legislature of Angeles City; a highly urbanized city in the Province of Pampanga, Philippines. It is composed of 12 councilors, with 10 councilors elected at-large and two councilors elected from the ranks of barangay (neighborhood) chairmen and the Sangguniang Kabataan (SK; youth councils). The presiding officer of the council is the Vice Mayor, who is an ex-officio member elected city-wide.

Similar with other local legislatures, the council is responsible for creating city ordinances under Angeles' jurisdiction. The mayor has the power to veto proposed ordinances, but the council can override it with a two-thirds supermajority.

== History ==
The Angeles City Council traces its origins to the early 20th century during the American colonial period, when the Philippine Commission introduced municipal governments under the Philippine Commission Act No. 82 (1901). Angeles, then a municipality in Pampanga, had a municipal council composed of a presidente (mayor), vice presidente, and councilors (vocales) who served under American-appointed supervision.

On January 1, 1964, Angeles was converted into a chartered city through Republic Act No. 3700, signed into law by President Diosdado Macapagal, a native of Pampanga. This granted the city its own Sangguniang Panlungsod (City Council), modeled after the national legislative system. The first council under the chartered city law had both appointed and elected members, with the Vice Mayor serving as the Presiding Officer.

In 1998, RA 8509 redefined Angeles as a highly urbanized city (HUC) and reaffirmed its independent charter, separating it administratively from the province of Pampanga. This elevated the status of the Sangguniang Panlungsod, giving it jurisdiction over a rapidly growing city economy and a more complex urban population.

== Members ==
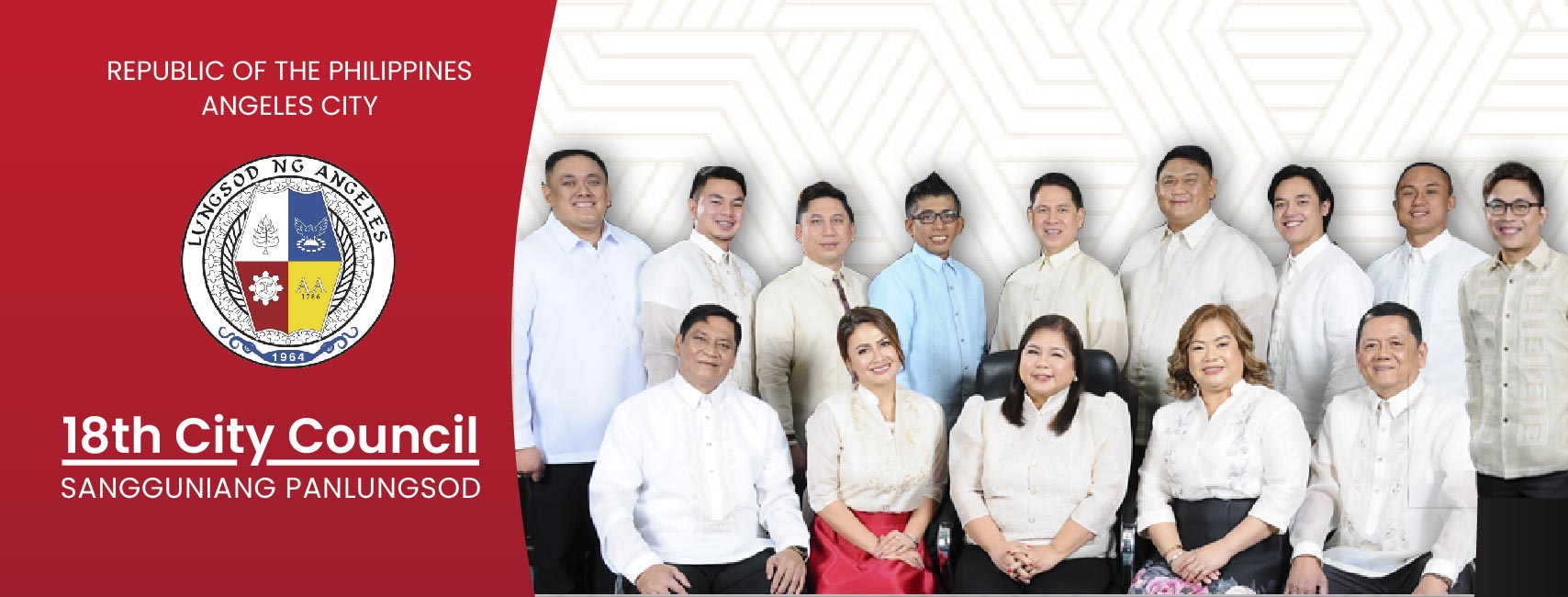
18th City Council (2019-2022)
Position	Name	Party
Presiding officer	Vicky Vega	PFP
City councilors	Arvin M. Suller	PFP
City councilors	Danilo Lacson	PAK/ABE
City councilors	Joseph "PG" Ponce	PAK/ABE
City councilors	Joan Crystal D. Aguas	PAK/ABE
City councilors	Joseph Alfie Bonifacio	PAK/ABE
City councilors	Thelma Indiongco	PAK/ABE
City councilors	Marino Bañola	PFP
City councilors	Amos Rivera	PAK/ABE
City councilors	Jesus "Jay" Sangil	Kambilan
City councilors	Raco Paolo S. Del Rosario	PAK/ABE

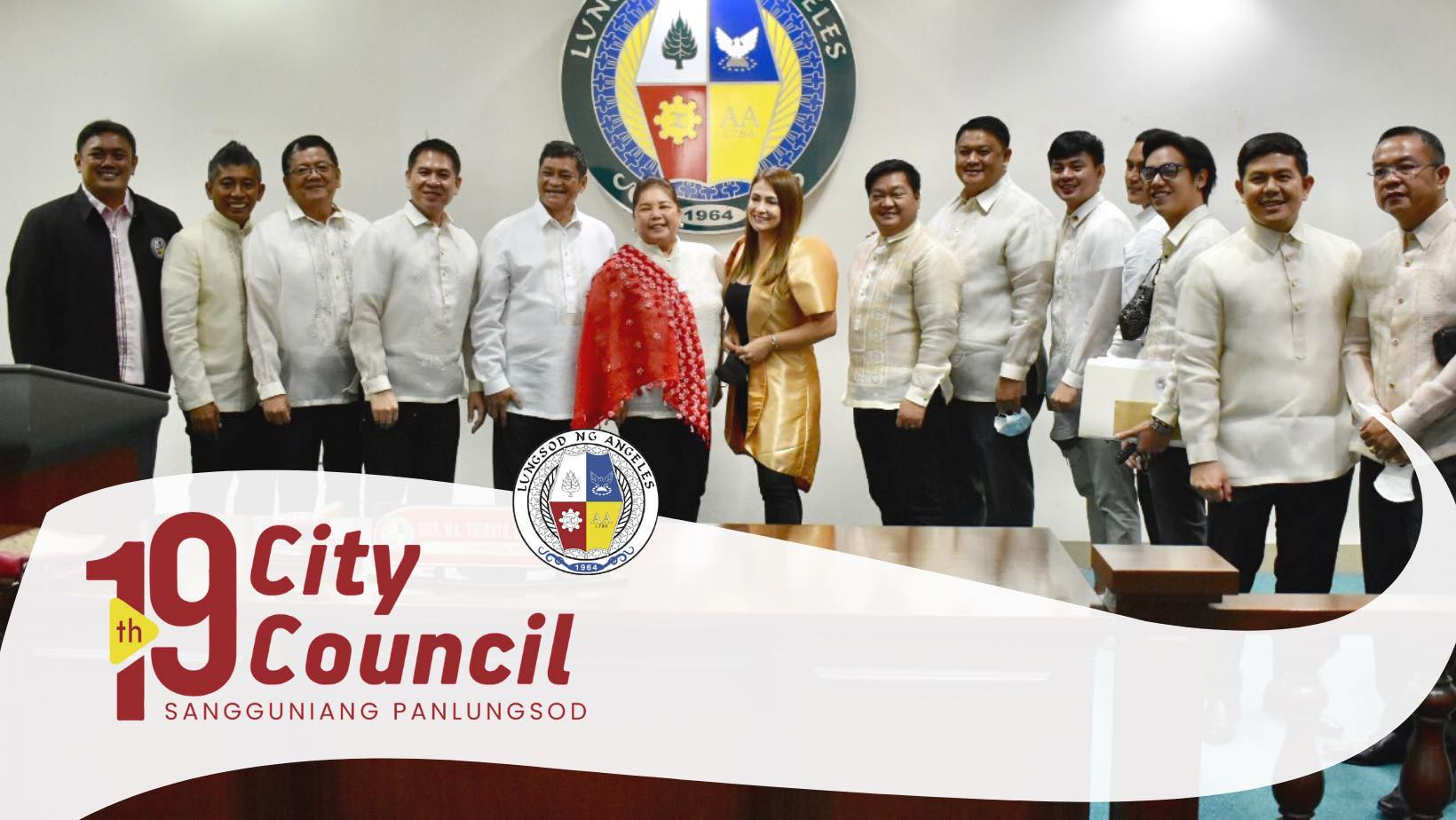
19th City Council (2022-2025)
Position	Name	Party
Presiding officer	Vicky Vega	Kambilan
City councilors	Arvin M. Suller	Kambilan
City councilors	Joan Crystal D. Aguas	Kambilan
City councilors	Danilo Lacson	Kambilan
City councilors	Jesus "Jay" Sangil	Kambilan
City councilors	Marino Bañola	Kambilan
City councilors	Alexander P. Indiongco	PAK/ABE
City councilors	Raco Paolo S. Del Rosario	Kambilan
City councilors	Edgardo D.G. Pamintuan Jr.	PAK/ABE
City councilors	Joseph Alfie Bonifacio	Kambilan
City councilors	Chris Cortez	PROMDI

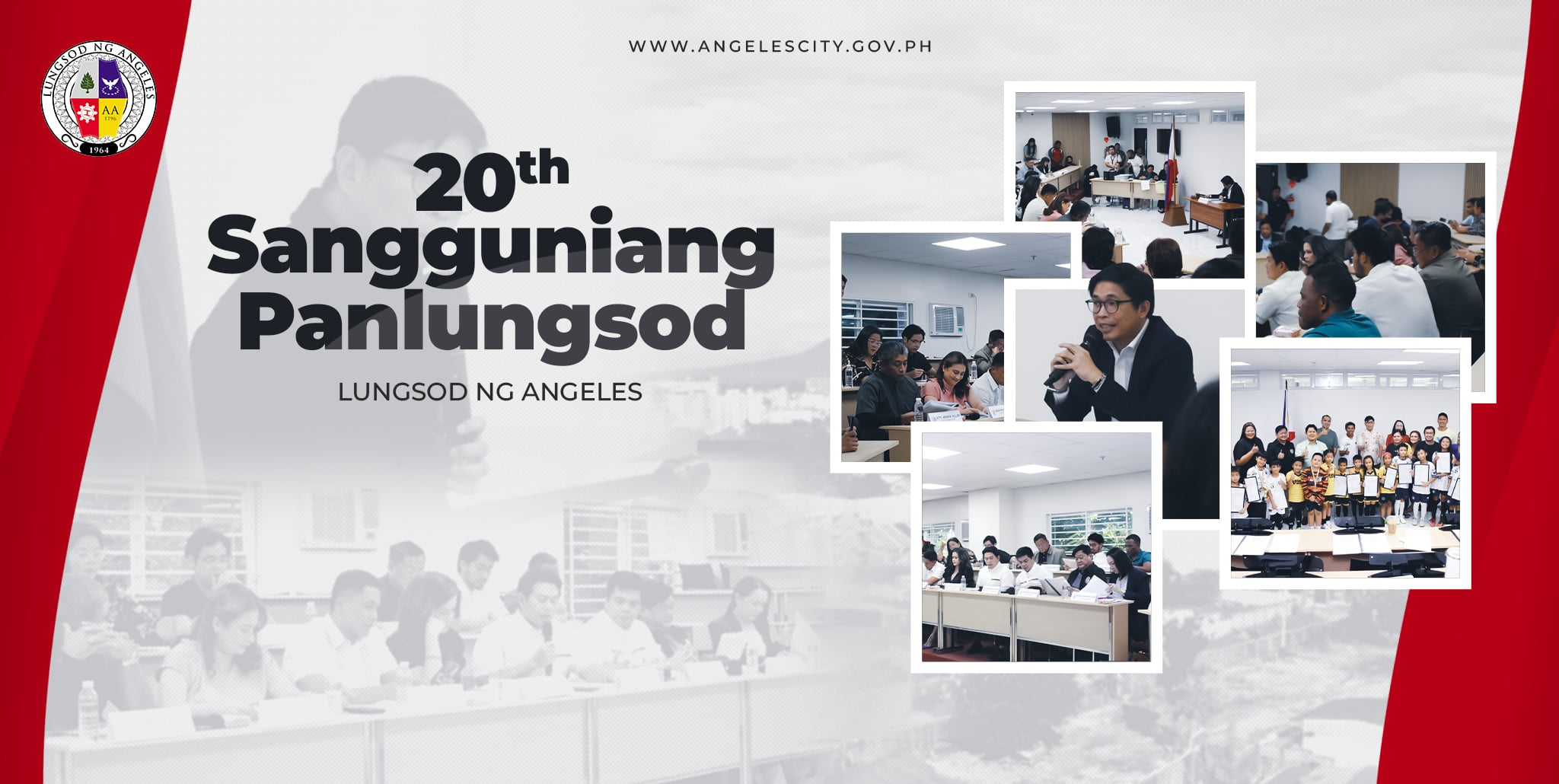
20th City Council (2025-2028)
Position	Name	Party
Presiding officer	Amos B. Rivera	PRP
City councilors	Arvin M. Suller	Lakas
City councilors	Joan Crystal D. Aguas	Lakas
City councilors	Marino D. Bañola	Lakas
City councilors	Maricel Morales-Agoncillo	Independent
City councilors	Edgardo D.G. Pamintuan Jr.	Lakas
City councilors	Aaron L. Pineda	Lakas
City councilors	Michelle M. Bonifacio	Lakas
City councilors	Alexander P. Indiongco	Lakas
City councilors	Jeselle Ann Dayrit	Independent
City councilors	Raco Paolo S. Del Rosario	Lakas
ABC President	Danilo Nacu	Nonpartisan
SK Federation President	Richard Dela Cruz-Gaza Jr.	Nonpartisan

== Controversies ==
In October 2024, the Angeles City Council faced anti‑graft and corruption complaints filed by United Pilipino Against Crime and Corruption (UPACC) with the Office of the Ombudsman. The complaint alleged improper hiring of 171 “ghost employees” in 2022 by councilors—including Vice Mayor Vicky Vega‑Cabigting and all 10 councilors—and estimated public funds misused amounted to ₱24.6 million.
