= Lazatin =

Lazatin is a Filipino surname of Kapampangan origin. Notable people with the surname include:

- Rafael Lazatin (1906-1993), Filipino politician and businessman
- Carmelo Lazatin Sr. (1934-2018), Filipino politician and businessman
- Carmelo Lazatin Jr. (born 1969), Filipino politician and businessman
- Carmelo Lazatin II (born 1970), Filipino politician and businessman
- Janet Lazatin (born 1966), Filipino academic administrator, business executive and licensed real estate broker

== See also ==
- Lazatin family
