= Lazatin family =

Filipino business and political family

- Business and political family
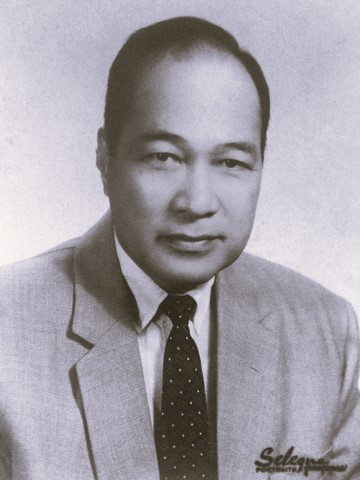
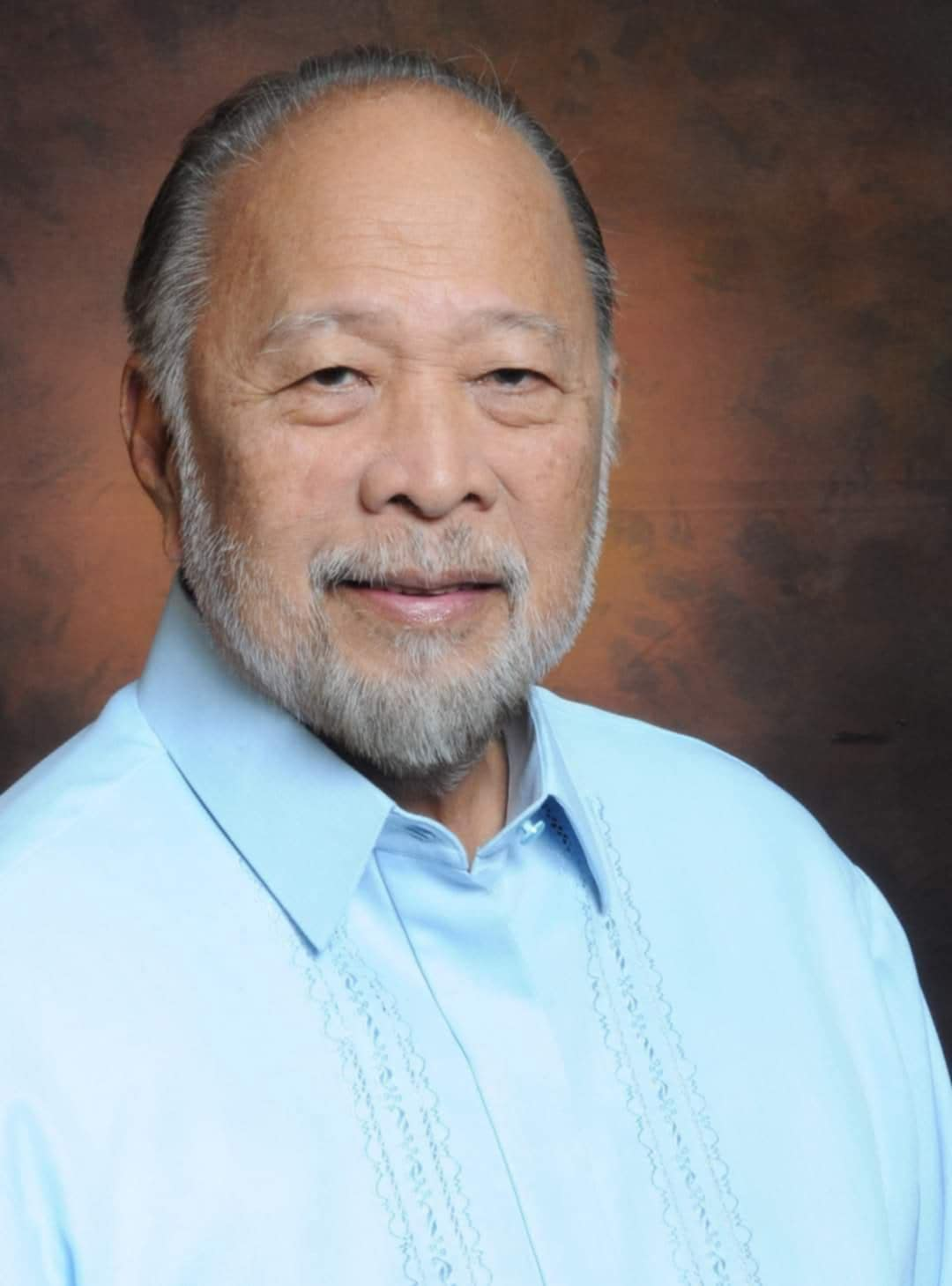
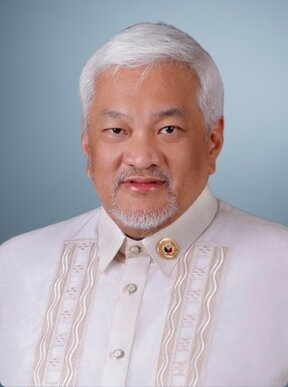
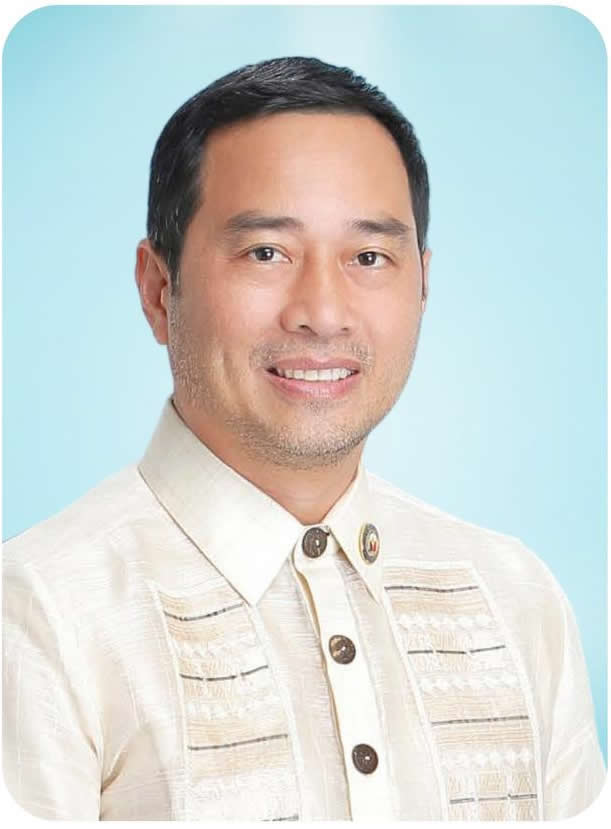
- Rafael Lazatin Carmelo Lazatin Sr. Carmelo Lazatin Jr. Carmelo Lazatin II
- Country: Philippines
- Current region: Angeles City and San Fernando, Pampanga
- Origin: Mexico, Pampanga, Captaincy General of the Philippines
- Founder: Don Esteban Lazatin
- Titles: List: Member of the House of Representatives; Member of the Batasang Pambansa; Governor of Pampanga; Board Member of the Pampanga Provincial Board; Mayor of Angeles City; Councilor of Angeles City; President of the City College of Angeles
- Members: Rafael Lazatin; Carmelo Lazatin Sr. Carmelo Lazatin Jr. Carmelo Lazatin II; Janet Lazatin and others
- Traditions: Roman Catholicism

The Lazatin family (Tagalog: [lɐˈzatɪn]) is a prominent political and business family in Angeles City and the province of Pampanga in the Philippines.

== Origins and history ==
The family's roots trace to Don Esteban Lazatin (born 1834, Mexico, Pampanga), a wealthy landowner and businessman. He amassed large sugar and rice estates in Pampanga and was among the earliest agrarian-industrial entrepreneurs. He married Miguela de Ocampo, and among their several children was Trinidad Lazatin, whose son Rafael “Feleng” Lazatin (born 7 November 1906 in Angeles) became a notable political leader.

== Business and heritage ==
The Lazatin entrepreneurial legacy includes Lazatin Vinegar, founded in 1931 producing sugar‑cane vinegar, later modernized to Lazatin Consolidated Corporation (LCC) in the 1950s to adopt stainless‑steel production and German technology.

Aside from their business ventures, the family also founded Republic Central Colleges (RCC) in 1946, a private, non-sectarian higher education institution offering programs in teacher education, business, and information technology, established by Rafael Lazatin and Victoria Feliciano-Lazatin.

The Lazatin House, located in San Fernando, Pampanga, is a heritage Bahay na Bato constructed in 1925 by Serafin Lazatin y Ocampo and Encarnacion Singian y Torres. It served as headquarters for Japanese General Masaharu Homma during World War II and was later restored and designated a Heritage House in 2003. Ownership remains with the Lazatin family.

== Modern Political Figures ==
=== Rafael Antonio "Feleng" Lacsamana Lazatin (1906–1993) ===
Rafael Lazatin studied commerce and agriculture, delayed by early family responsibilities and activated into politics later in life. He became municipal mayor of Angeles in 1946, then Governor of Pampanga (1951–1959), and City Mayor of Angeles (1972–1980). He was also an opposition assemblyman in the Batasang Pambansa (1984–1986) during the Marcos era.

=== Carmelo “Tarzan” Feliciano Lazatin Sr. (1934–2018) ===
A son of Rafael Lazatin, Carmelo “Tarzan” Lazatin Sr. served as Representative of Pampanga’s 1st District from 1987 to 1998 and again from 2007 to 2013, and as Angeles City Mayor from 1998 to 2007. As congressman, he championed resettlement housing projects across Pampanga and authored, converting Mabalacat into a component city. Under his administration, Angeles City became the first ISO‑certified LGU outside Metro Manila and provided affordable housing to approximately 15,000 families. He died of cardio‑pulmonary failure on December 12, 2018.

=== Janet Rita Bautista Lazatin (born August 1, 1966) ===
Janet, older sister of Jon Lazatin and half-sister of Pogi Lazatin, is the current and 4th President of the City College of Angeles, taking office on June 1, 2026. Holding a doctorate in business management, she previously served as Assistant Secretary of Tourism from 2009 to 2010 and later as Director III at DSWD. In 2010, she ventured into politics as the nominee of the Pilipino Association for Country–Urban Poor Youth Advancement and Welfare (PACYAW), garnering 143,553 votes but falling short of securing a seat in the House of Representatives.

=== Carmelo “Pogi” Gurion Lazatin Jr. (born August 28, 1969) ===
Pogi Lazatin Jr., son of Carmelo Sr., earned degrees from Angeles University Foundation and Republic Central Colleges. He served as Angeles City councilor from 2013 to 2019, authoring over 80 local ordinances and spearheading legislation on environmental protection, education, and senior citizen welfare. In 2019, he became the 31st Mayor of Angeles City, serving until 2025, and in June 2025 took office as Representative of Pampanga’s 1st District, winning unopposed in the 2025 elections.

=== Carmelo “Jon” Bautista Lazatin II (born June 4, 1970) ===
Younger half‑brother of Pogi, Jon Lazatin II represented Pampanga’s 1st District as congressman from 2016 to 2025, running unopposed in 2019 and 2022. In June 2025, he succeeded Pogi as the 32nd Mayor of Angeles City. During the 2024–2025 campaign cycle, he switched affiliation from PDP–Laban to Lakas–CMD and was among 95 party members voting to impeach Vice President Sara Duterte. He began campaigning after a long political lineage including his grandfather Rafael and father Carmelo Sr., and uncle Francisco who also served as mayor.

== Legacy ==
The Lazatin family is consistently listed among elite political dynasties in Pampanga, alongside the Nepomuceno and Pamintuan families. Their political influence in Angeles City and Pampanga spans over seven decades.

== See also ==
- List of political families in the Philippines
- Lazatin House
