= Holy Angel University =

Roman Catholic university in Angeles, Philippines

- Pamantasang Banal na Anghel (Filipino)
- Former names: Holy Angel Academy (1933–1961); Holy Angel College (1961–1981)
- Motto: Laus Deo Semper (Latin)
- Motto in English: Praise God Always
- Type: Private research non-profit coeducational Basic and Higher education institution
- Established: June 1933; 93 years ago
- Founders: Juan Nepomuceno; Fr. Pedro Santos
- Religious affiliation: Roman Catholic
- Academic affiliations: PAASCU PACUCOA ACCU
- Chairperson: Most Rev. Florentino G. Lavarias, D.D.
- President: Engr. Leopoldo Valdes, Jr., MBA, MA (OIC)
- Vice-president: List: Edna Marriza Santos, MA (VP for Institutional Effectiveness); Al D. Biag, EdD, PhD (VP for Academic Affairs); Jocelyn Aniceto, MBA (VP for Finance & Resource Management Services); Robert P. Tantingco, MA (VP for Student Services & Affairs)
- Principal: Maria Teresa N. Punsalan, MAELLT (Basic Education)
- Dean: List: Alfredo Santos, PhD (Dean, School of Arts & Sciences); Albert Morales, DBM (Dean, School of Business & Accountancy); Alma Natividad, PhD (Dean, School of Education); Jaypee Pajarillaga, PhD (Dean, School of Engineering & Architecture); Niño Kabiling, PhD (Dean, College of Criminal Justice Education & Forensics); Mervyn Aldana, DBAHTM (Dean, School of Hospitality & Tourism Management); Marlon Tayag, DIT (Dean, School of Computing); Precious Jean Marquez, PhD (Dean, School of Nursing & Allied Medical Sciences)
- Students: 21,000
- Undergraduates: 16,000
- Location: Holy Angel Avenue cor. Santo Rosario Street, Angeles City, Pampanga, Philippines; 15°07′57″N 120°35′23″E
- Campus: Urban Main Campus Angeles City 8 hectares (20 acres) Satellite Campus Porac, Pampanga 10 hectares (25 acres))
- Newspaper: The Angelite
- Colors: Maroon; Gold; White; Grey
- Nickname: Angelite
- Sporting affiliations: NAASCU
- Mascot: Golden Guardians
- Website: www.hau.edu.ph
- Location in Luzon Location in the Philippines

Holy Angel University is a private Catholic research university in Angeles City, Philippines. Founded in June 1933 by Don Juan Nepomuceno and Fr. Pedro Paulo Santos, who was later named as the Archbishop of Cáceres, it is considered the first lay-founded Catholic school as well as the first co-educational Catholic high school. With a student population of over 21,000, it is the largest private institution of higher education with the largest student population in a single campus in Central Luzon.

== History ==
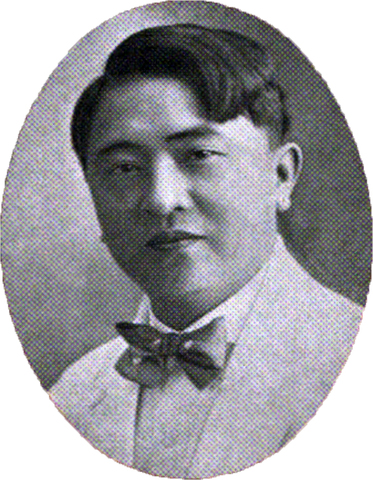
Don Juan D. Nepomuceno, one of the founders of Holy Angel University

=== Establishment ===
Holy Angel University (HAU), located in Angeles City, Philippines, was established in June 1933 as Holy Angel Academy (HAA) by Don Juan D. Nepomuceno and Fr. Pedro P. Santos. Initially, it provided Catholic education to 78 high school students and became the first Catholic co-educational high school run by laypersons in the country.

=== Postwar growth ===
After World War II, the academy expanded its offerings, adding a tertiary department in 1947 and transitioning to a 4-year collegiate program. In 1961, the institution was renamed Holy Angel College (HAC), under the leadership of Don Juan D. Nepomuceno. It continued to grow, introducing various engineering and business programs.

=== University status ===
On December 4, 1981, HAC achieved university status and became Holy Angel University (HAU). The university's growth continued, with expansions in both physical infrastructure and academic offerings, including graduate programs and technical courses.

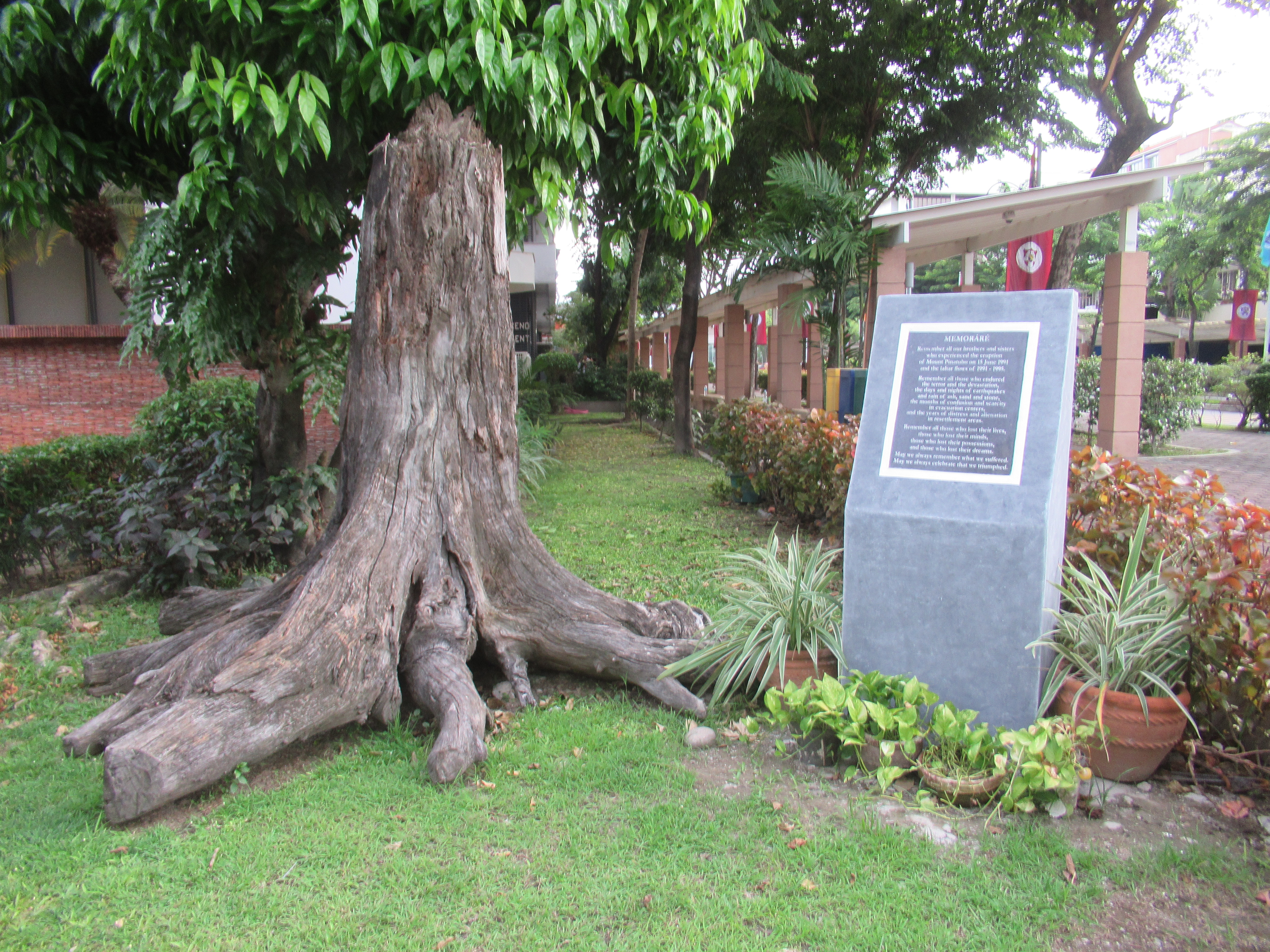
2,970 Year-old prehistoric tree from Abacan River

== Campus ==
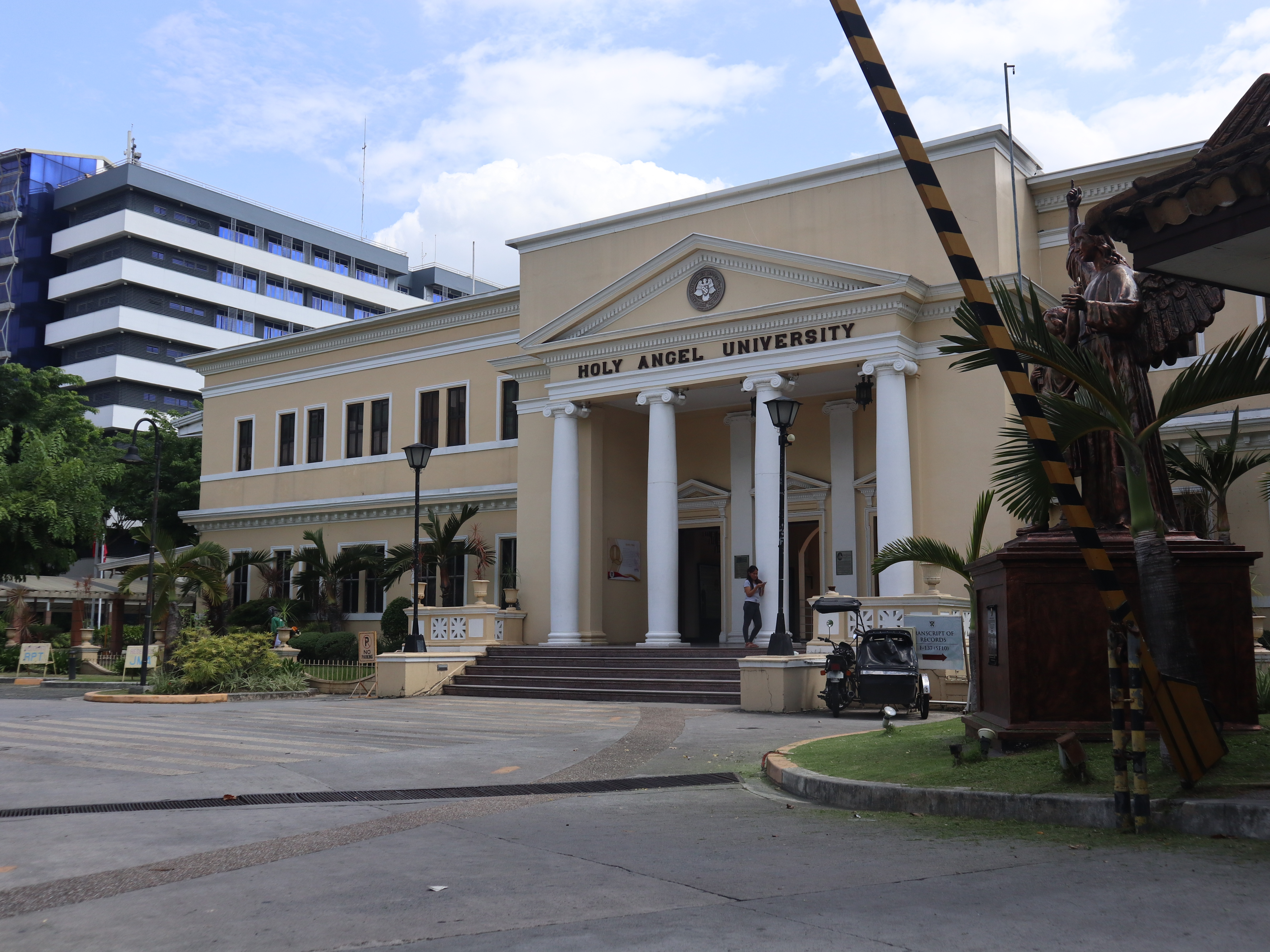
Holy Angel University Main Building

The university sits in an 8-hectare urban campus. The university campus features the Epiphany of Angels Park that has an exhibit of the Seven Archangels and the Holy Guardian Angel. The university houses the original image of the Holy Guardian Angel commissioned by Don Juan Nepomuceno in the University Chapel. The university library is housed at the second and third floors of the San Francisco de Javier building; along with the university theater in the ground floor and the chambers of the University President in the fourth floor.

=== Juan D. Nepomuceno Center for Kapampangan Studies ===
CKP, named after Don Juan D. Nepomuceno, a philanthropist and former Angeles City Mayor, was established in 2001 after HAU hosted the First International Conference on Kapampangan Studies which focused on the study of Kapampangan language, history and culture. It is housed in the 3-story Don Juan D. Nepomuceno Building in HAU and contains a gallery, a museum and a library. Under Robby Tantingco, Director, it publishes SingSing, a quarterly magazine whose name is derived from "Atin Cu Pung Singsing," and Kapampangan Research Journal.

On March 21–22, 2024, CKS spearheaded the First International Conference on Kapampangan Cuisine and Food Tourism at HAU. It featured 35 parallel sessions and 10 plenary sessions on Pampanga's culinary history, culture, food, and traditions.

In 2026, CKS was recognized as Permanent Exhibition of the Year Educational and Institution Museum of the Year at the first Ang MUSEO Awards organized by the Museum Foundation of the Philippines.

== Academics ==
As a Roman Catholic learning institution, aside from the major and professional subjects, all undergraduate students are required to take 12 units of Catholic Theology classes. The students are also required to attend 8 units of physical education class, and a choice from ROTC, civic welfare service training (CWTS) and literacy training service (LTS). The university is home to eight undergraduate colleges, with the School of Business and Accountancy as the oldest. The university also has a high school and laboratory elementary school.

The Commission on Higher Education granted autonomous status to the university and recognized three of its programs as Centers of Development, namely in Business Administration, Industrial Engineering and Teacher Education. It is also accredited by the Philippine Accrediting Association of Schools, Colleges and Universities (PAASCU) and the International Accreditation Council for Business Education (IACBE).

== Notable alumni and faculty ==
- Dennis Anthony Uy - Founder and CEO of Converge ICT
- Emma Tiglao - Filipino actress, model, news anchor, TV presenter, and Miss Grand International 2025
- Ivan Mayrina - Filipino broadcaster, journalist, reporter and news anchor currently working in GMA Network.
- Calvin Abueva - Filipino professional basketball player
- Ronnie Liang - Filipino singer, actor, and a licensed pilot.
- Francis Nepomuceno - Filipino politician
- Rafael Yabut - Filipino engineer
- Cesar L. Villanueva - was the former Dean of the Ateneo Law School in Makati, Philippines.
- Antonio Aquitania - Filipino actor, comedian, host, and model.
- Florentino Lavarias - current archbishop of San Fernando.
- Teresito Sison - Faculty member who was also a seminarian-activist during Martial law under Ferdinand Marcos; campaigned for the rights of teachers, farmers, and of laborers in Clark Air Base, but died in 1980 due to health decline after being tortured in various Martial Law detention centers. Honored as a martyr of the fight against authoritarianism at the Philippines' Bantayog ng mga Bayani memorial.
- Francesca Taruc - Filipina actress, TV host, model and beauty pageant titleholder who was crowned Miss Freedom of the World Philippines 2018.
- Rabin Angeles - Filipino actor, model, singer and dancer
- Vicky Vega - former vice mayor of Angeles City
- Alex Cauguiran - former member of the Angeles City Council
- Edgardo Pamintuan Sr. - former mayor of Angeles City
- Amos Rivera - Vice Mayor of Angeles City since 2025
- Janet Lazatin - President of the City College of Angeles since 2026
