= Janet Lazatin =

President of the City College of Angeles

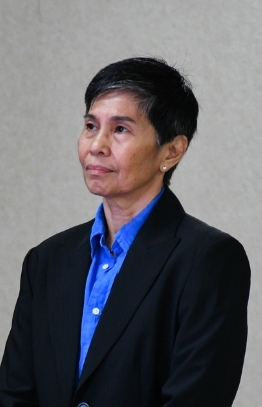
- Lazatin in 2026

4th President of the City College of Angeles and Vice President for Administration
- Incumbent
- Assumed office June 1, 2026
- Chairman: Carmelo Lazatin II
- Preceded by: Janneth Sarmiento

Assistant Secretary of Tourism
- In office 2009–2010
- President: Gloria Macapagal-Arroyo; Benigno Aquino III

Personal details
- Born: Janet Rita Bautista Lazatin; August 1, 1966 (age 60) Angeles City, Philippines
- Party: Lakas (2009–2010)
- Relations: Carmelo Lazatin II (brother); Carmelo Lazatin Jr. (half-brother)
- Parent: Carmelo Lazatin Sr. (father)
- Relatives: Lazatin family
- Education: Holy Angel University (DBM)
- Occupation: Academic administrator, business executive

Janet Rita Bautista Lazatin (Tagalog: [dʒænɪt ˈriːtə baʊˈtɪstə lɑːˈzɑːtɪn]; born August 1, 1966), is a Filipino academic administrator, business executive and licensed real estate broker who has served as the 4th President of the City College of Angeles (CCA) since June 1, 2026, succeeding OIC President Janneth Sarmiento.

Prior to her appointment as CCA President, Lazatin held various positions in the Philippine national government, including Assistant Secretary of the Department of Tourism (DOT) and Director III of the Department of Social Welfare and Development (DSWD).

== Early life and education ==
Lazatin was born on August 1, 1966, into the prominent Lazatin family of Angeles City, Pampanga. She is the daughter of Carmelo “Tarzan” Lazatin Sr., former Mayor of Angeles City and former Representative of Pampanga’s 1st district, and Ofelia Galang Bautista.

She is the sister of incumbent Angeles City Mayor Carmelo “Jon” Bautista Lazatin II, and the half-sister of Pampanga 1st district Representative Carmelo “Pogi” Lazatin Jr. She is also the sibling of Leia, Ma. Theresa, Claudelle, Pamela, Sharon, and Camille, all of which are children of Carmelo Lazatin Sr.

Lazatin earned a Doctor of Business Management degree from Holy Angel University. She also completed graduate studies in Public Management and Government Management. In March 2014, she passed the Professional Regulation Commission (PRC) Licensure Examination for Real Estate Brokers, becoming a licensed real estate broker.

== Career ==
=== Government service ===
Lazatin served as Assistant Secretary of the Department of Tourism (DOT) from 2009 to 2010, under Tourism Secretaries Ace Durano and Alberto Lim, during the administrations of Presidents Gloria Macapagal Arroyo and Benigno Aquino III. During her tenure, she was involved in initiatives promoting domestic tourism in response to the global economic downturn associated with the 2009 financial crisis.

She also served as Director III of the Department of Social Welfare and Development (DSWD) and held a position within the Department of Science and Technology (DOST). Additionally, she served as a Technical Advisor for the Local Government of Angeles City.

=== Business career ===
Outside of government service, Lazatin served as President of the Amalgamated Builders and Contractors Corporation, a construction and development firm based in Angeles City, Pampanga. She also served as a Board Member of Frontier Capital Group Ltd., a publicly listed multinational company.

=== 2010 party-list nomination ===
In the 2010 Philippine House of Representatives party-list elections, Lazatin was nominated by the Pilipino Association for Country–Urban Poor Youth Advancement and Welfare (PACYAW) as one of its party-list nominees under the Bagong Alyansang Makabayan (BAYAN) coalition. The PACYAW party-list obtained 143,553 votes but failed to secure a seat in the House of Representatives.

== Presidency of the City College of Angeles ==
On June 1, 2026, Lazatin assumed office as the 4th President of the City College of Angeles (CCA), a local government-funded higher education institution in Angeles City, Pampanga. Her appointment followed her selection as the lone presidential candidate during a public forum conducted by the institution.

She succeeded Janneth Sarmiento, who served as Officer-in-Charge President prior to her appointment. Her appointment marked the beginning of a new administrative leadership focused on institutional development, academic strengthening, and community engagement within the college.
