= Maricel Morales =

Filipino actress, beauty queen and politician

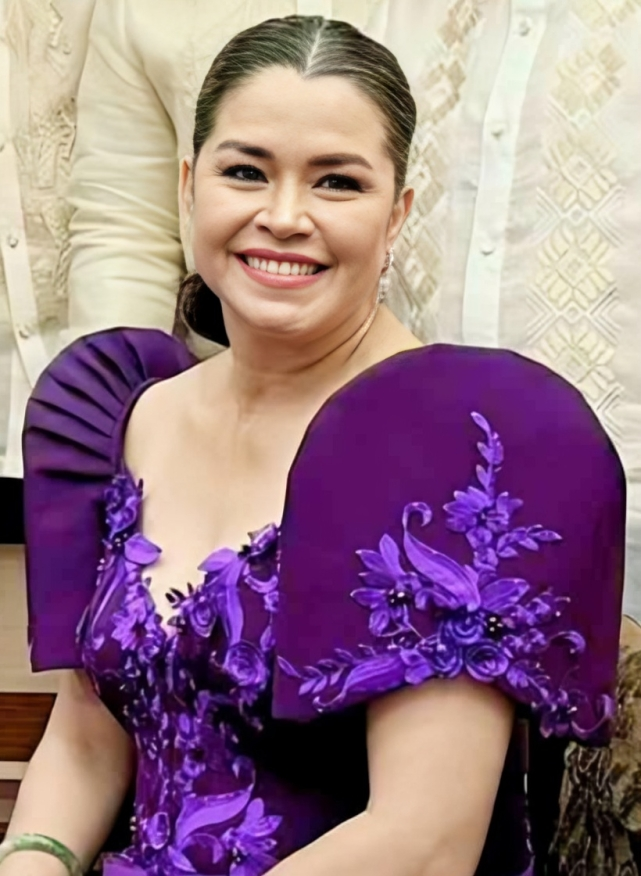
- Morales during the 20th City Council

Member of Angeles City Council
- Incumbent
- Assumed office June 30, 2025
- In office June 30, 2007 – June 30, 2016

Personal details
- Born: Maricel Gomez Morales; March 5, 1976 (age 50) Angeles City, Philippines
- Party: Independent (2024–present)
- Other political affiliations: KAMBILAN (2018–2024); PAK/ABE (2012–2018); Lakas (2008–2012); KAMPI (2007–2008)
- Relations: Marino "Boking" Morales (Uncle) (Mayor of Mabalacat City; 1995–2013)
- Education: Angeles University Foundation
- Occupation: Actress; singer (Note: She competed on It's Showtime Tawag ng Tanghalan – Celebrity Champions in 2019.); beauty queen; politician
- Known for: MNP – Asia Pacific 1995 (Winner); Miss Asia-Pacific 1995 (Top 12 Semi-finalist); Mrs. World 2001 (1st Runner-up)
- Website: boommmarang
- Nickname: Marang

Maricel "Marang" Morales-Agoncillo (Tagalog: [maɾiˈsɛl moˈɾales aɡonˈsilo]; born March 5, 1976), is a Filipino actress, beauty queen and politician, who has served as a member of the Angeles City Council since 2025, after winning in the 2025 local elections, securing another term as councilor, after a six years hiatus.

== Career ==
=== Beauty Pageant ===
Morales rose to fame in the 1990s as a beauty queen and actress. She was crowned Mutya ng Pilipinas in 1995, representing the Philippines in Miss Asia-Pacific, where she placed among the Top 12 Semi-finalist. In 2001, she represents the country again now in the Mrs. World Pageant, earning the first runner-up title.

=== Entertainment Industry ===
Morales appeared in various films during the 1990s and early 2000s, including Brat Pack (1994), Virgin Island (1997), Tapatan ng Tapang (1997), Talahib at Rosas 2 (1999), D'Sisters: Nuns of the Above (1999), 100 Tula para kay Elisa (2013), Amnesia Love (2018), and Sunny (2024).

=== Political Career (Councilor 2007–2016, 2025–present) ===
Morales transitioned into politics, serving as a councilor in Angeles City. She was first elected to the city council in 2007 and served for three consecutive terms, completing her tenure in 2016. In 2019 Angeles City local elections she runs as Vice Mayor but lost to Vicky Vega.

After six years hiatus from politics, Morales made a political comeback in the 2025 Angeles City local elections. She filed her Certificate of Candidacy for councilor as an independent in October 2024, signaling her intent to re-enter the political arena. During the May 2025 elections, Morales successfully won a seat as a councilor securing 69,853 of total votes, she assumed office on June 30, 2025.

== Filmography ==
=== Film ===
Year	Title	Role
1994	Brat Pack	Sarah
1997	Virgin Island	
1997	Tapatan ng Tapang	Perla
1999	Talahib at Rosas 2	Juliet
1999	D'Sisters: Nuns of the Above	Juliet
2013	100 Tula para kay Elisa	Teacher
2018	Amnesia Love	Aling Mareng
2024	Sunny	

=== Television ===
Year	Title	Role	Notes	Source
1996	Maalaala Mo Kaya	Lou	Episode: "Lubid"	
2010	Trudis Liit	Magdalena "Magda" Basco-Capili		
2005–06	Etheria: Ang Ikalimang Kaharian ng Encantadia	Ora		
2006	Encantadia: Pag-ibig Hanggang Wakas	Ora		
2010–11	Little Star	Ruby		
2012	The Good Daughter	Chesca		
2012	Together Forever	Angelo's mother		
2013	Pyra: Babaeng Apoy	Eleanor Calida		
2014	Dading	Therese Santiago		
2016	Maalaala Mo Kaya	Emelita	Episode: "Silver Medal"	
2016	Maalaala Mo Kaya	Divina	Episode: "Mikropono"	
2018	Dear Uge	Gong's mother	Episode: "Cory Koreano"	
2017	Maalaala Mo Kaya	Maria	Episode: "Traysikel"	
2017	Maalaala Mo Kaya	Jenny	Episode: "Tungkod"	
2018	Maalaala Mo Kaya	Sylvia	Episode: "Surfboarf"	
2018	Maalaala Mo Kaya	Marilou	Episode: "Luneta Park"	
2018	Maynila	Vergie	Episode: "Battered Boyfriend"	
2018	Maalaala Mo Kaya	Lou	Episode: "Paruparo"	
2019	Ipaglaban Mo!	Mylene	Episode: "Alegasyon"	
2019	Pamilya Ko	Corazon Quisumbing		
2019	The Killer Bride	Aurora Bonaobra		
2021	Kagat ng Dilim	Esther	Episode: "Kakambal"	
2021	Encounter	Cynthia Cristobal		
2023—2024	Black Rider	Janina		
2025	I Love You Since 1892	Doña Soledad Montecarlos		

== Electoral history ==
Electoral history of Maricel Morales
Year	Office	Party	Votes received				Result
Year	Office	Party	Total	%	P.	Swing	Result
2007	Councilor of Angeles City	KAMPI	48,343	—N/a	3rd	—N/a	Won
2010	Councilor of Angeles City	Lakas–Kampi	47,886	—N/a	2nd	—N/a	Won
2013	Councilor of Angeles City	PAK/ABE	57,932	53.35%	5th	—N/a	Won
2025	Councilor of Angeles City	Independent	69,853	41.72%	4th	—N/a	Won
2019	Vice Mayor of Angeles City	KAMBILAN	26,903	20.55%	3rd	—N/a	Lost
