= 2010 Angeles City local elections =

Philippine elections

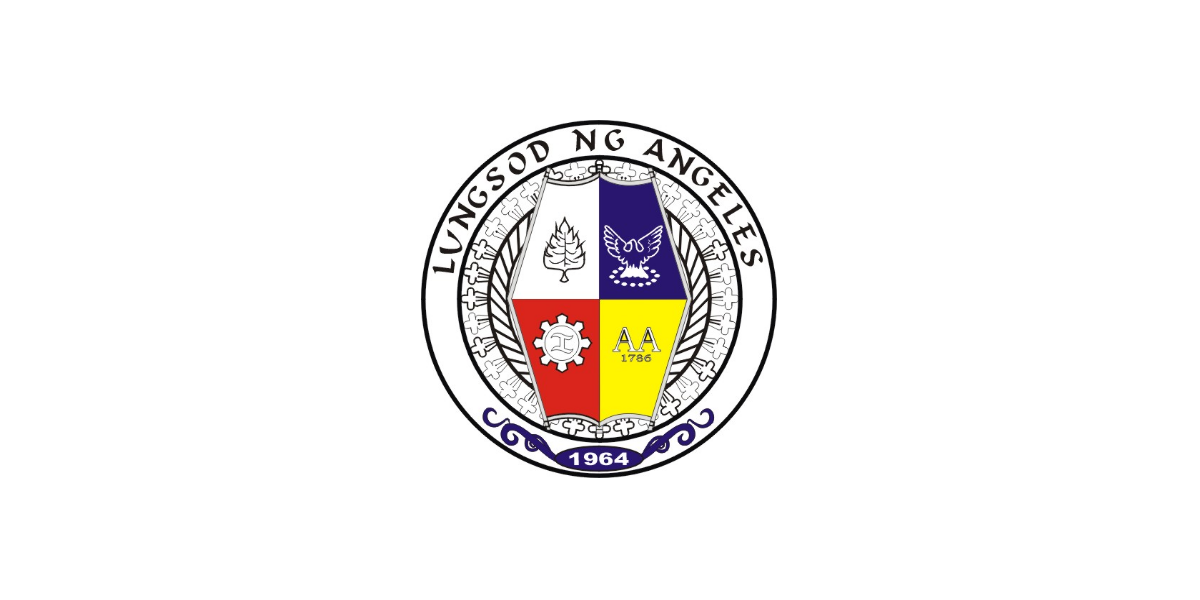
- May 10, 2010
- Mayoral election

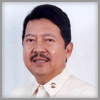

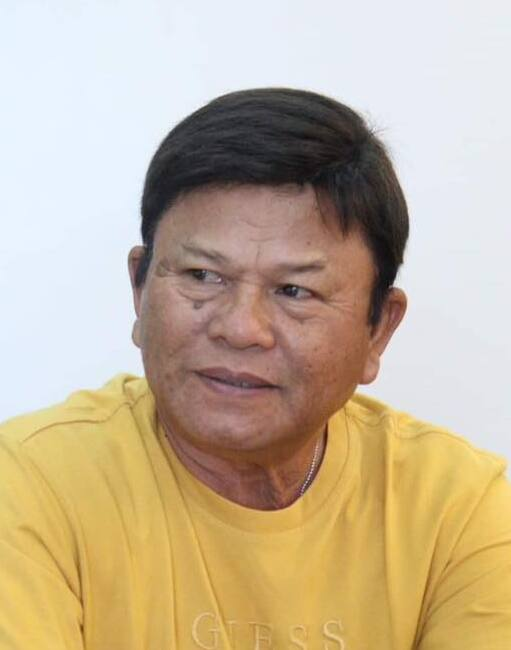
Candidate	Edgardo Pamintuan Sr.	Francis Nepomuceno	Rodelio Mamac Sr.
Party	Lakas–Kampi	NPC	Liberal
Alliance	Team Agyu Tamu	Team Friendship	Team Mamac
Running mate	Maria Vicenta Vega-Cabigting	Ricardo Zalamea	Cris Cadiang
Popular vote	60,562	34,105	13,875
Percentage	55.80	31.42	12.78
Mayor before election
Francis Nepomuceno
NPC
Elected mayor
Edgardo Pamintuan Sr.
Lakas–Kampi
- Vice mayoral election
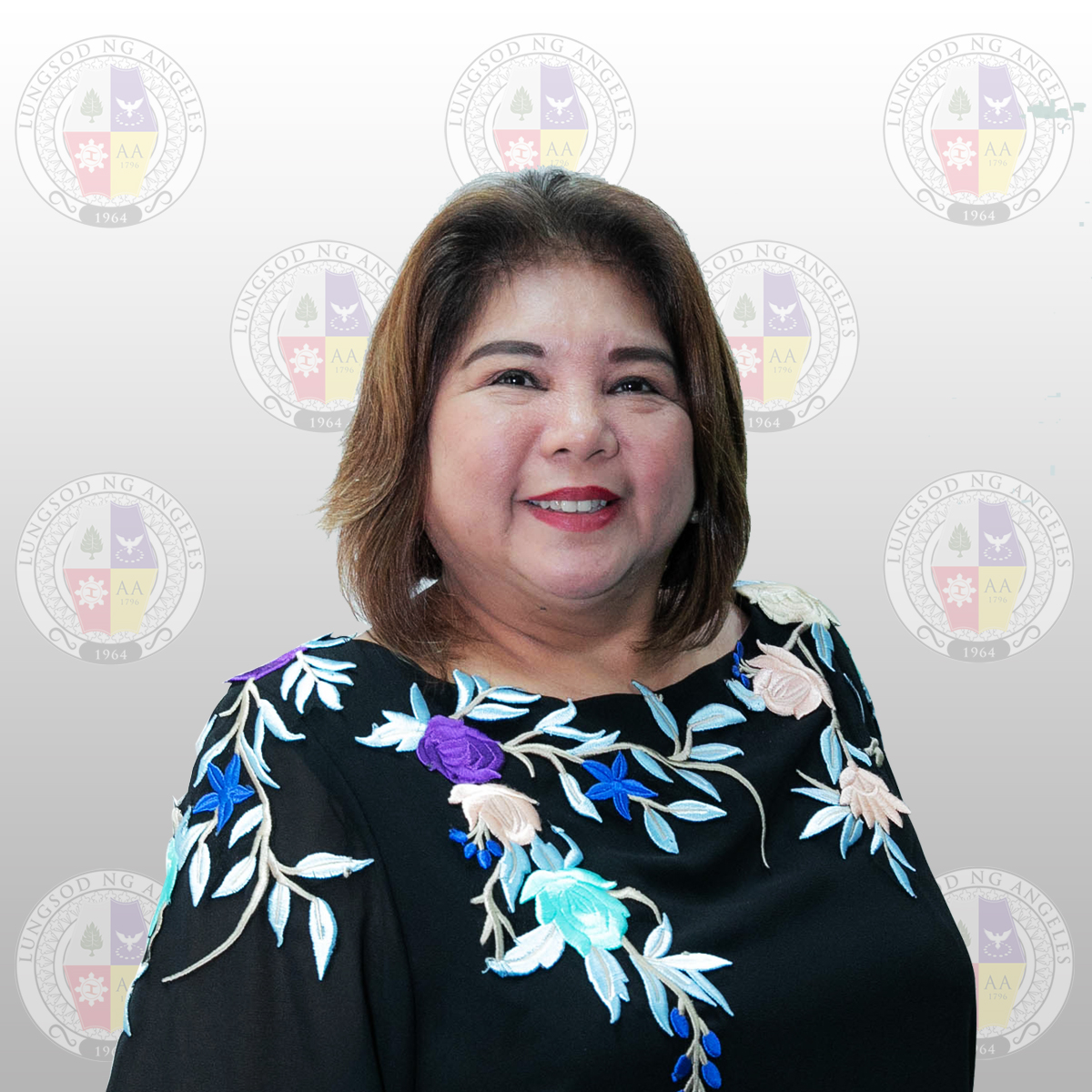

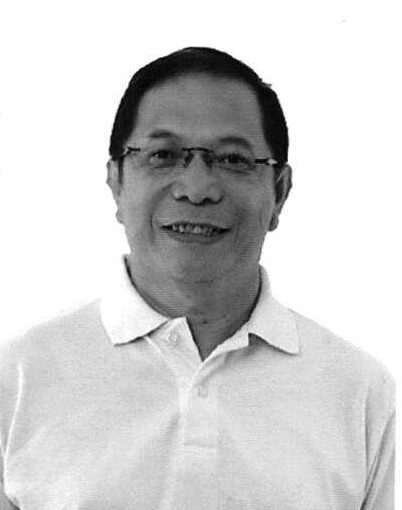
		NPC
Candidate	Vicky Vega	Ricardo Zalamea	Cris Cadiang
Party	Lakas–Kampi	NPC	Liberal
Alliance	Team Agyu Tamu	Team Friendship	Team Mamac
Popular vote	61,289	31,018	10,659
Percentage	59.52	30.12	10.35
Vice Mayor before election
Vicky Vega
Lakas–Kampi
Elected Vice Mayor
Vicky Vega
Lakas–Kampi

Local elections were held in the city of Angeles on May 10, 2010. Registered voters of the city will be electing candidates for the following elective local posts: city mayor, city vice mayor, and ten councilors.

As Angeles City is a highly urbanized city, its voters do note vote for Pampanga elective officials; however, they participate in electing the province's first district representative. That district also includes the city of Mabalacat and the municipality of Magalang, all component local government units of the province.

== Results ==
The candidates for mayor and vice mayor with the highest number of votes win their respective seats. They are elected separately; therefore, they may be of different parties when elected.

=== Mayor ===
Former Mayor and Presidential Adviser for External Affairs Edgardo Pamintuan Sr. won the elections. His two opponents are re-electionist Mayor Francis Nepomuceno and Balibago Captain Rodelio Mamac Sr.

Angeles City Mayoral Election
Party	Candidate	Votes	%
Lakas–Kampi	Edgardo Pamintuan Sr.	60,562	55.80
NPC	Francis Nepomuceno	34,105	31.42
Liberal	Rodelio Mamac Sr.	13,875	12.78
Valid ballots		108,542	96.81
Invalid or blank votes		3,578	3.19
Total votes		112,120	100.00
Lakas–Kampi gain from NPC			

=== Vice Mayor ===
Maria Vicenta Vega-Cabigting is the incumbent. Her two opponents are former Vice Mayor Ricardo Zalamea and Crispin Cadiang.

Angeles City Vice Mayoral Election
Party	Candidate	Votes	%
Lakas–Kampi	Maria Vicenta Vega-Cabigting	61,289	59.52
NPC	Ricardo Zalamea	31,018	30.12
Liberal	Crispin Cadiang	10,659	10.35
Valid ballots		102,966	91.84
Invalid or blank votes		9,154	8.16
Total votes		112,120	100.00
Lakas–Kampi hold			

== City Councilors ==
Voting is via plurality-at-large voting: Voters will vote for ten (10) candidates and the ten candidates with the highest number of votes are elected.

=== Results ===
Angeles City Council Election
Party	Candidate	Votes	%
NPC	Jericho Aguas	55,298	
Lakas–Kampi	Maricel Morales	47,886	
NPC	Arvin Suller	46,243	
Lakas–Kampi	Alexander Indiongco	45,824	
NPC	Bryan Matthew Nepomuceno	45,094	
Lakas–Kampi	Willie Rivera	42,527	
Lakas–Kampi	Jay Sangil	41,801	
NPC	Joseph Alfie Bonifacio	41,770	
NPC	Danilo Lacson	40,403	
Lakas–Kampi	Edu Pamintuan	40,117	
Lakas–Kampi	Angelo Justin I Lopez III	38,563	
Lakas–Kampi	Efren dela Cruz	33,171	
Lakas–Kampi	Ruben Maniago	32,784	
NPC	Rafael del Rosario Jr.	31,706	
NPC	Rodolfo Simeon	27,265	
Lakas–Kampi	Jeremias Alejandrino	26,324	
Lakas–Kampi	Reynaldo Gueco	25,149	
Liberal	Rodel Abrea	21,234	
Liberal	Valentino Lagman	20,387	
NPC	Rico Dizon	18,376	
NPC	Abelardo Pamintuan Jr.	17,539	
Independent	Arnel Panganiban	15,849	
Liberal	Ma. Luisa Bañola	15,454	
NPC	Bernardino de Guzman	13,533	
Liberal	Paulo Bucud	11,479	
Liberal	Lilia Pineda	10,823	
Liberal	Robert Yeen	10,790	
Liberal	Mario Cruz	5,801	
Liberal	Andres Tan	5,731	
Independent	Romeo Tolentino	5,278	
Nacionalista	Lener Biag	4,800	
Independent	Alex Nunag	4,683	
Independent	Dave Tecson	2,409	
Total votes			
