= Carmelo Lazatin II =

Mayor of Angeles City (born 1970)

- Official portrait, 2026

35th Mayor of Angeles City
- Incumbent
- Assumed office June 30, 2025
- Vice Mayor: Amos Rivera
- Preceded by: Carmelo Lazatin Jr.

Member of the House of Representatives from Pampanga's 1st district
- In office June 30, 2016 – June 30, 2025
- Preceded by: Joseller M. Guiao
- Succeeded by: Carmelo Lazatin Jr.

Member of Angeles City Council
- In office June 30, 1995 – June 30, 1998

Personal details
- Born: June 4, 1970 (age 56) Manila, Philippines
- Party: Lakas (1995–1998; 2023–present); KAMBILAN (local party; 2021–present)
- Other political affiliations: PDP–Laban (2016–2023); Lingap Lugud (2015–2018)
- Spouse: Grace Salamat (separated)
- Relations: Carmelo Lazatin Jr. (half-brother); Janet Lazatin (sister)
- Children: 3
- Relatives: Lazatin family
- Education: Ateneo de Manila University; Angeles University Foundation; Republic Central Colleges
- Occupation: Politician, businessman

Carmelo Bautista Lazatin II (Tagalog: [karˈmɛlo bɔwˈtista laˈzatɪn]; born June 4, 1970), also known as Jon Lazatin, is a Filipino politician and businessman currently serving as the 35th mayor of Angeles City since 2025, having previously served as representative for Pampanga's first district from 2016 to 2025.

== Family background ==
Jon, a member of the well-known Lazatin family in Angeles City, was born on June 4, 1970, in Manila to Carmelo "Tarzan" Lazatin Sr., a former Mayor of Angeles City and Representative of the 1st District of Pampanga, and Ofelia Galang Bautista. His older half-brother, Carmelo "Pogi" Lazatin Jr., currently serves as the Representative of the first district, a position Jon formerly held, while his sister, Janet Lazatin, is the College President of the city’s main higher education institution, the City College of Angeles.

== Political career ==
=== Congressman (2016–2025) ===
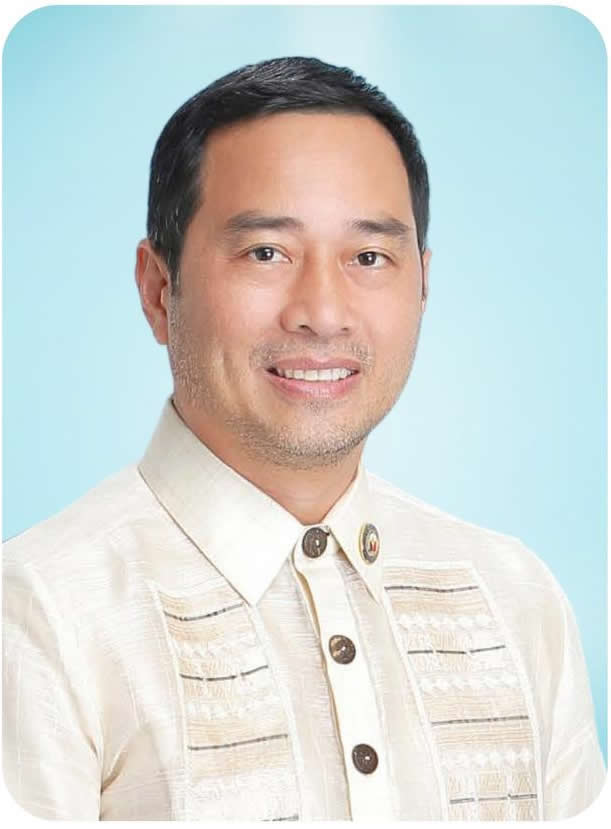
Lazatin during the 19th Congress

Jon was first elected in 2016 as the representative for Pampanga's first district. He successfully secured re-election in both 2019 and 2022, running unopposed in these subsequent elections.

In November 2023, Lazatin left PDP-Laban to join the Lakas–CMD party. On February 5, 2025, Lazatin was among the 95 Lakas–CMD members who voted to impeach vice president Sara Duterte.

=== 2025 Angeles mayoral campaign ===
Lazatin concluded his third consecutive term as congressman, on June 30, 2025, reaching the term limit for this position.

On October 4, 2024, Lazatin officially filed his candidacy for the mayoralty of Angeles City under the Lakas–CMD party before the Commission on Elections (COMELEC), Switching roles with his older half-brother, Carmelo Lazatin Jr., who won the seat as Representative of Pampanga's first district unopposed.

During the 2025 midterm elections, Lazatin was elected as mayor of Angeles City, securing 98,164 total votes. However, his running mate, Vicky Vega, lost the vice mayoral race to Amos Rivera, the running mate of Oscar Albayalde, who received 79,866 votes.

=== Mayor of Angeles City (2025–present) ===
Lazatin inaugural address in 2025

On June 30, 2025, Lazatin became mayor of Angeles City after he succeeded his half-brother Carmelo Jr. Lazatin took an oath as 35th mayor on July 1, 2025.

== Electoral history ==
Electoral history of Carmelo Lazatin II
Year	Office	Party		Votes received				Result
Year	Office	Local	National	Total	%	P.	Swing	Result
2016	Representative (Pampanga–1st)	Lingap Lugud	—N/a	127,762	—N/a	1st	—N/a	Won
2019	Representative (Pampanga–1st)	—N/a	PDP–Laban	152,169	—N/a	1st	—N/a	Won
2022	Representative (Pampanga–1st)	KAMBILAN	PDP–Laban	245,672	100.00%	1st	—N/a	Unopposed
2025	Mayor of Angeles City	KAMBILAN	Lakas	98,164	62.47%	1st	—N/a	Won

Political offices
Preceded by Carmelo Lazatin Jr.	Mayor of Angeles City; 2025–present	Incumbent
House of Representatives of the Philippines
Preceded by Yeng Guiao	Representative for Pampanga's 1st district 2016–2025	Succeeded by Carmelo Lazatin Jr.
