= Lazatin House =

Heritage house in Pampanga, Philippines

Coordinates: 15°01′32″N 120°41′26″E

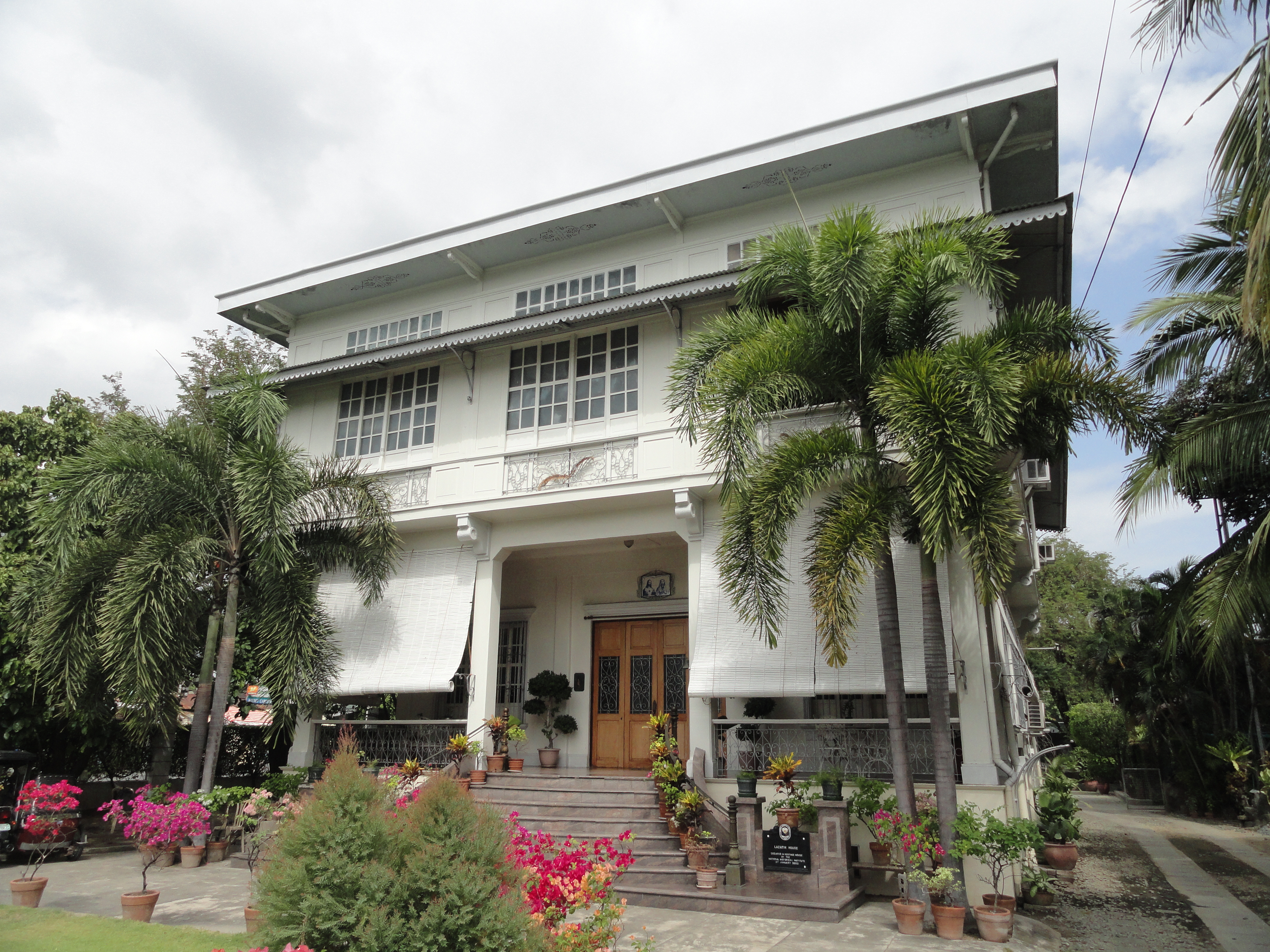
Façade of the Lazatin House

The Lazatin House is one of the two heritage houses owned by the Lazatin family in the City of San Fernando, Pampanga province in the Philippines.

== History ==
The house was built in 1925 by the couple Serafin Lazatin y Ocampo, president of the San Fernando Electric Light & Power Company (SFELAPCO), and Encarnacion Singian y Torres. During the Second World War, it was appropriated by the Japanese Imperial Army to serve as a residence of its 14th Army Commander, General Masaharu Homma, in San Fernando, Pampanga. Once the war ended, its owners returned to their house with majority of the furnitures destroyed. They restored most of it to its former glory passing the house down to their descendants.

== Heritage House ==
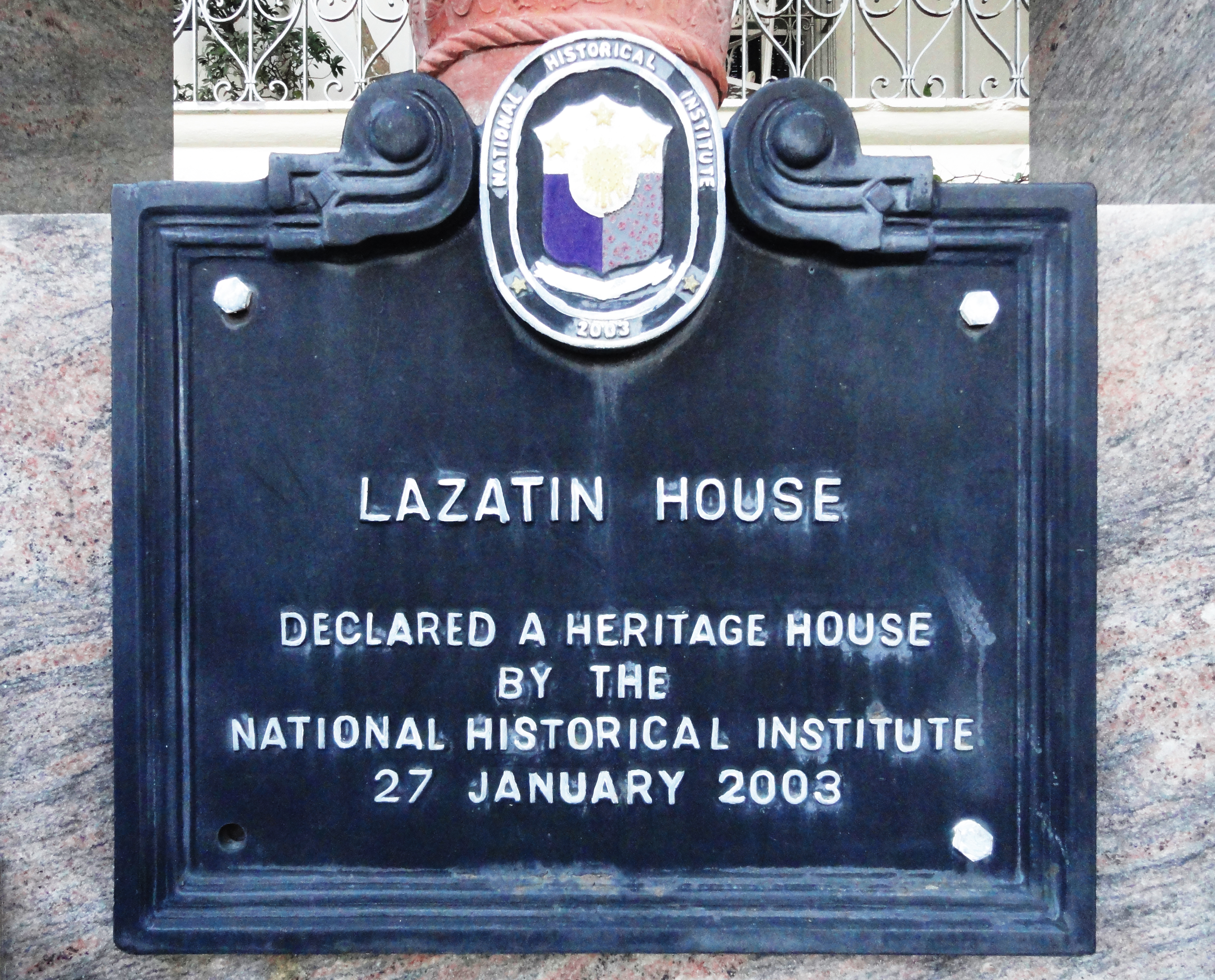
Historical marker installed in 2003 declaring the building as a Heritage House

This ancestral house, which exemplifies the type of Bahay na Bato architecture prevalent during the American colonial period was declared a Heritage House by the National Historical Institute on January 27, 2003, by virtue of Resolution No. 6, S. 2003. Due to its status as a Heritage House, the exterior of the house has not been and may never be changed. Presently, this ancestral house is still owned by the surviving members of the Lazatin family.

== Gallery ==
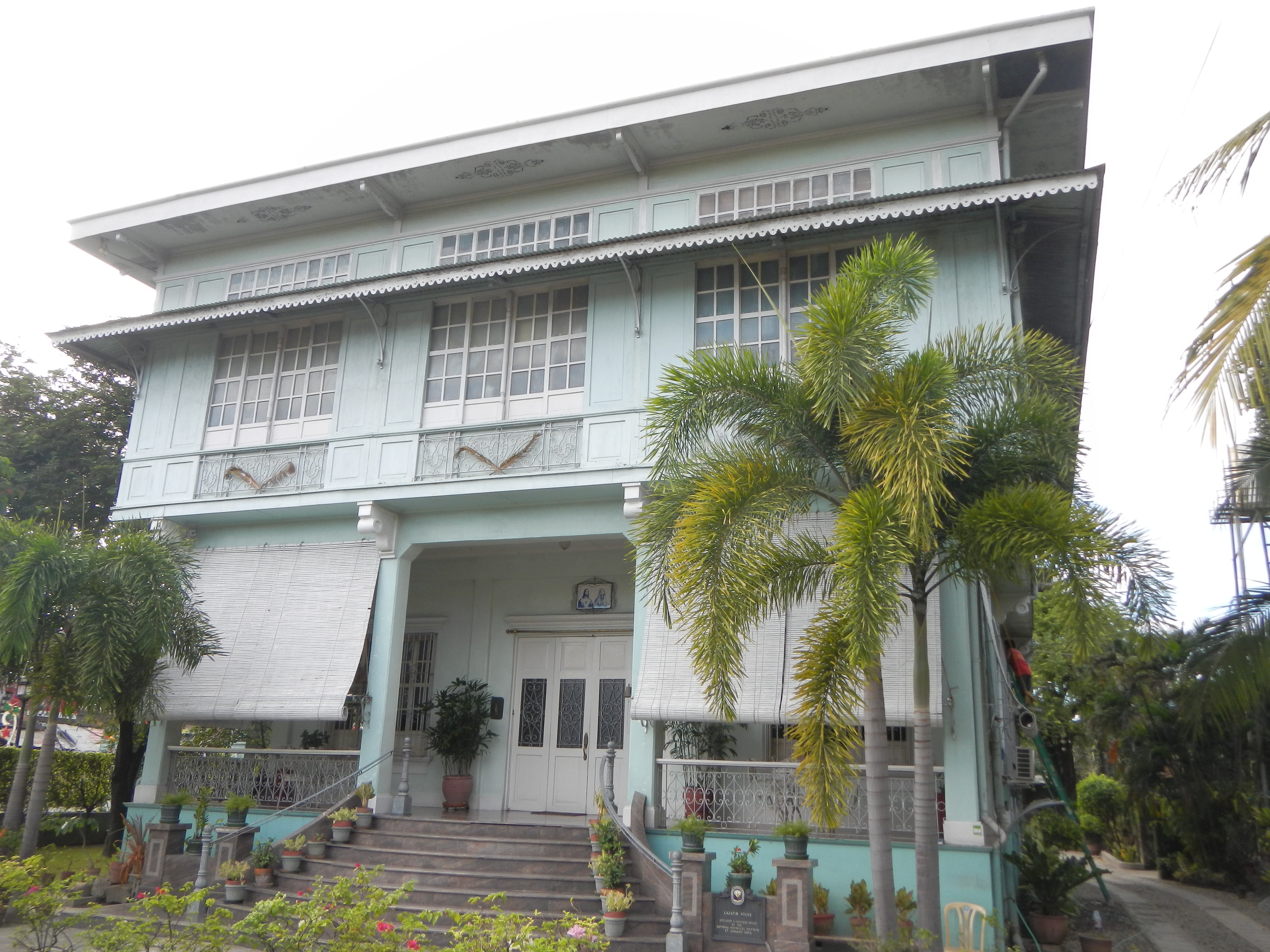
Façade of the Serafin Lazatin y Ocampo heritage house

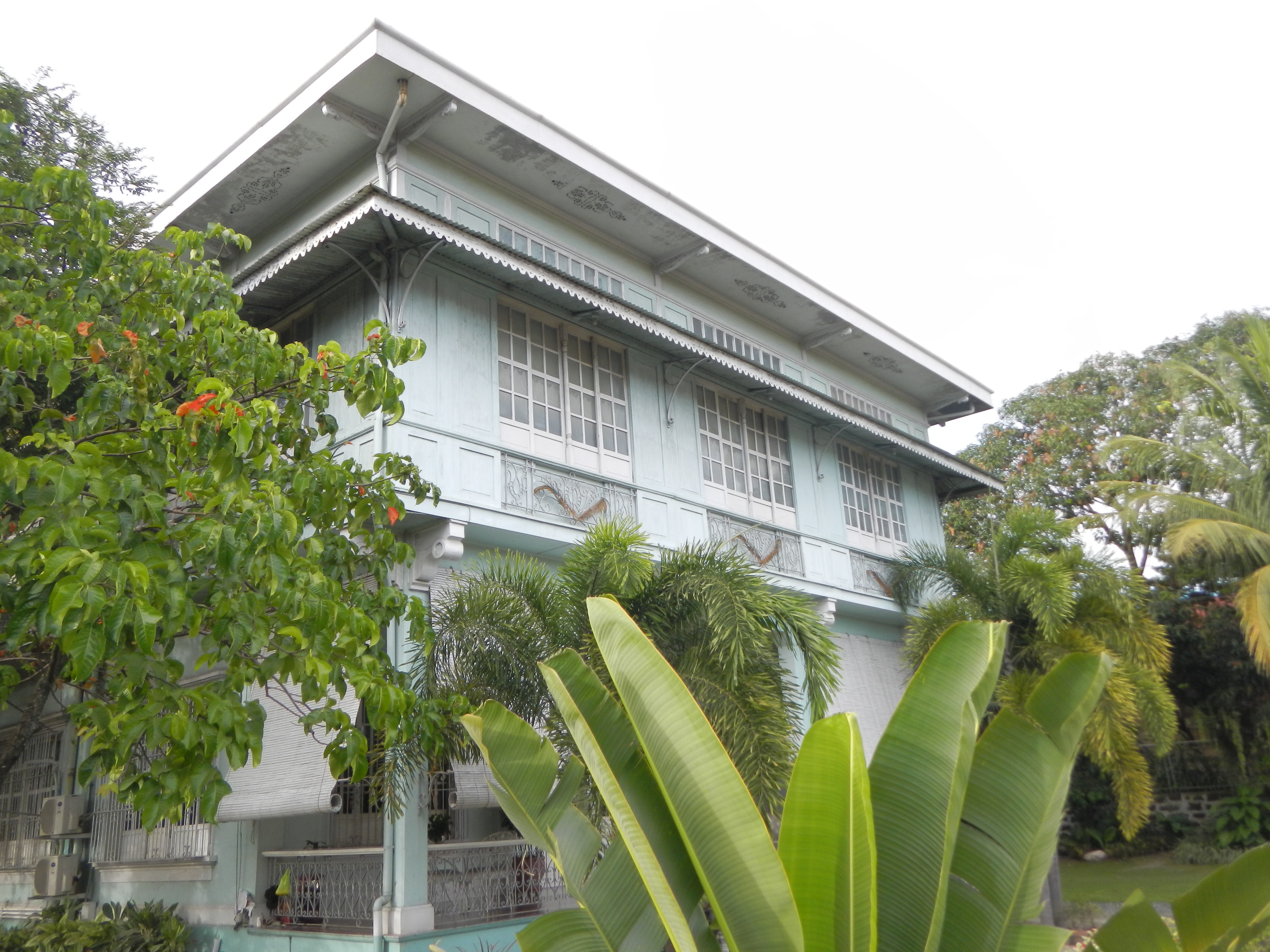
Front and left side of the mansion

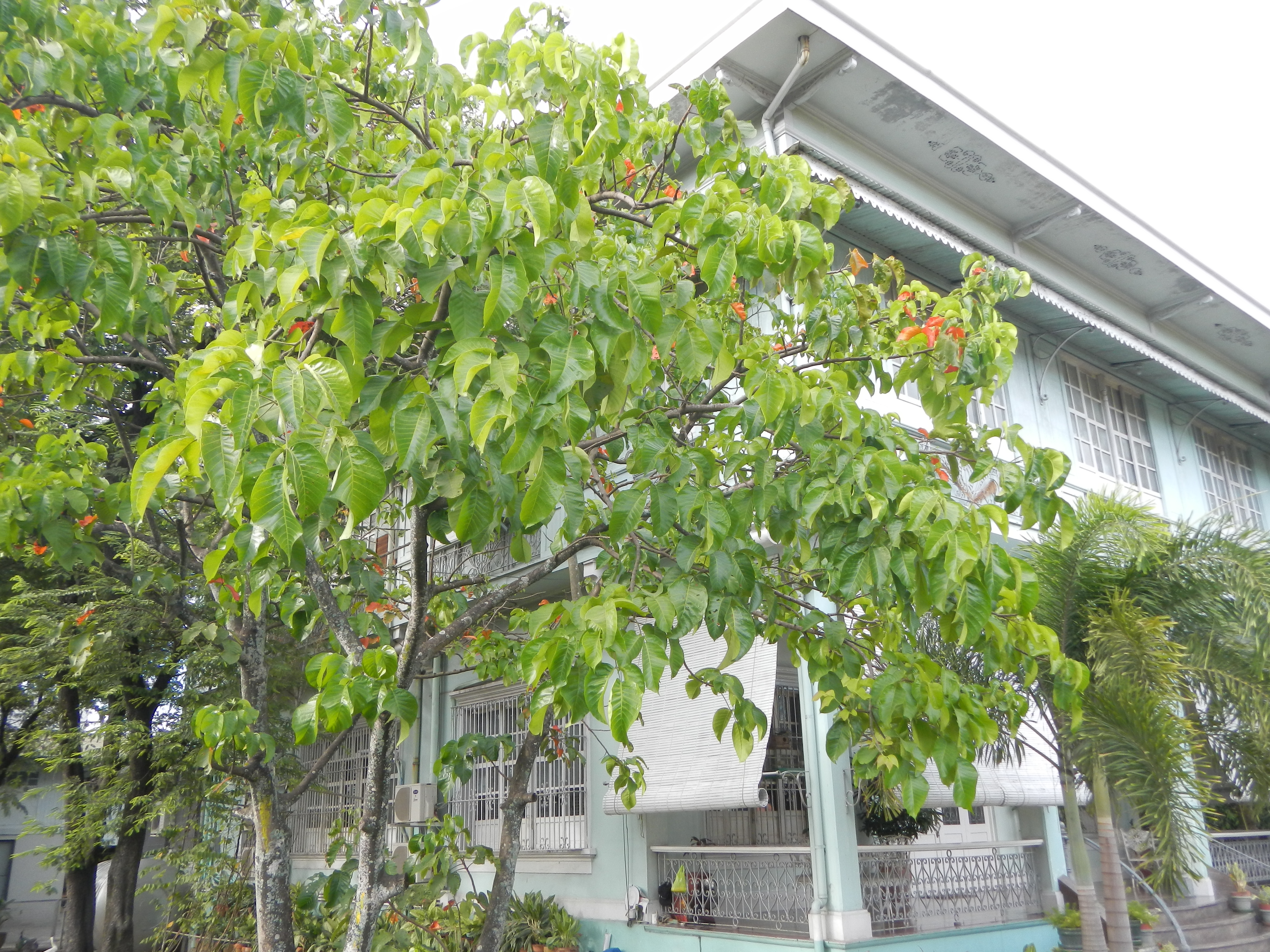
A peep from the fence, the left and center side of the house

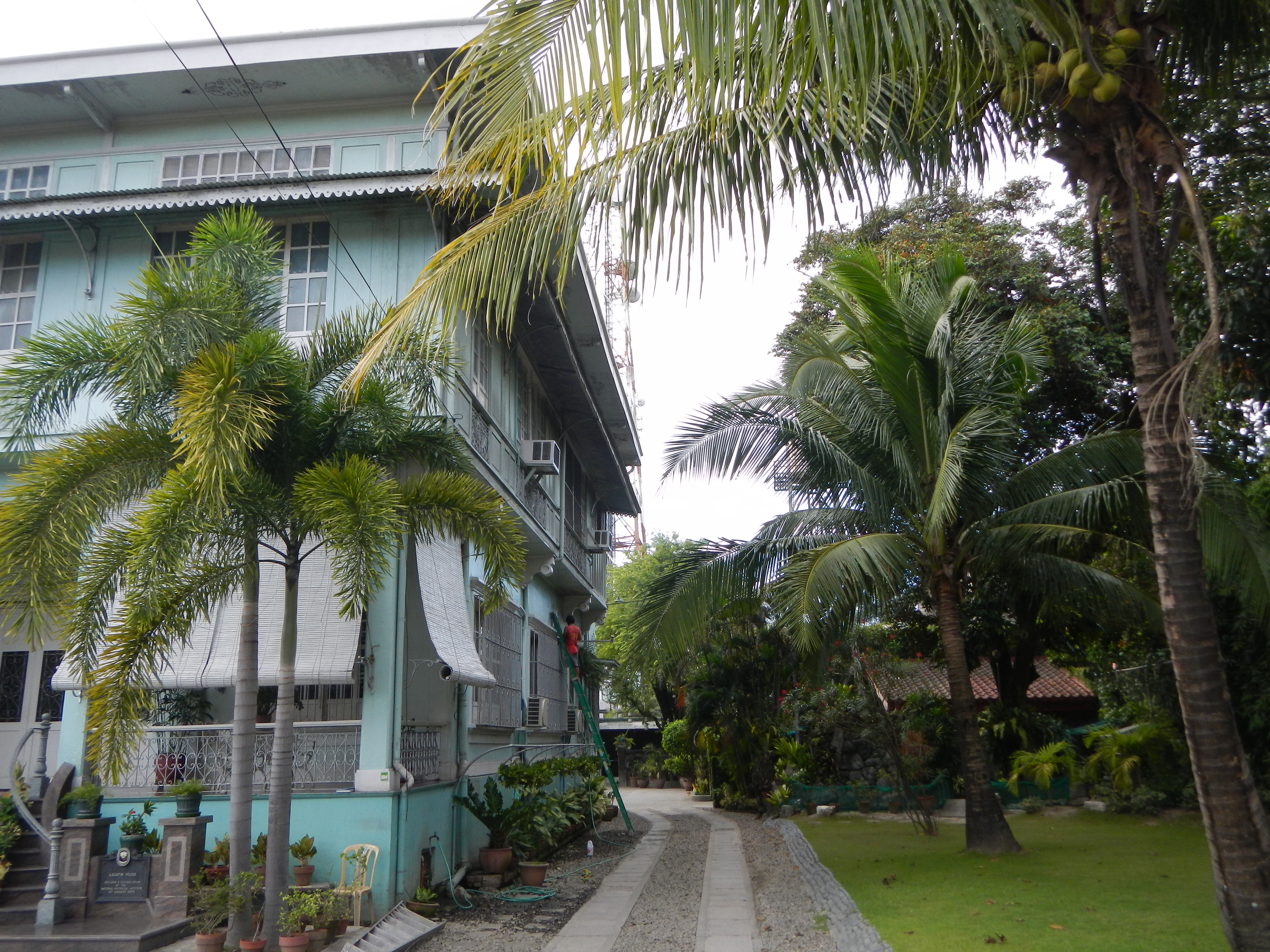
Fence and driveway
