= Republic Central Colleges =

Private non-sectarian college in Angeles City, Philippines

- Former names: Republic Academy (1946-1948); Republic Junior College (1948-1950)
- Motto: The total development of man based on Faith, Science and Virtue
- Type: Private non-sectarian education institution
- Established: 1946; 80 years ago
- Founders: Rafael Lazatin; Victoria Feliciano-Lazatin
- Academic affiliations: PACUCOA
- President: Dr. Victoria F. Lazatin-Angeles
- Location: Plaridel Street, Barangay Lourdes Sur, Angeles City, Pampanga, Philippines
- Nickname: RCC
- Website: www.rcc.edu.ph

Republic Central Colleges often called RCC, is a private non-sectarian school in Angeles City, Philippines. It offers primary, secondary, and tertiary education. The school was founded by Rafael Lazatin and Victoria Feliciano-Lazatin.

== History ==
In June 1946, the school was established as Republic Academy. It was initially rented as a residential building located at Plaridel Street in then-municipality of Angeles, Pampanga.

== Academic departments ==
- College of Arts, Sciences and Education
- College of Computer Studies
- College of Business and Accountancy
- College of Engineering
- Basic Education Department (Elemantary and High School)

== Notable alumni ==
- Carmelo Lazatin Jr., current representative Pampanga's first district and former mayor of Angeles City
- Carmelo Lazatin II, current mayor of Angeles City and former representative Pampanga's first district
