= 2025 Angeles City local elections =

Philippine elections

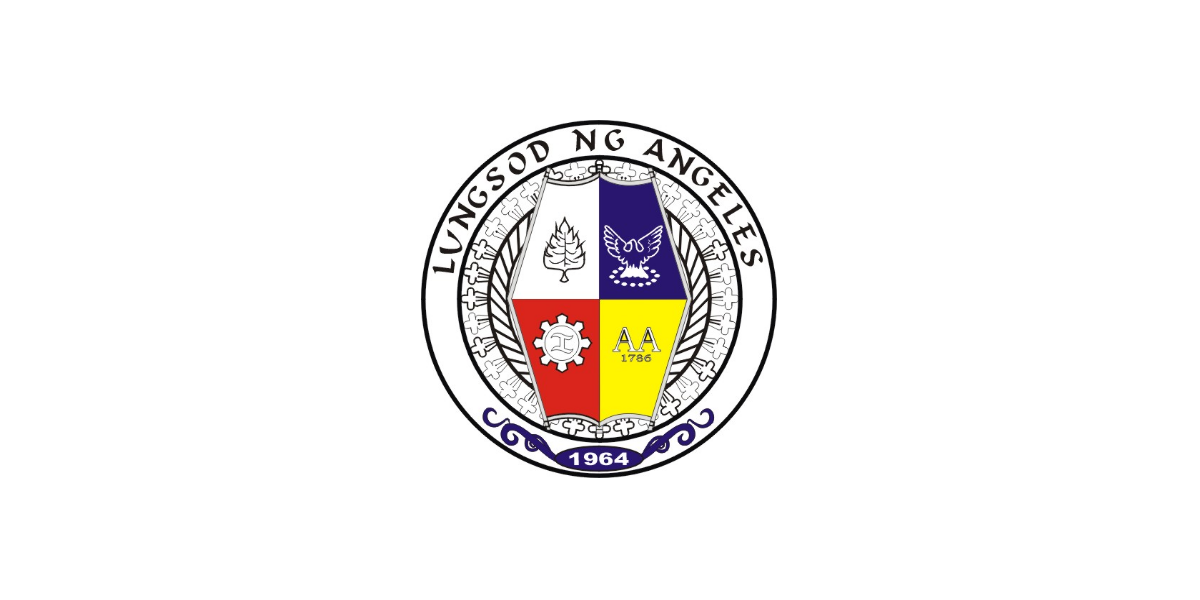
- May 12, 2025
- Mayoral election
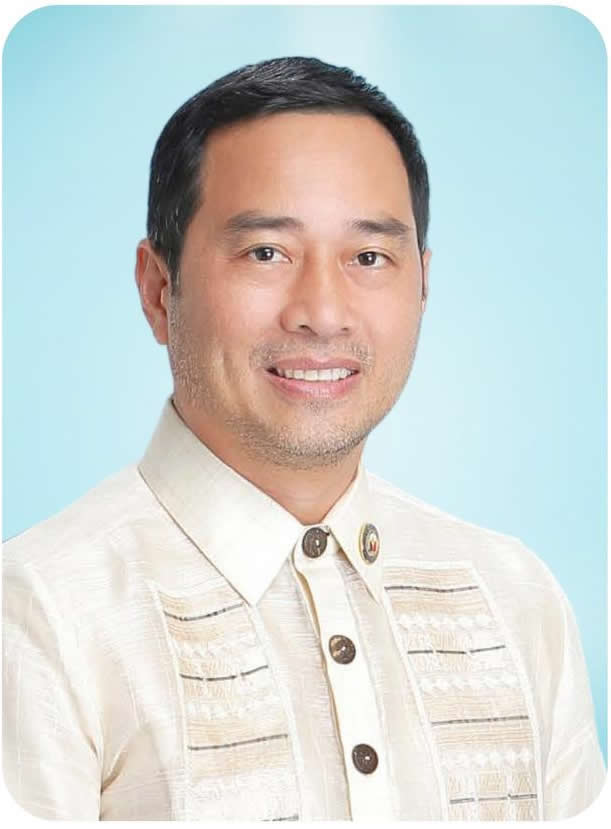

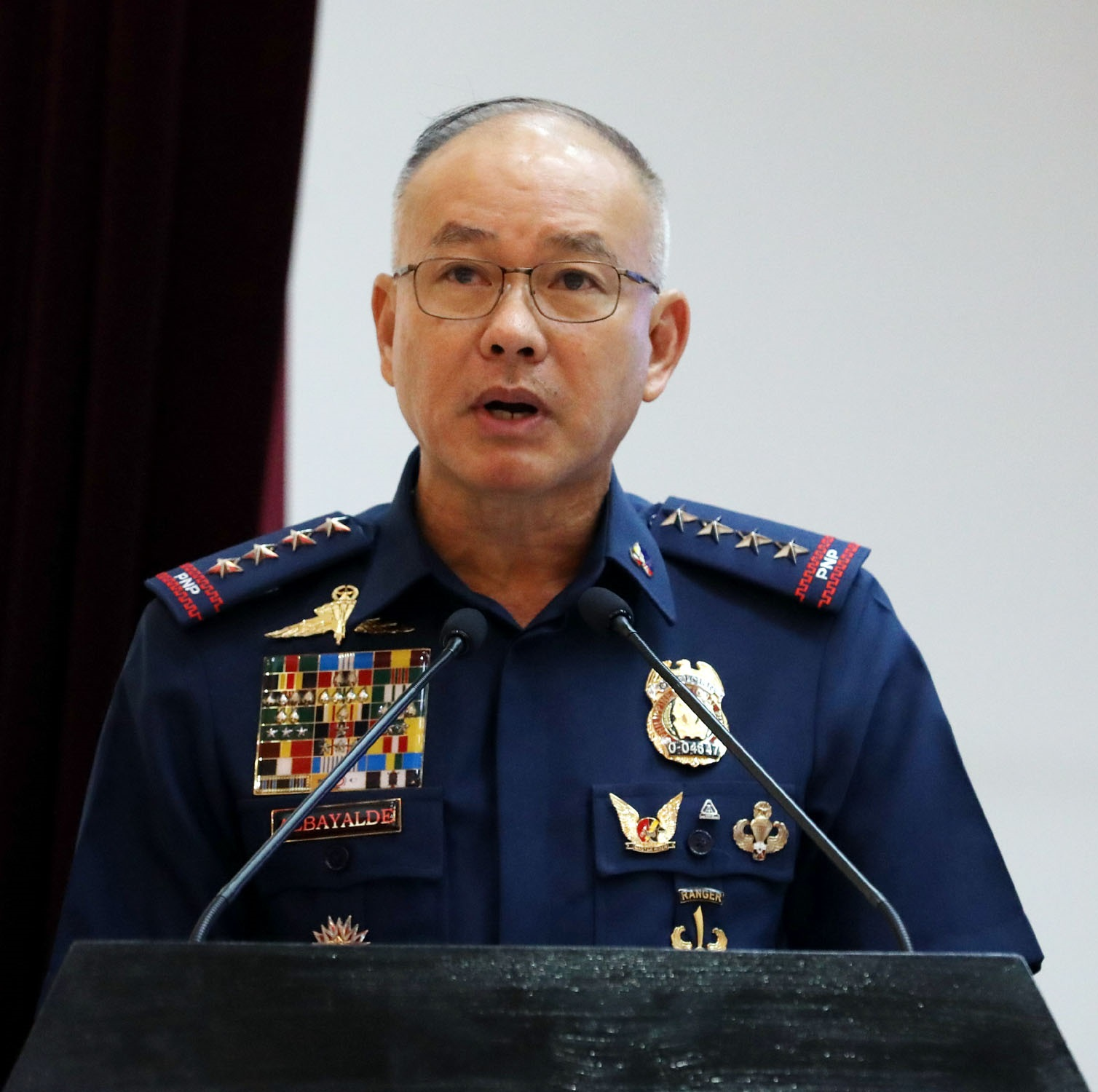
Candidate	Carmelo Lazatin II	Oscar Albayalde
Party	Lakas	PRP
Alliance	Team #JOiNtana	Team #OCAbalen
Running mate	Vicky Vega	Amos Rivera
Popular vote	98,164	58,953
Percentage	62.47%	37.53%
Mayor before election
Carmelo Lazatin Jr.
PFP
Elected mayor
Carmelo Lazatin II
Lakas
- Vice mayoral election
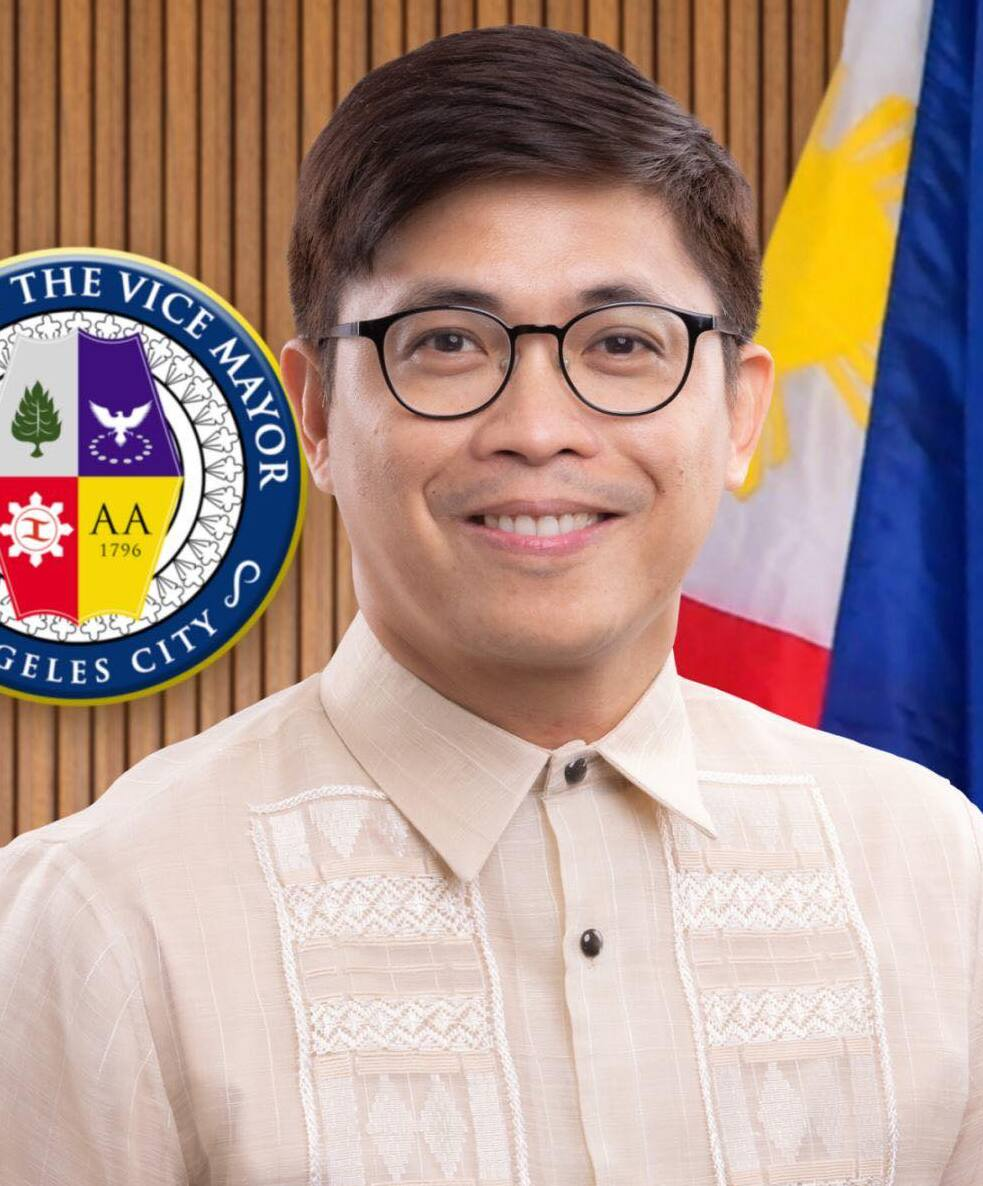

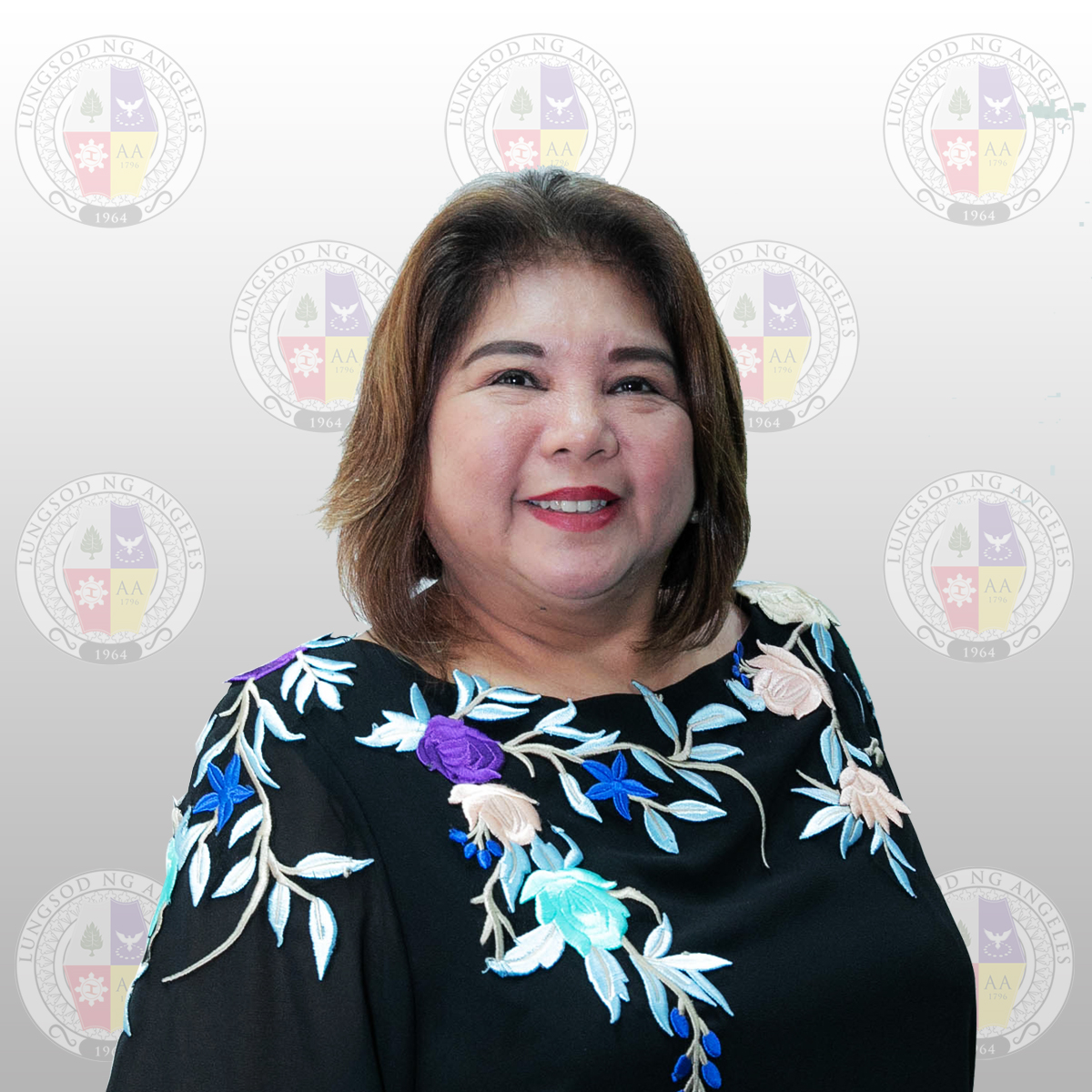
Candidate	Amos Rivera	Vicky Vega
Party	PRP	Lakas
Alliance	Team #OCAbalen	Team #JOiNtana
Popular vote	79,866	72,315
Percentage	52.48%	47.52%
Vice Mayor before election
Vicky Vega
Lakas
Elected Vice Mayor
Amos Rivera
PRP
- City Council election

10 of 12 seats in the Angeles City Council 7 seats needed for a majority
	Majority party	Minority party
Party	Lakas	Independent
Alliance	TeamJOiNtana
Last election	Did not participate	Did not participate
Seats before	7	0
Seats won	8	2
Seat change	▲1	▲2

Local elections were held in Angeles City on May 12, 2025, as part of the 2025 Philippine general election. Angeles City voters will elect a mayor, a vice mayor, and 10 out of 12 councilors of the Angeles City Council.

As of the 2022 general election, the city had 205,822 eligible voters, with the majority casting their votes for the incumbent's half-brother, Carmelo Lazatin II, who was proclaimed mayor-elect on May 13, 2025.

== Mayor ==
Incumbent Carmelo Lazatin Jr. (Partido Federal ng Pilipinas) is running for the House of Representatives in Pampanga's 1st legislative district. Lazatin was re-elected under Kapanalig at Kambilan ning Memalen Pampanga with 70.37% of the vote in 2022.

=== Candidates ===
The following candidates are included in the ballot:

No.	Candidate	Party
1	Oscar Albayalde	People's Reform Party
2	Carmelo Lazatin II	Lakas–CMD

=== Results ===
Angeles City Mayoralty Election
Party	Candidate	Votes	%
Lakas	Carmelo Lazatin II	98,164	62.47%
PRP	Oscar Albayalde	58,953	37.53%
Total votes		157,117	100%
Lakas hold			

== Vice mayor ==
Incumbent Vicky Vega (Lakas–CMD) is running for a third term. Vega was re-elected under Kapanalig at Kambilan Ning Memalen Pampanga with 67.26% of the vote in 2022.

=== Candidates ===
The following candidates are included in the ballot:

No.	Candidate	Party
1	Amos Rivera	People's Reform Party
2	Vicky Vega (incumbent)	Lakas–CMD

=== Results ===
Angeles City Vice Mayoralty Election
Party	Candidate	Votes	%
PRP	Amos Rivera	79,866	52.48%
Lakas	Vicky Vega	72,315	47.52%
Total votes		152,181	100%
PRP gain from Lakas			

== City Council ==
The Angeles City Council is composed of 12 councilors, 10 of whom are elected.

=== Term-limited councilors ===
The following councilors are term-limited:

- Dan Lacson (Kapanalig at Kambilan Ning Memalen Pampanga)
- Jay Sangil (Kapanalig at Kambilan Ning Memalen Pampanga)
- Joseph Alfie Bonifacio (Kapanalig at Kambilan Ning Memalen Pampanga)

=== Overview ===
Party
Lakas–CMD
Nationalist People's Coalition
People's Reform Party
Independent
Total

==== Team #JOiNtana ====
Team #JOiNtana
Name	Party	Result
Pogs Suller	Lakas	Won
JC Parker Aguas	Lakas	Won
Kap Niknok Bañola	Lakas	Won
Edu Pamintuan	Lakas	Won
Ron Pineda	Lakas	Won
Alex Indiongco	Lakas	Won
Doc Mich Bonifacio	Lakas	Won
Raco Del Rosario	Lakas	Won
Alfred Sangil	Lakas	Lost
Kap Cris Cortez	Lakas	Lost

==== Team #OCAbalen ====
Team #OCAbalen
Name	Party	Result
Aljur Abrenica	PRP	Lost
Cris Cadiang	PRP	Lost
Patrick Cura	PRP	Lost
Doc Pie Juan	PRP	Lost
Lab Nacu	PRP	Lost
Don Quito	PRP	Lost
Nong Tamayo	PRP	Lost
Rhoda Timaio	PRP	Lost

==== Independent Candidates ====
Independent (IND)
Name	Party	Result
Maricel Morales	Independent	Won
Atty. Jeselle Dayrit	Independent	Won
Jan Sangil	Independent	Lost
Pangilinan Philip Samson	Independent	Lost
Doc Madlangyan	Independent	Lost
Marvin Tropa	Independent	Lost
Angel Munar	Independent	Lost
Cheng Bangyan	Independent	Lost
Tony Mamac	NPC	Lost

=== Results ===
Angeles City Council Election
Party	Candidate	Votes	%
Lakas	Pogs Suller	91,793	53.78
Lakas	JC Parker Aguas	79,661	46.64
Lakas	Kap Niknok Banola	70,983	42.88
Independent	Marang Morales	69,853	41.72
Lakas	Edu Pamintuan	68,952	40.76
Lakas	Ron Pineda	67,618	39.65
Lakas	Alex Indiongco	65,171	38.83
Lakas	Doc Mich Bonifacio	58,157	34.64
Independent	Jeselle Ann Dayrit	55,142	33.14
Lakas	Raco Paolo Del Rosario	52,497	30.86
Independent	Jan Sangil	51,735	30.07
Lakas	Alfred Sangil	51,604	30.01
Lakas	Chris Cortez	45,597	26.86
PRP	Aljur Abrenica	42,017	25.62
Independent	Philip Samson Pangilinan	37,477	22.87
NPC	Tony Mamac	35,140	21.72
PRP	Doc Pie Juan	34,758	21.18
PRP	Patrick Propesor Cura	30,341	18.45
PRP	Lab Nacu	26,336	15.96
PRP	Don Quito	22,595	13.79
PRP	Cris Amung Cadiang	20,358	12.26
PRP	Rhoda Timaio	18,770	11.36
PRP	Nong Tamayo	14,038	8.53
Independent	Doc Madlangbayan	6,468	3.93
Independent	Marvin Tropa	6,028	3.68
Independent	Angel Munar	4,827	2.96
Independent	Cheng Bangayan	4,610	2.80
Total votes		170,912	100.00%
