= Nominees in the 2010 Philippine House of Representatives party-list election =

The following are the nominees in the 2010 Philippine House of Representatives party-list election.

The list of party-list nominees was published on April 5, 2010.

The elected party-lists and their nominees are in bold.

== Nominees ==
1. **Una Ang Pamilya Formerly Alliance of Neo-Conservatives (1 Ang Pamilya Formerly ANC)**
  1. **Reena Concepcion Obillo**
  2. Protasio Asadon Jr.
  3. Alex Billedo
  4. Virgilio Rosete
  5. David Ramos
2. 1-AANI
  1. Timm Renomeron
  2. Marvyn Gaerlan
  3. Eddie Catalo
  4. Antonio Miranda
  5. Angel Gatmaitan
3. 1-Ako Babaeng Astig Aasenso (1-ABAA)
  1. Margie Tajon
  2. Jocelyn Andres
  3. Shenna Gonzalvo
  4. Lucena Calamayan
  5. Gloria Tabbada
4. One Advocacy for Health, Progress and Opportunity (1-AHAPO)
  1. Magleo Adriano
  2. Jimmy de Castro
  3. Eligio Malaluan
  4. Ramon Reyes
  5. Anna Ma. Andrea Cualing
5. 1-Aangat Ka Pilipino (1-AK)
  1. Eduardo Morales
  2. Melchor Plaza
  3. Henry Asistin
  4. Federico Reyes
  5. Diosdado Alvarado
6. **1st Consumers Alliance for Rural Energy (1-CARE)**
  1. **Michael Angelo Rivera**
  2. **Salvador Cabaluna III**
  3. Jesus Castro
  4. Resurreccion Coronel
  5. Concordio Quisaot
  6. Edgardo Masongsong
7. One Nation Empowered by Technology (1-NET)
8. Alliance of Associations of Accredited Workers in the Water Sector (1-TUBIG (Formerly AAWAS)
  1. Ranulfo Feliciano
  2. Lope Santos III
  3. Emmanuel de Leon
  4. Ranulfo Verian
  5. Ronald Nocum
9. **1-United Transport Koalisyon (1-UTAK)**
  1. Angelo Reyes
  2. Vigor Maria Mendoza (incumbent)
  3. **Homero Mercado**
  4. Zenaida de Castro
  5. Ryan Benjamin Yu
  6. Orlando Marquez
  7. Marieto Garvida
  8. Ferdinand Otaza
  9. Rodolfo de Ocampo
10. 1Guardians Nationalist of the Philippines (1Ganap/Guardians)
  - First list:
    1. Ernesto Macahiya
    2. Manolo Diamante
    3. Ponciano Mapuyan
    4. Jose Reyne Rabuya
    5. Virgilio Bolor
  - Second list:
    1. Victorino Villanueva
    2. Jose Reyne Rabuya
    3. Antonio Amulong
    4. Wigmore Capiendo
    5. Lorenzo Bulan Jr.
11. 1st Kabalikat ng Bayan Ginhawang Sangkatauhan (1st Kabagis)
  1. Roman Wanasen
  2. Jose Singson Jr.
  3. Eugenio Labitoria
  4. Constantino Gantinao III
  5. Enrique Rivas
12. First People's Representative for Indigent Student Athletes (1st PRISA) (Note: Melanio Mauricio Jr. was initially listed as the third nominee of 1st PRISA, but withdrew on March 26, 2010.)
  1. Gabriel Martin Angeles
  2. Edward Chua
  3. Gonzalo Duque
  4. Laureano Santos
13. A Blessed Federation of Farmers and Fishermen International (A Blessed Party-List)
  1. Tapa Umal
  2. Expedito Lorente
  3. Macario Baricaua
  4. Antonio Umali
  5. Ma. Editha Madroño
14. Ang Tao Muna at Bayan (A Tambay)
  1. Mohammad Omar Fajardo
  2. Jaime Pelaez
  3. Leandro Jose Domalanta
  4. Farida Fajardo
  5. Ernesto Sotto
15. **Advocacy for Teacher Empowerment Through Action, Cooperation and Harmony Towards Educational Reforms (A Teacher)**
  1. **Mariano Piamonte Jr.** (incumbent)
  2. **Julieta Cortuna**
  3. Nenita Habulan
  4. Elizabeth Saldivar
  5. Joseph Noel Estrada
16. Agapay ng Indigenous Peoples Rights Alliance (A-IPRA)
  1. Eugenio Insigne
  2. Gregorio Andolana
  3. Pablo Bernardo
  4. Zainudin Malang
  5. Glairthe Andolana
17. **Kasosyo Producers-Consumer Exchange Association (AA-Kasosyo)**
  1. **Solaiman Pangandaman**
  2. Raynor Taroy
  3. Percival Peralta
  4. Juan Nepomuceno
  5. Roseten Tugaff
18. Alliance of Advocates in Mining Advancement for National Progress (AAMA)
  1. Allan Ralph Basa
  2. Dennis Uy
  3. Rafael Banigued Jr.
  4. Noe Taojo
  5. Randolph Cadiogan
19. **Ang Asosasyon sang Mangunguma nga Bisaya-Owa Mangunguma (AAMBIS-Owa)**
  1. **Sharon Garin**
  2. Carina Flores
  3. Eduard Trinidad
  4. Rudy Canastillo
  5. Ephrem Dadivas
20. Agrikultura Natin Isulong (AANI)
  1. Roberto Rodriguez
  2. Roy Rosales
  3. Jose Umadhay
  4. Roberto Lozada
  5. Fiorello Azura
21. Association of Administrators, Professionals and Seniors (AAPS)
  1. Edna Azurin
  2. Francis Andre Azurin
  3. Felicisima Teodoro
  4. Josefina San Juan
  5. Demetrio Monis
22. Alliance and Advocates for Senior Citizens Affairs (AASCA)
  1. Franco Puzon
  2. Alfredo Ripoli Sr.
  3. Quintin Paredes III
  4. Reginald Lee
  5. Milagros Belizario
23. Alyansang Bayanihan ng mga Magsasaka, Manggagawang-Bukid at Mangungisda (ABA)
  1. Leonardo Montemayor (incumbent)
  2. Dioscoro Granada
  3. Jose Nebrao
  4. Jose Morales
  5. Makilito Mahinay
24. Abante Ilonggo (Aba Ilonggo)
  - First list:
    1. Daniel Laogan Jr.
    2. Monette Occeño
    3. Adrian Zayco
    4. Blanca Santiago
    5. Nole Cordon
  - Second list:
    1. Aguinaldo Miravalles
    2. Rogelio Zambarrano
    3. Arturo Mejorada
    4. Gerald John Javellana
    5. Roberto Palada
25. Abakada Guro (Abakada)
  - First list:
    1. Samson Alcantara
    2. Romeo Robiso
    3. Lope Feble
    4. Noel Tiampong
    5. Jerry Alfonso
  - Second set:
    1. Jonathan dela Cruz (incumbent)
    2. Ed Vincent Albano
    3. Arsenio Jallorina
    4. Josephine Reyes
    5. Rosalie Esteban
26. **Abante Mindanao (Abamin)**
  1. **Maximo Rodriguez Jr.**
  2. Virginia Sering
  3. Sergio Pascual
  4. Raynor Fulgencio
  5. Irenetta Montinola
27. Abang Lingkod
  1. Dionisio Manuel
  2. Leonardo Tayag
  3. Benjamin Jackson Arenas Jr.
  4. Carlo Gomer Ladia
  5. Reynaldo David
28. Abante Katutubo (Abante Ka) (Note: Lorenzo Dinlayan was initially listed as the fourth nominee of Abante Katutubo, but did not accept the nomination.)
  1. Romulo Lumauig
  2. Jose Lopez
  3. Mustapha Sambolawan
  4. Jose Aspiras
29. Abay Parak Party-List (Abay Parak)
  1. Nilo Geonzon
  2. Rizaldo Realubit
  3. Nilo Quiros
  4. Bonel Balingit
  5. Cyril John Pelayo
30. Alliance of Believers Bridge in Attaining Accurate and Meaningful Advancement (ABBA-AMA)
  1. Joselito de Guia
  2. Dennis Opeña
  3. Arden Cabigas
  4. Joel Vicmudo
  5. Leopoldo Culminas
31. Alliance for Barangay Concerns (ABC)
  1. Arnulfo Molero
  2. Gerardo Panghulan
  3. James Marty Lim
  4. Fredelino Tudio
  5. Alfredito Forteza
32. Abante Bicol Oragon (ABO)
  1. Procio Pilapil
  2. Reynaldo Santos
  3. Ramon Navarro
  4. Rozel Santos
  5. Jaime Indiana Jr.
33. **Abono Partylist (Abono)**
  1. **Robert Raymond Estrella** (incumbent)
  2. **Francisco Ortega III** (incumbent)
  3. Jacky Rowena Lomibao
  4. Ronald Allan So
  5. Ponciano Onia Jr.
34. Abot Tanaw
  1. Gerwyn See
  2. Mario Cornista
  3. Tomas Toledo
  4. Francis Adrian Comendador
  5. Kent Brian Tan
35. Alliance of Bicolnon Party (ABP-Bicolnon)
  1. Enrique Olonan
  2. Henry Steve Olonan
  3. Jose Pobocan
  4. Gregoria Castillo
  5. Jose Sarza Jr.
36. Action Brotherhood for Active Dreamers (Abroad)
  1. Danilo Dy
  2. Angela Dy
  3. Divine Puno
  4. Rema Valencia
  5. Jerico Magsino
37. **Arts Business and Science Professionals (ABS)**
  1. **Catalina Leonen-Pizarro** (incumbent)
  2. Eugene Michael de Vera
  3. Mary Jazul
  4. Catalina Lanting
  5. Carlito Buentipo
38. A Convergence for Mindanao Agenda (ACMA)
39. **ACT Teachers**
  1. **Antonio Tinio**
  2. France Castro
  3. Efleda Bautista
  4. Jocelyn Bisuña
  5. Mae Fe Ancheta-Templa
  6. Gregorio Fabros
40. Alliance for Community Transformation and Service (ACTS)
  1. Feliciano Adorna Jr.
  2. Albert Anosa
  3. Ernesto Maceda
  4. Jovita Prades
  5. Edgardo Bajon
41. Agrarian Development Association (ADA)
  1. Victor Manuel Jr.
  2. Eugenio Manaois
  3. Teresita Victoria Agbayani
  4. Manuel Dindo Bangsal
  5. Elena Jornacion
  6. Arthur Jose Ang
42. Adhikain ng mga Dakilang Anak Maharlika (ADAM)
  1. Zamzamin Ampatuan
  2. Rodolfo Gerardo Leon Serrano III
  3. Ana Eleanor Intrina
  4. Bai Puti Ampatuan
  5. Juvy Lyn Geraldo
43. Action for Dynamic Development (ADD)
  1. Sanipa Camid
  2. Mauyag Papandayan Jr.
  3. Joseph Rudolph Lo
  4. Puruji Maang
  5. Johnny Villa
44. Action for Democracy and Development for the Tribal People (Add-Tribal)
  1. Abdurahman Amin
  2. Salem Bagis Jr.
  3. Princess Putih Mabol
  4. Rebecca Usman
  5. Narcisa Galgo
45. Alliance for Philippines Security Guards Cooperative (AFPSEGCO)
  1. Sotero Leonero Jr.
  2. David Braña III
  3. Aida Laggui
  4. Emma Villa
  5. Kathrene Tuboc
46. **Ang Galing Pinoy Partylist (AG)**
  1. **Mikey Arroyo**
  2. Dennis Pineda
  3. Romeo Dungca Jr.
  4. Jerold Dominick David
  5. Ryan Caladiao
47. **Agricultural Sector Alliance of the Philippines (AGAP)**
  1. **Nicanor Briones** (incumbent)
  2. Rico Geron
  3. Albert Roque Lim Jr.
  4. Victorino Michael Lescano
  5. Benjamin Jaro
48. **Agbiag! Timpuyog Ilocano (Agbiag)**
  1. **Patricio Antonio**
  2. Erika Caitlin Dy
  3. Hansel Joseph Michael Tillmann
  4. Visitacion Ordoveza
  5. Jorge Sales
49. **Alyansa ng mga Grupong Haligi ng Agham at Teknolohiya para sa Mamamayan (AGHAM)**
  1. **Angelo Palmones**
  2. Anselmo Adriano
  3. Florentino Tesoro
  4. Ruby Ephraim Rubiano
  5. Cleotilde Elmedolan
50. Agila ng Katutubong Pilipino (Agila)
  1. Cedric James Valera
  2. Restituto Malangen
  3. Orlando Hondrade
  4. Elorde Valera
  5. Bonifacio Dacuyan
51. Agri-Agra na Reporma para sa Magsasaka ng Pilipinas Movement (AGRI)
  1. Michael Ryan Enriquez
  2. Minerva Arellano
  3. Sunshine Hope Verzosa
  4. Cheryl Cavan
  5. Ronald Canen
52. Ahon Pinoy (Ahon)
  1. Dante Francis Ang II
  2. Emerito Remulla
  3. Von Bryan Cuerpo
  4. Efren Villaseñor
  5. Fundador Soriano
53. Akbay Kalusugan (AK)
54. Ang Kalusugan para sa Pinoy (AKAP)
  1. Ma. Welma Nenita de Guzman
  2. Joel Otarra
  3. Felicitas Sison
  4. Dioscoro Reyes
  5. Wesly-Jo Cruz
55. Akap Bata
  1. Joy Alcantara
  2. Arlene Brosas
  3. Evelyn Guerrero
  4. Angelita Galban
  5. Gloria Mallillin-Lumabi
56. Akap Kapatiran para sa Tangkilikan ng mga Obrero (Akap Tao)
  1. Annelie Ofreneo-Carreon
  2. Emmanuel Pelayo
  3. Carlo Alejandrino
  4. Julius Abela
  5. Elvie Madrona
57. **Ako Bicol Political Party (AKB)**
  1. **Christopher Co**
  2. **Rodel Batocabe**
  3. **Alfredo Garbin**
  4. Ronald Ang
  5. Carlo Paolo Pangilinan
58. **Akbayan Citizens' Action Party (Akbayan)**
  1. **Walden Bello** (incumbent)
  2. **Kaka Bag-ao**
  3. Tomasito Villarin
  4. Ellene Sana
  5. Francis Isaac
  6. Ruperto Aleroza
59. Angkan Katutubo (AKI)
  1. Victor Lorza
  2. Porfino Castillo Jr.
  3. Elsa Auson
  4. Rafael Guiriba
  5. Janet Vicente
60. Aksyon Magsasaka Partido Tinig ng Masa (AKMA-PTM)
  1. Michael Kida
  2. Crispin Carreon
  3. Ramon Vegas
  4. Jeny Dueñas
  5. Antonio Lentija
61. Ako Ayoko sa Bawal na Droga (Ako)
  1. Ma. Corazon Sarmiento
  2. Rodolfo Caisip
  3. Roque Emigdio Luis Bello III
  4. Francis Rico Javier
  5. Noriel Cruz
62. Ako Agila sa Nagkakaisang Magsasaka (Ako Agila)
  1. Josef Maganduga
  2. Catherine David
  3. Santiago Cea
  4. Florencio Sandil
  5. Hospicio Galang Jr.
63. Adhikain at Kilusan ng Ordinaryong Tao para sa Lupa, Hanapbuhay at Kaunlaran (Ako Bahay)
  1. Percival Chavez
  2. Ma. Perla Tablante
  3. Maria Beverly Rascene Lingo
  4. Mercedes Castro
  5. John Nofuente
64. Ang Kapisanan ng mga Seaman (AKSI)
  1. Reynaldo Valeros Jr.
  2. Lamberto Torres
  3. Jimmy Besinio
  4. Nestor Vargas
  5. Carlito Gesalan
65. **Alagad Party-list (Alagad)**
  1. **Rodante Marcoleta** (incumbent)
  2. Diogenes Osabel
  3. Ric Domingo
  4. Sergio Manzana
  5. Rodrigo Olarte Sr.
  6. Miguel Malvar III
  7. Allan Maasir
66. **Alay Buhay Community Development Foundation (Alay Buhay)**
  1. **Wes Gatchalian**
  2. Antonio Sayo
  3. Miguel Varela
  4. Rodolfo Mallari
  5. Crisanto Sabino
67. **Association of Laborers and Employees (ALE)**
  1. **Catalina Bagasina**
  2. Erlinda de Leon
  3. Ma. Michaela Magtoto
  4. Carolina Visda
  5. Romeo Torno
68. **Ang Laban ng Indigong Pilipino (ALIF)**
  1. **Acmad Tomawis (incumbent)**
  2. Abdulwahab Amerol
  3. Macakuna Casar
  4. Jamela Tomawis
  5. Muslima Pangadir
69. Action League of Indigenous Masses (ALIM)
  1. Rasol Mitmug Jr.
  2. Don Ferdinand Daquial
  3. Fatani Abdul Malik
  4. Ibrahim Undain
  5. Mohammad Raul Alonto
70. Alyansa Lumad Mindanao (Allumad)
  1. Julius Mabandos
  2. Ian Ybañez
  3. Agnes Escudero
  4. Gregorio Rosales
  5. Mario Tarife
71. Alma sa Pagkahikahos at Ignoransiya (ALMA)
  1. Celso Magliba
  2. Rodolfo Vicerra
  3. Christian Albert Braganza
  4. Melvin Manuel
  5. David Cabanilla
72. Alyansa ng Mamamayang Naghihirap (Almana)
  1. Ernesto Arellano
  2. Eduardo Landayan
  3. Trinidad Domingo
  4. Nathaniel Clores
  5. Lourdes Guia
73. Alyansa ng mga Naulila ng mga Tagapagtanggol ng Bayan (ALNA)
  1. Charlemagne Alejandrino
  2. Gloria Abendan
  3. Annabelle Bueno
  4. Fernando Abcede
  5. Sinforoso Zapanta Jr.
74. Alon Party-List (Alon)
  1. Richard Ritual
  2. Joseph Vernon Patano
  3. Jaime Quinoñes
  4. Telesforo Solda
  5. Rodolfo Aspillaga
75. Alyansa Lumad (ALUM)
  1. Manuel Sabillo
  2. Cesar Betil
  3. Bartolomio Maing
  4. Mario Lansoy
  5. Bienvenido Alanib
76. Alyansa ng OFW
  1. Abolcair Guro
  2. Nhazrudin Dianalan
  3. Meycauayan Atil
  4. Gerardo Cuares
77. Ang Mata'y Alagaan (AMA)
  1. Joel Go
  2. Raoul Victorino
  3. Carolina de Jesus
  4. Carmelita Pascual
  5. Patrick Lozada
78. Aksyon ng Mamamayang Nagkakaisa (AMANA)
  1. Nassief Malawani
  2. Pendatun Disimban
  3. Suaib Tuttuh
  4. Jolly Lais
  5. Datu Khomieni Bansuan
79. Asosasyon ng mga Maliliit na Negosyanteng Gumaganap (AMANG)
  1. Marcelino Arias
  2. Dan Navarro
  3. Edwin Tan
  4. Giovanni Melgar
  5. Enrique Fajardo
80. Alliance of Mindanao Elders (AME)
  1. Alfonso Goking
  2. Antonio Oppus
  3. Jose Pamplona Sr.
  4. Gonzalo Go
  5. Felix Abella
81. Anak Mindanao (AMIN)
  - First list:
    1. Santos Unsad
    2. Amabella Carumba
    3. Acmad Macatimbol
    4. Teodolita Suano
    5. Sunny Jumuad
    6. Charlie Trozo
  - Second list:
    1. Ariel Hernandez (incumbent)
    2. Sitti Djalia Hataman
    3. Deonato Mokudef
    4. Alejandro Plariza
82. Alyansa ng Media at Showbiz (AMS)
  1. Rolando Gonzalo
  2. Manny Calayan
  3. Leo Martinez
  4. Edgardo Dee
  5. Jose Joel Egco
83. **An Waray**
  1. **Bem Noel** (incumbent)
  2. **Neil Benedict Montejo** (incumbent)
  3. Jude Acidre
  4. Victoria Isabel Noel
  5. Joi Bernaditt de Paz
84. **Alliance for Nationalism and Democracy (ANAD)**
  - First list:
    1. **Pastor Alcover Jr.** (incumbent)
    2. Baltaire Balangauan
    3. Pastor Alcover II
    4. Roel Dago-oc
    5. Domingo Balang
  - Second list:
    1. David Odilao Jr.
    2. Leborio Jangao Jr.
    3. Alexander Martin Canonigo
    4. Bernardo Mabbagu
    5. Herminigildo Gonzaga
85. Angat Ating Kabuhayan Pilipinas (ANAK)
  1. Eduardo Octaviano Jr.
  2. Eliseo dela Paz
  3. Oscar Bunyu
  4. Julito Sarito
  5. Imelda Payumo
86. Alagaan Natin Ating Kalusugan (Anakalusugan)
  1. Ronald Kempis
  2. Juan Lagunzad
  3. Athena Avvy Mangondato
  4. Mohammad Ali Basir Lucman
  5. Ma. Concepcion Hilario
87. **Anakpawis** (Note: Vicente Borja was initially listed as the tenth nominee of Anakpawis, but did not accept the nomination.)
  1. **Rafael V. Mariano** (incumbent)
  2. Joel Maglunsod (incumbent)
  3. Randall Echanis
  4. George San Mateo
  5. Verleen Trinidad
  6. Gloria Arellano
  7. Roy Velez
  8. Felix Paz
  9. Jaime Paglinawan
  10. Edwin Batac
  11. Fernando Hicap
  12. Franchiquita Buhayan
88. **Kasangga sa Kaunlaran (Ang Kasangga)**
  1. **Teodorico Haresco Jr.**
  2. Eugenio Jose Lacson
  3. Anna Maria Nava
  4. Enrique Martin
  5. Segundo Gaston
89. Ang Ladlad LGBT Party (Ang Ladlad)
  1. Bembol Aleeh Benedito
  2. Germaine Trittle Leonin
  3. Crisanto Lopera Jr.
  4. Tito Paulo Fontanos
  5. Adelo Macaldo
90. Sectoral Party of Ang Minero (Ang Minero)
  1. Lomino Kaniteng
  2. Patrick Caoile
  3. Luis Sarmiento
  4. Joel Muyco
  5. Pedro Patacsil
91. Ang National Coalition on Indigenous People's Action (Ang NICP)
92. Alliance of Nationalistic and Genuine Program for Agricultural Development Towards Economic Reform (Ang Pader)
  1. Pastor Gamit
  2. Al Ignatius Lopez
  3. Benjamin Tancio
  4. Roger Navarro
  5. Rolando Lee
93. Ang Partido Demokratiko Rural (Ang PDR)
  1. Romeo Royandoyan
  2. Jaime Tadeo
  3. Amelita Balisalisa-Atillo
  4. Jose Adorable
  5. Froilyn Mendoza
94. Ang Samahan para sa Magandang Kabuhayan (Ang Samaka)
  1. Reynaldo Quindara
  2. Virginia Castro
  3. Maria Yolanda dela Paz
  4. Elmer Samonte
  5. Ruben Santos
95. Ang Asosasyon ng mga Trabahador at Pahinante (Ang Trabahante)
  1. Arthur Alvin Aguilar
  2. Garrick John Nayo
  3. Michael Mayo
  4. Michael Abaya
  5. Regie Amarante
96. Ang Tagapagtaguyod ng Sikap sa Ikauunland ng mga Pinoy (Ang Tsinoy)
  1. Carmelo Redencion de Leoz Jr.
  2. Ronaldo Bohol
  3. Isabelo Osmeña Sr.
  4. Jose Manalese Jr.
  5. Marcelino Manuel
97. Alliance of National Urban Poor Organization Assembly (ANUPA)
  1. Rosemarie Mejorada
  2. Pantaleon Morallos Sr.
  3. Siegfried Zosa
  4. Pablo Sayson
  5. Danilo Llanzana
98. **Association of Philippine Electric Cooperatives (APEC)**
  1. **Ponciano Payuyo**
  2. Lamberto Canlas
  3. Andres Garcia
  4. Rolando Reinoso
  5. Lennie Joy Alviola
99. Advocates for Penology Enhancement and Legal Assistance (APELA)
  1. Arturo ALit
  2. Henric David
  3. Marianito Miranda
  4. Armando Llamasares
  5. Mark Miranda
100. Alliance of People's Organization (APO)
  1. Salacnib Baterina
  2. Janette Tulagan
  3. Anna Marie Ablan
  4. Jamirah Maasir
  5. Danilo Dasan
101. Akbay Pinoy OFW National (APOI)
  1. Melchor Rosales
  2. Rosario Dizon
  3. Arturo Tomaneng
  4. Katherine Mari Garcia
  5. Adelaida Lazaro
102. Association for Righteousness Advocacy in Leadership (ARAL)
  1. Maria Socorro Malitao
  2. Mauro Quiroben Jr.
  3. Tomas Pastor
  4. Francis Dy
  5. Celso San Andres
103. Alliance for Rural and Agrarian Reconstruction (ARARO)
  1. Quirino dela Torre
  2. Elmer Cainday
  3. Conchita Quibod
  4. Tomas Trinidad
  5. Michelle Sia
  6. Jose Alangwawi
  7. Agustin Sarion Jr.
  8. Henry Giron
  9. Michael Gonzales
  10. Jaime Beltran Jr.
104. Alliance for Rural Concerns (ARC)
  1. Oscar Francisco (incumbent)
  2. Frank Roy Ribo
  3. Mark Amor
  4. Ramon Espiritu
  5. Joel Alapar
105. Alliance of Regional Coalitions Against People's Poverty (ARCAPP)
  1. Bayan Balt
  2. Michael Milares
  3. Flor Esteban
  4. Abdul Rakim Mutin
  5. Mustapha Abdullah
106. Alay Serbisyo (Workers in the Informal Sector Economy) (AS)
  1. Peter Paul Sanvicente
  2. Andres Tionko
  3. Marc Jershum Maglinong
  4. Nicanor Salameda Jr.
  5. Ricardo Pellosis
107. Advocates for Special Children and Handicapped Movement (Asahan Mo) (Note: Nicasio Conti was initially listed as the third nominee of Asahan Mo, but withdrew on March 30, 2010.)
  1. Jun Omar Ebdane
  2. Christian Jan Cecilio
  3. Ianela Jusi-Barrantes
  4. Danilo de Jesus
108. **Aangat Tayo (AT)**
  1. **Daryl Grace Abayon** (incumbent)
  2. Eden Debulgado-Rivera
  3. Patricia Mae Veloso
  4. Antonio Rom III
  5. Jean Andaca-Bautista
109. **Adhikain Tinataguyod ng Kooperatiba (Ating-Koop)**
  1. **Isidro Lico**
  2. Roberto Mascariña
  3. Sylvia Flores
  4. Reynaldo Golo
  5. Francis Loque
  6. Gloria Futalan
110. Abante Tribung Makabansa (ATM)
  1. Allen Capuyan
  2. Reuben Dasay Lingating
  3. Joel Unad
  4. Edtami Mansayagan
  5. Alma Binayao
111. Atong Paglaum
  1. Rodolfo Pancrudo
  2. Roelito Gawilan
  3. Felix Vergara Jr.
  4. Ruperto Turla
  5. Macario Baliwis
112. Alliance Transport Sector (ATS)
  1. Virgilio Mortera
  2. Vincent Michael Velasco
  3. Jaime Domdom
  4. Leopoldo Villareña
  5. Letecia Gorospe
113. **Alliance of Volunteer Educators (AVE)**
  1. **Eulogio Magsaysay**
  2. Iris Marie Montes
  3. Adelaida Magsaysay
  4. Nicolas Braña Sr.
  5. Alicia Diel
114. Alliance of Vigilant Protectors of Aquatic Products (AVPAP)
115. Anti War/Anti Terror Mindanao Peace Movement (AWAT)
  1. Jose Agduma II
  2. Christy Joy Arellano
  3. Rabanes Pundato Jr.
  4. Jose Neoldino del Corro Jr.
  5. Diomedes Fanlo Jr.
116. Babae para sa Kaunlaran (Babae Ka)
  1. Nerissa Garcia
  2. Jacqueline Lingad-Ricci
  3. Ruth Vasquez
  4. Maria Corazon Tumang
  5. Dalisay Suansing
117. Bago National Cultural Society of the Philippines (Bago)
  1. Romualdo Dumling
  2. Simplicio Dang-awan Jr.
  3. Manuel Mariano Jr.
  4. Rudolfo Lockey
  5. Benjamin Justo
118. Barangay Natin (BANAT)
  1. Salvador Britanico (incumbent)
  2. Edgar Igano
  3. Rodolfo Salazar
  4. Roberto Fajardo
  5. Rolando Bautista
119. Bagong Bayan na Nagtataguyod ng Demokratikong Ideolohiya at Layunin (Bandila)
  1. Milton Ngu
  2. Nilo Tayag
  3. Juan Miguel Bondoc
  4. Roel Purisima
  5. Albert Encarnacion
120. Bagong Koalisyon ng Nagkakaisang Samahan sa Sektor ng Transportasyon (Bangon Transport)
  1. Ricardo Papa
  2. Cesar Ambrosio
  3. Julian Oliva Jr.
  4. Ferdinand Bautista
  5. Vulfre Estepa
121. The True Marcos Loyalist (For God, Country & People) Association of the Phil. (Bantay)
  1. Maria Evangelina Palparan
  2. Bienvinido Caralde
  3. Felix Desiderio Jr.
  4. Juanito Gomez
  5. Jefferson Ong
122. **Bayan Muna**
  1. **Teodoro Casiño** (incumbent)
  2. **Neri Colmenares** (incumbent)
  3. Joven Laura
  4. Carlos Isagani Zarate
  5. Leovigildo Molon
123. Bayani Partylist (Bayani)
  1. Guiling Mamondiong
  2. Diosdado Padilla
  3. Christopher Aggabao Jr.
  4. Jamil Usman
  5. Edgardo Acaba
124. **Bagong Henerasyon (BH)**
  1. **Bernadette Herrera**
  2. Edgar Allan Dy
  3. Dan Stephen Palami
  4. Alexandrea Cruz-Herrera
  5. Druscella Medici
125. Batang Iwas Droga (Bida (Batang Iwas))
  1. Sheryl See
  2. Johnny Tan
  3. Emilio Marcelo
  4. Lamberto Barbin
  5. Dennis Villa-Ignacio
126. Binigkis na Interes ng mga Drayber sa Adhikain (Bida (Binigkis))
127. Bigkis Pinoy Movement (Bigkis)
128. Binhi: Partido ng mga Magsasaka para sa mga Magsasaka (Binhi)
  1. Pacifico Rico Fajardo Jr.
  2. Florentino Pangilinan
  3. Nelson Villanueva
  4. Victoriano Perez Jr.
  5. Rodolfo Torreda Jr.
129. Biyaheng Pinoy Sectoral Organization (Biyaheng Pinoy)
  1. Narciso Santiago III
  2. Jesus Cruz
  3. Alvin Feliciano
  4. Ismael Sevilla
  5. Rico Judge Janvier Echiverri
130. **Buhay Hayaan Yumabong (Buhay)**
  1. **Mariano Michael Velarde Jr.**
  2. **Irwin Tieng** (incumbent)
  3. Ignacio Gimenez
  4. Wilfrido Villarama
  5. Mariano Velarde
131. Biyayang Bukid (Bukid)
  - First list:
    1. Mohammad Camil Abdullah
    2. Rosemarie Palacio
    3. Bonifacio Echauz
    4. Napoleon Venturina
    5. Franklin Calpito
  - Second list:
    1. Teofilo Villamar
    2. Nicolas Neri
    3. Florida Robes
    4. Oliver Yuan
    5. Arsenio Mesiona
132. Kabukluran ng mga Kababaihan Filipina sa Timog Katagalugan (Buklod Filipina)
  1. Zenaida Tobias
  2. Mila Lamb
  3. Elena Santa Ana
  4. Olivia Laban
  5. Carmen Santiago
133. **Butil Farmers Party (Butil)**
  - First list:
    1. **Agapito Guanlao** (incumbent)
    2. Cecilia Leonila Chavez
    3. Rufino Hernandez
    4. Isidoro Santos
    5. Prudencio Consolacion
  - Second list:
    1. Herminio Ocampo
    2. Maximiano Cempron
    3. Gerardo Dilig
    4. Guillermo Carisma Jr.
    5. Antonio Quilang
134. Champions for Innovative Employment (Chinoy)
  1. Judy Tumangan
  2. Rogelio Amatorio Jr.
  3. Jennifer Casino
  4. Christine Joy Cayetano
  5. William Herbert Baluyut
135. **Citizens' Battle Against Corruption (CIBAC)**
  - First list:
    1. **Sherwin Tugna**
    2. **Cinchona Cruz-Gonzales** (incumbent)
    3. Armi Jane Borje
    4. Emil Galang
    5. Carlos Muncada Jr.
  - Second list:
    1. Luis Lokin Jr.
    2. Lydinyda Nacpil
    3. Teresita Planas
    4. Renecio Espiritu Jr.
136. Cocofed-Philippine Coconut Producers Federation (Cocofed)
  1. Domingo Espina
  2. Jose Valmores
  3. Jose Lobregat
  4. Celestino Sabate
  5. Jose Gomez
137. Coconut Farmers Association of Linamon, Lanao del Norte (COFA)
  1. Neneth Omar
  2. Editha Mabuhay
  3. Gorgonio Unde
  4. Sittie Arianne Boransing
  5. Julius Labunog
138. Confederation of Non-Stock Savings and Loan Associations (Consla)
  1. Ricardo Nolasco Jr.
  2. George Uy
  3. Melchor Ramos
  4. Samuel Padilla
  5. Miguel Villaor
139. **Cooperative NATCCO Network Party (Coop-NATCCO)**
  1. **Jose Ping-ay** (incumbent)
  2. **Cresente Paez** (incumbent)
  3. Luis Carillo
  4. Divina Quemi
  5. Emmanuel Solis Jr.
140. Citizens Power Movement (CPM)
141. Damayan Alliance of the Aging & Disabled Filipinos (Damayan)
  1. Gregorio del Prado
  2. Rachel Bongar
  3. Jonathan Jesus Navea
  4. Lordegil Fernandez
  5. Elisa Martinez
142. **Democratic Independent Workers Association (DIWA)**
  1. **Emmeline Aglipay**
  2. Ramon Bergado
  3. Pepito Pico
  4. Leopoldo Blanco Jr.
  5. Federico Balanag
143. Aabante Emmanuel Civic Association (Emmanuel)
  1. Norma Nueva
  2. Florentino Teruel
  3. Ismael Naga III
  4. Ramil Gabao
  5. Renato Fanuncio
144. Free Workers (FFW)
  1. Allan Montaño
  2. Jose Cayobit
  3. Alfredo Maranan
  4. Alvin Gonzales
  5. Priscilla Villacorta
145. Filipino Muslim Organization (Fil-Mus)
  1. Hassan Dalimbang
  2. Ato Dimananal
  3. Samaon Buat
  4. Mhumar Ali Mohamad
  5. Anwar Tulino
146. Firm 24-K Association (Firm 24-K)
  1. Artemio Lachica
  2. Rodolfo Santoyo Jr.
  3. Arnulfo Balbin
  4. Genevee Yamson
  5. Noel Nicolas
147. **Gabriela Women's Party (Gabriela)**
  1. **Luzviminda Ilagan** (incumbent)
  2. **Emmi de Jesus**
  3. Sheila Ferrer
  4. Nenita Cherniguin
  5. Leona Entena
148. Green Force for the Environment - Sons and Daughters of Mother Earth (Green Force)
  1. Ramon Ignacio
  2. Guillermo Lazaro Jr.
  3. Freddie Feir
  4. Jaime Gonzales
  5. Lima Abaigar-Tolentino
149. Itinerant Vendors Alliance of the Philippines (IVAP)
  1. Karim Panumpang
  2. Khalil Pangcoga
  3. Manggay Guro
  4. Alibasir Somagumba
  5. Ibrahim Macacua
150. Kaunlaran ng Agrikultura Asensadong Probinsya Angat ng Bayan (Kaagapay)
  1. Javier Vicente Coscolluela
  2. Juan Carlos Pineda
  3. Nelia Fuentebella
  4. Luz Cabungcal
  5. Elizabeth Zavalla
151. Katipunan ng mga Anak ng Bayan All Filipino Democratic Movement (Kaakbay)
  1. Alain Del Pascua
  2. Leonor Briones
  3. Eulogio Tumbali
  4. Cicero Lumauig
  5. Daniel Galvan
152. **Kabataan Partylist (Kabataan)**
  1. **Raymond Palatino** (incumbent)
  2. Mark Louie Aquino
  3. Kathrina Castillo
  4. Renil Oliva
  5. Ken Leonard Ramos
153. Kabalikat ng Mamamayan (Kabayan)
  1. Ron Salo
  2. Jessie Nietes
  3. Alberto Kimpo
  4. Hazel Caguimbal
  5. Lea Catura
154. **Kapatiran ng mga Nakulong na Walang Sala (Kakusa)**
  1. **Ranulfo Canonigo** (incumbent)
  2. Ma. Jesusa Sespeñe
  3. Omar Rivera
  4. Carmelito Tunguia
  5. Fernando Manuñgas Jr.
155. Kalahi Sectoral Party (Kalahi)
  1. Eleazar Quinto
  2. Apostol Poe Gratela
  3. Charles Medillo
  4. Jovita Dacquil
  5. George Bautista
156. **Kalinga-Advocacy for Social Empowerment and Nation Building Through Easing Poverty (Kalinga)**
  1. **Abigail Faye Ferriol**
  2. Uzziel Caponpon
  3. Osinando Quillao Jr.
  4. Irene Gay Saulog
  5. Michael Cruz
157. Koalison ng Katutubong Samahan ng Pilipinas (Kasapi)
  1. Victorino Saway
  2. Rodolfo Canam
  3. Isagani Santos
  4. Fernando Mudai
  5. Vicky Macay
158. Katribu Indigenous People's Sectoral Party (Katribu)
  1. Beverly Longid
  2. Genasque Enriquez
  3. Nelson Mallari
  4. Kerlan Fanagel
  5. Vigilio Aniceto
159. Partido Katutubong Pilipino (Katutubo)
  1. Jannette Reisland
  2. Agustin Petican
  3. Tyrone Power Calo
  4. Josephet Banghulot
  5. Reynaldo Mejia
160. Kababaihang Lingkod Bayan sa Pilipinas (KLBP)
  1. Teresita Lazaro
  2. Ma. Carmen Lazaro
  3. Venancia Corcuera
  4. Rhodora Anonuevo
  5. Amabel Reyes
161. **LPG Marketers Association (LPGMA)**
  1. **Arnel Ty**
  2. Sinforoso Pagunsan
  3. Salvador Escaño
  4. Jose Cruz III
  5. Ramon Torralba
162. Youth League for Peace Advancement Partylist (LYPAD)
  1. Teoann Elaine Masiglat
  2. Horacio Alexander Morales II
  3. Anne Laurice Militsala
  4. Joy Sanrio Asensi
  5. Jose Glenn Nahil
163. National Council for Commuter Protection (NCCP)
  1. Elvira Medina
  2. Alejandro Contillo
  3. Ramon Ike Señeres
  4. Tomas Emerito Magdangal
  5. Melanie Bacerra
164. Pamilyang OFW-SME Network Foundation (OPO)
  1. Joel Itallo
  2. Rafael de Leon
  3. Vicente Millora
  4. Alfredo Ramos
  5. Irene Rentino
165. Organization of Regional Advocates for Good Governance Onward Nation-Building (Oragon)
  1. Felizardo Colambo
  2. Jose Saribong
  3. Victor Daet
  4. Ludivina Francisco
  5. Dexter Francisco
  6. Salvador Belaro Jr.
166. Pilipino Association for Country Urban for Youth Advancement and Welfare (Pacyaw)
  1. Janet Rita Lazatin
  2. Reynaldo Pineda
  3. Alikmatial Gonzales
  4. Grace Evasco
  5. Deo Saludario
167. **Puwersa ng Bayaning Atleta (PBA)**
  1. **Mark Aeron Sambar**
  2. Miles Andrew Roces
  3. Mark Daya
  4. Alberto Pacquiao
  5. Ernanie Calica
168. Pro Active on Climate Change Leaders (PCL)
  1. Victor Ferrer Jr.
  2. Benito Brizuela
  3. Ma. Lourdes Angelica Ibuna
  4. Eddie Ilarde
  5. Enrique Linsangan
169. Parents Enabling Parents Coalition Party (PEP)
  1. Philip Piccio
  2. VIcente Ortuoste
  3. Jose Maria Zayco
  4. Reuben Baldoza Jr.
  5. Cornelio Zafra
170. Peoples Freedom Party (PFP)
171. Partido ng Manggagawa (PM (Manggagawa))
  1. Rene Magtubo
  2. Gerardo Rivera
  3. Judy Ann Miranda
  4. Wilson Fortaleza
  5. Ma. Luisa Parroco
172. Pasang Masda Nationwide (PM (MASDA))
  1. Roberto Martin
  2. Daniel Galang
  3. Raul Raquid
  4. Romulo Semillano
  5. Rogel Fernandez
173. Small Farmers and Land Tillers Association of the Philippines (SABOD)
  1. Anthony Jose Ayco
  2. Ike Barredo
  3. Patrick Nessia
  4. Rollie Martos
  5. Pablo Valin
174. Sagip Kapwa Foundation (Sagip)
  1. Romeo Maganto
  2. Mohammad Isa Perfecto Vergel de Dios Jr.
  3. Jaime Zarraga
  4. Emmanuel Gaming
  5. Renato Demesa
175. Sulong! Barangay Movement (SB)
  1. Herminio Aquino
  2. Nelson Cortez
  3. Romeo Valorozo
  4. Cornelio Ragasa
  5. Antonio Ledesma Jr.
176. **Coalition of Associations of Senior Citizens in the Philippines (Senior Citizens)**
  1. **Godofredo Arquiza** (incumbent)
  2. **David Kho**
  3. Francisco Datol
  4. Remedios Arquiza
  5. Linda David
  6. Nelson Sin
177. Social Movement for Active Reform & Transparency (SMART)
  1. Carlito Cubelo
  2. Jose Calida
  3. Joseph Cubelo
  4. Reynold Osia
  5. Dave Sanchez
178. **Trade Union Congress Party (TUCP)**
  1. **Raymond Mendoza** (incumbent)
  2. Anthony Sasin
  3. Ruben Torres
  4. Roland dela Cruz
  5. Cecilio Seno Jr.
  6. Milagros Ogalinda
179. United Caddies & Green Keepers Association of the Phils. (UCAP)
  1. Hanson So Sr.
  2. Hanson So Jr.
  3. Ruben Antonio
  4. Leovigildo Mijares III
  5. Violeta Gicalde
180. United Filipino Seafarers (UFS)
181. United Movement Against Drug (Uni-Mad)
  1. Teodoro Lim (incumbent)
  2. Harry Lorenzo Jr.
  3. Joel Torregoza
  4. Lilia Lim
  5. Ruben Talampas Jr.
182. Ugnayan ng Nagkakaisang Layunin at Adhikaing Dakila (Unlad Pilipinas)
183. Vendors and Traders Alliance of the Philippines (Vendors Party List)
  1. Yussuf Candidato Macalangcom
  2. Amna Slai
  3. Esmail Macalangcom
  4. Narciso Quiogue
  5. Cristina Caybot
184. Veterans Freedom Party (VFP)
  1. Estrella Santos (incumbent)
  2. Manuel Pamaran
  3. Antonio Collado
  4. Percianita Racho
  5. Joel Joseph Cabides
185. Womenpower
  1. Zenaida Reyes
  2. Gloria Wilma Encarnacion
  3. Maricar Matalam
  4. Eden Divinagracia
  5. Juliet Cruz
186. **You Against Corruption and Poverty (YACAP)**
  1. **Carol Jane Lopez** (incumbent)
  2. Arnel Arbison
  3. Allen Ponsaran Jr.
  4. Kyrie Dea Maia Montemayor
  5. Vianney Garol
187. Yes We Can
  1. Maynard Lapid
  2. Noah Nocon
  3. Amery Santiago
  4. Aristotle Viray
  5. Jean Tadeo
