= City College of Angeles =

Public college in Angeles City, Philippines

- Other name: CCA
- Motto: Totalis Humanae; Santúngan ning Kabiasnan
- Type: Public local government–funded, tuition-free and higher education institution
- Established: 2012; 14 years ago
- Founders: Angeles City Council; Edu Pamintuan; Edgardo Pamintuan Sr.
- Academic affiliations: ALCU
- Chairman: Carmelo Lazatin II (Mayor of Angeles City)
- President: Janet Lazatin
- Vice-president: Janet Lazatin (VP for Administration); Basty A. Sebastian (Executive Vice President); Carolina A. Sarmiento (VP for Academic Affairs); Jean G. Paolo Lacap (VP for Research, Extension, and Quality Assurance)
- Total staff: 318 (2026)
- Students: 6,570 (2026)
- Location: Arayat Boulevard, Barangay Pampang, Angeles City, Pampanga, 2009, Philippines
- Campus: Suburban
- Student publication: The Phoenix - CCA
- Colors: Verdant Green; White
- Nickname: Phoenix
- Website: cca.edu.ph CityCollegeOfAngeles
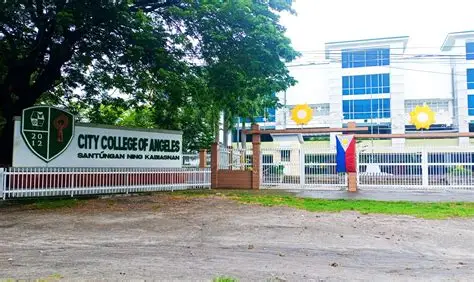

City College of Angeles (CCA) is a free-tuition, local government–funded higher education institution in the independent City of Angeles, Pampanga, Philippines. It was founded in 2012 through an ordinance passed in 2011 by the Angeles City Council and subsequently approved by then-Mayor Edgardo Pamintuan Sr.

In 2026, the college gained international recognition after becoming the first and only local college in the Philippines and the Asia-Pacific region to receive the 5-Star International Center of Excellence in Events Management distinction from the Asia Pacific Institute for Events Management (APIEM) on May 5, while also making its debut in the World University Rankings for Innovation (WURI) on May 6, securing six placements within the Top 100 across multiple innovation categories, marking its first appearance in an international university ranking system.

== History ==
The City College of Angeles was officially established by Ordinance No. 294, s. 2011, passed by the Angeles City Council and approved by then-Mayor Edgardo Pamintuan Sr., aimed at making higher education accessible to local youth in the independent city, the college welcomed its first students in 2012, with an average tuition fee of P7,600.

Initially, the CCA offered only TESDA diploma and certificate programs designed to meet the employment needs of the Clark Freeport Zone, giving graduates better opportunities in the Metro Angeles area. Even before the enactment of Republic Act 10931, CCA had already been granted Free Higher Education (FHE) status by the Commission on Higher Education through the Unified Student Financial Assistance System for Tertiary Education (UniFAST), allowing students to study without tuition fees.

With the passage of the Universal Access to Quality Tertiary Education Act in 2017, the college was formally included among the local universities and colleges (LUCs) covered by the law, guaranteeing full tuition‑free education.

=== Institutional recognition and accreditations ===
In May 2018, the college received a Certificate of Recognition from the Commission on Higher Education (CHED), formally designating it as a full-fledged Higher Educational Institution (HEI). The college was cited as one of only three LUCs in the Central Luzon to receive this formal institutional recognition from CHED Chairperson J. Prospero De Vera III.

In 2025, the college was recognized by CHED with the Excellence in Quality Assurance in Teacher Education (EQUATE) Award. CCA was distinguished as one of only three LUCs in the entire Philippines to receive the award.

Internationally, in 2017, CCA became the first partner community college in the whole of Asia-Pacific to receive a four-star Center of Excellence accreditation by the Asia Pacific Institute for Events Management (APIEM). This recognition was extended in 2019 when three additional courses—Bachelor of Physical Education (BPE), Bachelor of Technical Vocational Teacher Education (BTTE), and Bachelor of Library and Information Science (BLIS)—received APIEM's "Centers of Excellence" accreditation. Seven of CCA's undergraduate programs also received formal accreditation from the Association of Local Colleges and Universities (ALCU) in 2023.

=== Achievements and external partnerships ===
The college has consistently demonstrated high academic standards and strong external support. For the March 2019 Licensure Examination for Teachers (LET), CCA ranked 10th among Higher Educational Institutions (HEIs) nationwide with more than 50 takers. The college has also recorded a 100% passing rate for first-takers in the September 2019 LET.

In 2018, CCA was the only HEI among its 30 partners to receive an Excellence Award from BPO giant Sutherland Global Services for its role in bridging the education-employment gap. The institution has collaborated on significant community projects, including the Expanded Executive Course for Barangay Leaders on System Delivery Support (BLeSDS), and was recognized for its role in supporting out-of-school youth in November 2024. This initiative was part of a larger partnership with Quezon City University, funded by the USAID-Education Development Center (EDC) GAIN Grant.

Regarding infrastructure, the college received a P50 million donation from the Philippine Amusement and Gaming Corporation (PAGCOR) in 2021 to fund the construction of an additional building. In a non-academic distinction, CCA participated in the inaugural Estudyante Esports tournament organized by Dark League Studious on February 24, 2025, which also launched the first UAAP Esports competition. Competing alongside De La Salle University, Our Lady of Fatima University, and Faith Colleges, CCA won ₱100,000 from the ₱1.6-million prize pool of Estudyante Esports.

== Academic departments ==
- Institute of Business and Management (IBM)
  - Bachelor of Science in Accountancy
  - Bachelor of Science in Accounting Information System
  - Bachelor of Science in Entrepreneurship
  - Bachelor of Science in Tourism Management
- Institute of Computing Studies and Library Information Science (ICSLIS)
  - Associate in Computer Technology (2-year degree program)
  - Bachelor of Science in Computer Science
  - Bachelor of Science in Information Systems
  - Bachelor of Library and Information Science
- Institute of Education, Arts and Sciences (IEAS)
  - Bachelor of Arts in English Language Studies
  - Bachelor of Science in Mathematics
  - Bachelor of Physical Education
  - Bachelor of Science in Psychology
  - Bachelor of Special Needs Education
  - Bachelor of Technical-Vocational Teacher Education Major in Food and Service Management

== Notable alumni ==
- Myrna Esguerra - Filipino beauty queen who represented the Philippines at Miss International 2025 and finished as 4th Runner-up.
