= Lingad =

Lingad is a Filipino surname of Kapampangan origin. Notable people with the surname include:

- Jose B. Lingad (1914-1980), Filipino lawyer and politician
- Emigdio Lingad (1953-2021), Filipino economist and politician
