= Pampanga's 1st congressional district =

Legislative district of the Philippines

- Constituency for the House of Representatives of the Philippines
- Boundary of Pampanga's 1st congressional district in Pampanga
- Location of Pampanga within the Philippines
- Province: Pampanga
- Region: Central Luzon
- Population: 880,360 (2020)
- Electorate: 416,188 (2022)
- Major settlements: 3 LGUs: Cities; Angeles City; Mabalacat; Municipalities; Magalang
- Area: 240.77 km^{2} (92.96 sq mi)

Current constituency
- Created: 1907
- Representative: Carmelo Lazatin Jr.
- Political party: PFP; KAMBILAN
- Congressional bloc: Majority

Pampanga's 1st congressional district is one of the four congressional districts of the Philippines in the province of Pampanga. It has been represented in the House of Representatives of the Philippines since 1916 and earlier in the Philippine Assembly from 1907 to 1916. The district consists of Angeles City the adjacent city of Mabalacat, and the municipality of Magalang. It is currently represented in the 20th Congress by Carmelo Lazatin Jr. of the Partido Federal ng Pilipinas and Kambilan.

Prior to its second dissolution in 1972, the district encompassed the western Pampanga municipalities of Angeles (which became a city in 1964), Bacolor, Floridablanca, Guagua, Lubao, Macabebe, Masantol, Porac, Santa Rita, and Sexmoan. Following the restoration of the Congress in 1987, it was redefined to encompass Angeles and neighboring northern Pampanga municipalities of Mabalacat and Magalang, a configuration that remains in effect to date.

== Representation history ==
#	Image	Member	Term of office		Legislature	Party	Electoral history	Constituent LGUs
#	Image	Member	Start	End	Legislature	Party	Electoral history	Constituent LGUs
=== Pampanga's 1st district for the Philippine Assembly ===
District created January 9, 1907.
1		Mónico R. Mercado	October 16, 1907	October 16, 1912	1st	Nacionalista	Elected in 1907.	1907–1912; Angeles, Bacolor, Floridablanca, Guagua, Lubao, Macabebe, Masantol, Porac, Santa Rita
1		Mónico R. Mercado	October 16, 1907	October 16, 1912	2nd	Nacionalista	Re-elected in 1909.	1907–1912; Angeles, Bacolor, Floridablanca, Guagua, Lubao, Macabebe, Masantol, Porac, Santa Rita
2		Eduardo Gutiérrez David	October 16, 1912	October 16, 1916	3rd	Progresista	Elected in 1912.	1912–1916; Angeles, Bacolor, Floridablanca, Guagua, Lubao, Macabebe, Masantol, Porac, Santa Rita, Sexmoan
=== Pampanga's 1st district for the House of Representatives of the Philippine Islands ===
(2)		Eduardo Gutiérrez David	October 16, 1916	June 3, 1919	4th	Progresista	Re-elected in 1916.	1916–1935; Angeles, Bacolor, Floridablanca, Guagua, Lubao, Macabebe, Masantol, Porac, Santa Rita, Sexmoan
3		Pablo Ángeles David	June 3, 1919	June 6, 1922	5th	Nacionalista	Elected in 1919.	1916–1935; Angeles, Bacolor, Floridablanca, Guagua, Lubao, Macabebe, Masantol, Porac, Santa Rita, Sexmoan
4		Pedro Valdez Liongson	June 6, 1922	June 5, 1928	6th	Nacionalista; Unipersonalista	Elected in 1922.	1916–1935; Angeles, Bacolor, Floridablanca, Guagua, Lubao, Macabebe, Masantol, Porac, Santa Rita, Sexmoan
4		Pedro Valdez Liongson	June 6, 1922	June 5, 1928	7th	Nacionalista; Consolidado	Re-elected in 1925.	1916–1935; Angeles, Bacolor, Floridablanca, Guagua, Lubao, Macabebe, Masantol, Porac, Santa Rita, Sexmoan
5		Fabian de la Paz	June 5, 1928	June 5, 1934	8th	Nacionalista; Consolidado	Elected in 1928.	1916–1935; Angeles, Bacolor, Floridablanca, Guagua, Lubao, Macabebe, Masantol, Porac, Santa Rita, Sexmoan
5		Fabian de la Paz	June 5, 1928	June 5, 1934	9th	Nacionalista; Consolidado	Re-elected in 1931.	1916–1935; Angeles, Bacolor, Floridablanca, Guagua, Lubao, Macabebe, Masantol, Porac, Santa Rita, Sexmoan
6		Eligio G. Lagman	June 5, 1934	July 16, 1935	10th	Nacionalista; Demócrata Pro-Independencia	Elected in 1934. Election annulled by the House election committee after an electoral protest.	1916–1935; Angeles, Bacolor, Floridablanca, Guagua, Lubao, Macabebe, Masantol, Porac, Santa Rita, Sexmoan
7		Máximo V. Dimson	July 16, 1935	September 16, 1935	10th	Nacionalista; Democrático	Declared winner of 1934 elections.	1916–1935; Angeles, Bacolor, Floridablanca, Guagua, Lubao, Macabebe, Masantol, Porac, Santa Rita, Sexmoan
#	Image	Member	Term of office		National Assembly	Party	Electoral history	Constituent LGUs
#	Image	Member	Start	End	National Assembly	Party	Electoral history	Constituent LGUs
=== Pampanga's 1st district for the National Assembly (Commonwealth of the Philippines) ===
(6)		Eligio G. Lagman	September 16, 1935	December 30, 1941	1st	Nacionalista; Demócrata Pro-Independencia	Elected in 1935.	1935–1941; Angeles, Bacolor, Floridablanca, Guagua, Lubao, Macabebe, Masantol, Porac, Santa Rita, Sexmoan
(6)		Eligio G. Lagman	September 16, 1935	December 30, 1941	2nd	Nacionalista	Re-elected in 1938.	1935–1941; Angeles, Bacolor, Floridablanca, Guagua, Lubao, Macabebe, Masantol, Porac, Santa Rita, Sexmoan
District dissolved into the two-seat Pampanga's at-large district for the National Assembly (Second Philippine Republic).
#	Image	Member	Term of office		Common wealth Congress	Party	Electoral history	Constituent LGUs
#	Image	Member	Start	End	Common wealth Congress	Party	Electoral history	Constituent LGUs
=== Pampanga's 1st district for the House of Representatives of the Commonwealth of the Philippines ===
District re-created May 24, 1945.
(6)		Eligio G. Lagman	June 9, 1945	May 25, 1946	1st	Nacionalista	Re-elected in 1941.	1945–1946; Angeles, Bacolor, Floridablanca, Guagua, Lubao, Macabebe, Masantol, Porac, Santa Rita, Sexmoan
#	Image	Member	Term of office		Congress	Party	Electoral history	Constituent LGUs
#	Image	Member	Start	End	Congress	Party	Electoral history	Constituent LGUs
=== Pampanga's 1st district for the House of Representatives of the Philippines ===
8		Amado Yuzon	May 25, 1946	December 30, 1949	1st	Democratic Alliance	Elected in 1946. Oath-taking deferred to April 30, 1948.	1946–1972; Angeles, Bacolor, Floridablanca, Guagua, Lubao, Macabebe, Masantol, Porac, Santa Rita, Sexmoan
9		Diosdado Macapagal	December 30, 1949	December 30, 1957	2nd	Liberal	Elected in 1949.	1946–1972; Angeles, Bacolor, Floridablanca, Guagua, Lubao, Macabebe, Masantol, Porac, Santa Rita, Sexmoan
9		Diosdado Macapagal	December 30, 1949	December 30, 1957	3rd	Liberal	Re-elected in 1953.	1946–1972; Angeles, Bacolor, Floridablanca, Guagua, Lubao, Macabebe, Masantol, Porac, Santa Rita, Sexmoan
10		Francisco G. Nepomuceno	December 30, 1957	November 10, 1959	4th	Liberal	Elected in 1957. Resigned on election as Pampanga governor.	1946–1972; Angeles, Bacolor, Floridablanca, Guagua, Lubao, Macabebe, Masantol, Porac, Santa Rita, Sexmoan
11		Juanita L. Nepomuceno	December 30, 1961	December 30, 1969	5th	Liberal	Elected in 1961.	1946–1972; Angeles, Bacolor, Floridablanca, Guagua, Lubao, Macabebe, Masantol, Porac, Santa Rita, Sexmoan
11		Juanita L. Nepomuceno	December 30, 1961	December 30, 1969	6th	Liberal	Re-elected in 1965.	1946–1972; Angeles, Bacolor, Floridablanca, Guagua, Lubao, Macabebe, Masantol, Porac, Santa Rita, Sexmoan
12		Jose B. Lingad	December 30, 1969	September 23, 1972	7th	Liberal	Elected in 1969. Removed from office after imposition of martial law.	1946–1972; Angeles, Bacolor, Floridablanca, Guagua, Lubao, Macabebe, Masantol, Porac, Santa Rita, Sexmoan
District dissolved into the sixteen-seat Region III's at-large district for the Interim Batasang Pambansa, followed by the four-seat Pampanga's at-large district for the Regular Batasang Pambansa.
District re-created February 2, 1987.
13		Carmelo F. Lazatin Sr.	June 30, 1987	June 30, 1998	8th	LnB	Elected in 1987.	1987–present Angeles City, Mabalacat, Magalang
13		Carmelo F. Lazatin Sr.	June 30, 1987	June 30, 1998	8th	PDP–Laban	Elected in 1987.	1987–present Angeles City, Mabalacat, Magalang
13		Carmelo F. Lazatin Sr.	June 30, 1987	June 30, 1998	9th	LDP	Re-elected in 1992.	1987–present Angeles City, Mabalacat, Magalang
13		Carmelo F. Lazatin Sr.	June 30, 1987	June 30, 1998	10th	Lakas	Re-elected in 1995.	1987–present Angeles City, Mabalacat, Magalang
14		Francis L. Nepomuceno	June 30, 1998	June 30, 2007	11th	LAMMP	Elected in 1998.	1987–present Angeles City, Mabalacat, Magalang
14		Francis L. Nepomuceno	June 30, 1998	June 30, 2007	12th	NPC	Re-elected in 2001.	1987–present Angeles City, Mabalacat, Magalang
14		Francis L. Nepomuceno	June 30, 1998	June 30, 2007	13th	NPC	Re-elected in 2004.	1987–present Angeles City, Mabalacat, Magalang
(13)		Carmelo F. Lazatin Sr.	June 30, 2007	June 30, 2013	14th	Lakas	Elected in 2007.	1987–present Angeles City, Mabalacat, Magalang
(13)		Carmelo F. Lazatin Sr.	June 30, 2007	June 30, 2013	15th	Lakas	Re-elected in 2010.	1987–present Angeles City, Mabalacat, Magalang
15		Joseller M. Guiao	June 30, 2013	June 30, 2016	16th	NUP (KAMBILAN)	Elected in 2013.	1987–present Angeles City, Mabalacat, Magalang
15		Joseller M. Guiao	June 30, 2013	June 30, 2016	16th	Liberal (KAMBILAN)	Elected in 2013.	1987–present Angeles City, Mabalacat, Magalang
16		Carmelo B. Lazatin II	June 30, 2016	June 30, 2025	17th	Lingap Lugud	Elected in 2016.	1987–present Angeles City, Mabalacat, Magalang
16		Carmelo B. Lazatin II	June 30, 2016	June 30, 2025	17th	PDP–Laban (KAMBILAN)	Elected in 2016.	1987–present Angeles City, Mabalacat, Magalang
16		Carmelo B. Lazatin II	June 30, 2016	June 30, 2025	18th	PDP–Laban (KAMBILAN)	Re-elected in 2019.	1987–present Angeles City, Mabalacat, Magalang
16		Carmelo B. Lazatin II	June 30, 2016	June 30, 2025	19th	Lakas (KAMBILAN)	Re-elected in 2022.	1987–present Angeles City, Mabalacat, Magalang
17		Carmelo Lazatin Jr.	June 30, 2025	Incumbent	20th	PFP (KAMBILAN)	Elected in 2025.	1987–present Angeles City, Mabalacat, Magalang

== Election results ==
=== 1965 ===
1965 Philippine House of Representatives election in Pampanga's 1st district
Party	Candidate	Votes	%
Liberal	Juanita Nepomuceno (incumbent)	51,673	57.01
Liberal	Anastacio Bernal	15,280	16.86
Nacionalista	Carlos Sandico Jr.	13,904	15.34
Independent	Juan Cancio	9,631	10.63
Liberal	Gil Sanchez	142	0.16
Liberal (Independent)	Jose Ocampo	9	0.01
Free Party	Ricardo Quiambao	5	0.01
Total votes		90,644	100.00
Liberal hold			

=== 1992 ===
1992 Philippine House of Representatives election in Pampanga's 1st district
Candidate	Party	Votes	%
Carmelo Lazatin Sr. (incumbent)	Laban ng Demokratikong Pilipino	66,474	73.17
Wilfredo Halili	Nationalist People's Coalition	12,002	13.21
Adelaido Rivera	Koalisyong Pambansa	11,984	13.19
Rogelio Tiglao	Kilusang Bagong Lipunan	210	0.23
Roland Pay	People's Reform Party	162	0.18
Benjamin Villanueva	Independent	18	0.02
Total		90,850	100.00
Source: Commission on Elections

=== 1995 ===
1995 Philippine House of Representatives election in Pampanga's 1st district
Candidate	Party	Votes	%
Carmelo Lazatin Sr. (incumbent)	Lakas–NUCD–UMDP	79,399	70.03
Catalino Domingo	Nacionalista Party	25,950	22.89
Eller Torres	Nationalist People's Coalition	7,839	6.91
Allan Villanueva	Independent	184	0.16
Total		113,372	100.00
Source: Commission on Elections

=== 1998 ===
1998 Philippine House of Representatives election in Pampanga's 1st district
Candidate	Party	Votes	%
Francis Nepomuceno	Laban ng Makabayang Masang Pilipino	71,802	43.73
Edgardo Pamintuan Sr.	Lakas–NUCD–UMDP	62,237	37.91
Reynaldo Guiao	Independent	28,834	17.56
Eliseo Siopangco	Independent	741	0.45
Florante Quizon	Partido para sa Demokratikong Reporma	574	0.35
Total		164,188	100.00
Source: Commission on Elections

=== 2007 ===
2007 Philippine House of Representatives election in Pampanga's 1st district
Party	Candidate	Votes	%
Lakas	Carmelo Lazatin Sr.	83,249	
NPC	Gerard Nepomuceno	66,779	
Independent	Luisito Bacani	848	
Total votes			
Lakas gain from NPC			

=== 2010 ===
2010 Philippine House of Representatives election in Pampanga's 1st district
Party	Candidate	Votes	%
Lakas–Kampi	Carmelo Lazatin Sr. (incumbent)	156,619	79.34
NPC	Ares Yabut	37,121	18.80
Independent	Luisito Bacani	3,670	1.86
Valid ballots		197,410	88.79
Invalid or blank votes		24,924	11.21
Total votes		222,334	100.00
Lakas–Kampi hold			

=== 2013 ===
2013 Philippine House of Representatives election in Pampanga's 1st district
Party	Candidate	Votes	%
KAMBILAN	Yeng Guiao	96,433	51.82
NPC	Francis Nepomuceno	73,100	39.28
Margin of victory		23,333	12.54%
Invalid or blank votes		16,551	8.89
Total votes		186,084	100.00
KAMBILAN gain from Lakas			

=== 2016 ===
2016 Philippine House of Representatives election in Pampanga's 1st district
Party	Candidate	Votes	%
Lingap Lugud	Carmelo "Jon-Jon" Lazatin II	127,762	
Liberal	Yeng Guiao	106,086	
Independent	Edwin Bacay	1,828	
Independent	Juan Pagaran	1,203	
Invalid or blank votes		31,388	
Total votes		268,267	
Lingap Lugud gain from KAMBILAN			

=== 2019 ===
2019 Philippine House of Representatives election in Pampanga's 1st district
Party	Candidate	Votes	%
PDP–Laban	Carmelo "Jon-Jon" Lazatin II (incumbent)	152,169	
KAMBILAN	Yeng Guiao	107,078	
Independent	Bernadette David	3,622	
Total votes			
PDP–Laban hold			

=== 2022 ===
2022 Philippine House of Representatives election in Pampanga's 1st district
Party	Candidate	Votes	%
PDP–Laban	Carmelo "Jon-Jon" Lazatin II (incumbent)	222,096	100.00
Total votes		222,096	100.00
PDP–Laban hold			

=== 2025 ===
2025 Philippine House of Representatives election in Pampanga's 1st district
Candidate	Party	Votes	%
Carmelo Lazatin Jr.	Partido Federal ng Pilipinas	262,517	100.00
Total		262,517	100.00
Registered voters/turnout		441,218	–
Partido Federal ng Pilipinas gain from Lakas–CMD			
Source: Commission on Elections

== See also ==
- Legislative districts of Pampanga
