= Pablo Ángeles David =

Filipino politician (1889–1965)

The Honorable Pablo Ángeles David
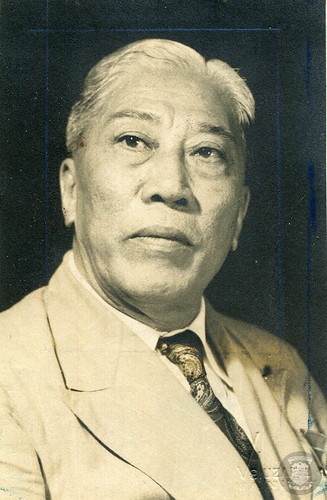
- Official portrait, 1948

Senator of the Philippines
- In office December 30, 1947 – December 30, 1953

Governor of Pampanga
- In office 1945 – December 30, 1947
- Preceded by: Gerardo Limlingan
- Succeeded by: Jose B. Lingad
- In office 1931–1937
- Preceded by: Eligio Lagman
- Succeeded by: Sotero Baluyut
- In office 1917
- Preceded by: Honorio Ventura
- Succeeded by: Honorio Ventura

Member of the House of Representatives of the Philippine Islands from Pampanga's 1st district
- In office June 3, 1919 – June 6, 1922
- Preceded by: Eduardo G. David
- Succeeded by: Pedro V. Liongson

Member of the Pampanga Provincial Board
- In office 1916–1919

Personal details
- Born: August 17, 1889 Bacolor, Pampanga, Captaincy General of the Philippines
- Died: May 16, 1965 (aged 75) Quezon City, Philippines
- Party: Liberal (1947–1965)
- Other political affiliations: Nacionalista (1916–1947)
- Education: Liceo de Manila (now Manila Central University); Escuela de Derecho (now Manila Law College Foundation)
- Occupation: Magistrate; statesman; politician
- Known for: Champion of the Poor Against Communist, Landowner and Military Abuses "He entered politics a very wealthy man and sold everything he had to spend his substance to save those caught in the cross-fire of Communist Insurrection."
- Nickname: Ambo

Pablo "Ambo" Ángeles David (Bacolor, August 17, 1889 - May 16, 1965) was a Filipino magistrate and statesman. During his career, he became a Judge, a member of the Philippine House of Representatives, Governor of Pampanga and a member of the senate of the Philippines.

== Early life and education ==
Angeles David was born in the town of Bacolor, Philippines in the house of Carlos de los Angeles y de los Reyes (of Brgy. San Vicente) and Ceferina David y Mesina (of Brgy. San Isidro) on August 17, 1889.

From 1900 to 1901, he studied at the private school ran by Modesto Joaquin, a former Katipunero whose other students would later grow as famous personalities like Justice Jose Gutierrez David, Nicolas Dayrit and Benigno Aquino, Sr.. David Angeles earned the degree of Bachelor of Arts in 1906 at Liceo de Manila and the degree in law in 1909 at Escuela de Derecho, the nation's leading law school. In 1910, at the age of 20, he passed the Philippine Bar Examination and became the youngest person to qualify the Philippine Bar Examination. Being considered too young, he had to wait another year to take his oath of law.

== Political career ==
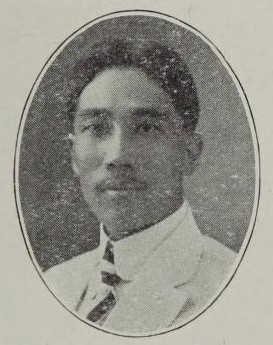
Ángeles David as member of the House of Representatives, c. 1921

Angeles David chose to serve his province, Pampanga. From 1911 to 1912, he was appointed as Justice of the Peace for Sasmuan, Santa Rita and his hometown of Bacolor. From 1913-1915, he served as Deputy Provincial Fiscal. He was elected for three years as a provincial councilor in 1916 and later in 1918 became chairman of the Census Board. In 1919 he was elected to the House of Representatives for the 1st District of Pampanga.

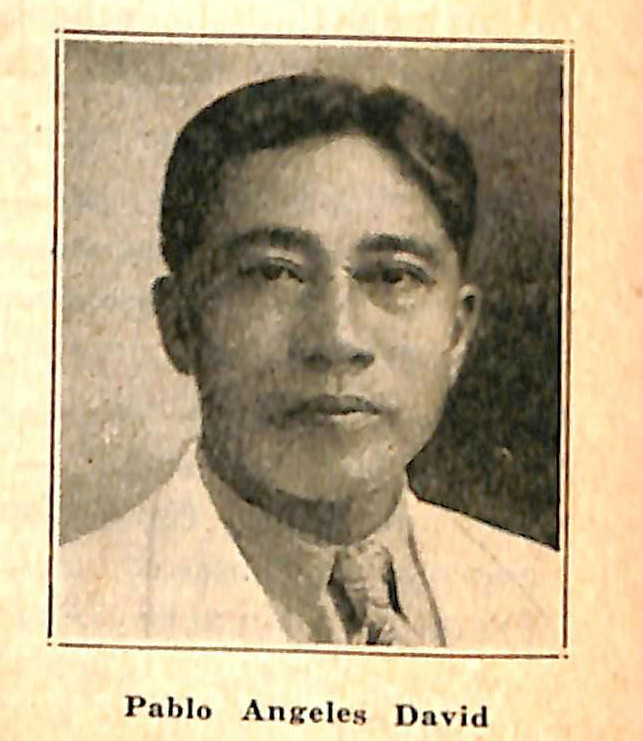
Ángeles David in 1939

David Angeles became acting governor of Pampanga at the age of 27 when Honorio Ventura was appointed as Secretary of the Interior, being the number one board member. He was elected as governor in 1931 and was re-elected in 1934. After the Liberation from the Japanese in World War II, he re-established the provincial government, driving away the Hukbalahap ("Hukbo ng Bayan Laban sa Hapon") rebels who occupied the provincial capitol and took the helm of running the affairs of Pampanga with the blessing of the national government. In 1946, he was elected as the provincial governor and served the position until 1947.

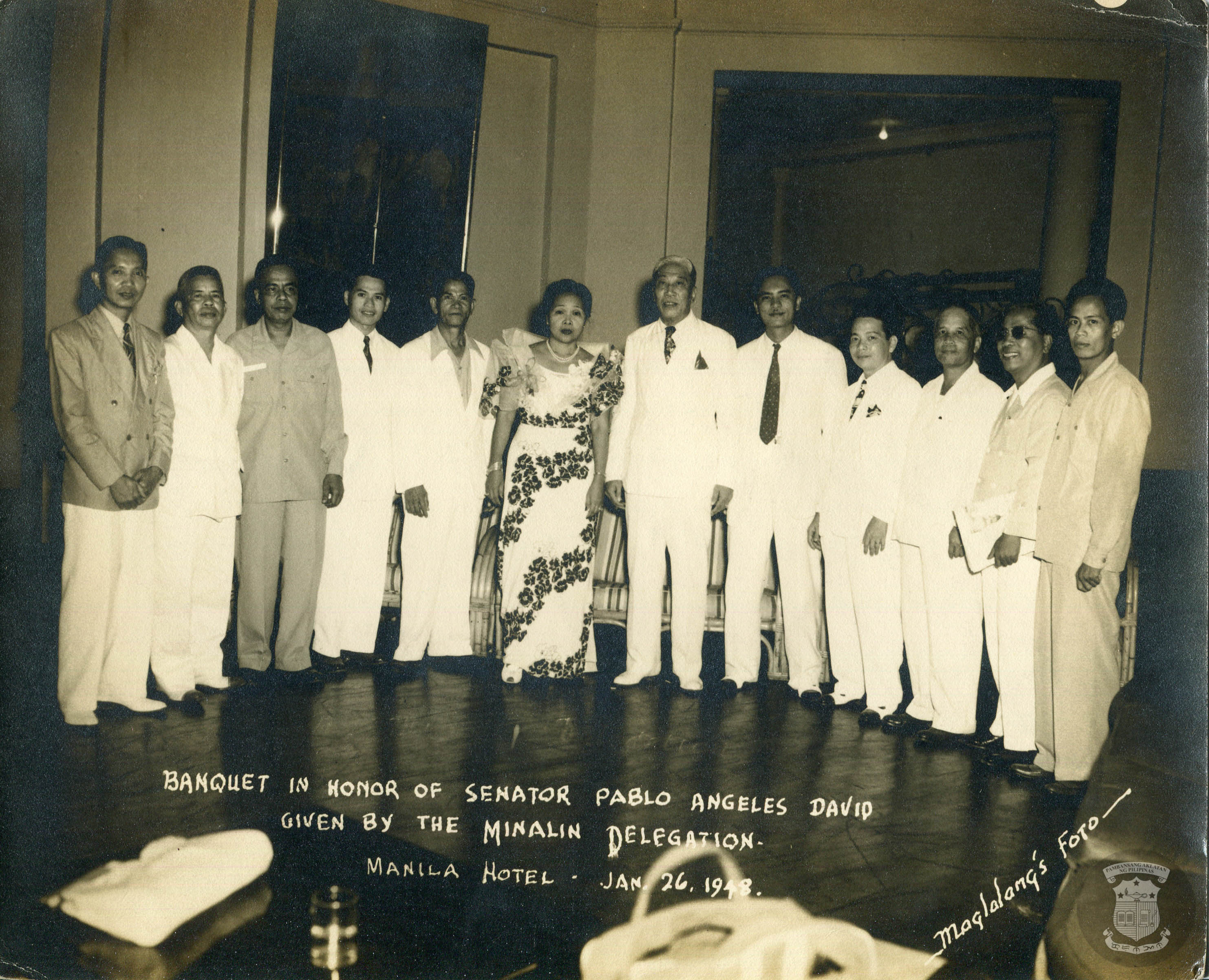
Ángeles David (first from right) at the Manila Hotel on January 26, 1948

In 1947 he was elected to the Philippine Senate where he served till 1953. As a senator he was known for his fiery speeches. One such example is of 1950 expose when he contested President President Elpidio Quirino's announcement that the Hukbalahap rebels had already been decimated. He then revealed that a massacre occurred in his hometown Bacolor which was perpetrated by members of the Philippine Constabulary forces in retaliation for the death of one of their commanders.

== See also ==
- Pampanga
- Bacolor, Pampanga
- Legislative districts of Pampanga
- Congress of the Philippines
- Senate of the Philippines
