= Juanita Nepomuceno =

Filipino lawyer and politician (1914–2000)

The Honorable Juanita Nepomuceno
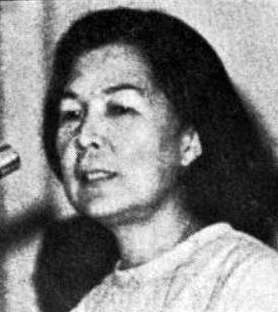
- Nepomuceno in 1967

Mambabatas Pambansa (Assemblyman) from Pampanga
- In office June 30, 1984 – March 25, 1986

26th Governor of Pampanga
- In office April 11, 1976 – March 3, 1980
- Vice Governor: Vacant
- Preceded by: Brigido Valencia
- Succeeded by: Estelito Mendoza

Member of the House of Representatives from Pampanga's 1st District
- In office December 30, 1961 – December 30, 1969
- Preceded by: Francisco Nepomuceno
- Succeeded by: Jose B. Lingad

Personal details
- Born: Juanita Cuyugan Lumanlan; August 21, 1914 Porac, Pampanga, Philippine Islands
- Died: August 13, 2000 (aged 85) Angeles City, Philippines
- Party: Liberal (1961–2000)
- Other political affiliations: UNIDO (1984–1986)
- Spouse: Francisco Nepomuceno (m. 1940; died 1997)
- Children: 8, including Francis
- Relatives: Bryan Matthew Nepomuceno (grandson)
- Education: University of Santo Tomas; Philippine Law School (LL.B.)
- Occupation: Politician
- Profession: Lawyer

Juanita Lumanlan Nepomuceno (born Juanita Cuyugan Lumanlan; August 21, 1914 – August 13, 2000), also known colloquially as "Apung Saning", was a Filipino lawyer and politician who served as governor of Pampanga from 1976 to 1980. She represented the first district of Pampanga at the House of Representatives of the Philippines from 1961 to 1969. She also represented Pampanga at the Regular Batasang Pambansa from 1984 to 1986.

== Early life and education ==
Nepomuceno was born on August 21, 1914 in Porac, to Bonifacio Lumanlan and Potenciana Cuyugan. She attended Mabalacat Primary School and Porac Elementary School for her elementary education. She attended Sacred Heart Academy in Santa Rita for her high school education. She studied University of Santo Tomas for pre-law course. She later studied law in Philippine Law School. In 1939, Nepomuceno passed the bar examinations.

== Political career ==
Nepomuceno started her career in politics as representative in Pampanga's first district after succeeding her husband.

During the Marcos era, Nepomuceno became governor of Pampanga from 1976 to 1980.

In 1984, Nepomuceno became a member of the Regular Batasang Pambansa along with Aber Canlas, Rafael Lazatin and Emigdio Lingad.

== Personal life ==
On June 1, 1940, Nepomuceno was married to Francisco Nepomuceno, who also served as governor of Pampanga and representative of the first district of Pampanga and had eight children including, Francis Nepomuceno who served as mayor of Angeles City and former congressman. Nepomuceno also had a brother, Belarmino Cuyugan, who served as mayor of Porac from 1932 to 1935.

== Death ==
Nepomuceno died on August 13, 2000 in Angeles City.

Political offices
Preceded by Brigido Valencia	Governor of Pampanga; 1976–1980	Succeeded by Estelito Mendoza
House of Representatives of the Philippines
Preceded by Francisco Nepomuceno	Representative of 1st District of Pampanga; 1961–1969	Succeeded by Jose B. Lingad
