= Pampanga High School =

Public high school in Pampanga, Philippines

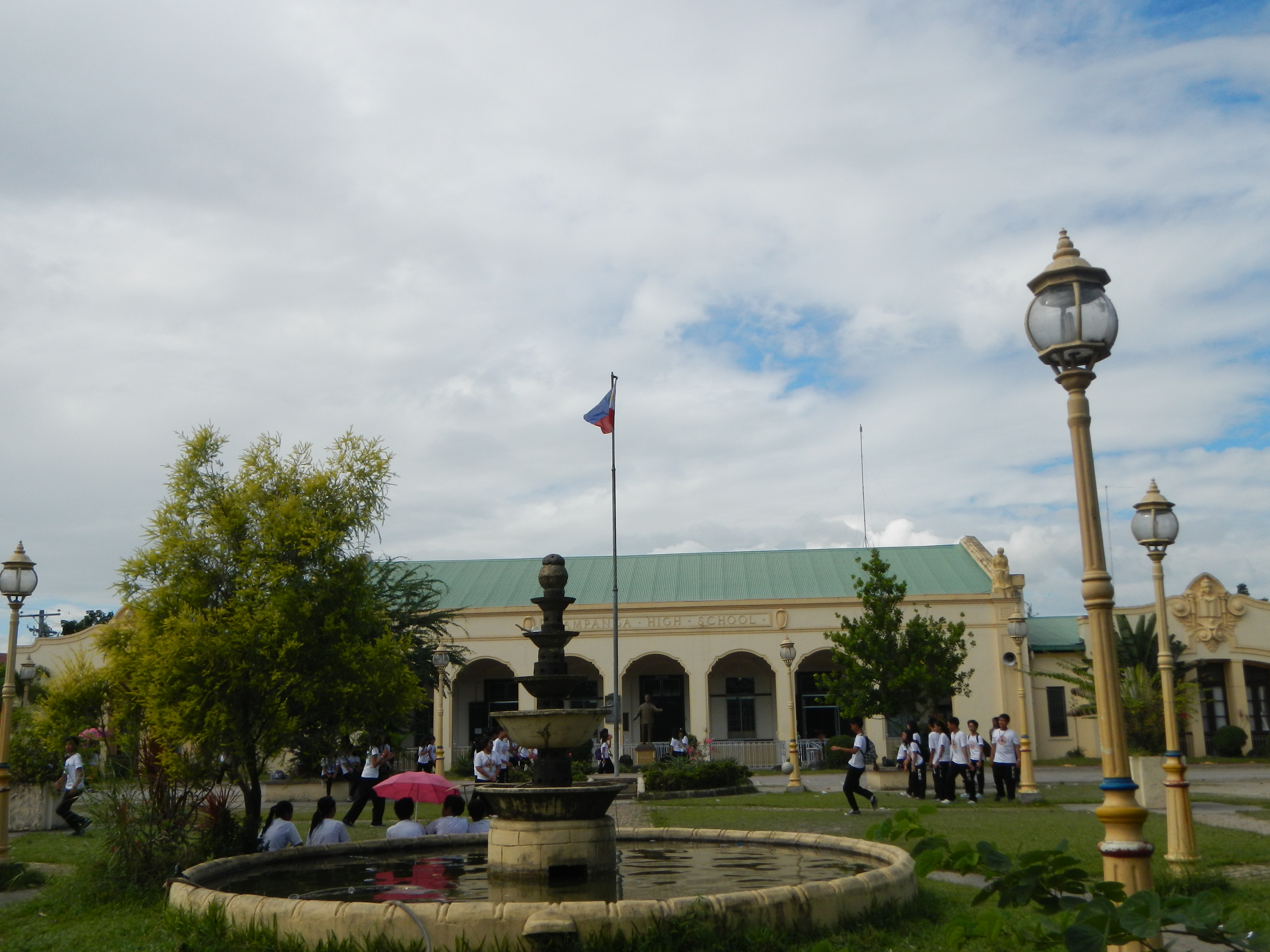
- Frontage

Location
- City of San Fernando, Pampanga; Philippines; 15°01′53″N 120°41′16″E

Information
- Former name: Jose Abad Santos High School
- Type: National High School (public)
- Established: 1902
- Principal: Ms. Marilen A. Calma
- Staff: 60
- Faculty: 480
- Grades: 7 to 12
- Enrolment: 9,424 students (as of Oct 05, 2026) (S.Y. 2026-2027)
  - Grade 7: 1,143
  - Grade 8: 1,768
  - Grade 9: 1,763
  - Grade 10: 1,326
  - Grade 11: 1,701
  - Grade 12: 1,665
- Campus: High School Blvd., Lourdes, City of San Fernando, Pampanga, Philippines. Area: 5.45 ha (13.5 acres)
- Colors: Yellow, white
- Slogan: Home/School of Character and Excellence
- Nickname: PHSians
- Newspaper: Pampangan, Sinukuan
- Affiliation: Department of Education
- Website: pampangahigh.school
- Last updated: October 13, 2026

Pampanga National High School (also known as Pampanga High School, or PHS) is a high school in San Fernando, Pampanga, Philippines.

It was formerly known as Jose Abad Santos High School. The current main building was completed in 1935, follows Standard Plan No. 20 of Gabaldon schoolhouses, and is being restored as part of the Heritage Schoolhouse Restoration Program of the Department of Education.

As of 2024, the school offers academic course strands of Accountancy, Business and Management (ABM), General Academic Strand (GAS), Humanities and Social Sciences (HUMSS), and Science, Technology, Engineering, and Mathematics Strand (STEM), plus vocational courses in Beauty/Nail Care, Hairdressing, and Wellness Massage.

== History ==
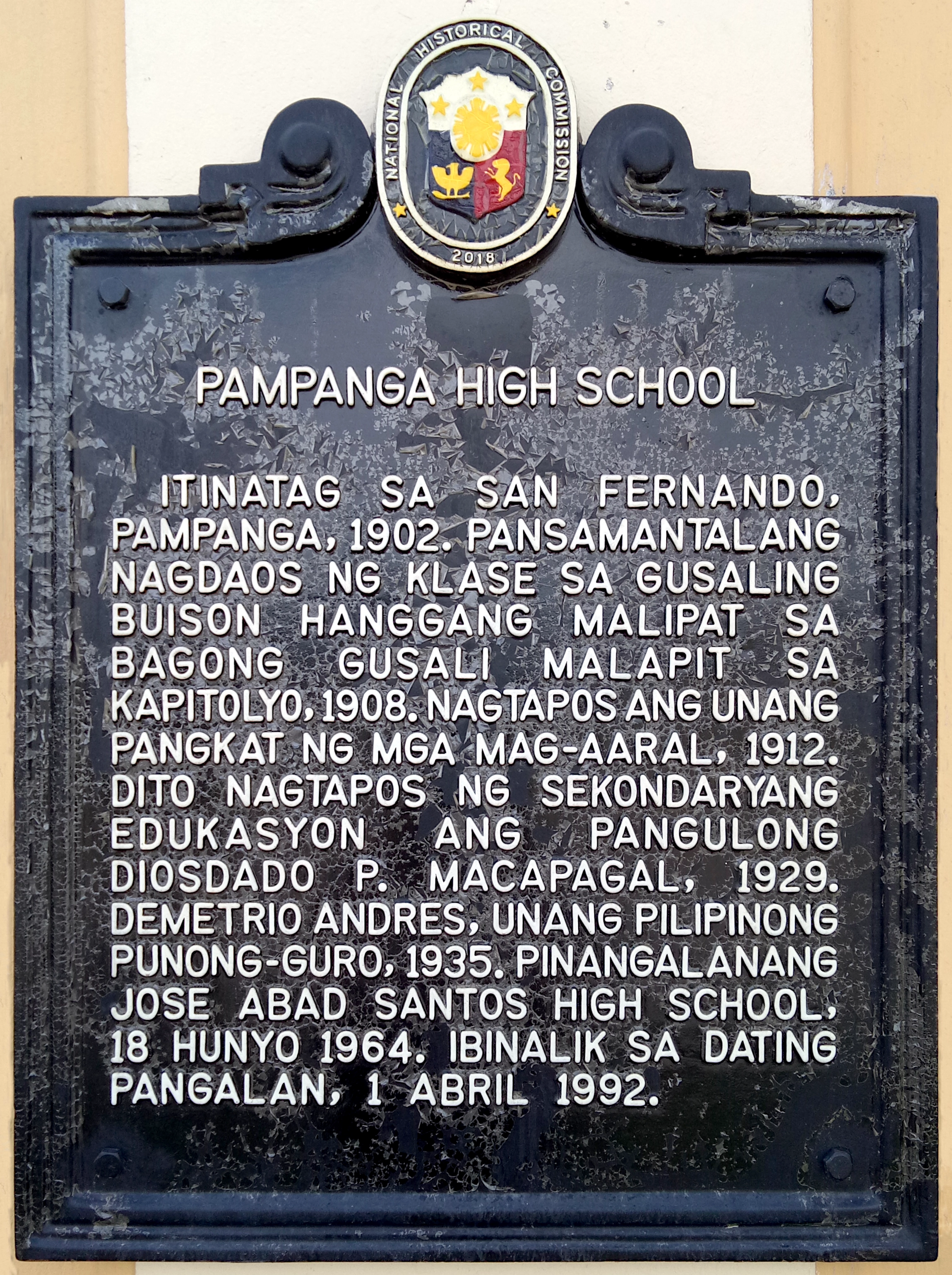
National historical marker installed in 2018

Following the establishment of the second Philippine Commission, the Department of Public Instruction established public education in Pampanga. Almost 600 American teachers, commonly known as the Thomasites, arrived in the Philippines in 1901, of which 25 were assigned to 19 towns of Pampanga.

The Pampanga High School began in 1908, with classes being held in a large house in downtown San Fernando known then as the "Buison Building" or Eusebio Residence. The school was later moved to a building near the Provincial Capitol, in barrio Santo Nino, to accommodate more students. The site was completed shortly after 1910 and served as the main building until 1935, after which it became an annex of the school.

In 1937 classes were once again moved to new facilities along Teopaco Street, now known as High School Boulevard. The building Provincial Capitol was converted into a military hospital and later became the San Fernando Branch of the University of the Philippines.

During its foundational years, the schools were overseen by American educators. In 1935, the final American was succeeded by Demetrio Andres. During the mid-1960s, the school population exceeded 4000 pupils, as students from nearby towns began to enroll. Several sports programs were established in Track and Field, Basketball, Volleyball, Soccer, and Baseball. The school newspaper, The Pampangan, received national recognition during this period, winning several medals. For example, in 1960, the school won a gold medal in Sportswriting and two bronze medals.

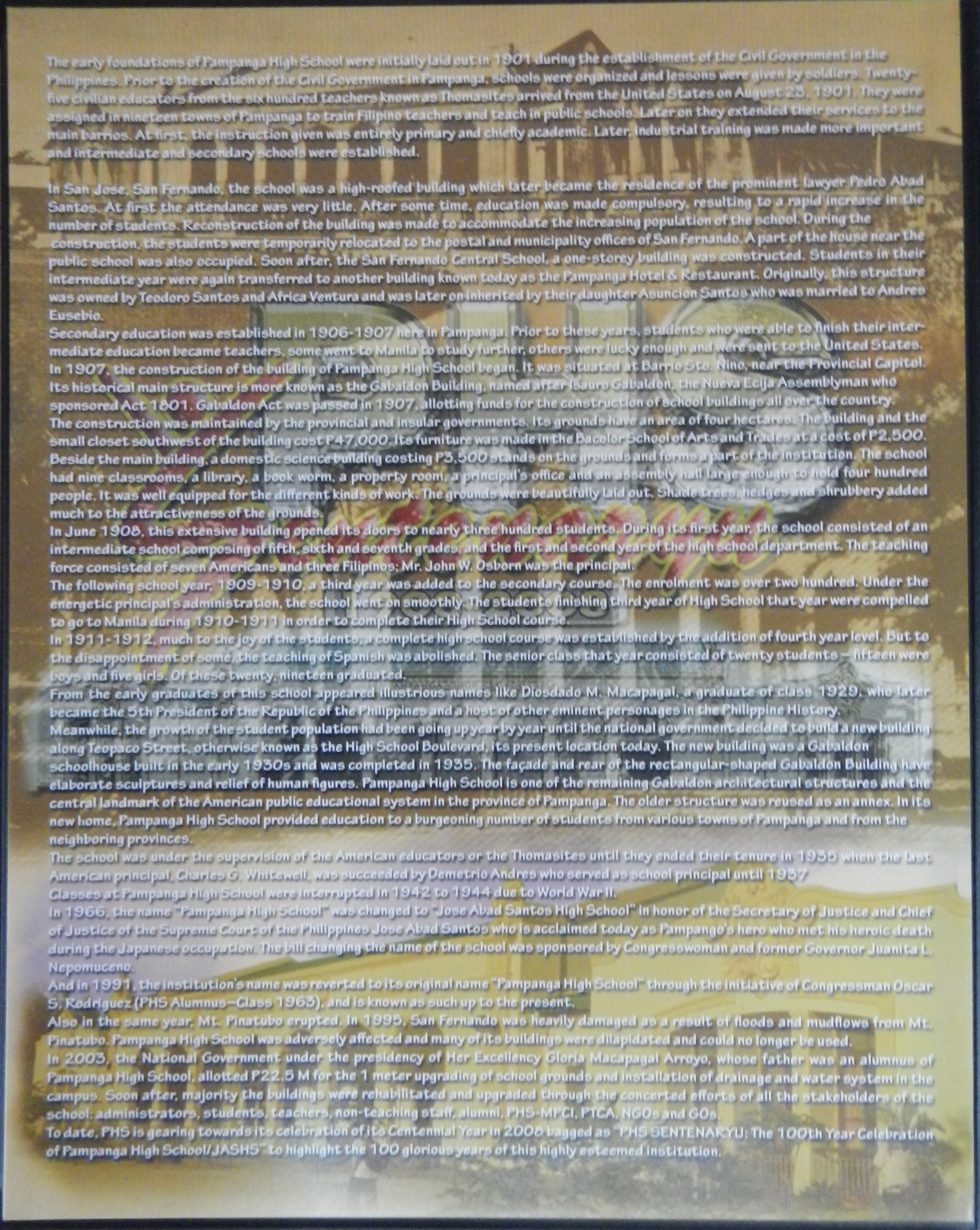
History (from PHS Sentenaryu Book, February 11–15, 2008)

The 1991 eruption of Mount Pinatubo severely damaged school facilities, leading to regular closures and teacher absence.

As of 2002, the school consisted of 77 buildings and thatched huts with 180 rooms and had over 9,000 students. There were two toilets on site.

School principal Imelda Macaspac secured a P5 million annual outlay from the Department of Education to cover bills and raised donations from local businesses, the Japan International Cooperation Agency, and school alumni including P33.5 million in total from President Macapagal-Arroyo.

By 2007, the site had five toilets, a canteen, a security force, two computer laboratories with around 50 devices, an automotive shop, a culinary arts kitchen, and a beauty salon.

In 2010, the student government installed ID Scanners to monitor school attendance.

== Uniform ==
At the Junior and Senior High School, the boys’ uniform is a plain white polo shirt with the school monogram/logo, black pants, and black shoes with white socks. The girls’ uniform is a plain white blouse with a monogram/logo, an orange pleated skirt (2-3 inches below the knee), and black shoes with white socks. Girls in the Senior school should also wear a yellow necktie. All students are also required to wear ID badges whenever they are on school premises.

== Notable alumni ==
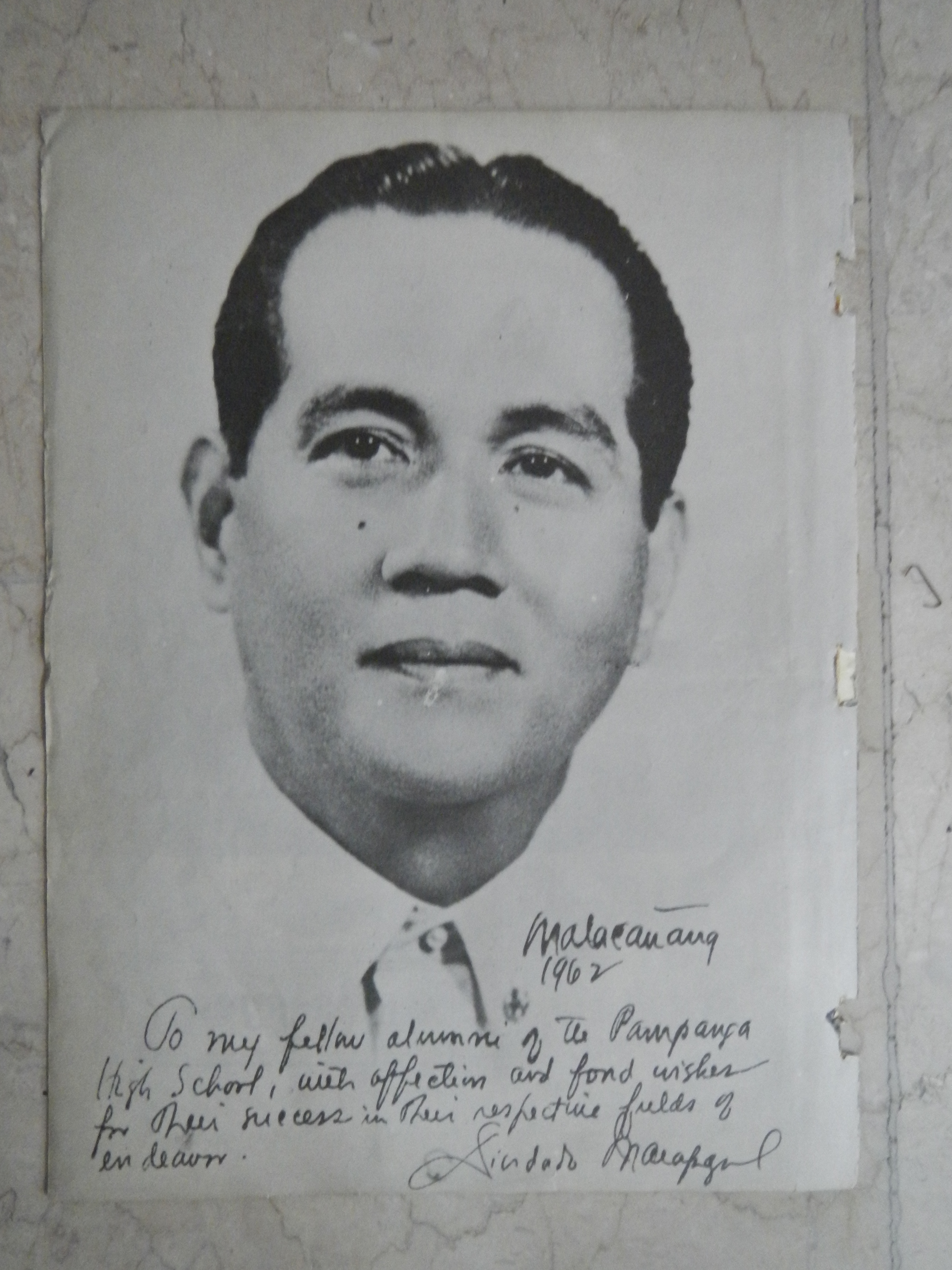
Diosdado Macapagal handwriting note and signature (from the PHS 1912-1962 Year Book)

- Diosdado P. Macapagal, former president of the Philippines from Dec 30, 1961 until Dec 30, 1965
- Jose B. Lingad, former governor of Pampanga
- Hugo Gutierrez Jr., Associate Justice of the Supreme Court of the Philippines from May 14, 1982, until March 31, 1993
- Rafael Lazatin, former governor of Pampanga and mayor of Angeles City.
- Marcos G. Soliman, former military officer
- Oscar Samson Rodriguez, former mayor of San Fernando, Pampanga
- Amado Yuzon, writer and politician
- Vilma Caluag, current mayor of San Fernando, Pampanga

== Gallery ==
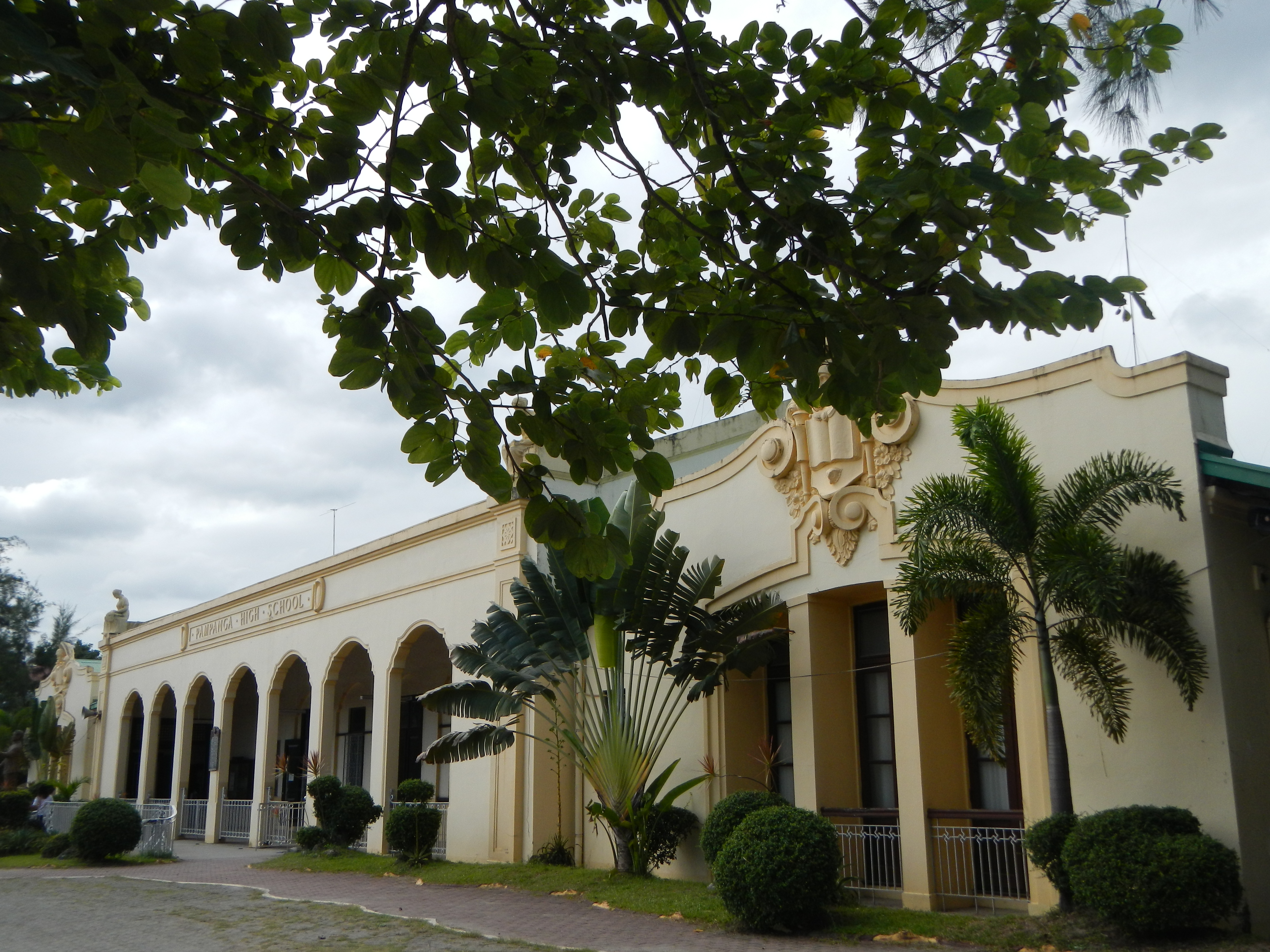
Façade of the School

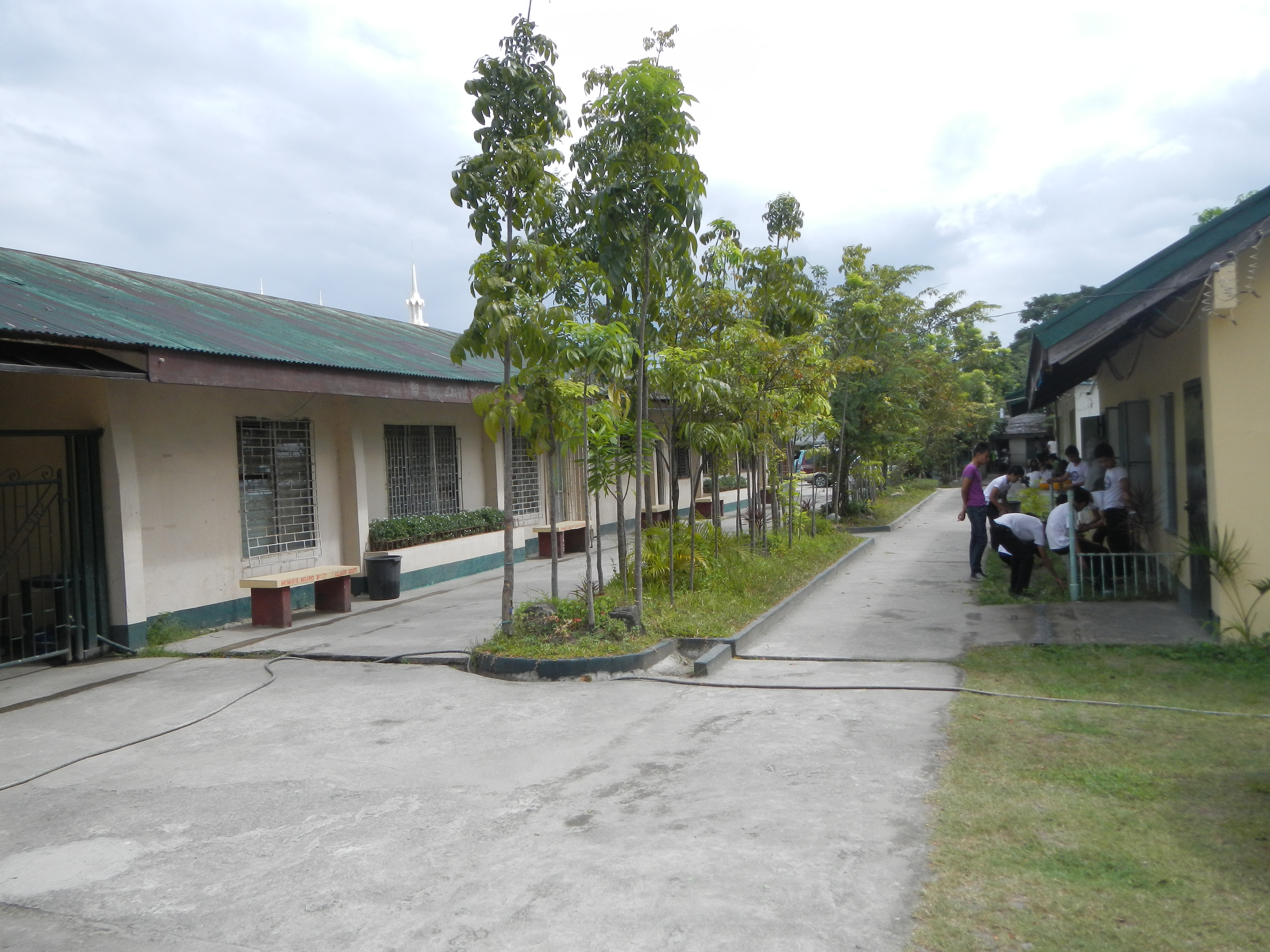
View of the School buildings

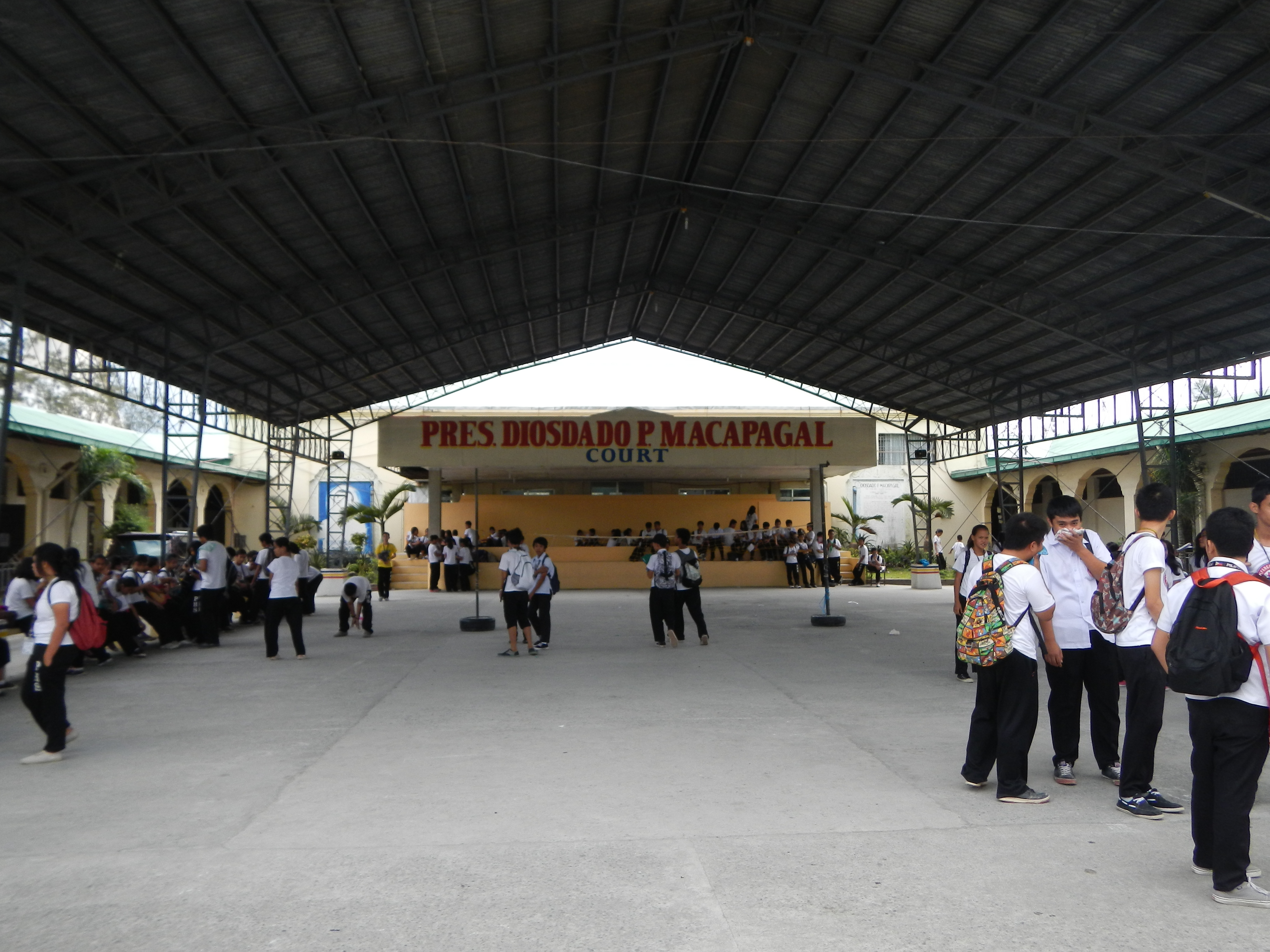
Diosdado Macapagal Court

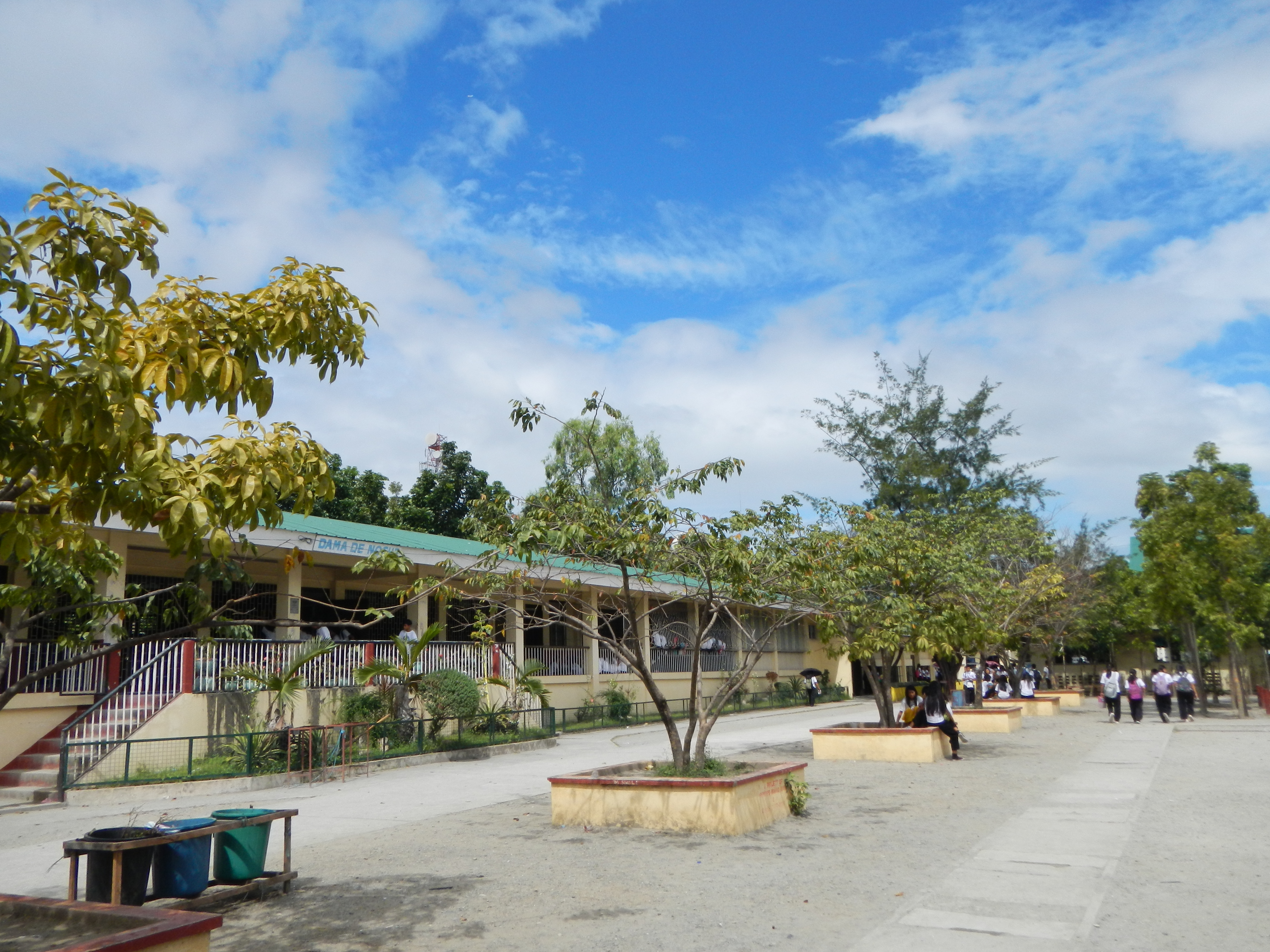
Dama de Noche building

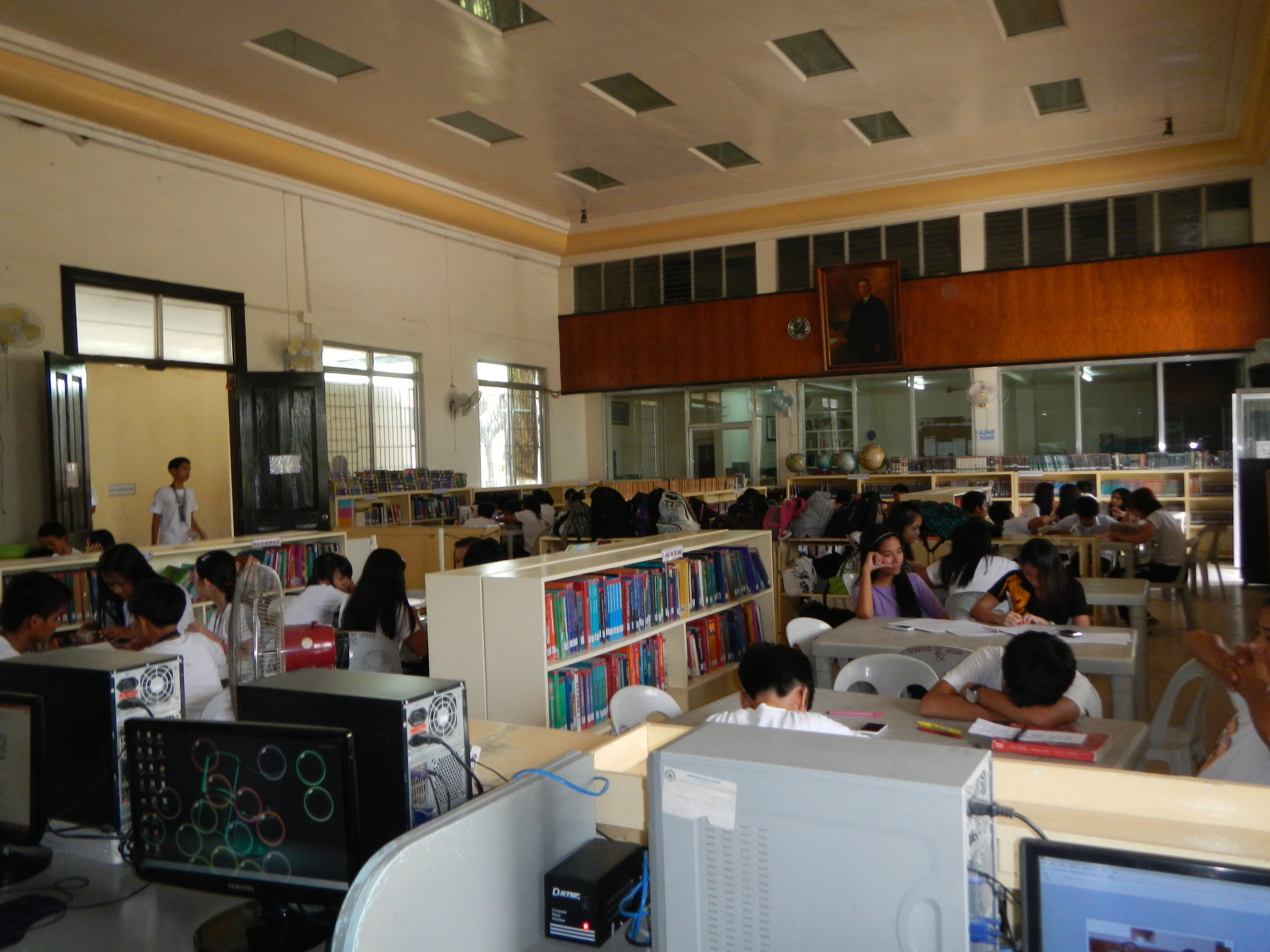
Library
