= Rafael Lazatin =

Filipino politician and businessman (1906–1993)

The Honorable Rafael Lazatin
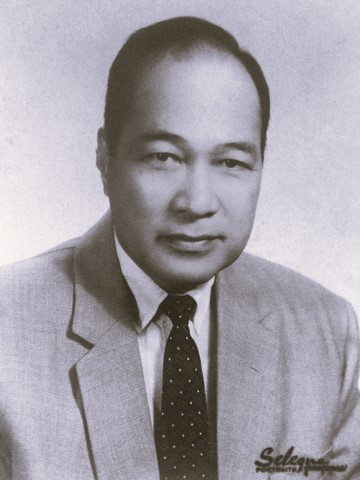

Mambabatas Pambansa (Assemblyman) from Pampanga
- In office June 30, 1984 – March 25, 1986

21st & 27th Mayor of Angeles City
- In office 1972–1979
- Preceded by: Eugenio Suarez
- Succeeded by: Francisco Nepomuceno
- In office 1946–1947
- Preceded by: Ricardo Canlas
- Succeeded by: Vicente Henson

23rd Governor of Pampanga
- In office December 30, 1951 – December 30, 1959
- Preceded by: Jose B. Lingad
- Succeeded by: Francisco Nepomuceno

Personal details
- Born: Rafael Antonio Lacsamana Lazatin; November 7, 1906 Angeles, Pampanga, Philippine Islands
- Died: November 20, 1993 (aged 87) Angeles City, Philippines
- Party: Nacionalista (1951–1993)
- Other political affiliations: UNIDO (1984–1986)
- Spouse: Loreto Feliciano
- Children: Francisco; Carmelo
- Relatives: Lazatin family
- Education: Jose Rizal College (BS)

Rafael Antonio Lacsamana Lazatin (November 7, 1906 – November 20, 1993), also known colloquially as "Apung Feleng", was a Filipino politician and businessman. He served as municipal mayor of Angeles in 1946, then Governor of Pampanga from 1951 to 1959, and City Mayor of Angeles from 1972 to 1980. He was also an opposition assemblyman in the Batasang Pambansa from 1984 to 1986 during the Marcos era.

== Early years ==
Lazatin was born on November 7, 1906 in the then-municipality of Angeles in Pampanga. He was the seventh child of Trinidad Lazatín y de Ocampo and Leoncia Lacsamana y Ong Ing Co, both from Mexico. In his early education, he finished primary at Angeles Elementary School and secondary at Pampanga High School. He became municipal mayor of Angeles, Pampanga in June 1946 and graduated with a Bachelor of Science in Commerce at Jose Rizal College in 1950.

== Political career ==
In 1951 general elections, Lazatin as a member of the Nacionalista Party has won as governor against Jose B. Lingad of the Liberal Party.

After his term as governor, Lazatin was elected and became mayor of Angeles City.

In 1984, Lazatin became member of the Batasang Pambansa along with Aber Canlas, Emigdio Lingad and Juanita Nepomuceno.

== Personal life ==
Lazatin was married to Loreto Feliciano and has two children including Carmelo Lazatin Sr., a former congressman and also mayor of Angeles City from 1998 to 2007. He died on November 20, 1993.

Political offices
Preceded by Eugenio Suarez	Mayor of Angeles City; 1972–1979	Succeeded by Francisco Nepomuceno
Preceded by Jose B. Lingad	Governor of Pampanga; 1951–1959	Succeeded by Francisco Nepomuceno
Preceded by Ricardo Canlas	Mayor of Angeles, Pampanga; 1946–1947	Succeeded by Vicente Henson
