= Francis Nepomuceno =

Filipino politician (born 1951)

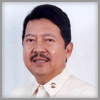
- Official portrait, 2004

32nd Mayor of Angeles City
- In office June 30, 2007 – June 30, 2010
- Vice Mayor: Vicky Vega-Cabigting
- Preceded by: Carmelo Lazatin Sr.
- Succeeded by: Edgardo Pamintuan Sr.

Member of the House of Representatives from Pampanga's 1st district
- In office June 30, 1998 – June 30, 2007
- Preceded by: Carmelo Lazatin Sr.
- Succeeded by: Carmelo Lazatin Sr.

Vice Mayor of Angeles City
- In office June 30, 1995 – June 30, 1998
- Mayor: Edgardo Pamintuan Sr.
- Preceded by: Ricardo Zalamea
- Succeeded by: Ricardo Zalamea

Personal details
- Born: Francis Lumanlan Nepomuceno; May 27, 1951 (age 75) Sampaloc, Manila, Philippines
- Party: NPC (1995–present)
- Other political affiliations: LAMMP (1998–2001)
- Spouse: Regina de Leon
- Parents: Francisco Nepomuceno (father); Juanita Nepomuceno (mother)
- Relatives: Bryan Matthew Nepomuceno (nephew)
- Education: Holy Angel University (BS); Sophia University

Francis "Blueboy" Lumanlan Nepomuceno (born May 27, 1951) is a Filipino politician who served as 32nd mayor of Angeles City from 2007 to 2010. He represented the Pampanga's first district from 1998 to 2007. He also served as vice mayor of Angeles City from 1995 to 1998.

== Early life and education ==
Nepomuceno was born on May 27, 1951 at University of Santo Tomas Hospital in Sampaloc, Manila to Francisco Nepomuceno and Juanita Nepomuceno. He studied commerce in Holy Angel University and foreign studies in Sophia University.

== Political career ==
=== Vice Mayor of Angeles City (1995–1998) ===
Nepomuceno became a vice mayor of Angeles City in 1995.

=== House of Representatives (1998–2007) ===
Nepomuceno represented the Pampanga's first district from 1998 to 2007.

=== Mayor of Angeles City (2007–2010) ===
Nepomuceno was elected mayor of Angeles City from 2007 to 2010. In the 2010 elections, Nepomuceno lost reelection to Edgardo Pamintuan.

=== 2013 House of Representatives bid ===
In the 2013 elections, Nepomuceno ran again as representative of the first district of Pampanga but lost to Yeng Guiao and garnered only 73,100 votes.

Political offices
Preceded by Carmelo Lazatin Sr.	Mayor of Angeles City; 2007–2010	Succeeded by Edgardo Pamintuan Sr.
Preceded by Ricardo Zalamea	Vice Mayor of Angeles City; 1995–1998	Succeeded by Ricardo Zalamea
House of Representatives of the Philippines
Preceded by Carmelo Lazatin Sr.	Representative of 1st District of Pampanga; 1998–2007	Succeeded by Carmelo Lazatin Sr.
