= Francisco Nepomuceno =

Filipino politician (1916–1997)

The Honorable Francisco Nepomuceno
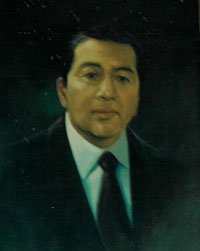
- Official portrait

28th Mayor of Angeles City
- In office 1980–1987
- Preceded by: Rafael Lazatin
- Succeeded by: Antonio Abad Santos

24th Governor of Pampanga
- In office September 1962 – December 30, 1971
- Vice Governor: Rodolfo Hizon (1959–1963, 1967–1971); Angel Macapagal (1963–1965); Amado Castillo (1965–1967)
- Preceded by: Dominador Danan (acting)
- Succeeded by: Brigido Valencia
- In office December 30, 1959 – September 3, 1962
- Vice Governor: Rodolfo Hizon (1959–1963)
- Preceded by: Rafael Lazatin
- Succeeded by: Dominador Danan (acting)

Member of the House of Representatives from Pampanga's 1st District
- In office December 30, 1957 – November 10, 1959
- Preceded by: Diosdado Macapagal
- Succeeded by: Juanita Nepomuceno

Personal details
- Born: Francisco Jose Gopez Nepomuceno; May 11, 1916 Angeles, Pampanga, Philippine Islands
- Died: March 2, 1997 (aged 80) Angeles City, Philippines
- Party: Liberal (1957–1997)
- Spouse: Juanita Lumanlan (m. 1940)
- Children: 8, including Francis
- Relatives: Bryan Matthew Nepomuceno (grandson)
- Education: University of Santo Tomas; Colegio de San Juan de Letran
- Occupation: Politician

Francisco Jose Gopez Nepomuceno (May 11, 1916 – March 2, 1997), also known colloquially as "Apung Quitong", was a Filipino politician. He served as mayor of Angeles City from 1980 to 1987. He also served as governor of Pampanga from 1959 to 1971. He represented the first district of Pampanga at the House of Representatives of the Philippines from 1957 to 1959.

Political offices
Preceded by Rafael Lazatin	Mayor of Angeles City; 1980–1987	Succeeded by Antonio Abad Santos
Preceded by Rafael Lazatin	Governor of Pampanga; 1959–1971	Succeeded by Brigido Valencia
House of Representatives of the Philippines
Preceded by Diosdado Macapagal	Representative of 1st District of Pampanga; 1957–1959	Succeeded by Juanita Nepomuceno
