= Jose B. Lingad =

Filipino lawyer and politician (1914–1980)

The Honorable Jose B. Lingad
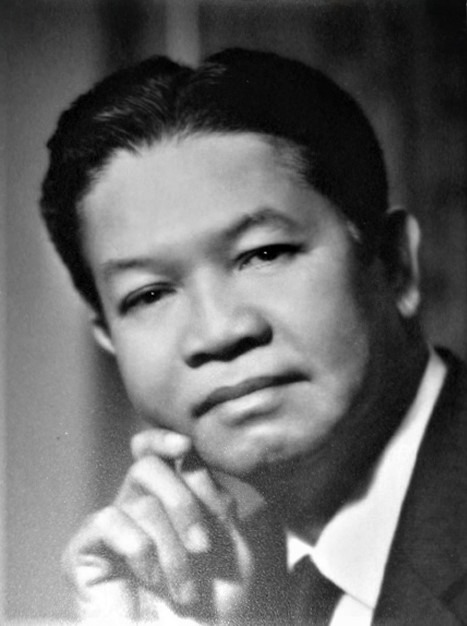

Member of the House of Representatives from Pampanga's 1st district
- In office December 30, 1969 – September 23, 1972
- Preceded by: Juanita Nepomuceno
- Succeeded by: District abolished (Next held by Carmelo Lazatin Sr.)

Secretary of Labor
- In office July 15, 1964 – December 30, 1965
- President: Diosdado Macapagal
- Preceded by: Bernardino Abes
- Succeeded by: Emilio Espinosa Jr.

Commissioner of the Bureau of Customs
- In office January 1964 – July 15, 1964
- President: Diosdado Macapagal
- Preceded by: Rodrigo Perez Jr.
- Succeeded by: Alfredo de Joya

Commissioner of the Bureau of Internal Revenue
- In office July 5, 1963 – September 24, 1963
- President: Diosdado Macapagal
- Preceded by: Amable Aguiluz
- Succeeded by: Ramon Oben
- In office May 22, 1962 – May 31, 1963
- President: Diosdado Macapagal
- Preceded by: Benedicto Padilla
- Succeeded by: Amable Aguiluz

Chairman of the Games and Amusements Board
- In office January 17, 1962 – March 1962
- President: Diosdado Macapagal

22nd Governor of Pampanga
- In office December 30, 1947 – December 30, 1951
- Preceded by: Pablo Ángeles David
- Succeeded by: Rafael Lazatin

Member of the Lubao Municipal Council
- In office January 1, 1938 – December 31, 1940

Personal details
- Born: Jose Bulaon Lingad; November 24, 1914 Lubao, Pampanga, Philippine Islands
- Died: December 16, 1980 (aged 66) San Fernando, Pampanga, Philippines
- Cause of death: Assassination by gunshot
- Party: Liberal (1947–1980)
- Other political affiliations: UNIDO (1980); Nacionalista (1938–1947)
- Spouse: Estela Layug
- Children: 10, including Emigdio
- Education: University of the Philippines; Philippine Law School (LL.B.)
- Occupation: Lawyer, politician

Military service
- Allegiance: Philippines; United States
- Branch/service: United States Army; Philippine Commonwealth Army
- Years of service: 1941–1945
- Rank: Colonel
- Unit: USAFFE
- Commands: East Central Luzon Guerrilla Area
- Battles/wars: World War II; Battle of Bataan

Jose "Joe" Bulaon Lingad (Tagalog: [hoˈse bʊlaɔn ˈliŋgɐd]; November 24, 1914 – December 16, 1980), also known by his initials JBL, was a Filipino lawyer and politician who served as governor of Pampanga from 1948 to 1951 and representative of Pampanga's 1st district from 1969 to 1972. He also became commissioner of the Bureau of Internal Revenue and Bureau of Customs and subsequently secretary of the Department of Labor and Employment. He was assassinated during the martial law regime of president Ferdinand Marcos.

== Early years ==
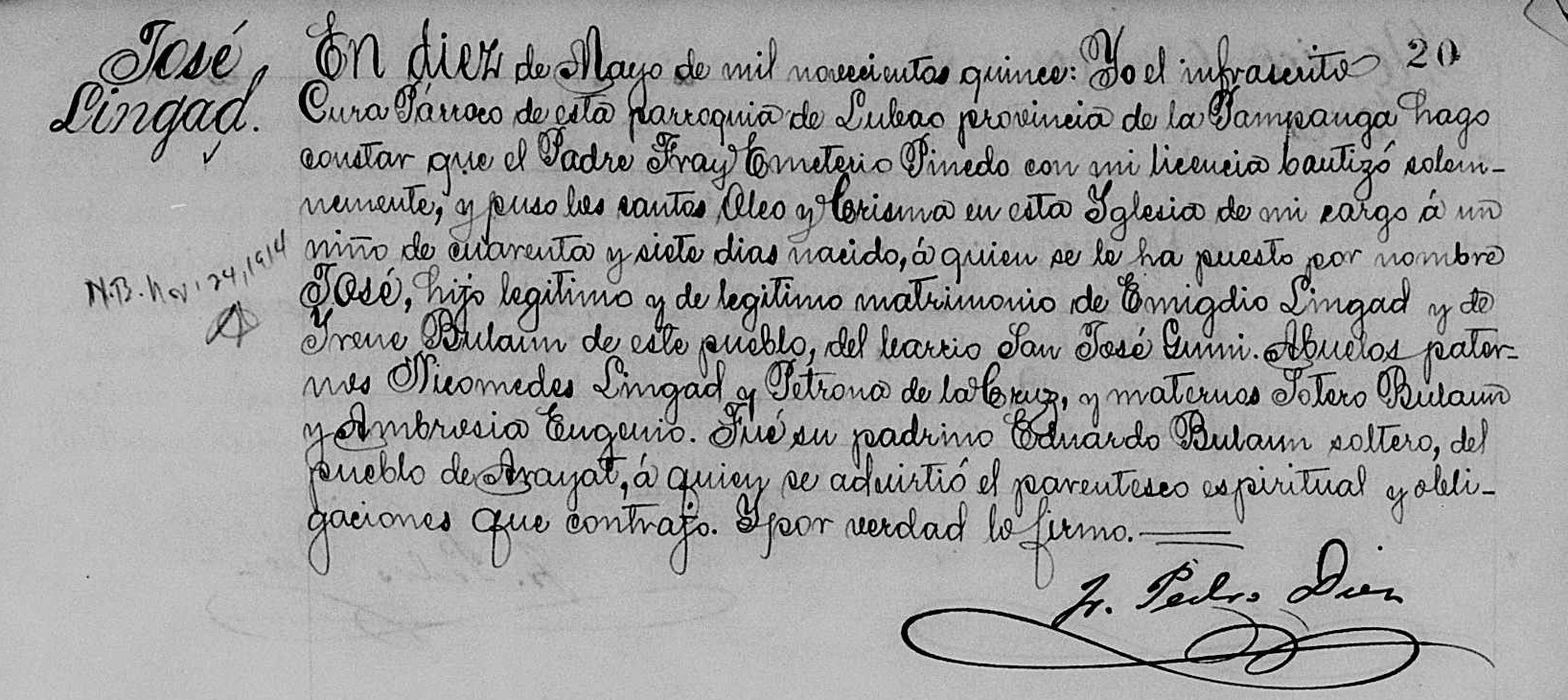
Baptismal record of Jose B. Lingad issued at the San Agustin Parish Church on May 10, 1915.

Jose Bulaon Lingad was born in the barrio of San Jose Gumi, Lubao, Pampanga on November 24, 1914, to Emigdio Lingad of Lubao and Irene Bulaon of Arayat. Lingad studied in Lubao Central Elementary School and Pampanga High School for his primary and secondary education. In college, Lingad took up law at the University of the Philippines and Philippine Law School where he passed the bar exam in 1938. At age 24, he was elected councilor of Lubao, making him one of the youngest elected officials in the country.

== Military career ==
=== Career during World War II ===
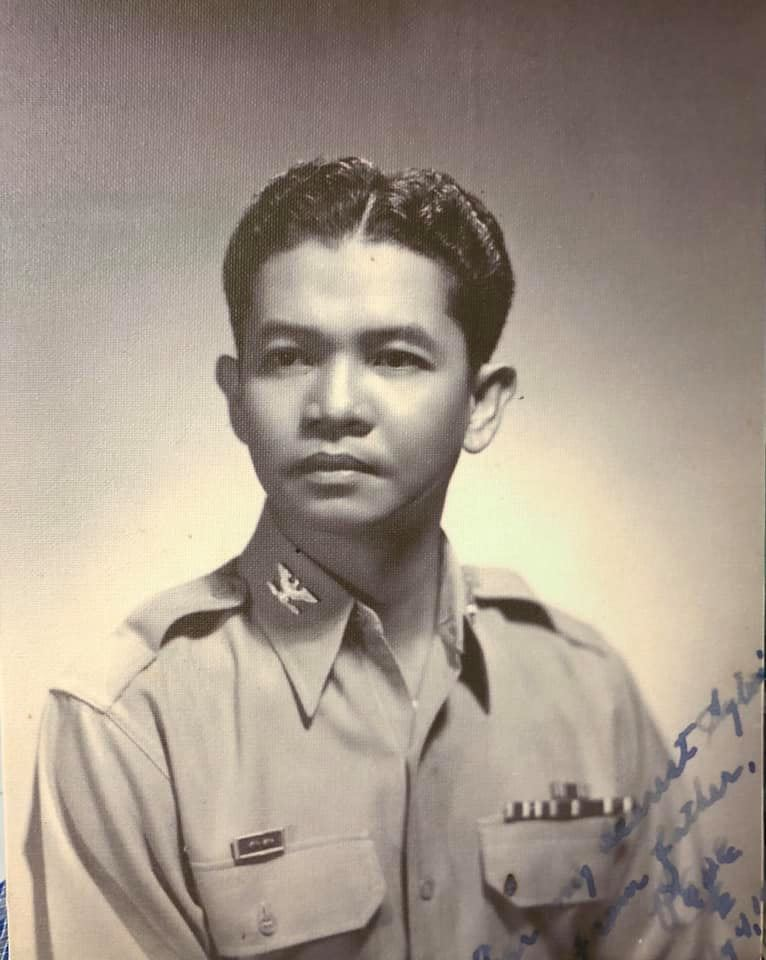
Lingad as a member of the Army during World War II

After the Japanese invasion of the Philippines in 1941, Lingad joined the armed resistance against the Japanese in Bataan. Served as chief of staff under the command of Colonel Edwin Ramsey. He survived the Bataan Death March and later joined the guerrilla movement where he would lead the Pampanga Military District.

== Political career ==
=== Governor of Pampanga ===
Lingad (right) with President Manuel Roxas in 1948

In the 1947 general elections, Lingad was elected governor of Pampanga as a member of the Liberal Party at the age of 33. He also became vice-president of the League of Governors of the Philippines. Seated as governor in 1948, Lingad served a single term, being defeated to Rafael Lazatin for re-election in 1951 due to the fall-out from the Maliwalu massacre in Bacolor. This followed allegations that the paramilitary unit that perpetrated the massacre provided Lingad with protection.

After his term as governor, Lingad was still recognized as the political kingpin of Pampanga. And during the elections of 1949, Lingad nominated Diosdado Macapagal, who was then serving as second secretary of the Philippine embassy in Washington, D.C. to run for the first Congressional district of Pampanga.

With the help and guidance of Lingad, Macapagal would start his political career that would make him president of the Philippines one day as they were childhood friends in Lubao.

=== Macapagal administration official ===
When his protégé Macapagal was elected president in 1961, Lingad joined the Macapagal administration, first as Chairman of Games and Amusement Board, second as Commissioner of Bureau of Internal Revenue, then Commissioner of Bureau of Customs and, ultimately Secretary of Labor.

=== House of Representatives ===
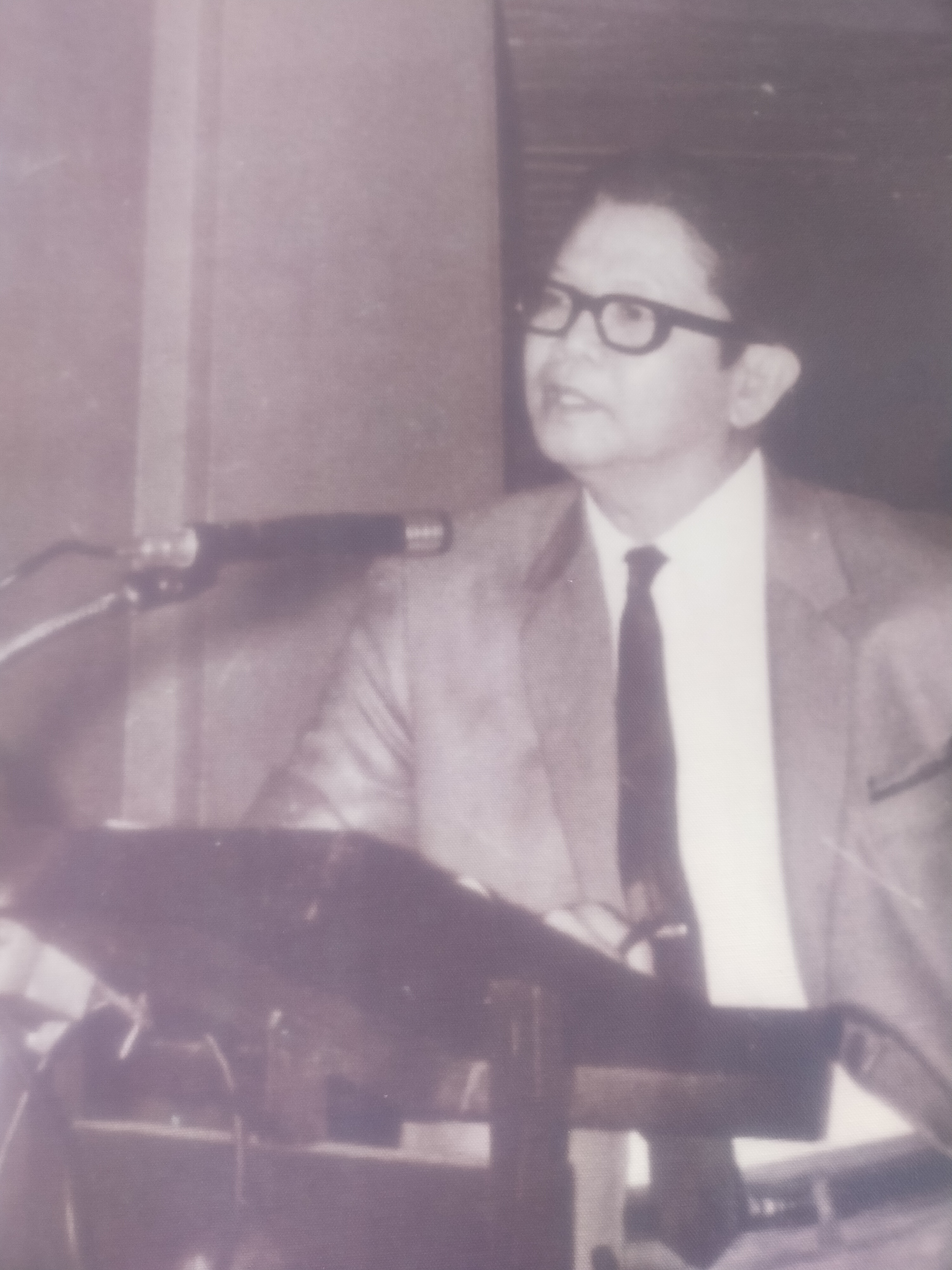
Lingad as a representative

In 1969, Lingad was elected to the House of Representatives under the Liberal Party banner representing the 1st District of Pampanga, the same seat Macapagal had won 20 years earlier. Lingad served in the 7th Congress from 1969 to 1972. Previously perceived as holding right-wing political views, Lingad shifted to the left while in Congress, supporting farmers' rights and dialogue with the leftist insurgency. Lingad's congressional career was abbreviated with the abolition of Congress following the declaration of martial law by Marcos in 1972. On September 28, 1972, Lingad, a member of the political opposition against Marcos, was among the first political figures to be arrested and imprisoned on the day martial law was declared.

=== 1980 Pampanga gubernatorial election ===
Lingad in 1980

Lingad was released from prison after three months and he retired to his Pampanga farm. He was called out of retirement by the opposition leader Benigno Aquino Jr., who urged him to run for Pampanga governor in the January 1980 local elections as a candidate of the anti-Marcos opposition with his running mate Jose Suarez for vice governor. Lingad was defeated by Estelito Mendoza, but he raised charges of fraud which led to the staging of a new election for governor.

== Death ==
On December 16, 1980, at 7:40 in the morning, Lingad was shot in the barangay San Agustin, San Fernando, Pampanga. He was pronounced dead at the scene. His assassin Sgt. Roberto Tabanero, who died in a mysterious car accident before being prosecuted, was identified as a member of the Philippine Constabulary.

=== Funeral ===
National leaders from all sides of the political spectrum attended his wake. Lingad was interred at San Nicolas Catholic Cemetery in Lubao, together with his parents.

== Legacy ==
On November 25, 1989, three years after Marcos was ousted from power, and two months after Marcos died, president Corazon Aquino signed Republic Act No. 6780, renaming the Central Luzon General Hospital in San Fernando, Pampanga, to Jose B. Lingad Memorial Regional Hospital.

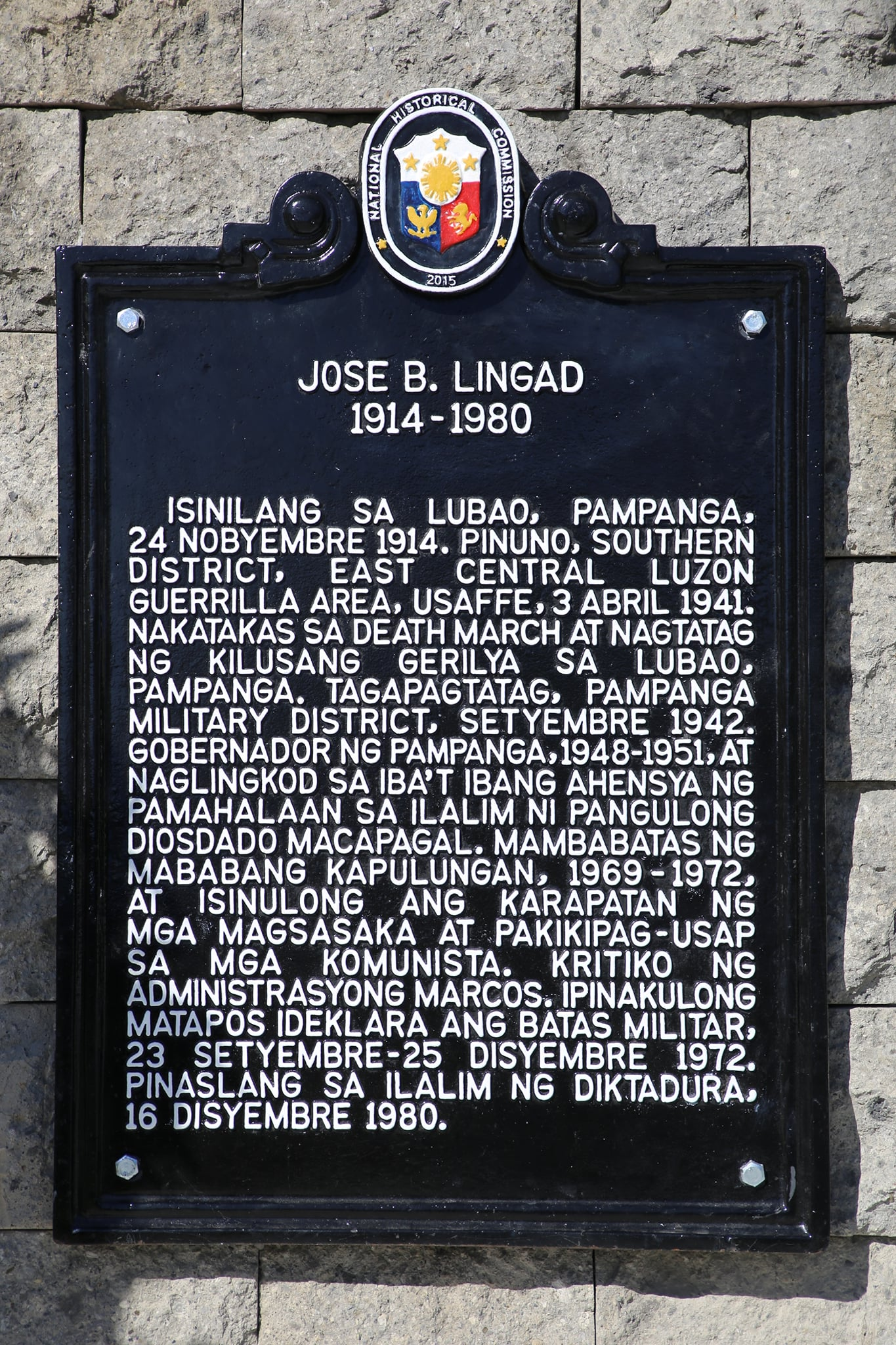
Historical marker

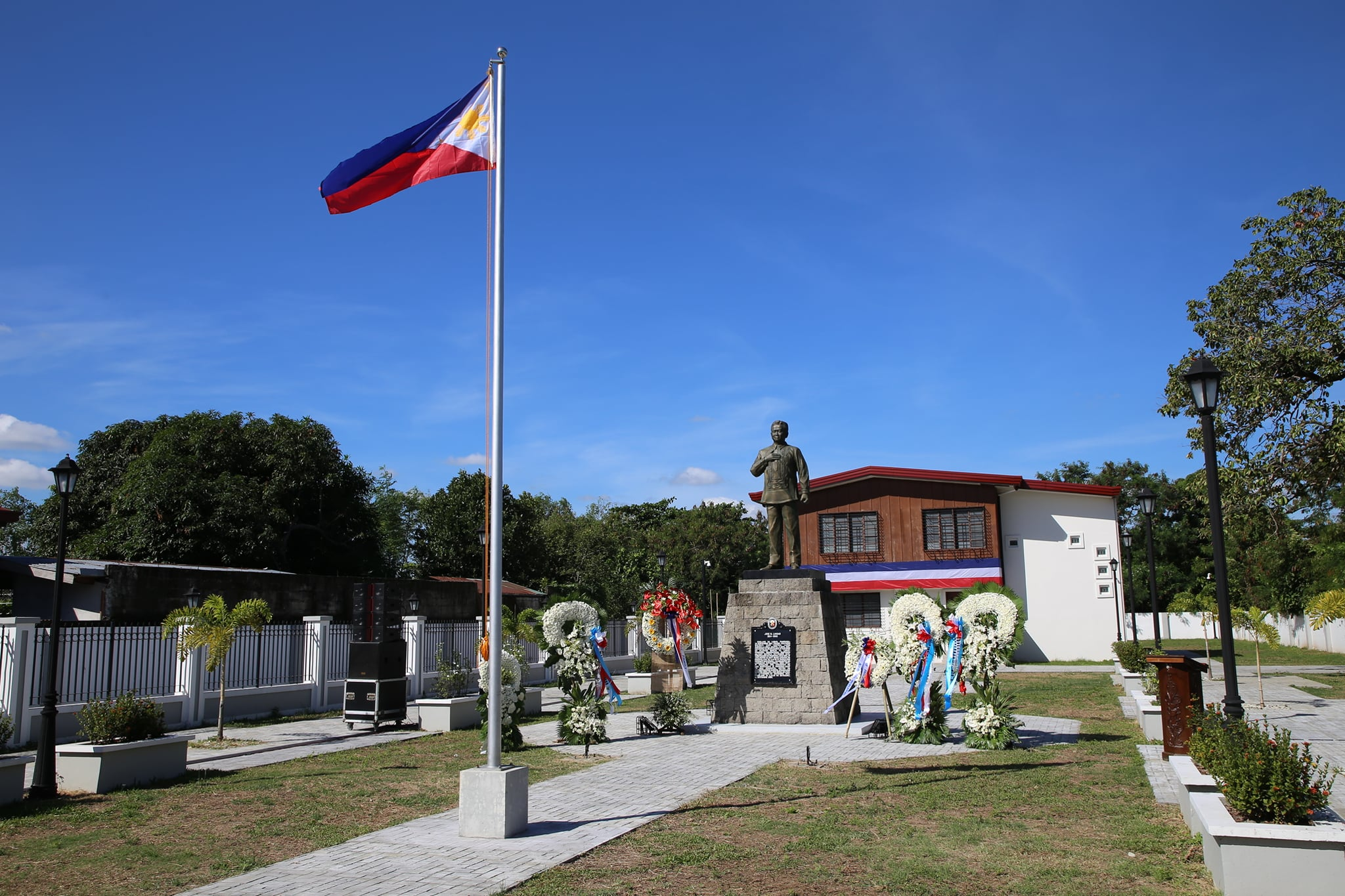
Park and museum

In 2022, a museum dedicated to Lingad was opened at his ancestral home in Lubao, featuring some of his personal effects.

== Personal life ==
Lingad had his first-born Sylvia Lingad de Guzman with his former partner Consuelo Zita Perez. Later, he married Estela Aranita Layug and they had five children including Emigdio "Emy" Lingad, a former Member of Batasang Pambansa, Deputy Minister of Finance, and congressman for 2nd District of Pampanga from 1987 to 1995.

Lingad had four children with her former partner, Catalina Canlas Mañgila. Among them are Jacqueline "Jacquie" Lingad Ricci, former San Francisco commissioner and president of San Francisco Juvenile Probation Commission.

His nephew, Josefo Sarmiento Lingad, was mayor of Lubao from 1965 to 1968.

Government offices
Preceded by Pablo Ángeles David	Governor of Pampanga; 1948–1951	Succeeded by Rafael Lazatin
Preceded by Bernardino Abes	Secretary of Labor and Employment; 1964–1965	Succeeded by Emilio Espinosa Jr.
House of Representatives of the Philippines
Preceded by Juanita Nepomuceno	Representative of 1st District of Pampanga; 1969– 1972	Succeeded by Carmelo Lazatin Sr.
