= Emigdio Lingad =

Filipino economist and politician (1953–2021)

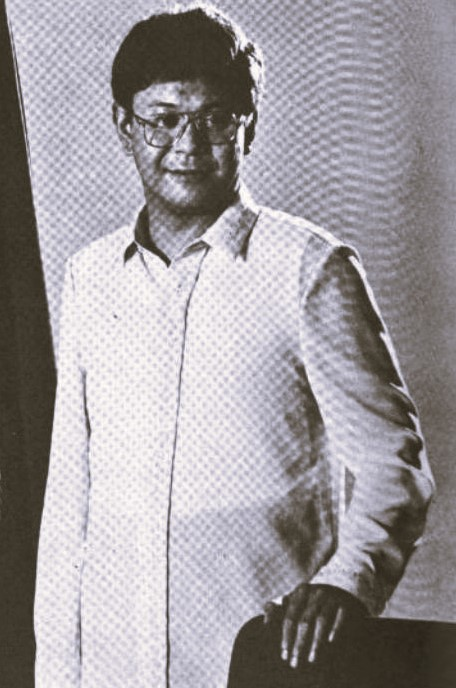
- Lingad official portrait during the 8th Congress.

Member of the House of Representatives from Pampanga's 2nd District
- In office June 30, 1987 – June 30, 1995
- Preceded by: District re-established Post last held by Rogelio O. Tiglao
- Succeeded by: Zenaida Cruz-Ducut

Mambabatas Pambansa (Assemblyman) from Pampanga
- In office June 30, 1984 – March 25, 1986 Serving with Aber Canlas, Rafael Lazatin and Juanita Nepomuceno

Personal details
- Born: May 24, 1953 Lubao, Pampanga, Philippines
- Died: July 1, 2021 (aged 68)
- Party: Lakas (1995–2021)
- Other political affiliations: LDP (1992–1995); PDP–Laban (1987–1992); UNIDO (1984–1987)
- Parent(s): Jose B. Lingad (father); Estela Layug (mother)
- Education: University of San Francisco (BS)
- Occupation: Economist, politician

Emigdio "Emy" Layug Lingad (May 24, 1953 – July 1, 2021) was a Filipino economist and politician. He represented the Pampanga's 2nd district in the House of Representatives of the Philippines from 1987 to 1995. He also represented Pampanga at the Regular Batasang Pambansa from 1984 to 1986.

== Early life and education ==
Lingad was born to former congressman Jose B. Lingad and Estela A. Layug in Lubao, Pampanga on May 24, 1953. He studied at the University of San Francisco, California, over which he gained Bachelor of Arts majoring in economics and political science, as well as his Bachelor of Science in Commerce. He also underwent military training in the US.

== Early career ==
Lingad entered government service as a senior revenue economist at the Bureau of Internal Revenue (BIR).

== Political career ==
Lingad formerly served as a member of the Regular Batasang Pambansa and Undersecretary of Budget Management.

Lingad served as house representative for Pampanga's 2nd district from 1987 to 1995.

== Death ==
Lingad died on July 1, 2021 due to cancer.

== Electoral history ==
=== 1995 ===
1995 Philippine House of Representatives elections
Candidate	Party	Votes	%
Zenaida Cruz-Ducut	Nationalist People's Coalition	67,754	53.07
Emigdio Lingad (incumbent)	Lakas–NUCD–UMDP	59,656	46.73
Marcelino Manalansan	Kilusang Bagong Lipunan	264	0.21
Total		127,674	100.00
Source: Commission on Elections

=== 1992 ===
1992 Philippine House of Representatives elections
Candidate	Party	Votes	%
Emigdio Lingad (incumbent)	Laban ng Demokratikong Pilipino	49,779	41.32
Jesus Nicdao	Lakas–NUCD	37,650	31.25
Aber Canlas	NPC/KBL/Independent	29,914	24.83
Edilberto Paule	Koalisyong Pambansa	500	0.41
Rogelio Bolivar	Kilusang Bagong Lipunan	2,642	2.19
Total		120,485	100.00
Source: Commission on Elections

House of Representatives of the Philippines
Preceded by Rogelio O. Tiglao	Representative of 2nd District of Pampanga; 1987–1995	Succeeded by Zenaida Cruz-Ducut
