= Santa Rita, Pampanga =

Municipality in Pampanga, Philippines

Santa Rita
- Municipality
- Municipality of Santa Rita
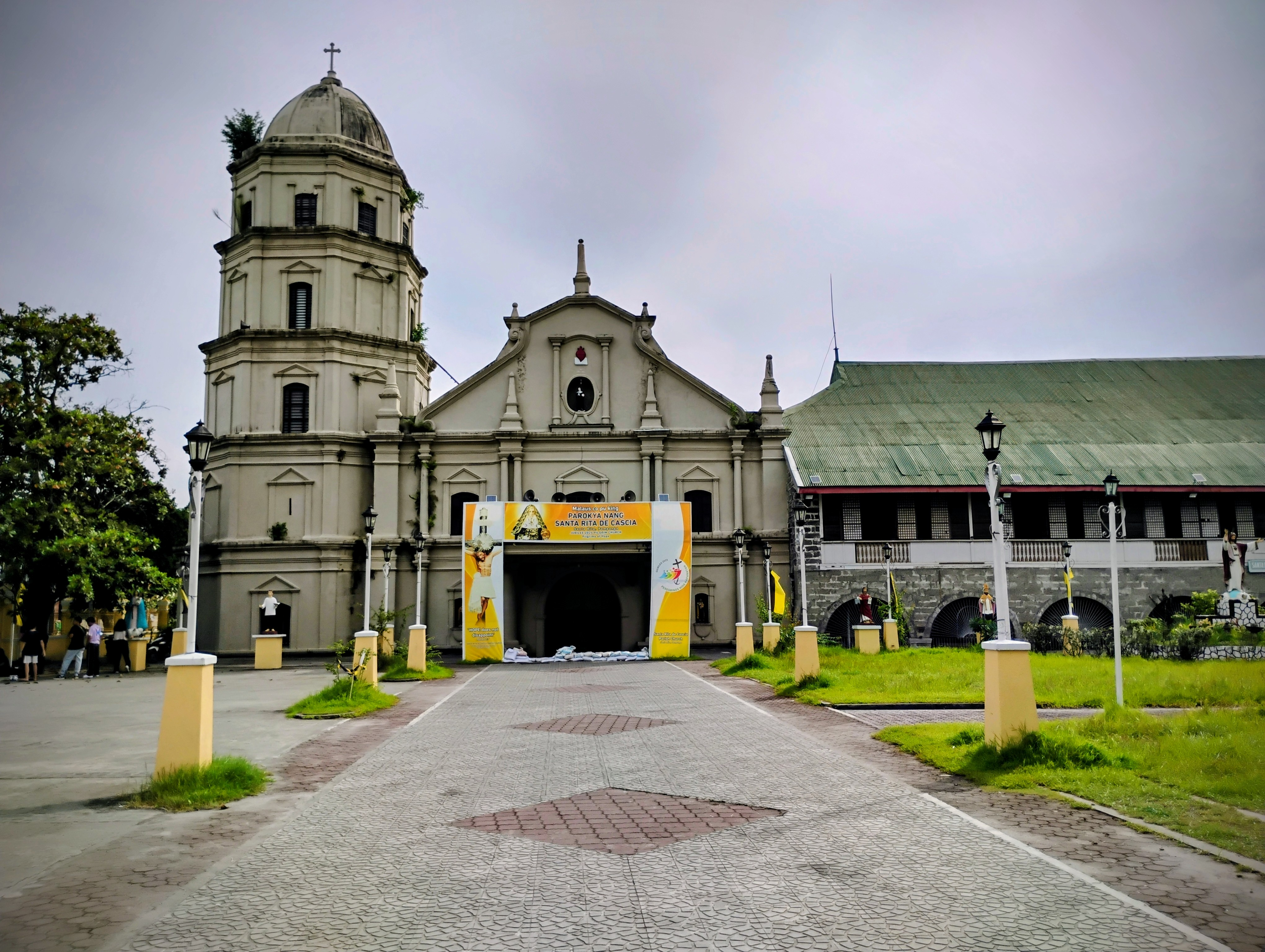
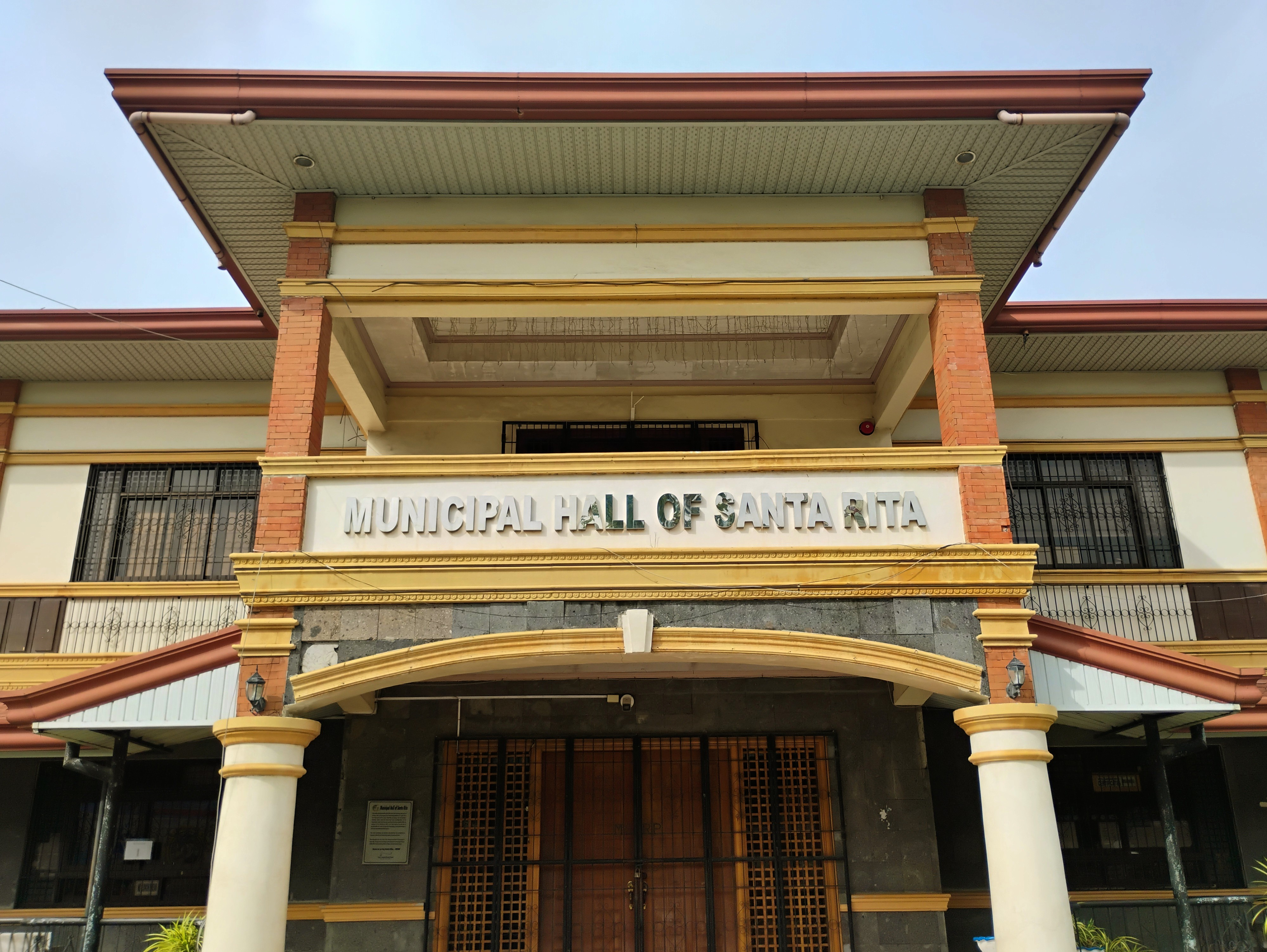
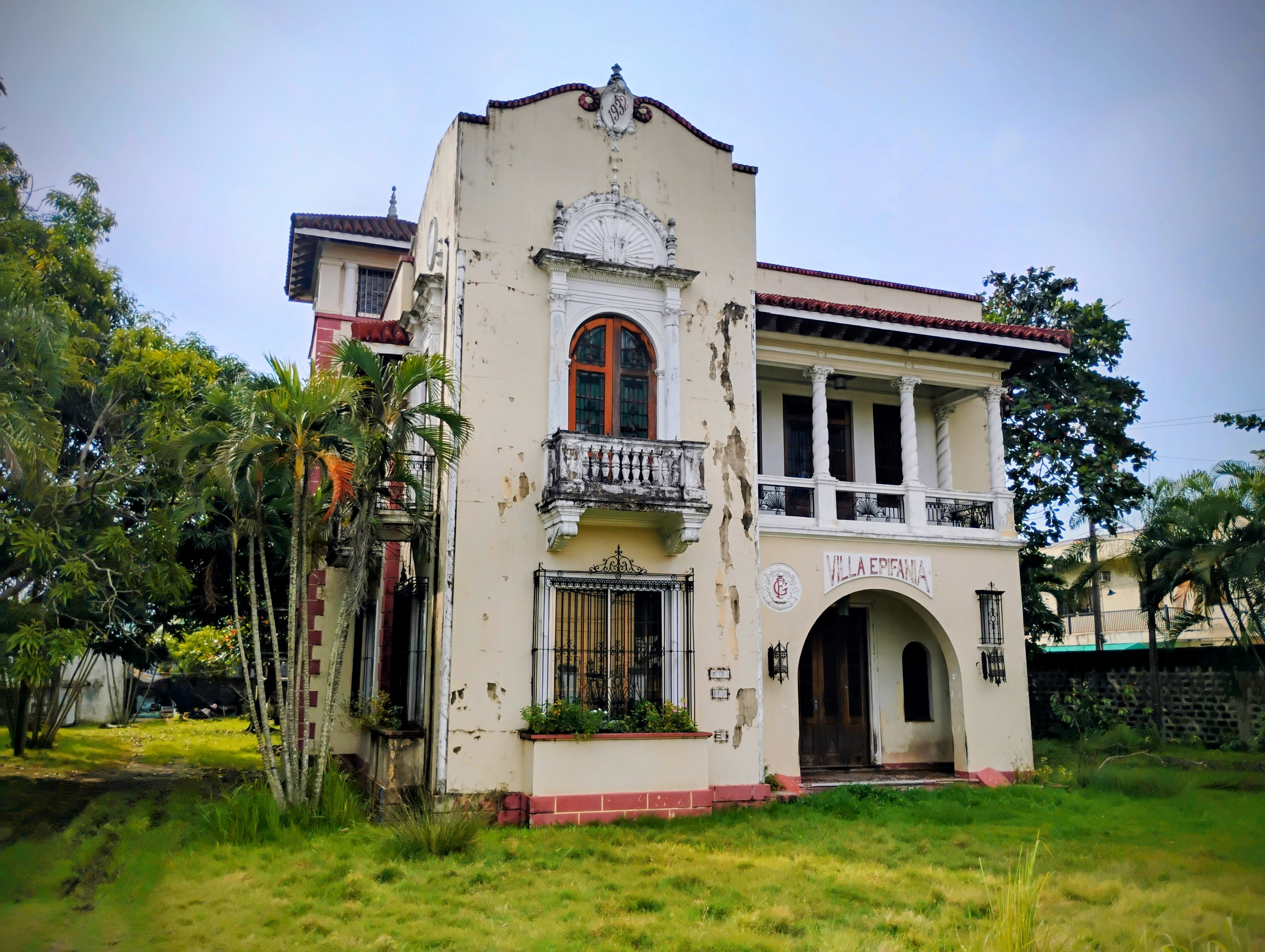
- Santa Rita of Cascia Parish Church Santa Rita Municipal Hall Villa Epifania

- Seal
- Motto: Bayung Santa Rita (New Santa Rita)
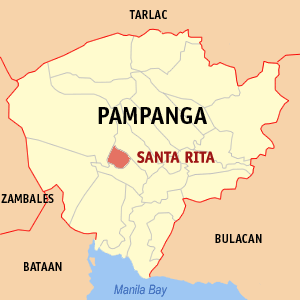
- Map of Pampanga with Santa Rita highlighted
- Interactive map of Santa Rita
- Location within the Philippines
- Coordinates: 14°59′43″N 120°36′55″E
- Country: Philippines
- Region: Central Luzon
- Province: Pampanga
- District: 2nd district
- Named for: St. Rita of Cascia
- Barangays: 10 (see Barangays)

Government
  - Type: Sangguniang Bayan
  - Mayor: Reynan S. Calo
  - Vice Mayor: Ferdinand L. Salalila
  - Representative: Gloria Macapagal-Arroyo
  - Municipal Council: Members: Romeo L. Valencia; Kimberly A. Cosme; Rico H. Sta. Cruz; Renato Q. Gopez; Rogelio S. Galang; Alexander C. Cruz; Jessie S. Pineda; Jesus R. Manalo
  - Electorate: 29,564 voters (2025)

Area
  - Total: 29.76 km^{2} (11.49 sq mi)
- Elevation: 16 m (52 ft)
- Highest elevation: 53 m (174 ft)
- Lowest elevation: −2 m (−6.6 ft)

Population (2024 census)
  - Total: 42,915
  - Density: 1,442/km^{2} (3,735/sq mi)
  - Households: 11,433

Economy
  - Income class: 2nd municipal income class
  - Poverty incidence: 6.9% (2023)
  - Revenue: ₱ 198.4 million (2022)
  - Assets: ₱ 338.4 million (2022)
  - Expenditure: ₱ 178.5 million (2022)
  - Liabilities: ₱ 87.39 million (2022)

Service provider
  - Electricity: Pampanga 2 Electric Cooperative (PELCO 2)
- Time zone: UTC+8 (PST)
- ZIP code: 2002
- PSGC: 0305420000
- IDD : area code: +63 (0)45
- Native languages: Kapampangan; Tagalog
- Website: www.santaritapampanga.gov.ph

Santa Rita, officially the Municipality of Santa Rita (Kapampangan: Balen ning Santa Rita; Tagalog: Bayan ng Santa Rita), is a municipality in the province of Pampanga, Philippines. According to the 2024 census, it has a population of 42,915 people.

It is chiefly an agricultural town. Santa Rita is also famous in Pampanga for the turrones de casoy delicacy, which is a cashew candy.

== History ==
In 1697, the town started as a settlement at a place called Gasac, now Barangay San Isidro. Sta Rita was expanded to a wide territory which is now Barangays San Vicente, San Matias, Santa Monica, San Agustin and San Juan. Due to Hispanicization, Sta Rita was referred to as Santa Rita de Lele or neighbouring Santa Rita and Santa Rita Baculud.

In 1839, Rev. Fr. Francisco Rayo, the town's parish priest, spearheaded the herculean task of building the present Parish Church located in now known as Barangay San Jose. In 1903, the town of Santa Rita registered a population of 7,954.

== Geography ==
Santa Rita is a landlocked town located in the centre of the coastal province of Pampanga. It belongs to the Second District of Pampanga, along with the towns in the south-western part of the province. It is 79 kilometres (49 mi) from Manila.

=== Barangays ===
Santa Rita is politically subdivided into 10 barangays, as shown below. Each barangay consists of puroks and some have sitios.

- Becuran
- Dila Dila
- San Agustin
- San Basilio
- San Isidro
- San Jose (poblacion)
- San Juan
- San Matias (poblacion)
- Santa Monica
- San Vicente (poblacion)

The largest barangays are Dila-dila and San Basilio which occupy more than half (52%) of the total municipal land area. Barangays San Agustin and San Vicente with only a space of 2% and 2.13%, of the whole municipal land area are the smallest barangays.

There are three barangays which compose the poblacion of Santa Rita: barangays San Vicente, San Jose and part of San Matias. Barangay San Vicente serves as the minor Central Business District. It is where the Public Market is located, while Santa Rita Church and the Municipal Hall are located in Barangay San Jose. Mixed old and new houses surround the area.

=== Climate ===
Climate data for Santa Rita, Pampanga
Month	Jan	Feb	Mar	Apr	May	Jun	Jul	Aug	Sep	Oct	Nov	Dec	Year
Mean daily maximum °C (°F)	30 (86)	31 (88)	33 (91)	34 (93)	33 (91)	31 (88)	29 (84)	29 (84)	29 (84)	30 (86)	31 (88)	30 (86)	31 (87)
Mean daily minimum °C (°F)	19 (66)	20 (68)	21 (70)	23 (73)	25 (77)	25 (77)	25 (77)	25 (77)	24 (75)	23 (73)	22 (72)	20 (68)	23 (73)
Average precipitation mm (inches)	8 (0.3)	9 (0.4)	15 (0.6)	34 (1.3)	138 (5.4)	203 (8.0)	242 (9.5)	233 (9.2)	201 (7.9)	126 (5.0)	50 (2.0)	21 (0.8)	1,280 (50.4)
Average rainy days	3.7	4.1	6.5	11.2	21.2	24.9	27.7	26.5	25.5	21.8	12.6	5.6	191.3
Source: Meteoblue (modeled/calculated data, not measured locally)

== Demographics ==
Population census of Santa Rita

Year	Pop.	±% p.a.
1903	7,954	—
1918	8,989	+0.82%
1939	10,801	+0.88%
1948	12,684	+1.80%
1960	15,492	+1.68%
1970	19,439	+2.29%
1975	22,167	+2.67%
1980	24,995	+2.43%

Year	Pop.	±% p.a.
1990	28,296	+1.25%
1995	32,321	+2.52%
2000	32,780	+0.30%
2007	36,723	+1.58%
2010	38,762	+1.99%
2015	40,979	+1.06%
2020	48,209	+3.48%
2024	42,915	−2.75%

Source: Philippine Statistics Authority

In the 2024 census, the population of Santa Rita was 42,915 people, with a density of 1,400 inhabitants per square kilometre or 3,600 inhabitants per square mile.

== Economy ==
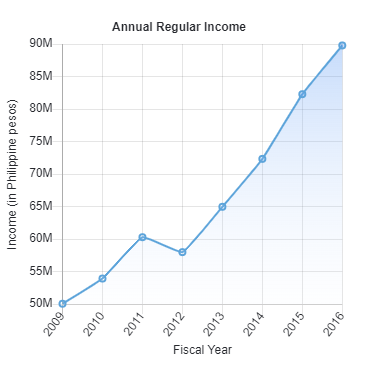

Poverty incidence of Santa Rita (%)

Source: Philippine Statistics Authority

Santa Rita is a second class municipality in the province of Pampanga, Philippines.

== Government ==
=== Local government ===
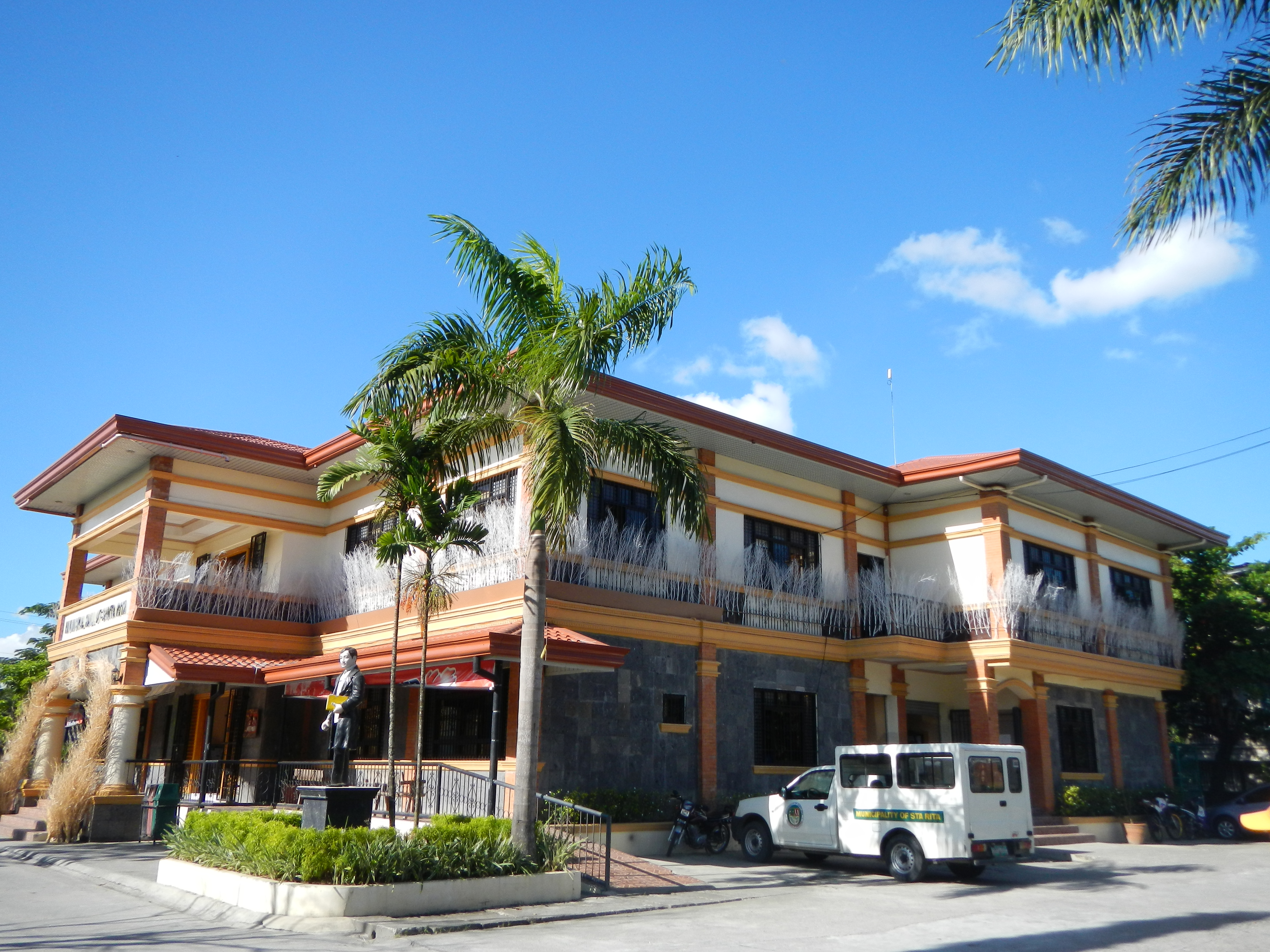
Santa Rita Town Hall

Like other towns in the Philippines, Santa Rita is governed by a mayor and vice mayor who are elected to three-year terms. The mayor is the executive head and leads the town's departments in executing the ordinances and improving public services. The vice mayor heads a legislative council (Sangguniang Bayan) consisting of councilors from the Barangays or Barrios.

The municipal government is divided into three branches: executive, legislative and judiciary. The judicial branch is administered solely by the Supreme Court of the Philippines. The LGUs have control of the executive and legislative branch.

The executive branch is composed of the mayor and the barangay captain for the barangays. The legislative branch is composed of the Sangguniang Bayan (town assembly), Sangguniang Barangay (barangay council), and the Sangguniang Kabataan for the youth sector.

The seat of Government is vested upon the Mayor and other elected officers who hold office at the Town hall. The Sanguniang Bayan is the center of legislation.

=== Elected officials ===
The Local Government Unit LGU of Santa Rita, Pampanga's Elected officials for the term of 2025-2028 are:

- Mayor: Reynan S. Calo
- Vice mayor: Ferdinand L. Salalila
- Sangguniang Bayan Members
  - Romeo L. Valencia
  - Kimberly A. Cosme
  - Rico H. Sta. Cruz
  - Renato Q. Gopez
  - Rogelio S. Galang
  - Alexander C. Cruz
  - Jessie S. Pineda
  - Jesus R. Manalo

== Culture ==
=== Dúman ===
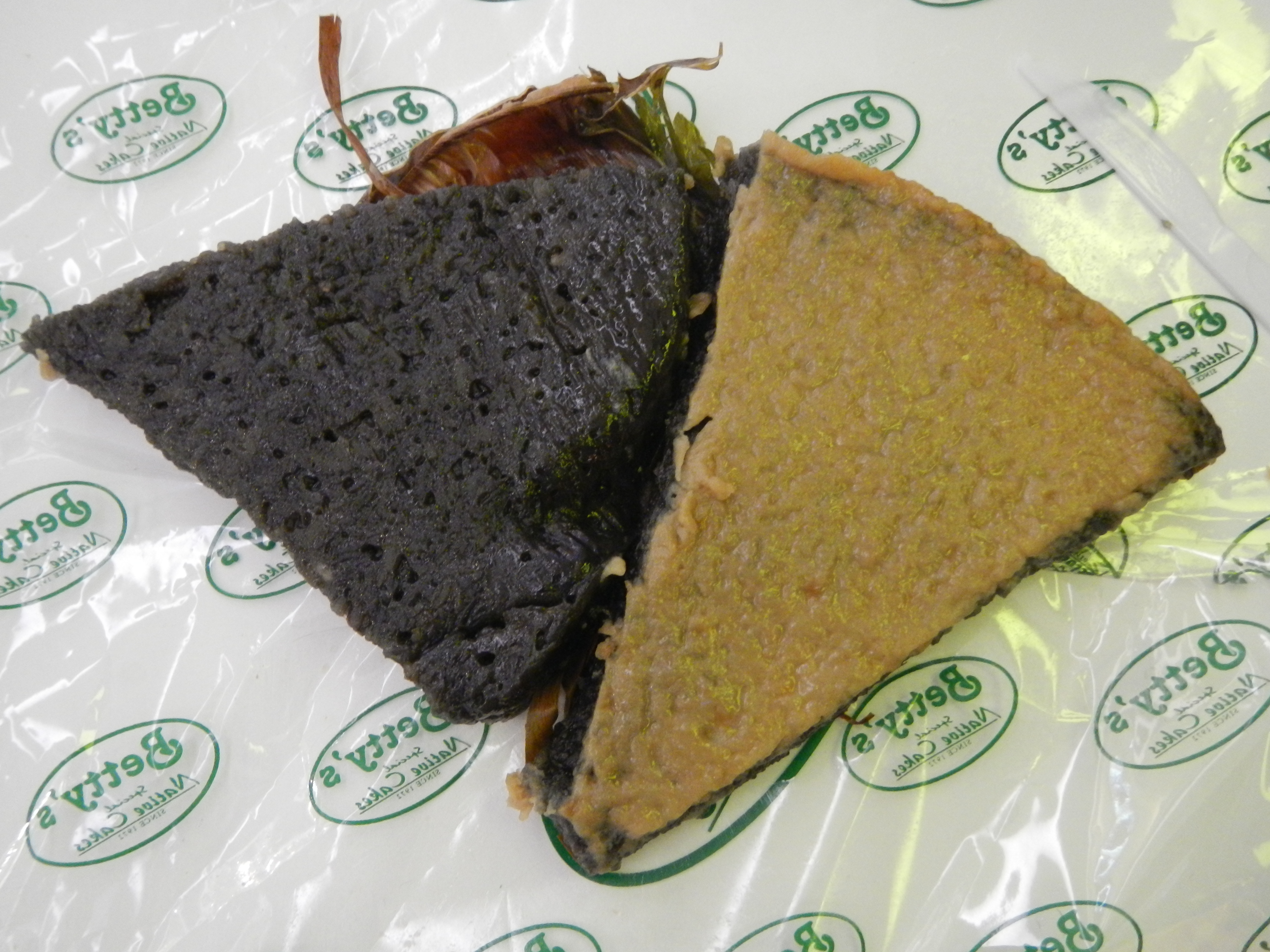
Dúman (Susie's of Tarlac).

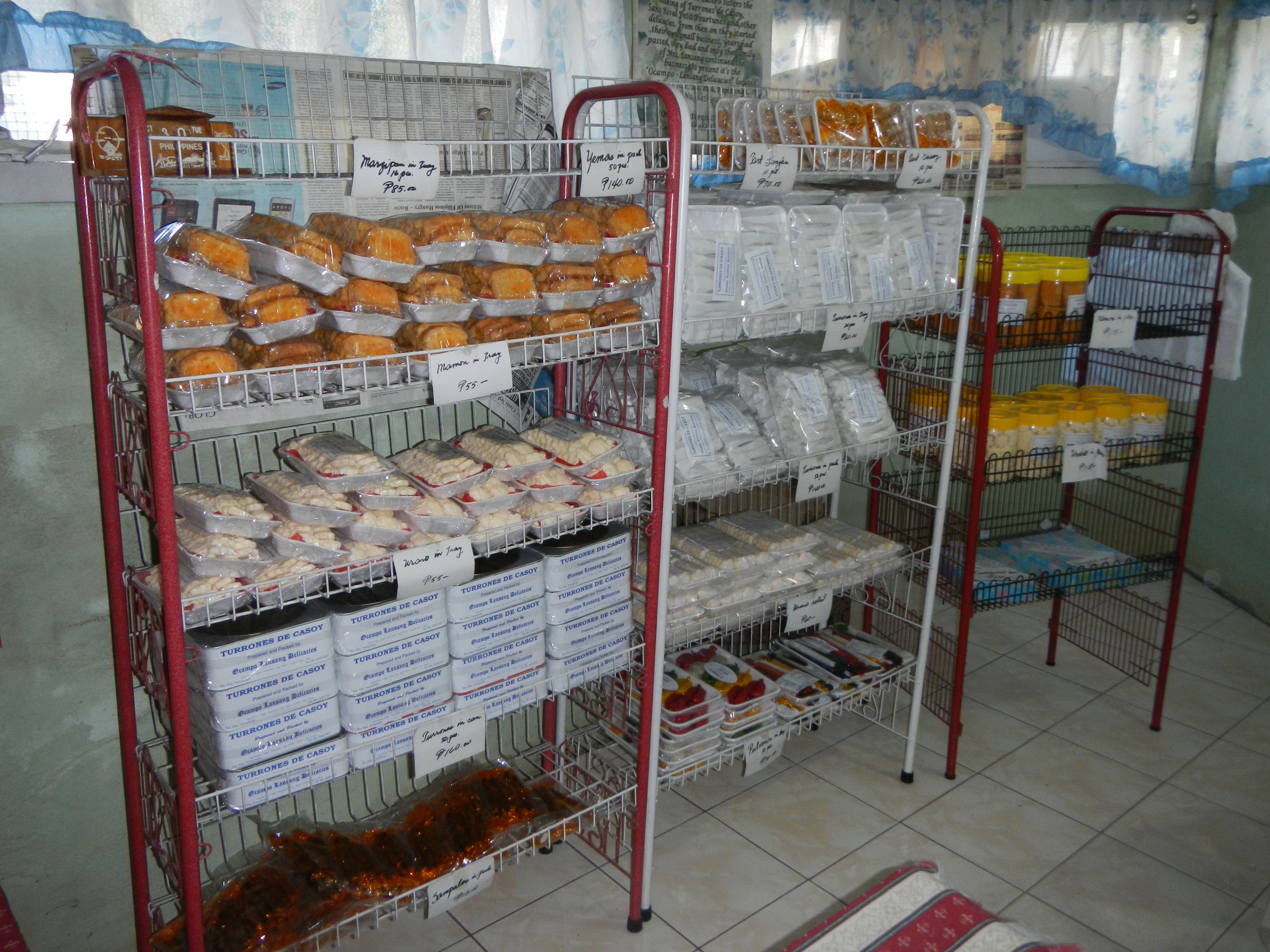
Ocampo Lansang Delicacies (Turones de Casuy, Sansrival, Uraro).

Santa Rita is the home of Dúman and Ocampo-Lansang Delicacies (Turones de Casuy, Sansrival, Uraro and other sweets).

Dúman is made of malagkit rice (lacatan malútû) that is beaten from its husks and toasted in a clay oven. To the rest of the country, it may just be plain green rice or even un-popped pinipig. But it is a prized seasonal food that can be found during the Christmas season, after the rice harvest in November. The younger kernels of rice that do not fall off the husks are colored green. These husks are beaten against a hard surface until they fall off. They are then soaked in water, cooked for 30 minutes and then pounded. This rigorous process helps release the sweet oils and nuttiness of the rice.

Families who produce duman rice are called Mágdurúman. They pass their methods from generation to generation and have kept to the manual production process. Throughout Pampanga, street vendors selling green rice in bilaos or flat baskets are seen. These vendors often sell dúman near churches or marketplaces. It can be eaten plain and munched on like popcorn. It can also be snacked on in spoonfuls with sugar or made into rice cakes. Kapampangans also like adding dúman to other dishes like fresh carabao's milk or hot chocolate as a breakfast cereal, or even ice cream.

Harvested and processed through the end of December, dúman is usually eaten with fresh carabao milk (gátas damúlag) for breakfast or stirred into sucláti (drinking chocolate made with Philippine cacao). In Santa Rita, dúman is honored annually with its own festival.

=== Festival ===
Years ago, during dúman season, Santa Rita's streets rang daily with the “tok-tok” of baseball bat-sized wooden pestles hitting meter-high mortars as lacatan malútû, a red-husked variety of glutinous rice, was transformed into dúman. Nowadays, only a few barangays engage in the laborious and time-consuming production process.

The Dúman Festival started in 2002, which originated from the long-standing tradition of pounding and winnowing unripe glutinous rice (lacatan). The festival features alfresco dining in front of the Santa Rita Church patio were rows and rows of delicacy stalls would sell various pastries and native dishes of the town with duman being the major highlight. The food sold during the festival would include native pastry attractions of the town like sansrival, masa podrido, mamón and mamón tostado.

Dúman is relatively expensive. Food critic Claude Tayag explains that unlike the regular rice variety, which can be planted and harvested three times a year, dúman can only be harvested in the cool air of November and December, otherwise it will not be a bountiful one. For every hectare (San Agustín and Santa Mónica), a farmer can produce only a maximum of 4.5 cavans of duman, while a maximum of 300 cavans can be harvested from the regular rice variety. Dúman prices range from P600 to P1,000 per kilo depending on the quality.

== Heritage ==
=== Santa Rita de Casia Parish Church ===
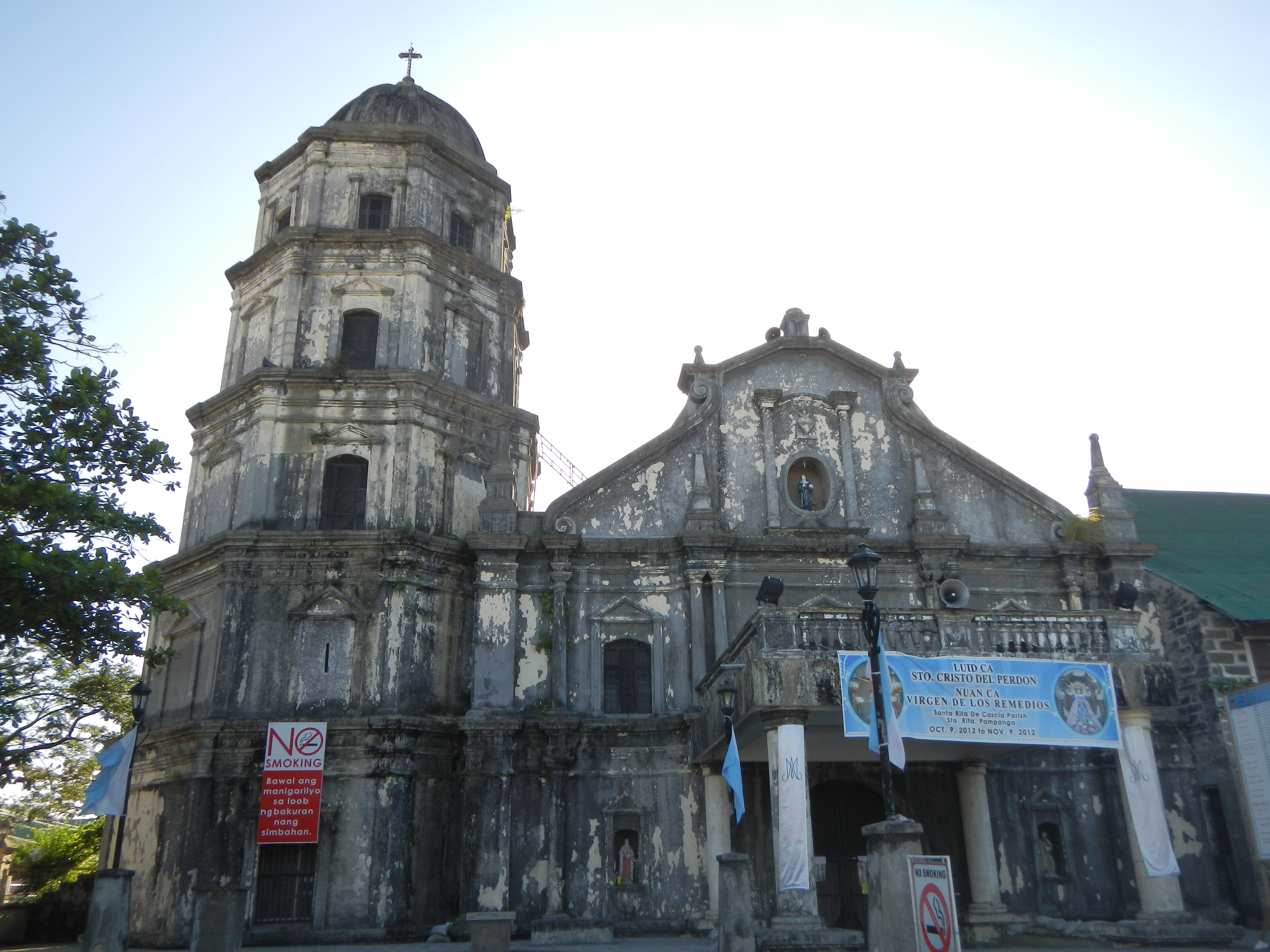
Santa Rita of Casia Parish Church

The heritage Church is under the jurisdiction of the Roman Catholic Archdiocese of San Fernando.

Fr. Pedro de San Nicolas served as minister of both Porac and Santa Rita in 1722, but it was only in 1726 when Santa Rita had its own priest and therefore became an independent parish. Fr. Francisco Royo built the present church in 1839; Fr. Juan Merino completed it in 1868. These two priests also opened the road linking Santa Rita with Porac and Guagua. During the Revolution, the townspeople hid their last Augustianian parish priest, Fr. Celestino Garcia in their houses until the forces of Gen. Maximino Hizon captured him in Bacolor and took him all the way to Lepanto in the Cordilleras.

Building of the church had to be delayed until the late 19th century due to economic adjuristicial conditions. The single-nave church is 55m long, 13m wide and 10m high. It has a large and well lit transept. The solid brass facade has baroque characteristics and the single columns are relatively slender.

==== The reliquary ====
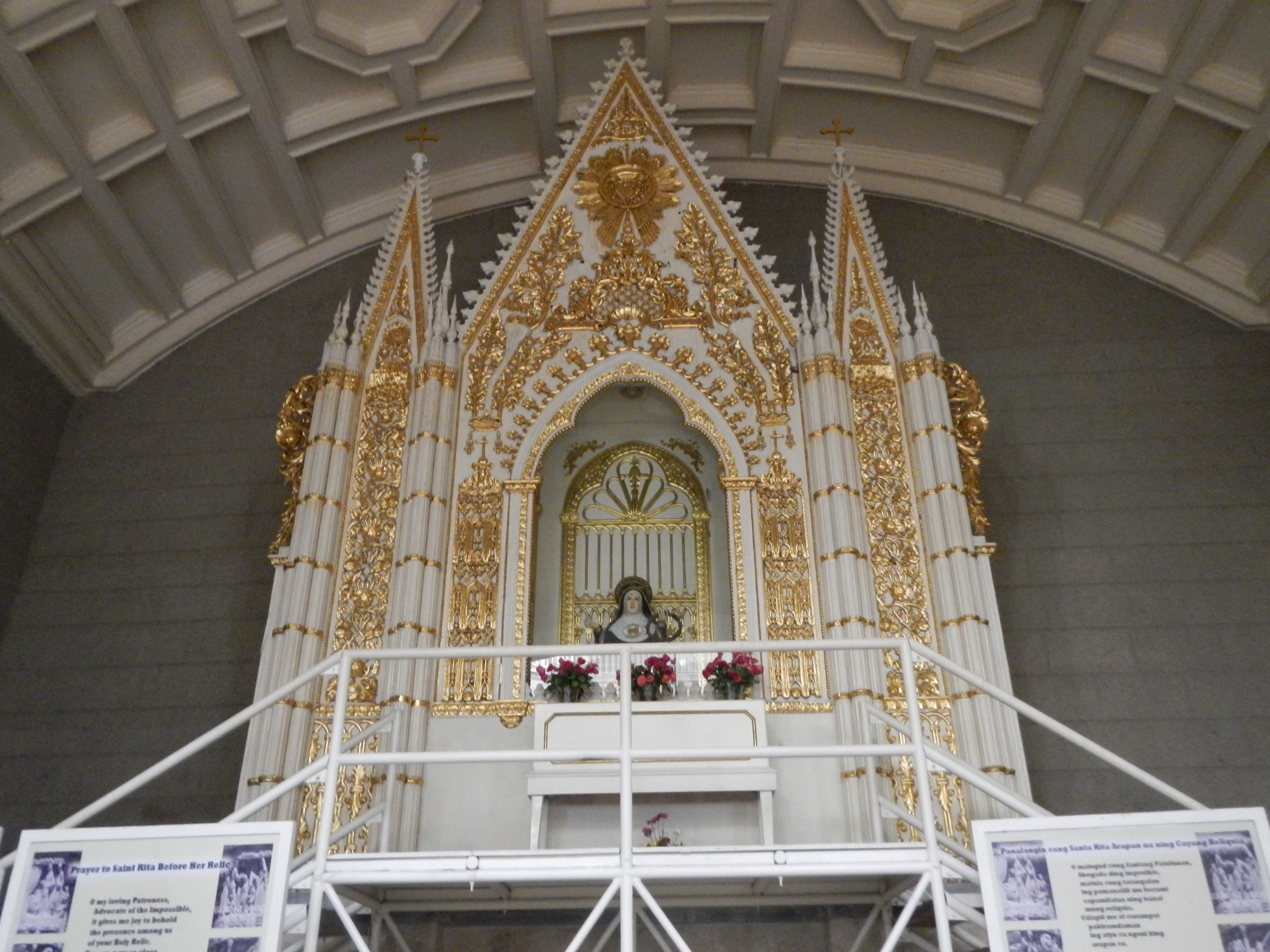
Altar of St. Rita de Casia

The parish is the site where the Holy Relic of Saint Rita de Cascia is enshrined. The parish first obtained the First Class Relic of the saint through the help and assistance of His Excellency, Most Rev. Riccardo Fontana of Spoleto-Norcia, Italy, the archdiocese to which Cascia belongs. Archbishop Fontana forwarded the Relic through the mediation of the Apostolic Nunciature in Manila to Archbishop Paciano Aniceto who in turn handed it over to the parish of Santa Rita de Cascia on August 17, 2008. The First Class Relic is from the flesh “ex carne”of the Saint. As noted in its accompanying Certificate of Authenticity, the relic was part of the last batch extracted from the incorrupt body of Saint Rita on 20 August 1972.

The reliquary is laid open for public veneration every August 17. St. Rita of Cascia (1381) was born in the Italian town of Roccaporena. When her husband and twin sons died, she entered the Augustinian Nuns. The next 40 years of her life saw St. Rita devoting herself to a life of prayer and works and deeds of charity as dictated by the rules of St Augustine. At age 60, while meditating before the cross, a wound seeming afflicted by a thorn appeared on her forehead. St. Rita began boring the sign of stigmatization which is considered being one with Jesus. Because of the stigmata, she suffered in pain for the next 15 years which she courageously accepted. St. Rita died on May 22, 1457. Her intact and incorrupt body is kept and honored in the shrine at her hometown on Cascia, Italy.

== Education ==
The Sta. Rita Schools District Office governs all educational institutions within the municipality. It oversees the management and operations of all private and public, from primary to secondary schools.

=== Primary and elementary schools ===
- Becuran Elementary School
- Diladila Elementary School
- Dominican School, Inc. - Sta. Rita, Pampanga
- Holy Family Village Elementary School
- San Basilio Elementary School
- San Isidro Elementary School
- San Juan Elementary School
- San Matias Elementary School
- Sta. Rita Catholic School
- Sta. Rita Central School
- Sta. Rita College of Pampanga, Inc. | Elementary Department
- V. De Castro Elementary School

=== Secondary schools ===
- Ambrosio S. Simpao Educational Tradet Center of Learning
- Becuran National High School
- Dominican School, Inc. - Sta. Rita, Pampanga
- San Basilio National High School (Becuran National High School Annex)
- Santa Rita College of Pampanga, Inc. | Integrated High School Department

=== Higher educational institution ===
- Santa Rita College of Pampanga, Inc. | College Department

== See also ==
- Historic houses in Santa Rita, Pampanga
