= Legislative districts of Pampanga =

Legislative district of the Philippines

The legislative districts of Pampanga are the representations of the province of Pampanga and the highly urbanized city of Angeles in the various national legislatures of the Philippines. At present, the province and the city are represented in the House of Representatives of the Philippines by its four congressional districts.

== History ==
Pampanga was initially composed of one representative district, wherein it elected four representatives, at large, to the Malolos Congress in 1898. It was later divided into two representative districts in 1907 for the Philippine Assembly; it remained so until 1941. When seats for the upper house of the Philippine Legislature were elected from territory-based districts between 1916 and 1935, the province formed part of the third senatorial district which elected two out of the 24-member senate.

In the disruption caused by the Second World War, Pampanga was represented by two delegates in the National Assembly of the Japanese-sponsored Second Philippine Republic: one was the provincial governor (an ex officio member), while the other was elected through a citywide assembly of KALIBAPI members during the Japanese occupation of the Philippines. Upon the restoration of the Philippine Commonwealth in 1945, Pampanga's pre-war two-district representation was retained; this remained so until 1972.

The province and the chartered city of Angeles were represented in the Interim Batasang Pambansa as part of Region III from 1978 to 1984, and together elected four representatives at-large to the Regular Batasang Pambansa from 1984 to 1986. Pampanga (with the highly urbanized city of Angeles) was redistricted into four congressional districts under the new Constitution which took effect on February 7, 1987, and elected members to the restored House of Representatives starting that same year.

== Current districts ==
The province's current congressional delegation is composed of four members. Among the four incumbent representatives is former president of the Philippines, Gloria Macapagal Arroyo. All four representatives are part of the majority bloc in the 20th Congress.

Political parties

Lakas-CMD (2)
PFP (1)
NUP (1)

Legislative districts and representatives of Pampanga
District	Current Representative		Party	Constituent LGUs	Population (2020)	Area	Map
District	Image	Name	Party	Constituent LGUs	Population (2020)	Area	Map
1st		Carmelo Lazatin Jr. (since 2025); Angeles	PFP	List: Angeles City; Mabalacat; Magalang	775,580	240.77 km²	
2nd		Gloria Macapagal Arroyo (since 2022); Lubao	Lakas–CMD	List: Floridablanca; Guagua; Lubao; Porac; Santa Rita; Sasmuan	655,973	815.48 km²	
3rd		Mica Gonzales (since 2025); San Fernando	Lakas–CMD	List: Arayat; Bacolor; Mexico; San Fernando; Santa Ana	782,547	431.17 km²	
4th		Anna York Bondoc (since 2022); Macabebe	NUP	List: Apalit; Candaba; Macabebe; Masantol; Minalin; San Luis; San Simon; Santo Tomas	581,757	575.05 km²	

== Historical districts ==
=== At-Large (defunct) ===
==== 1898–1899 ====
Period	Representatives
Malolos Congress; 1898–1899	Joaquín González
Malolos Congress; 1898–1899	Ramon Henson
Malolos Congress; 1898–1899	Enrique Macapinlac
Malolos Congress; 1898–1899	José Rodriguez Infante

=== 1943–1944 ===
Period	Representative
National Assembly; 1943–1944	Felix Bautista
National Assembly; 1943–1944	Eligio Lagman (ex officio)

=== 1984–1986 ===
Period	Representative
Regular Batasang Pambansa; 1984–1986	Aber Canlas
Regular Batasang Pambansa; 1984–1986	Rafael Lazatin
Regular Batasang Pambansa; 1984–1986	Emigdio Lingad
Regular Batasang Pambansa; 1984–1986	Juanita Nepomuceno
