= Pampanga's 2nd congressional district =

Legislative district of the Philippines

- Constituency for the House of Representatives of the Philippines
- Boundary of Pampanga's 2nd congressional district in Pampanga
- Location of Pampanga within the Philippines
- Province: Pampanga
- Region: Central Luzon
- Population: 514,041 (2020)
- Electorate: 353,548 (2022)
- Major settlements: 6 LGUs: Municipalities; Floridablanca; Guagua; Lubao; Porac; Santa Rita; Sasmuan
- Area: 815.48 km^{2} (314.86 sq mi)

Current constituency
- Created: 1907
- Representative: Gloria Macapagal Arroyo
- Political party: Lakas–CMD
- Congressional bloc: Majority

Pampanga's 2nd congressional district is one of the four congressional districts of the Philippines in the province of Pampanga. It has been represented in the House of Representatives of the Philippines since 1916 and earlier in the Philippine Assembly from 1907 to 1916. The district consists of the western Pampanga municipalities of Floridablanca, Guagua, Lubao, Porac, Santa Rita and Sasmuan since 1987. Until 1972, it encompassed the eastern Pampanga municipalities of Apalit, Arayat, Candaba, Mabalacat, Magalang, Mexico, Minalin, San Fernando, San Luis, San Simon, Santa Ana, and Santo Tomas. It is currently represented in the 20th Congress by Gloria Macapagal Arroyo of the Lakas–CMD, who served as the House Speaker from July 2018 to June 2019.

This district has the distinction of being the only one ever represented by someone who had previously served as president of the Philippines, as Gloria Macapagal Arroyo represents this district after leaving the presidency from 2010 to 2019 and again since 2022.

== List of members representing the district ==
=== Philippine Assembly (1907–1916) ===
Portrait	Member (Lifespan)	Term of office	Party	Legislature	Electoral history	Constituencies
District created January 9, 1907.
	Marcelino Aguas	October 16, 1907 – October 16, 1909	Nacionalista	1st Legislature	Elected in 1907.	1907–1916; Apalit, Arayat, Candaba, Mabalacat, Magalang, Mexico, Minalin, San Fernando, San Luis, San Simon
	Jacobo Fajardo (1876–1941)	October 16, 1909 – October 16, 1912	Nacionalista	2nd Legislature	Elected in 1909.	1907–1916; Apalit, Arayat, Candaba, Mabalacat, Magalang, Mexico, Minalin, San Fernando, San Luis, San Simon
	Andres Luciano (1880–1959)	October 16, 1912 – October 16, 1916	Nacionalista	3rd Legislature	Elected in 1912.	1907–1916; Apalit, Arayat, Candaba, Mabalacat, Magalang, Mexico, Minalin, San Fernando, San Luis, San Simon

=== House of Representatives (1916–1935) ===
Portrait	Member (Lifespan)	Term of office	Party	Legislature	Electoral history	Constituencies
	Pedro Abad Santos (1876–1945)	October 16, 1916 – June 6, 1922	Nacionalista	4th Legislature	Elected in 1916.	1916–1935; Apalit, Arayat, Candaba, Mabalacat, Magalang, Mexico, Minalin, San Fernando, San Luis, San Simon, Santa Ana
	Pedro Abad Santos (1876–1945)	October 16, 1916 – June 6, 1922	Nacionalista	5th Legislature	Re-elected in 1919.	1916–1935; Apalit, Arayat, Candaba, Mabalacat, Magalang, Mexico, Minalin, San Fernando, San Luis, San Simon, Santa Ana
	Vicente E. Manapat	June 6, 1922 – June 2, 1925	Democrata	6th Legislature	Elected in 1922.	1916–1935; Apalit, Arayat, Candaba, Mabalacat, Magalang, Mexico, Minalin, San Fernando, San Luis, San Simon, Santa Ana
	Ceferino Hilario	June 2, 1925 – June 5, 1928	Nacionalista Consolidado	7th Legislature	Elected in 1925.	1916–1935; Apalit, Arayat, Candaba, Mabalacat, Magalang, Mexico, Minalin, San Fernando, San Luis, San Simon, Santa Ana
	Macario P. Ocampo (1894–1955)	June 5, 1928 – June 2, 1931	Democrata	8th Legislature	Elected in 1928.	1916–1935; Apalit, Arayat, Candaba, Mabalacat, Magalang, Mexico, Minalin, San Fernando, San Luis, San Simon, Santa Ana
	Zoilo Hilario (1892–1963)	June 5, 1928 – June 5, 1934	Nacionalista Consolidado	9th Legislature	Elected in 1931.	1916–1935; Apalit, Arayat, Candaba, Mabalacat, Magalang, Mexico, Minalin, San Fernando, San Luis, San Simon, Santa Ana
	Jose P. Fausto	June 5, 1934 – November 15, 1935	Nacionalista Democrata Pro-Independencia	10th Legislature	Elected in 1934.	1916–1935; Apalit, Arayat, Candaba, Mabalacat, Magalang, Mexico, Minalin, San Fernando, San Luis, San Simon, Santa Ana

=== 1934 Constitutional Convention (1934–1935) ===
Seat A					Seat B					Legislature	Constituencies
Portrait	Member (Lifespan)	Term of office	Party	Electoral history	Portrait	Member (Lifespan)	Term of office	Party	Electoral history	Legislature	Constituencies
	José Alejandrino (1870–1951)	July 30, 1934 – February 19, 1935	Nonpartisan	Elected in 1934.		Jose Gutierrez David	July 30, 1934 – February 19, 1935	Nonpartisan	Elected in 1934.	1934 Constitutional Convention	1934–1935; Apalit, Arayat, Candaba, Mabalacat, Magalang, Mexico, Minalin, San Fernando, San Luis, San Simon, Santa Ana

=== National Assembly (1935–1945) ===
==== Commonwealth ====
Portrait	Member (Lifespan)	Term of office	Party	Legislature	Electoral history	Constituencies
	Jose P. Fausto	November 15, 1935 – December 30, 1941	Nacionalista Democrata Pro-Independencia	1st National Assembly	Re-elected in 1935.	1935–1941; Apalit, Arayat, Candaba, Mabalacat, Magalang, Mexico, Minalin, San Fernando, San Luis, San Simon, Santa Ana
	Fausto Gonzales Sioco (1897–1951)	November 15, 1935 – December 30, 1941	Nacionalista	2nd National Assembly	Elected in 1938.	1935–1941; Apalit, Arayat, Candaba, Mabalacat, Magalang, Mexico, Minalin, San Fernando, San Luis, San Simon, Santa Ana
District dissolved into the two-seat Pampanga's at-large district for the Second Republic National Assembly.

=== House of Representatives (1945–1973) ===
Portrait	Member (Lifespan)	Term of office	Party	Legislature	Electoral history	Constituencies
District re-created May 24, 1945.
	Jose P. Fausto	June 9, 1945 – May 25, 1946	Nacionalista	1st Commonwealth Congress	Elected in 1941.	1945–1953; Apalit, Arayat, Candaba, Mabalacat, Magalang, Mexico, Minalin, San Fernando, San Luis, San Simon, Santa Ana
	Luis Taruc (1913–2005)	May 25, 1946 – June 1, 1946	Democratic Alliance	2nd Commonwealth Congress	Elected in 1946. Resigned to resume Hukbalahap rebellion leadership.	1945–1953; Apalit, Arayat, Candaba, Mabalacat, Magalang, Mexico, Minalin, San Fernando, San Luis, San Simon, Santa Ana
Vacant (June 1, 1946 – December 30, 1949)				2nd Commonwealth Congress	No special election held to fill vacancy.	1945–1953; Apalit, Arayat, Candaba, Mabalacat, Magalang, Mexico, Minalin, San Fernando, San Luis, San Simon, Santa Ana
Vacant (June 1, 1946 – December 30, 1949)				1st Congress	No special election held to fill vacancy.	1945–1953; Apalit, Arayat, Candaba, Mabalacat, Magalang, Mexico, Minalin, San Fernando, San Luis, San Simon, Santa Ana
	Artemio Macalino	December 30, 1949 – December 30, 1953	Liberal	2nd Congress	Elected in 1949.	1945–1953; Apalit, Arayat, Candaba, Mabalacat, Magalang, Mexico, Minalin, San Fernando, San Luis, San Simon, Santa Ana
	Emilio P. Cortez	December 30, 1953 – December 30, 1965	Nacionalista	3rd Congress	Elected in 1953.	1953–1972; Apalit, Arayat, Candaba, Mabalacat, Magalang, Mexico, Minalin, San Fernando, San Luis, San Simon, Santa Ana, Santo Tomas
	Emilio P. Cortez	December 30, 1953 – December 30, 1965	Nacionalista	4th Congress	Re-elected in 1957.	1953–1972; Apalit, Arayat, Candaba, Mabalacat, Magalang, Mexico, Minalin, San Fernando, San Luis, San Simon, Santa Ana, Santo Tomas
	Emilio P. Cortez	December 30, 1953 – December 30, 1965	Nacionalista	5th Congress	Re-elected in 1961.	1953–1972; Apalit, Arayat, Candaba, Mabalacat, Magalang, Mexico, Minalin, San Fernando, San Luis, San Simon, Santa Ana, Santo Tomas
	Angel Macapagal (1917–1993)	December 30, 1965 – December 30, 1969	Liberal	6th Congress	Elected in 1965.	1953–1972; Apalit, Arayat, Candaba, Mabalacat, Magalang, Mexico, Minalin, San Fernando, San Luis, San Simon, Santa Ana, Santo Tomas
Vacant (December 30, 1969 – February 29, 1972)				7th Congress	Proclamation of winner suspended due to ongoing election protest case.	1953–1972; Apalit, Arayat, Candaba, Mabalacat, Magalang, Mexico, Minalin, San Fernando, San Luis, San Simon, Santa Ana, Santo Tomas
	Rogelio Tiglao	February 29, 1972 – January 17, 1973	Liberal	7th Congress	Declared winner of 1969 elections. Term cut short upon the ratification of a new Constitution.	1953–1972; Apalit, Arayat, Candaba, Mabalacat, Magalang, Mexico, Minalin, San Fernando, San Luis, San Simon, Santa Ana, Santo Tomas
District dissolved into the sixteen-seat Region III's at-large district for the Interim Batasang Pambansa, followed by the four-seat Pampanga's at-large district for the Regular Batasang Pambansa.

=== 1971 Constitutional Convention (1971–1972) ===
Seat A					Seat B					Seat C					Legislature	Constituencies
Portrait	Member (Lifespan)	Term of office	Party	Electoral history	Portrait	Member (Lifespan)	Term of office	Party	Electoral history	Portrait	Member (Lifespan)	Term of office	Party	Electoral history	Legislature	Constituencies
	Amelito Mutuc	June 1, 1971 – November 29, 1972	Nonpartisan	Elected in 1970.		Ricardo Sagmit Jr.	June 1, 1971 – November 29, 1972	Nonpartisan	Elected in 1970.		Bren Guiao (1934–1997)	June 1, 1971 – November 29, 1972	Nonpartisan	Elected in 1970.	1971 Constitutional Convention	1971–1972; Apalit, Arayat, Candaba, Mabalacat, Magalang, Mexico, Minalin, San Fernando, San Luis, San Simon, Santa Ana, Santo Tomas

=== House of Representatives (1987–present) ===
Portrait	Member (Lifespan)	Term of office	Party	Legislature	Electoral history	Constituencies
District re-created February 2, 1987.
	Emigdio Lingad (1953–2021)	June 30, 1987 – June 30, 1995	PDP–Laban	8th Congress	Elected in 1987.	1987–present Floridablanca, Guagua, Lubao, Porac, Santa Rita, Sasmuan (known as Sexmoan until 1992)
	Emigdio Lingad (1953–2021)	June 30, 1987 – June 30, 1995	LDP	9th Congress	Re-elected in 1992.	1987–present Floridablanca, Guagua, Lubao, Porac, Santa Rita, Sasmuan (known as Sexmoan until 1992)
	Zenaida Cruz-Ducut (born 1956)	June 30, 1995 – June 30, 2004	NPC	10th Congress	Elected in 1995.	1987–present Floridablanca, Guagua, Lubao, Porac, Santa Rita, Sasmuan (known as Sexmoan until 1992)
	Zenaida Cruz-Ducut (born 1956)	June 30, 1995 – June 30, 2004	LAMMP	11th Congress	Re-elected in 1998.	1987–present Floridablanca, Guagua, Lubao, Porac, Santa Rita, Sasmuan (known as Sexmoan until 1992)
	Zenaida Cruz-Ducut (born 1956)	June 30, 1995 – June 30, 2004	NPC (NPK)	12th Congress	Re-elected in 2001.	1987–present Floridablanca, Guagua, Lubao, Porac, Santa Rita, Sasmuan (known as Sexmoan until 1992)
	Mikey Arroyo (born 1969)	June 30, 2004 – June 30, 2010	Lakas	13th Congress	Elected in 2004.	1987–present Floridablanca, Guagua, Lubao, Porac, Santa Rita, Sasmuan (known as Sexmoan until 1992)
	Mikey Arroyo (born 1969)	June 30, 2004 – June 30, 2010	Lakas	14th Congress	Re-elected in 2007.	1987–present Floridablanca, Guagua, Lubao, Porac, Santa Rita, Sasmuan (known as Sexmoan until 1992)
	Gloria Macapagal Arroyo (born 1947)	June 30, 2010 – June 30, 2019	Lakas (until 2017)	15th Congress	Elected in 2010.	1987–present Floridablanca, Guagua, Lubao, Porac, Santa Rita, Sasmuan (known as Sexmoan until 1992)
	Gloria Macapagal Arroyo (born 1947)	June 30, 2010 – June 30, 2019	Lakas (until 2017)	16th Congress	Re-elected in 2013.	1987–present Floridablanca, Guagua, Lubao, Porac, Santa Rita, Sasmuan (known as Sexmoan until 1992)
	Gloria Macapagal Arroyo (born 1947)	June 30, 2010 – June 30, 2019	Lakas (until 2017)	17th Congress	Re-elected in 2016.	1987–present Floridablanca, Guagua, Lubao, Porac, Santa Rita, Sasmuan (known as Sexmoan until 1992)
	Gloria Macapagal Arroyo (born 1947)	June 30, 2010 – June 30, 2019	PDP–Laban (from 2017)	17th Congress	Re-elected in 2016.	1987–present Floridablanca, Guagua, Lubao, Porac, Santa Rita, Sasmuan (known as Sexmoan until 1992)
	Mikey Arroyo (born 1969)	June 30, 2019 – June 30, 2022	Lakas	18th Congress	Elected in 2019.	1987–present Floridablanca, Guagua, Lubao, Porac, Santa Rita, Sasmuan (known as Sexmoan until 1992)
	Gloria Macapagal Arroyo (born 1947)	June 30, 2022 – June 30, present	Lakas	19th Congress	Elected in 2022.	1987–present Floridablanca, Guagua, Lubao, Porac, Santa Rita, Sasmuan (known as Sexmoan until 1992)
	Gloria Macapagal Arroyo (born 1947)	June 30, 2022 – June 30, present	Lakas	20th Congress	Re-elected in 2025.	1987–present Floridablanca, Guagua, Lubao, Porac, Santa Rita, Sasmuan (known as Sexmoan until 1992)

== Election results ==
=== 1965 ===
1965 Philippine House of Representatives election in Pampanga's 2nd district
Party	Candidate	Votes	%
Liberal	Angel Macapagal	38,563	48.72
Nacionalista	Emilio Cortez (incumbent)	17,701	22.36
Independent	Leoncio Paruñgao Jr.	14,989	18.94
Independent	Mario Bundalian	2,099	2.65
Nacionalista (Independent)	Pedro Canlas	1,709	2.16
Liberal	Justo Barredo	1,593	2.01
Nacionalista	Alfonsio Sagcal	911	1.15
Independent	Wilfredo Castor	760	0.96
Liberal	Meliton Soliman	753	0.95
PPP	Priscilo Mejia	75	0.09
Total votes		79,153	100.00
Liberal hold			

=== 1992 ===
1992 Philippine House of Representatives election in Pampanga's 2nd district
Candidate	Party	Votes	%
Emigdio Lingad (incumbent)	Laban ng Demokratikong Pilipino	49,779	41.32
Jesus Nicdao	Lakas–NUCD	37,650	31.25
Aber Canlas	NPC/KBL/Independent	29,914	24.83
Edilberto Paule	Koalisyong Pambansa	500	0.41
Rogelio Bolivar	Kilusang Bagong Lipunan	2,642	2.19
Total		120,485	100.00
Source: Commission on Elections

=== 1995 ===
1995 Philippine House of Representatives election in Pampanga's 2nd district
Candidate	Party	Votes	%
Zenaida Cruz-Ducut	Nationalist People's Coalition	67,754	53.07
Emigdio Lingad (incumbent)	Lakas–NUCD–UMDP	59,656	46.73
Marcelino Manalansan	Kilusang Bagong Lipunan	264	0.21
Total		127,674	100.00
Source: Commission on Elections

=== 1998 ===
1998 Philippine House of Representatives election in Pampanga's 2nd district
Candidate	Party	Votes	%
Zenaida Cruz-Ducut (incumbent)	Laban ng Makabayang Masang Pilipino	94,226	56.57
Roy David	Lakas–NUCD–UMDP	48,845	29.33
Dante David	Liberal Party	23,407	14.05
Marcelino Manalansan	Independent	77	0.05
Total		166,555	100.00
Source: Commission on Elections

=== 2007 ===
2007 Philippine House of Representatives election in Pampanga's 2nd district
Party	Candidate	Votes	%
Lakas–Kampi	Mikey Arroyo (incumbent)	128,714	92.46
Liberal	Jose Montemayor Jr.	10,490	7.54
Total votes		139,204	100.00
Lakas–Kampi gain from NPC			

=== 2010 ===
2010 Philippine House of Representatives election in Pampanga's 2nd district
Party	Candidate	Votes	%
Lakas–Kampi	Gloria Macapagal Arroyo	169,109	84.23
Liberal	Adonis Simpao	20,922	10.42
Independent	Rona Cea-Sampang	7,150	3.56
Independent	Feliciano Serrano	3,586	1.79
Valid ballots		200,767	91.43
Invalid or blank votes		18,825	8.57
Total votes		219,592	100.00
Lakas–Kampi hold			

=== 2013 ===
2013 Philippine House of Representatives election in Pampanga's 2nd district
Party	Candidate	Votes	%
Lakas	Gloria Macapagal Arroyo (incumbent)	149,344	88.46
Liberal	Vivian Dabu	16,238	9.62
Independent	Rona Cea-Sampang	1,966	1.16
Independent	Feliciano Serrano	1,271	0.75
Valid ballots		168,819	88.44
Invalid or blank votes		22,065	11.56
Total votes		190,884	100.00
Lakas hold			

=== 2016 ===
2016 Philippine House of Representatives election in Pampanga's 2nd district
Party	Candidate	Votes	%
Lakas	Gloria Macapagal Arroyo (incumbent)	190,631	100.00
Valid ballots		190,631	80.02
Invalid or blank votes		47,599	19.98
Total votes		238,230	100.00
Lakas hold			

=== 2019 ===
2019 Philippine House of Representatives election in Pampanga's 2nd district
Party	Candidate	Votes	%
Lakas	Mikey Arroyo	207,151	93.57
Independent	Jun Puling Ponio	14,235	6.43
Total votes		221,386	100.00
Lakas gain from PDP–Laban			

=== 2022 ===
2022 Philippine House of Representatives election in Pampanga's 2nd district
Party	Candidate	Votes	%
Lakas	Gloria Macapagal Arroyo	233,042	100.00
Total votes		233,042	100.00
Lakas hold			

=== 2025 ===
2025 Philippine House of Representatives election in Pampanga's 2nd district
Party	Candidate	Votes	%
Lakas	Gloria Macapagal Arroyo (incumbent)	227,254	100.00
Total votes		227,254	100.00
Lakas hold			

== See also ==
- Legislative districts of Pampanga

House of Representatives of the Philippines
Preceded by Davao del Norte's 1st congressional district	Home district of the speaker of the House of Representatives; July 23, 2018 – June 30, 2019	Succeeded by Taguig–Pateros's 1st congressional district
