= Universidad Literaria y Cientifica de Filipinas =

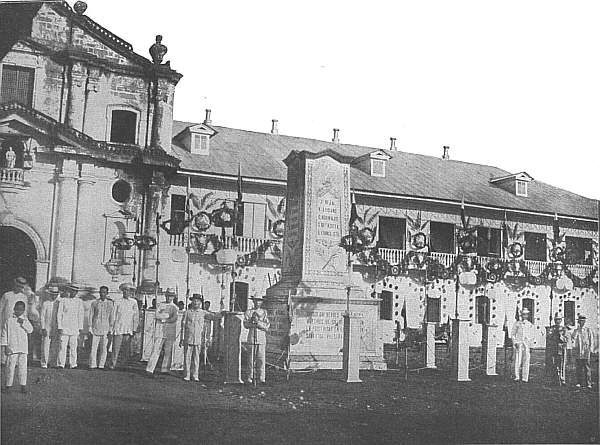
- San Fernando church, Pampanga in 1899
- Active: October 19, 1898–Late 1899
- Founder: Emilio Aguinaldo
- Religious affiliation: N/A (Nonsectarian)
- Rector: Joaquín González (1898–1899); León Maria Guerrero (1899)
- Location: Three historical locations in the Philippines: Navotas and Tambobong, Manila (initial) Barasoain Church Convent, Malolos, Bulacan San Sebastian Church Convent, Tarlac, Tarlac (last)
- Language: Spanish

The Universidad Literaria y Cientifica de Filipinas (lit. 'Literary and Scientific University of the Philippines'), simply known as the Universidad Literaria de Filipinas, was a short-lived university that was extant during the Philippine Revolution era.

== History ==
The Revolutionary Government of the Philippines led by President Emilio Aguinaldo established the Universidad Literaria y Cientifica de Filipinas through a presidential decree on October 19, 1898. It was originally situated in Navotas and Tambobong, prior to being moved to Malolos in Bulacan, more specifically the convent besides the Barasoain Church.

The university was dissolved shortly after the outbreak of the Philippine–American War in 1899.

After the Americans took over Malolos in March 1899, the university moved again to San Sebastian Church Convent in Tarlac, where the revolutionary government moved its capital. The revolutionary government transitioned to a guerilla movement by November 1899 and operations of the university consequentially came to a halt.

== Program ==
The university was intended to be secular in nature. Its program had a nationalistic streak, although it still devised the Spanish language as the medium of instruction. Students could take courses in law, medicine, pharmacy, and notary public.

== Administration ==
The university had two rectors throughout its history. The first was Joaquín González, a physician educated in Spain and a member of the Malolos Congress. The second and last rector was León Maria Guerrero, a historian, botanist and playwright.
