= Punsalan =

Punsalan is a surname. Notable people with this surname include:

- Elizabeth Punsalan (born 1971), American former competitive ice dancer
- Simeona Punsalan-Tapang (1922–2015), Filipina war veteran
- Vyanla Punsalan (born 2004), New Zealand chess player
