= Simeona Punsalan-Tapang =

Filipina revolutionary

Simeona Punsalan Tapang
- Born: July 1, 1922
- Died: June 30, 2015 (aged 92)
- Organization: Hukbalahap

Simeona Punsalan-Tapang (July 1, 1922 – June 30, 2015) also known as Kumander Guerrero, was a Filipina war veteran. She was a commander of the Hukbalahap guerilla that fought for the country during and after World War II.

== War ==
Before the war, Tapang worked as an organizer of the peasant organization -- Pambansang Katipunan ng mga Magsasaka ng Pilipinas (National Assembly of Farmers in the Philippines).

When the Imperial Japanese army invaded the country, Tapang learned that many local women were being kidnapped and raped to be comfort women. Because of this, she reached out to the Hukbalahap and joined the guerilla at 19 years old.

Due to her affiliations, Tapang was imprisoned by the Japanese government.

When she was released, she joined the Hukbalahap's Apalit Squadron 104 in November 1942. She served as captain until December 1943. The Apalit Squadron 104 was deemed as one of the guerilla's strongest groups, considering that it is one of the most battle-tested squadron. In 1944, she was promoted to major under the 1st Regiment, Second Battalion Staff, Regional Command 7.

Tapang recalled an incident as a captain, wherein her second in command refused to follow her order to form a V formation. She pointed her 37-cal. gun to him and spoke that he will have to obey, and so he did.

Tapang took part in the Battle of Mandibi in Candiba, Pampanga in 1944, and it was a successful fight against the Japanese. Tapang led several successful combats against Japanese forces in Arayat, Pampanga.

Tapang's first husband, a comrade-in-arms, was killed along with his team in an encounter in Candaba. Her second husband, also a Hukbalahap fighter, died during battle too.

When the Japanese was quelled from the Philippines, the Hukbalahap evolved as Hukbong Magpalaya ng Bayan(HMB). The movement persisted during the American occupation due to the arrest and killings of Hukbalahap members that fought against Japanese colonizers—instead of being recognized for their war efforts as allies. Thus, Tapang joined the HMB's Luzon Regional Command in Bataan. It was the movement's base of operations. There, she was captured together with her infant child.

Luis Taruc, the Hukbalahap's supreme leader, spoke of Tapang as “a big-bodied woman with a man’s strength, fond of wearing men’s clothes, adept at handling an automatic rifle, and able to hold command at the firing line.”

== Death ==
On June 30, 2015, Tapang died due to cardiac arrest. She was 92 years old.
