= Pampanga's at-large congressional district =

Former congressional district in the Philippines

Pampanga's at-large congressional district was the provincewide electoral district used to elect members of Philippine national legislatures in Pampanga before 1987.

Pampanga was initially composed of one representative district, wherein it elected four representatives, at large, to the Malolos Congress in 1898. It was later divided into two representative districts in 1907 for the Philippine Assembly; it remained so until 1941.

In the disruption caused by the Second World War, Pampanga was represented by two delegates in the National Assembly of the Japanese-sponsored Second Philippine Republic: one was the provincial governor (an ex officio member), while the other was elected through a citywide assembly of KALIBAPI members during the Japanese occupation of the Philippines. Upon the restoration of the Philippine Commonwealth in 1945, Pampanga's pre-war two-district representation was retained; this remained so until 1972.

The province and the chartered city of Angeles were represented in the Interim Batasang Pambansa as part of Region III from 1978 to 1984, and together elected four representatives at-large to the Regular Batasang Pambansa from 1984 to 1986. Pampanga (with the highly urbanized city of Angeles) was redistricted into four congressional districts under the new Constitution which took effect on February 7, 1987, and elected members to the restored House of Representatives starting that same year.

== Representation history ==
#	Term of office		National Assembly	Seat A				Seat B				Seat C				Seat D			
#	Start	End	National Assembly	Image	Member	Party	Electoral history	Image	Member	Party	Electoral history	Image	Member	Party	Electoral history	Image	Member	Party	Electoral history
=== Pampanga's at-large district for the Malolos Congress ===
District created June 18, 1898.
–	September 15, 1898	March 23, 1901	1st		Joaquín González	Independent	Appointed.		Ramón Henson	Independent	Appointed.		Enrique Macapinlac	Independent	Appointed.		José Rodriguez Infante	Independent	Appointed.
#	Term of office		National Assembly	Seat A				Seat B											
#	Start	End	National Assembly	Image	Member	Party	Electoral history	Image	Member	Party	Electoral history								
=== Pampanga's at-large district for the National Assembly (Second Philippine Republic) ===
District re-created September 7, 1943.
–	September 25, 1943	February 2, 1944	1st		Félix B. Bautista	KALIBAPI	Elected in 1943.		Eligio Lagman	KALIBAPI	Appointed as an ex officio member.								
District dissolved into Pampanga's 1st and 2nd districts.
#	Term of office		Batasang Pambansa	Seat A				Seat B				Seat C				Seat D			
#	Start	End	Batasang Pambansa	Image	Member	Party	Electoral history	Image	Member	Party	Electoral history	Image	Member	Party	Electoral history	Image	Member	Party	Electoral history
=== Pampanga's at-large district for the Regular Batasang Pambansa ===
District re-created February 1, 1984.
–	July 23, 1984	March 25, 1986	2nd		Aber Canlas	KBL	Elected in 1984.		Rafael Lazatin	UNIDO	Elected in 1984.		Emigdio Lingad	UNIDO	Elected in 1984.		Juanita Nepomuceno	UNIDO	Elected in 1984.
District dissolved into Pampanga's 1st and 2nd districts.

== See also ==
- Legislative districts of Pampanga
