= Joaquín González (politician) =

Filipino politician

Dr. Joaquín González
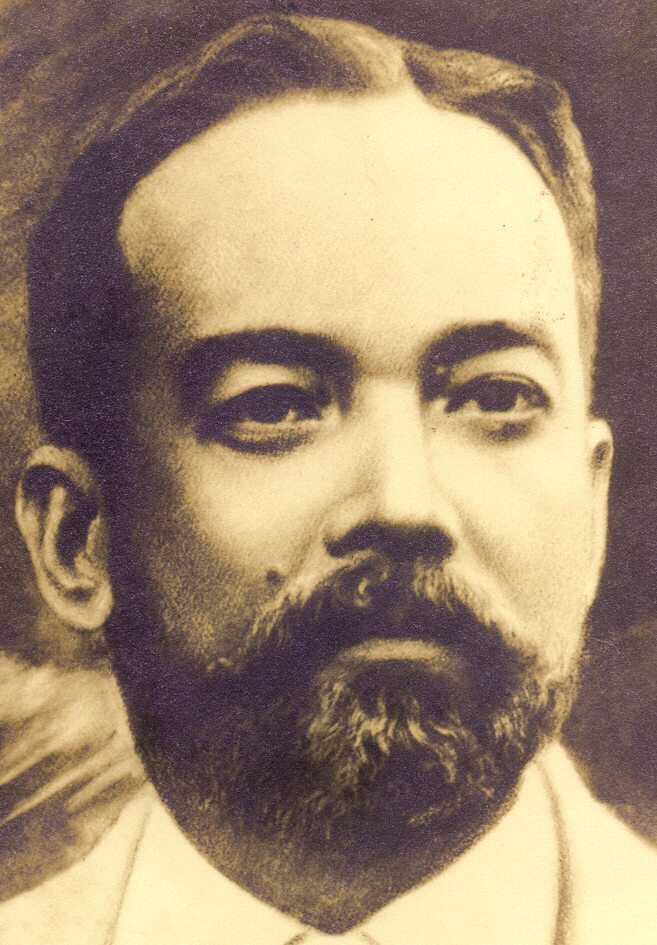

Member of the Malolos Congress from Pampanga
- In office September 15, 1898 – November 13, 1899 Serving with Jose Infante, Ramon Henson, and Enrique Macapinlac

Personal details
- Born: July 22, 1853 Baliuag, Bulacan, Captaincy General of the Philippines
- Died: September 21, 1900 (aged 47) Malate, Manila, Philippine Islands

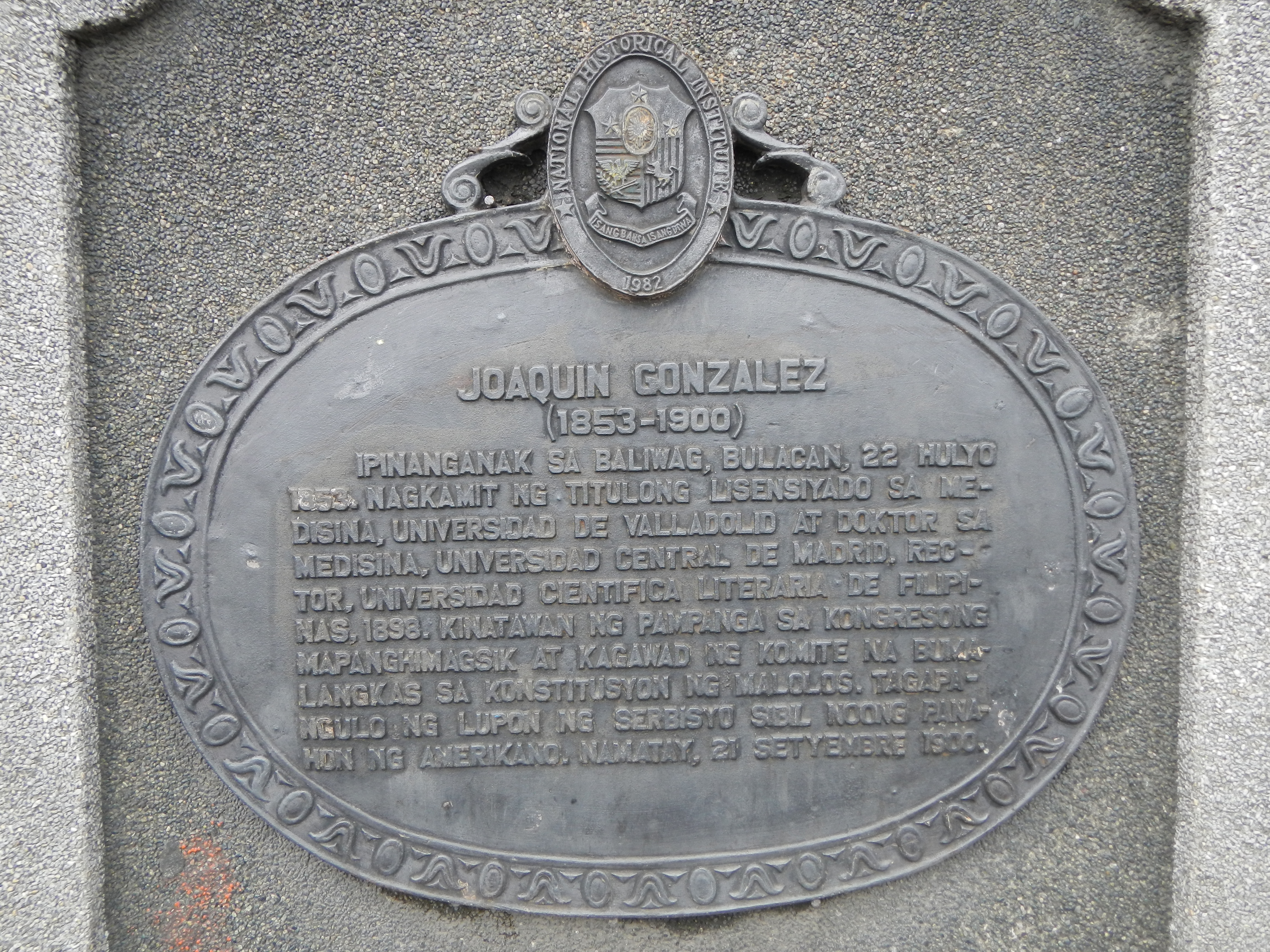
Dr. Joaquin Gonzalez (1982 NHI historical marker, Baliuag, Bulacan).

Joaquín González (July 22, 1853 – September 21, 1900) was a Filipino politician and a member of the Malolos Congress that wrote the Malolos Constitution, the first Philippine constitution, after the country declared independence from Spain in 1898. He was one of two elected delegates representing the province of Pampanga, the other being José Rodríguez Infante. Along with Felipe Calderón y Roca, the main author of the constitution, Dr. González was on a committee that debated over each article of the charter from October 25 to November 29, 1898.

== Early life and training ==
Dr. González was a Spanish mestizo born out of the union of Fray Fausto López Palomino OSA a Spaniard from Valladolid, Spain and María Amparo "Mariquita" González y de los Ángeles from Baliuag, Bulacan. He was trained as a Doctor of Medicine in Spain at the Universidad de Valladolid and the Universidad Central de Madrid (now the Complutense University of Madrid). He later attended the Ophthalmology Institute of Dr Louis de Wecker in Paris, France, to specialize in eye diseases. His compatriot Dr José Rizal studied in the same institute years later and Dr de Wecker told him that another Filipino, Dr Joaquin Gonzalez, had preceded him there.

== Career ==
Unexpectedly, the Spanish mestizo and member of the Ilustrado (the moneyed and educated class), Dr González actively supported the Katipunan during the Revolution from 1896 to 1899; he was an offspring of a union not unlike that of the fictional Padre Dámaso and the married Doña Pía Alba de de los Santos in José Rizal's banned novel, Noli Me Tángere. He believed in the Revolution and was a friend of its more educated members, as well as several of its generals. Dr González was familiar with General Emilio Aguinaldo (the country's first acknowledged president), Don Felipe Buencamino Sr. (widower of Doña Juana Arnedo, who died in 1883 and was the niece of Doña Florencia Sioco, Dr Gonzalez's wife), and other leaders of the movement.

Dr González possessed contraband copies of Rizal's Noli Me Tángere and its sequel, El Filibusterismo, as well as writings of Madrid-based propagandistas, whom he knew socially. His house in Barrio Sulipan, Apalit, Pampanga, was the venue for clandestine meetings of the organization. The Katipunan's siege of Macabebe and other offensives in the province were planned in his house; he and his family viewed that attack from there using strong binoculars. His mother-in-law, Doña Matea Rodríguez, was the largest contributor to the Katipunan in Pampanga. Dr González accompanied Katipunero troops in their attacks around Pampanga and neighbouring Bulacan, tending to their wounds. During one skirmish, he was mistaken for the enemy because of his mestizo features, but on introducing himself fluently in the Bulaqueño dialect of Tagalog, the commanding general cleared him and said: "Not only is he one of us, he is my townmate!"

On October 19, 1898, President Aguinaldo appointed Dr González as the first rector/president of the Universidad Cientifico-Literaria de Filipinas. The university had faculties of civil and criminal law, as well as medicine and surgery. He taught legal medicine, toxicology, and public hygiene.

In April 1899, Dr González joined the seven-member Permanent Commission of the National Assembly under the Malolos Constitution. The body had oversight powers over the president, its legislators, Cabinet secretaries, the Chief Justice, and the Solicitor-General during adjournment of the Assembly.

== Family ==
The Spanish mestizo Gonzalez clans (Gonzalez Doble Zeta) of San Rafael and Baliuag towns, Bulacan, and Bayambang and Bautista towns, Pangasinan trace their ur-ancestor to a Spanish soldier, Sr D _____ Gonzalez, who was given a land grant in the area between San Rafael and Baliuag towns in Bulacan in the early 1700s.

D Vicente Gonzalez and Da Venancia de Los Angeles of Baliuag, Bulacan had many children, among them, Maria Amparo ("Mariquita") and three sons all named Francisco --- Francisco Gonzalez Reinado ("Francisco Balbas"), Francisco Gonzalez ("Francisco Kalbo"), and Francisco Gonzalez ("Francisco Pugot"). The three brothers named Francisco Gonzalez purchased big portions of the huge British, Smith Bell & Co "Hacienda Esperanza" (55,000 hectares spread out over Pangasinan, Tarlac, Nueva Ecija, and Bulacan) and migrated to Bayambang, Pangasinan where they raised their families.

Fray Fausto Lopez y Palominas OSA of Valladolid, Spain and Da Maria Amparo Gonzalez y de Los Angeles ("Mariquita") of Baliuag, Bulacan had six children: Soledad (married Mariano Gonzales), Jose (married Francisca Carrillo y Arriola, daughter of Fray Arriola OSA, another Augustinian), Dr Joaquin (married Florencia Sioco y Rodriguez), Rita (married Jose Llora; they returned to Spain), Carmen (spinster), and Francisco (married Maria Lloret, 14-year-old daughter of a Spanish ship captain).

Dr Joaquin Gonzalez y Lopez married Florencia Sioco y Rodríguez (1860–1925), youngest of the three daughters of D Josef Sioco of barrio Sulipan, Apalit and his second wife Da Matea Rodriguez y Tuason of barrio Santa Ines, Bacolor, Pampanga (Da Francisca Sioco, Da Sabina Sioco de Escaler [1858-1950], Da Florencia Sioco de Gonzalez).

Dr Joaquin and Da Florencia had ten sons: Fernando Leonardo (married Clementina Elizalde y Cacnio of San Luis, Pampanga), Dr Jesus Lope (married Ysidora Espiritu y Dungo of barrio San Vicente, Apalit, Pampanga; married Mercedes Veloso of Palo, Leyte), Emilio Cosme (married Rosario Valdes y Liongson of Bacolor, Pampanga), Atty Augusto Diosdado, father of former Secretary of Education Andrew Gonzalez (married Marina Escaler y Sioco; married Rosario Lucia Arnedo y Espiritu; both of barrio Sulipan, Apalit, Pampanga), Octavio Florencio (died at 10 years old), Dr Virgilio Rufino (married Rosario Singson y Chiong-Veloso of Cebu), Atty Francisco Javier Eligio (married Josefa Mercado y Espiritu of barrio Sulipan, Apalit, Pampanga), Bienvenido Maria, 6th President of the University of the Philippines (married Concepcion Rafols y Miravalles from the Visayas), Joaquin Jorge (married Julia Salgado y Mendoza of San Fernando, Pampanga; married Luz Manankil y Elizalde of San Luis, Pampanga), and Fausto Felix, Congressman of Pampanga (married Amparo de la Rama of Bacolod, Negros Occidental; married Pastora Cordero y Gomez of Angeles, Pampanga).

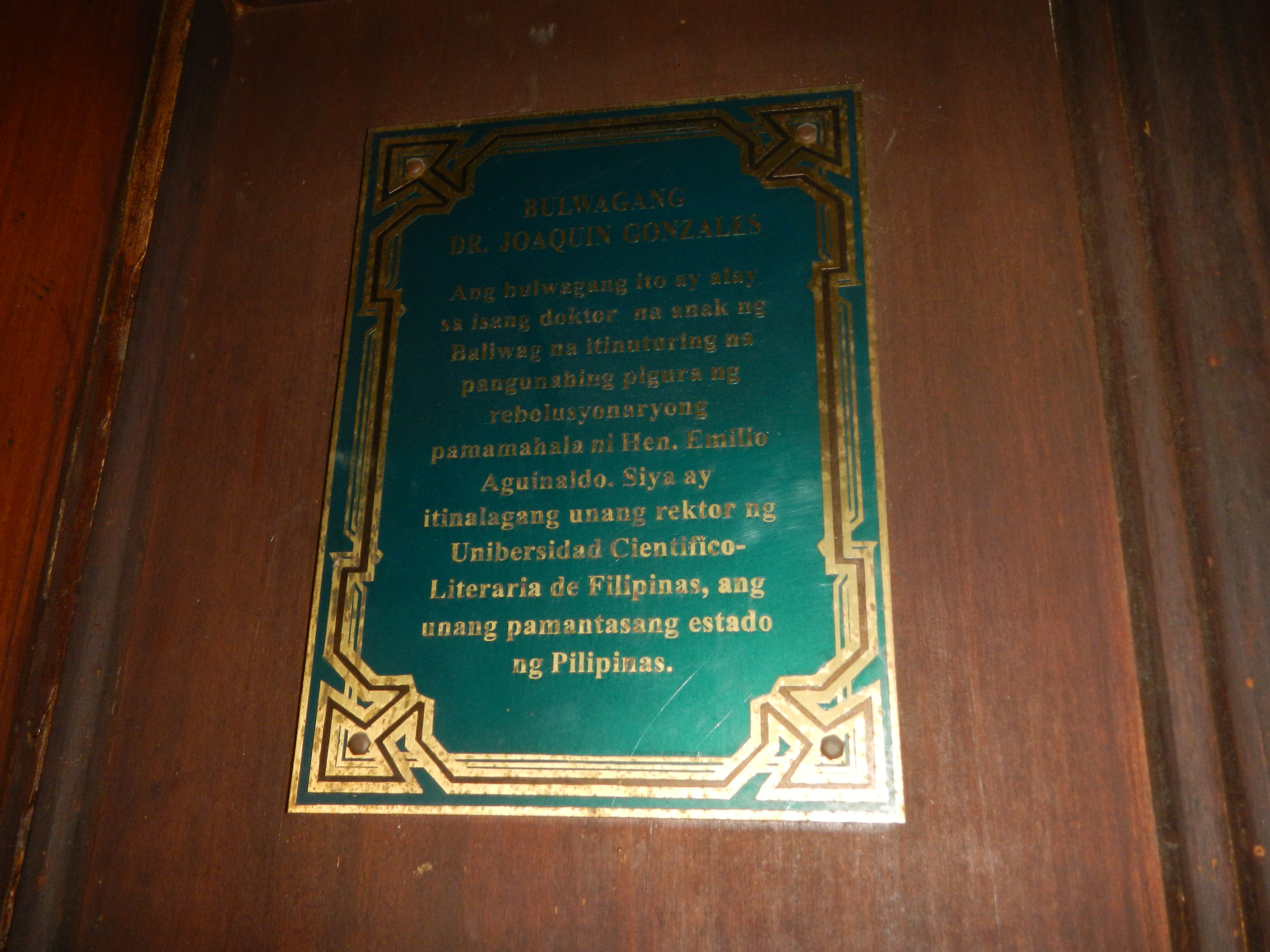
González' marker Baliwag Museum and Library

According to the memoirs of Dr Bienvenido Ma Gonzalez, his maternal grandfather D Josef Sioco (1786–1864) was the richest man in Pampanga province during his lifetime, owning many farmlands in Pampanga and Bulacan and a roomful of gold coins in his barrio Sulipan, Apalit residence. According to the memoirs of Zoilo Hilario, treasurer of the Katipunan in Pampanga, Da Matea Rodriguez y Tuason viuda de Josef Sioco, viuda de Juan Arnedo-Cruz (1835–1918) was the single biggest contributor to the Katipunan in Pampanga, contributing thousands of gold coins to the cause, more than any of the big hacenderos of Bacolor, San Fernando, Mexico, and Guagua towns.

(Don Josef Sioco [1786-1864] first married Da _____ Carlos also of barrio Sulipan, Apalit. Their only daughter, Da Maria de la Paz Sioco y Carlos [+1897], became the second wife of Capitan Joaquin Arnedo y Tanjutco [+1897] also of barrio Sulipan, Apalit. Capitan Joaquin Arnedo and Capitana Maria de la Paz Sioco lived in a famous villa called "La Sulipena" in barrio Sulipan, Apalit, Pampanga and because of their legendary hospitality became the most renowned and most documented hosts from the Spanish period.)

== Death ==
Dr. González died of acute appendicitis in Malate, Manila, on September 21, 1900. A grand state of national mourning was declared, his funeral cortège attended by the whole Civil Commission led by its first president and American governor-general, William Howard Taft; American military authorities; various notable Filipinos; and members of the general public. The main road of Apalit was later named "Dr Joaquín L. González Avenue" in his memory.

== See also ==
- Manuel, E Arsenio, Dictionary of Philippine Biography.
