= San Luis, Pampanga =

Municipality in Pampanga, Philippines

San Luis
- Municipality
- Municipality of San Luis
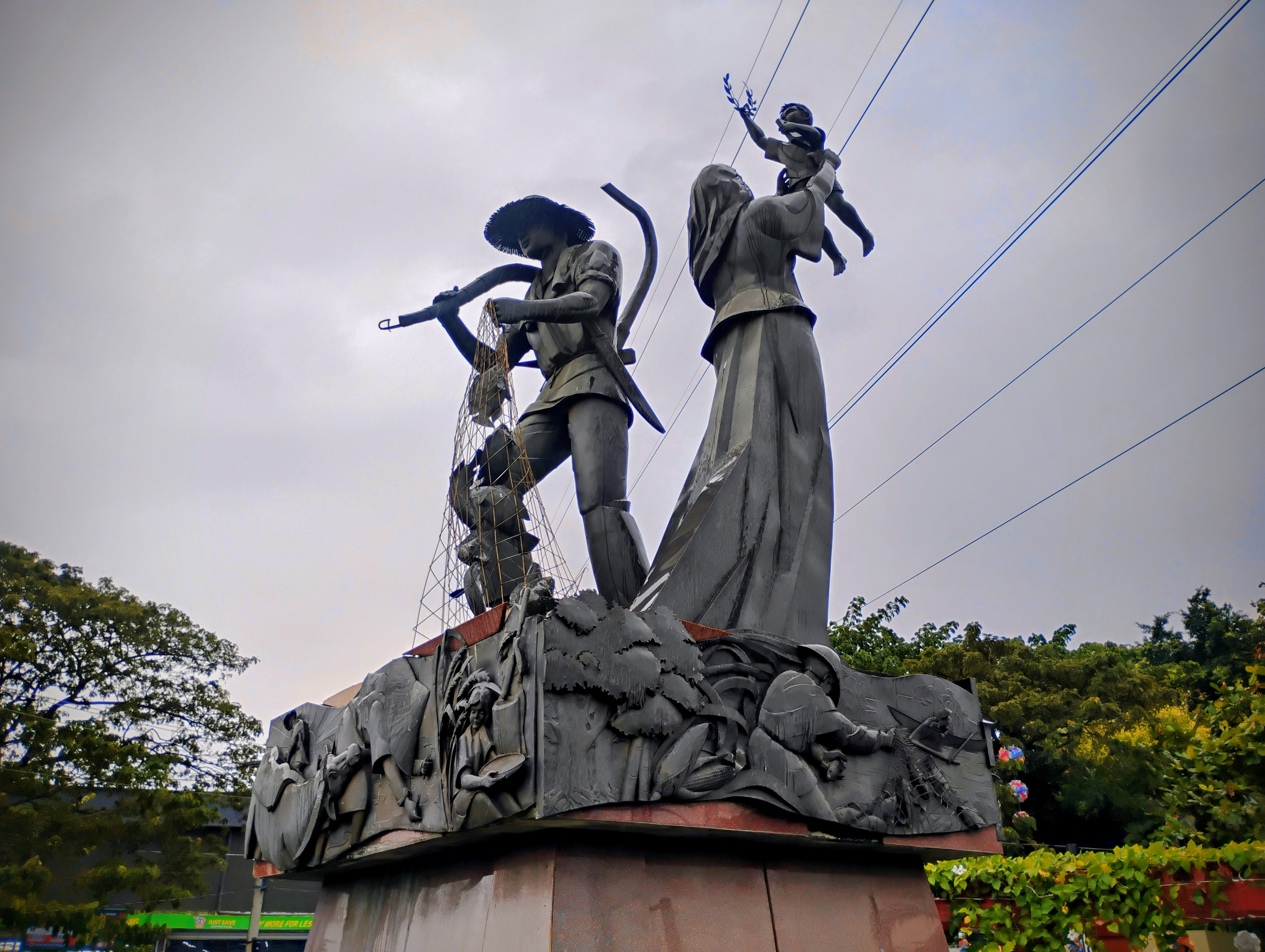
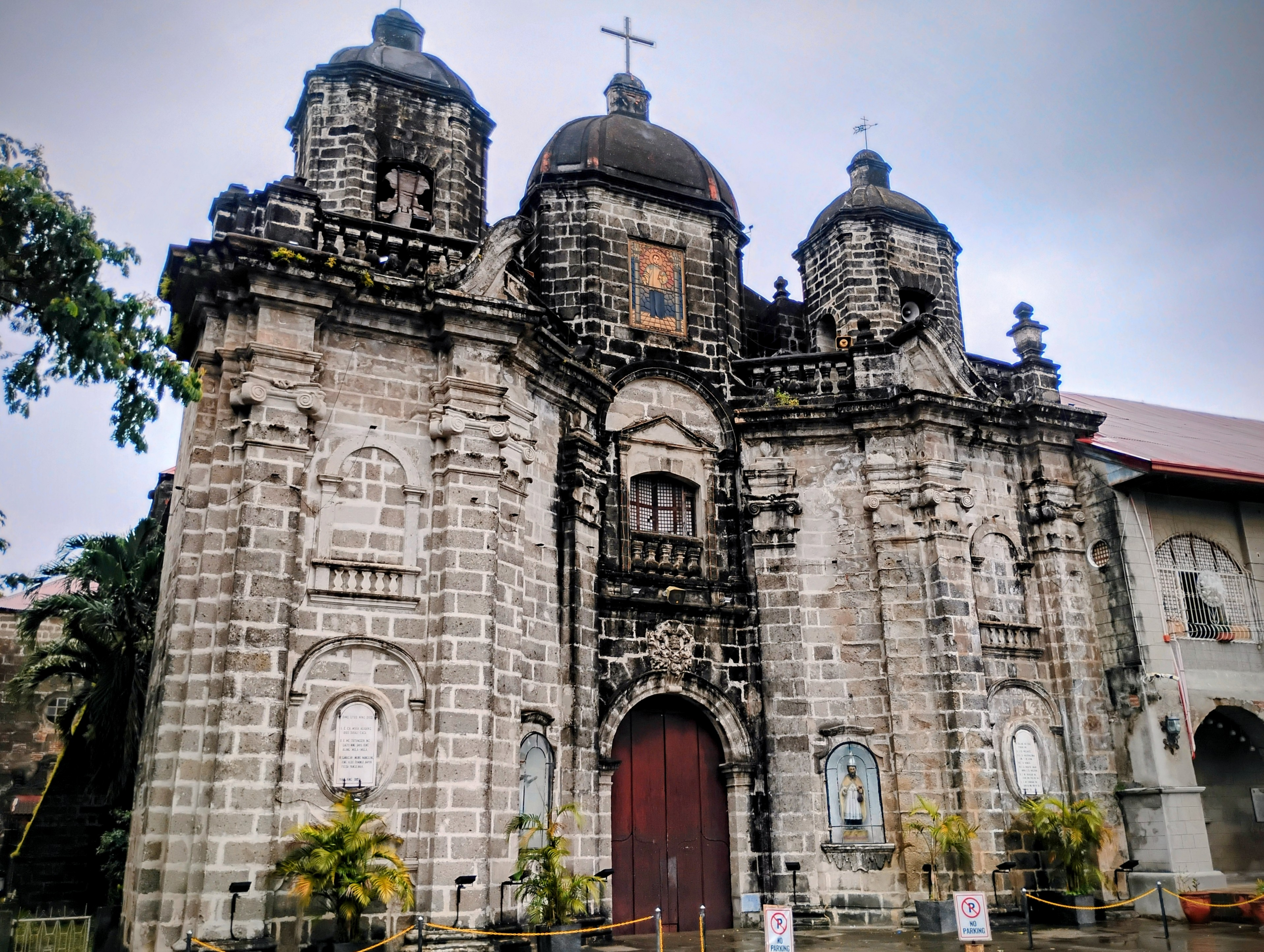
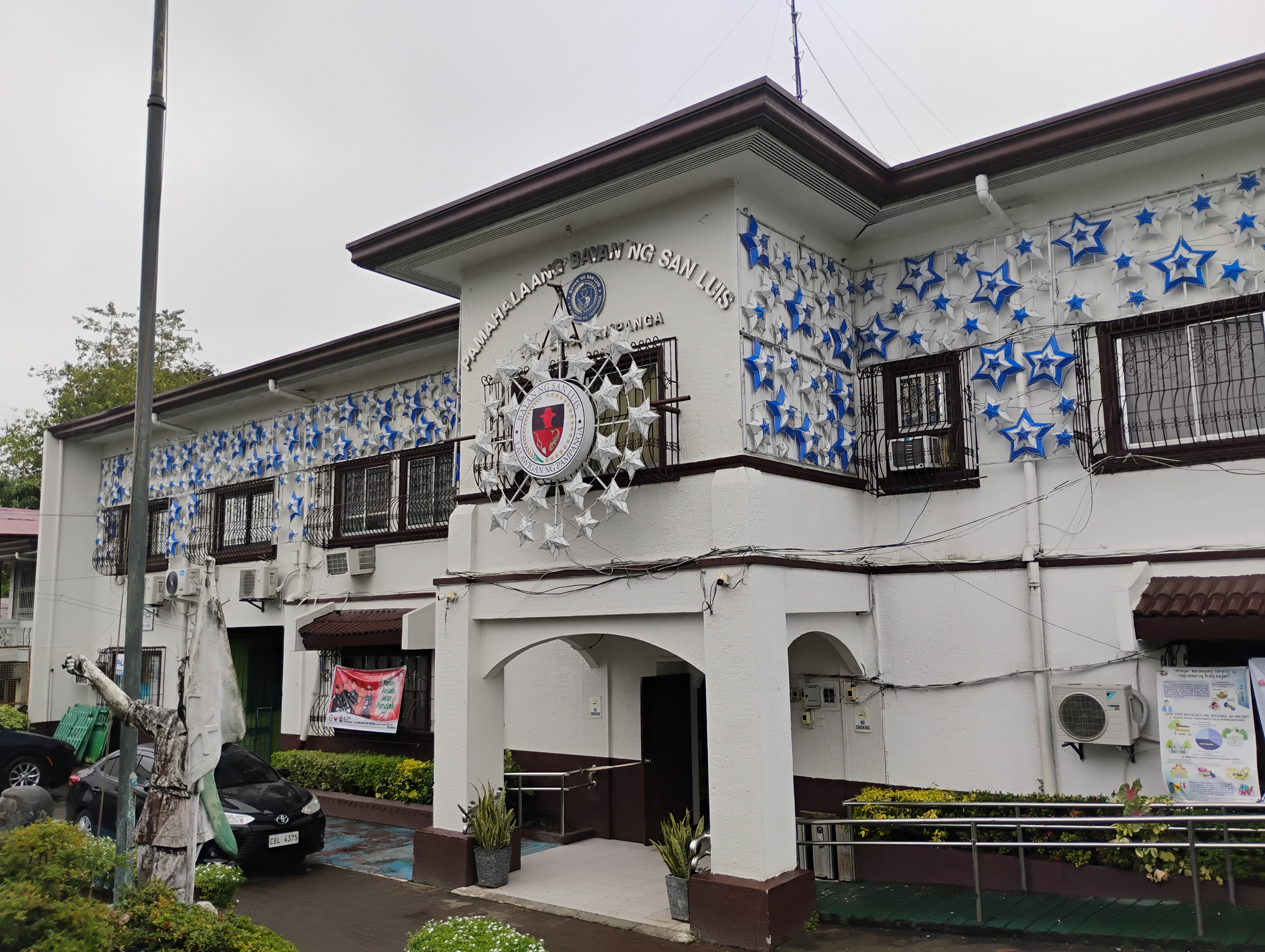
- Luis Taruc Monument Saint Aloysius Gonzaga Parish Church Old San Luis Municipal Hall

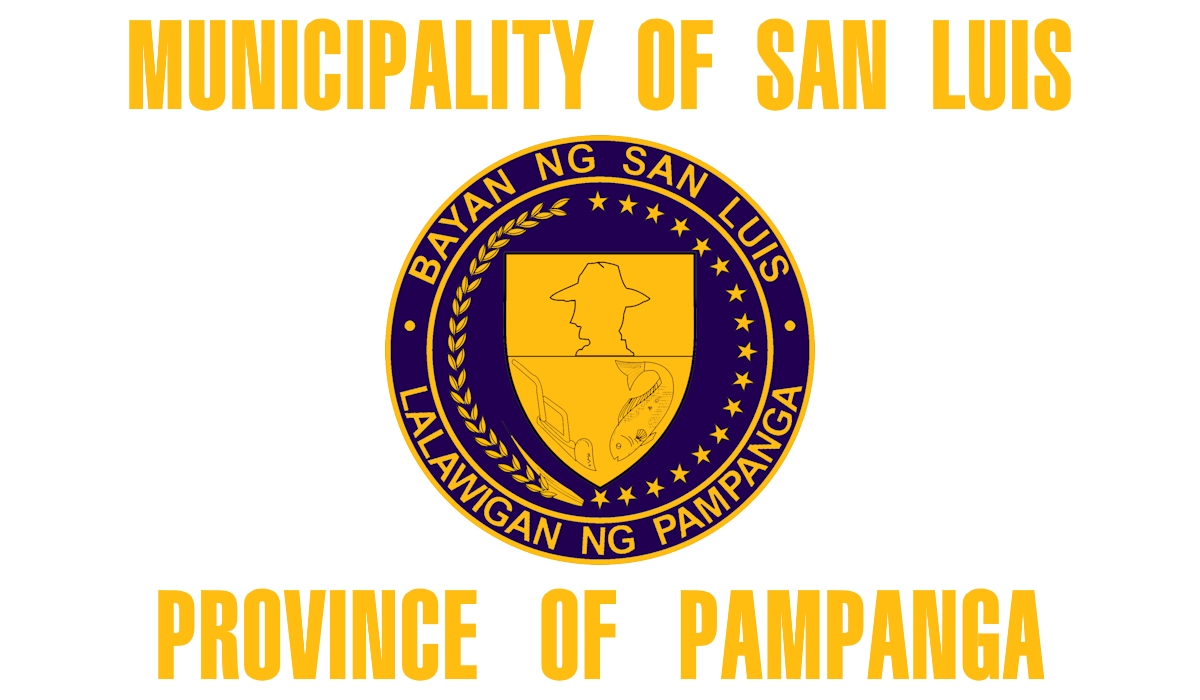
- Flag Seal

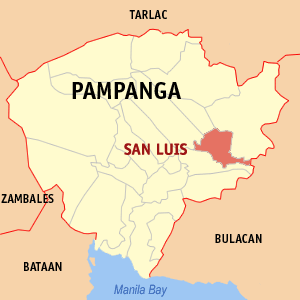
- Map of Pampanga with San Luis highlighted
- Interactive map of San Luis
- Location within the Philippines
- Coordinates: 15°02′24″N 120°47′31″E
- Country: Philippines
- Region: Central Luzon
- Province: Pampanga
- District: 4th district
- Founded: 1761
- Named for: St. Aloysius Gonzaga
- Barangays: 17 (see Barangays)

Government
  - Type: Sangguniang Bayan
  - Mayor: Jayson S. Sagum
  - Vice Mayor: Roman A. Sagum
  - Representative: Anna York P. Bondoc
  - Municipal Council: Members: Erwin G. Clarin; Leonardo S. Salas Jr.; Elpidio D. Mangalus; Edilberto I. Mangulabnan; Jerry S. Sagum; Venancio S. Macapagal; Florentino F. Ocampo Jr.; Jesus I. Cruz
  - Electorate: 38,585 voters (2025)

Area
  - Total: 56.83 km^{2} (21.94 sq mi)
- Elevation: 8.0 m (26.2 ft)
- Highest elevation: 25 m (82 ft)
- Lowest elevation: 2 m (6.6 ft)

Population (2024 census)
  - Total: 64,674
  - Density: 1,138/km^{2} (2,947/sq mi)
  - Households: 12,836

Economy
  - Income class: 2nd municipal income class
  - Poverty incidence: 8.95% (2023)
  - Revenue: ₱ 212.4 million (2024)
  - Assets: ₱ 690.3 million (2024)
  - Expenditure: ₱ 182.3 million (2024)
  - Liabilities: ₱ 129.9 million (2024)

Service provider
  - Electricity: Pampanga 1 Electric Cooperative (PELCO 1)
- Time zone: UTC+8 (PST)
- ZIP code: 2014
- PSGC: 0305417000
- IDD : area code: +63 (0)45
- Native languages: Kapampangan; Tagalog
- Feast date: June 21
- Patron saint: St. Aloysius Gonzaga

San Luis, officially the Municipality of San Luis (Kapampangan: Balen ning San Luis; Tagalog: Bayan ng San Luis), is a municipality in the province of Pampanga, Philippines. According to the 2024 census, it has a population of 64,674 people.

== History ==
San Luis was formerly referred to as San Nicolas de Cabagsac after its former vicar, Father Nicolas de Orduño. Cabagsa refers to a "place where plenty of fruit bats are caught". San Luis as a settlement was officially founded by Augustinian missionaries in 1742. Father Ambrosio de San Agustin was assigned as its first priest on April 25, 1744.

== Geography ==
=== Barangays ===
San Luis is politically subdivided into 17 barangays, as shown below. Each barangay consists of puroks and some have sitios.

- San Agustín
- San Carlos
- San Isidro
- San José
- San Juan
- San Nicolás
- San Roque
- San Sebastián
- Santa Catalina
- Santa Cruz Pambilog
- Santa Cruz Población
- Santa Lucia
- Santa Mónica
- Santa Rita
- Santo Niño
- Santo Rosario
- Santo Tomás

=== Climate ===
Climate data for San Luis, Pampanga
Month	Jan	Feb	Mar	Apr	May	Jun	Jul	Aug	Sep	Oct	Nov	Dec	Year
Mean daily maximum °C (°F)	28 (82)	29 (84)	31 (88)	33 (91)	32 (90)	31 (88)	30 (86)	29 (84)	29 (84)	30 (86)	30 (86)	28 (82)	30 (86)
Mean daily minimum °C (°F)	20 (68)	20 (68)	21 (70)	23 (73)	24 (75)	24 (75)	24 (75)	24 (75)	24 (75)	23 (73)	22 (72)	21 (70)	23 (72)
Average precipitation mm (inches)	6 (0.2)	4 (0.2)	6 (0.2)	17 (0.7)	82 (3.2)	122 (4.8)	151 (5.9)	123 (4.8)	124 (4.9)	99 (3.9)	37 (1.5)	21 (0.8)	792 (31.1)
Average rainy days	3.3	2.5	3.6	6.6	17.7	22.2	25.2	23.7	23.2	17.9	9.2	5.2	160.3
Source: Meteoblue

== Demographics ==
Population census of San Luis

Year	Pop.	±% p.a.
1903	10,067	—
1918	9,830	−0.16%
1939	10,966	+0.52%
1948	9,472	−1.61%
1960	14,873	+3.83%
1970	20,205	+3.11%
1975	23,866	+3.40%
1980	25,701	+1.49%

Year	Pop.	±% p.a.
1990	31,920	+2.19%
1995	36,005	+2.28%
2000	41,554	+3.12%
2007	47,517	+1.87%
2010	49,311	+1.36%
2015	54,106	+1.78%
2020	58,551	+1.68%
2024	64,674	+2.42%

Source: Philippine Statistics Authority

In the 2024 census, the population of San Luis was 64,674 people, with a density of 1,100 inhabitants per square kilometre or 2,800 inhabitants per square mile.

Like other municipalities and cities in Pampanga, its people are mostly Kapampangan.

=== Religion ===
Roman Catholicism remains the predominant faith of the townsfolk. Other Christian denominations, such as Iglesia ni Cristo, the United Methodist Church, Members Church of God International, Evangelicals, Ang Iglesia Metodista sa Pilipinas, Baptists, and Born Again Christianity can be found in the municipality.

== Economy ==
Poverty incidence of San Luis (%)

Source: Philippine Statistics Authority

Transportation, trade and commerce in San Luis is concentrated at the town center where the public market, cockpit, municipal hall, church, schools, hospital, clinics, and commercial spaces are situated.

== Government ==
=== Local government ===
The municipal government is divided into three branches: executive, legislative and judiciary. The executive branch is composed of the mayor and the barangay captains for the barangays. The legislative branch is composed of the Sangguniang Bayan (town assembly), Sangguniang Barangay (barangay council), and the Sangguniang Kabataan for the youth sector. The judicial branch is administered solely by the Supreme Court of the Philippines.

The current mayor of San Luis, Dr. Jayson S. Sagum or also known as Dr. J, and the vice mayor is Mon A. Sagum.

== Landmarks ==
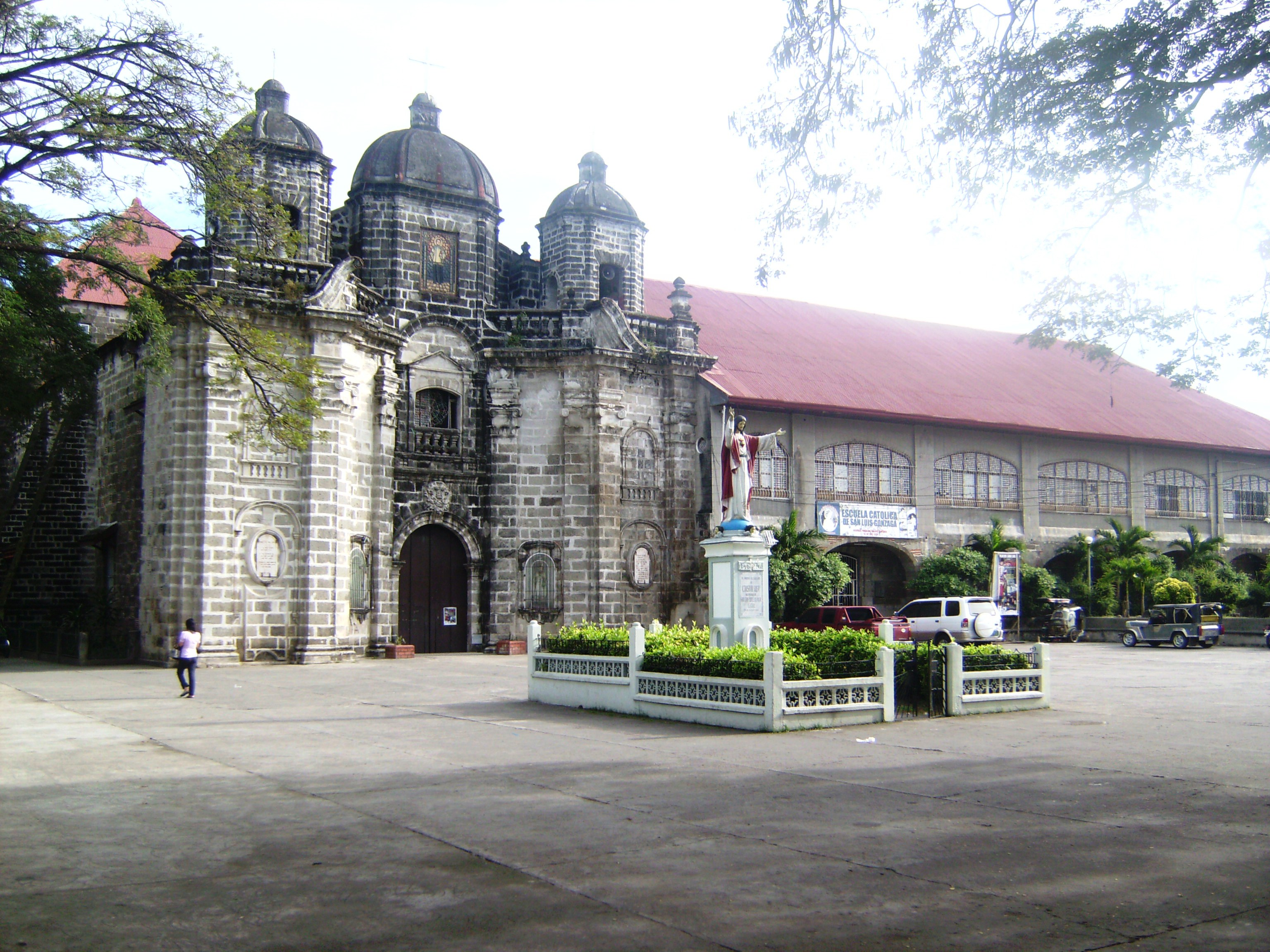
St. Aloysius Gonzaga Church (2008 photo)

=== St. Aloysius Gonzaga Church ===
Its façade can compare immeasurably with existing Spanish-style church edifices and architectural design. The church is located in a place that used to be called Cabagsac, referring to the proliferation of fruit bats. In fact, today, a fishnet is permanently installed high above the altar precisely to catch thousands of bats that are roosting inside the church. There is an ancient cemetery located in a hidden corner at the back of the church, with some tombstones dating back to the 1800s and bearing the names of the town's prominent families, including the Elizaldes, Ablazos, Francos, Tarucs, among others.

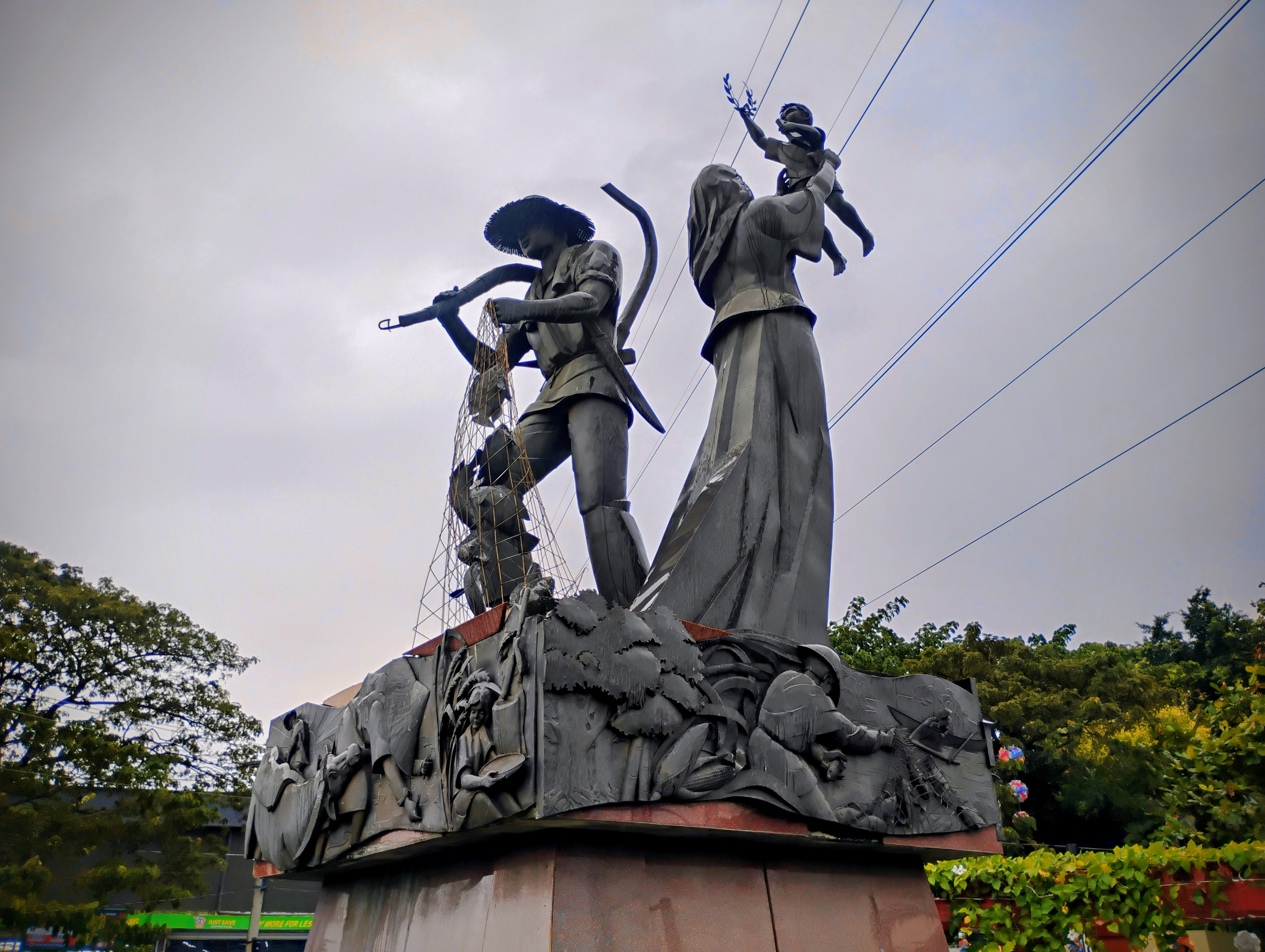
Luis M. Taruc Hukbalahap Monument

=== Luis M. Taruc Hukbalahap Monument ===
The Luis M. Taruc Hukbalahap Monument honors Luis Taruc, a leader of the Hukbalahap, a movement formed to resist the Japanese occupation of the Philippines during World War II. Throughout his life, he also fought for the rights of farmers and workers who faced inequality. His legacy remains as an important part of the town's historical identity.

== Education ==
The San Luis Schools District Office governs all educational institutions within the municipality. It oversees the management and operations of all private and public, from primary to secondary schools.

=== Primary and elementary schools ===
- Bebe Primary School
- CCM Educational Learning Center
- Don Emigdio Bondoc Elementary School
- San Agustin Elementary School
- San Carlos Elementary School
- San Isidro Elementary School
- San Jose Elementary School
- San Jose Proper Elementary School
- San Juan Elementary School
- San Luis Central School
- San Nicolas Elementary School
- San Roque Elementary School
- Sta. Catalina Elementary School
- Sta. Cruz Pambilog Elementary School
- Sta. Monica Elementary School
- Sta. Rita Elementary School
- Sto. Nino Elementary School
- Sto. Rosario Elementary School

=== Secondary schools ===
- Emigdio A. Bondoc High School
- Escuela Catholic de San Luis Gonzaga
- San Isidro National High School
- San isidro National High School (San Jose Integrated)
- San Juan-San Luis National High School
- San Juan-San Luis National High School (San Carlos)
- San Luis National High School
- Sta. Catalina High School

== Notable personalities ==
- Luis Taruc (June 21, 1913 – May 4, 2005), founder and leader of the Hukbalahap

== Gallery ==
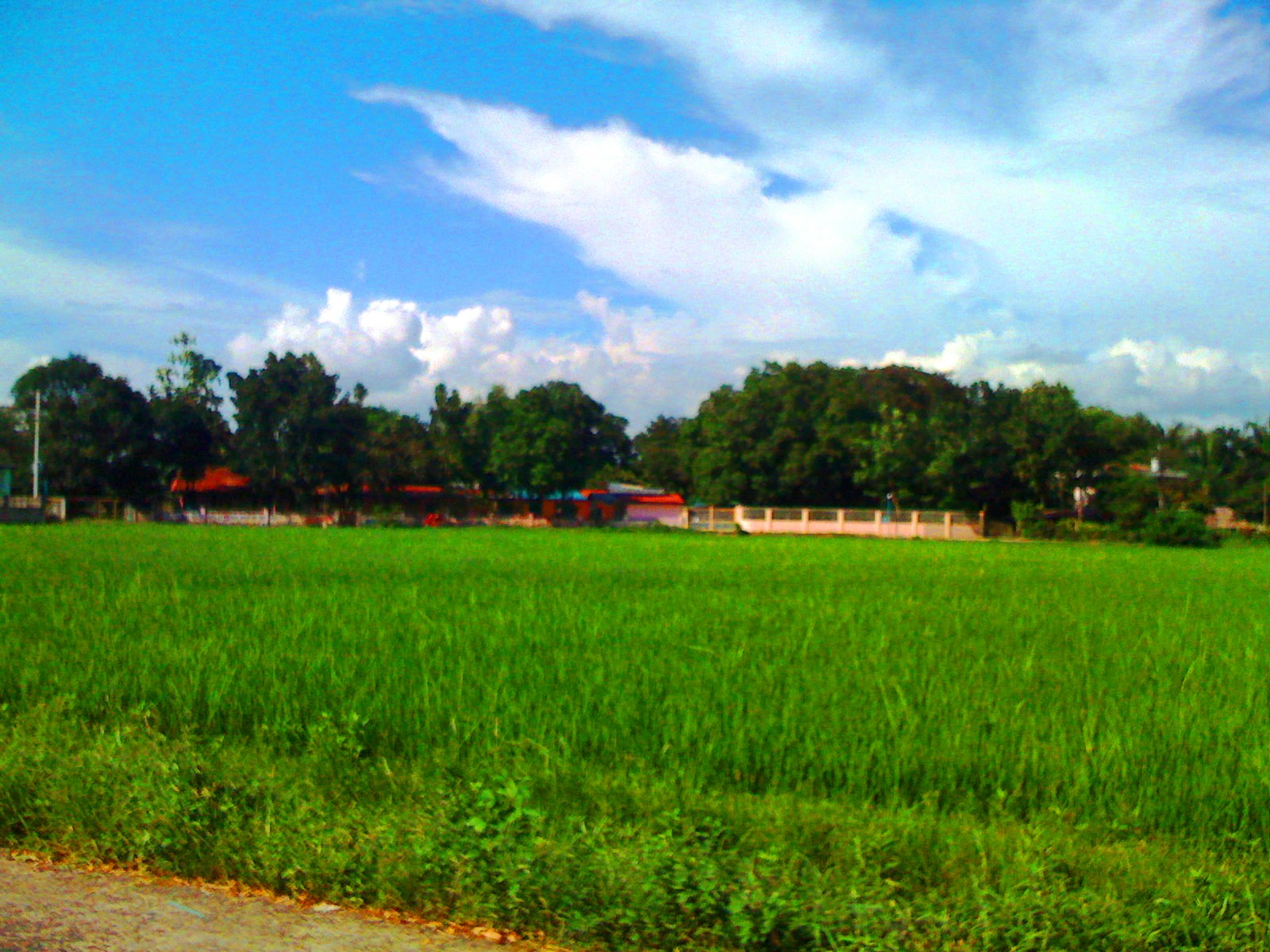
Rice Field in San Jose, San Luis

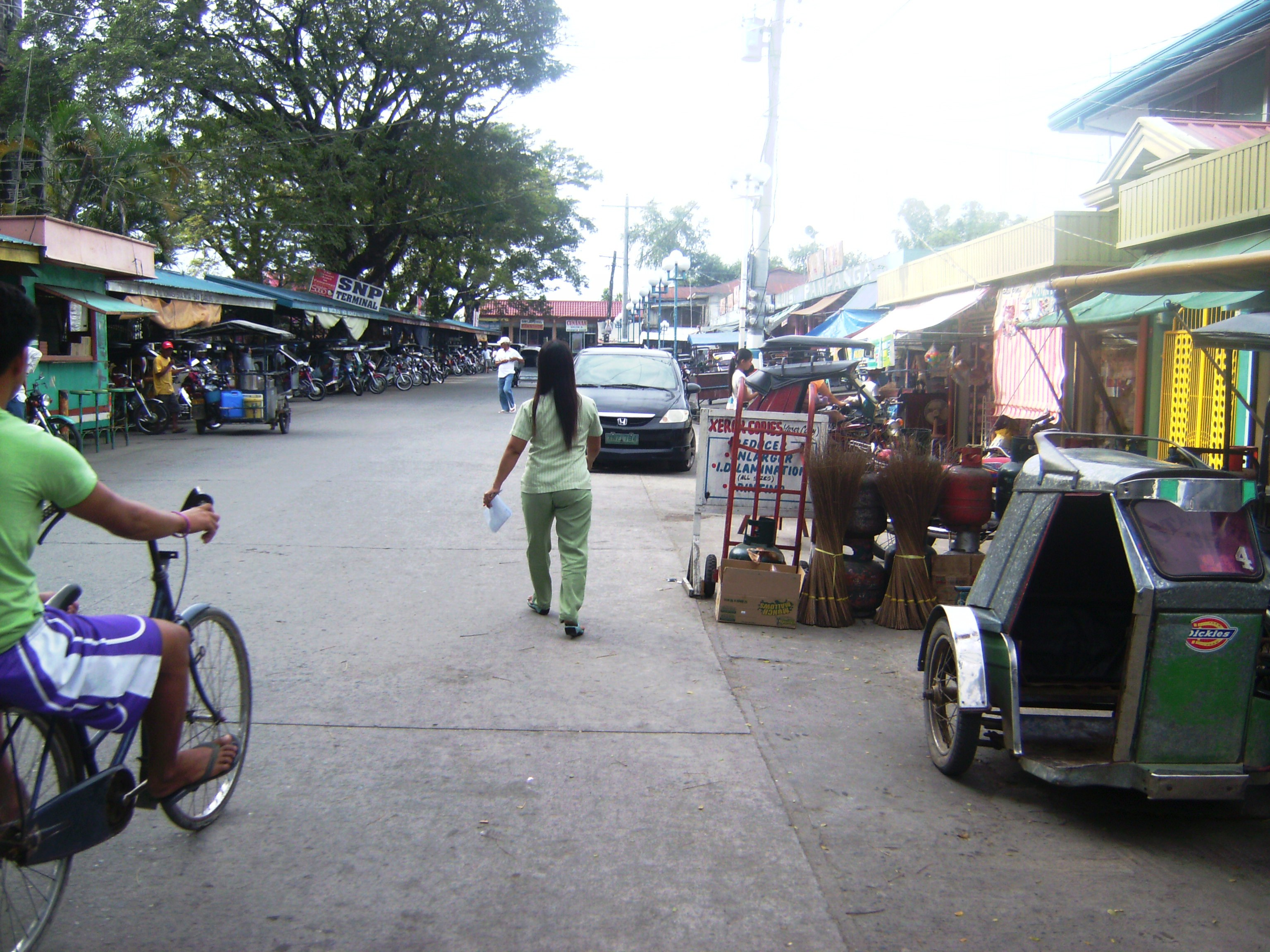
Downtown San Luis

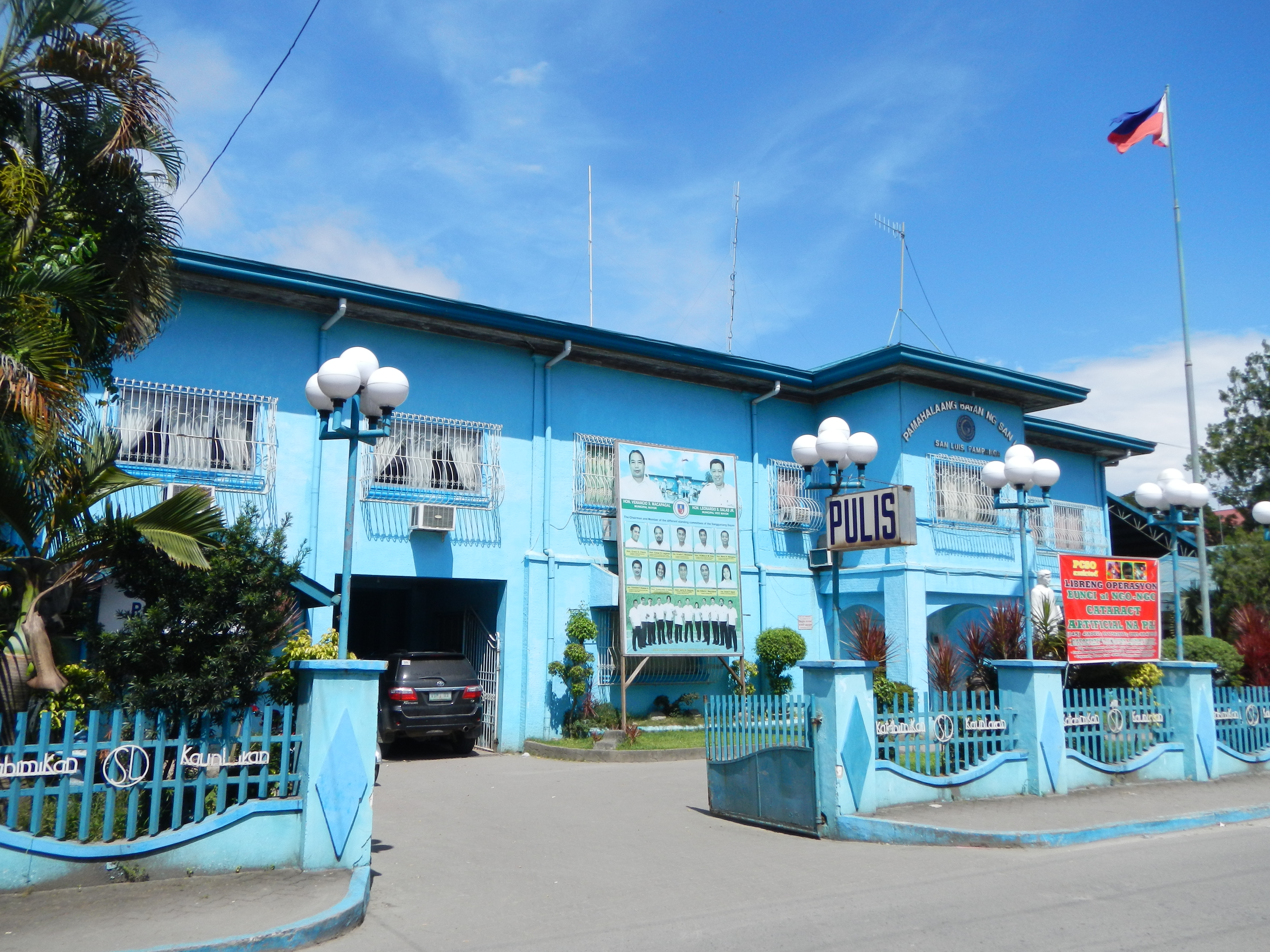
Municipal Hall of San Luis

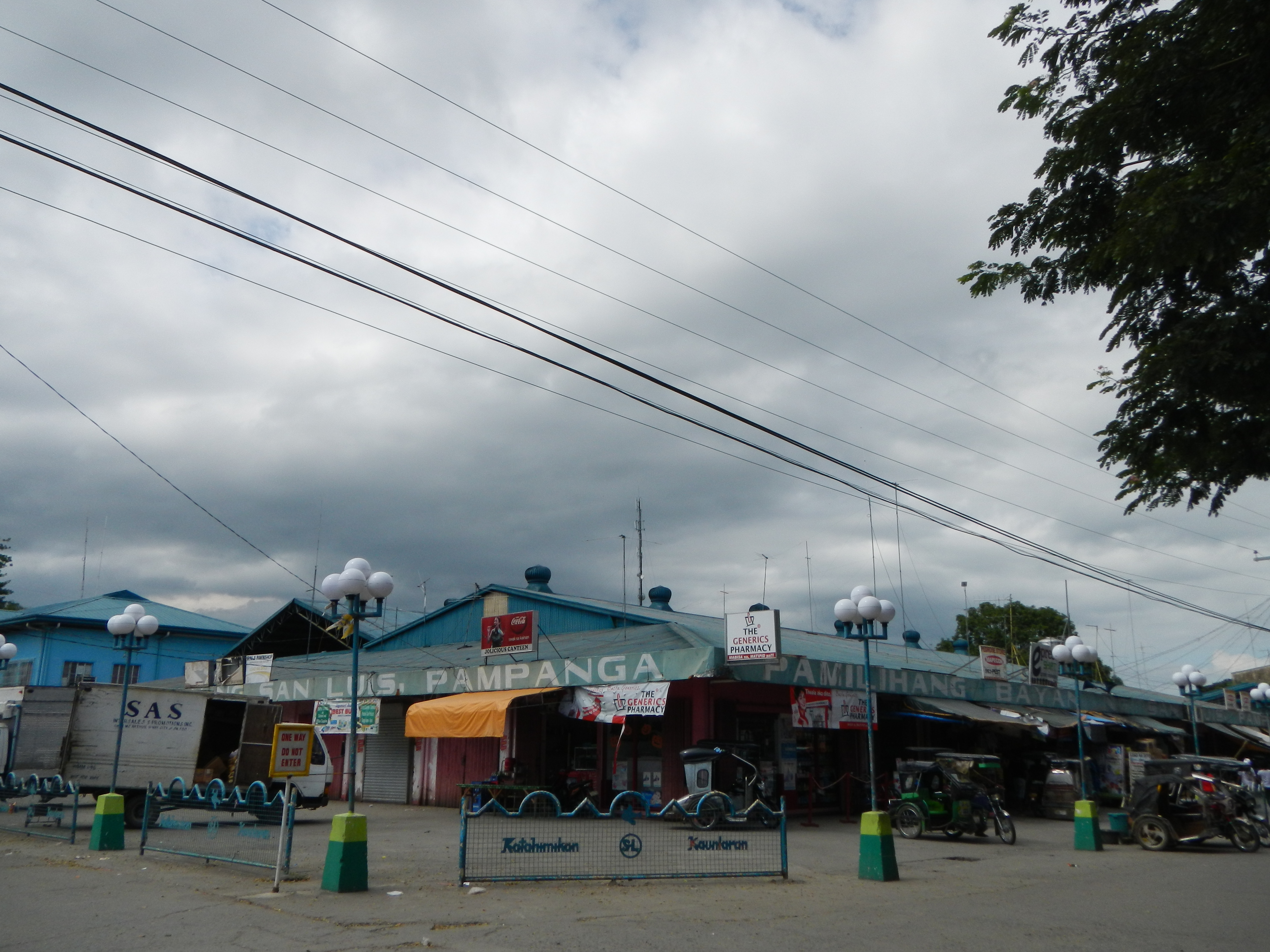
Public market

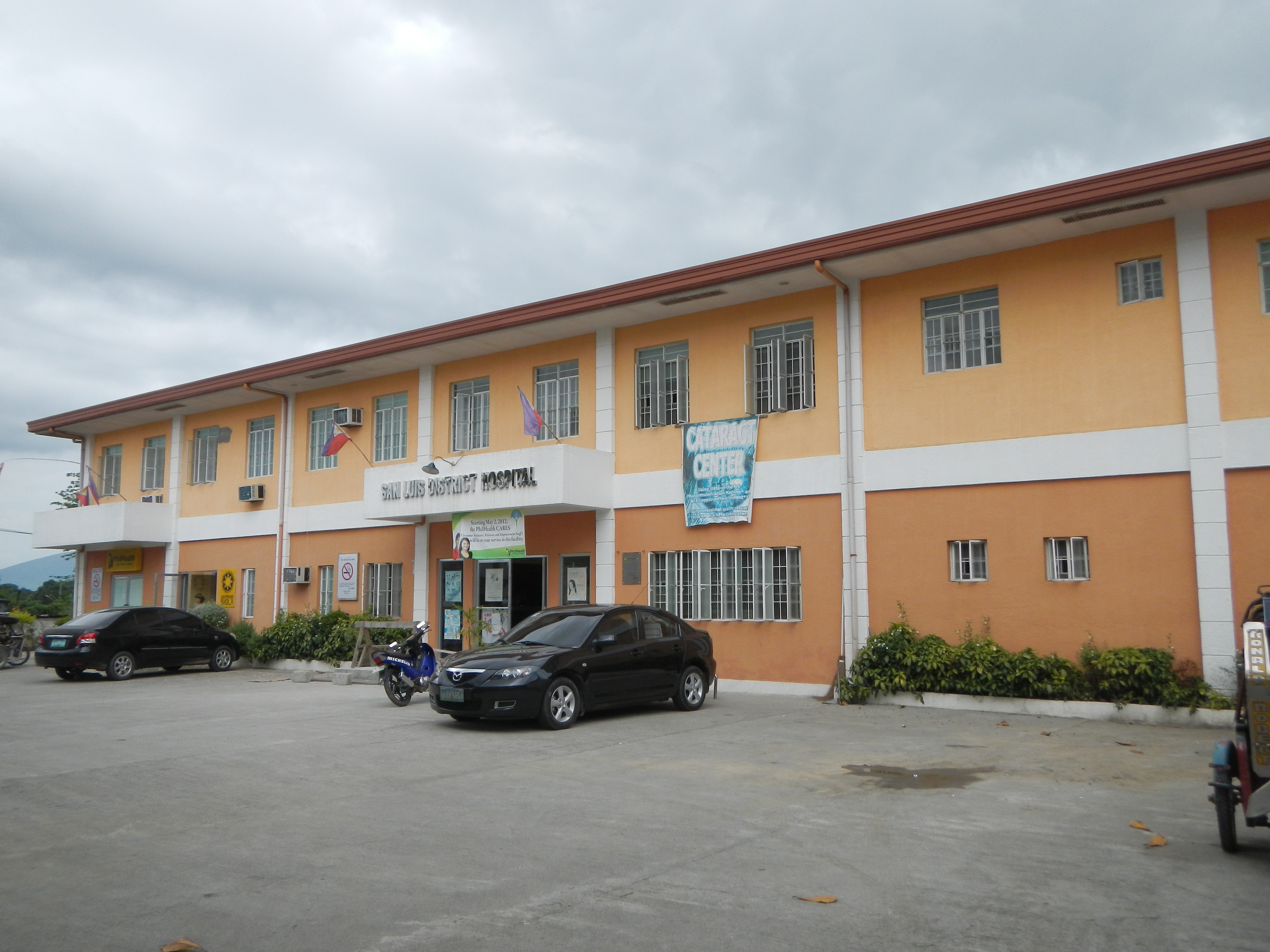
District Hospital
