= Arayat, Pampanga =

Municipality in Pampanga, Philippines

Arayat
- Municipality
- Municipality of Arayat
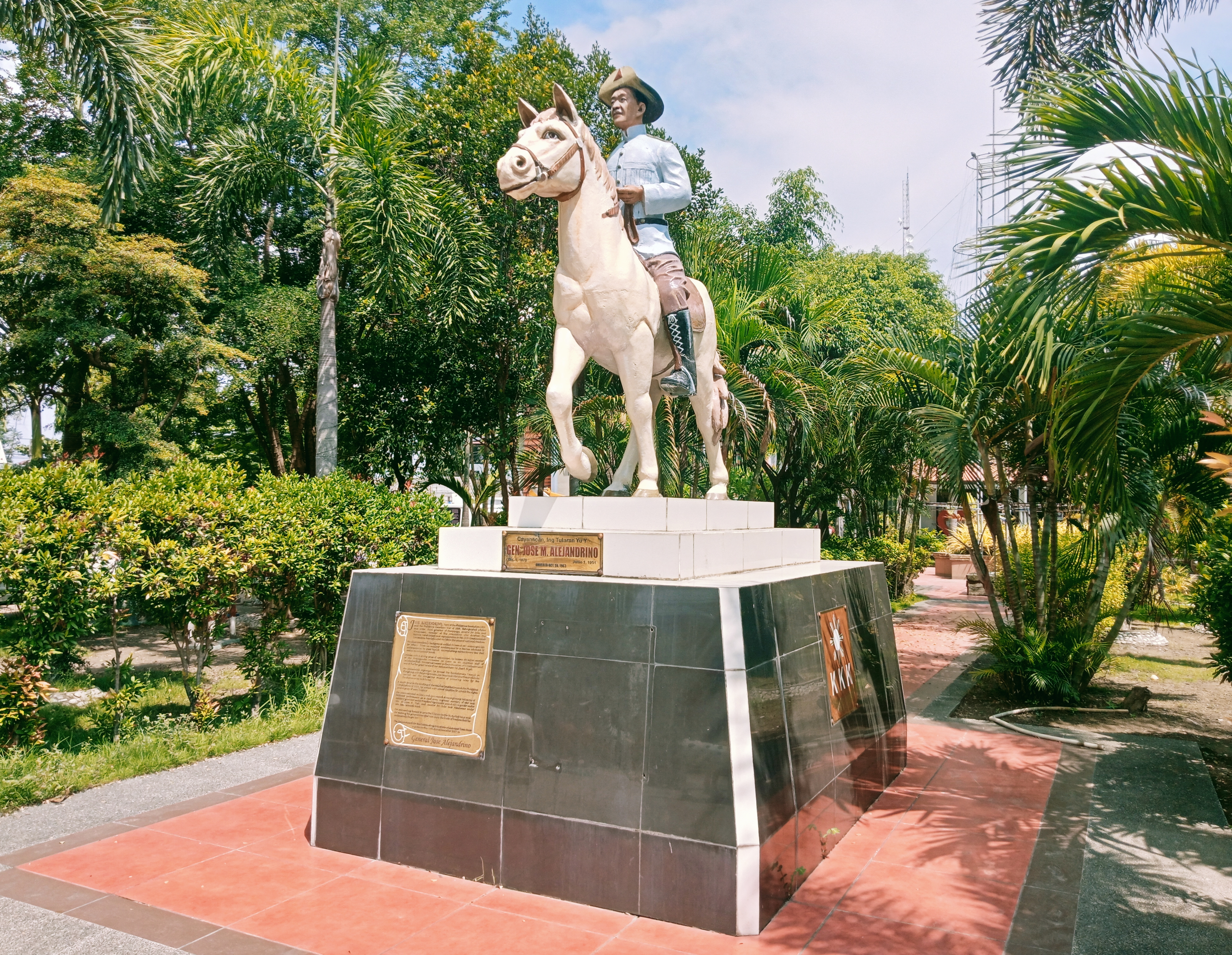
- Gen. Jose M. Alejandrino Monument in front of the Municipal Hall

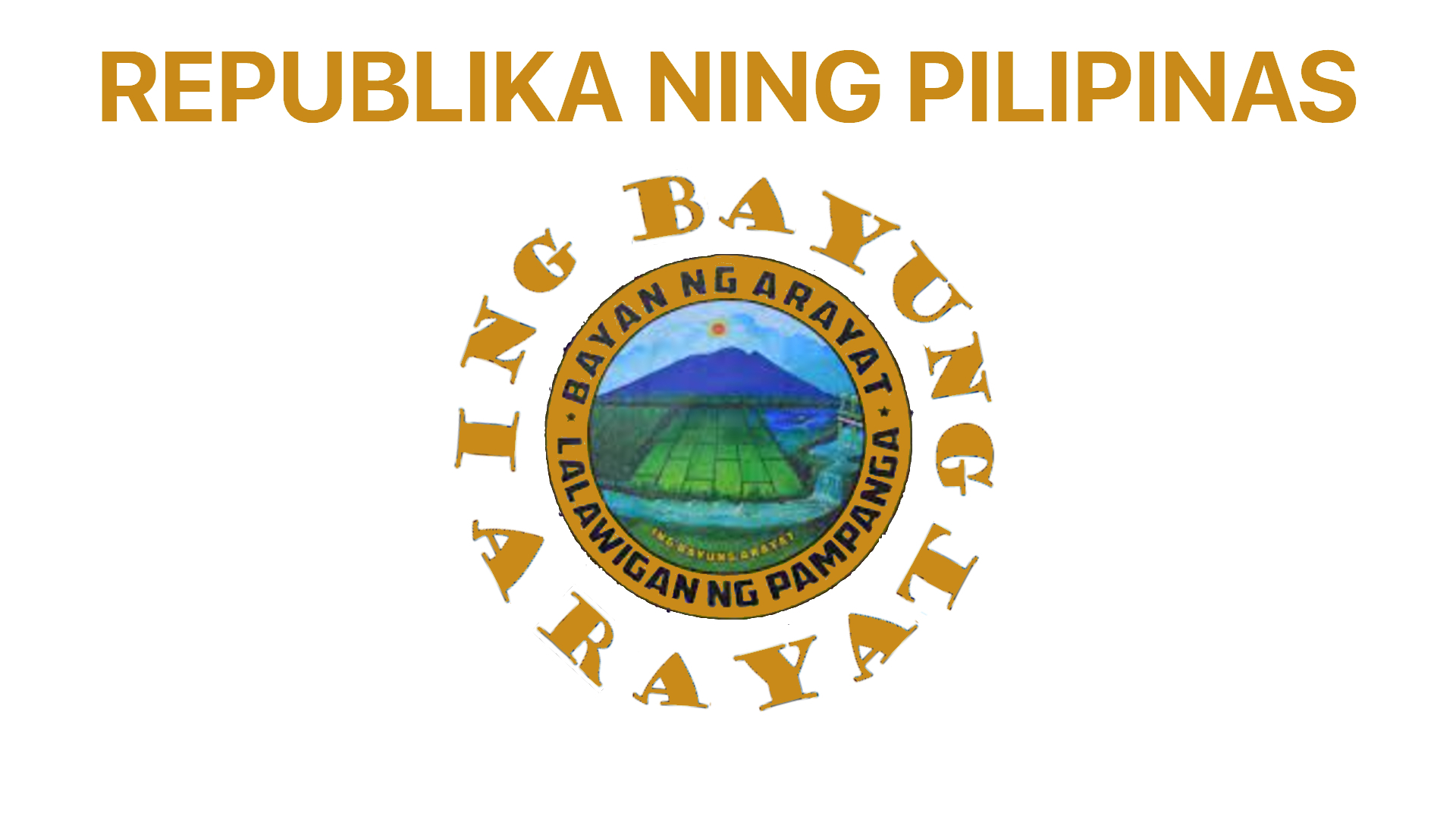
- Flag Seal

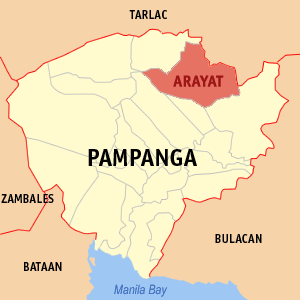
- Map of Pampanga with Arayat highlighted
- Interactive map of Arayat
- Location within the Philippines
- Coordinates: 15°08′57″N 120°46′09″E
- Country: Philippines
- Region: Central Luzon
- Province: Pampanga
- District: 3rd district
- Barangays: 30 (see Barangays)

Government
  - Type: Sangguniang Bayan
  - Mayor: Jeffrey M. Luriz
  - Vice Mayor: Ramon M. Changcoco
  - Representative: Alyssa Michaela M. Gonzales
  - Municipal Council: Members: Rosendo P. Dizon; Nestor E. Changcoco; Elmer P. Hipolito; Ronald M. Alejandrino; Ferdinand G. Kabigting; Edith V. Kabigting; Marx S. Alejandrino; Heraldo G. De Castro Jr.
  - Electorate: 81,178 voters (2025)

Area
  - Total: 134.48 km^{2} (51.92 sq mi)
- Elevation: 55 m (180 ft)
- Highest elevation: 981 m (3,219 ft)
- Lowest elevation: 3 m (9.8 ft)

Population (2024 census)
  - Total: 150,949
  - Density: 1,122.5/km^{2} (2,907.2/sq mi)
  - Households: 32,005

Economy
  - Income class: 1st municipal income class
  - Poverty incidence: 12.44% (2023)
  - Revenue: ₱ 485.4 million (2024)
  - Assets: ₱ 534.7 million (2024)
  - Expenditure: ₱ 485.5 million (2024)
  - Liabilities: ₱ 101.9 million (2024)

Service provider
  - Electricity: Pampanga 1 Electric Cooperative, Inc. (PELCO 1)
- Time zone: UTC+8 (PST)
- ZIP code: 2012
- PSGC: 0305403000
- IDD : area code: +63 (0)45
- Native languages: Kapampangan; Tagalog
- Website: www.arayat.gov.ph

Arayat, officially the Municipality of Arayat (Kapampangan: Balen ning Arayat; Tagalog: Bayan ng Arayat), is a municipality in the province of Pampanga in the Philippines. According to the 2024 census, it has a population of 150,949 people.

== Geography ==
Arayat is bordered with Candaba, Mexico, Magalang, Santa Ana, and Cabiao in Nueva Ecija. A large portion of Mount Arayat is located within this municipality.

Arayat is 22 kilometres (14 mi) from San Fernando, 88 kilometres (55 mi) from Manila, and 7 kilometres (4.3 mi) from Santa Ana.

=== Barangays ===
Arayat is politically subdivided into 30 barangays, as shown below. Each barangay consists of puroks and some have sitios.

- Arenas
- Baliti
- Batasan
- Buensuceso
- Candating
- Gatiawin
- Guemasan
- La Paz (Turu)
- Lacmit
- Lacquios
- Mangga-Cacutud
- Mapalad
- Palinlang
- Paralaya
- Plazang Luma
- Poblacion
- San Agustin Norte
- San Agustin Sur
- San Antonio
- San Jose Mesulo
- San Juan Baño
- San Mateo
- San Nicolas
- San Roque Bitas
- Cupang (Santa Lucia)
- Matamo (Santa Lucia)
- Santo Niño Tabuan
- Suclayin
- Telapayong
- Kaledian (Camba)

=== Climate ===
Climate data for Arayat, Pampanga
Month	Jan	Feb	Mar	Apr	May	Jun	Jul	Aug	Sep	Oct	Nov	Dec	Year
Mean daily maximum °C (°F)	28 (82)	29 (84)	31 (88)	33 (91)	32 (90)	31 (88)	30 (86)	29 (84)	29 (84)	30 (86)	30 (86)	28 (82)	30 (86)
Mean daily minimum °C (°F)	20 (68)	20 (68)	21 (70)	23 (73)	24 (75)	24 (75)	24 (75)	24 (75)	24 (75)	23 (73)	22 (72)	21 (70)	23 (72)
Average precipitation mm (inches)	6 (0.2)	4 (0.2)	6 (0.2)	17 (0.7)	82 (3.2)	122 (4.8)	151 (5.9)	123 (4.8)	124 (4.9)	99 (3.9)	37 (1.5)	21 (0.8)	792 (31.1)
Average rainy days	3.3	2.5	3.6	6.6	17.7	22.2	25.2	23.7	23.2	17.9	9.2	5.2	160.3
Source: Meteoblue (Use with caution: this is modeled/calculated data, not measured locally.)

== Demographics ==
Population census of Arayat

Year	Pop.	±% p.a.
1903	12,904	—
1918	12,302	−0.32%
1939	22,510	+2.92%
1948	22,783	+0.13%
1960	32,976	+3.13%
1970	45,840	+3.34%
1975	52,739	+2.85%
1980	56,742	+1.47%

Year	Pop.	±% p.a.
1990	73,189	+2.58%
1995	85,940	+3.05%
2000	101,792	+3.70%
2007	118,312	+2.10%
2010	121,348	+0.93%
2015	133,492	+1.83%
2020	144,875	+1.74%
2024	150,949	+0.99%

Source: Philippine Statistics Authority

In the 2024 census, the population of Arayat was 150,949 people, with a density of 1,100 inhabitants per square kilometre or 2,800 inhabitants per square mile.

== Economy ==
Poverty incidence of Arayat (%)

Source: Philippine Statistics Authority

== Education ==
There are two school district offices that govern all educational institutions within the municipality. They oversee the management and operations of all private and public, from primary to secondary schools. These are Arayat East Schools District Office, and Arayat West Schools District Office.

=== Primary and elementary schools ===
- Anderson Elementary School
- Arayat Central School
- Arenas Elementary School
- Baliti Elementary School
- Batasan Elementary School
- Bitas Elementary School
- Buensuceso Elementary School
- Cacutud Elementary School
- Calumpang Primary School
- Camba Elementary School
- Candating Elementary School
- Cupang Elementary School
- Gatiawin Elementary School
- Guemasan Elementary School
- JC Glorious Kingdom Academy
- Lacmit Elementary School
- Lacquios Elementary School
- Mapalad Elementary School
- Matamo Elementary School
- Mesulo Elementary School
- Panlinlang Elementary School
- Paroba Primary School
- Plasang Luma Elementary School
- San Agustin Elementary School
- San Antonio Elementary School
- San Juan Bano Elementary School
- San Mateo Elementary School
- San Nicolas Elementary School
- Sta. Cruz Primary School
- Suclayin Elementary School
- Tabuan Elementary School
- Telapayong Elementary School
- Yeshua Ecumenical School

=== Secondary schools ===
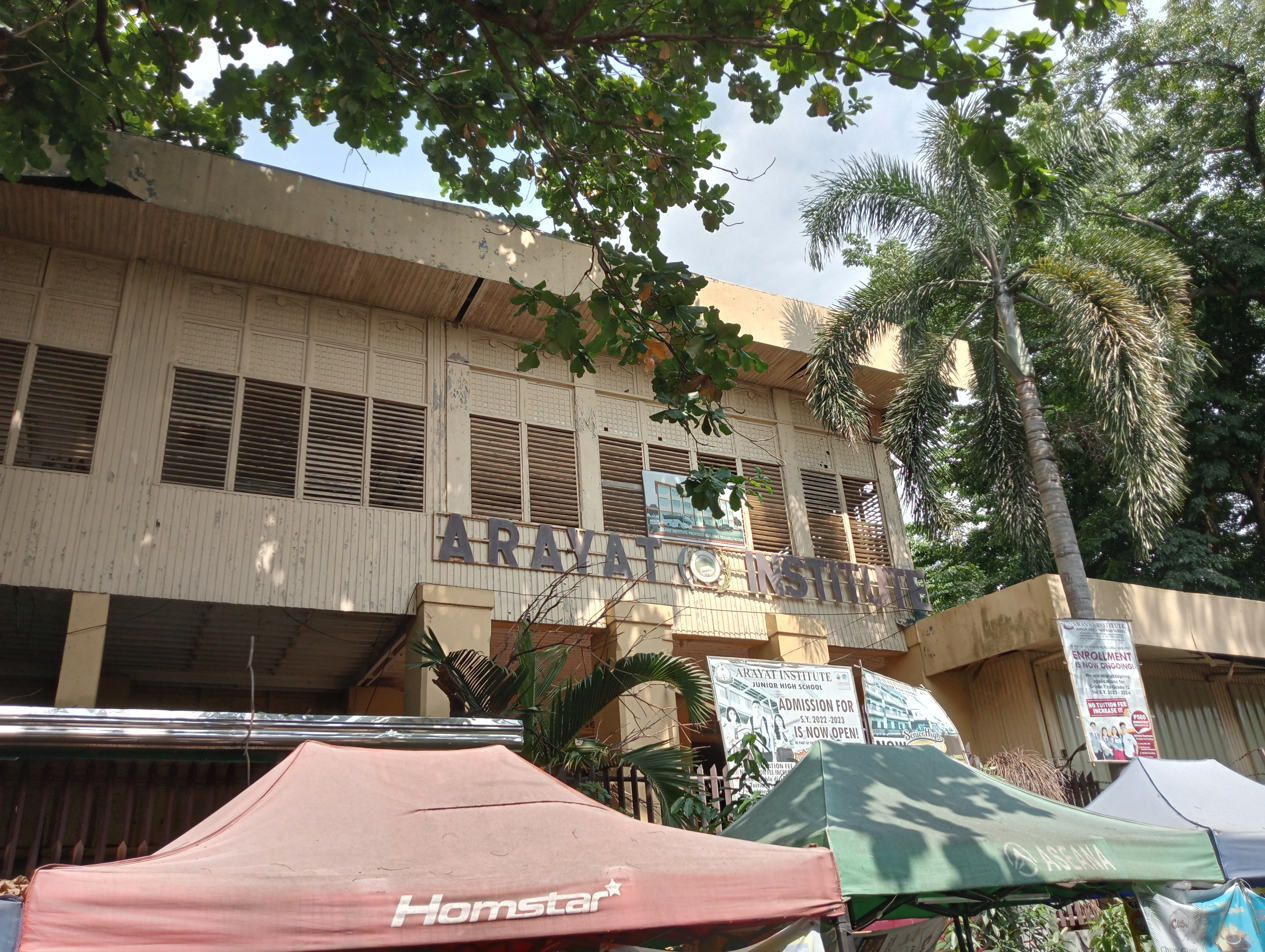
Arayat Institute

- Arayat Institute
- Adelle Grace Montessori School Inc.
- Arayat National High School
- Camba National High School
- Candating National High School
- Gatiawin High School
- Justino Sevilla High School
- San Juan Baño High School
- Arayat Holy Child Educational Foundation Inc.

=== Higher educational institution ===
- Exact Colleges of Asia

== Tourism ==
There are many examples of tourist attractions in Arayat. Some examples include the 100 Steps, Mount Arayat Day hike, and the Palm Cabanas Resort. It receives about 33,000 visitors a year, ranging from relatives that come to visit family, to people that want to explore new cultures. Located in Poblacion, there is also the Santa Catalina de Alejandria church. It has features that have close similarities to the Renaissance.

== History ==
=== Early days ===
Arayat Pampanga began as a small village that was formed way before the Spanish Colonial Era. While there have been many theories about who and where the town officially started, most locals believe that the city was founded by prince Balatagas of the Madjapahit.

During its start, most citizens were farmers. This is how Arayat got most of its tax dollars. Agriculture also still plays an important role in the GDP of Arayat. In 1579, Arayat was considered to be the best Spanish settlements in Pampanga. During the 1600s, Arayat became a fort for Spanish conquest. The first mission was established in 1590 by Fray Juan de Valderama. By the 1850s, however, New Barangays have formed and added up to a total of 11 barangays.

=== Industrial revolution ===
During the 1900s, the amount of Barangays rose from 11 to 23. Jose Alejandrino, Mamerto Natividad helped fend off American colonizers that arrived on December 10, 1942. In the 1930s, however, The former president, Manuel, L. Quezon and Dr Emigido Cruz, decided to make Arayat their second home. They built a farm, chapel, school, hospital, irrigation systems, and homes for the farm helpers. He also brought a group of Japanese experts to teach new farmers.

== Gallery ==
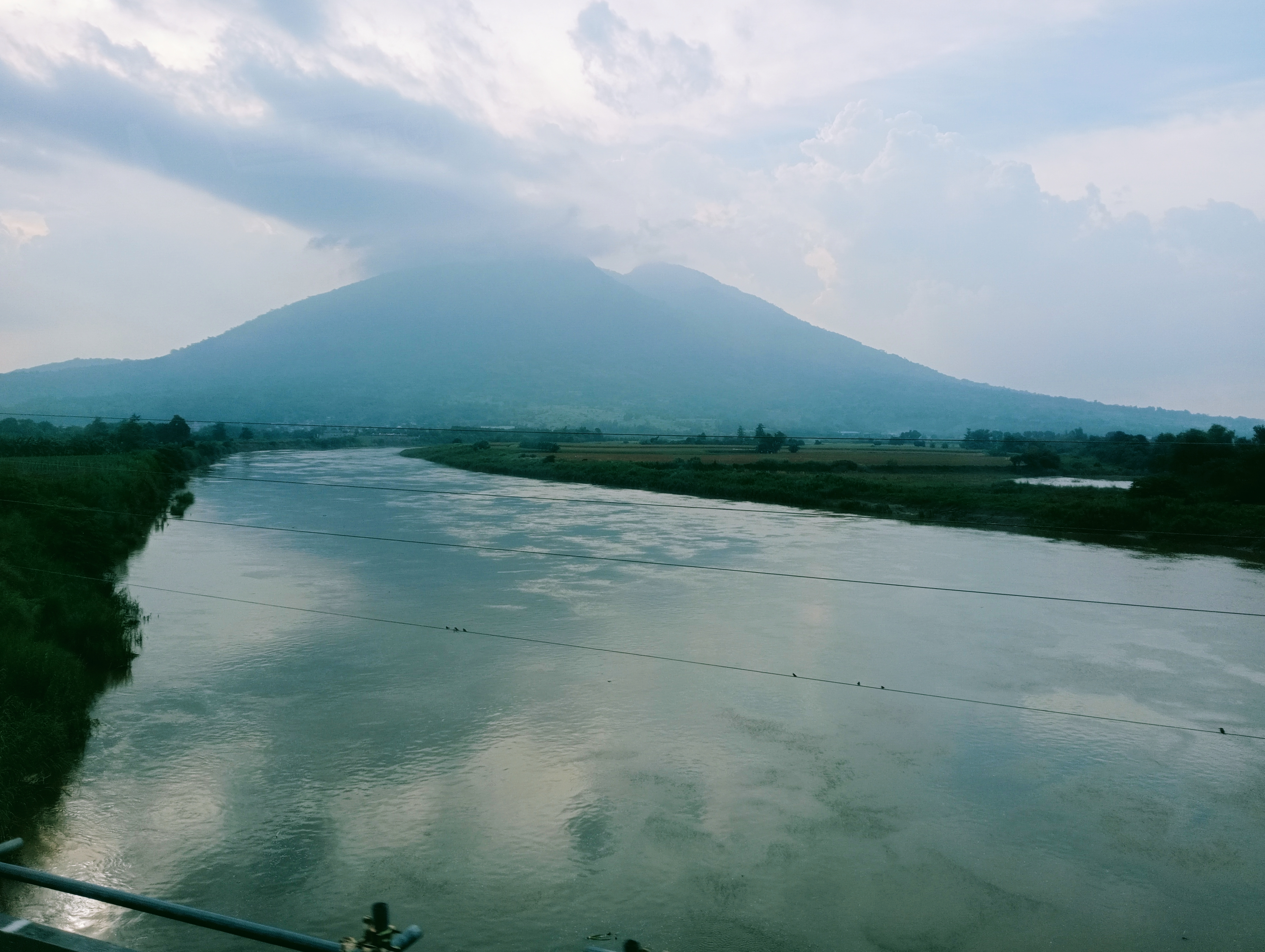
View of Mount Arayat and Pampanga River

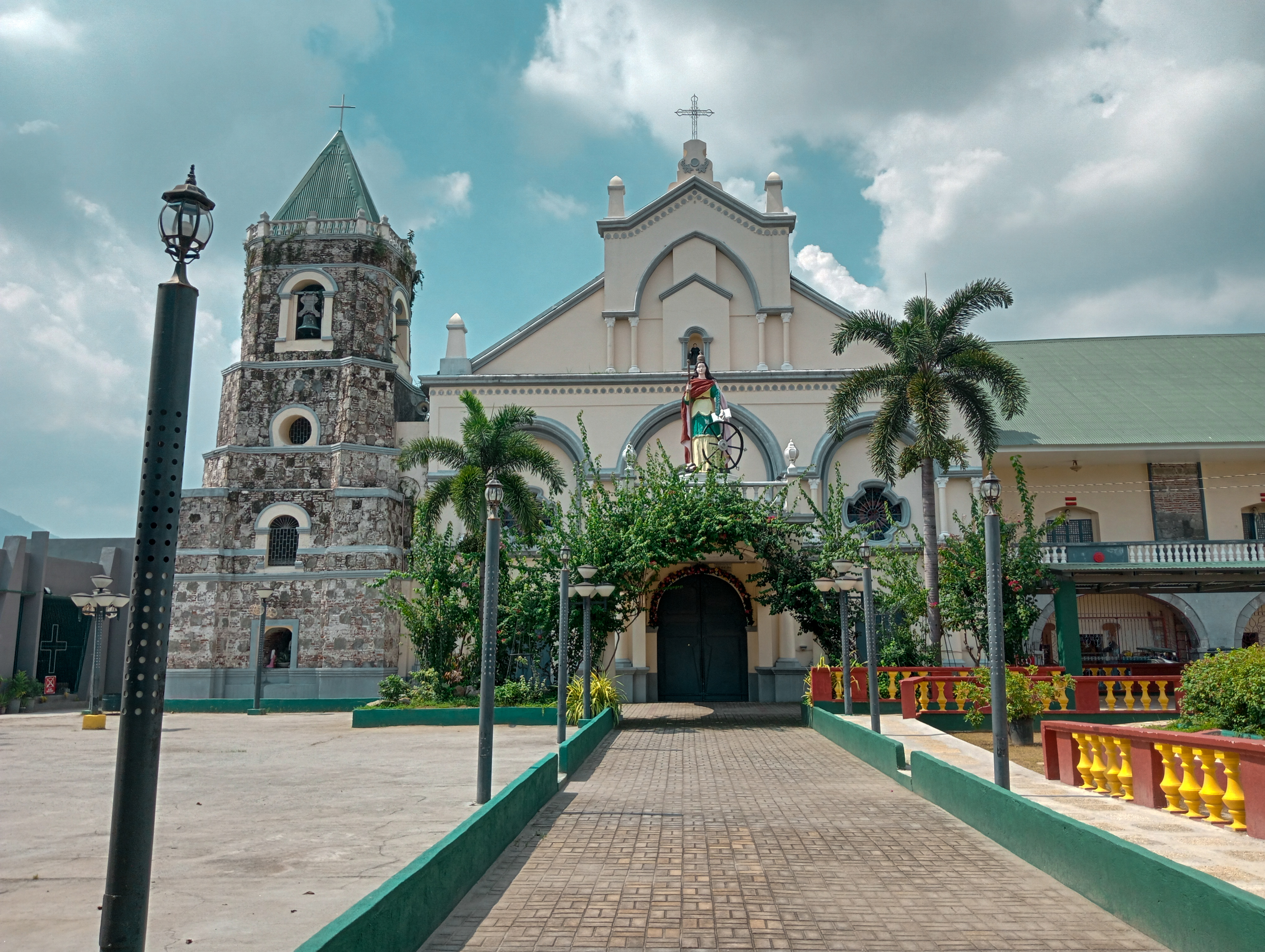
Heritage Santa Catalina Church (built in honor of St Catherine of Alexandria)

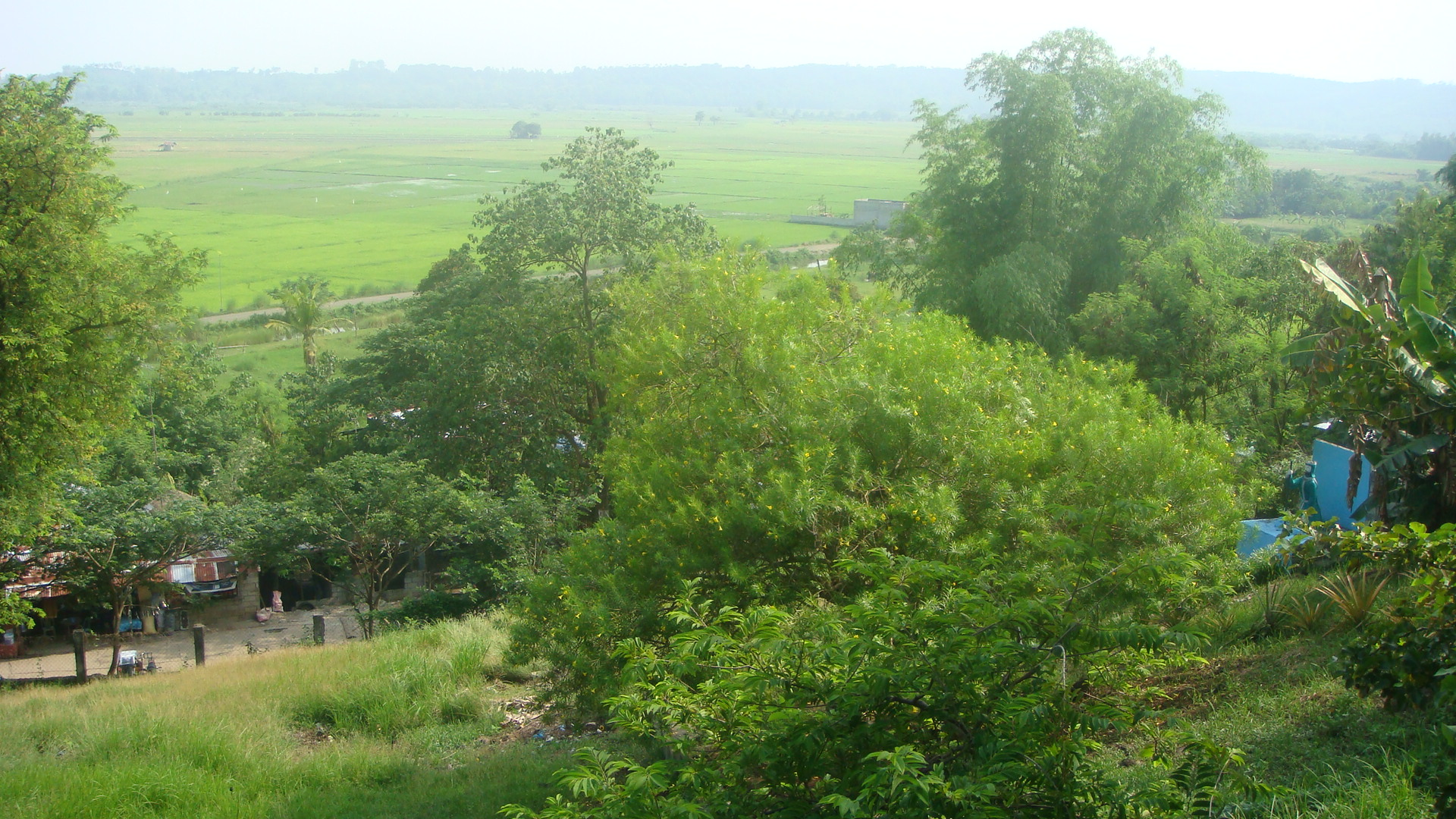
View of San Juan Baño plantations

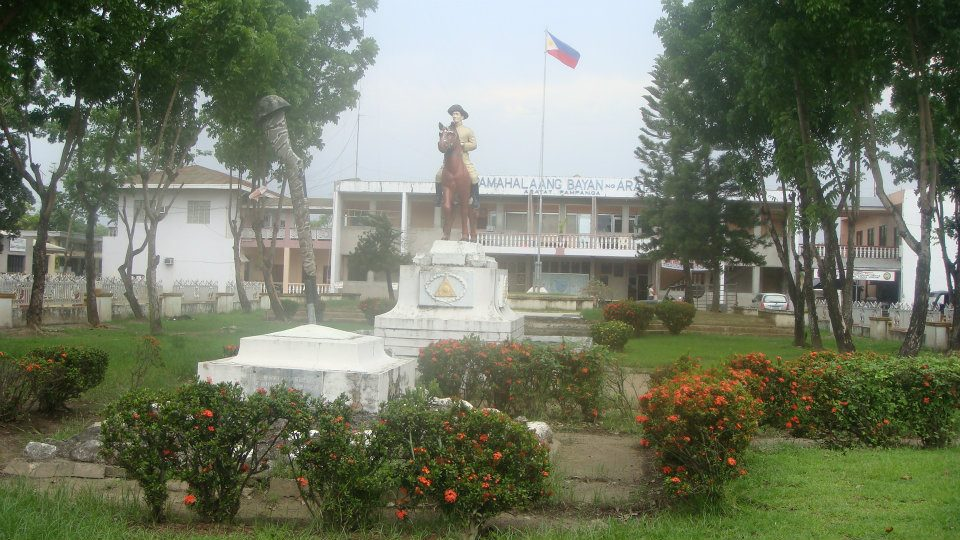
Front of Arayat Municipal Hall

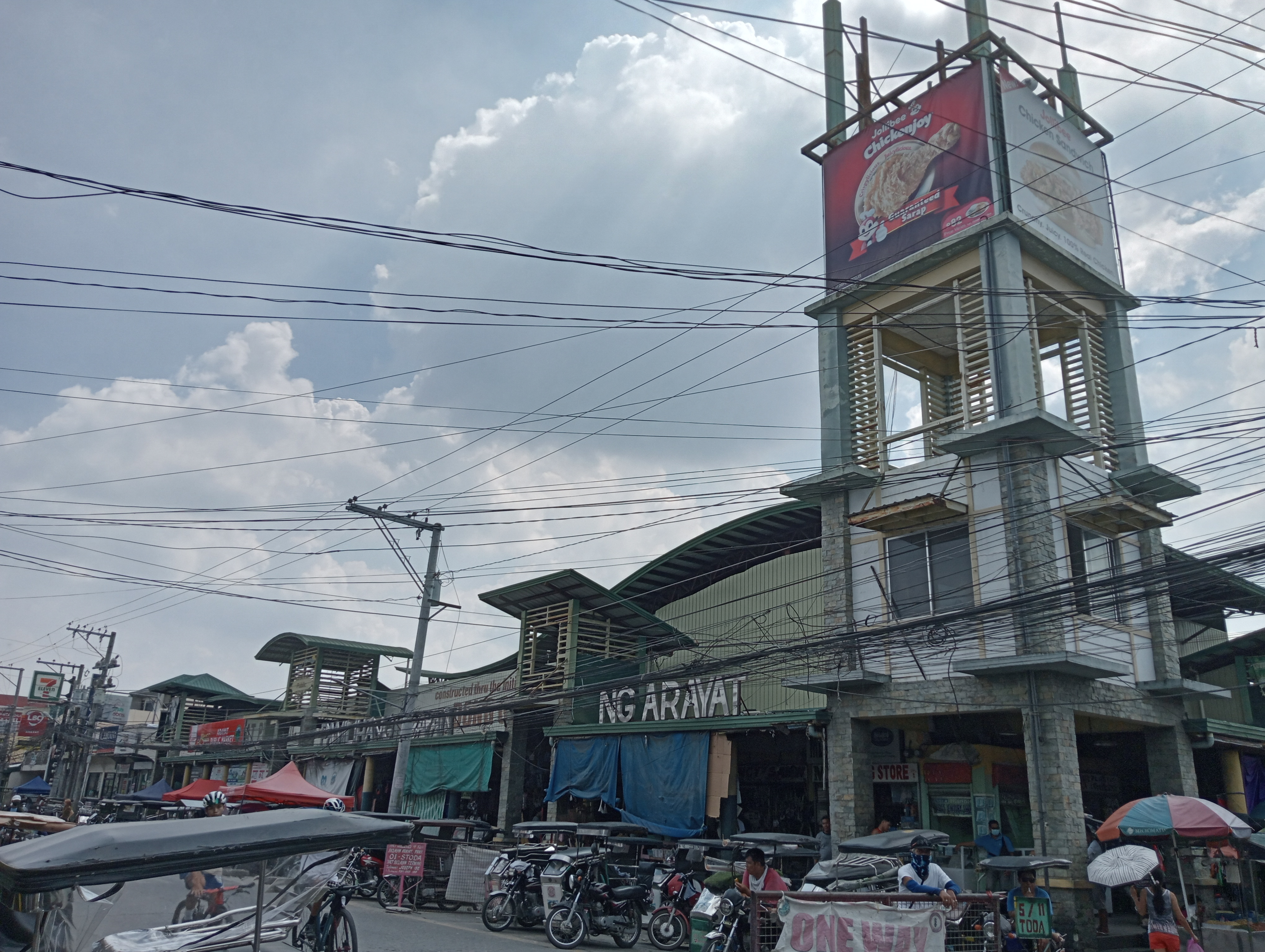
Arayat Public Market

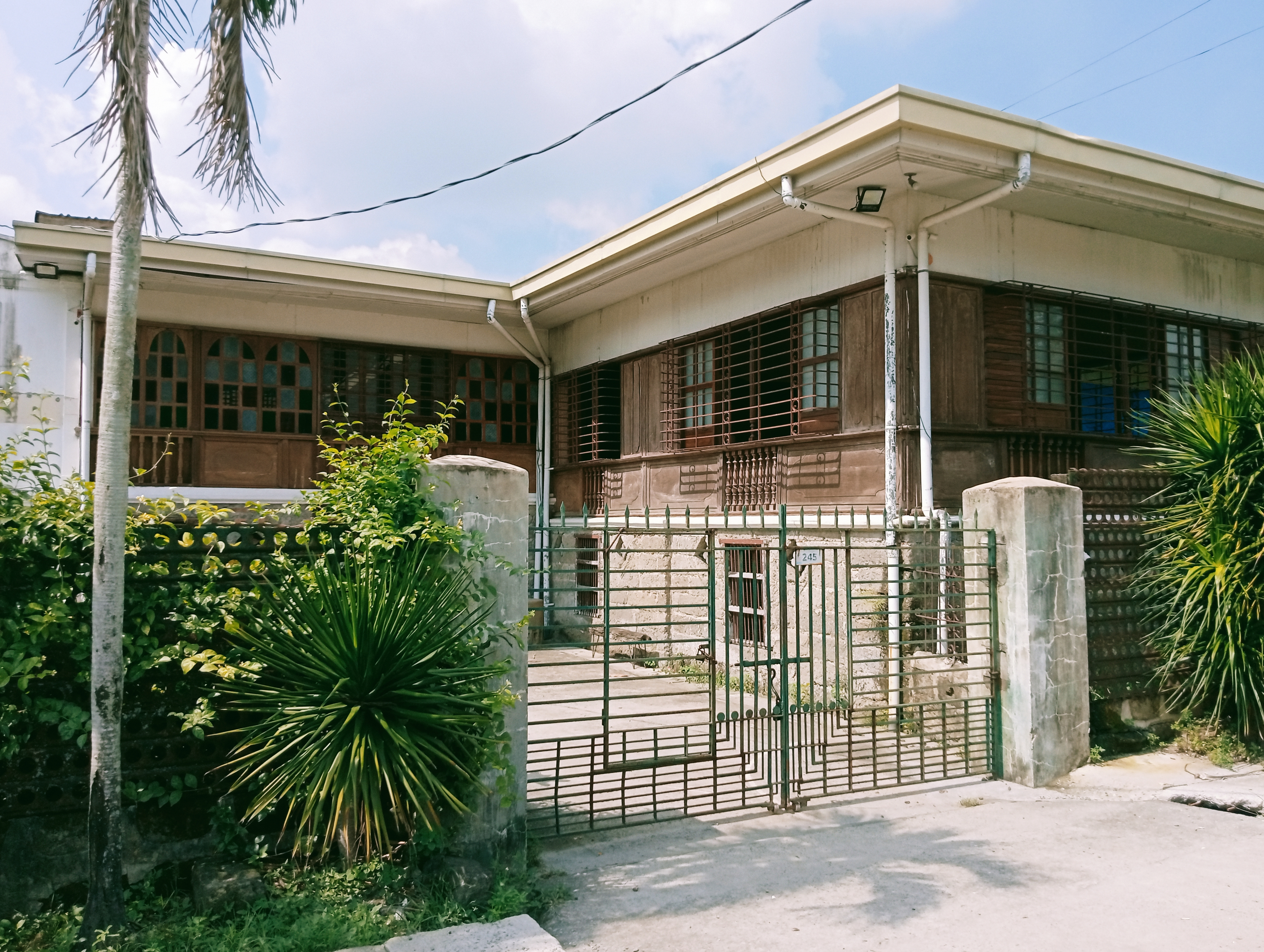
Calo-Medina Ancestral House

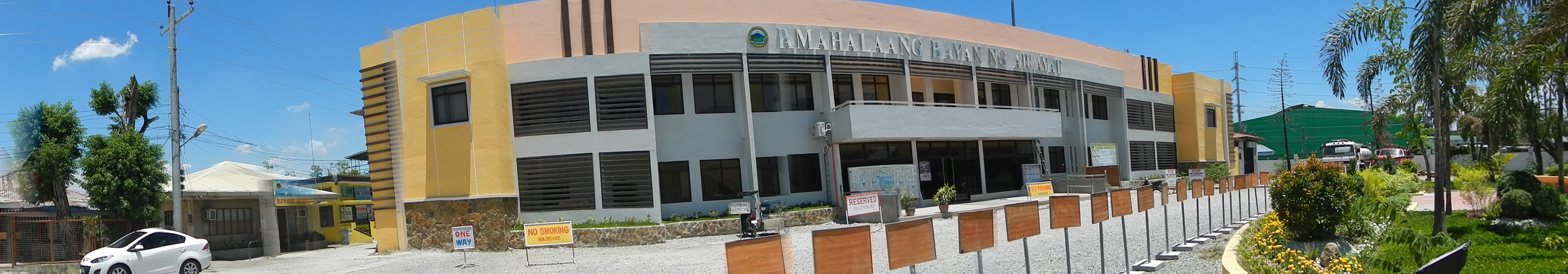
Arayat Municipal Hall
