= 4th Congress of the Philippines =

21st legislative term of the Philippines

←	3rd	5th	→
- Old Legislative Building (c. 1988)

Overview
- Term: January 27, 1958 – December 13, 1961
- President: Carlos P. Garcia
- Vice President: Diosdado Macapagal

Senate
- Members: 24
- President: Eulogio Rodriguez
- President pro tempore: Fernando Lopez
- Majority leader: Cipriano Primicias Sr.
- Minority leader: Ambrosio Padilla (until January 25, 1960); Ferdinand Marcos (from January 25, 1960)

House of Representatives
- Members: 102
- Speaker: Daniel Romualdez
- Speaker pro tempore: Constancio Castañeda
- Majority leader: Jose Aldeguer
- Minority leader: Ferdinand Marcos (until December 30, 1959); Cornelio Villareal (from January 25, 1960)

The 4th Congress of the Philippines (Filipino: Ikaapat na Kongreso ng Pilipinas), composed of the Philippine Senate and House of Representatives, met from January 27, 1958, until December 13, 1961, during the second term of President Carlos P. Garcia.

== Sessions ==
- First Regular Session: January 27 – May 22, 1958
- First Special Session: May 26 – June 7, 1958
- Second Regular Session: January 26 – May 21, 1959
- Second Special Session: June 1 – July 4, 1959
- Third Regular Session: January 25 – May 19, 1960
- Third Special Session: June 14 – July 18, 1960
- Fourth Regular Session: January 23 – May 18, 1961
- Informal Meeting: July 15, 1961
- Joint Session: December 12–13, 1961

== Legislation ==
The Fourth Congress passed a total of 1,401 laws. (Republic Act Nos. 2050 – 3450)

== Leadership ==
=== Senate ===
Senate President

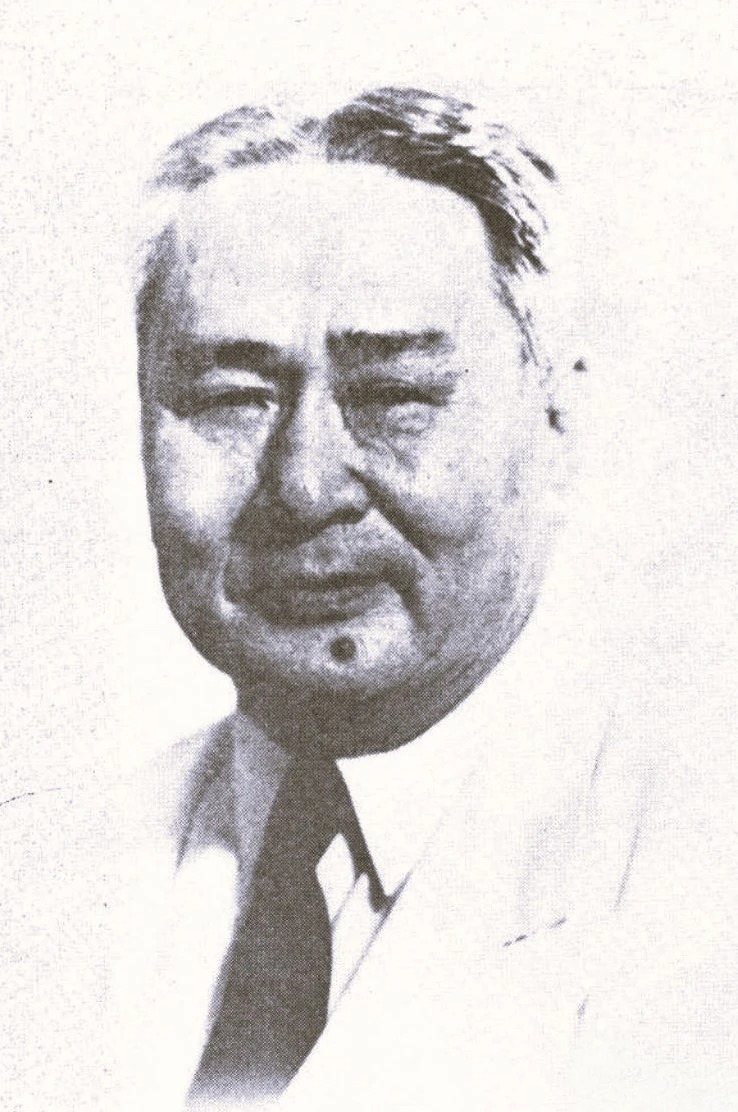
Eulogio Rodriguez

- President: Eulogio Rodriguez (Nacionalista)
- President pro tempore: Fernando Lopez (Nacionalista)
- Majority Floor Leader: Cipriano Primicias Sr. (Nacionalista)
- Minority Floor Leader:
  - Ambrosio Padilla (Liberal), until January 25, 1960
  - Ferdinand Marcos (Liberal), from January 25, 1960

=== House of Representatives ===
House Speaker

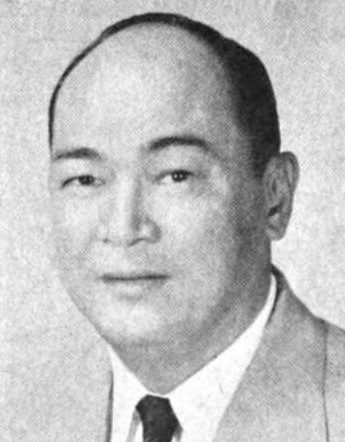
Daniel Romualdez

- Speaker: Daniel Romualdez (Leyte–4th, Nacionalista)
- Speaker pro tempore: Constancio Castañeda (Tarlac–2nd, Nacionalista)
- Majority Floor Leader: Jose Aldeguer (Iloilo–5th, Nacionalista)
- Minority Floor Leader:
  - Ferdinand Marcos (Ilocos Norte–2nd, Liberal), until December 30, 1959
  - Cornelio Villareal (Capiz–2nd, Liberal), from January 25, 1960

== Members ==
=== Senate ===
Composition of the Senate during the 4th Congress' 1st and 2nd (left), and 3rd & 4th (right) sessions.

The following are the terms of the senators of this Congress, according to the date of election:

- For senators elected on November 10, 1953: December 30, 1953 – December 30, 1959
- For senators elected on November 8, 1955: December 30, 1955 – December 30, 1961
- For senators elected on November 12, 1957: December 30, 1957 – December 30, 1963
- For senators elected on November 10, 1959: December 30, 1959 – December 30, 1965

Senator	Party	Term end
Alejandro Almendras	Nacionalista	1965
Domocao Alonto	Nacionalista	1961
Eulogio Balao	Nacionalista	1963
Edmundo B. Cea	Nacionalista	1959
Mariano Jesus Cuenco	Nacionalista	1959, 1965
Rogelio de la Rosa	Liberal	1963
Estanislao Fernandez	Liberal	1965
Ruperto Kangleon (Note: Ruperto Kangleon died on February 27, 1958.)	Democratic	1959
Oscar Ledesma	Nacionalista	1963
Roseller T. Lim	Nacionalista	1963
Fernando Lopez	Nacionalista (Note: Affiliated with the Democratic Party until 1959.)	1959, 1965
Alejo Mabanag	Nacionalista	1959
Pacita Madrigal-Warns	Nacionalista	1961
Genaro Magsaysay	Nacionalista	1965
Ferdinand Marcos	Liberal	1965
Ambrosio Padilla	Liberal	1963
Quintin Paredes	Nacionalista	1961
Emmanuel Pelaez	Nacionalista	1959
Cipriano Primicias Sr.	Nacionalista	1963
Gil Puyat	Nacionalista	1963
Claro M. Recto (Note: Claro M. Recto died on October 2, 1960.)	NCP	1961
Soc Rodrigo	Nacionalista	1961
Eulogio Rodriguez	Nacionalista	1959, 1965
Decoroso Rosales	Nacionalista	1961
Pedro Sabido	Nacionalista	1961
Lorenzo Sumulong	Nacionalista	1961
Lorenzo Tañada	NCP	1959, 1965
Arturo Tolentino	Nacionalista	1963

=== House of Representatives ===
Composition of the House of Representatives during the 4th Congress.

Fourth Congress representation map of the Philippines

Province/City	District	Representative	Party
Abra	Lone	Lucas P. Paredes	Nacionalista
Agusan	Lone	Guillermo Sanchez	Nacionalista
Aklan	Lone	Jose Legaspi	Nacionalista
Albay	1st	Tecla San Andres Ziga	Liberal
Albay	2nd	Justino Nuyda	Nacionalista
Albay	3rd	Pio Duran	Nacionalista
Antique	Lone	Tobias Fornier	Nacionalista
Bataan	Lone	Jose Nuguid	Nacionalista
Batanes	Lone	Manuel Agudo	Nacionalista
Batangas	1st	Apolinario Apacible	Nacionalista
Batangas	2nd	Numeriano Babao	Nacionalista
Batangas	3rd	Jose Laurel IV	Nacionalista
Bohol	1st	Natalio Castillo (Note: Natalio Castillo was appointed as Executive Secretary on January 25, 1960.)	Nacionalista
Bohol	2nd	Bartolome Cabangbang	Nacionalista
Bohol	3rd	Maximino Garcia	Nacionalista
Bukidnon	Lone	Cesar Fortich (Note: Cesar Fortich was appointed as Secretary of Agriculture and Natural Resources on March 3, 1960. He subsequently returned to the seat following his resignation from the post on September 15, 1961.)	Nacionalista
Bulacan	1st	Jose Suntay	Liberal
Bulacan	2nd	Rogaciano Mercado	Nacionalista
Cagayan	1st	Felipe Garduque Jr. (Note: Felipe Garduque Jr. was elected as Governor of Cagayan on November 10, 1959.)	Nacionalista
Cagayan	2nd	Benjamin Ligot	Nacionalista
Camarines Norte	Lone	Pedro Venida	Young Philippines
Camarines Sur	1st	Agaton Ursua	Nacionalista
Camarines Sur	2nd	Felix Fuentebella	Nacionalista
Capiz	1st	Gerry Roxas	Liberal
Capiz	2nd	Cornelio Villareal	Liberal
Catanduanes	Lone	Jose M. Alberto	Liberal
Cavite	Lone	Justiniano Montano	Nacionalista
Cebu	1st	Ramon Durano Sr.	Nacionalista
Cebu	2nd	Sergio Osmeña Jr.	Nacionalista
Cebu	3rd	Maximino Noel	Nacionalista
Cebu	4th	Isidro Kintanar	Nacionalista
Cebu	5th	Miguel Cuenco	Nacionalista
Cebu	6th	Manuel Zosa	Nacionalista
Cebu	7th	Antonio de Pio	Nacionalista
Cotabato	Lone	Salipada Pendatun	Nacionalista
Davao	Lone	Gavino Sepulveda	Liberal
Ilocos Norte	1st	Antonio Raquiza	Liberal
Ilocos Norte	2nd	Ferdinand Marcos (Note: Ferdinand Marcos took office as Senator of the Philippines on December 30, 1959.)	Liberal
Ilocos Sur	1st	Faustino Tobia	Nacionalista
Ilocos Sur	2nd	Godofredo Reyes (Note: Godofredo Reyes was elected as Governor of Ilocos Sur on November 10, 1959.)	Nacionalista
Iloilo	1st	Pedro G. Trono	Nacionalista
Iloilo	2nd	Pascual Espinosa	Liberal
Iloilo	3rd	Domitilo Abordo	Nacionalista
Iloilo	4th	Ricardo Ladrido	Nacionalista
Iloilo	5th	Jose Aldeguer	Nacionalista
Isabela	Lone	Delfin Albano	Nacionalista
La Union	1st	Francisco Ortega	Nacionalista
La Union	2nd	Manuel Cases	Liberal
Laguna	1st	Jacobo Gonzales	Nacionalista
Laguna	2nd	Wenceslao Lagumbay	Nacionalista
Lanao	Lone	Laurentino Badelles	Nacionalista
Leyte	1st	Marcelino Veloso	Nacionalista
Leyte	2nd	Dominador Tan	Nacionalista
Leyte	3rd	Nicanor Yñiguez	Nacionalista
Leyte	4th	Daniel Romualdez	Nacionalista
Leyte	5th	Alberto Aguja	Nacionalista
Manila	1st	Salvador Mariño	Liberal
Manila	2nd	Joaquin R. Roces	Nacionalista
Manila	3rd	Ramon Bagatsing	Liberal
Manila	4th	Augusto Francisco	Nacionalista
Marinduque	Lone	Francisco Lecaroz	Nacionalista
Masbate	Lone	Emilio Espinosa Jr.	Nacionalista
Misamis Occidental	Lone	William Chiongbian	Liberal
Misamis Oriental	Lone	Fausto Dugenio	Nationalist Citizens
Mountain Province	1st	Juan Duyan	Liberal
Mountain Province	2nd	Ramon P. Mitra	Nacionalista
Mountain Province	3rd	Luis Hora	Nacionalista
Negros Occidental	1st	Vicente Gustilo Sr.	Nacionalista
Negros Occidental	2nd	Inocencio Ferrer	Nacionalista
Negros Occidental	3rd	Agustin Gatuslao	Nacionalista
Negros Oriental	1st	Lorenzo Teves	Nacionalista
Negros Oriental	2nd	Lamberto Macias	Nacionalista
Nueva Ecija	1st	Eugenio Baltao	Liberal
Nueva Ecija	2nd	Celestino Juan	Nacionalista
Nueva Vizcaya	Lone	Leonardo B. Perez	Nacionalista
Occidental Mindoro	Lone	Felipe Abeleda	Liberal
Oriental Mindoro	Lone	Conrado Morente	Democratic
Palawan	Lone	Gaudencio Abordo	Nacionalista
Pampanga	1st	Francisco Nepomuceno (Note: Francisco Nepomuceno was elected as Governor of Pampanga on November 10, 1959.)	Liberal
Pampanga	2nd	Emilio Cortez	Nacionalista
Pangasinan	1st	Aguedo Agbayani	Nacionalista
Pangasinan	2nd	Angel Fernandez	Liberal
Pangasinan	3rd	Cipriano Primicias Jr. (Note: Cipriano Primicias Jr. was removed by the House of Representatives Electoral Tribunal on June 24, 1960, after an electoral protest.)	Nacionalista
Pangasinan	3rd	Jose Parayno (Note: Jose Parayno replaced Cipriano Primicias Jr. on June 24, 1960, after winning an electoral protest.)	Liberal
Pangasinan	4th	Amadeo J. Perez	Liberal
Pangasinan	5th	Luciano Millan	Nacionalista
Quezon	1st	Manuel S. Enverga	Nacionalista
Quezon	2nd	Leon Guinto Jr.	Nacionalista
Rizal	1st	Benedicto Padilla	Liberal
Rizal	2nd	Francisco Sumulong	Nacionalista
Romblon	Lone	Jose D. Moreno	Nacionalista
Samar	1st	Eladio Balite	Nacionalista
Samar	2nd	Valeriano Yancha	Nacionalista
Samar	3rd	Felipe Abrigo	Nacionalista
Sorsogon	1st	Salvador Encinas	Nacionalista
Sorsogon	2nd	Vicente Peralta	Nacionalista
Sulu	Lone	Ombra Amilbangsa	Liberal
Surigao	Lone	Reynaldo Honrado	Nacionalista
Tarlac	1st	Jose Roy	Nacionalista
Tarlac	2nd	Constancio Castañeda	Nacionalista
Zambales	Lone	Genaro Magsaysay (Note: Genaro Magsaysay took office as Senator of the Philippines on December 30, 1959.)	Nacionalista
Zamboanga del Norte	Lone	Alberto Ubay	Nacionalista
Zamboanga del Sur	Lone	Canuto Enerio	Nacionalista

== See also ==
- Congress of the Philippines
- Senate of the Philippines
- House of Representatives of the Philippines
- 1957 Philippine general election
- 1959 Philippine general election
