= 2013 Philippine House of Representatives elections in the Ilocos Region =

Elections were held in the Ilocos Region for seats in the House of Representatives of the Philippines on May 13, 2013.

The candidate with the most votes won that district's seat for the 16th Congress of the Philippines.

== Summary ==
Party	Popular vote	%	Swing	Seats won	Change
NPC				6	
Liberal				2	
Nacionalista				2	
Lakas				1	
KBL				1	
Aksyon				0	
NUP				0	
Independent				0	
Valid votes				12	
Invalid votes					
Turnout					
Registered voters					

== Ilocos Norte ==
=== 1st District ===
Incumbent Rodolfo Fariñas is running unopposed.

2013 Philippine House of Representatives election at Ilocos Norte's 1st district
Party	Candidate	Votes	%
Nacionalista	Rodolfo Fariñas	102,066	68.96
Invalid or blank votes		45,935	31.04
Total votes		148,001	100.00
Nacionalista hold			

=== 2nd District ===
Imelda Marcos is the incumbent.

2013 Philippine House of Representatives election at Ilocos Norte's 2nd district
Party	Candidate	Votes	%
KBL	Imelda Marcos	94,484	76.13
Independent	Ferdinand Ignacio	11,221	9.04
Independent	Lorenzo Madamba	1,647	1.33
Margin of victory		83,263	67.09%
Invalid or blank votes		16,755	13.50
Total votes		124,107	100.00
KBL hold			

== Ilocos Sur ==
=== 1st District ===
Incumbent Ryan Singson is not running; instead, he is for the governorship of Ilocos Sur. His brother, former Representative Ronald Singson who had resigned in 2011 due to a personal scandal, is his party's nominee.

2013 Philippine House of Representatives election at Ilocos Sur's 1st district
Party	Candidate	Votes	%
Nacionalista	Ronald Singson	64,373	58.52
Liberal	Trandy Baterina	31,978	28.85
Margin of victory		32,935	29.22%
Invalid or blank votes		14,502	13.08
Total votes		110,853	100.00
Nacionalista hold			

=== 2nd District ===
Eric Singson is the incumbent.

2013 Philippine House of Representatives election at Ilocos Sur's 2nd district
Party	Candidate	Votes	%
Liberal	Eric Singson	113,667	70.13
Aksyon	Henry Capela	20,264	12.50
Margin of victory		93,403	57.63%
Invalid or blank votes		28,149	17.37
Total votes		162,080	100.00
Liberal hold			

== La Union ==
=== 1st District ===
Victor Francisco Ortega is the incumbent.

2013 Philippine House of Representatives election at La Union's 1st district
Party	Candidate	Votes	%
Lakas	Victor Francisco Ortega	117,053	87.49
Independent	Ruella Tiongson	3,380	2.53
Margin of victory		113,673	84.97%
Invalid or blank votes		13,351	9.99
Total votes		133,784	100.00
Lakas hold			

=== 2nd District ===
Eufranio Eriguel is the incumbent.

2013 Philippine House of Representatives election at La Union's 2nd district
Party	Candidate	Votes	%
NPC	Eufranio Eriguel	145,322	79.20
NUP	Thomas Dumpit	27,037	14.74
Margin of victory		118,285	64.47%
Invalid or blank votes		11,117	6.06
Total votes		183,476	100.00
NPC hold			

== Pangasinan ==
=== 1st District ===
Jesus Celeste is the incumbent.

2013 Philippine House of Representatives election at Pangasinan's 1st district
Party	Candidate	Votes	%
NPC	Jesus Celeste	109,914	57.51
Liberal	Leonildo Pulido	54,949	28.76
Margin of victory		54,965	28.75%
Invalid or blank votes		26,242	14.15
Total votes		191,105	100.00
NPC hold			

=== 2nd District ===
Leopoldo Bataoil is the incumbent.

2013 Philippine House of Representatives special election at Pangasinan's 2nd district
Party	Candidate	Votes	%
NPC	Leopoldo Bataoil	154,466	67.21
Liberal	Kim Lokin	53,394	23.23
Margin of victory		101,072	43.98%
Invalid or blank votes		21,985	9.56
Total votes		229,825	100.00
NPC hold			

=== 3rd District ===
Incumbent Maria Rachel Arenas was running unopposed but backed out; her mother, Rose Marie Arenas is her substitute.

2013 Philippine House of Representatives special election at Pangasinan's 3rd district
Party	Candidate	Votes	%
Liberal	Rose Marie Arenas	201,340	73.96
Invalid or blank votes		70,856	26.04
Total votes		272,196	100.00
Liberal hold			

=== 4th District ===
Gina de Venecia is the incumbent.

2013 Philippine House of Representatives special election at Pangasinan's 4th district
Party	Candidate	Votes	%
NPC	Gina de Venecia	157,784	79.04
Nacionalista	Celia Lim	27,184	13.62
Margin of victory		130,600	65.43%
Invalid or blank votes		14,648	7.34
Total votes		199,616	100.00
NPC hold			

=== 5th District ===
Carmen Cojuangco is the incumbent.

2013 Philippine House of Representatives special election at Pangasinan's 5th district
Party	Candidate	Votes	%
NPC	Carmen Cojuangco	164,504	75.67
Independent	Demetria Demetrio	15,466	7.11
Margin of victory		149,038	68.56
Invalid or blank votes		37,412	17.22
Total votes		217,382	100.00
NPC hold			

=== 6th District ===
Incumbent Marlyn Primicias-Agabas is running unopposed after her sole opponent, Brigido Gallano (independent), withdrew.

2013 Philippine House of Representatives election at Pangasinan's 6th district
Party	Candidate	Votes	%
NPC	Marlyn Primicias-Agabas	161,362	76.00
Invalid or blank votes		50,937	24
Total votes		212,299	100.00
NPC hold			
