= Santa Barbara, Pangasinan =

Municipality in Pangasinan, Philippines

Santa Barbara
- Municipality
- Municipality of Santa Barbara
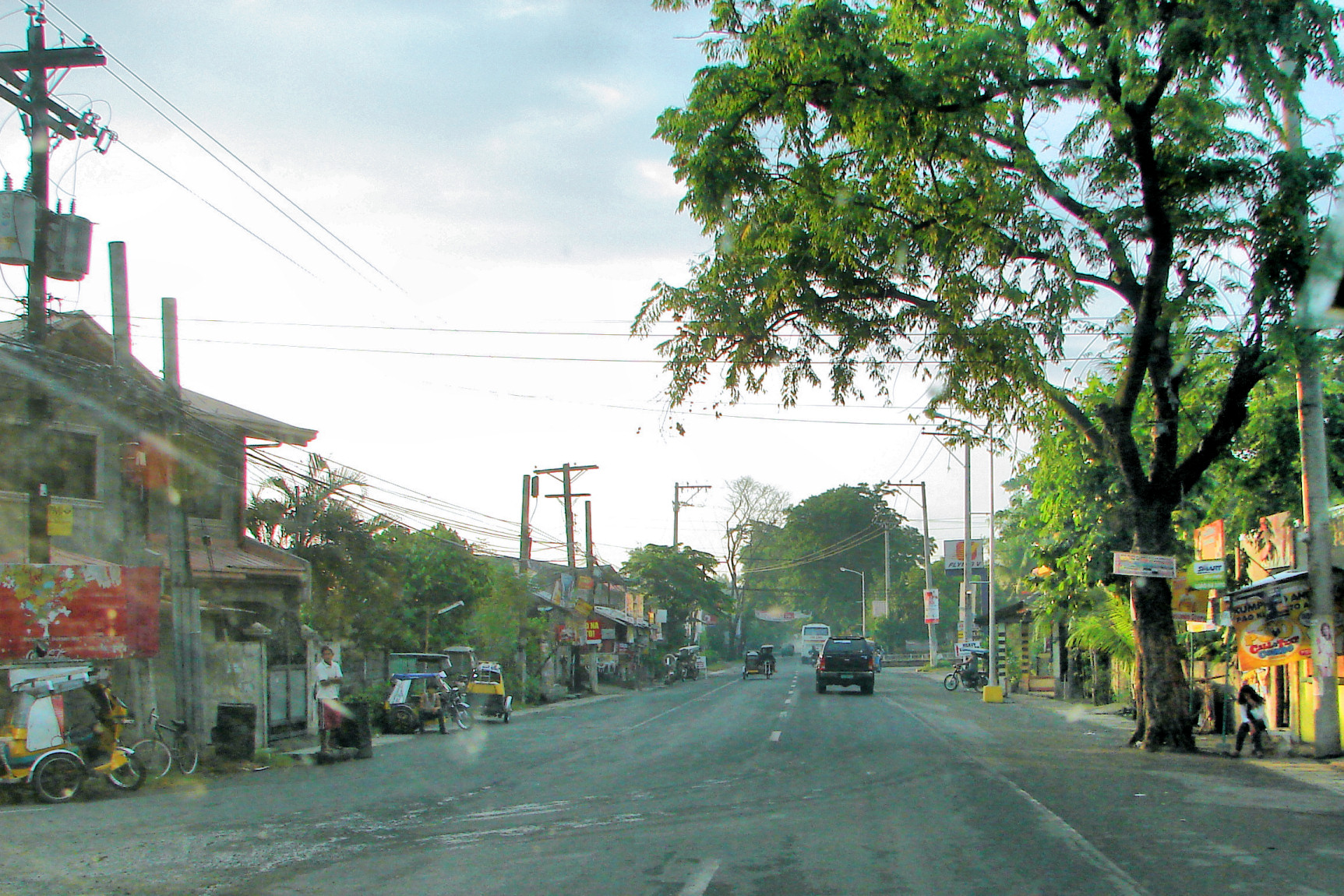
- Street in Sta. Barbara

- Seal

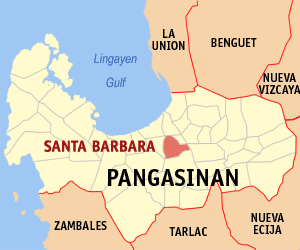
- Map of Pangasinan with Santa Barbara highlighted
- Interactive map of Santa Barbara
- Location within the Philippines
- Coordinates: 16°00′11″N 120°24′03″E
- Country: Philippines
- Region: Ilocos Region
- Province: Pangasinan
- District: 3rd district
- Founded: October 30, 1741
- Annexation to Calasiao: October 8, 1903
- Chartered: October 31, 1906
- Named for: Saint Barbara
- Barangays: 29 (see Barangays)

Government
  - Type: Sangguniang Bayan
  - Mayor: Carlito S. Zaplan
  - Vice Mayor: Rogelio Quibrantos Navarro
  - Representative: Maria Rachel J. Arenas
  - Municipal Council: Members: Jhustyn jimar advincula; Mark Cruz; Carlito D. Zaplan, Jr.; Bobby G. Barbiran; Phyll Anthony Zaplan; Ramil Delos Santos; Bernardine Barbiran; Roderick B. Torio
  - Electorate: 57,629 voters (2025)

Area
  - Total: 61.37 km^{2} (23.70 sq mi)
- Elevation: 9.0 m (29.5 ft)
- Highest elevation: 38 m (125 ft)
- Lowest elevation: 1 m (3.3 ft)

Population (2024 census)
  - Total: 92,420
  - Density: 1,506/km^{2} (3,900/sq mi)
  - Households: 21,809
- Demonym: Santa Barbaran

Economy
  - Income class: 1st municipal income class
  - Poverty incidence: 12.67% (2023)
  - Revenue: ₱ 432.6 million (2024)
  - Assets: ₱ 1,379 million (2024)
  - Expenditure: ₱ 362.3 million (2024)
  - Liabilities: ₱ 250.5 million (2024)

Service provider
  - Electricity: Pangasinan 3 Electric Cooperative (PANELCO 3)
- Time zone: UTC+8 (PST)
- ZIP code: 2419
- PSGC: 0105538000
- IDD : area code: +63 (0)75
- Native languages: Pangasinan; Ilocano; Tagalog
- Website: www.stabarbara-pangasinan.ph

Santa Barbara, officially the Municipality of Santa Barbara (Pangasinan: Baley na Santa Barbara; Ilocano: Ili ti Santa Barbara; Tagalog: Bayan ng Santa Barbara), is a municipality in the province of Pangasinan, Philippines. According to the 2024 census, it has a population of 92,420 people.

== History ==
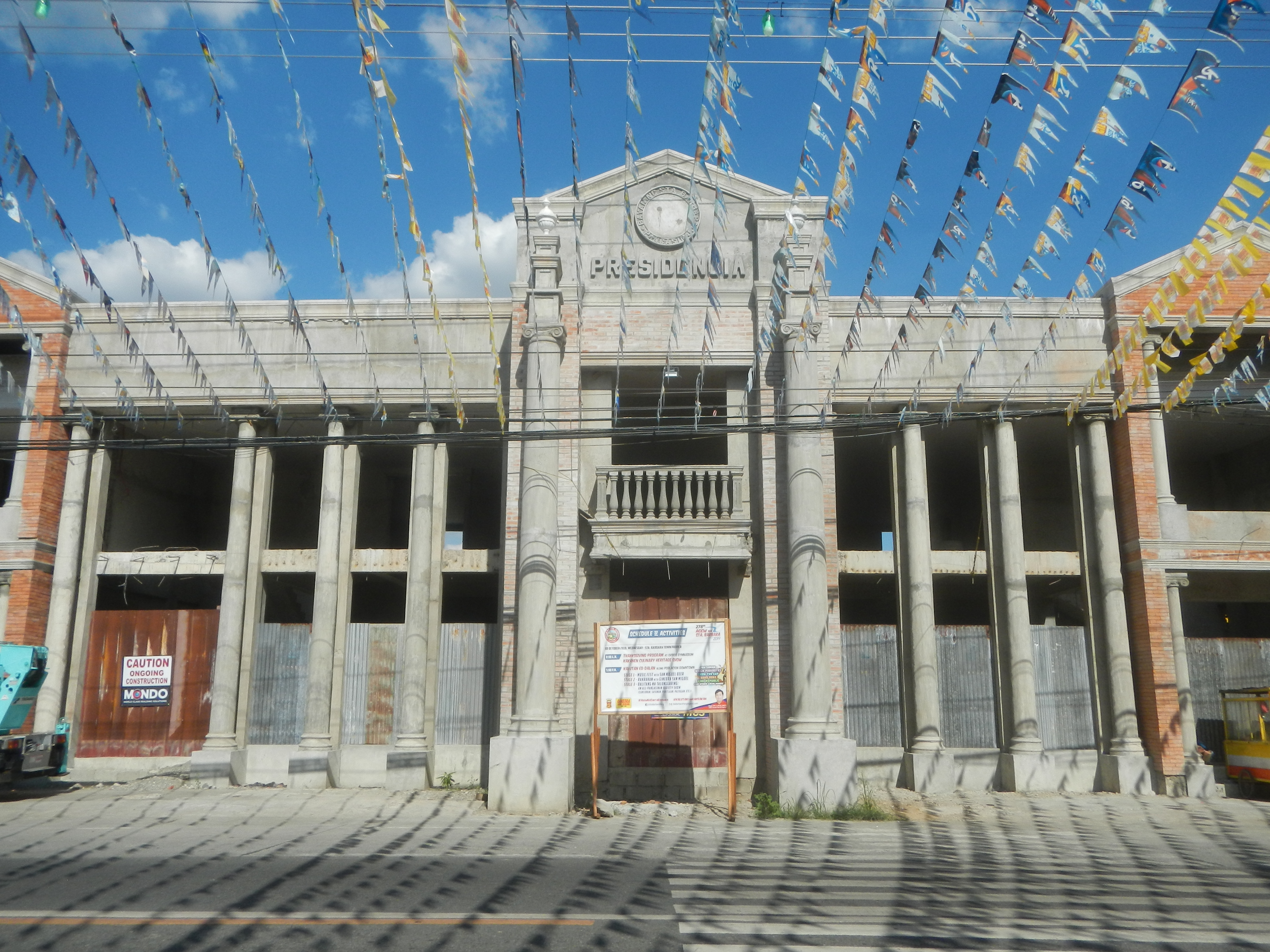
The Presidencia of Santa Barbara was the municipal seat of government.

The early settlers of Santa Barbara, like many Malay communities in Southeast Asia, were riverine people. They established their settlements along the banks of the Tolong and other rivers and creeks in the area. Consequently, before Spanish colonization, the town was known as "Tolong," named after its principal river, now called the Sinocalan River.

Santa Barbara is located in the northern part of the fertile Agno Valley and was once part of the ancient territory of Luyag na Kabuloan, ruled by Ari Kasikis during the Spanish conquest. Due to its strategic location, Santa Barbara was one of the early settlements in Pangasinan organized into pueblos by Spanish conquistadores in 1580. This organization was aimed at expediting the pacification of the province and facilitating tribute collection to support the Spanish colonial administration.

By 1741, the town had a significant Christian population. To prevent new converts from reverting to their old beliefs, a church was established with Santa Barbara as its patron saint. The early missionaries named the town Santa Barbara de Tolong. Over time, the residents adopted the name of their patron saint, Saint Barbara, dropping the original name "Tolong."

During the Filipino Revolution against Spanish rule, Santa Barbara served as the headquarters of Daniel Maramba, a local native and commanding officer of the Katipunan forces in central Pangasinan.

From 1903 to 1906, during the American occupation of the Philippines, Santa Barbara was merged with the municipality of Calasiao.

== Geography ==
The Municipality of Santa Barbara lies on a plain terrain in the northern part of the Agno River, at the center of Pangasinan. It is just west of the business center of Urdaneta City, with centuries-old mango trees lining the national highway to Santa Barbara. 9 kilometers (5.6 mi) further west is Dagupan along Lingayen Gulf, and to its south is the town of Malasiqui and beyond it the City of San Carlos.

Santa Barbara is situated 23.34 kilometers (14.50 mi) from the provincial capital Lingayen, and 206.96 kilometers (128.60 mi) from the country's capital city of Manila.

=== Barangays ===
Santa Barbara is politically subdivided into 29 barangays. Each barangay consists of puroks and some have sitios.

- Alibago
- Balingueo
- Banaoang
- Banzal
- Botao
- Cablong
- Carusucan
- Dalongue
- Erfe
- Gueguesangen
- Leet
- Malanay
- Maningding
- Maronong
- Maticmatic
- Minien East
- Minien West
- Nilombot
- Patayac
- Payas
- Tebag East
- Tebag West
- Poblacion Norte
- Poblacion Sur
- Primicias
- Sapang
- Sonquil
- Tuliao
- Ventenilla

=== Climate ===
Climate data for Santa Barbara, Pangasinan
Month	Jan	Feb	Mar	Apr	May	Jun	Jul	Aug	Sep	Oct	Nov	Dec	Year
Mean daily maximum °C (°F)	31 (88)	31 (88)	33 (91)	34 (93)	34 (93)	33 (91)	32 (90)	31 (88)	31 (88)	32 (90)	31 (88)	31 (88)	32 (90)
Mean daily minimum °C (°F)	21 (70)	21 (70)	23 (73)	25 (77)	25 (77)	25 (77)	25 (77)	24 (75)	24 (75)	24 (75)	23 (73)	22 (72)	24 (74)
Average precipitation mm (inches)	4.3 (0.17)	19.1 (0.75)	27.3 (1.07)	45.2 (1.78)	153.3 (6.04)	271.3 (10.68)	411.1 (16.19)	532 (20.9)	364.4 (14.35)	182.5 (7.19)	56.3 (2.22)	24.4 (0.96)	2,091.2 (82.3)
Average rainy days	3	2	3	5	14	17	22	23	21	13	7	4	134
Source: World Weather Online

== Demographics ==
Population census of Santa Barbara
Year	Pop.	±% p.a.
1903	10,367	—
1918	13,263	+1.66%
1939	15,125	+0.63%
1948	19,570	+2.90%
1960	24,005	+1.72%
1970	30,580	+2.45%
1975	34,418	+2.40%
1980	37,001	+1.46%
1990	48,056	+2.65%
1995	54,116	+2.25%
2000	64,261	+3.75%
2007	73,025	+1.78%
2010	76,637	+1.77%
2015	82,012	+1.30%
2020	92,187	+2.49%
2024	92,420	+0.06%
Source: Philippine Statistics Authority

Santa Barbara is populated mainly by Pangasinans with a sprinkling of other ethnic groups led by the Ilocanos.

It is largely a suburban community with much of its population densely concentrated in 29 barangays. By the year 2016, the town's population was projected to have reached 86,269, with a growth rate of 3.75 percent per year for the past seven years, faster than the national average.

A high level of self-sufficiency in food is likewise gleaned in the town's minimal rate of malnutrition of only 0.50 percent severely malnourished out of 5.12 percent malnourished -pre-school children. The public school system is also proud of having an unusually low drop-out rate in the elementary grades and high school.

== Economy ==
Poverty incidence of Santa Barbara (%)

Source: Philippine Statistics Authority

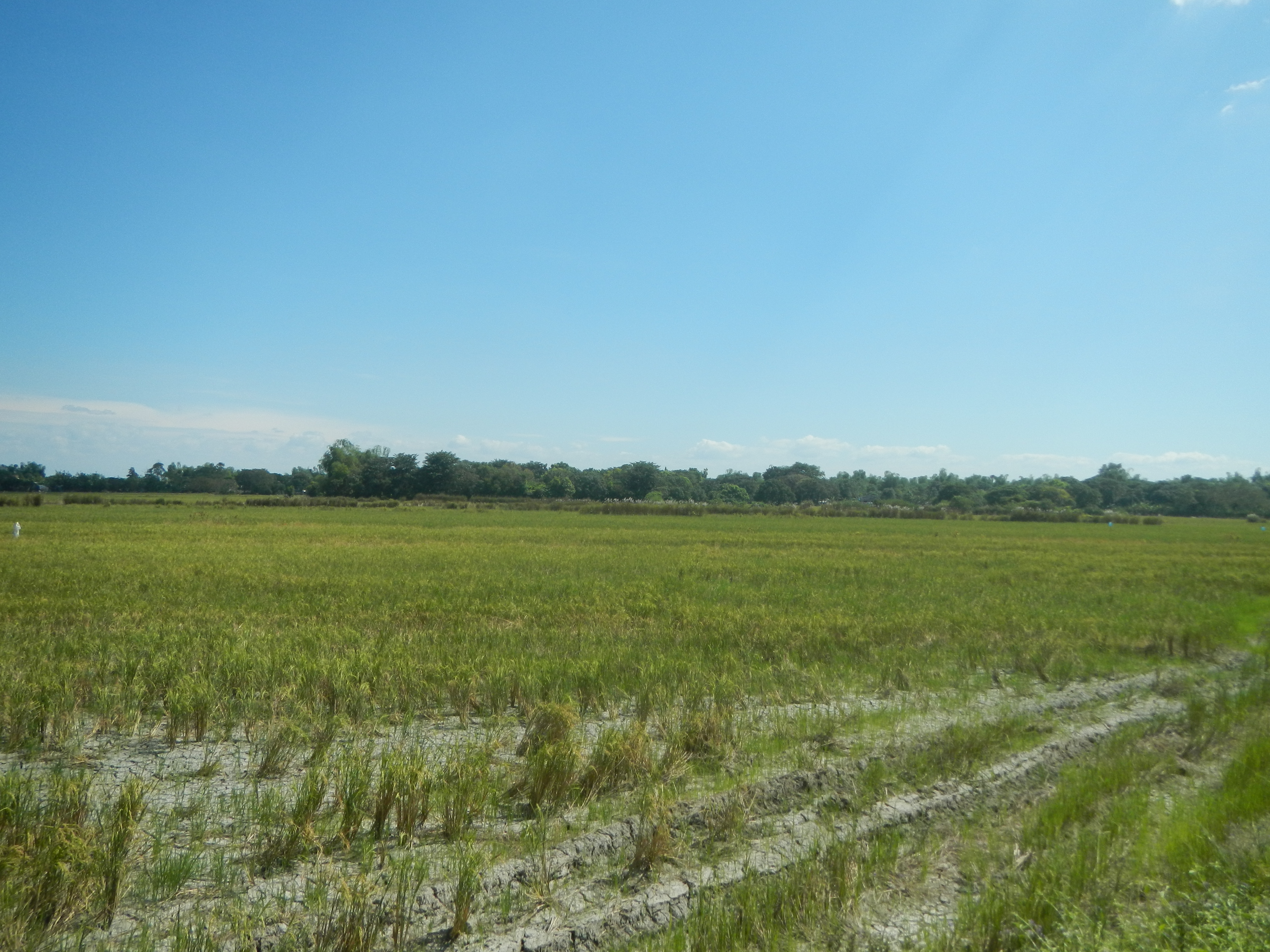
A rice field in Balingueo

More than half of the families or roughly 60 percent are farmers who till the northern part of the rich Agno Valley. The average family income as of the 2000 national census, was a low ₱9,662.67 (equivalent to ₱21,122 in 2021) a year. Maybe because the average farming family does not buy, but produce the bulk of its own food, family expenditures were lower at ₱7,545.42. The average Santa Barbaran family has a disposable income of over ₱2,000 a year, despite statistical data that had shown that a family in the Ilocos region needed ₱14,749.00 of income per year to survive.

The poverty rate in Santa Barbara is high as the average income is even lower than the regional poverty threshold. But food self-sufficiency has saved its town folks from sliding to the ranks of the very poor.

Although a large part of Santa Barbara is fast getting urbanized, the main economic activity remains to farm. Rice remains its main crop with 6,662 hectares (16,460 acres) or close to all its total tillable lands devoted to rice farming. The second most important crop is mango of which the town is famous as the home of age-old Philippine mango seedling nurseries, a veritable home industry in town.

Rice and mango are the only crops that are raised in all its 29 barangays. The third most important crop in a variety of vegetables followed by corn. Legumes and root crops are grown in small quantities.

Their livestock includes cattle, carabao, hogs, goats, and dogs. They likewise raise native chickens for their food and some poultry farms commercially produce chicken layers and broilers.

Out of the farm produce, Santa Barbara has developed its own food processing industry that includes the making of rice cakes like latik and suman, nata-de coco making, and pickles from different fruits.

It likewise has a highly developed clay tile and pottery industry coupled with non-farm-based processing industries like candle and soap making and the making of hollow blocks for construction. The town has one industrial plant, the Ginebra San Miguel gin manufacturing plant in Tebag West barangay along the national highway towards Dagupan.

The town's business and trading center in and around the public market features a variety of wholesale and retail and other services establishments from farm inputs to construction materials. The market serves as the place where its people buy their needs and sell their produce. Transportation between the commercial center and the many barangays is served by a large fleet of individually owned tricycles.

Santa Barbara's close proximity to Urdaneta City, has, however, constrained the growth of its trading sector.

== Urban development ==
Also owing to its suburban location and easy access to three nearby cities, Urdaneta, San Carlos, and Dagupan, Santa Barbara has attracted subdivision developers, both for middle-class and low-cost markets. As of mid-2008, it has attracted to its territory eight different housing projects including subdivisions developed by the company owned by Senate President Manny Villar, particularly Camella Homes, and a pilot Gawad Kalinga housing project for the very poor embarked by the town government and its private sector partners.

== Infrastructure ==
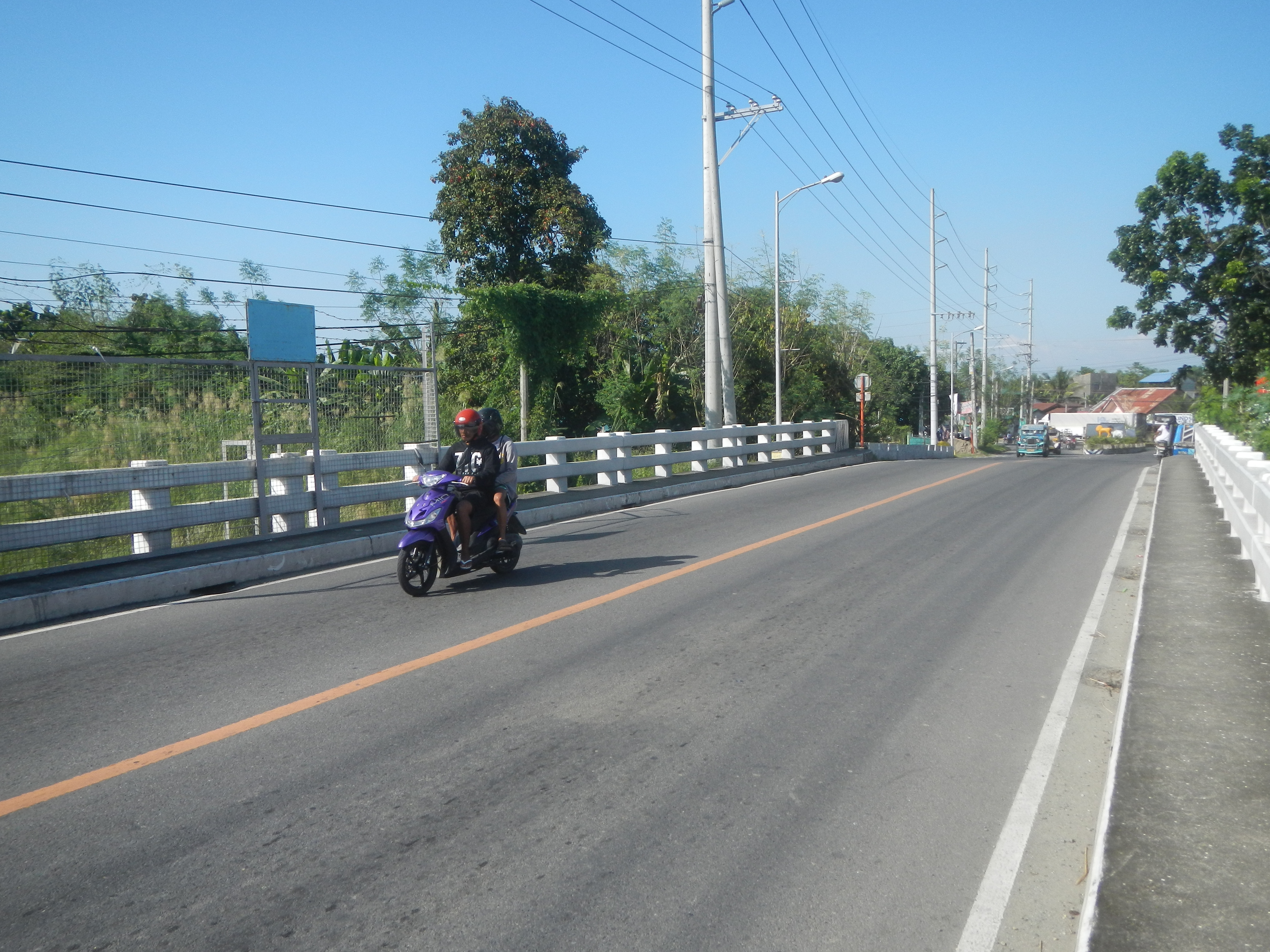
Maramba Bridge, which connects the poblacion to Urdaneta–Dagupan Road

The town has a total of 137.509 kilometers (85.444 mi) of road network classified into national, provincial, municipal, and barangay roads. All the national highways passing through town and those under the town government have been paved. The 17 kilometers (11 mi) of provincial roads are about three-fourths paved while more than half (67.3%) of 92.5 kilometers (57.5 mi) of barangay roads otherwise known as farm-to-market roads, needed concreting.

Unlike paved roads, electricity has reached all of the town's 29 barangays with about 80 percent of all households served. Power rates are much lower than in Metro Manila for both households, commercial and industrial users.

The local government-run Rural Health Unit and its 10 satellite barangay health centers, plus seven private medical clinics and one dental clinic serve the basic health needs of Santa Barbara residents.

== Government ==
=== Local government ===
Santa Barbara is part of the third congressional district of the province of Pangasinan. It is governed by a mayor, designated as its local chief executive, and by a municipal council as its legislative body in accordance with the Local Government Code. The mayor, vice mayor, and the councilors are elected directly by the people through an election which is being held every three years.

=== Elected officials ===
Santa Barbara Municipal Officials (2019–2022)
Position	Name
Mayor	Carlito S. Zaplan
Vice-Mayor	Roger Navarro
Councilors	Rogelio Q. Navarro
Councilors	Roderick B. Torio
Councilors	Buena D. Ico
Councilors	Roger S. Zaplan
Councilors	Angelo D. Tamayo
Councilors	Bobby G. Barbiran
Councilors	Eleazar Q. Dalope
Councilors	Sherwin N. Pioquinto

== Education ==
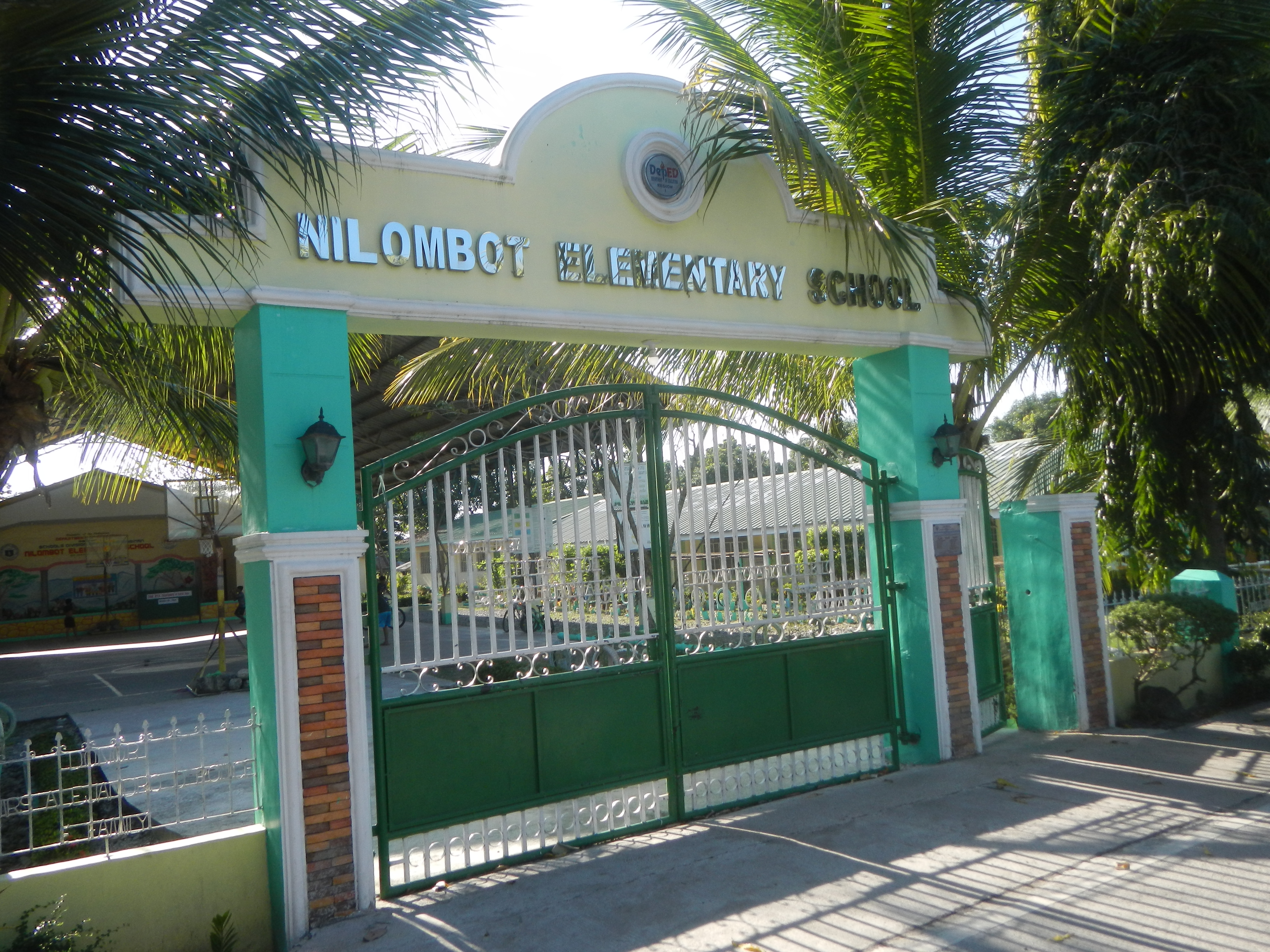
Nilombot Elementary School

The Municipality of Santa Barbara has an extensive public elementary and high school system. It has a total of 26 elementary schools supervised by two school districts plus 7 public high schools. These are staffed by 418 teachers and other school personnel with a student body of over 15,000 children in any given year. Their healthy teacher to pupil ratio averaging one to 34 in the elementary grades and one is to 41 in high school and there are minimal drop-out rates of two percent in the elementary grades and less than four in every 100 students that enter high school. This was the state of things in Santa Barbara when the local leadership changed in mid-2007.

There are two schools district Offices which govern all educational institutions within the municipality. These offices oversees the management and operations of all private and public, from primary to secondary schools. These are Sta. Barbara I Schools District Office, and Sta. Barbara II Schools District Office.

=== Primary and elementary schools ===
- Alibago Elementary School
- Balingueo Elementary School
- Banaoang Central School
- Banzal Elementary School
- Botao-Tebag Elementary School
- Cablong Elementary School
- Carosucan Elementary School
- Dalongue Elementary School
- Daroy Elementary School
- Eagle's Nest Christian Academy & Foundational Learning Center
- East Central School
- Gueguesangen Elementary School
- Gymnazo Christian Academy
- Leet Elementary School
- Living Lights Learning Center
- Malanay Elementary School
- Maningding-Ventinilla Elementary School
- Maronong Elementary School
- Maticmatic Elementary School
- Maticmatic II Elementary School
- Minien-Tebag Elementary School
- Nilombot Elementary School
- Patayak Elementary School
- Payas Elementary School
- Pehvee Izel School
- Primicias Elementary School
- Sonquil Elementary School
- Sta. Barbara Central School
- Tebag Elementary School
- Tuliao Elementary School

=== Secondary schools ===
- Banaoang National High School
- Botao National High School
- Daniel Maramba National High School
- Maticmatic National High School
- Minien National High School
- Payas National High School
- Tuliao National High School

== Religion ==
The heritage Santa Barbara Parish of the Holy Family Church, built in 1716, is part of the Roman Catholic Archdiocese of Lingayen-Dagupan, Vicariate III.

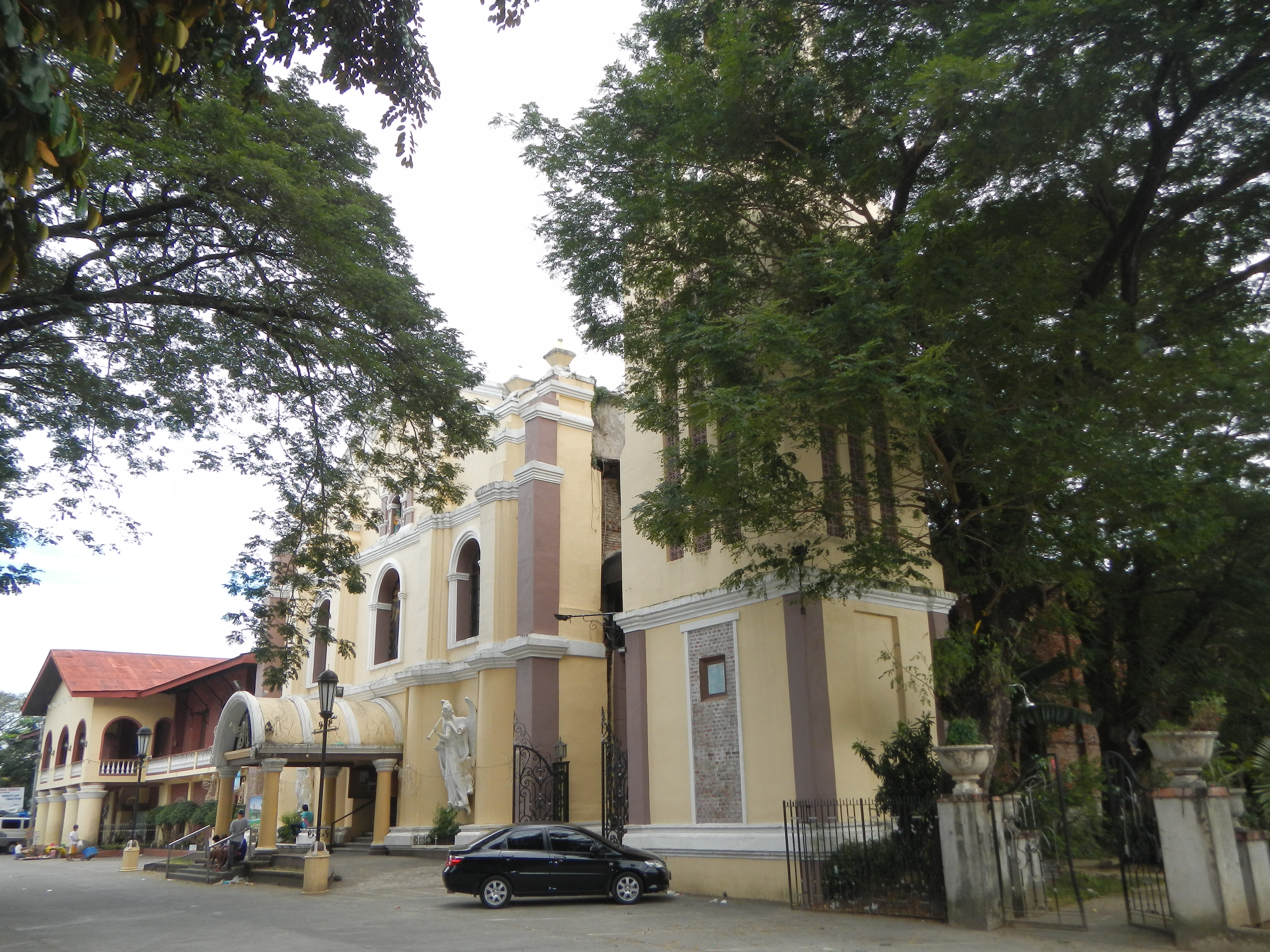
Façade of the Church

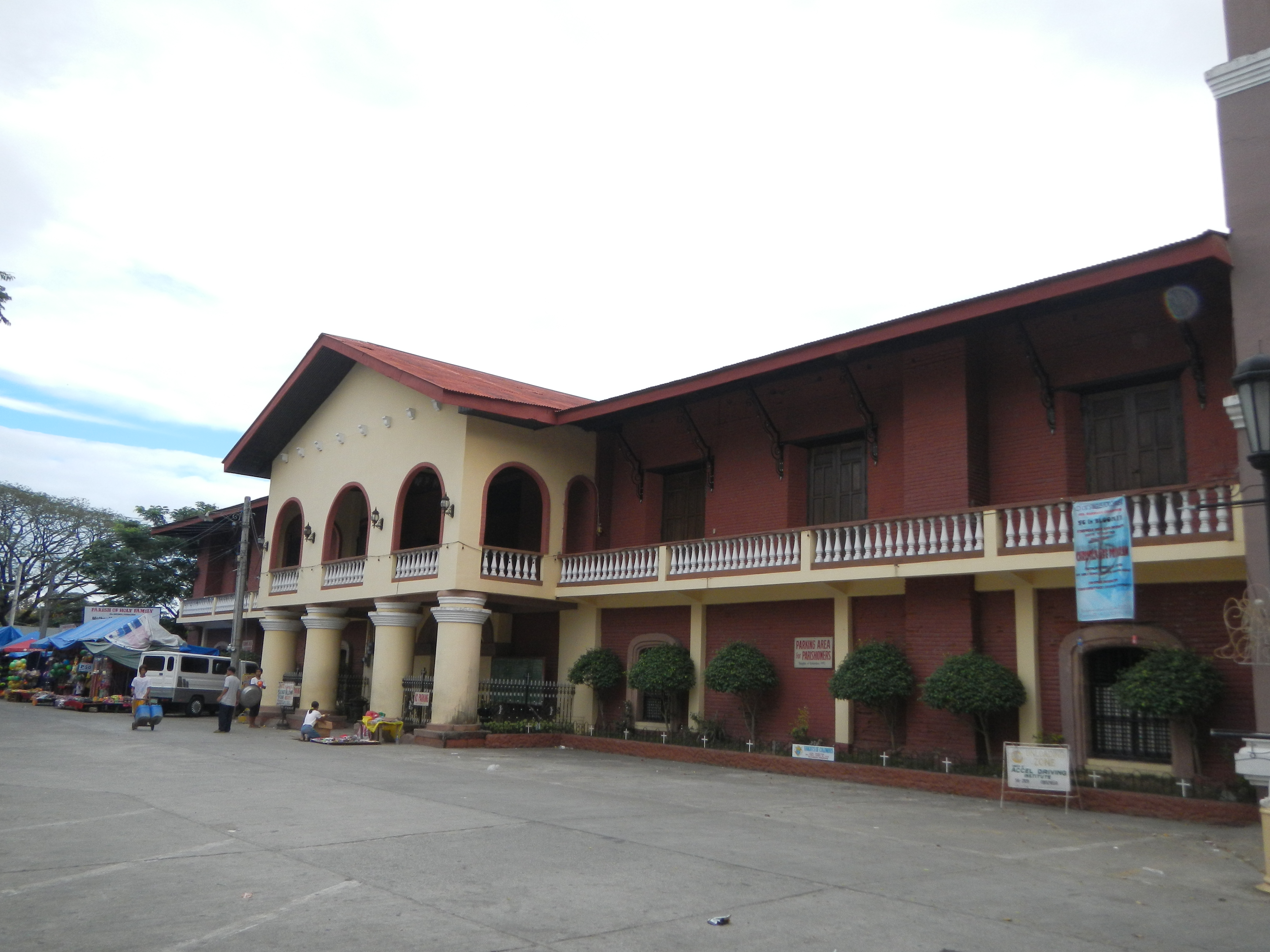
Parish Office and Convent Façade

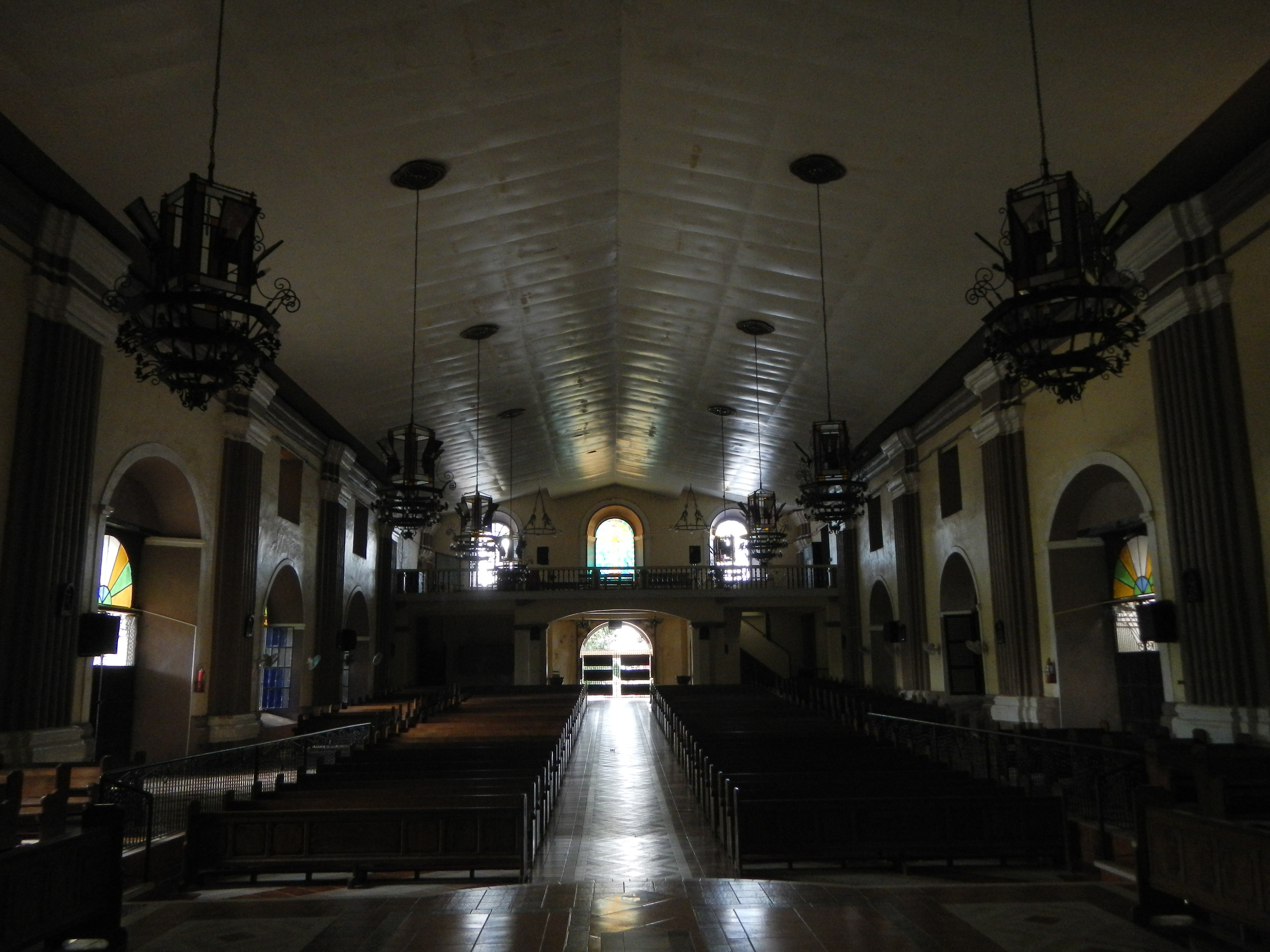
Interior

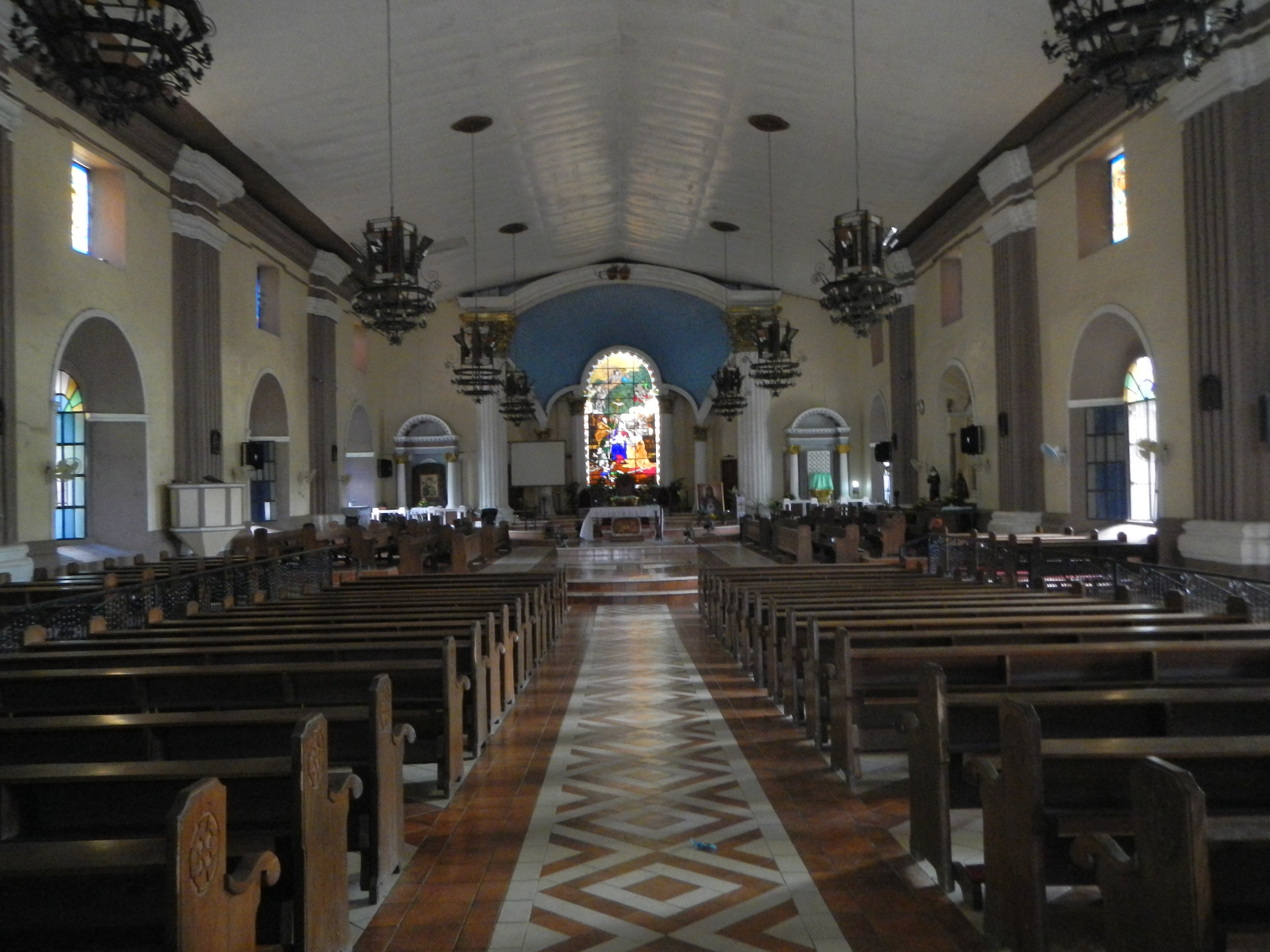
Far view of the altar

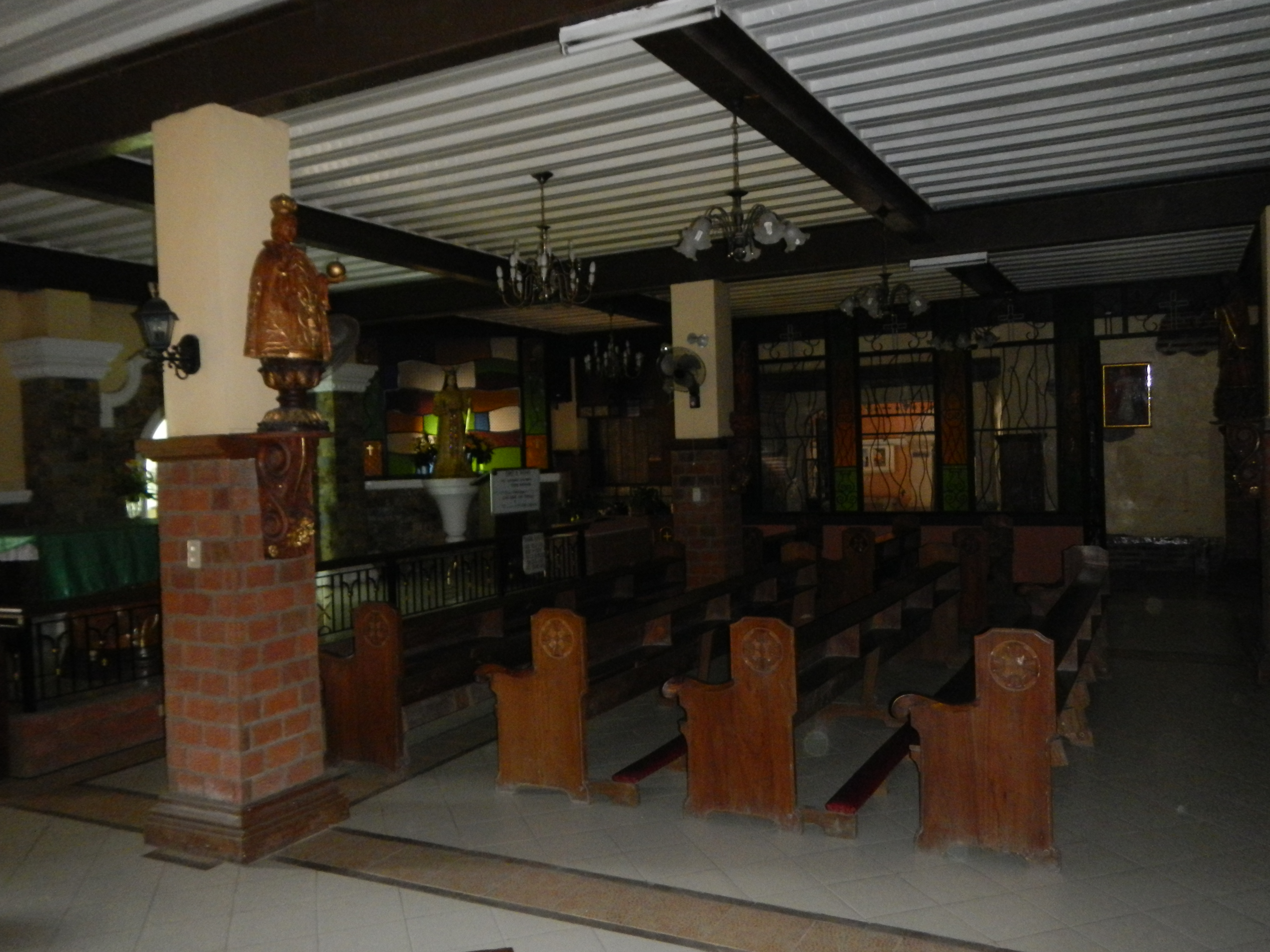
Interior of the Oratory

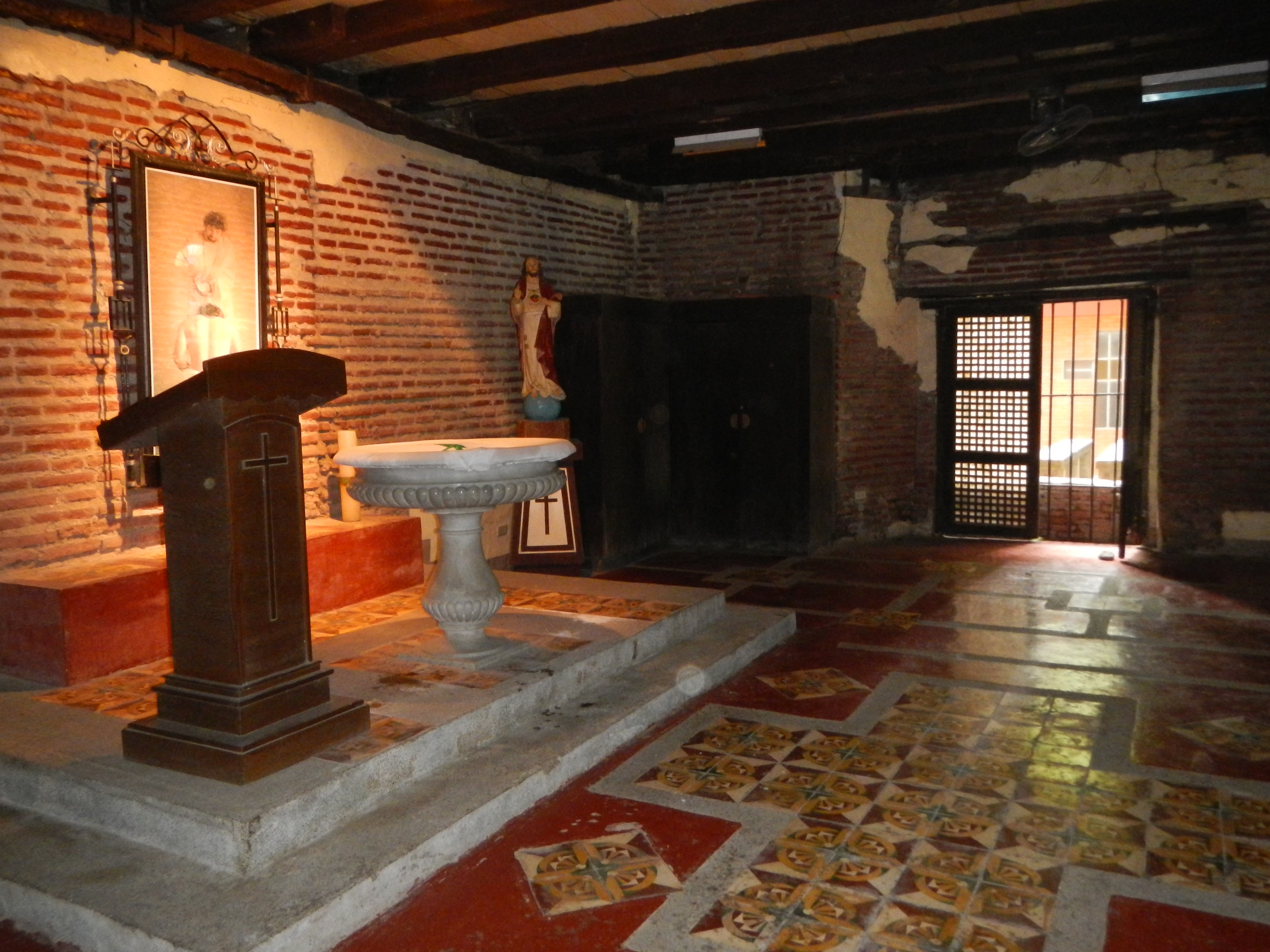
Oratory

== Gallery ==
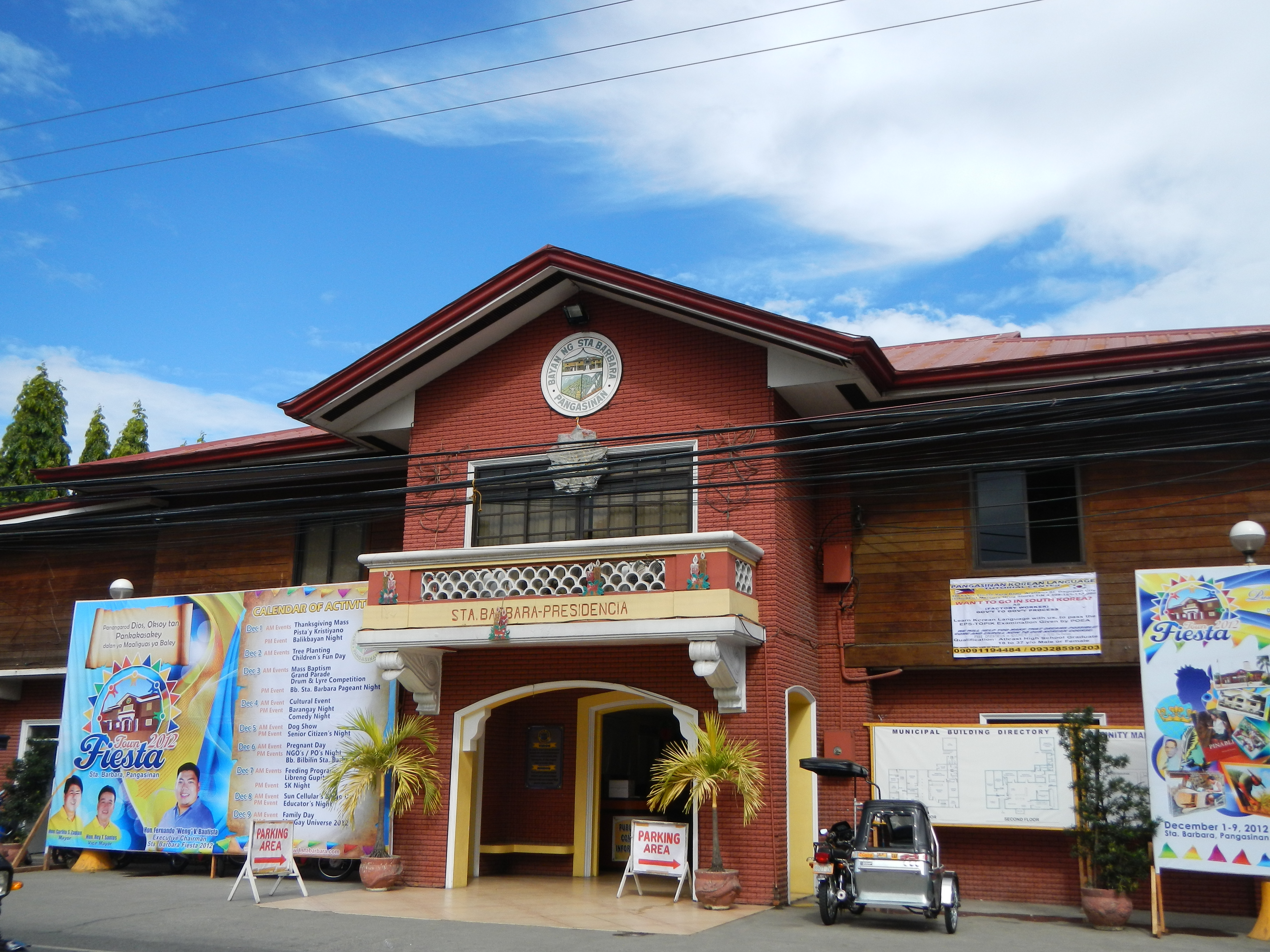
Town hall

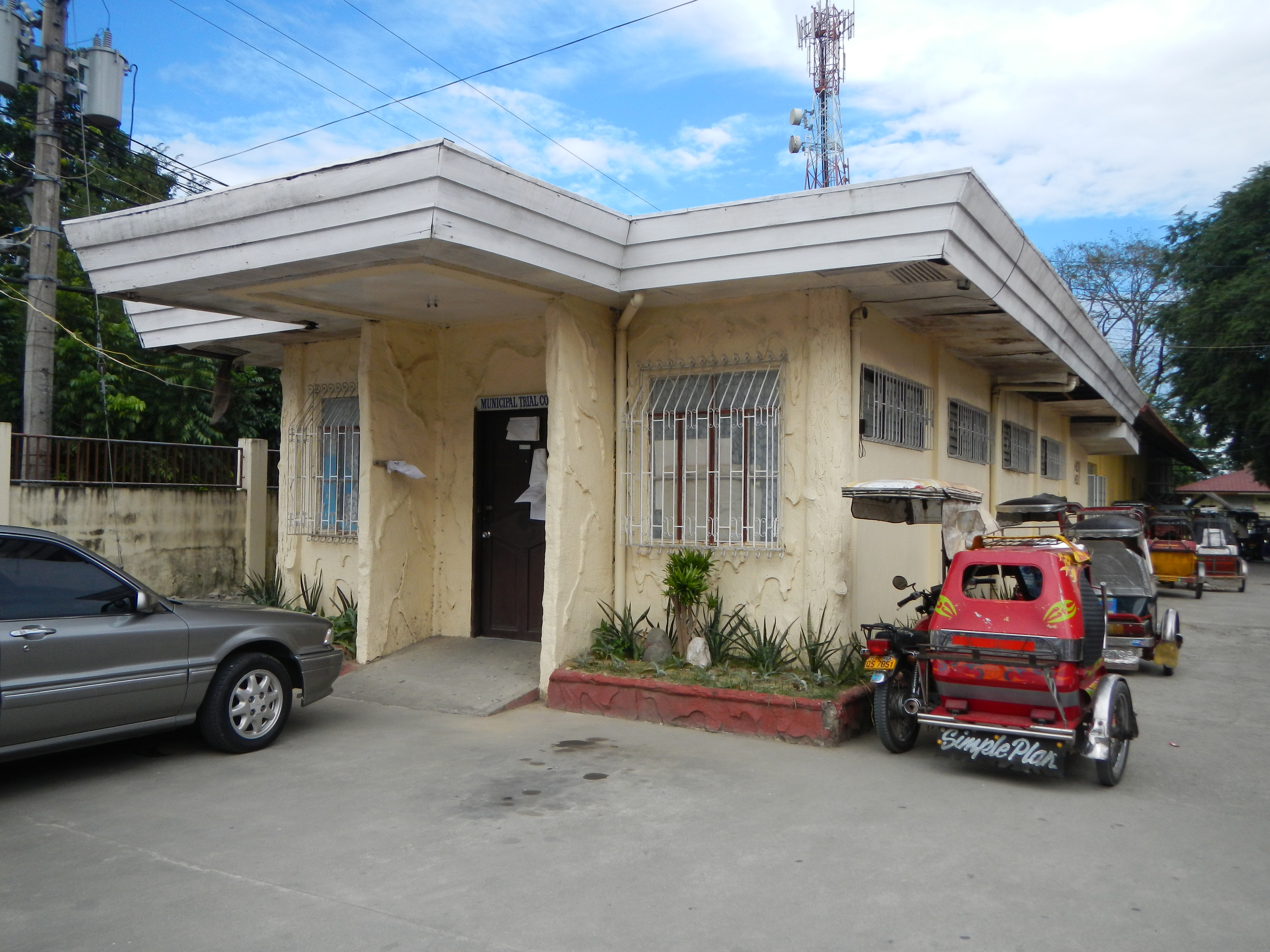
Halls of Justice, Municipal Court

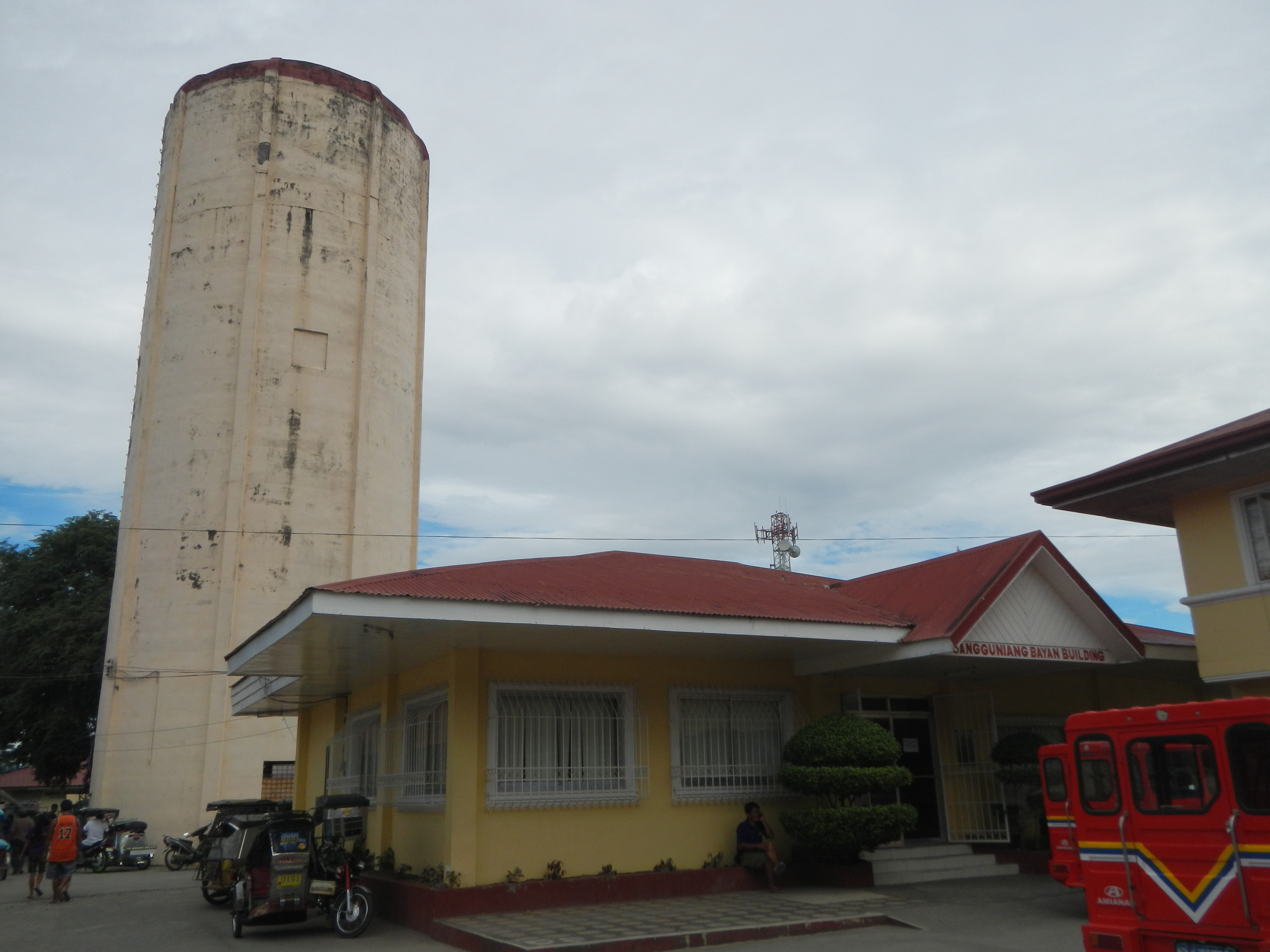
Water district tower

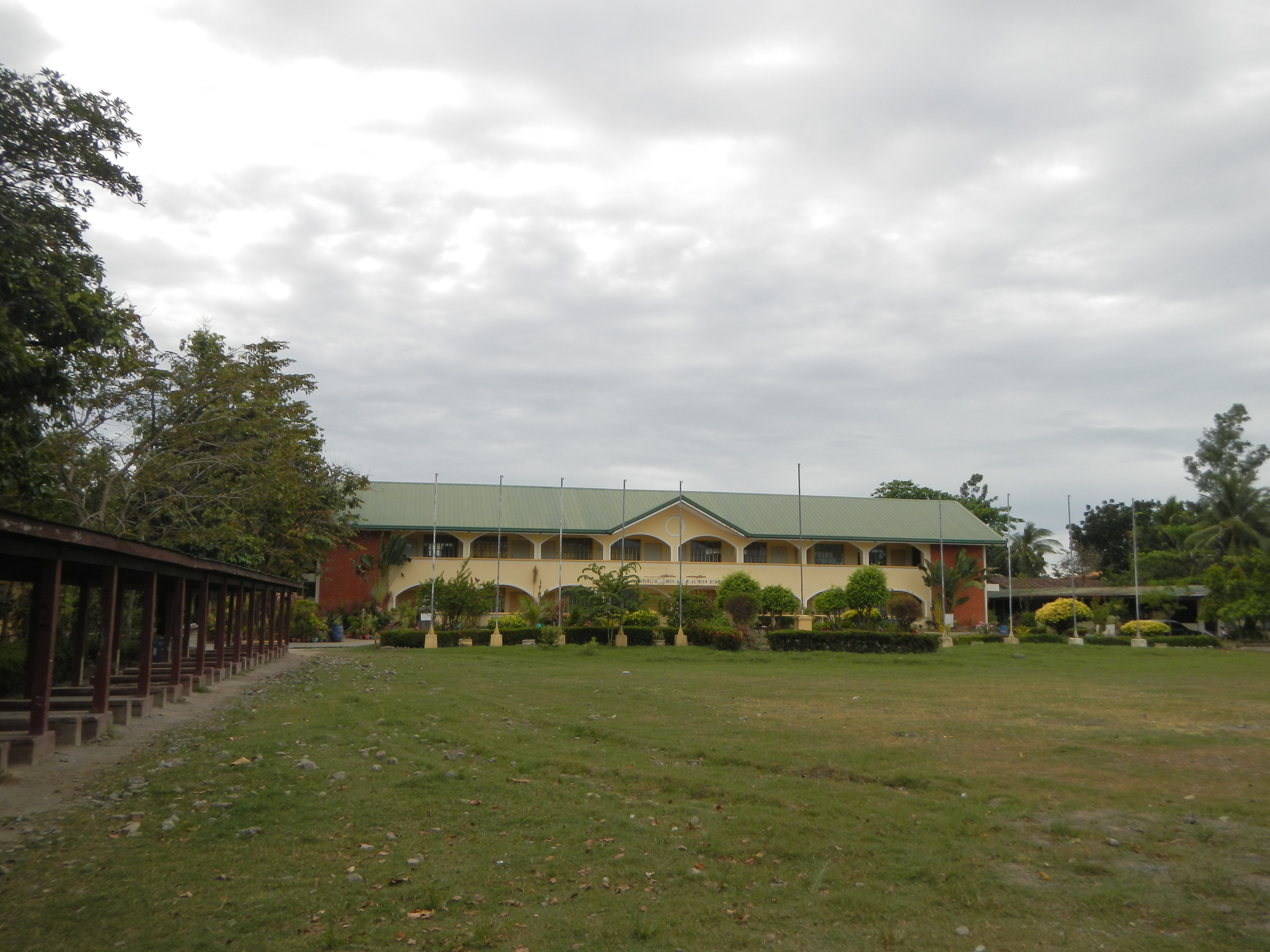
Façade of the Don Daniel B. Maramba High School

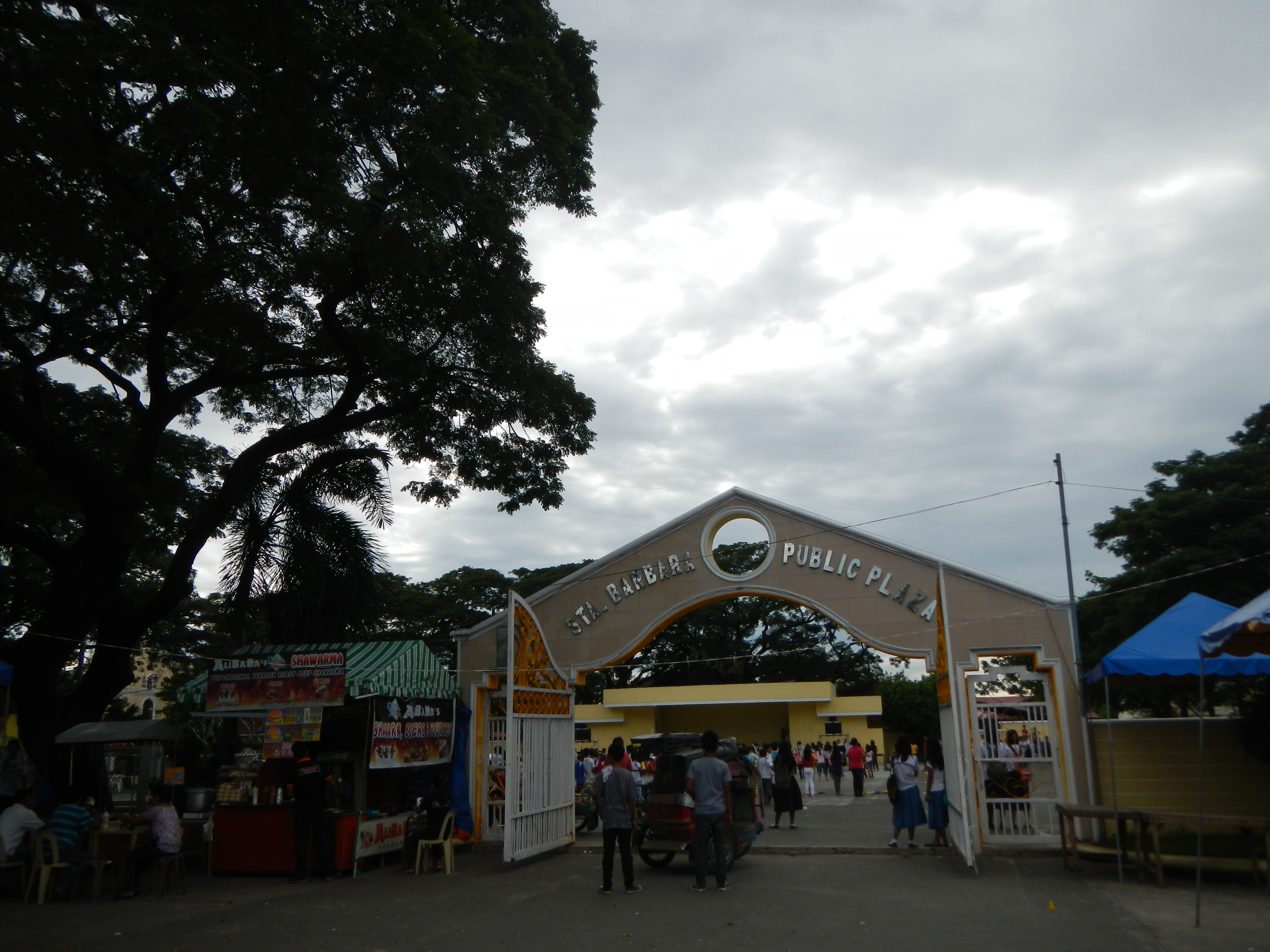
Santa Barbara Public Plaza

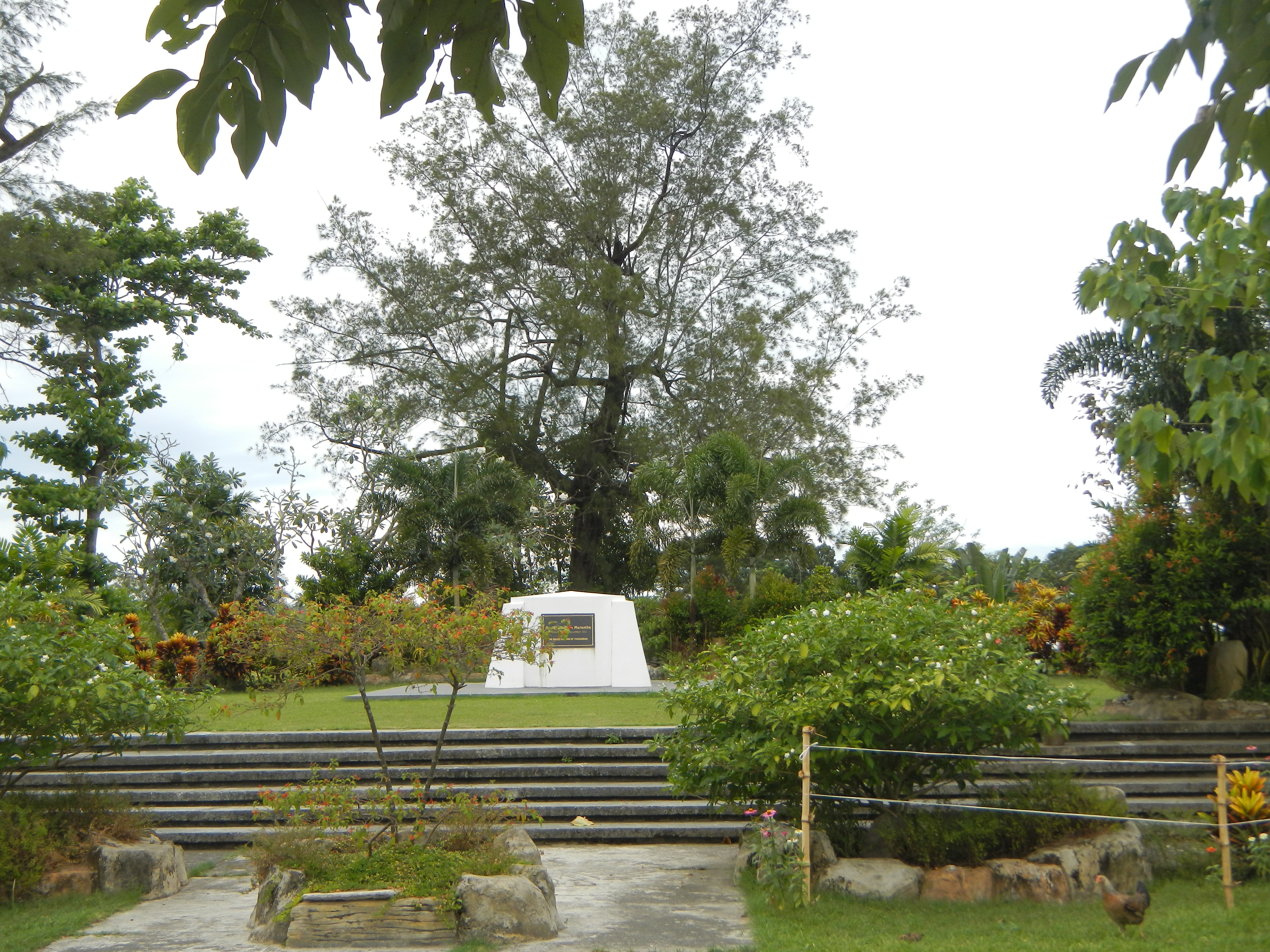
Grave of Daniel Maramba
