= Rose Marie Arenas =

Filipino politician (born 1940)

The Honorable Rose Marie Arenas
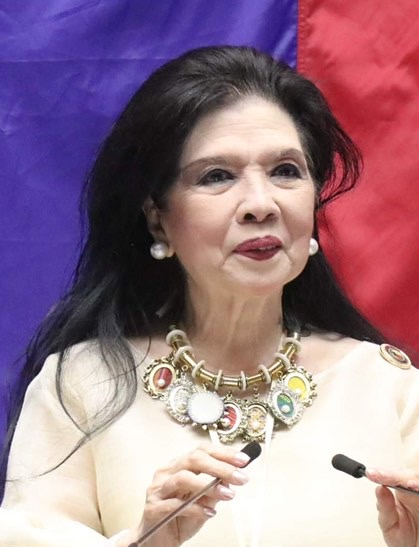
- Arenas in 2021

Deputy Speaker of the House of Representatives of the Philippines
- In office July 29, 2019 – June 1, 2022
- House Speaker: Alan Peter Cayetano; Lord Allan Velasco
- In office August 29, 2018 – June 4, 2019
- House Speaker: Gloria Macapagal Arroyo

Member of the Philippine House of Representatives from Pangasinan's 3rd district
- In office June 30, 2013 – June 30, 2022
- Preceded by: Maria Rachel Arenas
- Succeeded by: Maria Rachel Arenas

Personal details
- Born: Rose Marie Bosch Jimenez; December 10, 1940 (age 85) Malasiqui, Pangasinan, Philippine Commonwealth
- Party: PDP (2016–present)
- Other political affiliations: Liberal (2012–2016); Lakas (1998–2012); NPC (1995–1998)
- Spouse: Ramon Arenas
- Children: 4 (including Maria Rachel)
- Education: University of Santo Tomas

Rose Marie "Baby" Bosch Jimenez Arenas (born December 10, 1940) is a Filipino politician and socialite who featured prominently in the political scene of the Philippines in the 1990s. She was relatively unknown until 1993, when the Philippine Daily Inquirer reported that she had a past intimate relationship with the then-Philippine President Fidel V. Ramos. The scandal grew when within days after the revelation, the Philippine Securities and Exchange Commission ruled against the owners of the Philippine Daily Inquirer in a dispute involving one-third of the stock ownership of the newspaper. It was widely reported that the adverse ruling came about due to presidential displeasure over the report, although no concrete proof of such ever emerged.

President Fidel V. Ramos never publicly acknowledged a past relationship with Ms. Arenas, although neither did he emphatically deny the report. The scandal, though widely reported at that time, had no visible impact on the Ramos presidency, and quickly passed. For her part, Ms. Arenas attempted to parlay her unexpected fame into electoral victory, running for the Philippine Senate in 1995 and for the House of Representatives for the 1st district of Makati in 1998, both of which were unsuccessful.

Ms. Arenas is also known for her considerable philanthropic efforts and support for the arts. She famously convinced the legendary Italian tenor Luciano Pavarotti to perform in Manila for the first time.

Arenas' daughter, Rachel, was the incumbent representative of Pangasinan's 3rd district. She was set to run unopposed in the 2013 elections but gave way to her mother.

She is served as Deputy Speaker of the House of Representatives of the Philippines from 2018 to 2022.

== Early and personal life ==
Arenas was born Rose Marie Bosch Jimenez in 1940 in Malasiqui, Pangasinan. Her parents were Alfredo Jimenez, an accountant at the Bureau of Internal Revenue (BIR) and a member of a modestly rich family from Makati; and Remedios Bosch, an opera singer and a music professor at the University of the East (UE). Her father was known as the disciplinarian in the family while her mother influenced her love for charity work, culture, and the performing arts. Due in part to her well-connected mother who sang in the prestigious opera galas in Manila and abroad, Arenas was exposed early to Manila's high society.

Her strict upbringing resulted in an almost planned life during her formative years. She took up piano and voice lessons when she was a child; an obvious consequence of her mother's profession and passion. In college, her father insisted that she take up accountancy at the University of Santo Tomas (UST); again, following the footsteps of her father. Throughout her student years, she was not allowed to go out with friends, to have a boyfriend, or to enjoy life the way other teenagers of her time did. She led a life that had a very definite pattern – home-school-home.

Discipline was so stern in the young life of Arenas that it was almost ironic that she was allowed by her parents to become a professional model. For three years during the 1960s, she modelled for some of the leading stores and designers in the Philippines. She was even allowed to join the Miss Philippines pageant– convincing her parents that the proceeds of the event would go to charity – and even became a finalist in the event.

The choice of her husband was also the result of parental influence in her personal life. After graduating from college, her parents arranged her wedding to Ramon Arenas, a businessman engaged in the shipping industry. Ramon's mother is the very wealthy Doña Julieta Hofileña Lopez, sister to industrialist Don Eugenio Hofileña Lopez (ex-owner of Meralco, Negros Navigation, ABS-CBN Corporation) and former Vice President Fernando Lopez (owner of the University of Iloilo). The López family of Iloilo were one of the wealthiest clans in the Philippines. Although an adopted child, Doña Julieta was the only daughter of Doña Presentacion Hofileña and as such was an equal beneficiary of all the Lopez assets and haciendas when Doña Presentacion and her husband died. As the favorite daughter-in-law of Doña Julieta who inherited much of her own heirloom jewelry, this may explain why Arenas is one of the very few females outside of the tightly knit Lopez clan to own such select Philippine jewel sets.

Although Baby and Ramon had five children (John, Christopher, Ramoncito, Maria Rachel, and Roberto), the two eventually separated and she never married again.

From her 3 children, she received 10 grandchildren (Marga, John, Martin, Therese, John Francis, Michael, Andrea, Sebastian, Joaquin Alfonso, and Christopher Jr.)

== Wealth ==
Arenas is an effective businesswoman. Although she was a Blue Lady of Imelda Marcos, much of her wealth came before her association with the Philippine first lady. From her husband Ramon she received numerous houses in Forbes Park and Dasmariñas Village in Makati on top of priceless jewelry (Ex. A Ruby and Diamond necklace once belonging to an Indian maharaja) and personal effects from her mother-in-law. After 1986 and essentially on her own, Arenas dabbled into supplying the Philippine Military with footwear and other essentials, adding more to her family's assets on her own stewardship. She is assumed/speculated to be worth in the billions of dollars.

Net Worth: (Private)
