= Cipriano Primicias Jr. =

Filipino lawyer and politician (1931–2012)

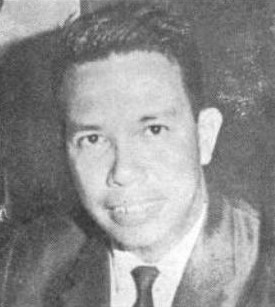
- Primicias in 1967

Deputy Minister of Local Government
- In office 1981–1986
- Minister: Jose Roño

Member of the Philippine House of Representatives for Pangasinan's 3rd district
- In office December 30, 1961 – December 30, 1967
- Preceded by: Jose Parayno
- Succeeded by: Corazon Primicias
- In office December 30, 1957 – June 24, 1960
- Preceded by: Jose Parayno
- Succeeded by: Jose Parayno

Governor of Pangasinan
- In office December 30, 1967 – December 30, 1971
- Preceded by: Francisco Duque
- Succeeded by: Vicente Millora

Personal details
- Born: Cipriano Benito Primicias Jr. April 17, 1931 Lingayen, Pangasinan, Philippine Islands
- Died: December 3, 2012 (aged 81) Dagupan, Pangasinan, Philippines
- Party: Nacionalista
- Spouse(s): Corazon Velasco; Norma Trinidad
- Children: 7
- Relatives: Cipriano Primicias Sr. (father)
- Nickname: Tito

Cipriano "Tito" Benito Primicias Jr. (April 17, 1931 – December 3, 2012) was a Filipino lawyer and politician who served as a member of the Philippine House of Representatives for Pangasinan's 3rd congressional district from 1957 to 1960 and 1961 to 1967. A member of the Nacionalista Party, he later served as governor of Pangasinan from 1967 to 1971 and deputy minister of local government from 1981 to 1986.

== Early life and education ==
Primicias was born on April 17, 1931, in Barrio Libsong, Lingayen, Pangasinan, to former Senate majority leader Cipriano Primicias Sr. and Nieves Benito. He attended Lingayen Elementary School for his primary education. He went to three institutions for his secondary education: Araullo High School for his first year, Santa Barbara High School in Pangasinan for his second year, and then transferred to Pangasinan High School for his third year, where he graduated in 1947. He served as president of the student council, won school debate contests, and managed the high school basketball team.

Primicias later went to the University of the Philippines in Manila, where he earned his associate in arts degree in 1949. He studied law at a state university from 1949 to 1952 across seven semesters, but briefly quit to pursue employment. He ventured into many jobs to support himself despite his parents' affluence, such as a shoeshiner, cigarette vendor, jeepney conductor and driver, jukebox and amplifier operator and mechanic, watch repairman, auto mechanic, and factory worker. It was also during his years as a law student that he served as a technical assistant in his father's Senate office. Primicias finished his legal studies at the University of Manila in 1955, earning a Bachelor of Laws degree and passing the Bar examinations in the same year.

== Career ==
Primicias's political beginnings started in 1952, when he was elected secretary of the Senate finance committee. By 1956, Primicias had been working as a technical assistant for the entire Senate. He ran a year later for Pangasinan's 3rd congressional district in the House of Representatives against incumbent Jose Parayno. He served until the third year of his term as representative, after the House Electoral Tribunal granted Parayno's electoral protest, unseating him in 1960. Primicias successfully regained the seat later in 1961 and was elected again in 1965. He supported Ferdinand Marcos for his first presidential bid in 1965.

Primicias did not finish his third congressional term after winning the governorship of Pangasinan in 1967, serving until 1971.

He made an unsuccessful bid as senator in 1971, placing last among 16 candidates.

After Marcos declared martial law in 1972, Primicias migrated to Canada, living in a basement and doing manual labor to provide for his family's needs. He returned to the Philippines after several years abroad.

In 1981, he was appointed to the cabinet of Prime Minister Cesar Virata as deputy minister of local government, serving until 1986. He ran for governor again in 1998, but lost to Victor Agbayani.

== Personal life and legacy ==
Primicias married Corazon Velasco on May 27, 1954, with whom he had seven children. In his later years, he was married to Norma Trinidad. He was a columnist for a provincial newspaper called The Sunday Punch, writing under the “This Side of the Fence” column.

Primicias died of cardiac arrest on December 3, 2012. He was buried in his hometown of Santa Barbara.

Barangay Primicias in Mapandan, Pangasinan, formerly called Torres-Bonton, was renamed in his honor. The Governor's Island, part of the Hundred Islands National Park in Alaminos, was previously known as Primicias Island in his honor.

== Electoral history ==
Electoral history of Cipriano Primicias Jr.
Year	Office	Party	Votes received				Result
Year	Office	Party	Total	%	P.	Swing	Result
1957	Representative (Pangasinan–3rd)	Nacionalista	—N/a	—N/a	1st	—N/a	Lost (Note: His election as the first placer was annulled by the House Electoral Tribunal in 1960 following an electoral protest, after which Jose Parayno was proclaimed the winner of the 1957 elections.)
1961	Representative (Pangasinan–3rd)	Nacionalista	—N/a	—N/a	1st	—N/a	Won
1965	Representative (Pangasinan–3rd)	Nacionalista	39,122	52.98%	1st	—N/a	Won
1967	Governor of Pangasinan	Nacionalista	—N/a	—N/a	1st	—N/a	Won
1998	Governor of Pangasinan	Unknown	—N/a	—N/a	—N/a	—N/a	Lost
1971	Senator of the Philippines	Nacionalista	2,099,148	22.28%	16th	—N/a	Lost

House of Representatives of the Philippines
Preceded by Jose Parayno	Member of the Philippine House of Representatives for Pangasinan's 3rd district 1961–1967	Succeeded by Corazon Primicias
Preceded by Jose Parayno	Member of the Philippine House of Representatives for Pangasinan's 3rd district 1957–1960	Succeeded by Jose Parayno
Political offices
Preceded by Francisco Duque	Governor of Pangasinan; 1967–1971	Succeeded by Vicente Millora
