= Daniel Maramba =

Filipino revolutionary and statesman

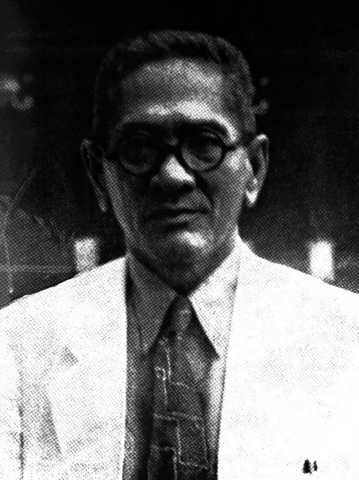
- Photograph from The Commercial & Industrial Manual of the Philippines, 1941

Senator of the Philippines
- Died before taking office

Member of the House of Representatives of the Philippines from Pangasinan's 3rd District
- In office 5 June 1934 – 28 December 1941
- Preceded by: Antonio Mejia
- Succeeded by: Pascual Beltran

Governor of Pangasinan
- In office 16 October 1916 – 15 October 1922
- Preceded by: Aquilino Calvo
- Succeeded by: Teofilo Sison

Personal details
- Born: Daniel Maramba y Bautista; July 21, 1870 Santa Barbara, Pangasinan, Captaincy General of the Philippines
- Died: December 28, 1941 (aged 71) Quezon City, Rizal, Commonwealth of the Philippines
- Cause of death: Tuberculosis
- Party: Nacionalista

Daniel Maramba y Bautista (July 21, 1870 – December 28, 1941) was a Filipino revolutionary and statesman dubbed the "Grand Old Man of Pangasinan".

== Early life and education ==
Daniel Maramba was born on July 21, 1870, in Santa Barbara, Pangasinan to Guillermo Maramba and Maria Bautista.

He received a Bachelor of Arts degree from the San Juan de Letran College in 1888 and a degree in agriculture from the University of Santo Tomas in 1892. During this time, he was briefly imprisoned for refusing to kiss the hand of a friar.

== Career ==
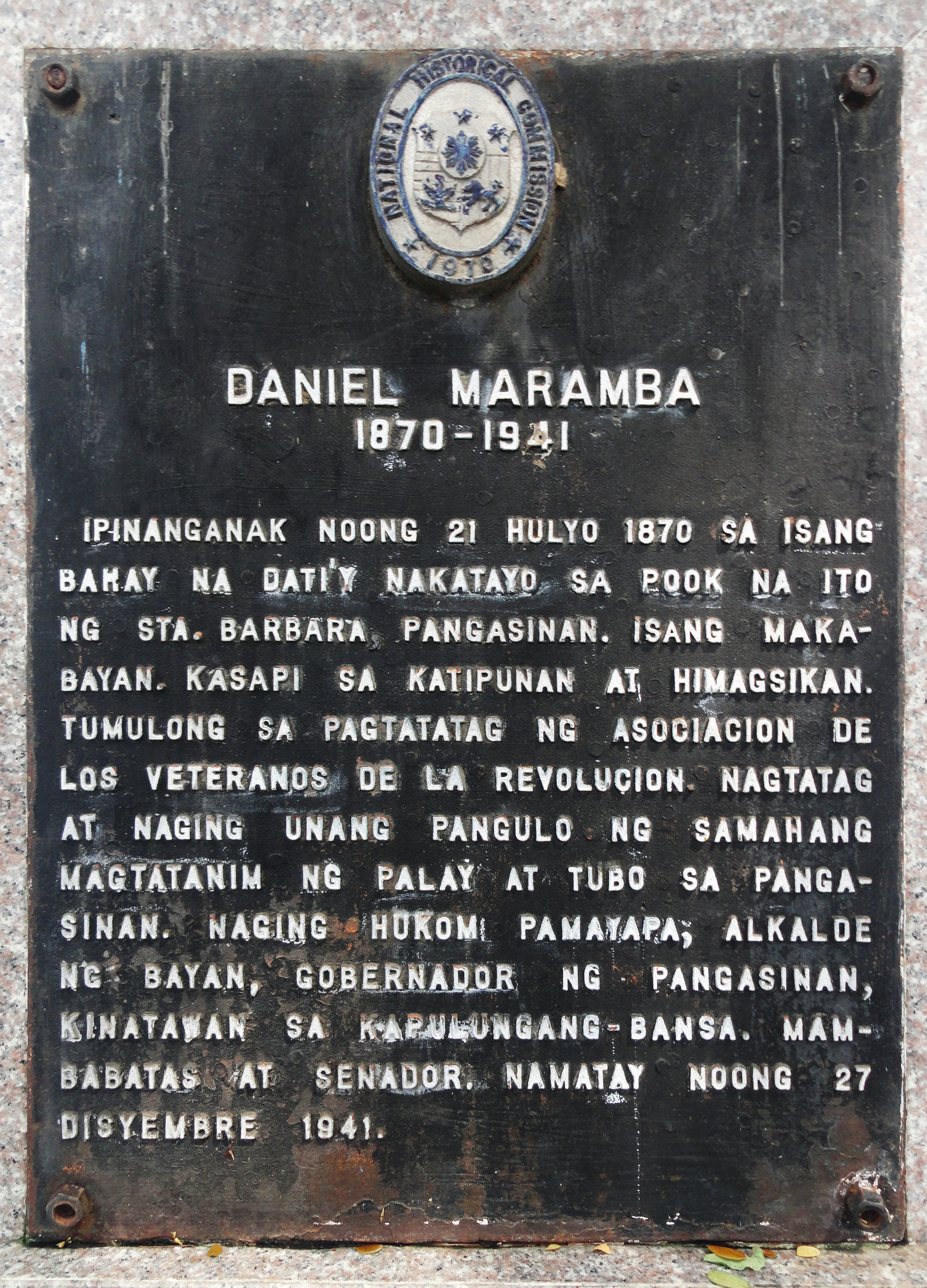
National historical marker for Maramba located in Santa Barbara

Maramba returned to Santa Barbara as served as the town's Justice of the Peace of from 1895 to 1898.

=== Military career ===
In 1893, Maramba joined the Katipunan with the codename Baga and led the revolutionary forces in central Pangasinan during the Philippine Revolution, liberating the towns of Mangaldan and Dagupan from the Spaniards in 1898 and attaining the rank of lieutenant-colonel. During the Philippine-American War, he fought American forces until his capture in 1901, but was later released and allowed to resume his administrative career.

=== Political career ===
Maramba then became Santa Barbara's Municipal Secretary from 1902 to 1903 and Municipal President from 1907 to 1908. In 1916, he was elected as Governor of Pangasinan and served until 1922. It was during his tenure that the Provincial Capitol building in Lingayen was built from 1917 to 1918.

Maramba was elected as representative from the 3rd District of Pangasinan to the House of Representatives of the Philippines and the National Assembly from 1934 to 1941. He was elected to the Philippine Senate on 11 November 1941 but died from tuberculosis at the Quezon Institute in Quezon City on 28 December 1941, three days before his term was due to begin amid the Japanese invasion of the Philippines during World War II.

Maramba was also one of the founders of the first Masonic lodge in Pangasinan in 1918.

== Personal life ==
Maramba was married to Pelagia Garcia since 1894. His uncle, Valentin Diaz, was one of the original founders of the Katipunan in 1892.

== See also ==
- List of Philippine legislators who died in office
