= Pangasinan's 3rd congressional district =

Legislative district of the Philippines

- Constituency for the House of Representatives of the Philippines
- Boundary of Pangasinan's 3rd congressional district in Pangasinan

- Location of Pangasinan within the Philippines
- Province: Pangasinan
- Region: Ilocos Region
- Population: 708,245 (2020)
- Electorate: 441,956 (2022)
- Major settlements: 6 LGUs: Cities; San Carlos; Municipalities; Bayambang; Calasiao; Malasiqui; Mapandan; Santa Barbara
- Area: 584.07 km^{2} (225.51 sq mi)

Current constituency
- Created: 1907
- Representative: Maria Rachel Arenas
- Political party: Lakas
- Congressional bloc: Majority

Pangasinan's 3rd congressional district is one of the six congressional districts of the Philippines in the province of Pangasinan. It has been represented in the House of Representatives of the Philippines since 1916 and earlier in the Philippine Assembly from 1907 to 1916. The district consists of the city of San Carlos and adjacent municipalities of Bayambang, Calasiao, Malasiqui, Mapandan and Santa Barbara. It is currently represented in the 20th Congress by Maria Rachel Arenas of the Lakas–CMD.

== Representation history ==
#	Image	Member	Term of office		Legislature	Party	Electoral history	Constituent LGUs
#	Image	Member	Start	End	Legislature	Party	Electoral history	Constituent LGUs
=== Pangasinan's 3rd district for the Philippine Assembly ===
District created January 9, 1907.
1		Juan Alvear	October 16, 1907	October 16, 1909	1st	Nacionalista	Elected in 1907.	1907–1909; Alava, Bayambang, Calasiao, Malasiqui, Mangaldan, San Fabian, Santa Barbara
2		José T. Pecson	October 16, 1909	October 16, 1912	2nd	Nacionalista	Elected in 1909.	1909–1916; Alava, Bayambang, Calasiao, Malasiqui, Mangaldan, Mapandan, San Fabian, Santa Barbara
3		Rufo G. Cruz	October 16, 1912	October 16, 1916	3rd	Nacionalista	Elected in 1912.	1909–1916; Alava, Bayambang, Calasiao, Malasiqui, Mangaldan, Mapandan, San Fabian, Santa Barbara
=== Pangasinan's 3rd district for the House of Representatives of the Philippine Islands ===
4		Teodoro Y. Gómez	October 16, 1916	June 3, 1919	4th	Nacionalista	Elected in 1916.	1916–1919; Alava, Bayambang, Calasiao, Malasiqui, Mangaldan, Mapandan, San Fabian, Santa Barbara
5		Raymundo O. Camacho	June 3, 1919	June 2, 1925	5th	Nacionalista	Elected in 1919.	1919–1935; Bayambang, Calasiao, Malasiqui, Mangaldan, Mapandan, San Fabian, Santa Barbara, Sison
5		Raymundo O. Camacho	June 3, 1919	June 2, 1925	6th	Nacionalista; Unipersonalista	Re-elected in 1922.	1919–1935; Bayambang, Calasiao, Malasiqui, Mangaldan, Mapandan, San Fabian, Santa Barbara, Sison
6		Servillano de la Cruz	June 2, 1925	June 5, 1928	7th	Nacionalista; Consolidado	Elected in 1925.	1919–1935; Bayambang, Calasiao, Malasiqui, Mangaldan, Mapandan, San Fabian, Santa Barbara, Sison
(3)		Rufo G. Cruz	June 5, 1928	June 2, 1931	8th	Nacionalista; Consolidado	Elected in 1928.	1919–1935; Bayambang, Calasiao, Malasiqui, Mangaldan, Mapandan, San Fabian, Santa Barbara, Sison
7		Antonio C. Mejía	June 2, 1931	June 5, 1934	9th	Nacionalista; Consolidado	Elected in 1931.	1919–1935; Bayambang, Calasiao, Malasiqui, Mangaldan, Mapandan, San Fabian, Santa Barbara, Sison
8		Daniel Maramba	June 5, 1934	September 16, 1935	10th	Nacionalista; Democrático	Elected in 1934.	1919–1935; Bayambang, Calasiao, Malasiqui, Mangaldan, Mapandan, San Fabian, Santa Barbara, Sison
#	Image	Member	Term of office		National Assembly	Party	Electoral history	Constituent LGUs
#	Image	Member	Start	End	National Assembly	Party	Electoral history	Constituent LGUs
=== Pangasinan's 3rd district for the National Assembly (Commonwealth of the Philippines) ===
(8)		Daniel Maramba	September 16, 1935	December 28, 1941	1st	Nacionalista; Democrático	Re-elected in 1935.	1935–1941; Bayambang, Calasiao, Malasiqui, Mangaldan, Mapandan, San Fabian, San Jacinto, Santa Barbara
(8)		Daniel Maramba	September 16, 1935	December 28, 1941	2nd	Nacionalista	Re-elected in 1938. Died.	1935–1941; Bayambang, Calasiao, Malasiqui, Mangaldan, Mapandan, San Fabian, San Jacinto, Santa Barbara
District dissolved into the two-seat Pangasinan's at-large district for the National Assembly (Second Philippine Republic).
#	Image	Member	Term of office		Common wealth Congress	Party	Electoral history	Constituent LGUs
#	Image	Member	Start	End	Common wealth Congress	Party	Electoral history	Constituent LGUs
=== Pangasinan's 3rd district for the House of Representatives of the Commonwealth of the Philippines ===
District re-created May 24, 1945.
9		Pascual M. Beltrán	June 11, 1945	May 25, 1946	1st	Nacionalista	Elected in 1941.	1945–1946; Bayambang, Calasiao, Malasiqui, Mangaldan, Mapandan, San Fabian, San Jacinto, Santa Barbara
#	Image	Member	Term of office		Congress	Party	Electoral history	Constituent LGUs
#	Image	Member	Start	End	Congress	Party	Electoral history	Constituent LGUs
=== Pangasinan's 3rd district for the House of Representatives of the Philippines ===
(9)		Pascual M. Beltrán	May 25, 1946	December 30, 1949	1st	Liberal	Re-elected in 1946.	1946–1972; Bayambang, Calasiao, Malasiqui, Mangaldan, Mapandan, San Fabian, San Jacinto, Santa Barbara
10		José L. de Guzmán	December 30, 1949	December 30, 1953	2nd	Liberal	Elected in 1949.	1946–1972; Bayambang, Calasiao, Malasiqui, Mangaldan, Mapandan, San Fabian, San Jacinto, Santa Barbara
11		José D. Parayno	December 30, 1953	December 30, 1957	3rd	Liberal	Elected in 1953.	1946–1972; Bayambang, Calasiao, Malasiqui, Mangaldan, Mapandan, San Fabian, San Jacinto, Santa Barbara
12		Cipriano Primicias Jr.	December 30, 1957	June 24, 1960	4th	Nacionalista	Elected in 1957. Election annulled by House electoral tribunal after an electoral protest.	1946–1972; Bayambang, Calasiao, Malasiqui, Mangaldan, Mapandan, San Fabian, San Jacinto, Santa Barbara
(11)		José D. Parayno	June 24, 1960	December 30, 1961	4th	Liberal	Declared winner of 1957 elections.	1946–1972; Bayambang, Calasiao, Malasiqui, Mangaldan, Mapandan, San Fabian, San Jacinto, Santa Barbara
(12)		Cipriano Primicias Jr.	December 30, 1961	December 30, 1969	5th	Nacionalista	Elected in 1961.	1946–1972; Bayambang, Calasiao, Malasiqui, Mangaldan, Mapandan, San Fabian, San Jacinto, Santa Barbara
(12)		Cipriano Primicias Jr.	December 30, 1961	December 30, 1969	6th	Nacionalista	Re-elected in 1965.	1946–1972; Bayambang, Calasiao, Malasiqui, Mangaldan, Mapandan, San Fabian, San Jacinto, Santa Barbara
13		Corazon V. Primicias	December 30, 1969	January 24, 1972	7th	Nacionalista	Elected in 1969. Removed from office after an electoral protest.	1946–1972; Bayambang, Calasiao, Malasiqui, Mangaldan, Mapandan, San Fabian, San Jacinto, Santa Barbara
14		Fabian S. Sison	January 24, 1972	September 23, 1972	7th	Liberal	Declared winner of 1969 elections. Removed from office after imposition of martial law.	1946–1972; Bayambang, Calasiao, Malasiqui, Mangaldan, Mapandan, San Fabian, San Jacinto, Santa Barbara
District dissolved into the twelve-seat Region I's at-large district for the Interim Batasang Pambansa, followed by the six-seat Pangasinan's at-large district for the Regular Batasang Pambansa.
District re-created February 2, 1987.
(14)		Fabian S. Sison	June 30, 1987	June 30, 1992	8th	Lakas ng Bansa	Elected in 1987.	1987–present Bayambang, Calasiao, Malasiqui, Mapandan, San Carlos, Santa Barbara
15		Eric Galo P. Acuña	June 30, 1992	June 30, 1998	9th	NPC	Elected in 1992.	1987–present Bayambang, Calasiao, Malasiqui, Mapandan, San Carlos, Santa Barbara
15		Eric Galo P. Acuña	June 30, 1992	June 30, 1998	10th	Lakas	Re-elected in 1995.	1987–present Bayambang, Calasiao, Malasiqui, Mapandan, San Carlos, Santa Barbara
16		Generoso D. C. Tulagan	June 30, 1998	June 30, 2007	11th	NPC	Elected in 1998.	1987–present Bayambang, Calasiao, Malasiqui, Mapandan, San Carlos, Santa Barbara
16		Generoso D. C. Tulagan	June 30, 1998	June 30, 2007	12th	NPC	Re-elected in 2001.	1987–present Bayambang, Calasiao, Malasiqui, Mapandan, San Carlos, Santa Barbara
16		Generoso D. C. Tulagan	June 30, 1998	June 30, 2007	13th	NPC	Re-elected in 2004.	1987–present Bayambang, Calasiao, Malasiqui, Mapandan, San Carlos, Santa Barbara
17		Ma. Rachel J. Arenas	June 30, 2007	June 30, 2013	14th	Lakas	Elected in 2007.	1987–present Bayambang, Calasiao, Malasiqui, Mapandan, San Carlos, Santa Barbara
17		Ma. Rachel J. Arenas	June 30, 2007	June 30, 2013	15th	Liberal	Re-elected in 2010.	1987–present Bayambang, Calasiao, Malasiqui, Mapandan, San Carlos, Santa Barbara
18		Rosemarie Arenas	June 30, 2013	June 30, 2022	16th	Liberal	Elected in 2013.	1987–present Bayambang, Calasiao, Malasiqui, Mapandan, San Carlos, Santa Barbara
18		Rosemarie Arenas	June 30, 2013	June 30, 2022	17th	PDP–Laban	Re-elected in 2016.	1987–present Bayambang, Calasiao, Malasiqui, Mapandan, San Carlos, Santa Barbara
18		Rosemarie Arenas	June 30, 2013	June 30, 2022	18th	PDP–Laban	Re-elected in 2019.	1987–present Bayambang, Calasiao, Malasiqui, Mapandan, San Carlos, Santa Barbara
(17)		Ma. Rachel J. Arenas	June 30, 2022	Incumbent	19th	Lakas	Elected in 2022.	1987–present Bayambang, Calasiao, Malasiqui, Mapandan, San Carlos, Santa Barbara
(17)		Ma. Rachel J. Arenas	June 30, 2022	Incumbent	20th	Lakas	Re-elected in 2025.	1987–present Bayambang, Calasiao, Malasiqui, Mapandan, San Carlos, Santa Barbara

== Election results ==
=== 2025 ===
Candidate	Party	Votes	%
Maria Rachel Arenas (incumbent)	Lakas–CMD	328,672	91.69
Generoso Tulagan Sr.	Independent	24,573	6.85
George Absolor	Independent	5,228	1.46
Total		358,473	100.00
Valid votes		358,473	92.36
Invalid/blank votes		29,670	7.64
Total votes		388,143	100.00
Registered voters/turnout		454,801	85.34
Lakas–CMD hold			
Source: Commission on Elections

=== 2022 ===
2022 Philippine House of Representatives elections
Party	Candidate	Votes	%
PDP–Laban	Maria Rachel Arenas	311,862	90.47%
PPP	Generoso Mamaril	26,555	7.70%
PPM	Teodoro Cabral	6,302	1.83%
Total votes		344,719	100.00%
PDP–Laban hold			

=== 2019 ===
2019 Philippine House of Representatives elections
Party	Candidate	Votes	%
PDP–Laban	Rosemarie Arenas	242,465	83.67%
NUP	Felipe Devera	41,653	14.37%
Independent	Jaime Aquino	5,655	1.95%
Total votes		289,773	100.00
PDP–Laban hold			

=== 2016 ===
2016 Philippine House of Representatives elections
Party	Candidate	Votes	%
Liberal	Rosemarie Arenas	192,831	64.22%
KBL	Generoso Tulagan Sr.	53,844	17.93%
PDP–Laban	Eric Acuña	22,404	7.46%
Invalid or blank votes		31,183	10.39%
Total votes		300,262	100.00%
Liberal hold			

=== 2013 ===
2013 Philippine House of Representatives elections
Party	Candidate	Votes	%
Liberal	Rosemarie Arenas	201,340	73.96
Invalid or blank votes		70,856	26.04
Total votes		272,196	100.00
Liberal hold			

=== 2010 ===
2010 Philippine House of Representatives elections
Party	Candidate	Votes	%
Lakas–Kampi	Ma. Rachel Arenas	165,677	65.08
Liberal	Gallant Soriano	88,908	34.92
Valid ballots		254,585	96.27
Invalid or blank votes		9,876	3.73
Total votes		264,461	100.00
Lakas–Kampi hold			

== See also ==
- Legislative districts of Pangasinan
