= Maria Rachel Arenas =

Filipina businesswoman and politician

Maria Rachel J. Arenas
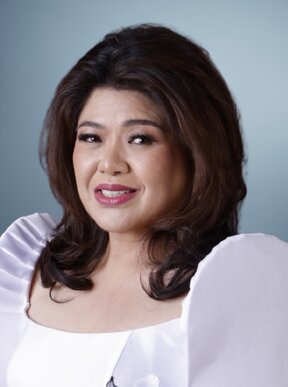
- Official portrait, 2026

Deputy Speaker of the House of Representatives of the Philippines
- Incumbent
- Assumed office March 18, 2026
- Speaker: Bojie Dy

Member of the Philippine House of Representatives from Pangasinan's 3rd district
- Incumbent
- Assumed office June 30, 2022
- Preceded by: Rosemarie Arenas
- In office June 30, 2007 – June 30, 2013
- Preceded by: Generoso Tulagan
- Succeeded by: Rosemarie Arenas

Chairperson of the Movie and Television Review and Classification Board
- In office January 20, 2017 – October 1, 2021
- Preceded by: Eugenio Villareal
- Succeeded by: Atty. Jeremiah P. Jaro

Personal details
- Born: November 15, 1971 (age 55) Makati, Rizal, Philippines
- Party: Lakas (2006–2010; 2022–present)
- Other political affiliations: PDP–Laban (2017–2022); Liberal (2010–2017)
- Relations: Jules Ledesma (first cousin); López family of Iloilo
- Parent(s): Rose Marie Arenas; Ramon Arenas
- Education: De La Salle University (AB)

Maria Rachel "Baby" Jimenez Arenas is a Filipina businesswoman and politician currently serving as the Deputy Speaker of the House of Representatives of the Philippines since 2026. She also serves as a member of the House of Representatives for Pangasinan's 3rd district since 2022, after serving two terms from 2007 to 2013. She previously served as chairperson of the Movie and Television Review and Classification Board (MTRCB) from 2017 to 2021. She was the first woman Representative of Pangasinan, followed subsequently by her mother, the noted Manila socialite and philanthropist Rose Marie J. Arenas. Her chairmanship of the board was confirmed by the Commission on Appointments on January 20, 2017. She also currently serves as a member of the Board of Governors of the Philippine Red Cross.

== Early life ==
Arenas was born Maria Rachel Jimenez Arenas in Makati to parents Rose Marie Arenas and Ramon Arenas, a Makati businessman with ties to the shipping industry. Her maternal grandparents were Alfredo Jimenez, an accountant at the Bureau of Internal Revenue (BIR); and Remedios Bosch, an opera singer and a music professor at the University of the East (UE). While her grandmother on her father's side was Doña Julieta Hofileña Lopez, of the affluent Lopez clan in Iloilo.

Prior to her election to Congress, she worked under two Presidential administrations; from 1992 to 1998 under President Fidel V. Ramos and from 1998 to 2001, with President Joseph Estrada (1998-2001). She also worked in the Media Affairs Bureau of the Office of the Vice President and the Department of Foreign Affairs, held concurrently by then, Teofisto Guingona, from 2001 to 2003. She also held various positions in other agencies, as Special Assistant to the General Manager of the National Development Company and the Business Development Manager of the National Maritime Equity Corporation.

=== Education ===
Arenas finished elementary and secondary education at Colegio San Agustin in Makati. She graduated from the De La Salle University with a degree in AB Political Science earning an Academic Excellence Award for Outstanding Thesis. She took up further studies at the Institute of Politics of the John F. Kennedy School of Government in Harvard University in 2003 and at Fletcher School of Law and Diplomacy at Tufts University in Boston, USA, in 2004.

== Political career ==
Arenas ran a successful campaign as a member of the House of Representatives. She was set to run unopposed in the 2013 elections but gave way to her mother now-Deputy Speaker Rose Marie Arenas. She was the first woman to be elected as Representative of the Third Congressional District of Pangasinan. While in office, she developed numerous infrastructure projects in the Third District, in particular the building of farm-to-market roads, bridges, school buildings and civic centers.

During her tenure, agriculture capacity increased after the installation of irrigation systems in 6,000 hectares of farmland. She was responsible for concretising and asphalting more than 30,000 kilometres of road; and the construction of five main bridges that connected different barangays and towns to each other: the San Vicente-Pogo Bridge in the municipality of Calasiao, Ican-Bugtong Bridge and Pamaranum Bridge in the Municipality of Malasiqui and San Vicente and Calvo Bridges in the Municipality of Bayambang. She also oversaw the rehabilitation of river banks, construction of proper drainage systems, and clearing waterways to alleviate the District's long-time flooding problem.

She was made the chairperson of the House Special Committee on Brunei-Indonesia-Malaysia-Philippines East ASEAN growth Area (BIMP-EAGA) and authored House Bill No. 4363, calling for the creation of the Southern Palawan Special Economic Zone and Freeport Authority to boost economic growth in the East Asean Region.

Arenas also authored and sponsored national bills that called for social justice, empowerment of the marginalized, and the improvement of basic services, such as health, education and livelihood. In line with combating corruption in President Benigno Aquino’s “Daang Matuwid” she authored HB 2471 seeking the protection, security and benefits of whistleblowers. In the 15th Congress, she would go on to oversee the establishment of a Provincial Information and Communications Technology Hubs (HB 4066), and the creation of a Department of Overseas Workers (HB 4408). She also authored the Service to Pay Act, the house resolution calling for the punishment of grain hoarders, the house bill calling for the creation of a Magna Carta of Agricultural Development Workers, and an act calling for the freezing of prices of basic commodities during calamities.

She was also honored as the Most Outstanding Congresswoman of 2007, during her first term in the House of Representatives.

Arenas was nominated as one of the Ten Outstanding Young Men and Women (TOYM) of 2011.

In 2013, she launched a project, the Education Leadership Training in partnership with the Foothill College of Silicon Valley which provided training and skills-building workshops in information and communication technology that would benefit more than 3,000 public school teachers, for which she was accorded by Foothill College, the honor of naming after her the said international program, R.A.C.E. or Rachel Arenas Collaborative for Excellence.

== Chairperson of the MTRCB ==
Arenas is the 15th and seventh woman chairperson of the Movie and Television Review and Classification Board (MTRCB) which is composed of 30 board members and a vice chairperson and is mandated to regulate and classify motion pictures, television programs, and publicity materials among others.

House of Representatives of the Philippines
Preceded by Rosemarie Arenas	Member of the House of Representatives from Pangasinan's 3rd district 2022–present	Incumbent
Preceded by Generoso Tulagan	Member of the House of Representatives from Pangasinan's 3rd district 2007–2013	Succeeded by Rosemarie Arenas
