= Cipriano Primicias Sr. =

Filipino politician

The Honorable Cipriano P. Primicias Sr.
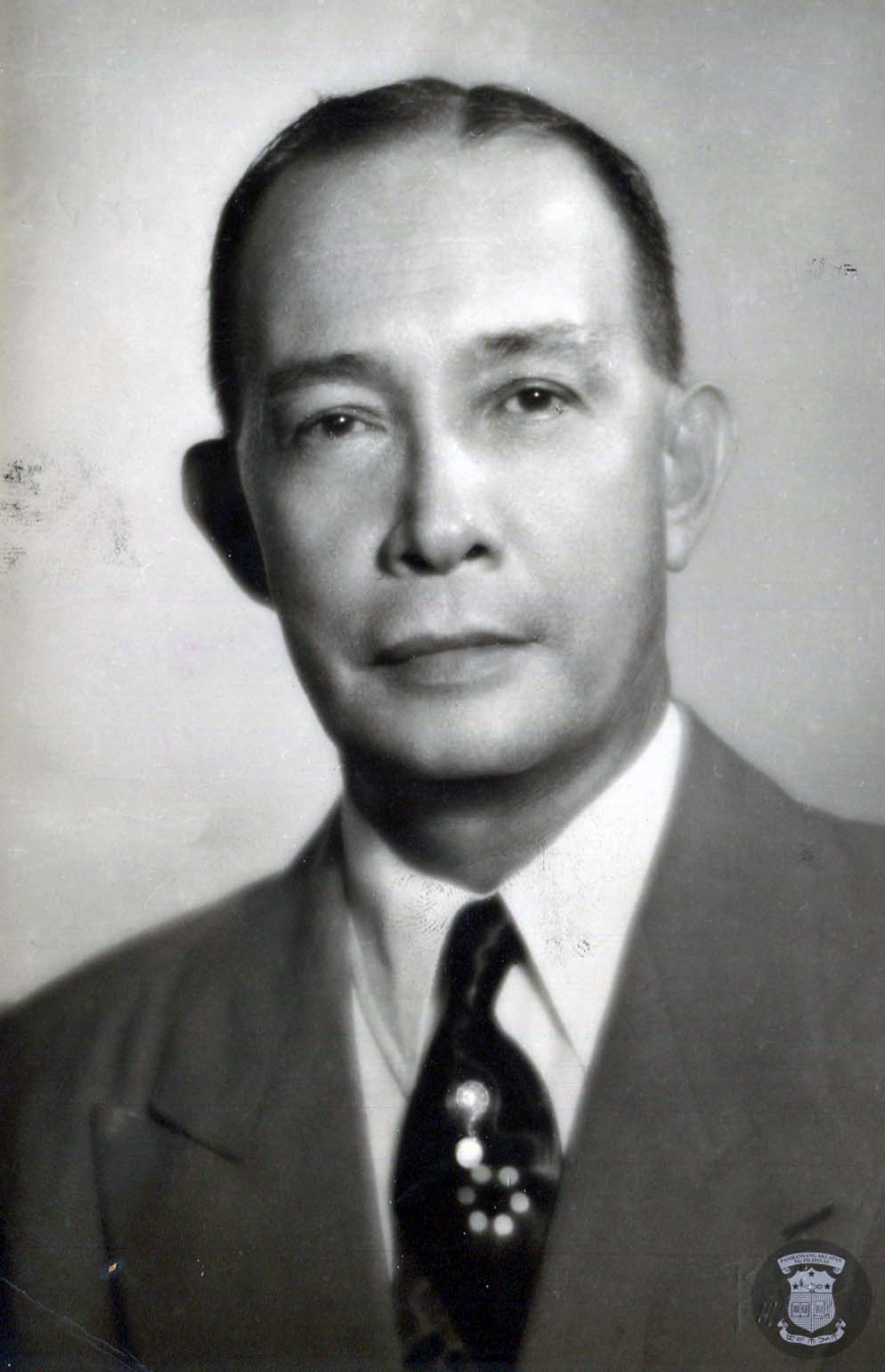

Senator of the Philippines
- In office December 30, 1951 – December 30, 1963

Senate Majority Leader
- In office January 25, 1954 – January 22, 1962
- Preceded by: Tomas Cabili
- Succeeded by: Arturo Tolentino

Member of the House of Representatives of the Philippines from Pangasinan's 4th district
- In office 1934–1935
- Preceded by: Eusebio V. Sison
- Succeeded by: Nicomedes T. Rupisan
- In office December 30, 1941 (Note: Term cut short when the Japanese invaded the Philippines between late 1941 and early 1942.) – December 30, 1949
- Preceded by: Nicomedes T. Rupisan
- Succeeded by: Amadeo J. Perez

Personal details
- Born: Cipriano Purugganan Primicias Sr. September 14, 1901 Alcala, Pangasinan, Philippine Islands
- Died: September 25, 1965 (aged 64) Quezon City, Philippines
- Party: Nacionalista (1934–1965)
- Spouse: Nieves Ocampo Benito (m. 1930)
- Children: 9, including Cipriano Jr.

Cipriano Purugganan Primicias Sr. (September 14, 1901 – September 20, 1965) was a Filipino politician, who was best known for his service as a Senator of the Philippines.

== Early life and education ==
Primicias was born in September 14, 1901 at Alcala, in the northern Philippine province of Pangasinan to Javier Crescini Primicias and Cristeta Purugganan. He completed his elementary education with highest honors, his high school courses with second-highest honors and passed the government first grade civil service tests when he was still in high school in 1919. He enrolled in the National Law College and at the same time worked as a clerk in the Bureau of Commerce in 1919 where he rose to the rank of Chief, Commercial Section. He finished his Bachelor of Laws degree in 1923 with highest honors and passed the bar examinations in the top five that same year.

=== Legal career ===
In 1924, he quit his post at the Bureau of Commerce and began his law practice as an assistant attorney in the law office of then-Senator Alejo R. Mabanag. By 1936 he was the President of the Pangasinan Bar Association, a post he held till 1945.

== Political career ==
=== House of Representatives ===
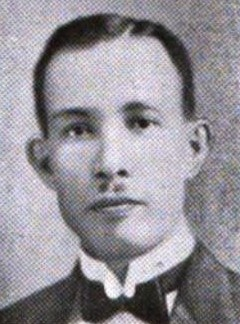
Primicias as member of the Philippine House of Representatives, published by Benipayo Press c. 1935

A ranking member of the Nacionalista Party (NP), Primicias entered politics in 1934 when he was elected to the Philippine House of Representatives from the fourth district of Pangasinan. He represented his district for three consecutive terms beginning in 1934, 1941 and 1946. Being in the then-minority party at the time, Primicias was an oppositionist and fiscalizer in the House of Representatives.

==== Bell Trade Act of 1946 ====
The old Philippine Senate, 1951: Senator Primicias at extreme left, debates Senator Quintín Paredes at extreme right. In the middle are Senators Justiniano Montano, Mariano Jesús Cuenco, Enrique B. Magalona, and Francisco Delgado. In the foreground is Senator Edmundo B. Cea.

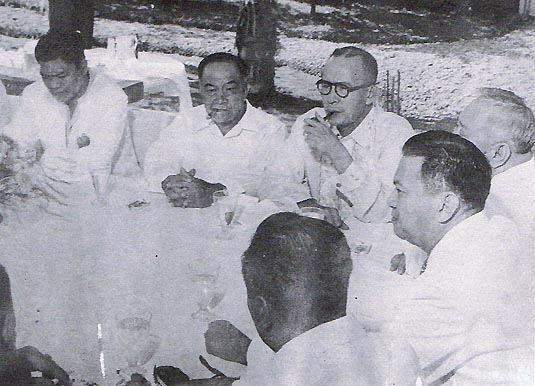
At Malacañang Palace, 1955. Clockwise, from top left: Senator Edmundo B. Cea, Former President José P. Laurel Sr., Senator Primicias, Senate President Eulogio A. Rodriguez Sr., President Ramon F. Magsaysay, & House Speaker José B. Laurel Jr.

On the campaign trail, 1957: During a lull in both their reelection campaigns, Senator Primicias shares a light moment with his partymate and close friend, Senator Jose Locsin, to whom he conceded the last seat in the Senate though he was leading in the still-ongoing count. Primicias eventually won the seat.

During his last term in the House, Primicias was one of nine Congressmen and three senators who opposed the ratification of the United States' Bell Trade Act of 1946 (also called the Philippine Trade Act of 1946) mostly because it required amending the Philippine Constitution to give American citizens and corporations equal access with Filipinos to the Philippines' natural resources. In addition the law also gave U.S. citizens the right to import goods without paying import duties and fixed the value of the Philippine peso to the U.S. dollar. Primicias and other opponents of the Bell Trade Act considered the measure an inexcusable surrender of Philippine sovereignty.

Because ratification of the Bell Trade Act required a two-thirds vote of the House and the Senate, Primicias - with the eight other Congressmen and the three senators - were unseated from the Philippine Congress on spurious charges while the ratification process was underway in order to ensure its passage. Upon appeal to the Philippine Supreme Court all twelve legislators were reinstated, but by that time their temporary ejection had served its purpose and the Bell Trade Act had already been ratified.

During his last term in the House (1946–1949), Primicias served as the Minority Floor Leader. From 1946 till 1964 he was the Nacionalista Party Vice-President.

=== Senate ===
In the 1951 Philippine midterm elections, Primicias was elected in an 8-0 shut-out by the Nacionalista Party to his first term as a Senator.

While in the Philippine Senate he became chairman of the following Committees: Finance (1952–1953), Labor (1952–1953), Public Works (1953), Justice (1958–1960), Appointments (1958–1960) and the powerful Committee on Rules (1953–1963) as well as a member of the Senate Electoral Tribunal (1954–1963).

He was reelected to the Senate for a second term in 1957. From 1953 till 1963 Senator Primicias was the Senate Majority Floor Leader.

"I have said that Senator Primicias has outstanding achievements. There is no doubt whatsoever as to his capacity to hold the highest position in the land within the reach or within the gift of the Filipino people."

— Carlos P. Garcia, then-Philippine President

"To the Majority Floor Leader, the "Parliamentarian par excellence" goes the plaudit not only of the Presiding Officer and of all the Members of the Senate but all those who have watched the deliberations of this chamber."

— Ferdinand E. Marcos, then-Senate President, and later Philippine President

"The Free Press believes that Floor leader Cipriano P. Primicias rates special mention as the Fiscalizer of The Year. There is little doubt that he towers head and shoulders above the opposition crowd in the fight to preserve the independence of Congress and the two-party system."

— Philippines Free Press Magazine, 1962

== Other positions ==
- Four-time Vice-President, World Inter-Parliamentary Union Conference: 1954 (Vienna), 1956 (Bangkok), 1958 (Rio de Janeiro), and 1960 (Tokyo).
- Member, Council of State, 1953 to 1963.

Senator Primicias was also the former Dean of the College of Law in Orient College, President of the Pindangan Agricultural Company and the Lingayen Gulf Fishing Company and was a member of the Knights of Columbus.

== Personal life ==
In 1930, Primicias married Miss Pangasinan Nieves Ocampo Benito, with whom he had nine children: Cipriano Jr. (Tito) – himself a former Congressman and Governor of Pangasinan; Ma. Corazon (Marietta); Ricardo; Juan Augusto; Ramon; Edmundo; Carlos; Perla; and Baby Nieves.

An ardent Hispanist, Primicias spoke fluent Spanish and regularly debated on the Senate floor in that language. He also spoke English, Filipino, Ilocano, and Pangansinense with equal facility.

He died a week after his 64th birthday in Quezon City, Philippines, on September 20, 1965.

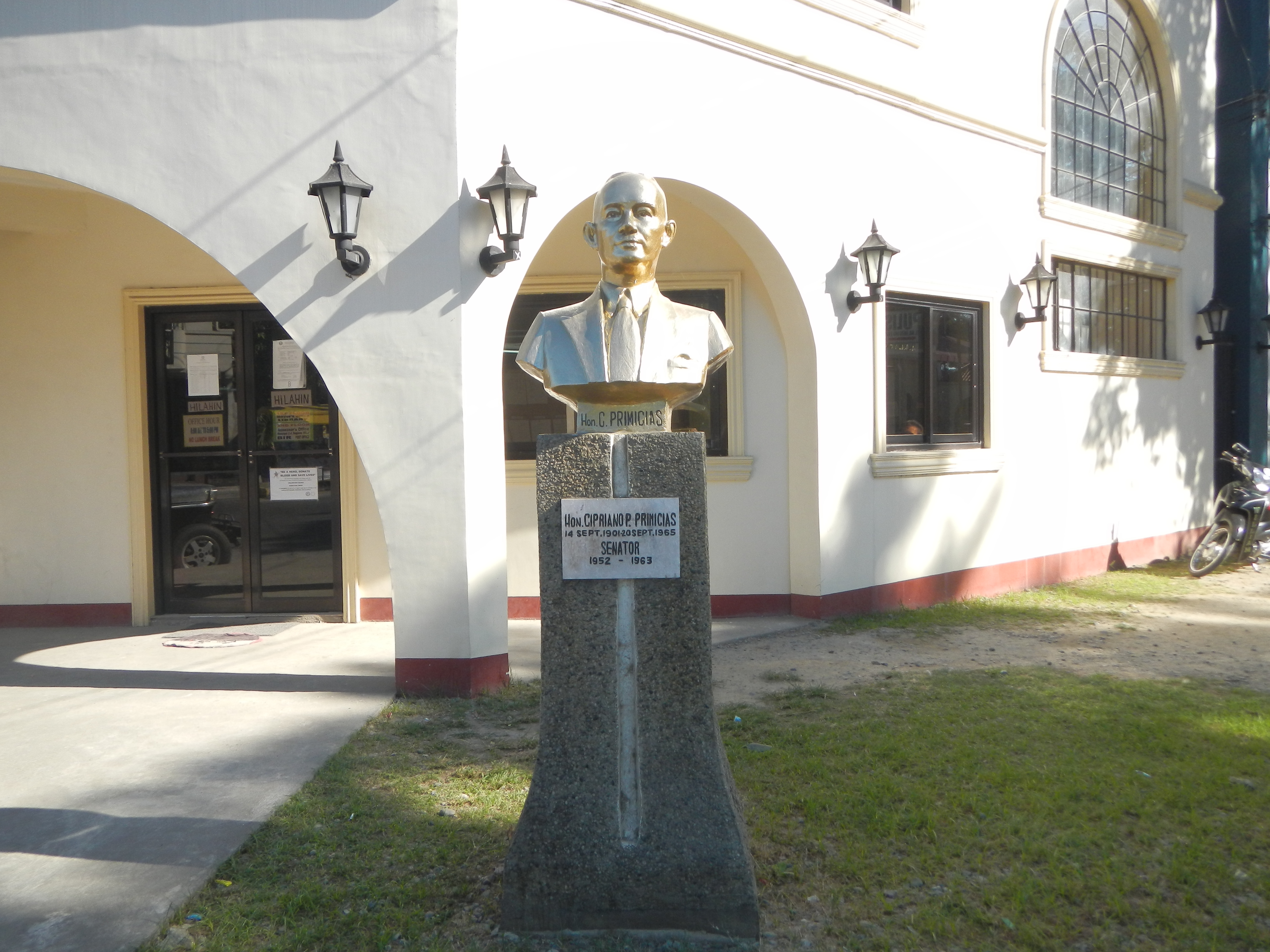
Primicias Sr.'s bust-Monument, Alcala, Pangasinan.

== Footnotes ==
House of Representatives of the Philippines
Preceded by Eusebio V. Sison	Representative, 4th District of Pangasinan; 1934–1935	Succeeded by Nicomedes T. Rupisan
Preceded by Nicomedes T. Rupisan	Representative, 4th District of Pangasinan; 1941–1949	Succeeded by Amadeo J. Perez
Political offices
Preceded by Tomás L. Cabili	Senate Majority Floor Leader; 1953–1963	Succeeded by José J. Roy
