= Prime Minister of the Philippines =

Head of government of the Philippines from 1978 to 1986

- Punong Ministro ng Pilipinas
- Prime ministerial seal (1981–1986)

- Prime ministerial standard (1981–1986)

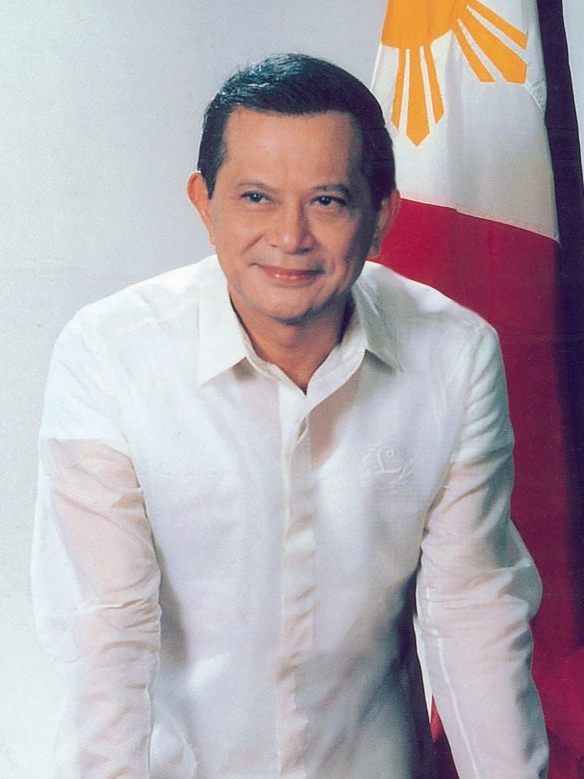
- Last officeholder Salvador Laurel; February 25, 1986 – March 25, 1986
- Government of the Philippines (formerly)
- Style: Prime Minister (informal); The Honorable (formal); His Excellency (formal, diplomatic)
- Type: Head of government (abolished); Commander-in-chief (abolished)
- Member of: Cabinet
- Residence: Executive House
- Seat: Manila
- Nominator: President of the Philippines
- Appointer: The president (1899) Batasang Pambansa; with members' advice and consent (1978–1986)
- Precursor: Office established (pre-1899); President of the Philippines (1978)
- Formation: January 2, 1899 (first creation); June 12, 1978 (second creation)
- First holder: Apolinario Mabini (first creation); Ferdinand Marcos (second creation)
- Final holder: Pedro Paterno (first abolition); Salvador Laurel (second abolition)
- Abolished: November 13, 1899 (first abolition); March 25, 1986 (second abolition)
- Superseded by: President of the Philippines (1899–1978; 1986–present)
- Succession: Deputy Prime Minister (1978–1986)

The prime minister of the Philippines (Filipino: Punong ministro ng Pilipinas) was the official designation of the head of government (whereas the president of the Philippines was the head of state) of the Philippines from 1978 until the People Power Revolution in 1986. During martial law and the Fourth Republic, the prime minister served as the head of the Armed Forces of the Philippines. A limited version of this office, officially known as the president of the Council of Government, existed temporarily in 1899 during the First Philippine Republic.

Salvador Laurel concurrently served as the last prime minister and the first post-martial law vice president of the Philippines from February 25 to March 25, 1986, after which he continued to serve solely as vice president until 1992.

== History ==
=== First creation (1899) ===
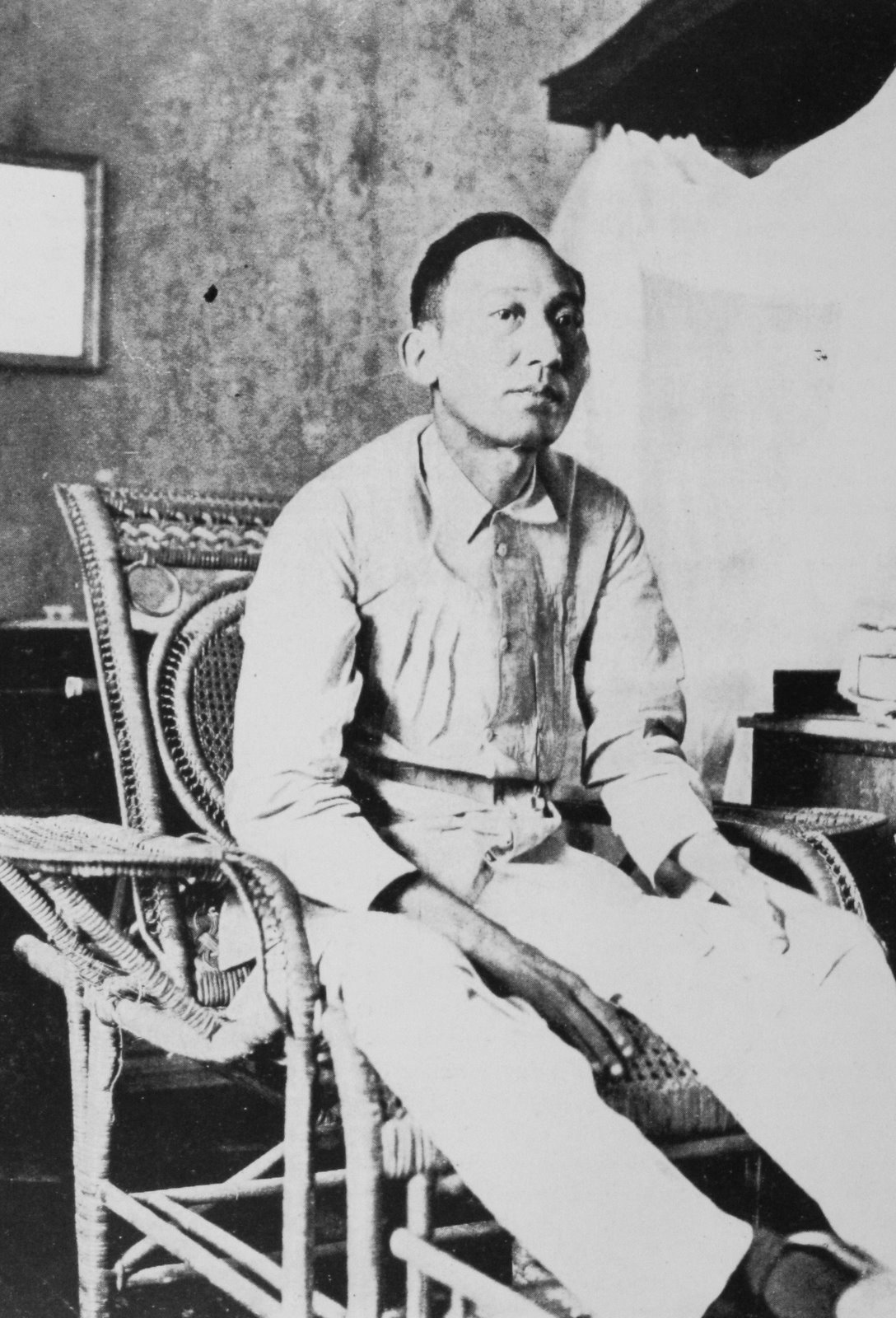
Apolinario Mabini, first president of the Council of Government, relative equivalent of the office of prime minister.

The 1899 Constitution of the Philippines created the office of the Council of Government (Spanish: Consejo de Gobierno) which was composed of seven secretaries with one president of the Council (Spanish: presidente del Consejo de Gobierno). The president of the revolutionary government led by Emilio Aguinaldo, appointed his advisor and Secretary of Foreign Affairs Apolinario Mabini as the first president of the Council of Government through a decree issued January 2, 1899. Mabini also became the foreign minister of the republic. The president of the Council was de facto equivalent to a prime minister.

On December 10, 1898, the ongoing war between United States and Spain was concluded with Spain giving up all rights to Cuba and surrendering the Philippines, Guam and Puerto Rico to the United States. Two days later, Aguinaldo ordered his lawyer Felipe Agoncillo to contest the Philippine status as an independent nation and no longer a Spanish colony since the declaration of independence on June 12, 1898. The United States did not recognize Philippine sovereignty. This led to serious conflict with the Philippine Republic established on January 23, 1899 at Malolos. By January 30, Aguinaldo had again dispatched Agoncillo, this time to the United States Senate, to lobby them to reconsider their plans and instead formally recognize Filipino independence.

In the next few months, Mabini was pressured by political problems such as negotiating to end the hostilities between Filipinos and American forces left in the Philippines after the war. After the failure to reach successful agreements with the U.S. army to secure a cease fire, the first shot of the Philippine–American War erupted on February 4, 1899. The government was forced to vacate Malolos and transfer the seat of administration from place to place. Mabini, who was pressured then from his political adversaries and failure to achieve peace, resigned on May 7, 1899.

One of the political adversaries who pressured Mabini into leaving office was Pedro Paterno, president of the Congress of the Republic since September 15, 1898. He opposed Mabini's offensive plan to counter United States attacks during the war, so he proposed peace plans with the Americans to Aguinaldo, such that the Philippines would be a protectorate of the United States with full autonomy. This was opposed by Mabini. The tension led Aguinaldo to consider dissolving the Mabini cabinet, which Mabini agreed to.

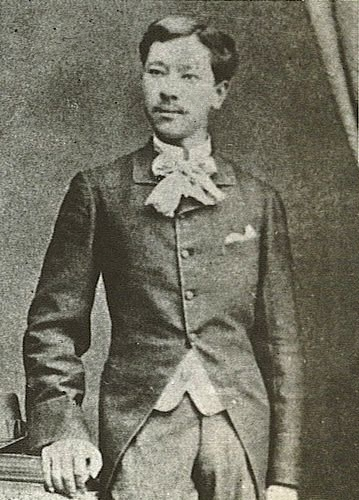
Pedro Paterno succeeded Mabini in May 1899. His actions led to the declaration of war against the United States the next month.

The next day, May 8, Aguinaldo appointed Paterno as the president of the Council of Government. One of his first moves during his term was to draft a copy of "Autonomy Plan" to the Schurman Commission which asks for peace settlement with the U.S. government. This also states that the Filipinos are ready to drop the idea of independence and accept U.S. sovereignty over the archipelago.

Meanwhile, the takeover by Paterno of the revolutionary government and his actions towards the Schurman Commission infuriated General Antonio Luna, the commanding officer of the Philippine Army. He ordered he arrest Paterno and other members of the Cabinet, but this was not carried out. Due to his actions, Paterno was forced to write a manifesto on June 2, 1899, stating a formal declaration of war against the United States. On June 5, Luna was assassinated in Nueva Ecija, one of the alleged reasons for his murder was due to this conflict with Paterno.

During the war, the seat of Aguinaldo changed from place to place northwards as the Americans grew aggressive. On November 13, 1899, Paterno was captured by U.S. forces in Benguet, thus ending his term as the president of the Council. Aguinaldo, however, did not appoint a successor for Paterno in the exigency of the situation. On June 21, 1900, Paterno, as prisoner of war, accepted amnesty granted by the military governor General Arthur MacArthur Jr. and he finally swore allegiance to the United States together with other members of Aguinaldo's government.

From 1899 to 1901, American executive authority in the Philippines was exercised by military governors. When Aguinaldo was captured by Gen. Frederick Funston on March 23, 1901 at Palanan, Isabela, the country was headed then by civil governors until the formal establishment of self-autonomous Commonwealth on November 15, 1935. The 1935 Constitution that describes the operation of the Commonwealth does not have the provision of reviving the office of the president of the Council of the Government or creating any related position. This was continued until the Third Republic.

=== Second creation (1978–1986) ===
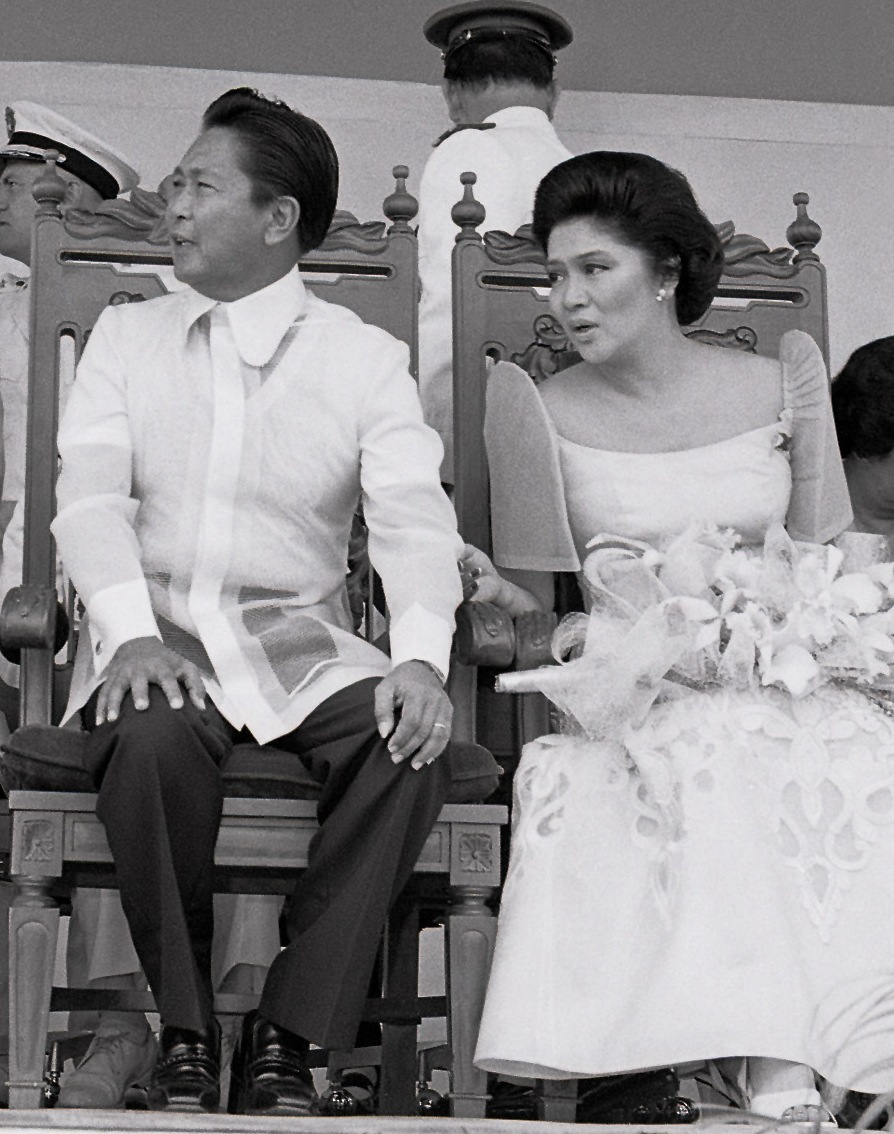
Prime Minister Ferdinand Marcos and First Lady Imelda Marcos in 1979.

In 1976, President Ferdinand Marcos issued Presidential Decrees 991 and 1033 calling for a constitutional referendum, set on October 16, 1976. The voters were asked whether they wanted to lift the ongoing martial law since 1972; the majority approved its continuation. In addition, drafted and ratified was the Sixth Amendment to the 1973 Constitution, which fused legislative and executive powers in the office of the president. One of its provisions at the time of ratification was that the president shall obtain the title of Prime Minister, thus re-creating the office after 1899. Marcos, who concurrently as president, continued to wield the powers vested in the president by the 1935 Constitution. The amendment also created the unicameral legislature known as the Interim Batasang Pambansa (Interim National Assembly or IBP), as well as a provision such that the president–prime minister will exercise legislative powers until martial law is lifted.

On April 7, 1978, the first election for the Batasang Pambansa, was held since the abolition of the bicameral Congress under the 1973 Constitution. 150 out of 165 elected positions of the parliament were dominated by Marcos' ruling party, the Kilusang Bagong Lipunan (New Society Movement). By June 12, the IBP was inaugurated which also confirmed Marcos' position as the prime minister of the Philippines.

Upon his inauguration for a third presidential term on June 30, 1981, Marcos formally relinquished his powers as prime minister. He appointed then-finance minister Cesar Virata to succeed him to the post during the opening of the fourth regular session of the IBP on July 27, 1981. Virata, a grand-nephew of former President Emilio Aguinaldo, previously represented the country to World Bank's Council of Governors. Until the 1986 People Power Revolution, Virata held this position. It was conjectured that Marcos bestowed his prime ministerial post to Virata because of the latter's distance from mainstream politics. Other than being Marcos' finance minister, Virata was not a political threat.

=== Abolition ===
Upon her accession in late February 1986, Corazon Aquino appointed her vice president and running mate Salvador Laurel to succeed Virata under her revolutionary government. However, the premiership was later abolished in March 1986 with the release of Proclamation No. 3, or the "Freedom Constitution".

The subsequent and currently-enforced 1987 Constitution has no provisions for such a position, as the president is now both head of government and head of state.

== Powers and duties ==
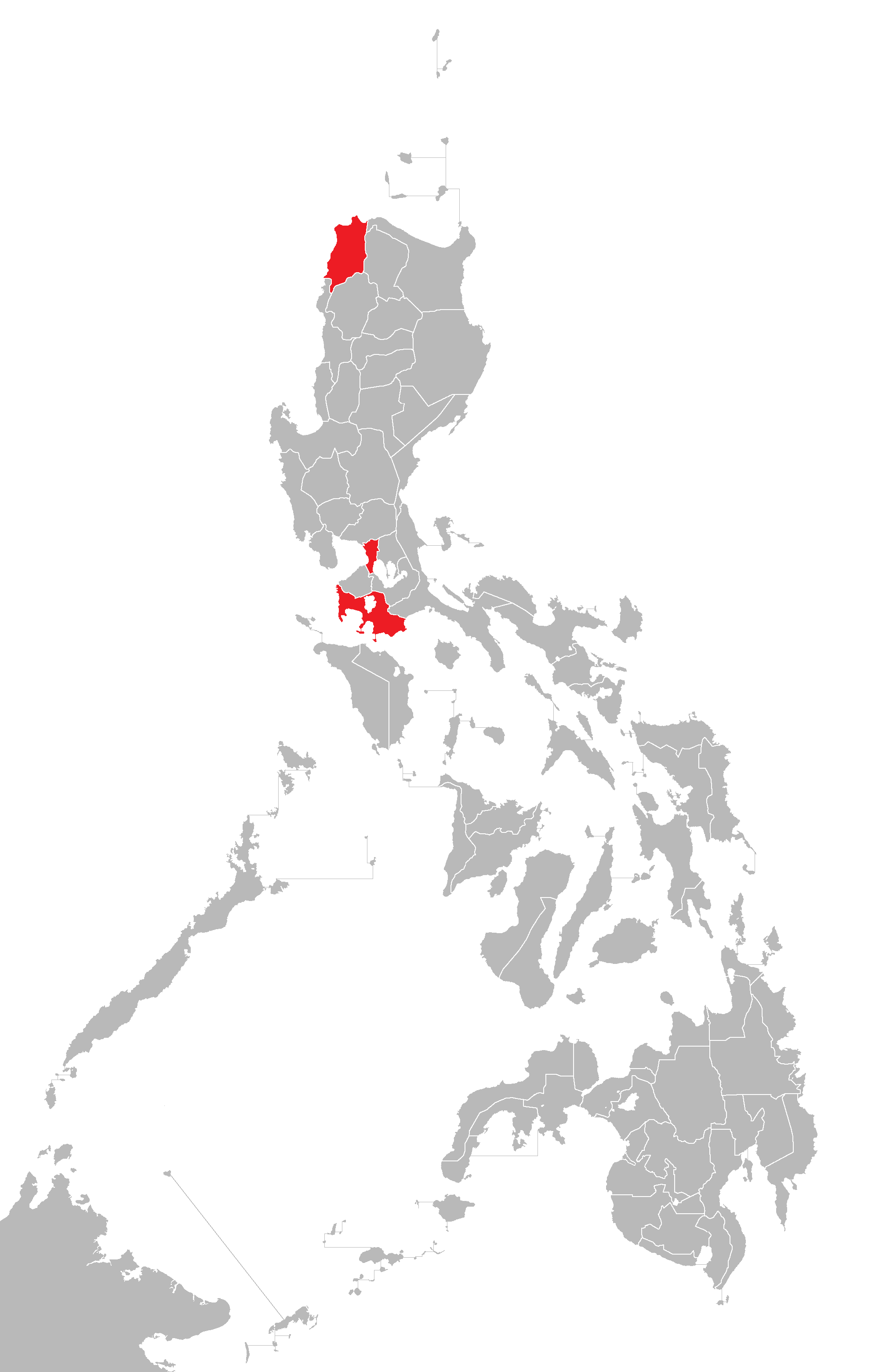
Map of the Philippines highlighting the birthplace of prime ministers.

The office of the president of the Council of Government was created by 1899 Constitution of the Philippines in Title IX, with the role as the head of secretaries to the president of the Republic. The president of the Council was not the head of government, as the constitution vested the executive power in the President of the Republic. The role of the president of the Council was defined in the decree of January 2, 1899, establishing the first Council with Mabini, concurrently Secretary of Foreign Affairs, as its president. The president of the Council was charged with "convoking and executing the counsel of the same; inspecting the Secretaries, so that they maintain orderliness; and manage correspondence with the Congress, Supreme Court of Justice and representatives of foreign Governments".

The 1973 Constitution provided clear powers and duties of the prime minister starting at the administration of Ferdinand Marcos. Article IX, Section 3 of the 1973 Constitution describes the primary qualification of an individual to become the prime minister: he must be a member of the Interim Batasang Pambansa. To become a member of the Interim Batasang Pambansa, one must be a qualified citizen of the republic and was elected by the popular district in which he will represent at the assembly. Though the appointment of the prime minister is exactly written on the constitution, however, the prime minister is exempted from impeachment, thus paving way for whoever the prime minister will be, for an indefinite term. On the same hand, the prime minister and his deputy may leave office at their own will. However, the same as in other parliaments, the Batasang Pambansa may withdraw its confidence from the prime minister only by electing a successor by a majority vote of all its members.

Apart being the head of government, the prime minister also presides over his Cabinet. He has the power to appoint Cabinet members, often from the National Assembly. Likewise, he also has the prerogative to remove them at his discretion.

He also has the following powers and duties:

- Appoint the deputy prime minister that will have powers vested by the prime minister;
- Present the program and state of the government to the National Assembly at the start of each regular session;
- Control all ministries provided by the law;
- Head the Armed Forces of the Philippines as their commander-in-chief;
- Appoint the heads of government bureaus and offices, and promote brigadier-generals and commodores of the Armed Forces;
- Grant reprieves, commutations, and pardons; remit fines and forfeitures after final conviction; and grant amnesties with the permission of the National Assembly, except at the time of impeachment; and
- Guarantee foreign and local loans of the Republic.

In Section 16, it was also mentioned that all powers previously vested by the 1935 Constitution of the Philippines to the president of the republic shall be transferred to the prime minister unless the National Assembly provides those. This includes the power of the prime minister to sign and create treaties and foreign agreements as well as appointment of ambassadors and consuls with the permission of the Commission on Appointments.

However, upon the amendments to the 1973 Constitution in 1981, which created a so-called modified parliamentary form of government, which has some sorts of semi-presidentialism, to be patterned after that in Peru, most of the executive powers held by the prime minister were restored to the president, who would be directly elected by the people and has complete control over the ministries as chief executive, the one that would determine the national and foreign policies of the country and who commands the armed forces. The president retains the right to issue decrees with the force of law at any time pursuant to Amendment No. 6 to the said Constitution, ratified in 1976. The prime minister was still retained as the head of the Cabinet, but his power was relegated to supervising the ministries. The prime minister will be elected by the majority of all the members of the Batasang Pambansa, upon nomination of the president. The prime minister is responsible, alongside the Cabinet, before the Batasang Pambansa for a program of government that has to be approved first by the president.

Under Executive Order No. 708 issued on July 27, 1981, the powers of the prime minister were expanded, especially in relation to supervising such ministries. The prime minister was mandated to take charge and management of the day-to-day and details of administration of the government, to coordinate the activities of the ministries and to act on all matters delegated by the president without indicating the sentence, "By the Authority of the President." In 1984, the prime minister was also mandated to head a Cabinet Standing Committee created to assist the president in his functions, whenever he may prescribe and as chairman of the committee, he was made as its executive officer to carry out its decisions and actions.

The defunct 1973 Constitution provides the following oath or affirmation for the president and vice president-elect which must be taken before they enter into office:

"I, (name), do solemnly swear [or affirm], that I will faithfully and conscientiously fulfill my duties as Prime Minister [or Deputy Prime Minister] of the Philippines. Preserve and defend its Constitution, execute its laws, do justice to every man, and consecrate myself to the service of the Nation. So help me God." [In case of affirmation, last sentence will be omitted.]

— 1973 Constitution of the Philippines, art. 9, sec. 6

== Insignia ==
The prime minister's official seal, used in ministerial reports and displayed in the office, features a white equilateral triangle with stylized Baybayin characters (possibly denoting the initial syllables of the title in Filipino: Punong Ministro; the Baybayin letters in surviving photographic evidence show "pi" and "mi" characters instead of "pu", however), surrounded by radiating rays and three white five-pointed stars, all within a blue circle. This is enclosed by a white ring bearing the words SEAL OF THE PRIME MINISTER at the top and PHILIPPINES at the bottom, all within a Philippine sun colored blue, set inside a yellow circle. The prime minister's flag consists of the seal in a yellow field.

== Office ==
The offices of the prime minister were located at the Executive House (previously known as the Legislative Building before the abolition of the bicameral Congress in 1972, now the National Museum of Fine Arts).

== List of prime ministers ==
No.	Portrait	Name Constituency (Lifespan)	Term start	Term end	Term length	Party	Election	President
1		Apolinario Mabini (1864–1903)	January 23, 1899	May 7, 1899	114 days	Nonpartisan	— (Note: Appointed by the president.)	Emilio Aguinaldo
2		Pedro Paterno; Delegate from Ilocos Norte (1857–1911)	May 8, 1899	November 13, 1899	189 days	Nonpartisan	—	Emilio Aguinaldo
Vacant (Note: The office of prime minister was vacant from Pedro Paterno's resignation on November 14, 1899, until the First Philippine Republic's dissolution on April 1, 1901.) (November 13, 1899 – April 19, 1901)								Emilio Aguinaldo
Position abolished (April 19, 1901 – January 17, 1973)
Vacant (Note: The 1973 Constitution provided for a prime minister. The constitution was amended in 1976 for the president of the Philippines to become prime minister. However, the position remained vacant until Ferdinand Marcos assumed office as prime minister on July 12, 1978.) (January 17, 1973 – June 12, 1978)								Ferdinand Marcos
3		Ferdinand Marcos (1917–1989)	June 12, 1978	June 30, 1981	3 years, 18 days	KBL	1978	Ferdinand Marcos
4		Cesar Virata; MP from the Cabinet (until 1984) and Cavite (from 1984) (1930–2026)	July 28, 1981	February 25, 1986	4 years, 212 days	KBL	—	Ferdinand Marcos
4		Cesar Virata; MP from the Cabinet (until 1984) and Cavite (from 1984) (1930–2026)	July 28, 1981	February 25, 1986	4 years, 212 days	KBL	1984	Ferdinand Marcos
5		Salvador Laurel (1928–2004)	February 25, 1986	March 25, 1986	28 days	UNIDO	—	Corazon Aquino
Position abolished (since March 25, 1986)

== Deputy Prime Minister of the Philippines ==
Deputy Prime Minister of the Philippines
- Depyuti Punong Ministro ng Pilipinas
- Coat of arms of the Philippines (1985–1986)

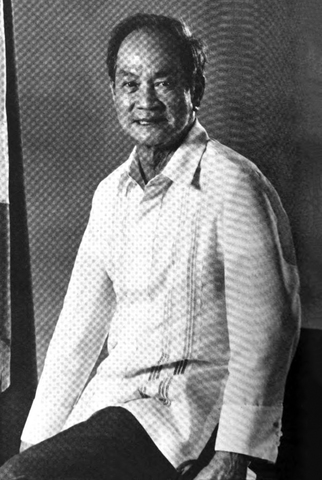
- Last officeholder Jose Roño; July 28, 1981 – March 25, 1986
- Government of the Philippines (formerly)
- Style: Deputy Prime Minister (informal); The Honorable (formal); His Excellency (formal, diplomatic)
- Member of: Cabinet
- Nominator: President of the Philippines
- Appointer: Batasang Pambansa
- Precursor: Office established
- Formation: January 17, 1973
- First holder: Cesar Virata
- Final holder: Jose Roño
- Abolished: March 25, 1986

The deputy prime minister of the Philippines was the deputy head of government and the second highest-ranking member of the Cabinet of the Philippines from 1978 until 1986.

The deputy prime minister was mandated to perform functions assigned by the prime minister or to discharge the latter’s duties during periods of absence. During question hours in the Batasan, the deputy prime minister could stand in for the prime minister to answer legislative queries and engage in interpellations.

Following the 1981 amendments to the 1973 Constitution, the president was given the power to nominate a deputy prime minister from among the members of the Batasan, subject to election by a majority of its members. Prior to this, an amendment to the original charter in 1976 allowed the president to nominate as many deputy prime ministers as he deemed necessary.

There were only two officeholders throughout the existence of the position before its abolition, along with the prime ministerial post.

Cesar Virata concurrently served as President Marcos’ deputy prime minister and finance minister from 1978 to 1981. He is the only deputy prime minister to have later been appointed prime minister.

The last deputy prime minister was Jose Roño, in office from 1981 to 1986, who also served as the minister of local government and leader of the majority in the Regular Batasang Pambansa until all positions attached to the premiership were abolished in 1986 following the promulgation of the Freedom Constitution.

=== List of deputy prime ministers ===
No.	Portrait	Name Constituency (Lifespan)	Term start	Term end	Term length	Party	Election	Prime Minister
1		Cesar Virata; MP from the Cabinet (1930–2026)	June 12, 1978	June 30, 1981	3 years, 18 days	KBL	1978	Ferdinand Marcos
2		Jose Roño; MP from Region VIII (until 1984) and Samar (from 1984) (1923–2002)	July 28, 1981	March 25, 1986	4 years, 247 days	KBL	— (Note: Appointed)	Cesar Virata
2		Jose Roño; MP from Region VIII (until 1984) and Samar (from 1984) (1923–2002)	July 28, 1981	March 25, 1986	4 years, 247 days	KBL	1984	Cesar Virata
2		Jose Roño; MP from Region VIII (until 1984) and Samar (from 1984) (1923–2002)	July 28, 1981	March 25, 1986	4 years, 247 days	KBL	1984	Salvador Laurel
Position abolished (since March 25, 1986)

== Statistics ==
- List of prime ministers by age at the start of term:

1. Ferdinand Marcos — 60 years, 274 days
2. Salvador Laurel — 57 years, 99 days
3. Cesar Virata — 50 years, 200 days
4. Pedro Paterno — 41 years, 69 days
5. Apolinario Mabini — 34 years, 163 days

- List of prime ministers by tenure of office:

1. Cesar Virata (1981–1986) — 4 years, 240 days
2. Ferdinand Marcos (1978–1981) — 3 years, 18 days
3. Apolinario Mabini (1899) — 184 days
4. Pedro Paterno (1899) — 131 days
5. Salvador Laurel (1986) — 28 days

== See also ==
- List of sovereign state leaders in the Philippines
- Vice President of the Philippines

== Notes ==
Preceded by Governor-General of the Spanish East Indies	Head of government of the Philippines; 1899	Succeeded by President of the Philippines
Preceded by President of the Philippines	Head of government of the Philippines; 1978–1986	President of the Philippines
