= 7th Congress of the Philippines =

24th legislative term of the Philippines

←	6th	Interim Batasang Pambansa	→
- Old Legislative Building (c. 1988)

Overview
- Term: January 26, 1970 – January 17, 1973
- President: Ferdinand Marcos
- Vice President: Fernando Lopez

Senate
- Members: 24
- President: Gil Puyat
- President pro tempore: Jose Roy
- Majority leader: Arturo Tolentino
- Minority leader: Gerardo Roxas

House of Representatives
- Members: 110
- Speaker: Jose Laurel Jr. (until April 1, 1971); Cornelio Villareal (from April 1, 1971)
- Speaker pro tempore: Jose Aldeguer
- Majority leader: Marcelino Veloso
- Minority leader: Justiniano Montano (until June 12, 1971); Ramon Mitra Jr. (June 12 – December 30, 1971); Ramon Felipe Jr. (from January 24, 1972)

The 7th Congress of the Philippines (Filipino: Ikapitong Kongreso ng Pilipinas), composed of the Philippine Senate and House of Representatives, met from January 26, 1970, until January 17, 1973, during the fifth, sixth, and seventh years of Ferdinand Marcos's presidency.

On September 23, 1972, President Marcos announced to the public that he declared martial law two days prior. Following this, the Congress remained adjourned until it was formally abolished with the ratification of the 1973 Constitution on January 17, 1973. Marcos then exercised legislative powers. In 1976, Congress was replaced by the Batasang Bayan as the Philippines' legislative body until 1978, when it was replaced by the Batasang Pambansa.

One-third of the Senate and the entire membership of the House of Representatives was replaced after the 1969 general elections. The House members and another third of the Senate membership were again replaced after the midterm senatorial elections of 1971.

== Sessions ==
- First Regular Session: January 26 – May 21, 1970
- First Special Session: May 22 – June 25, 1970
- Second Special Session: June 29 – August 1, 1970
- Third Special Session: September 7 – October 10, 1970
- Second Regular Session: January 25 – May 20, 1971
- Fourth Special Session: June 14 – July 17, 1971
- Fifth Special Session: August 2 – September 4, 1971
- Third Regular Session: January 24 – May 18, 1972
- Sixth Special Session: May 19 – June 21, 1972
- Seventh Special Session: June 23 – July 27, 1972
- Eighth Special Session: July 28 – August 31, 1972
- Ninth Special Session: September 1 – 23, 1972

== Legislation ==
The Seventh Congress in its three regular and six special sessions passed a total of 512 acts. Among it were:

RA No	Description
6124	Fixing the Maximum Selling Price of Essential Commodities and the Creation of the Price Control Council
6125	Imposition of a Stabilization Tax on Overseas Consignments
6126	Regulation of Housing Rentals
6127	Amendment to Article 29 of The Revised Penal Code
6128	Municipal and Barrio Boundary Dispute Settlement
6131	Conferring of Filipino citizenship to Dr. Patrick B. Connoh
6132	"The 1971 Constitutional Convention Act"
6139	Regulation of Tuition and Other School Fees of Private Educational Institutions
6234	Creation of Metropolitan Waterworks and Sewerage System
6235	Prohibition of Acts Inimical to Civil Aviation
6236	Extension of Free Patents Application and Judicial Confirmation of Incomplete or Imperfect Titles
6245	Offering of B.S. Industrial Education and B.S. Industrial Arts degrees at the Abra School of Arts and Trades
6260	"Coconut Investment Act"
6289	Establishment of a Limnological Station in Kitcharao, Agusan del Norte
6345	Establishment of a School of Fisheries in Loon, Bohol
6349	Rent Control Regulation
6366	Rehabilitation and Modernization of the Philippine National Railways
6388	"Election Code of 1971"
6389	Agricultural Land Reform Code Amendment
6390	Creation of Agrarian Reform Special Account
6395	National Power Corporation Charter Revision
6397	Integration of the Philippine Bar
6410	Salary Standardization in the Department of Education
6425	"The Dangerous Drugs Act of 1972"
6426	"Foreign Currency Deposit Act of the Philippines"
6440	Creation of Barrio Fortuna in Marcos, Ilocos Norte
6452	Making Masinloc, Zambales a Port of Entry
6489	Creation of the Municipality of Cabanglasan, Bukidnon
6516	Providing for the Sale Of Agricultural Public Lands
6533	Congson Ice Plant And Cold Storage, Inc. Franchise
6539	"Anti-Carnapping Act of 1972"
6551	"General Appropriations Act of 1972"
6552	"Realty Installment Buyer Act"
6591	Creation of Juvenile and Domestic Relations Court in the Province of Camarines Sur, Iriga and Naga Cities

== Leadership ==
=== Senate ===
Senate President

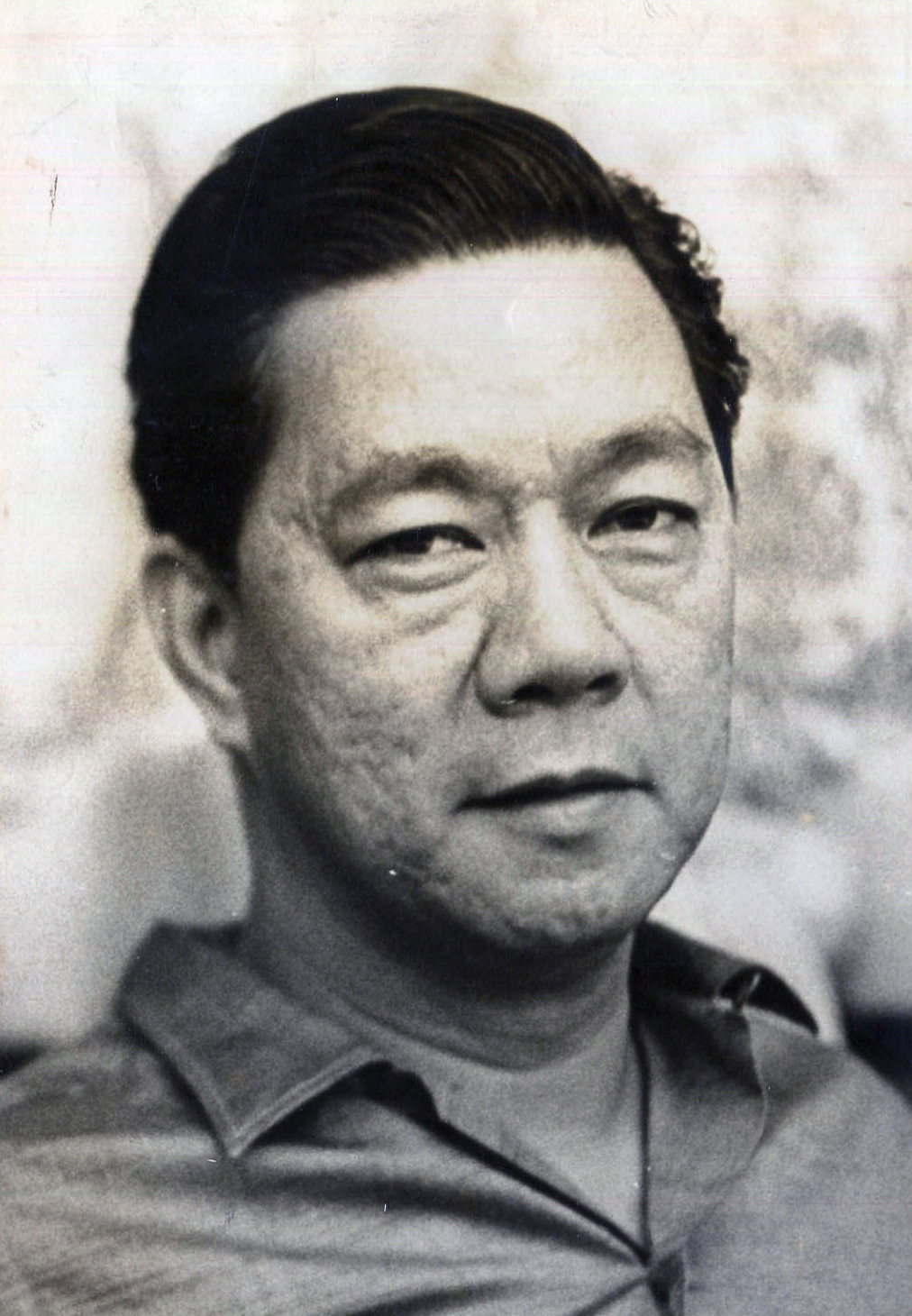
Gil Puyat

- President: Gil Puyat (Nacionalista)
- President pro tempore: Jose Roy (Nacionalista)
- Majority Floor Leader: Arturo Tolentino (Nacionalista)
- Minority Floor Leader: Gerardo Roxas (Liberal)

=== House of Representatives ===
House Speaker

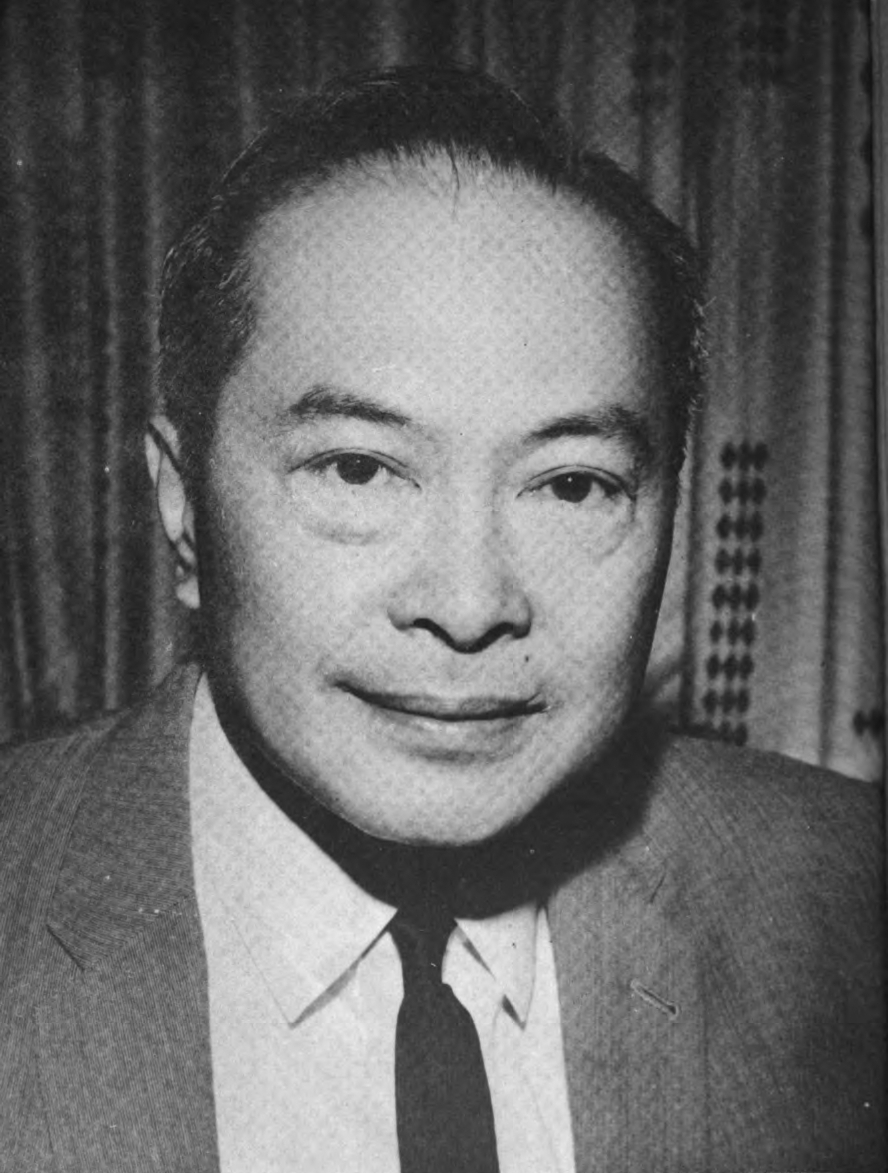
Jose Laurel Jr.,
until April 1, 1971

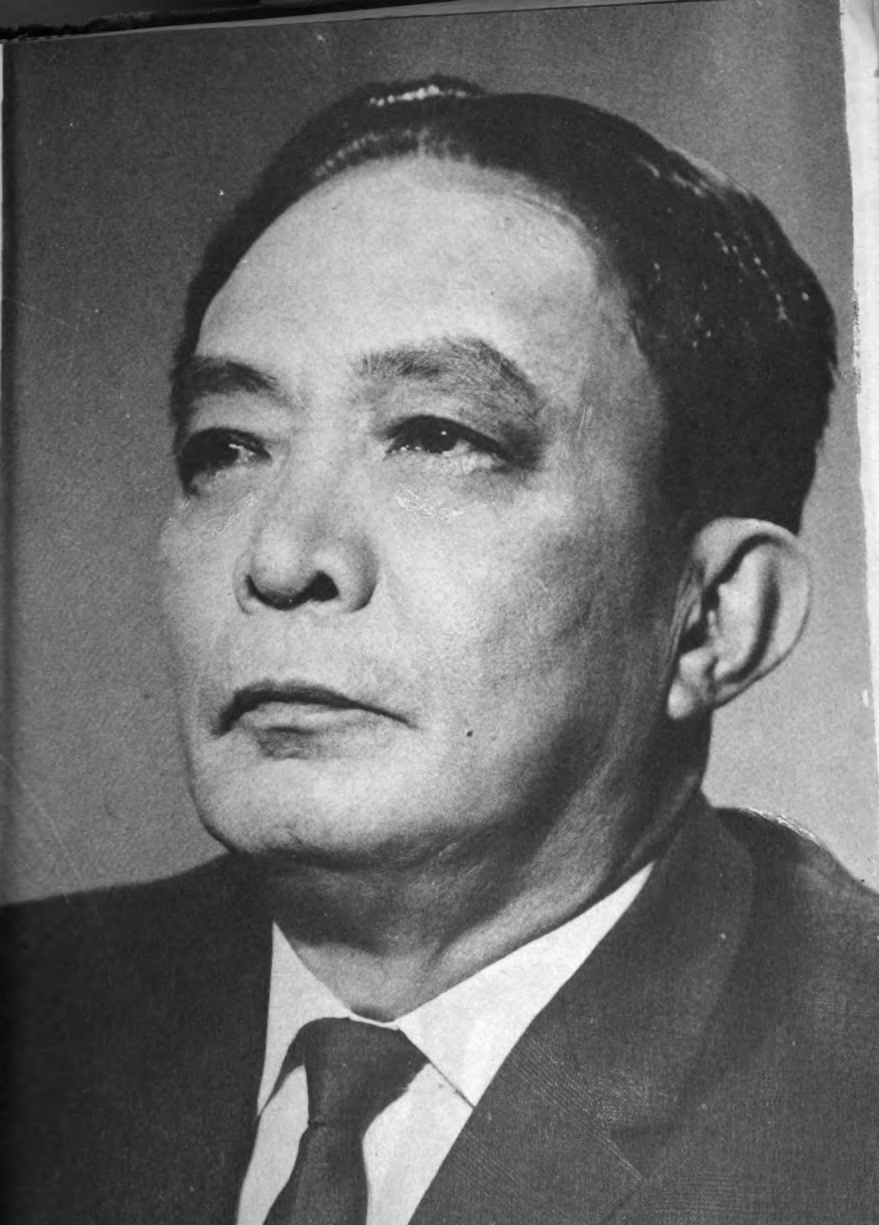
Cornelio Villareal,
from April 1, 1971

- Speaker:
  - Jose Laurel Jr. (Batangas–3rd, Nacionalista), until April 1, 1971
  - Cornelio Villareal (Capiz–2nd, Liberal), from April 1, 1971
- Speaker pro tempore: Jose Aldeguer (Iloilo–5th, Liberal)
- Majority Floor Leader: Marcelino Veloso (Leyte–3rd, Nacionalista)
- Minority Floor Leader:
  - Justiniano Montano (Cavite, Liberal), until June 12, 1971
  - Ramon Mitra Jr. (Palawan, Liberal), June 12 – December 30, 1971
  - Ramon Felipe Jr. (Camarines Sur–1st, Liberal), from January 24, 1972

== Members ==
=== Senate ===
Composition of the Senate during the 7th Congress' 1st and 2nd (left), and 3rd & 4th (right) sessions.

The following are the terms of the senators of this Congress, according to the date of election:

- For senators elected on November 9, 1965: December 30, 1965 – December 30, 1971
- For senators elected on November 14, 1967: December 30, 1967 – December 30, 1973
- For senators elected on November 11, 1969: December 30, 1969 – December 30, 1975
- For senators elected on November 8, 1971: December 30, 1971 – December 30, 1977

The Senate adjourned following the declaration of martial law on September 23, 1972. It was then formally abolished with the ratification of the 1973 Constitution on January 17, 1973.

Senator	Party	Term end
Alejandro Almendras	Nacionalista	1971, 1977
Magnolia Antonino	Liberal	1973
Ninoy Aquino	Liberal	1973
Dominador Aytona	Nacionalista	1971
Helena Benitez	Nacionalista	1973
Jose W. Diokno	Nacionalista	1975
Rene Espina	Liberal	1975
Eva Estrada Kalaw	Nacionalista	1971, 1977
Eddie Ilarde	Liberal	1971
Wenceslao Lagumbay	Nacionalista	1975
Salvador Laurel	Nacionalista	1973
Ernesto Maceda	Nacionalista	1971
Genaro Magsaysay	Nacionalista	1971, 1977
Ramon Mitra Jr.	Liberal	1971
John Henry Osmeña	Liberal	1971
Sergio Osmeña Jr.	Liberal	1971
Ambrosio Padilla	Liberal	1975
Emmanuel Pelaez	Nacionalista	1973
Leonardo B. Perez	Nacionalista	1973
Gil Puyat	Nacionalista	1975
Gerardo Roxas	Liberal	1975
Jose Roy	Nacionalista	1973
Jovito Salonga	Liberal	1971, 1977
Lorenzo Sumulong	Nacionalista	1975
Mamintal A. J. Tamano	Nacionalista	1975
Lorenzo Tañada	NCP	1971
Lorenzo Teves	Nacionalista	1973
Arturo Tolentino	Nacionalista	1975

=== House of Representatives ===
Composition of the House of Representatives during the 7th Congress.

7th Congress representation map of the Philippines

The term of office of the members of the House of Representatives was from December 30, 1969, to December 30, 1973.

The House of Representatives adjourned following the declaration of martial law on September 23, 1972. It was then formally abolished with the ratification of the 1973 Constitution on January 17, 1973.

Province/City	District	Representative	Party
Abra	Lone	Carmelo Barbero	Liberal
Agusan del Norte	Lone	Guillermo Sanchez	Nacionalista
Agusan del Sur	Lone	Democrito Plaza	Nacionalista
Aklan	Lone	Rafael Legaspi	Nacionalista
Albay	1st	Armando Cope	Nacionalista
Albay	2nd	Carlos R. Imperial	Nacionalista
Albay	3rd	Roberto Sabido	Nacionalista
Antique	Lone	Enrique Zaldivar	Liberal
Bataan	Lone	Pablo Roman	Nacionalista
Batanes	Lone	Rufino Antonio Jr. (Note: Rufino Antonio Jr. was removed by the Supreme Court on April 17, 1970, after an electoral protest.)	Nacionalista (independent)
Batanes	Lone	Jorge Abad (Note: Jorge Abad replaced Rufino Antonio Jr. on April 17, 1970, after winning an electoral protest.)	Liberal
Batangas	1st	Roberto Diokno	Independent
Batangas	2nd	Expedito Leviste	Nacionalista
Batangas	3rd	Jose Laurel Jr.	Nacionalista
Benguet	Lone	Andres Cosalan	Nacionalista
Bohol	1st	Natalio Castillo	Nacionalista
Bohol	2nd	Pablo Malasarte	Nacionalista
Bohol	3rd	Teodoro Galagar	Nacionalista
Bukidnon	Lone	Cesar Fortich	Nacionalista
Bulacan	1st	Teodulo Natividad	Nacionalista
Bulacan	2nd	Rogaciano Mercado	Nacionalista
Cagayan	1st	Tito Dupaya	Nacionalista
Cagayan	2nd	David Puzon	Nacionalista
Camarines Norte	Lone	Fernando Pajarillo	Nacionalista
Camarines Sur	1st	Ramon Felipe Jr.	Liberal
Camarines Sur	2nd	Felix Fuentebella	Nacionalista
Camiguin	Lone	Jose Neri	Nacionalista
Capiz	1st	Juliano A. Alba	Liberal
Capiz	2nd	Cornelio Villareal	Nacionalista
Catanduanes	Lone	Jose M. Alberto	Nacionalista
Cavite	Lone	Justiniano Montano	Liberal
Cebu	1st	Ramon Durano Sr.	Nacionalista
Cebu	2nd	John Henry Osmeña (Note: John Henry Osmeña took office as Senator of the Philippines on December 30, 1971.)	Liberal
Cebu	3rd	Eduardo Gullas	Nacionalista
Cebu	4th	Gaudencio Beduya	Nacionalista
Cebu	5th	Emerito Calderon	Nacionalista
Cebu	6th	Manuel Zosa	Nacionalista
Cebu	7th	Celestino Sybico Jr.	Nacionalista
Cotabato	Lone	Salipada Pendatun	Liberal
Davao del Norte	Lone	Lorenzo Sarmiento	Nacionalista
Davao del Sur	Lone	Artemio Loyola	Nacionalista
Davao Oriental	Lone	Constancio Maglana	Nacionalista
Eastern Samar	Lone	Felipe Abrigo	Nacionalista
Ifugao	Lone	Romulo Lumauig	Nacionalista
Ilocos Norte	1st	Roque Ablan Jr.	Nacionalista
Ilocos Norte	2nd	Simeon Valdez	Nacionalista
Ilocos Sur	1st	Floro Crisologo (Note: Floro Crisologo was assassinated on October 20, 1970.)	Nacionalista
Ilocos Sur	2nd	Lucas Cauton	Nacionalista
Iloilo	1st	Jose Zulueta	Independent
Iloilo	2nd	Fermin Caram Jr.	Nacionalista
Iloilo	3rd	Gloria Tabiana	Nacionalista (independent)
Iloilo	4th	Mariano Peñaflorida	Nacionalista
Iloilo	5th	Jose Aldeguer	Nacionalista
Isabela	Lone	Rodolfo Albano Jr.	Nacionalista
Kalinga-Apayao	Lone	Felipe Almazan	Nacionalista
La Union	1st	Joaquin Ortega	Nacionalista
La Union	2nd	Jose Aspiras	Nacionalista
Laguna	1st	Joaquin Chipeco	Nacionalista
Laguna	2nd	Leonides de Leon	Nacionalista
Lanao del Norte	Lone	Mohammad Ali Dimaporo	Nacionalista
Lanao del Sur	Lone	Macacuna Dimaporo	Nacionalista
Leyte	1st	Artemio Mate	Nacionalista
Leyte	2nd	Salud Vivero-Parreño (Note: Representative-elect Salud Vivero-Parreño died on December 27, 1969.)	Nacionalista
Leyte	3rd	Marcelino Veloso	Nacionalista
Leyte	4th	Rodolfo Rivilla	Nacionalista
Manila	1st	Francisco G. Reyes	Nacionalista
Manila	2nd	Joaquin R. Roces	Nacionalista
Manila	3rd	Ramon Bagatsing (Note: Ramon Bagatsing was elected as Mayor of Manila on November 8, 1971.)	Nacionalista
Manila	4th	Pablo V. Ocampo	Nacionalista
Marinduque	Lone	Francisco Lecaroz	Liberal
Masbate	Lone	Emilio Espinosa Jr.	Nacionalista
Misamis Occidental	Lone	William Chiongbian	Nacionalista
Misamis Oriental	Lone	Pedro Roa	Nacionalista
Mountain Province	Lone	Alfredo Lamen	Liberal
Negros Occidental	1st	Armando Gustilo	Nacionalista
Negros Occidental	2nd	Roberto Montelibano	Nacionalista
Negros Occidental	3rd	Agustin Gatuslao	Nacionalista
Negros Oriental	1st	Herminio Teves	Nacionalista
Negros Oriental	2nd	Lamberto Macias	Nacionalista
Northern Samar	Lone	Raul Daza	Liberal
Nueva Ecija	1st	Leopoldo Diaz	Nacionalista
Nueva Ecija	2nd	Angel Concepcion	Nacionalista
Nueva Vizcaya	Lone	Benjamin B. Perez	Nacionalista
Occidental Mindoro	Lone	Pedro Medalla	Nacionalista
Oriental Mindoro	Lone	Jose Leido Jr.	Nacionalista
Palawan	Lone	Ramon Mitra Jr. (Note: Ramon Mitra Jr. took office as Senator of the Philippines on December 30, 1971.)	Liberal
Pampanga	1st	Jose B. Lingad	Liberal
Pampanga	2nd	Rogelio Tiglao (Note: Seat was vacant until 1972 when Rogelio Tiglao was declared the winner after an electoral protest)	Liberal
Pangasinan	1st	Aguedo Agbayani (Note: Aguedo Agbayani took office as Governor of Pangasinan on December 30, 1971.)	Nacionalista
Pangasinan	2nd	Jose de Venecia Jr.	Liberal
Pangasinan	3rd	Corazon Primicias (Note: Corazon Primicias was removed by the House of Representatives Electoral Tribunal on January 24, 1972, after an electoral protest.)	Nacionalista
Pangasinan	3rd	Fabian Sison (Note: Fabian Sison replaced Corazon Primicias on January 24, 1972, after winning an electoral protest.)	Liberal
Pangasinan	4th	Antonio Villar	Nacionalista
Pangasinan	5th	Roberto B. Estrella	Nacionalista
Quezon	1st	Moises Escueta	Liberal
Quezon	2nd	Godofredo Tan	Nacionalista
Rizal	1st	Neptali Gonzales	Liberal
Rizal	2nd	Frisco San Juan Sr.	Nacionalista
Romblon	Lone	Esteban Madrona	Liberal
Samar	Lone	Fernando Veloso	Nacionalista
Sorsogon	1st	Salvador Encinas	Nacionalista
Sorsogon	2nd	Rafael Aquino	Nacionalista
South Cotabato	Lone	James Chiongbian	Nacionalista
Southern Leyte	Lone	Nicanor Yñiguez	Nacionalista
Sulu	Lone	Indanan Anni	Nacionalista
Surigao del Norte	Lone	Constantino Navarro Sr.	Nacionalista
Surigao del Sur	Lone	Jose Puyat Jr.	Nacionalista
Tarlac	1st	Danding Cojuangco	Nacionalista
Tarlac	2nd	Jose V. Yap	Liberal
Zambales	Lone	Antonio Diaz	Nacionalista
Zamboanga del Norte	Lone	Felipe Azcuna	Nacionalista (independent)
Zamboanga del Sur	Lone	Vicente Cerilles	Nacionalista

== See also ==
- Congress of the Philippines
- Senate of the Philippines
- House of Representatives of the Philippines
- 1969 Philippine general election
- 1971 Philippine general election
