= Fernando Veloso =

Filipino lawyer and politician (1918–1998)

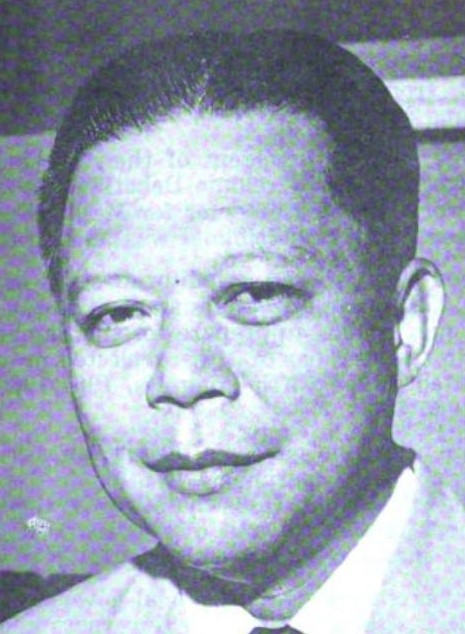
- Veloso in the 6th Congress

Member of the Batasang Pambansa
- In office June 30, 1984 – March 25, 1986 Serving with Jose Roño
- Constituency: Samar at-large
- In office June 12, 1978 – June 30, 1984 Serving with many others
- Constituency: Region VIII at-large

Member of the Batasang Bayan
- In office September 21, 1976 – June 12, 1978

Member of the Philippine House of Representatives
- In office December 30, 1969 – January 17, 1973
- Preceded by: Himself (as member for Western Samar)
- Succeeded by: District abolished (seat next held by Jose Roño and himself in 1984)
- Constituency: Samar at-large
- In office December 30, 1965 – December 30, 1969
- Preceded by: District created
- Succeeded by: Himself (as member for Samar)
- Constituency: Western Samar at-large
- In office December 30, 1961 – December 30, 1965
- Preceded by: Valeriano Yancha
- Succeeded by: District abolished (seat next held by Venancio Garduce in 1987)
- Constituency: Samar–2nd

Governor of Samar
- In office 1955–1961
- Preceded by: Decoroso Rosales
- Succeeded by: Vicente Valley

Personal details
- Born: Fernando Roño Veloso; May 30, 1918 Calbayog, Samar, Philippine Islands
- Died: 1998 (aged 79–80)
- Party: GAD (1987)
- Other political affiliations: KBL (1978–1986); Nacionalista (1955–1978)
- Spouse: Rosario de los Reyes
- Children: 3

Fernando Roño Veloso (May 30, 1918 – c. 1998) was a Filipino lawyer and politician who served as a member of the Batasang Pambansa for Samar's at-large parliamentary district from 1984 to 1986 and Region VIII's at-large parliamentary district from 1978 to 1984. He previously served in the House of Representatives as a member for Samar's 2nd congressional district from 1961 to 1965, Western Samar's at-large district from 1965 to 1969, and Samar's at-large district from 1969 to 1972, and as governor of Samar from 1955 to 1961.

== Early life and education ==
Veloso was born on May 30, 1918, in Calbayog, Samar, to former representative Manuel Veloso and Paz Rosales Roño. He attended Calbayog Elementary School for his primary education and Colegio de San Vicente de Paul for his secondary education. In 1941, Veloso was a second-year law student at the Arellano University when World War II broke out. He completed his legal studies at the Manila Law College in 1946, earning his Bachelor of Laws degree in 1949, and passing the Bar examinations in the same year.

== Career ==
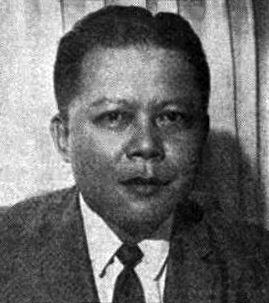
Veloso in 1967

Veloso successfully ran for governor of Samar in 1955, after quitting his post as a legal assistant at the Luzon Stevedoring Company. He was re-elected in 1959, but midway through his second term, ran for Samar's 2nd congressional district seat in the House of Representatives under the Nacionalista Party. Following the passage of Republic Act No. 4221 in June 1965, he was redistricted to the new Western Samar's at-large district, where he won a second term as representative. He then later made his first unsuccessful bid for the Senate in 1967.

Veloso was re-elected in 1969 after the district's redesignation as Samar's at-large district, and served until the imposition of martial law in 1972. Among the committees he became a member of during the 5th Congress were the committees on commerce and industry, education, provincial and municipal governments, public works, preparations, and war veterans.

In 1976, Veloso was appointed by President Ferdinand Marcos to the Batasang Bayan, a legislative advisory council. After Congress was previously abolished with the adoption of a new Constitution in 1973, a new parliament was established, known as the Batasang Pambansa, and Veloso ran under the ruling Kilusang Bagong Lipunan party for Region VIII's at-large district, placing fourth among 10 elected members. When provincial and city districts were revived in 1984, he sought his former congressional seat representing the whole province of Samar and won, placing second in the election, only behind his cousin and deputy prime minister, Jose Roño. Marcos was deposed by the peaceful 1986 People Power Revolution and was succeeded by Corazon Aquino.

The first national elections under the new Constitution were called in 1987, when Veloso ran for the re-established Senate under the Grand Alliance for Democracy. He lost, placing 48th among 24 seats up for election. He subsequently retired from public office.

== Personal life ==
Veloso was married to Rosario de los Reyes, with whom he had three children: Carina, Sylvia, and Lina. He was the brother of former House majority leader Marcelino Veloso and the nephew of former senators Jose Maria Veloso, Esteban Singson, and Pastor Salazar. He died in 1998.

== Electoral history ==
Electoral history of Fernando Veloso
| Year | Office | Party | Votes received | | | | Result |
| Year | Office | Party | Total | % | P. | Swing | Result |
|---|---|---|---|---|---|---|---|
| 1955 | Governor of Samar | Nacionalista | —N/a | —N/a | 1st | —N/a | Won |
| 1961 | Representative (Samar–2nd) | Nacionalista | —N/a | —N/a | 1st | —N/a | Won |
| 1965 | Representative (Western Samar) | Nacionalista | —N/a | —N/a | 1st | —N/a | Won |
| 1969 | Representative (Samar) | Nacionalista | —N/a | —N/a | 1st | —N/a | Won |
| 1978 | Assemblyman (Region VIII) | KBL | 412,904 | 8.23% | 4th | —N/a | Won |
| 1984 | Assemblyman (Samar) | KBL | 27,748 | —N/a | 2nd | —N/a | Won |
| 1967 | Senator of the Philippines | Nacionalista | 2,935,418 | 36.89% | 10th | —N/a | Lost |
| 1987 | Senator of the Philippines | GAD | 1,660,100 | 7.30% | 48th | −29.59 | Lost |

House of Representatives of the Philippines
| New district | Member of the Batasang Pambansa for Samar's at-large district June 30, 1984 – March 25, 1986 | District abolished |
| New district | Member of the Batasang Pambansa for Region VIII's at-large district June 12, 1978 – June 30, 1984 | District abolished |
| Preceded by Himself (as member for Western Samar) | Member of the Philippine House of Representatives for Samar's at-large district December 30, 1969 – January 17, 1973 | Vacant Martial law and adoption of the 1973 Constitution Title next held by Himself and Jose Roño (in the Batasang Pambansa) |
| New district | Member of the Philippine House of Representatives for Western Samar's at-large district December 30, 1965 – December 30, 1969 | Succeeded by Himself (as member for Samar) |
| Preceded by Valeriano Yancha | Member of the Philippine House of Representatives for Samar's 2nd district December 30, 1961 – December 30, 1965 | Vacant Martial law and adoption of the 1973 Constitution Title next held by Venancio Garduce |
Political offices
| Preceded by Decoroso Rosales | Governor of Samar; 1955–1961 | Succeeded by Vicente Valley |
