= Northern Samar's at-large congressional district =

Legislative district of the Philippines

Northern Samar's at-large congressional district was a short-lived congressional district that encompassed the entire province of Northern Samar in the Philippines. It was represented in the House of Representatives from 1965 to 1972 and in the Batasang Pambansa from 1984 to 1986. The province of Northern Samar was created as a result of the partition of Samar in 1965 and elected its first representative provincewide at-large during that year's House elections. It first elected a representative provincewide at-large for the 6th Congress of the Third Philippine Republic under the old configuration of Samar's 1st congressional district, which comprised the present-day Eastern Samar and Catbalogan, in 1965 and automatically transitioned into this district once the concurrent Samar division plebiscite officially ratified Republic Act No. 4221, with Catbalogan becoming part of Western Samar's at-large district. Eladio T. Balite, who previously served as representative for the old 1st congressional district of Samar, also served as the new province's first representative. A special election was held two years later in 1967 concurrent with that year's Senate election following Balite's death, with the province electing Eusebio Moore to serve his remaining term in the 6th Congress.

The district was eliminated following the dissolution of the lower house in 1972 but was later absorbed by the multi-member Region VIII's at-large district for the interim parliament in 1978. In 1984, provincial and city representations were restored with Northern Samar electing a member for the regular parliament from the same provincewide electoral district. The district finally became obsolete following the 1987 reapportionment that established two districts in the province under a new constitution.

== Representation history ==
| # | Image | Member | Term of office | | Congress | Party | Electoral history |
| # | Image | Member | Start | End | Congress | Party | Electoral history |
|---|---|---|---|---|---|---|---|
=== Northern Samar's at-large district for the House of Representatives of the Philippines ===
District created June 19, 1965.
| 1 | | Eladio T. Balite | December 30, 1965 | August 24, 1967 | 6th | Liberal | Redistricted from Samar's 1st district and re-elected in 1965. Died. |
| 2 | | Eusebio Moore | January 22, 1968 | December 30, 1969 | 6th | Nacionalista | Elected in 1967 to finish Balite's term. |
| 3 | | Raul Daza | December 30, 1969 | September 23, 1972 | 7th | Liberal | Elected in 1969. Removed from office after imposition of martial law. |
District dissolved into the ten-seat Region VIII's at-large district for the Interim Batasang Pambansa.
| # | Image | Member | Term of office | | Batasang Pambansa | Party | Electoral history |
| # | Image | Member | Start | End | Batasang Pambansa | Party | Electoral history |
=== Northern Samar's at-large district for the Regular Batasang Pambansa ===
District re-created February 1, 1984.
| 4 | | Edilberto A. del Valle | July 23, 1984 | March 25, 1986 | 2nd | KBL | Elected in 1984. |
District dissolved into Northern Samar's 1st and 2nd districts.

== See also ==
- Legislative districts of Northern Samar
