= Jose P. Bengzon =

Former secretary of justice and associate justice of the Philippine Supreme Court

- Portrait as Associate Justice of the Supreme Court, taken c. 1967

Secretary of Justice
- In office August 29, 1950 – September 23, 1951
- Appointed by: Elpidio Quirino
- Preceded by: Ricardo Nepomuceno
- Succeeded by: Oscar Castelo

76th Associate Justice of the Supreme Court of the Philippines
- In office September 12, 1964 – May 5, 1968
- Appointed by: Diosdado Macapagal
- Preceded by: Felipe Natividad
- Succeeded by: Julio Villamor

Presiding Justice of the Court of Appeals
- In office May 24, 1962 – September 12, 1964
- Appointed by: Diosdado Macapagal
- Preceded by: Querube Makalintal
- Succeeded by: Conrado Sanchez

Commissioner of the Bureau of Immigration
- In office 1950–1950
- Appointed by: Elpidio Quirino
- Preceded by: Engracio Fabre
- Succeeded by: Vicente dela Cruz

Member of the Batasang Pambansa from Region IV
- In office June 12, 1978 – June 30, 1984

Member of the Batasang Bayan
- In office September 21, 1976 – June 12, 1978

Member of the Philippine House of Representatives for Pangasinan's 1st district
- In office June 9, 1945 – May 25, 1946
- Preceded by: Anacleto Ramos
- Succeeded by: Juan de Guzman Rodriguez

Personal details
- Born: Jose Pio Bengzon y Acosta; May 5, 1898 Lingayen, Pangasinan, Captaincy General of the Philippines
- Died: February 4, 1990 (aged 91)
- Party: KBL (1978–1984)
- Other political affiliations: Liberal (1951); Nacionalista (1941–1946)
- Spouse: Antonia Jimenez
- Children: 5

Jose Pio Acosta Bengzon (May 5, 1898 – February 4, 1990) was a Filipino jurist and politician who served as secretary of justice from 1950 to 1951, presiding justice of the Court of Appeals from 1962 to 1964, and associate justice of the Supreme Court of the Philippines from 1964 to 1968. He was also a member of the Batasang Pambansa representing Region IV's at-large district from 1978 to 1984, and of the House of Representatives for Pangasinan's 1st district from 1945 to 1946.

== Early life and education ==
Bengzon was born on May 5, 1898, in Lingayen, Pangasinan, to Jose Bengzon and Felicidad Acosta. He graduated cum laude with a Bachelor of Arts degree from Ateneo de Manila University and later earned a Bachelor of Laws degree from the University of the Philippines College of Law.

== Career ==
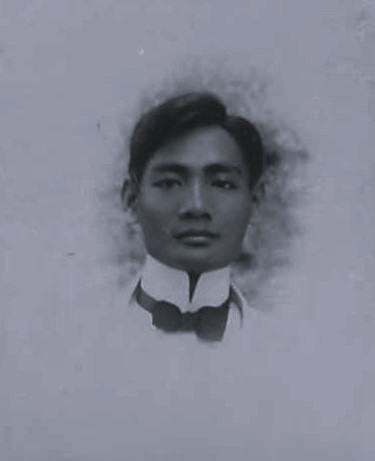
Bengzon on his United States passport application in 1917

Bengzon's earliest known career was his election as a municipal councilor of Lingayen. In 1941, he ran under the Nacionalista Party as a member of the House of Representatives for Pangasinan's 1st congressional district and won. He was only able to assume office in 1945 following the Japanese occupation of the Philippines, serving in the 1st Commonwealth Congress. In early 1950, he was appointed commissioner of the Bureau of Immigration and served as justice undersecretary until his appointment as secretary of justice by President Elpidio Quirino in August of the same year. Bengzon stepped down from his cabinet post to run for the Senate under the Liberal Party in 1951, but lost, placing ninth among the eight contested seats, all of which were won by Nacionalista candidates.

Within his legal career, Bengzon served as president and chairman of the board of the Manila Gas Corporation; a law professor, dean of the College of Law, and acting vice president of the Francisco College; and chief of mission with the rank of minister for the Philippine Reparations Mission in Tokyo, Japan.

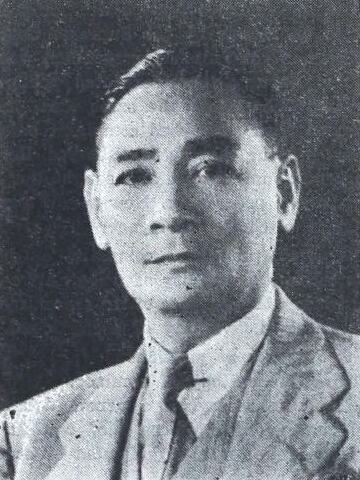
Bengzon in an undated photograph

In May 1962, President Diosdado Macapagal appointed him presiding justice of the Court of Appeals. He served until September 12, 1964, when he was appointed associate justice of the Supreme Court, succeeding Felipe Natividad. He retired in May 1968 upon reaching the mandatory retirement age of 70.

In 1978, he successfully ran for the Interim Batasang Pambansa under Kilusang Bagong Lipunan as an assemblyman for the 21-member Region IV at-large district, placing twelfth. He retired from public office after his parliamentary tenure ended in 1984.

== Personal life ==
Bengzon was married to Antonia Jimenez, with whom he had five children. He died on February 4, 1990.

== Electoral history ==
Electoral history of Jose P. Bengzon
Year	Office	Party	Votes received				Result
Year	Office	Party	Total	%	P.	Swing	Result
1941	Representative (Pangasinan–1st)	Nacionalista	—N/a	—N/a	1st	—N/a	Won
1951	Senator of the Philippines	Liberal	1,277,925	29.10%	9th	—N/a	Lost
1978	Assemblyman (Region IV)	KBL	1,565,450	2.82%	12th	—N/a	Won

Political offices
Preceded by Ricardo Nepomuceno	Secretary of Justice; 1950–1951	Succeeded by Oscar Castelo
Preceded by Engracio Fabre	Commissioner of the Bureau of Immigration; 1950	Succeeded by Vicente dela Cruz
Legal offices
Preceded by Felipe Natividad	Associate Justice of the Supreme Court; 1964–1968	Succeeded by Julio Villamor
Preceded by Querube Makalintal	Presiding Justice of the Court of Appeals; 1962–1964	Succeeded by Conrado Sanchez
House of Representatives of the Philippines
New district	Member of the Batasang Pambansa from Region IV; 1978–1984	District abolished
Preceded by Anacleto Ramos	Member of the Philippine House of Representatives for Pangasinan's 1st district 1945–1946	Succeeded by Juan de Guzman Rodriguez
