= Marcelino Veloso =

Filipino lawyer and politician (1919–1986)

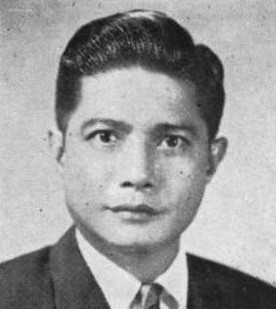
- Veloso in the 6th Congress

House Majority Leader
- In office February 2, 1967 – January 17, 1973
- Speaker: Jose Laurel Jr. Cornelio Villareal
- Preceded by: Justiniano Montano
- Succeeded by: Jose Roño (as Floor Leader of the Batasang Pambansa)

Member of the Philippine House of Representatives from Leyte
- In office December 30, 1961 – January 17, 1973
- Preceded by: Nicanor Yñiguez
- Succeeded by: District abolished (seat next held by Alberto Veloso in 1987)
- Constituency: 3rd district
- In office December 30, 1957 – December 30, 1961
- Preceded by: Carlos Tan
- Succeeded by: Daniel Romualdez
- Constituency: 1st district

Personal details
- Born: Marcelino Roño Veloso; June 2, 1919 Calbayog, Samar, Philippine Islands
- Died: May 11, 1986 (aged 66)
- Party: Nacionalista (1957–1986)
- Spouse: Virginia Kintana
- Children: 7

Marcelino Roño Veloso (June 2, 1919 – May 11, 1986) was a Filipino lawyer and politician who served as House majority leader from 1967 to 1973. He represented Leyte's 3rd district in the House of Representatives from 1961 to 1973 and its 1st district from 1957 to 1961.

== Early life and education ==
Veloso was born on June 2, 1919, in Calbayog, Samar, to former representative Manuel Veloso and Paz Rosales Roño. He attended Calbayog Elementary School for his primary education and Leyte High School for his secondary education. In 1941, Veloso was a third-year law student at the University of the Philippines when World War II broke out. He returned to Leyte and completed his legal studies at the Manila Law College in 1946, earning his Bachelor of Laws degree following the liberation of the Philippines.

== Career ==
After the war, Veloso was appointed docket clerk of the People's Court. He later resigned to join the law office of his uncle, former senator Pastor Salazar, and subsequently established a successful career as a trial lawyer.

In 1955, Veloso was elected to the Leyte Provincial Board. He was elected in 1957 to represent Leyte's 1st district in the House of Representatives during the 4th Congress. In 1961, he successfully ran for the province's 3rd district and was re-elected twice before being removed from office following the imposition of martial law. During the first regular session of the 6th Congress, he served as assistant minority floor leader.

Following the election of Jose Laurel Jr. as speaker on February 2, 1967, Veloso was elected House majority leader, serving until the abolition of Congress in 1973.

== Personal life ==
Veloso was married to Virginia Kintana, with whom he had seven children: Emmanuel, Emmeline, Marianne, Marcelino Jr., Eduardo, Jose Antonio, and Rafael. He was the brother of former Samar representative Fernando Veloso and the nephew of former senators Jose Maria Veloso and Esteban Singson.

House of Representatives of the Philippines
Preceded by Justiniano Montano	House Majority Leader; February 2, 1967 – January 17, 1973	Succeeded by Jose Roño (as Majority Leader of the Batasang Pambansa)
Preceded by Nicanor Yñiguez	Member for Rizal's 3rd district December 30, 1961 – January 17, 1973	Vacant Martial law and adoption of the 1973 Constitution Title next held by Alberto Veloso
Preceded by Carlos Tan	Member for Rizal's 1st district December 30, 1957 – December 30, 1961	Succeeded by Daniel Romualdez
