= Batasang Bayan =

- Philippines
- National coat of arms (1946–1978, 1986–1998)

Type
- Type: Consultative

History
- Established: September 21, 1976
- Disbanded: June 12, 1978
- Preceded by: Congress of the Philippines; Interim National Assembly (de jure)
- Succeeded by: Interim Batasang Pambansa
- Seats: 128 members; appointive

Meeting place
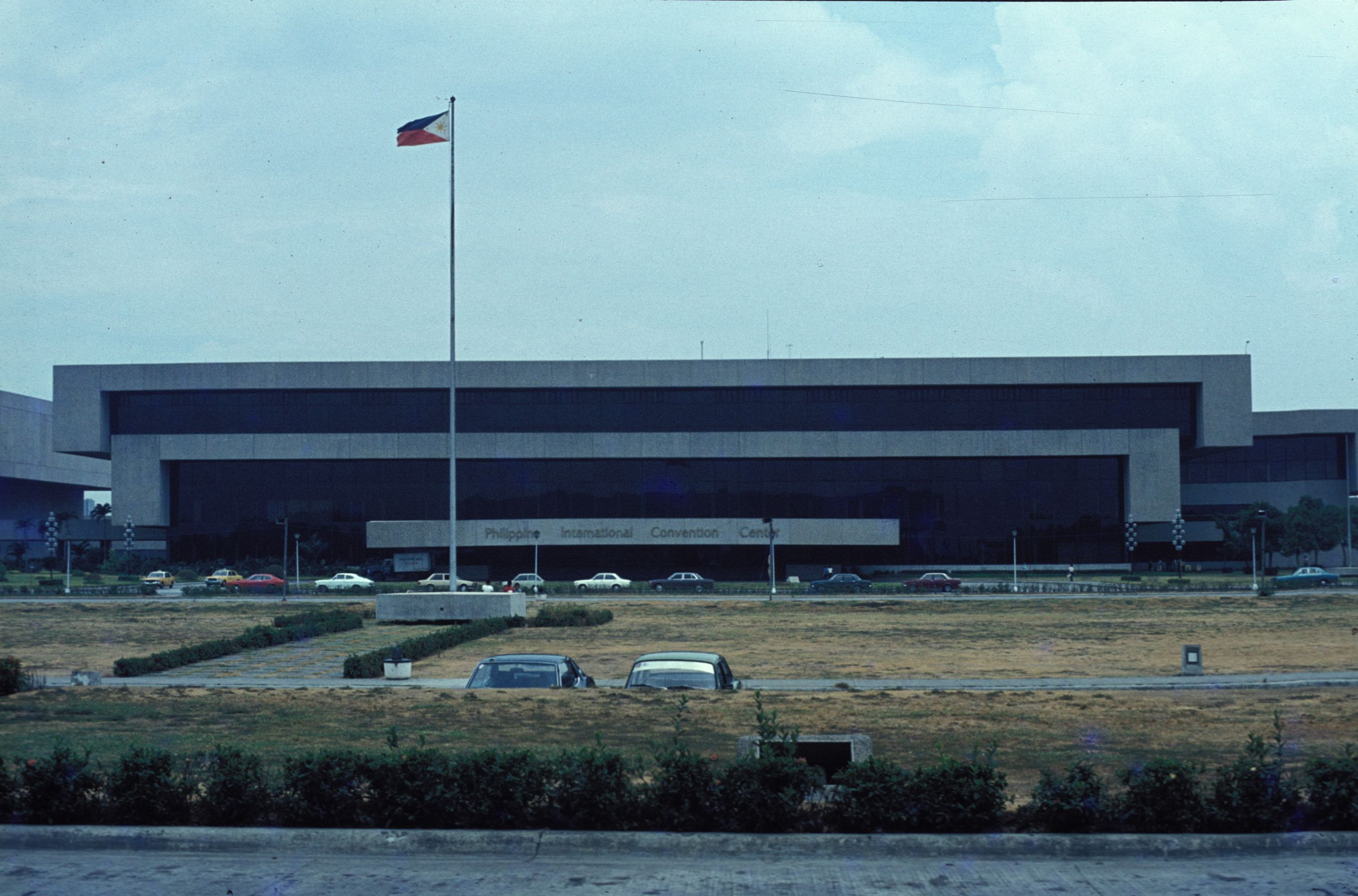
- Philippine International Convention Center

Footnotes
- Though there were about 128 members of the Council, it is unclear how they voted on resolutions or were given voting rights at all since all law-making powers was vested with the President.

The Batasang Bayan (English: Legislative Advisory Council, lit. 'Public Legislature') was the consultative assembly and legislative advisory council in the Philippines that helped formulate decrees promulgated by Ferdinand Marcos from its inauguration on September 21, 1976 to June 12, 1978.

"As such powers and functions shall consist of but not limited to assisting and advising the President of his lawmaking functions, providing a forum for the citizenry, through the herein designated representatives, to ventilate their views on national issues, as well as their opinions on the manner of administering the affairs of the government, providing a forum for the rationalization, unification, and clarification on the policies and programs of the Executive Branch of Government and providing a mechanism for actually conducting a review of the structures, policies and efficiencies of the different Barangays and Sanggunians and submit its finding and recommendations to the President as mandated by the 1973 Constitution as the Philippines shifted from a presidential to a parliamentary form of government and Presidential Decree No. 995." It held its regular and special sessions at the Philippine International Convention Center.

== Sessions ==
- Regular Session: September 21, 1976 – October 30, 1978

== Leadership ==
=== President ===
- Ferdinand Marcos

=== Secretary of Local Governments ===
- Jose Roño

== Functions ==
The Batasang Bayan functioned as a legislative advisory council to the President on legislative matters. Powers and functions consisted of:

- Assisting and advising the President of his lawmaking functions;
- Providing a forum for the citizenry, through the herein designated representatives, to ventilate their views on national issues, as well as their opinions on the manner of administering the affairs of the government;
- Providing a forum for the rationalization, unification, and clarification on the policies and programs of the Executive Branch of Government;
- Providing a mechanism for actually conducting a review of the structures, policies and efficiencies of the different Barangays and Sanggunians and submit its finding and recommendations to the President.

== Members ==
The Batasang Bayan was composed of 128 members, all appointive. Representation came from the highest government entity down to the smallest local government unit (barangay) and the marginalized sectors of society. Particularly, it was composed of the following:

- President of the Republic of the Philippines, the members of the Cabinet, including officials with the rank of Cabinet.
- Provincial governors, city mayors, presidents of regional associations of Barangay and Kabataang Barangay Councils.
- Sectoral representatives of professional, capital-industrial and agricultural.

Region	Member
Cabinet	Vicente Abad Santos
Cabinet	Estefania Aldaba-Lim
Cabinet	Baltazar Aquino
Cabinet	Jose Aspiras
Cabinet	Jacobo C. Clave
Cabinet	Cesar A. Dumlao
Cabinet	Manuel Elizalde Jr.
Cabinet	Juan Ponce Enrile
Cabinet	Conrado Estrella Sr.
Cabinet	Clemente S. Gatmaitan
Cabinet	Alfredo Juinio
Cabinet	Jaime C. Laya
Cabinet	Jose J. Leido Jr.
Cabinet	Melecio S. Magno
Cabinet	Juan L. Manuel
Cabinet	Blas Ople
Cabinet	Vicente Paterno
Cabinet	Troadio T. Quiazon Jr.
Cabinet	Carlos P. Romulo
Cabinet	Jose A. Roño
Cabinet	Gerardo P. Sicat
Cabinet	Arturo R. Tanco Jr.
Cabinet	Francisco Tatad
Cabinet	Bernardo Tensuan
Cabinet	Juan C. Tuvera
Cabinet	Geronimo Z. Velasco
Cabinet	Cesar Virata
Region I	David D. Aguila
Region I	Roque B. De Guzman
Region I	Sergio P. Kawi
Region I	Elizabeth M. Keon
Region I	Ben Palispis
Region I	Crisostomo F. Pariñas
Region I	Sofia V. Reyes
Region I	Catherine B. Singson
Region II	Amadeo P. Bargas Jr.
Region II	Cecil A. Carag
Region II	Faustino N. Dy Jr.
Region II	Joaquin Labrador
Region II	Zosimo Paredes
Region II	Florentino P. Ruiz
Region II	Felipe Salvador
Region II	Virgilio A. Tiongson
Region III	Amadeo G. Alinea
Region III	Rodolfo S. Angeles
Region III	Allyson G. Bautista
Region III	Baldomero T. Mangiliman
Region III	Estelito Mendoza
Region III	Ignacio S. Santiago
Region III	Miguel L. Santos
Region III	Amancio P. Sumabat
Region IV	Emilio M. Abello Sr.
Region IV	Makairog G. Aznar
Region IV	Ramon Bagatsing
Region IV	Jose P. Bengzon
Region IV	Domingo S. Guevarra Jr.
Region IV	Consuelo P. Madrigal
Region IV	Imelda Marcos
Region IV	Rogelio M. Quiambao
Region IV-A	Alipio M. Abrenica
Region IV-A	Fernando C. Campos
Region IV-A	William D. Dichoso
Region IV-A	Antonio Leviste
Region IV-A	Isidro S. Rodriguez Sr.
Region IV-A	Felicisimo San Luis
Region IV-A	Eliseo G. Santos
Region IV-A	Medardo L. Tumagay
Region IV-A	Rizaldy L. Villaseñor
Region V	J. Antonio A. Amparado
Region V	Felixberto A. Camacho
Region V	Socorro G. De Castro
Region V	Leila de Lima
Region V	Emilio Espinosa Jr.
Region V	Eufronio K. Maristela
Region V	Jose L. Sarte Jr.
Region VI	Emiliano G. Bautista Jr.
Region VI	Francisco C. Divinagracia Jr.
Region VI	Liberato R. Ibadlit
Region VI	Remo J. Montelibano
Region VI	Conrado J. Norada
Region VI	Jose A. Reyes
Region VI	Ciceron M. Severino
Region VII	Emilio E. Alcoseba
Region VII	June T. Araula
Region VII	Manolito L. Asok
Region VII	Jose C. Aviles
Region VII	Edilberto A. Del Valle
Region VII	Eduardo Gullas
Region VII	Uriel R. Leopando
Region VII	Timoteo S. Oracion
Region VIII	Emmanuel T. Celada
Region VIII	Arnold R. Lungay
Region VIII	Ramon O. Reyes
Region VIII	Benjamin Romualdez
Region VIII	Valeriano P. Tomol Jr.
Region VIII	Terencio F. Uyloan
Region IX	Damsid J. Abidin
Region IX	Vicente A. Balisado
Region IX	Joaquin F. Enriquez Jr.
Region IX	Romulo Espaldon
Region IX	Muss S. Izquierdo
Region IX	Jose A. Legaspi
Region X	Concordio C. Diel
Region X	Gabriel A. Catane
Region X	Jesus M. Jajalla
Region X	Carlo H. Lozada
Region X	Uldarico B. Mejorada
Region X	Jeddu A. Migriño
Region X	Fernando B. Pacana Jr.
Region X	Vitaliano E. Porio
Region X	Henry V. Regalado
Region X	Guillermo N. Tabios Jr.
Region XI	Modesto G. Avellanosa
Region XI	Susan Dela Rosa
Region XI	Delfin A. Macalinao
Region XI	Rolando C. Marcial
Region XI	Saturnino G. Parcasio
Region XI	Leonardo C. Pascual
Region XI	Luis T. Santos
Region XI	Nur-Hussein Ututalum
Region XII	Simeon Datumanong
Region XII	Omar M. Dianalan
Region XII	Mohammad Ali Dimaporo
Region XII	Ronaldo D. Espina
Region XII	Ronald K. Go
Region XII	Nurodin M. Mamaluba
Region XII	Okuo S. Mapupuno
Region XII	Maximiano R. Martin Jr.
Region XII	Ernesto F. Roldan
At-large	Jose M. Alberto
At-large	Jose Aldeguer
At-large	Vicente M. Cerilles
At-large	Danding Cojuangco
At-large	Rene Espina
At-large	Constantino Navarro Sr.
At-large	Fernando Veloso
At-large	Antonio Raquiza
Youth	Marivic Guevarra

== See also ==
- Congress of the Philippines
- Senate of the Philippines
- House of Representatives of the Philippines
