= Decoroso Rosales =

Filipino politician (1907–1987)

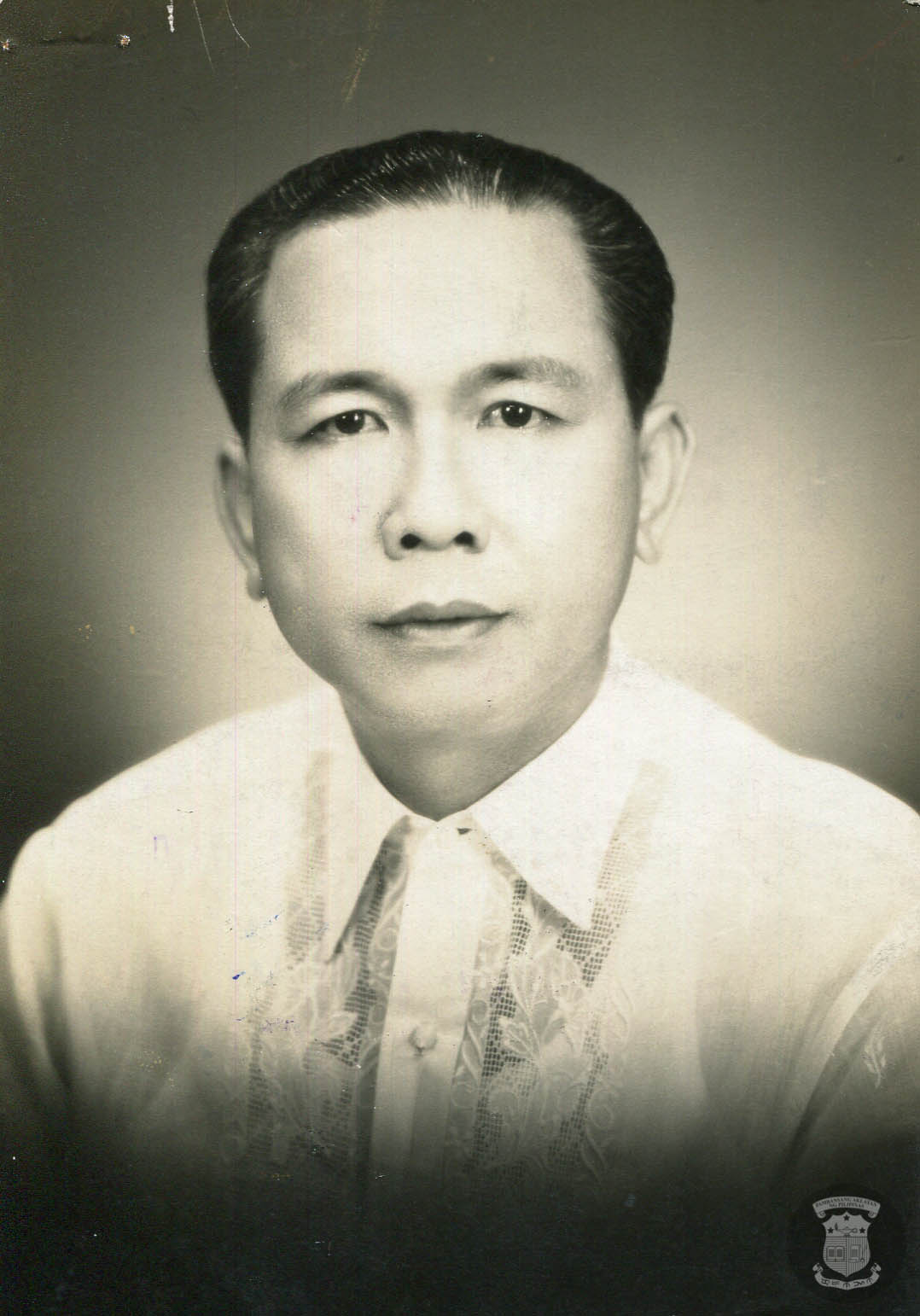
- Official portrait, c. 1955–1961

Senator of the Philippines
- In office December 30, 1955 – December 30, 1961

Governor of Samar
- In office 1950–1955
- Preceded by: Baltazar Avelino
- Succeeded by: Fernando Veloso

Member of the House of Representatives from Samar's 1st district
- In office June 11, 1945 – May 25, 1946
- Preceded by: Agripino Escareal (as Assemblyman)
- Succeeded by: Agripino Escareal

Personal details
- Born: Decoroso Ras Rosales; December 20, 1907 Calbayog, Samar, Philippine Islands
- Died: January 23, 1987 (aged 79) Tacloban, Leyte, Philippines
- Party: Nacionalista
- Relatives: Julio Rosales (brother)

Decoroso Ras Rosales (December 20, 1907 – January 23, 1987) was a Filipino politician.

== Early life and education ==
Rosales was born on December 20, 1907 in Calbayog, Samar, to Basilio Rosales and Aqueda Ras. He received his Associate of Arts degree in 1920 and Bachelor of Laws degree both from the University of the Philippines. He was admitted to the Bar in 1933.

== Political career ==
Rosales was elected in 1941 to the House of Representatives to represent the 1st district of Samar, defeating Secretary of Public Works Jose Avelino, but was not able to take office until 1945 due to the Japanese invasion during the Second World War. During that period, he joined the resistance movement and became civil administrator for unoccupied areas of Cebu, attaining the rank of Colonel. In 1947, he ran for Governor of Samar as a Nacionalista candidate but lost. He tried again in 1950 and won, but was briefly imprisoned shortly afterwards after a defamation case was filed against him. He served as governor until 1955, when he was elected to the Philippine Senate, serving in that position until losing his reelection bid 1961. As a senator, he was one of three members of the body who opposed the passage of the Rizal Law, along with Mariano Jesús Cuenco and Soc Rodrigo.

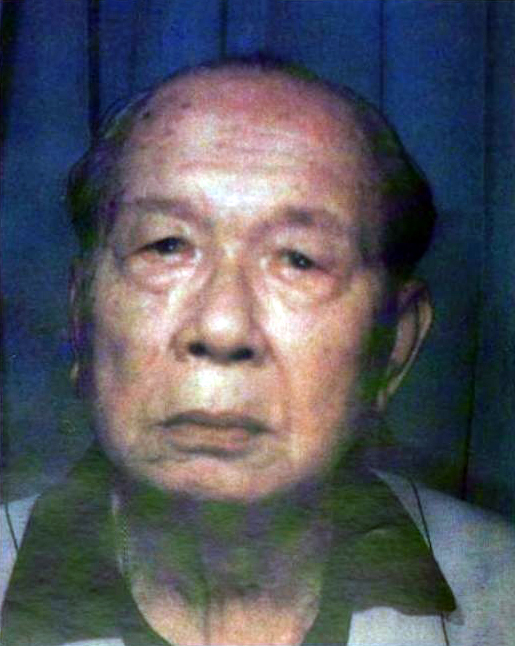
Rosales from the Official Directory of the Constitutional Commission, c. 1986

Rosales was later elected as a delegate to the Philippine Constitutional Convention of 1971 and was also appointed by President Corazon Aquino to become a member of the Philippine Constitutional Commission of 1986 that drafted the current Constitution of the Philippines enacted in 1987.

== Personal life and death ==
Rosales was married to Rosita Sepulveda and had two children. His older brother Julio Rosales was a senior clergyman in the Roman Catholic Church who rose to become a cardinal and Archbishop of Cebu.

He died on January 23, 1987 in Tacloban.
