= Region VIII's at-large parliamentary district =

Former Philippine parliamentary district

- Former constituency for the Interim Batasang Pambansa

Former constituency
- Created: 1978
- Abolished: 1984
- Seats: 10

Region VIII's at-large parliamentary district (also known as Eastern Visayas's at-large parliamentary district) was a constituency for the Interim Batasang Pambansa, the legislature of the Philippines from 1978 to 1984. It encompassed the provinces of Eastern Samar, Leyte, Northern Samar, Samar, and Southern Leyte, together with the cities of Calbayog, Ormoc, and Tacloban.

The district had 10 seats in the assembly, all of which were held by members of the ruling party Kilusang Bagong Lipunan.

== List of assemblymen representing the district ==
=== Batasang Pambansa (1978–1986) ===
Portrait	Member (Lifespan) (Province/City)	Term of office	Party	Legislature	Electoral history	Constituencies
District established February 7, 1978.
	Damian Aldaba (1917–2000) (Leyte)	June 12, 1978 – June 30, 1984	KBL	Interim Batasang Pambansa	Elected in 1978.	1978–1984; Provinces: Eastern Samar, Leyte, Northern Samar, Samar, Southern Leyte Cities: Calbayog, Ormoc, Tacloban
	Victor Amasa (1918–1998) (Samar)	June 12, 1978 – June 30, 1984	KBL	Interim Batasang Pambansa	Elected in 1978.	1978–1984; Provinces: Eastern Samar, Leyte, Northern Samar, Samar, Southern Leyte Cities: Calbayog, Ormoc, Tacloban
	Edilberto del Valle (Northern Samar)	June 12, 1978 – June 30, 1984	KBL	Interim Batasang Pambansa	Elected in 1978.	1978–1984; Provinces: Eastern Samar, Leyte, Northern Samar, Samar, Southern Leyte Cities: Calbayog, Ormoc, Tacloban
	Artemio Mate (Tacloban City)	June 12, 1978 – June 30, 1984	KBL	Interim Batasang Pambansa	Elected in 1978.	1978–1984; Provinces: Eastern Samar, Leyte, Northern Samar, Samar, Southern Leyte Cities: Calbayog, Ormoc, Tacloban
	Emiliano Melgazo (Leyte)	June 12, 1978 – June 30, 1984	KBL	Interim Batasang Pambansa	Elected in 1978.	1978–1984; Provinces: Eastern Samar, Leyte, Northern Samar, Samar, Southern Leyte Cities: Calbayog, Ormoc, Tacloban
	Benjamin Romualdez (1930–2012) (Tacloban City)	June 12, 1978 – June 30, 1984	KBL	Interim Batasang Pambansa	Elected in 1978.	1978–1984; Provinces: Eastern Samar, Leyte, Northern Samar, Samar, Southern Leyte Cities: Calbayog, Ormoc, Tacloban
	Jose Roño (1923–2002) (Calbayog City)	June 12, 1978 – June 30, 1984	KBL	Interim Batasang Pambansa	Elected in 1978.	1978–1984; Provinces: Eastern Samar, Leyte, Northern Samar, Samar, Southern Leyte Cities: Calbayog, Ormoc, Tacloban
	Alberto Veloso (1929–2002) (Leyte)	June 12, 1978 – June 30, 1984	KBL	Interim Batasang Pambansa	Elected in 1978.	1978–1984; Provinces: Eastern Samar, Leyte, Northern Samar, Samar, Southern Leyte Cities: Calbayog, Ormoc, Tacloban
	Fernando Veloso (1918–1998) (Leyte)	June 12, 1978 – June 30, 1984	KBL	Interim Batasang Pambansa	Elected in 1978.	1978–1984; Provinces: Eastern Samar, Leyte, Northern Samar, Samar, Southern Leyte Cities: Calbayog, Ormoc, Tacloban
	Nicanor Yñiguez (1915–2007) (Southern Leyte)	June 12, 1978 – June 30, 1984	KBL	Interim Batasang Pambansa	Elected in 1978.	1978–1984; Provinces: Eastern Samar, Leyte, Northern Samar, Samar, Southern Leyte Cities: Calbayog, Ormoc, Tacloban
District dissolved into Eastern Samar's at-large, Leyte's at-large, Northern Samar's at-large, Samar's at-large, and Southern Leyte's at-large districts.

== Election results ==
=== 1978 ===
Candidate	Party	Votes	%
Benjamin Romualdez	KBL	810,614	16.15
Jose Roño	KBL	481,489	9.59
Alberto Veloso	KBL	418,156	8.33
Fernando Veloso	KBL	412,904	8.23
Artemio Mate	KBL	409,822	8.16
Victor Amasa	KBL	393,642	7.84
Edilberto del Valle	KBL	375,249	7.48
Nicanor Yñiguez	KBL	373,034	7.43
Emiliano Melgazo	KBL	356,068	7.09
Damian Aldaba	KBL	353,559	7.04
Terencio Tupaz	Independent	206,257	4.11
Julio Cabaluna	Independent	200,043	3.99
Agustin Arnaiz	Independent	126,924	2.53
Virgilio Alicer	Independent	41,208	0.82
Alejandro Faelnar	Independent	33,179	0.66
Claro Gofredo	Partido ng Bagong Pilipino	14,262	0.28
Usualdo Laguitan	Partido ng Bagong Pilipino	13,075	0.26
Total		5,019,485	100.00
Total votes		998,451	–
Registered voters/turnout		1,128,661	88.46
