= Governor of Samar =

Local chief executive

- Gobernador han Lalawigan han Samar Waray
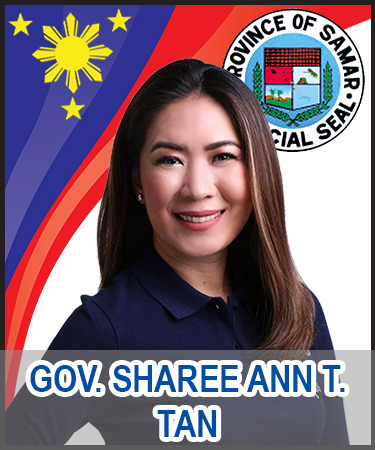
- Incumbent; Sharee Ann Tan since June 30, 2022
- Style: Governor, Honorable Governor
- Seat: Samar Provincial Capitol, Catbalogan
- Term length: up to 2022 (substitute); Election 3 Terms 3 years each (elected)
- Inaugural holder: Julio Llorente
- Formation: 1768 (Separation from the former Province of Samar and Leyte); 1965 (Partition into 3 Provinces)

The governor of Samar is the local chief executive of the Philippine province of Samar, which was previously known as Western Samar from 1965 to 1969. Prior to 1965, the governor also served as the chief executive of the old province of Samar, which was divided into three separate provinces that year.

== List ==
Order	Image	Name	Year in Office	Notes
Governor of Samar
1		Julio Llorente	1902 – 1903	First appointed governor of Samar
2		Segundo Singzon	1903 – 1904	Second appointed governor of Samar from Cebu
3		George Curry	1905 – 1907	First American governor of Samar
4		Maximo Cinco	1908 – 1910	First elected governor of Samar
5		Vicente Jasmines	1910 – 1916	
6		Clodualdo Lucero	1916 – 1922	
7		Juan Sulse	1922 – 1931	
8		Felipe Abrigo	1932 – 1934, 1937 – 1940	
9		Cayetano Lucero	1940 – 1944	
10		Vicente Dira	1944 – 1945	Japanese Appointee
11		Gerardo Morrero	1945 – 1946	
12		Baltazar Avelino	1946 – 1950	
13		Decoroso Rosales	1950 – 1955	
14		Fernando Veloso	1955 – 1960	
15		Vicente Valley	1960 – 1963	
16		Esteban Piczon	1963 – 1965	
Governor of Western Samar
16		Esteban Piczon	1965 – 1967	First governor of Western Samar (modern-day Samar) since its establishment as a result of the division of Samar
17		Jose "Peping" A. Roño	1967 – 1969	
Governor of Samar
17		Jose "Peping" A. Roño	1969 – 1973	
18		Pablo Cinco	1973 – 1976	
19		Tomas O. Ricalde	1976 – 1986	
20		Antonio M. Bolastig	1986 – 1995	
(17)		Jose "Peping" A. Roño	1995 – 2001	
21		Milagrosa T. Tan	2001 – 2010	First Female Governor
22		Sharee Ann Tan	2010 – 2019	Youngest Elected Governor
(21)		Milagrosa T. Tan	2019	Died in Office
23		Reynolds Michael T. Tan	2019 – 2022	
(22)		Sharee Ann Tan	2022 – incumbent	
