= Majority Floor Leader of the House of Representatives of the Philippines =

Political position

- Lider ng Mayorya ng Kapulungan ng mga Kinatawan ng Pilipinas
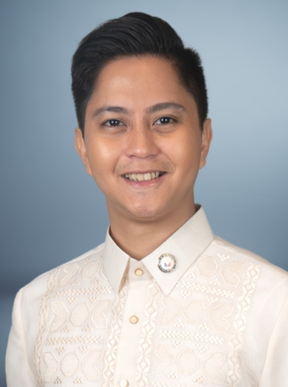
- Incumbent; Sandro Marcos since July 28, 2025
- Style: The Honorable
- Appointer: Elected by the majority bloc of the House of Representatives of the Philippines
- Inaugural holder: Manuel L. Quezon
- Website: House of Representatives of the Philippines

The majority floor leader of the House of Representatives of the Philippines (Filipino: Lider ng Mayorya ng Kapulungan ng mga Kinatawan ng Pilipinas), or simply the House majority floor leader, is the leader elected by the majority bloc of the House of Representatives of the Philippines that serves as their official leader in the body. He also manages the business of the majority part in the House of Representatives. By tradition, the speaker or any presiding officer gives the majority leader priority in obtaining the floor and also, he is the traditional chairman of the Committee on Rules.

== History ==
On October 16, 1907, at the inaugural session of the Philippine Assembly in the 1st Legislature, Manuel L. Quezon was elected as the chamber's floor leader, after he nominated Sergio Osmeña for the position of speaker. Following Quezon's election as junior resident commissioner of the Philippines to the United States in 1909, Alberto Barreto became the Assembly's new floor leader.

After the bicameral Congress was first abolished in 1935, José E. Romero was elected floor leader of the 1st National Assembly. He was succeeded by Quintín Paredes in the 2nd Assembly, wherein the Nacionalista Party held all of the seats. The Japanese-sponsored National Assembly of the Second Republic elected Bacolod representative Francisco Zulueta as floor leader of the all-KALIBAPI chamber.

Following the liberation of the Philippines in 1945 and the reestablishment of Congress, Eugenio Pérez was elected floor leader of the 1st Commonwealth Congress. During the 1st and 2nd Congresses, Raul Leuterio served as House majority leader after the newly established Liberal Party won a majority of the seats. The Nacionalistas regained their majority in the House in the 3rd Congress, and elected Arturo Tolentino as majority leader.

The imposition of martial law by President Ferdinand Marcos in 1972 and the subsequent ratification of the 1973 Constitution abolished Congress for a second time. In 1978, a new parliament known as the Batasang Pambansa was established, and Jose Roño served as its floor leader until 1986, when the People Power Revolution resulted in Marcos's ouster and the adoption of a new Constitution.

Following the 1987 elections, which gave members of the Lakas ng Bayan coalition a majority in both the Senate and the House of Representatives, Francisco Sumulong served as majority leader in the 8th Congress under the speakership of Ramon Mitra Jr. Ronaldo Zamora later served as majority leader from July 29, 1992, the day after the election of Jose de Venecia Jr. as speaker, until his resignation at the opening session of the 10th Congress on July 26, 1995, following his departure from the ruling Lakas–NUCD party. He was succeeded by former House Minority Leader Rodolfo Albano.

On July 23, 2018, Fredenil Castro was designated acting majority leader during the session that elected Gloria Macapagal Arroyo as the first female speaker, unseating incumbent Pantaleon Alvarez. A week later on July 30, Rolando Andaya Jr. was elected to formally replace former majority leader Rodolfo Fariñas as chairperson of the Committee on Rules. Andaya stepped down on January 21, 2019, and was succeeded by Castro for a second tenure as majority leader.

At the opening of the 18th Congress on July 22, 2019, Martin Romualdez was elected majority leader under the speakership of Alan Peter Cayetano. He continued to serve in the position after withdrawing support from Cayetano and backing Lord Allan Velasco as the new speaker amid a leadership dispute. Upon Romualdez's election as speaker at the opening of the 19th Congress, Mannix Dalipe was elected majority leader. He was succeeded in the 20th Congress by Sandro Marcos, son of President Bongbong Marcos and the youngest representative in history to hold the position.

== List of majority floor leaders ==
This list also includes the majority floor leaders of the Philippine Assembly (1907–1916), the Commonwealth National Assembly (1935–1941), the Second Republic National Assembly (1943–1944), and the Batasang Pambansa (1978–1986).

=== Philippine Assembly (1907–1916) ===
No.	Portrait	Name (Birth–Death)	Term of office		Party	Legislature
No.	Portrait	Name (Birth–Death)	Took office	Left office	Party	Legislature
1		Manuel L. Quezon; Member for Tayabas–1st (1878–1944)	1907	1909	Nacionalista	1st Legislature
2		Alberto Barretto; Member for Zambales–Lone (1867–1951)	1910	1912	Nacionalista	2nd Legislature
3		Macario Adriatico; Member for Mindoro–Lone (1869–1919)	1912	1914	Nacionalista	3rd Legislature
4		Galicano Apacible; Member for Batangas–1st (1864–1949)	1914	1916	Nacionalista	3rd Legislature

=== House of Representatives (1916–1935) ===
No.	Portrait	Name (Birth–Death)	Term of office		Party	Legislature
No.	Portrait	Name (Birth–Death)	Took office	Left office	Party	Legislature
5		Rafael Alunan Sr. Member for Negros Occidental–2nd (1885–1947)	1916	1922	Nacionalista	4th Legislature
5		Rafael Alunan Sr. Member for Negros Occidental–2nd (1885–1947)	1916	1922	Nacionalista	5th Legislature
6		Benigno Aquino Sr. Member for Tarlac–2nd (1894–1947)	1922	1928	Nacionalista Unipersonalista (until 1925)	6th Legislature
6		Benigno Aquino Sr. Member for Tarlac–2nd (1894–1947)	1922	1928	Nacionalista Consolidado (from 1925)	7th Legislature
7		Manuel Briones; Member for Cebu–1st (1893–1957)	1928	1933	Nacionalista Consolidado	8th Legislature
7		Manuel Briones; Member for Cebu–1st (1893–1957)	1928	1933	Nacionalista Consolidado	9th Legislature
8		Pedro Sabido; Member for Albay–3rd (1894–1980)	1933	1933	Nacionalista Consolidado	9th Legislature
9		Francisco Varona; Member for Manila–1st (1891–1941)	1934	1934	Nacionalista Consolidado	9th Legislature
10		José E. Romero; Member for Negros Oriental–2nd (1897–1978)	1934	1935	Nacionalista Democratico	10th Legislature

=== National Assembly (1935–1944) ===
No.	Portrait	Name (Birth–Death)	Term of office		Party	Legislature
No.	Portrait	Name (Birth–Death)	Took office	Left office	Party	Legislature
(10)		José E. Romero; Member for Negros Oriental–2nd (1897–1978)	November 25, 1935	December 30, 1938	Nacionalista Democratico	1st National Assembly
11		Quintín Paredes; Member for Abra–Lone (1884–1973)	January 24, 1939	December 30, 1941	Nacionalista	2nd National Assembly
12		Francisco Zulueta; Member for Bacolod (1891–1947)	September 25, 1943	February 2, 1944	KALIBAPI	National Assembly (Second Republic)

=== House of Representatives (1945–1973) ===
No.	Portrait	Name (Birth–Death)	Term of office		Party	Legislature
No.	Portrait	Name (Birth–Death)	Took office	Left office	Party	Legislature
13		Eugenio Pérez; Member for Pangasinan–2nd (1896–1957)	June 9, 1945	May 25, 1946	Nacionalista	1st Commonwealth Congress
14		Raul Leuterio; Member for Mindoro–Lone (until 1952) and Oriental Mindoro–Lone (from 1952) (1904–1970)	May 25, 1946	December 30, 1953	Liberal	2nd Commonwealth Congress
14		Raul Leuterio; Member for Mindoro–Lone (until 1952) and Oriental Mindoro–Lone (from 1952) (1904–1970)	May 25, 1946	December 30, 1953	Liberal	1st Congress
14		Raul Leuterio; Member for Mindoro–Lone (until 1952) and Oriental Mindoro–Lone (from 1952) (1904–1970)	May 25, 1946	December 30, 1953	Liberal	2nd Congress
15		Arturo Tolentino; Member for Manila–3rd (1910–2004)	January 25, 1954	December 30, 1957	Nacionalista	3rd Congress
16		Jose Aldeguer; Member for Iloilo–5th (1908–1991)	January 27, 1958	December 30, 1961	Nacionalista	4th Congress
17		Justiniano Montano; Member for Cavite–Lone (1905–2005)	January 22, 1962	February 2, 1967	Nacionalista	5th Congress
17		Justiniano Montano; Member for Cavite–Lone (1905–2005)	January 22, 1962	February 2, 1967	Nacionalista	6th Congress
18		Marcelino Veloso; Member for Leyte–3rd (1919–1986)	February 2, 1967	January 17, 1973	Nacionalista	6th Congress
18		Marcelino Veloso; Member for Leyte–3rd (1919–1986)	February 2, 1967	January 17, 1973	Nacionalista	7th Congress

=== Batasang Pambansa (1978–1986) ===
No.	Portrait	Name (Birth–Death)	Term of office		Party	Legislature
No.	Portrait	Name (Birth–Death)	Took office	Left office	Party	Legislature
19		Jose Roño; Member for Region VIII (until 1984) and Samar (from 1984) (1923–2002)	June 12, 1978	March 25, 1986	KBL	Interim Batasang Pambansa
19		Jose Roño; Member for Region VIII (until 1984) and Samar (from 1984) (1923–2002)	June 12, 1978	March 25, 1986	KBL	Regular Batasang Pambansa

=== House of Representatives (1987–present) ===
No.	Portrait	Name (Birth–Death)	Term of office		Party	Legislature
No.	Portrait	Name (Birth–Death)	Took office	Left office	Party	Legislature
20		Francisco Sumulong; Member for Rizal–1st (1928–2000)	July 23, 1987	June 30, 1992	PDP–Laban (until 1988)	8th Congress
20		Francisco Sumulong; Member for Rizal–1st (1928–2000)	July 23, 1987	June 30, 1992	LDP (from 1988)	8th Congress
21		Ronaldo Zamora; Member for San Juan–Mandaluyong–Lone (born 1944)	July 27, 1992	June 30, 1995	LDP	9th Congress
22		Rodolfo Albano Jr. Member for Isabela–1st (1934–2019)	July 24, 1995	June 30, 1998	NPC	10th Congress
23		Mar Roxas; Member for Capiz–1st (born 1957)	July 27, 1998	January 17, 2000	Liberal	11th Congress
24		Eduardo Gullas; Member for Cebu–1st (1930–2025)	January 17, 2000	November 13, 2000	LAMMP	11th Congress
25		Bella Angara; Member for Aurora–Lone (born 1939)	November 13, 2000	January 24, 2001	LDP	11th Congress
26		Sergio Apostol; Member for Leyte–2nd (born 1935)	January 24, 2001	June 30, 2001	Lakas	11th Congress
27		Neptali Gonzales II; Member for Mandaluyong–Lone (born 1964)	July 23, 2001	June 30, 2004	Lakas	12th Congress
28		Prospero Nograles; Member for Davao City–1st (1947–2019)	July 26, 2004	June 30, 2007	Lakas	13th Congress
29		Arthur Defensor Sr. Member for Iloilo–3rd (born 1941)	July 23, 2007	June 30, 2010	Lakas	14th Congress
30		Neptali Gonzales II; Member for Mandaluyong–Lone (born 1964)	July 26, 2010	June 30, 2016	Liberal	15th Congress
30		Neptali Gonzales II; Member for Mandaluyong–Lone (born 1964)	July 26, 2010	June 30, 2016	Liberal	16th Congress
31		Rodolfo Fariñas; Member for Ilocos Norte–1st (born 1951)	July 25, 2016	July 23, 2018	PDP–Laban	17th Congress
—		Fredenil Castro; Member for Capiz–2nd (born 1951); Acting	July 23, 2018	July 30, 2018	NUP	17th Congress
32		Rolando Andaya Jr. Member for Camarines Sur–1st (1969–2022)	July 30, 2018	January 21, 2019	NPC	17th Congress
33		Fredenil Castro; Member for Capiz–2nd (born 1951)	January 21, 2019	June 30, 2019	NUP	17th Congress
34		Martin Romualdez; Member for Leyte–1st (born 1963)	July 22, 2019	June 30, 2022	Lakas	18th Congress
35		Mannix Dalipe; Member for Zamboanga City–2nd (born 1973)	July 25, 2022	June 30, 2025	Lakas	19th Congress
36		Sandro Marcos; Member for Ilocos Norte–1st (born 1994)	July 28, 2025	Incumbent	PFP (until 2026)	20th Congress
36		Sandro Marcos; Member for Ilocos Norte–1st (born 1994)	July 28, 2025	Incumbent	Lakas (from 2026)	20th Congress

== See also ==
- Minority Floor Leader of the House of Representatives of the Philippines
