= 1976 Philippine martial law referendum and constitutional plebiscite =

October 16–17, 1976

Continuation of martial law
For	90.05%
Against	7.86%
Abstain	2.09%

Approval of constitutional amendments
For	87.58%
Against	9.60%
Abstain	2.82%

A national referendum-plebiscite was held on October 16–17, 1976 in the Philippines in which the majority of the barangay voters approved the continuation of martial law and ratified the proposed amendments to the Constitution substituting the Regular Batasang Pambansa with the Interim Batasang Pambansa, pursuant to Presidential Decrees Nos. 991, 1031, and 1032.

== Background ==
For purposes of Philippine law, a ballot question on amending, revising or approving a constitution is a plebiscite; other ballot questions asked through a nationwide electorate are referendums:

=== Referendum ===
There was a referendum if voters are in favor of extending martial law.

=== Constitutional plebiscite ===
This was a constitutional plebiscite for approving amendments to the constitution:

1. Replacing the Interim National Assembly with the Interim Batasang Pambansa of not more than 120 members unless otherwise provided by law, elected regionally and by sector, and includes the president.
2. The Interim Batasang Pambansa, unlike the Interim National Assembly, will not have the power to approve treaties.
3. The incumbent president will convene and preside over the Interim Batasang Pambansa until a speaker is elected.
4. The president (prime minister) and cabinet shall exercise all powers and functions, and can only be disqualified based on what the president (prime minister) prescribes. The president (prime minister) can also appoint a deputy prime minister, or multiple deputy prime ministers.
5. The incumbent president exercised legislative powers until martial law is lifted.
6. The president (prime minister) can issue decrees, orders or letters of instruction if the Interim Batasang Pambansa or regular National Assembly fails to act on an emergency
7. The barangays and sanggunians shall continue as presently constituted but their functions, powers, and composition may be altered by law.
8. All provisions of this Constitution not inconsistent with any of these amendments shall continue in full force and effect.
9. These amendments shall take effect after the incumbent President shall have proclaimed that they have been ratified by a majority of the votes cast in the referendum-Plebiscite.

== Results ==
=== On extending martial law ===
Do you want martial law to be continued?
Choice	Votes	%
Yes	21,378,895	90.05
No	1,867,326	7.86
Abstain	493,886	2.09
Total votes	23,740,107	100.00

Question #1 of the 1976 Philippine constitutional referendum results (excluding invalid votes)
Yes; 21,378,895 (92%)
▲50%

=== On approving amendments to the constitution ===
Do you approve of the constitutional amendments (stated in Presidential Decree No. 1033, s. 1976)?
Choice	Votes	%
Yes	20,791,888	87.58
No	2,279,285	9.60
Abstain	668,934	2.82
Total votes	23,740,107	100.00

Question #2 of the 1976 Philippine constitutional referendum results (excluding invalid votes)
Yes; 20,791,888 (90.1%)
▲50%

== Aftermath ==
In 1977, another referendum asked the people if President Marcos should continue as president after the organization of the Interim Batasang Pambansa.

In 1978, a parliamentary election was held, the first in almost 7 years. The election led to the organization of the Interim Batasang Pambansa.

== See also ==
- Commission on Elections
- Politics of the Philippines
- Philippine elections
