= Samar's at-large congressional district =

Legislative district of the Philippines

Samar's at-large congressional district was the provincewide electoral district for Philippine national legislatures in both the undivided province of Samar before its 1965 partition and the western third that adopted its name which was created as a result of that division from 1965 to 1986.

Samar first elected its representatives at-large in the 1943 Philippine legislative election for a seat in the National Assembly of the Second Philippine Republic. Before 1943, the undivided island province was represented in the national legislatures through its first, second and third districts. The former province was also earlier represented in the Malolos Congress of the First Philippine Republic in 1898 by appointed delegates from Luzon.

The three districts were restored in Samar ahead of the 1941 Philippine House of Representatives elections whose elected representatives only began to serve following the dissolution of the Second Republic and the restoration of the Philippine Commonwealth in 1945. An at-large district would not be used in the province until after the 1965 division that created three new provinces with three separate lone congressional districts based more or less on the existing districts, and one of which, Western Samar, adopted the name of Samar in 1969. The successor province elected its representative in this manner in the 1969 Philippine House of Representatives elections. The district was immediately dissolved due to absence of a national legislature from 1972 to 1978. It was last recreated for the 1984 Philippine parliamentary election and became obsolete following the 1987 reapportionment under a new constitution.

== Representation history ==
#	Term of office		National Assembly	Seat A				Seat B				Seat C			
#	Start	End	National Assembly	Image	Member	Party	Electoral history	Image	Member	Party	Electoral history	Image	Member	Party	Electoral history
=== Samar's at-large district for the Malolos Congress ===
District created June 18, 1898.
–	September 15, 1898	March 23, 1901	1st		Servillano Aquino	Nonpartisan	Appointed.		Javier Gonzales Salvador	Nonpartisan	Appointed.		Juan Tongco	Nonpartisan	Appointed.
#	Term of office		National Assembly	Seat A				Seat B				Seats eliminated			
#	Start	End	National Assembly	Image	Member	Party	Electoral history	Image	Member	Party	Electoral history	Seats eliminated			
=== Samar's at-large district for the National Assembly (Second Philippine Republic) ===												Seats eliminated			
District re-created September 7, 1943.												Seats eliminated			
–	September 25, 1943	February 2, 1944	1st		Serafín Marabut	KALIBAPI	Elected in 1943.		Cayetano Lucero	KALIBAPI	Appointed as an ex officio member.	Seats eliminated			
District dissolved into Samar's 1st, 2nd and 3rd districts.												Seats eliminated			
#	Term of office		Congress	Single seat				Seats eliminated				Seats eliminated			
#	Start	End	Congress	Image	Member	Party	Electoral history	Seats eliminated				Seats eliminated			
=== Western Samar's at-large district for the House of Representatives of the Philippines ===								Seats eliminated				Seats eliminated			
District re-created June 19, 1965.								Seats eliminated				Seats eliminated			
1	December 30, 1965	December 30, 1969	6th		Fernando Veloso	Nacionalista	Redistricted from Samar's 2nd district and re-elected in 1965.	Seats eliminated				Seats eliminated			
=== Samar's at-large district for the House of Representatives of the Philippines ===								Seats eliminated				Seats eliminated			
(1)	December 30, 1969	September 23, 1972	7th		Fernando Veloso	Nacionalista	Re-elected in 1969. Removed from office after imposition of martial law.	Seats eliminated				Seats eliminated			
District dissolved into the ten-seat Region VIII's at-large district for the Interim Batasang Pambansa.								Seats eliminated				Seats eliminated			
#	Term of office		Batasang Pambansa	Seat A				Seat B				Seats eliminated			
#	Start	End	Batasang Pambansa	Image	Member	Party	Electoral history	Image	Member	Party	Electoral history	Seats eliminated			
=== Samar's at-large district for the Regular Batasang Pambansa ===												Seats eliminated			
District re-created February 1, 1984.												Seats eliminated			
–	July 23, 1984	March 25, 1986	2nd		Jose Roño	KBL	Elected in 1984.		Fernando Veloso	KBL	Elected in 1984.	Seats eliminated			
District dissolved into Samar's 1st and 2nd districts.												Seats eliminated			

== See also ==
- Legislative districts of Samar
