= Batasang Pambansa (legislature) =

Philippine legislature from 1978 to 1986

- Philippines
- The seal of the Batasang Pambansa from 1978 to 1986, during which the Philippines had a unicameral legislature

Type
- Type: Unicameral

History
- Established: October 16–17, 1976
- Disbanded: February 2, 1987
- Preceded by: Congress of the Philippines (pre-1972); Batasang Bayan (de facto); Interim National Assembly (de jure)
- Succeeded by: Congress of the Philippines

Leadership
- Speaker of the Batasan: Querube Makalintal (Region IV, KBL) (1978–1984); Nicanor Yñiguez (Southern Leyte, KBL) (1984–1986)
- Speaker pro tempore: Blah T. Sinsuat (Region XII, KBL) (1978–1984); Salipada Pendatun (Maguindanao, KBL) (1984–January 27, 1985); Macacuna Dimaporo (Lanao del Sur, KBL) (from March 13, 1985–1986)
- Majority Floor Leader: Jose Roño (Region VIII; Samar, KBL) (1978–1986)
- Minority Floor Leader: Hilario Davide Jr. (Region VII, Pusyon Bisaya) (1978–1984); Jose Laurel Jr. (Batangas, UNIDO) (1984–1986)

Structure
- Seats: 179 members (1978); elected 200 members (1984); elected
- Length of term: 6 years
- Authority: Article III, 1973 Constitution of the Philippines

Elections
- Voting system: First-past-the-post voting

Meeting place
- Batasang Pambansa Complex, Batasan Hills, Quezon City

The Batasang Pambansa (lit. 'National Legislature'), often referred to simply as the Batasan, was the legislature of the Philippines, established first as an interim assembly in 1978 and later as a regular legislature in 1984. It was the fourth unicameral legislature in Philippine history. Members of the Batasang Pambansa were known as Mambabatas Pambansa (MP; lit. 'national lawmaker'), equivalent to a member of parliament.

The Batasan was established under the 1973 Constitution promulgated during the presidency of Ferdinand Marcos, replacing the Congress of the Philippines established under the 1935 Constitution. It was abolished following the People Power Revolution in 1986, and Congress was restored under the 1987 Constitution.

== History ==
The original provisions of the 1973 Constitution, which was ratified on January 17, 1973, provided for the establishment of a unicameral National Assembly. Upon its ratification, an Interim National Assembly composed of the president and the vice president, those who served as president of the 1971 Constitutional Convention, members of the Senate and the House of Representatives, and the delegates to the 1971 Constitutional Convention, was established and functioned as the legislature. Before the Regular Batasang Pambansa convened, a 120-member interim body served as the national legislature. The body was composed of the incumbent president, representatives elected from different regions and from different sectors, and select Cabinet officials appointed by the president. In 1981, the semi-parliamentary legislature was formally convened as the Batasang Pambansa, and in 1985, some dissident members unsuccessfully tried to impeach President Marcos.

On March 25, 1986, Proclamation No. 3, commonly known as the 1986 Freedom Constitution, was promulgated, effectively abolishing the Batasang Pambansa.

== See also ==
- Interim Batasang Pambansa (1978–1984)
- Regular Batasang Pambansa (1984–1986)
