= Interim Batasang Pambansa =

26th legislative term of the Philippines

←	7th Congress	Regular Batasang Pambansa	→
- Batasang Pambansa Complex (2010)

Overview
- Term: June 12, 1978 – June 5, 1984
- President: Ferdinand Marcos
- Prime Minister: Ferdinand Marcos (until June 30, 1981); Cesar Virata (from July 28, 1981)
- Deputy Prime Minister: Cesar Virata (until July 28, 1981); Jose Roño (from July 28, 1981)

Batasang Pambansa
- Members: 189
- Speaker: Querube Makalintal (from July 31, 1978)
- Speaker pro tempore: Blah T. Sinsuat (from November 10, 1981)
- Majority leader: Jose Roño
- Minority leader: Hilario Davide Jr.

The Interim Batasang Pambansa (IBP; English: Interim National Assembly) was the national legislature of the Philippines from June 12, 1978, until June 5, 1984. Established under the 1973 Constitution, it served as a transitional legislative body during the country's shift from a presidential to a parliamentary-oriented system of government.

The IBP was preceded by the Interim National Assembly, a de jure legislative body provided for in the original text of the 1973 Constitution. However, it was never convened and was effectively superseded by a series of nine constitutional amendments ratified in a referendum-plebiscite held on October 16–17, 1976.

== Sessions ==
- First Regular Session: June 12, 1978 – June 6, 1979
- Second Regular Session: July 23, 1979 – June 11, 1980
- Third Regular Session: July 28, 1980 – April 28, 1981
- Fourth Regular Session: July 27, 1981 – June 1, 1982
- Fifth Regular Session: July 26, 1982 – April 14, 1983
- Sixth Regular Session: July 25, 1983 – June 5, 1984

== Leadership ==
Speaker of the Batasang Pambansa

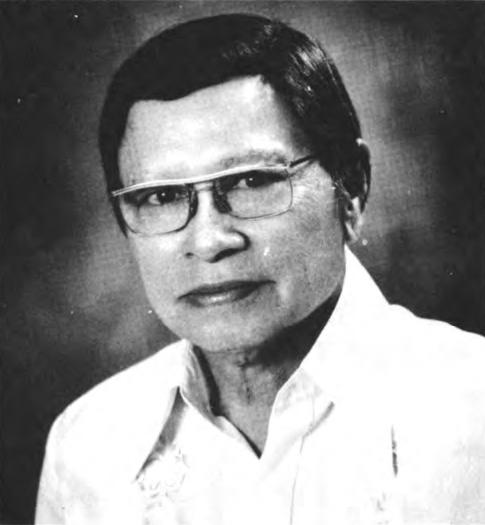
Querube Makalintal

- President: Ferdinand Marcos (KBL)
- Prime Minister:
  - Ferdinand Marcos (KBL), until June 30, 1981
  - Cesar Virata (KBL), from July 28, 1981
- Deputy Prime Minister:
  - Cesar Virata (KBL), until July 28, 1981
  - Jose Roño (Region VIII, KBL), from July 28, 1981
- Speaker: Querube Makalintal (Region IV, KBL), from July 31, 1978
- Speaker pro tempore: Blah T. Sinsuat (Region XII, KBL), from November 10, 1981
- Majority leader: Jose Roño (Region VIII, KBL)
- Minority leader: Hilario Davide Jr. (Region VII, Pusyon Bisaya)

== Legislation ==
The Interim Batasang Pambansa passed a total of 702 laws.

=== Major legislation ===
- Batas Pambansa Blg. 1 — General Appropriations Act of 1978
- Batas Pambansa Blg. 2 — Repeal of Presidential Decree No. 31 and the Consolidation of Taxes of Hotels, Motels and Other Establishments
- Batas Pambansa Blg. 3 — National Internal Revenue Code Amendment
- Batas Pambansa Blg. 6 — Reduction of the Penalty for Illegal Possession of Bladed, Pointed or Blunt Weapons
- Batas Pambansa Blg. 8 — Definition and Implementation of the metric system and instituted the Modern Philippine Standard Time
- Batas Pambansa Blg. 22 — The Anti-Bouncing Check Law
- Batas Pambansa Blg. 42 — Amending the PCSO Charter
- Batas Pambansa Blg. 54 — Setting the date of January 30, 1980 as the date for a plebiscite to ratify the 1976 Amendments to the 1973 Constitution of the Philippines
- Batas Pambansa Blg. 61 — General Banking Act
- Batas Pambansa Blg. 62 — Savings and Loan Association Act
- Batas Pambansa Blg. 63 — Private Development Banks Act
- Batas Pambansa Blg. 64 — Amending the DBP Charter
- Batas Pambansa Blg. 65 — Amending the Rural Banks Act
- Batas Pambansa Blg. 66 — Amending the Investment House Law
- Batas Pambansa Blg. 67 — Amending the Central Bank Act
- Batas Pambansa Blg. 68 — The Corporation Code
- Batas Pambansa Blg. 70 — Amending the Labor Code
- Batas Pambansa Blg. 71 — Amending the Revised Penal Code
- Batas Pambansa Blg. 72 — National Census Act of 1980
- Batas Pambansa Blg. 73 — Energy Conservation Act of 1980
- Batas Pambansa Blg. 74 — Amending the Land Transportation and Traffic Code
- Batas Pambansa Blg. 76 — Amending the Probation Law of 1976
- Batas Pambansa Blg. 79 — Creation of the Commission on Filipinos Overseas
- Batas Pambansa Blg. 122 — Setting the date of April 7, 1981 as the date for a plebiscite to ratify the 1981 Amendments to the 1973 Constitution of the Philippines
- Batas Pambansa Blg. 222 — Barangay Election Act of 1982

== Members ==
Final composition of the Interim Batasang Pambansa.

Region/Sector	Member	Party
President	Ferdinand Marcos (Note: Ferdinand Marcos was a member of the Batasang Pambansa until June 30, 1981.)	KBL
Cabinet	Baltazar Aquino (Note: Baltazar Aquino was a member of the Batasang Pambansa until 1979.)	KBL
Cabinet	Romulo Espaldon	KBL
Cabinet	Clemente Gatmaitan (Note: Clemente Gatmaitan was a member of the Batasang Pambansa until 1979.)	KBL
Cabinet	Alfredo Juinio (Note: Alfredo Juinio was a member of the Batasang Pambansa until 1981.)	KBL
Cabinet	Jaime C. Laya (Note: Jaime C. Laya was a member of the Batasang Pambansa until 1981.)	KBL
Cabinet	Melecio Magno	KBL
Cabinet	Sylvia Montes	KBL
Cabinet	Juan Manuel (Note: Juan Miguel was a member of the Batasang Pambansa until 1979.)	KBL
Cabinet	Roberto Ongpin	KBL
Cabinet	Leonardo B. Perez	KBL
Cabinet	Troadio Quiazon Jr.	KBL
Cabinet	Gerardo Sicat (Note: Gerardo Sicat was a member of the Batasang Pambansa until 1981.)	KBL
Cabinet	Juan Tuvera	KBL
Cabinet	Geronimo Velasco	KBL
Cabinet	Cesar Virata	KBL
Cabinet	Onofre Corpuz (Note: Onofre Corpuz was a member of the Batasang Pambansa from 1979.)	KBL
Cabinet	Jose P. Dans, Jr. (Note: Jose Dans Jr. was a member of the Batasang Pambansa from 1979.)	KBL
Cabinet	Enrique Garcia (Note: Enrique Garcia was a member of the Batasang Pambansa from 1979 until 1981.)	KBL
Cabinet	Jesus Hipolito (Note: Jesus Hipolito was a member of the Batasang Pambansa from 1980.)	KBL
Cabinet	Manuel Alba (Note: Manuel Alba was a member of the Batasang Pambansa from 1981.)	KBL
Cabinet	Jesus C. Azurin (Note: Jesus C. Azurin was a member of the Batasang Pambansa from 1981.)	KBL
Cabinet	Placido Mapa Jr. (Note: Placido Mapa Jr. was a member of the Batasang Pambansa from 1981 until 1983.)	KBL
Cabinet	Vicente Valdepeñas Jr. (Note: Vicente Valdepeñas Jr. was a member of the Batasang Pambansa from 1984.)	KBL
Region I (Note: Provinces: Abra, Benguet, Ilocos Norte, Ilocos Sur, La Union, Mountain Province, Pangasinan Cities: Baguio, Dagupan, Laoag, San Carlos (Pangasinan))	Jeremias Zapata	KBL
Region I	Andres Cosalan	KBL
Region I	Antonio Raquiza	KBL
Region I	Salacnib Baterina	KBL
Region I	Lucas Cauton	KBL
Region I	Jose Aspiras	KBL
Region I	Joaquin L. Ortega	KBL
Region I	Victor Dominguez	KBL
Region I	Roque de Guzman	KBL
Region I	Felipe de Vera	KBL
Region I	Conrado Estrella Sr.	KBL
Region I	Vicente Millora	KBL
Region I	Jeremias Montemayor	KBL
Region I	Antonio Villar	KBL
Region II (Note: Provinces: Apayao, Batanes, Cagayan, Ifugao, Isabela, Kalinga, Nueva Vizcaya, Quirino)	Simon Gato	KBL
Region II	Juan Ponce Enrile	KBL
Region II	Gualberto Lumauig	KBL
Region II	Rodolfo Albano Jr.	KBL
Region II	Prospero Bello	KBL
Region II	Rolando Puzon	KBL
Region II	Carlos Padilla	KBL
Region II	Benjamin Perez	KBL
Region III (Note: Provinces: Bataan, Bulacan, Nueva Ecija, Pampanga, Tarlac, Zambales Cities: Angeles, Cabanatuan, Olongapo, Palayan, San Jose)	Eller Torres	KBL
Region III	Antonino Roman	KBL
Region III	Felicita Bernardino (Note: Felicita Bernardino died on May 23, 1983.)	KBL
Region III	Teodulo Natividad	KBL
Region III	Blas Ople	KBL
Region III	Angel Concepcion	KBL
Region III	Leopoldo Diaz	KBL
Region III	Juan Liwag (Note: Juan Liwag died on November 30, 1983.)	KBL
Region III	Narciso Nario	KBL
Region III	Estelito Mendoza (Note: Estelito Mendoza resigned on January 30, 1980.)	KBL
Region III	Cicero Punzalan	KBL
Region III	Vicente Abad Santos (Note: Vicente Abad Santos resigned on January 17, 1979, upon being appointed as Associate Justice of the Supreme Court of the Philippines.)	KBL
Region III	Baldomero Mangiliman	KBL
Region III	Mercedes Teodoro	KBL
Region III	Amado Alinea	KBL
Region III	Vicente Magsaysay	KBL
National Capital Region (Note: Cities: Caloocan, Manila, Pasay, Quezon City Municipalities: Las Piñas, Makati, Malabon, Mandaluyong, Marikina, Muntinlupa, Navotas, Parañaque, Pasig, Pateros, San Juan, Taguig, Valenzuela)	Emilio Abello Sr. (Note: Emilio Abello Sr. died on May 18, 1982.)	KBL
National Capital Region	Estanislao Alinea Jr.	KBL
National Capital Region	Jose P. Bengzon	KBL
National Capital Region	Jose Conrado Benitez	KBL
National Capital Region	Manuel Camara	KBL
National Capital Region	Fred Elizalde	KBL
National Capital Region	Gerardo Espina Sr.	KBL
National Capital Region	Alejandro Fider	KBL
National Capital Region	Pablo Floro	KBL
National Capital Region	Eddie Ilarde	KBL
National Capital Region	Querube Makalintal	KBL
National Capital Region	Imelda Marcos	KBL
National Capital Region	Roberto Oca Jr.	KBL
National Capital Region	Vicente Paterno	KBL
National Capital Region	Waldo Perfecto (Note: Waldo Perfecto died on August 16, 1980.)	KBL
National Capital Region	Ricardo Puno	KBL
National Capital Region	Rogelio Quiambao	KBL
National Capital Region	Carlos P. Romulo	KBL
National Capital Region	Januario Soller Jr.	KBL
National Capital Region	Arturo Tolentino	KBL
National Capital Region	Ronaldo Zamora	KBL
Region IV-A (Note: Provinces: Batangas, Cavite, Laguna, Marinduque, Occidental Mindoro, Oriental Mindoro, Palawan, Quezon, Rizal, Romblon, Aurora (from 1979) Cities: Batangas City, Cavite City, Lipa, Lucena, Puerto Princesa, San Pablo, Tagaytay, Trece Martires)	Soledad Dolor	KBL
Region IV-A	Salvador Laurel (Note: Salvador Laurel resigned on September 16, 1983.)	UNIDO (Note: Affiliated with the Kilusang Bagong Lipunan at election.)
Region IV-A	Expedito Leviste	KBL
Region IV-A	Helena Benitez	KBL
Region IV-A	Jorge Nuñez	KBL
Region IV-A	Leonides de Leon	KBL
Region IV-A	Estanislao Fernandez (Note: Estanislao Fernandez died on July 28, 1982.)	KBL
Region IV-A	Luis Yulo	KBL
Region IV-A	Arturo Tanco Jr.	KBL
Region IV-A	Mariano Agcaoili	KBL
Region IV-A	Godofredo Tan	KBL
Region IV-A	Cesar Villariba	KBL
Region IV-A	Carmencita Reyes	KBL
Region IV-A	Pedro Mendiola	KBL
Region IV-A	Jose Leido Jr. (Note: Jose Leido Jr. died on July 30, 1983.)	KBL
Region IV-A	Teodoro Peña	KBL
Region IV-A	Medardo Tumagay (Note: Medardo Tumagay died on February 12, 1984.)	KBL
Region IV-A	Gilberto Duavit	KBL
Region IV-A	Frisco San Juan	KBL
Region IV-A	Nemesio Ganan Jr.	KBL
Region V (Note: Provinces: Albay, Camarines Norte, Camarines Sur, Catanduanes, Masbate, Sorsogon Cities: Iriga, Legazpi, Naga)	Maximino Peralta	KBL
Region V	Marcial Pimentel	KBL
Region V	Arnulfo Fuentebella	KBL
Region V	Jose Alberto	KBL
Region V	Francisco Tatad	KBL
Region V	Carlos R. Imperial	KBL
Region V	Ricardo Butalid	KBL
Region V	Emilio Espinosa Jr.	KBL
Region V	Dolores Sison	KBL
Region V	Luis Villafuerte	KBL
Region V	Socorro de Castro	KBL
Region V	Augusto Ortiz	KBL
Region VI (Note: Provinces: Aklan, Antique, Capiz, Guimaras, Iloilo, Negros Occidental Cities: Bacolod, Bago, Cadiz, Iloilo City, La Carlota, Roxas, San Carlos (Negros Occidental), Silay)	Jose Tumbokon	KBL
Region VI	Arturo Pacificador	KBL
Region VI	Teodoro Benedicto	KBL
Region VI	Alfonso Garcia	KBL
Region VI	Roberto Gatuslao	KBL
Region VI	Jose Montalvo	KBL
Region VI	Remo Montelibano	KBL
Region VI	Jose Varela Jr.	KBL
Region VI	Pedro Exmundo	KBL
Region VI	Jaenito Madamba	KBL
Region VI	Salvador Britanico	KBL
Region VI	Leopoldo Locsin	KBL
Region VI	Narciso Monfort	KBL
Region VI	Niel Tupas Sr.	KBL
Region VI	Fermin Caram Jr.	KBL
Region VI	Rodolfo Layumas	KBL
Region VII (Note: Provinces: Bohol, Cebu, Negros Oriental, Siquijor Cities: Bais, Canlaon, Cebu City, Danao, Dumaguete, Lapu-Lapu, Mandaue, Tagbilaran, Toledo)	Bartolome Cabangbang	Pusyon Bisaya
Region VII	Jorge Kintanar	Pusyon Bisaya
Region VII	Natalio Bacalso (Note: Natalio Bacalso died on March 30, 1984.)	Pusyon Bisaya
Region VII	Alfonso Corominas Jr.	Pusyon Bisaya
Region VII	Hilario Davide Jr.	Pusyon Bisaya
Region VII	Valentino Legaspi	Pusyon Bisaya
Region VII	Mariano Logarta	Pusyon Bisaya
Region VII	Julian Yballe	Pusyon Bisaya
Region VII	Filemon Fernandez	Pusyon Bisaya
Region VII	Enrique Medina Jr.	Pusyon Bisaya
Region VII	Jesus Villegas	Pusyon Bisaya
Region VII	Dominador Pernes	Pusyon Bisaya
Region VII	Eutiquio Cimafranca (Note: Eutiquio Cimafranca died on June 8, 1984.)	Pusyon Bisaya
Region VIII (Note: Provinces: Biliran, Eastern Samar, Leyte, Northern Samar, Samar, Southern Leyte Cities: Calbayog, Ormoc, Tacloban)	Jose Roño	KBL
Region VIII	Damian Aldaba	KBL
Region VIII	Emiliano Melgazo	KBL
Region VIII	Alberto Veloso	KBL
Region VIII	Fernando Veloso	KBL
Region VIII	Edilberto del Valle	KBL
Region VIII	Victor Amasa	KBL
Region VIII	Nicanor Yñiguez	KBL
Region VIII	Artemio Mate	KBL
Region VIII	Benjamin Romualdez	KBL
Region IX (Note: Provinces: Basilan, Sulu, Tawi-Tawi, Zamboanga del Norte, Zamboanga del Sur, Zamboanga Sibugay Cities: Dapitan, Dipolog, Pagadian, Zamboanga City)	Kalbi Tupay	KBL
Region IX	Guardson Lood	KBL
Region IX	Antonio Ceniza	KBL
Region IX	Ulpiano Ramas	KBL
Region IX	Hussin Loong	KBL
Region IX	Manuel Espaldon	KBL
Region IX	Celso Palma	KBL
Region IX	Joaquin Enriquez Jr.	KBL
Region X (Note: Provinces: Agusan del Norte, Agusan del Sur, Bukidnon, Camiguin, Dinagat Islands, Misamis Occidental, Misamis Oriental, Surigao del Norte Cities: Butuan, Cagayan de Oro, Gingoog, Oroquieta, Ozamiz, Surigao, Tangub)	Edelmiro Amante	KBL
Region X	Carlos Fortich	KBL
Region X	Antonio Tupaz	KBL
Region X	Reuben Canoy	Mindanao Alliance
Region X	Concordio Diel	KBL
Region X	Emmanuel Pelaez	KBL
Region X	Henry Regalado	KBL
Region X	Liliano Neri (Note: Liliano Neri died on August 24, 1978.)	KBL
Region X	Constantino Navarro Sr.	KBL
Region XI (Note: Provinces: Davao de Oro, Davao del Norte, Davao del Sur, Davao Occidental, Davao Oriental, Sarangani, South Cotabato, Surigao del Sur Cities: Davao City, General Santos)	Alejandro Almendras	KBL
Region XI	Rodolfo del Rosario	KBL
Region XI	Manuel Garcia	KBL
Region XI	Felicidad Santos	KBL
Region XI	Rogelio Sarmiento	KBL
Region XI	Benjamin Bautista	KBL
Region XI	Teodoro Palma Gil	KBL
Region XI	Jorge Royeca	KBL
Region XI	Jose Sison	KBL
Region XI	Jose Puyat Jr.	KBL
Region XII (Note: Provinces: Lanao del Norte, Lanao del Sur, Maguindanao, Cotabato, Sultan Kudarat Cities: Cotabato City, Iligan, Marawi)	Jesus Amparo	KBL
Region XII	Ernesto Roldan	Konsensiya ng Bayan
Region XII	Anacleto Badoy Jr.	KBL
Region XII	Tomas Baga Jr.	KBL
Region XII	Blah T. Sinsuat	KBL
Region XII	Abdullah Dimaporo	KBL
Region XII	Ahdel Pangandaman	KBL
Region XII	Estanislao Valdez	KBL
Agricultural Labor – Luzon	Luis Taruc	Nonpartisan
Agricultural Labor – Luzon	Jose Cervantes	Nonpartisan
Agricultural Labor – Visayas	Rolando Bayot	Nonpartisan
Agricultural Labor – Mindanao	Jiamil Ismael Dianalan	Nonpartisan
Industrial Labor – Luzon	Ruben de Ocampo	Nonpartisan
Industrial Labor – Luzon	Eulogio Lerum	Nonpartisan
Industrial Labor – Visayas	Januario Seno	Nonpartisan
Industrial Labor – Mindanao	Princess Porti Pacasum	Nonpartisan
Youth – Luzon	Danilo Concepcion	Nonpartisan
Youth – Luzon	Rogelio Peyuan	Nonpartisan
Youth – Visayas	Luisito Patalinhug	Nonpartisan
Youth – Mindanao	Nurodin Mamaluba	Nonpartisan
Youth – At-large	Macairog Aznar	Nonpartisan
Youth – At-large	Judy Carunungan	Nonpartisan

== See also ==
- Bangsamoro Transition Authority Parliament, the interim parliament of Bangsamoro
