= Jose Roño =

Filipino lawyer and politician (1923–2002)

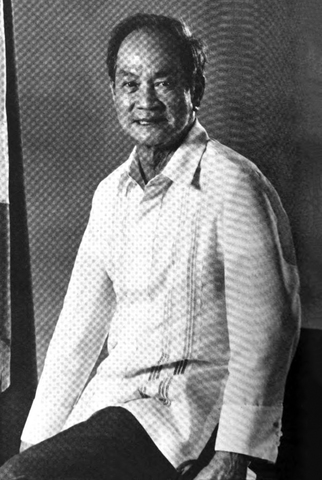
- Roño official portrait during the 8th Congress.

17th Governor of Samar
- In office June 30, 1995 – June 30, 2001
- Vice Governor: Ernesto Arcales
- Preceded by: Antonio M. Bolastig
- Succeeded by: Milagrosa Tan
- In office 1969–1973
- Preceded by: Position established
- Succeeded by: Pablo Cinco

Member of the Philippine House of Representatives from Samar's 1st district
- In office June 30, 1987 – June 30, 1992
- Preceded by: District created
- Succeeded by: Rodolfo Tuazon

Deputy Prime Minister of the Philippines
- In office June 30, 1981 – March 25, 1986
- President: Ferdinand Marcos; Corazon Aquino
- Prime Minister: Cesar Virata
- Preceded by: Cesar Virata
- Succeeded by: Position abolished

Secretary of the Interior and Local Government
- Minister of Local Government
- In office 1982 – February 25, 1986
- Preceded by: Himself (as Minister of Local Government and Community Development)
- Succeeded by: Nene Pimentel
- Minister of Local Government and Community Development
- In office 1987–1982
- Preceded by: Himself (as Secretary of Local Government and Community Development)
- Succeeded by: Himself (as Minister of Local Government)
- Secretary of Local Government and Community Development
- In office January 1, 1973 – 1978
- Preceded by: Vicente Duterte (as Secretary of General Services)
- Succeeded by: Himself (as Minister of Local Government and Community Development)

Mambabatas Pambansa from Samar
- In office 1984–1986

Mambabatas Pambansa from Region VIII
- In office 1978–1984

Governor of Western Samar
- In office 1965–1967
- Preceded by: Esteban Piczon
- Succeeded by: Position abolished

Personal details
- Born: Jose Alvarez Roño; March 23, 1923
- Died: August 30, 2002 (aged 79)
- Party: Nacionalista (until 1978; 1987–2001)
- Other political affiliations: KBL (1978–1987)
- Spouse: Carolina Dominado Sarmiento
- Children: 6, including Chito
- Education: University of Santo Tomas (LL.B.)
- Occupation: Politician
- Profession: Lawyer

Jose "Peping" Alvarez Roño (March 23, 1923 – August 30, 2002) was a Filipino lawyer and politician who served as the Deputy Prime Minister of the Philippines from 1981 to 1986. He has served in varied positions in government throughout his career: as mayor of Calbayog from 1949 to 1950 and from 1953 to 1967, as governor of Samar/Western Samar from 1967 to 1973 and from 1995 to 2001, as assemblyman for Region VIII from 1978 to 1984 and for Samar from 1984 to 1986, and as representative of Samar's 1st district from 1987 to 1992. From 1973 to 1986, Roño served as the Minister/Secretary of Local Government. Roño was the party secretary general of Kilusang Bagong Lipunan, the administration party, when president Ferdinand Marcos was deposed in the People Power Revolution in 1986.

== Political career ==
After brief period of legal practice, he assumed as the Mayor of Calbayog. He resigned in 1950 and return to legal practice but later re appointed in 1953 and served until 1959. He was re-elected in 1963 and served until 1967.

He served as the governor of Samar from 1967 to 1973. After his stint, he was appointed by Ferdinand Marcos as the Local Government Minister from 1973 until 1986. He was also elected as a Mamabatas Pambansa for Eastern Visayas Region in 1978, and served until 1986.

After Congress restored, he won as Congressman for Samar's 1st district, and served until 1992. He later ran for Governor in 1995 and won, and served until 2001.

== Personal life ==
Roño was the father of filmmaker and music producer Chito S. Roño.

== Death ==
He died of pneumonia on August 30, 2002.
