= Results of the 1978 Philippine parliamentary election =

The following are the results of the 1978 Philippine parliamentary election by region and sector.

== By region ==
=== Region I – Ilocos Region ===
| Candidate | Party | Votes | % |
|---|---|---|---|
| Conrado Estrella Sr. | Kilusang Bagong Lipunan | 1,336,732 | 7.74 |
| Jose Aspiras | Kilusang Bagong Lipunan | 1,257,805 | 7.28 |
| Felipe de Vera | Kilusang Bagong Lipunan | 1,229,307 | 7.12 |
| Vicente Millora | Kilusang Bagong Lipunan | 1,227,538 | 7.11 |
| Antonio Villar Sr. | Kilusang Bagong Lipunan | 1,220,650 | 7.07 |
| Roque de Guzman | Kilusang Bagong Lipunan | 1,213,596 | 7.03 |
| Jeremias Montemayor | Kilusang Bagong Lipunan | 1,186,245 | 6.87 |
| Antonio Raquiza | Kilusang Bagong Lipunan | 1,175,134 | 6.80 |
| Andres Cosalan | Kilusang Bagong Lipunan | 1,158,006 | 6.70 |
| Victor Dominguez | Kilusang Bagong Lipunan | 1,145,314 | 6.63 |
| Salacnib Baterina | Kilusang Bagong Lipunan | 1,139,117 | 6.59 |
| Lucas Cauton | Kilusang Bagong Lipunan | 1,138,601 | 6.59 |
| Joaquin L. Ortega | Kilusang Bagong Lipunan | 1,136,555 | 6.58 |
| Jeremias Zapata | Kilusang Bagong Lipunan | 1,125,474 | 6.52 |
| Juan Primicias | Independent | 89,376 | 0.52 |
| Pedro Peralta | Independent | 67,701 | 0.39 |
| Julius Magno | Confederation of Ilocano Associations | 55,265 | 0.32 |
| Galleazzo Bucaycay | Independent | 53,594 | 0.31 |
| Joaquin T. Ortega | Independent | 48,946 | 0.28 |
| Glory Fernandez | Independent | 32,048 | 0.19 |
| Jehoven Quetulio | Independent | 30,145 | 0.17 |
| Constante Pimentel | Independent | 28,420 | 0.16 |
| Benito Valdez | Independent | 23,400 | 0.14 |
| Eusebio Agonias | Independent | 23,379 | 0.14 |
| Eubegildo Binongcal | Independent | 17,777 | 0.10 |
| Ernesto Antolin | Independent | 16,647 | 0.10 |
| Macario Valdez | Independent | 16,040 | 0.09 |
| Antonio Castro | Independent | 15,474 | 0.09 |
| Ciriaco del Amor | Independent | 14,895 | 0.09 |
| Cesar Vistro | Independent | 14,747 | 0.09 |
| Amparo Andrada | Emancipated Scientists Party | 11,926 | 0.07 |
| Samson Blancas Jr. | Independent | 11,672 | 0.07 |
| Sergio Tabuga | Emancipated Scientists Party | 5,852 | 0.03 |
| Amschel Noel Maria Roth-Mortel | Independent | 5,577 | 0.03 |
| Total | | 17,272,955 | 100.00 |
| Total votes | | 1,487,260 | – |
| Registered voters/turnout | | 1,639,523 | 90.71 |

=== Region II – Cagayan Valley ===
| Candidate | Party | Votes | % |
|---|---|---|---|
| Juan Ponce Enrile | Kilusang Bagong Lipunan | 847,090 | 13.44 |
| Rodolfo Albano Jr. | Kilusang Bagong Lipunan | 776,519 | 12.32 |
| Benjamin Perez | Kilusang Bagong Lipunan | 770,412 | 12.22 |
| Carlos Padilla | Kilusang Bagong Lipunan | 767,527 | 12.18 |
| Prospero Bello | Kilusang Bagong Lipunan | 758,505 | 12.04 |
| Rolando Puzon | Kilusang Bagong Lipunan | 758,396 | 12.03 |
| Gualberto Lumauig | Kilusang Bagong Lipunan | 754,707 | 11.98 |
| Simon Gato | Kilusang Bagong Lipunan | 745,362 | 11.83 |
| Roy Domingo Masadao Jr. | Independent | 57,998 | 0.92 |
| Quirico Pilotin | Confederation of Ilocano Associations | 26,329 | 0.42 |
| Brigido Buenafe | Partido ng Bagong Pilipino | 14,175 | 0.22 |
| Sofronio Quimosing | Nacionalista Party | 9,090 | 0.14 |
| Custodio Villalva | Emancipated Scientists Party | 7,901 | 0.13 |
| Felipe Espiritu | Independent | 4,618 | 0.07 |
| Inocencio Centeno | Independent | 3,441 | 0.05 |
| Total | | 6,302,070 | 100.00 |
| Total votes | | 887,244 | – |
| Registered voters/turnout | | 969,092 | 91.55 |

=== Region III – Central Luzon ===
| Candidate | Party | Votes | % |
|---|---|---|---|
| Blas Ople | Kilusang Bagong Lipunan | 1,369,038 | 6.54 |
| Felicitas Bernardino | Kilusang Bagong Lipunan | 1,295,297 | 6.19 |
| Teodulo Natividad | Kilusang Bagong Lipunan | 1,288,563 | 6.16 |
| Estelito Mendoza | Kilusang Bagong Lipunan | 1,279,698 | 6.12 |
| Vicente Magsaysay | Kilusang Bagong Lipunan | 1,266,224 | 6.05 |
| Juan Liwag | Kilusang Bagong Lipunan | 1,260,099 | 6.02 |
| Vicente Abad Santos | Bagong Lipunan-Kilusan ng Nagkakaisang Nacionalista, Liberal | 1,249,185 | 5.97 |
| Cicero Jose Punzalan | Kilusang Bagong Lipunan | 1,238,482 | 5.92 |
| Leopoldo Diaz | Kilusang Bagong Lipunan | 1,236,992 | 5.91 |
| Mercedes Teodoro | Kilusang Bagong Lipunan | 1,228,590 | 5.87 |
| Angel Concepcion | Kilusang Bagong Lipunan | 1,227,814 | 5.87 |
| Antonino Roman Jr. | Kilusang Bagong Lipunan | 1,199,173 | 5.73 |
| Eller Torres | Kilusang Bagong Lipunan | 1,196,287 | 5.72 |
| Narciso Nario | Kilusang Bagong Lipunan | 1,193,678 | 5.71 |
| Amadeo Alinea | Kilusang Bagong Lipunan | 1,182,779 | 5.65 |
| Baldomero Mangiliman | Kilusang Bagong Lipunan | 1,158,878 | 5.54 |
| Rebeck Espiritu | Lakas ng Bayan | 141,210 | 0.67 |
| Fidel Reyes | Kilusang Bagong Lipunan | 88,215 | 0.42 |
| Jesus Santos | Independent | 86,180 | 0.41 |
| Gualberto dela Llana | Independent | 85,247 | 0.41 |
| Victor Cadiz | Independent | 77,802 | 0.37 |
| Hoover Canlas | Independent | 72,809 | 0.35 |
| Bernabe Buscayno | Independent | 70,835 | 0.34 |
| Purita Trabajo | Independent | 65,701 | 0.31 |
| Benjamin de Leon | Independent | 64,430 | 0.31 |
| John Manalili | Independent | 48,599 | 0.23 |
| Daniel David | Citizens Union for Progress | 44,893 | 0.21 |
| Rolando Samaniego | Independent | 40,437 | 0.19 |
| Benigno Navarro | Philippine Labor Party | 31,599 | 0.15 |
| George Haygood | Independent | 30,063 | 0.14 |
| Andrea Ocampo | Emancipated Scientists Party | 26,487 | 0.13 |
| Benigno Marquez | Emancipated Scientists Party | 23,118 | 0.11 |
| Fausta Santos | Emancipated Scientists Party | 20,030 | 0.10 |
| Teodorico Magcawas | Partido ng Bagong Pilipino | 18,319 | 0.09 |
| Troadio Carbungco | Emancipated Scientists Party | 14,760 | 0.07 |
| Total | | 20,921,511 | 100.00 |
| Total votes | | 1,745,877 | – |
| Registered voters/turnout | | 2,063,864 | 84.59 |

=== Region IV – Metro Manila ===
All twenty-one candidates of Lakas ng Bayan lost the elections.

| Candidate | Party | Votes | % |
|---|---|---|---|
| Imelda Marcos | Kilusang Bagong Lipunan | 1,795,120 | 3.24 |
| Carlos P. Romulo | Kilusang Bagong Lipunan | 1,771,272 | 3.20 |
| Arturo Tolentino | Kilusang Bagong Lipunan | 1,757,636 | 3.17 |
| Eddie Ilarde | Kilusang Bagong Lipunan | 1,748,368 | 3.15 |
| Fred Elizalde | Kilusang Bagong Lipunan | 1,690,033 | 3.05 |
| Gerardo Espina Sr. | Kilusang Bagong Lipunan | 1,647,240 | 2.97 |
| Querube Makalintal | Kilusang Bagong Lipunan | 1,600,800 | 2.89 |
| Vicente Paterno | Kilusang Bagong Lipunan | 1,591,721 | 2.87 |
| Ronaldo Zamora | Kilusang Bagong Lipunan | 1,588,642 | 2.87 |
| Jose Conrado Benitez | Kilusang Bagong Lipunan | 1,585,816 | 2.86 |
| Ricardo C. Puno | Kilusang Bagong Lipunan | 1,579,435 | 2.85 |
| Jose P. Bengzon | Kilusang Bagong Lipunan | 1,565,450 | 2.82 |
| Roberto Oca Jr. | Kilusang Bagong Lipunan | 1,563,291 | 2.82 |
| Emilio Abello Sr. | Kilusang Bagong Lipunan | 1,542,888 | 2.78 |
| Januario Soller Jr. | Kilusang Bagong Lipunan | 1,536,935 | 2.77 |
| Pablo Floro | Kilusang Bagong Lipunan | 1,522,657 | 2.75 |
| Alejandro Fider | Kilusang Bagong Lipunan | 1,512,108 | 2.73 |
| Manuel Camara | Kilusang Bagong Lipunan | 1,504,981 | 2.72 |
| Estanislao Alinea Jr. | Kilusang Bagong Lipunan | 1,485,247 | 2.68 |
| Rogelio Quiambao | Kilusang Bagong Lipunan | 1,471,543 | 2.66 |
| Waldo Perfecto | Kilusang Bagong Lipunan | 1,453,430 | 2.62 |
| Ninoy Aquino | Lakas ng Bayan | 1,219,893 | 2.20 |
| Soc Rodrigo | Lakas ng Bayan | 1,183,340 | 2.14 |
| Ramon Mitra Jr. | Lakas ng Bayan | 1,179,529 | 2.13 |
| Ernesto Maceda | Lakas ng Bayan | 1,157,648 | 2.09 |
| Alejandro Roces | Lakas ng Bayan | 1,140,817 | 2.06 |
| Rosario Planas | Lakas ng Bayan | 1,133,483 | 2.05 |
| Neptali Gonzales | Lakas ng Bayan | 1,103,817 | 1.99 |
| Jaime Ferrer | Lakas ng Bayan | 1,052,836 | 1.90 |
| Cesar Lucero | Lakas ng Bayan | 1,018,723 | 1.84 |
| Juan David | Lakas ng Bayan | 994,553 | 1.79 |
| Felicisimo Cabigao | Lakas ng Bayan | 992,457 | 1.79 |
| Fernando Barican | Lakas ng Bayan | 987,809 | 1.78 |
| Napoleon Rama | Lakas ng Bayan | 977,148 | 1.76 |
| Aquilino Pimentel Jr. | Lakas ng Bayan | 948,725 | 1.71 |
| Teofisto Guingona Jr. | Lakas ng Bayan | 943,820 | 1.70 |
| Antonio Martinez | Lakas ng Bayan | 937,442 | 1.69 |
| Trinidad Herrera | Lakas ng Bayan | 933,384 | 1.68 |
| Primitivo de Leon | Lakas ng Bayan | 919,832 | 1.66 |
| Alexander Boncayao | Lakas ng Bayan | 912,463 | 1.65 |
| Ernesto Rondon | Lakas ng Bayan | 897,731 | 1.62 |
| Emmanuel Santos | Lakas ng Bayan | 896,788 | 1.62 |
| Rafael Yabut | Consumers Party | 36,088 | 0.07 |
| Delfin Manlapaz | Emancipated Scientists Party | 19,044 | 0.03 |
| Damaso Flores | Independent | 18,704 | 0.03 |
| Jose Burgos Jr. | Youth Democratic Movement | 15,408 | 0.03 |
| Jose Ocampo Sr. | Emancipated Scientists Party | 11,566 | 0.02 |
| Beatriz Umali | Emancipated Scientists Party | 9,522 | 0.02 |
| Ernesto Tolentino | Youth Democratic Movement | 8,840 | 0.02 |
| Conrado Mendoza | Emancipated Scientists Party | 8,726 | 0.02 |
| Virgilio Ferrer | Youth Democratic Movement | 8,275 | 0.01 |
| Ireneo Angeles | Consumers Party | 8,213 | 0.01 |
| Humberto Moran | Emancipated Scientists Party | 6,385 | 0.01 |
| John Joseph Jr. | Emancipated Scientists Party | 6,258 | 0.01 |
| Johnny Regalado | Partido Sambayanang Pilipino | 6,098 | 0.01 |
| Marcelino Arias | Independent | 5,841 | 0.01 |
| Bernardita Arroyo | Emancipated Scientists Party | 5,690 | 0.01 |
| Isidro Real | Emancipated Scientists Party | 5,073 | 0.01 |
| Rosendo Yap | Independent | 5,003 | 0.01 |
| Salvador Valencia Sr. | Consumers Party | 4,948 | 0.01 |
| Ignacio Katapang | Emancipated Scientists Party | 4,893 | 0.01 |
| Emilio Guinto | Emancipated Scientists Party | 4,821 | 0.01 |
| Angel Gonzales | Independent | 4,758 | 0.01 |
| Narciso Castro | Youth Democratic Movement | 4,551 | 0.01 |
| Emilia dela Cruz | Emancipated Scientists Party | 4,496 | 0.01 |
| Rolando Olalia | Independent | 4,286 | 0.01 |
| Alfredo de Leon | Emancipated Scientists Party | 4,273 | 0.01 |
| Eusebio Cunanan | Emancipated Scientists Party | 4,268 | 0.01 |
| Bonier de Guzman | Independent | 4,151 | 0.01 |
| Conchita Ramos | Consumers Party | 4,134 | 0.01 |
| Felipe Navarro | Independent | 3,916 | 0.01 |
| Justa Dimayuga | Emancipated Scientists Party | 3,825 | 0.01 |
| Melannie Fernandez | Youth Democratic Movement | 3,497 | 0.01 |
| Virgilio Villaflor | Consumers Party | 3,423 | 0.01 |
| Emilia Peralta | Emancipated Scientists Party | 3,265 | 0.01 |
| Dina Atencio-Santos | Emancipated Scientists Party | 3,226 | 0.01 |
| Reynaldo Panopio | Consumers Party | 3,211 | 0.01 |
| Carlos Gopez | Emancipated Scientists Party | 3,181 | 0.01 |
| Juanito Lagao | Emancipated Scientists Party | 3,033 | 0.01 |
| Remedios Ong | Consumers Party | 2,892 | 0.01 |
| Lorerto Bertolano | Emancipated Scientists Party | 2,806 | 0.01 |
| Manuel Igrobay | Consumers Party | 2,743 | 0.00 |
| Ferrer Co | Independent | 2,723 | 0.00 |
| Melquiades Virata | Independent | 2,715 | 0.00 |
| Rodolfo Cajucom | Emancipated Scientists Party | 2,641 | 0.00 |
| Epifanio delos Santos | Lapiang Bagong Silang | 2,615 | 0.00 |
| Melchor Simbulan | Partido Sambayanang Pilipino | 2,572 | 0.00 |
| Isabelo Lim | Independent | 2,550 | 0.00 |
| Rodolfo Pagaduan | Emancipated Scientists Party | 2,526 | 0.00 |
| Roman Uy | Banyuhay | 2,402 | 0.00 |
| Jose Francisco | Independent | 2,388 | 0.00 |
| Leonida Supetran | Emancipated Scientists Party | 2,355 | 0.00 |
| Cirilo Bravo | Lapiang Bagong Silang | 2,304 | 0.00 |
| Oscar Ibay | Banyuhay | 2,198 | 0.00 |
| Paz Tengtio | Emancipated Scientists Party | 2,037 | 0.00 |
| Inocencio Dumlao | Independent | 2,025 | 0.00 |
| Catalino Luzano | Partido Sambayanang Pilipino | 2,004 | 0.00 |
| Conrado Reyes | Banyuhay | 1,860 | 0.00 |
| Francisco Pasion | Consumers Party | 1,852 | 0.00 |
| Andres Abarquez | Independent | 1,806 | 0.00 |
| Rodolfo Leyco | Partido Sambayanang Pilipino | 1,780 | 0.00 |
| Magno Sazon | Banyuhay | 1,737 | 0.00 |
| Alexander Lerona | Consumers Party | 1,712 | 0.00 |
| Jose Blanza | Lapiang Bagong Silang | 1,688 | 0.00 |
| Cipriano Cabrera | Independent | 1,665 | 0.00 |
| Phoebe Luz Salcedo | Lapiang Bagong Silang | 1,630 | 0.00 |
| Jose Villadolid | Partido Sambayanang Pilipino | 1,608 | 0.00 |
| Nellie Farinas | Independent | 1,531 | 0.00 |
| Ernesto Hidalgo | Independent | 1,488 | 0.00 |
| Arthur Amansec | Independent | 1,480 | 0.00 |
| Anthony Fortuna | Banyuhay | 1,476 | 0.00 |
| Pablo Soriano | Independent | 1,431 | 0.00 |
| Ruperto Galang | Independent | 1,421 | 0.00 |
| Conrado Galang | Independent | 1,421 | 0.00 |
| Gerardo Cornejo | Independent | 1,362 | 0.00 |
| Pedro Bolofer | Lapiang Bagong Silang | 1,328 | 0.00 |
| Luningning Mallari | Independent | 1,302 | 0.00 |
| Oscar Pascua | Independent | 1,298 | 0.00 |
| Reynaldo Reyes | Independent | 1,184 | 0.00 |
| Eusebio Ezpeleta | Independent | 1,181 | 0.00 |
| Jorge Mateo | Independent | 1,174 | 0.00 |
| Antonio Villar Jr. | Independent | 1,147 | 0.00 |
| Augusto Ibay | Independent | 1,120 | 0.00 |
| Danilo Galang | Independent | 1,114 | 0.00 |
| Reynaldo Navarez | Independent | 1,106 | 0.00 |
| Antipas Estipona | Independent | 1,090 | 0.00 |
| Benvenuto Juatco | Independent | 1,080 | 0.00 |
| Geronimo delos Reyes | Independent | 1,052 | 0.00 |
| Venancio Santiago | Lapiang Bagong Silang | 1,048 | 0.00 |
| Felino Guetan | Partido Sambayanang Pilipino | 997 | 0.00 |
| Joaquin Pablo | Independent | 989 | 0.00 |
| Ricardo de Jose | Independent | 970 | 0.00 |
| Elias Dulalia | Independent | 948 | 0.00 |
| Jose Manas | Independent | 929 | 0.00 |
| Frankie Grego | Independent | 850 | 0.00 |
| Jose Calilung | Lapiang Bagong Silang | 844 | 0.00 |
| Ephraim Salcedo | Independent | 787 | 0.00 |
| Pacifico Morelos | Independent | 721 | 0.00 |
| Alejandro Gador | Independent | 689 | 0.00 |
| Magdaleno Apachecha | Independent | 680 | 0.00 |
| Arturo Samaniego | Independent | 679 | 0.00 |
| Alipio Juntilla | Independent | 588 | 0.00 |
| Victorio Sosing | Independent | 526 | 0.00 |
| Virgilio Juliano | Independent | 509 | 0.00 |
| Demetrio Salem | Independent | 505 | 0.00 |
| Ignacio Serra Jr. | Independent | 489 | 0.00 |
| Nicolas Grio Jr. | Banyuhay | 465 | 0.00 |
| Simeon del Rosario | Independent | 461 | 0.00 |
| Federico Intal Lutero | Independent | 360 | 0.00 |
| Ricarte Ventosa | Independent | 282 | 0.00 |
| Ultoz Javierto | Independent | 216 | 0.00 |
| Total | | 55,415,893 | 100.00 |
| Total votes | | 2,931,412 | – |
| Registered voters/turnout | | 3,554,991 | 82.46 |

=== Region IV-A – Southern Tagalog ===
| Candidate | Party | Votes | % |
|---|---|---|---|
| Arturo Tanco Jr. | Kilusang Bagong Lipunan | 1,562,581 | 5.89 |
| Jose Leido Jr. | Kilusang Bagong Lipunan | 1,544,502 | 5.82 |
| Salvador Laurel | Kilusang Bagong Lipunan | 1,491,249 | 5.62 |
| Luis Yulo | Kilusang Bagong Lipunan | 1,436,239 | 5.41 |
| Carmencita Reyes | Kilusang Bagong Lipunan | 1,434,232 | 5.41 |
| Estanislao Fernandez | Kilusang Bagong Lipunan | 1,341,619 | 5.06 |
| Soledad Dolor | Kilusang Bagong Lipunan | 1,334,265 | 5.03 |
| Expedito Leviste | Kilusang Bagong Lipunan | 1,313,304 | 4.95 |
| Helena Benitez | Kilusang Bagong Lipunan | 1,276,508 | 4.81 |
| Teodoro Peña | Kilusang Bagong Lipunan | 1,265,083 | 4.77 |
| Medardo Tumagay | Kilusang Bagong Lipunan | 1,251,502 | 4.72 |
| Gilberto Duavit Sr. | Kilusang Bagong Lipunan | 1,249,036 | 4.71 |
| Mariano Agcaoili | Kilusang Bagong Lipunan | 1,216,581 | 4.59 |
| Godofredo Tan | Kilusang Bagong Lipunan | 1,214,765 | 4.58 |
| Leonides de Leon | Kilusang Bagong Lipunan | 1,210,856 | 4.56 |
| Pedro Mendiola | Kilusang Bagong Lipunan | 1,175,978 | 4.43 |
| Frisco San Juan Sr. | Kilusang Bagong Lipunan | 1,167,512 | 4.40 |
| Jorge Nuñez | Kilusang Bagong Lipunan | 1,165,779 | 4.40 |
| Cesar Villariba | Kilusang Bagong Lipunan | 1,146,206 | 4.32 |
| Nemesio Ganan Jr. | Kilusang Bagong Lipunan | 1,138,031 | 4.29 |
| Pedro Medalla Sr. | Independent | 190,976 | 0.72 |
| Calixto Ramos | Independent | 52,768 | 0.20 |
| Alberto Belen | Bagong Lipunan-Kilusan ng Nagkakaisang Nacionalista, Liberal | 46,401 | 0.17 |
| Pacifico Flores | Independent | 45,065 | 0.17 |
| Alan Sarmiento | Emancipated Scientists Party | 43,124 | 0.16 |
| Augosto Cruz | Emancipated Scientists Party | 42,437 | 0.16 |
| Juanito Leaño | Emancipated Scientists Party | 37,057 | 0.14 |
| Virgilio Magnaye | Independent | 36,517 | 0.14 |
| Pepito Remo | Emancipated Scientists Party | 33,370 | 0.13 |
| Ignacio Lagunero | Partido ng Bagong Pilipino | 31,292 | 0.12 |
| Alfredo Dador | Independent | 30,231 | 0.11 |
| Total | | 26,525,066 | 100.00 |
| Total votes | | 2,276,005 | – |
| Registered voters/turnout | | 2,653,508 | 85.77 |

=== Region V – Bicol Region ===
| Candidate | Party | Votes | % |
|---|---|---|---|
| Francisco Tatad | Bagong Lipunan-Kilusan ng Nagkakaisang Nacionalista, Liberal | 688,928 | 6.35 |
| Luis Villafuerte | Bagong Lipunan-Kilusan ng Nagkakaisang Nacionalista, Liberal | 651,931 | 6.01 |
| Dolores Sison | Bagong Lipunan-Kilusan ng Nagkakaisang Nacionalista, Liberal | 586,421 | 5.40 |
| Jose Alberto | Bagong Lipunan-Kilusan ng Nagkakaisang Nacionalista, Liberal | 563,355 | 5.19 |
| Arnulfo Fuentebella | Bagong Lipunan-Kilusan ng Nagkakaisang Nacionalista, Liberal | 561,847 | 5.18 |
| Emilio Espinosa Jr. | Bagong Lipunan-Kilusan ng Nagkakaisang Nacionalista, Liberal | 560,624 | 5.17 |
| Marcial Pimentel | Bagong Lipunan-Kilusan ng Nagkakaisang Nacionalista, Liberal | 479,641 | 4.42 |
| Augusto Ortiz | Bagong Lipunan-Kilusan ng Nagkakaisang Nacionalista, Liberal | 478,150 | 4.41 |
| Ricardo Butalid | Bagong Lipunan-Kilusan ng Nagkakaisang Nacionalista, Liberal | 472,722 | 4.36 |
| Carlos R. Imperial | Bagong Lipunan-Kilusan ng Nagkakaisang Nacionalista, Liberal | 464,663 | 4.28 |
| Maximino Peralta | Bagong Lipunan-Kilusan ng Nagkakaisang Nacionalista, Liberal | 460,291 | 4.24 |
| Socorro de Castro | Bagong Lipunan-Kilusan ng Nagkakaisang Nacionalista, Liberal | 427,151 | 3.94 |
| Eddie Alanis | Bicol Saro | 426,749 | 3.93 |
| Angelita Ago | Young Philippines | 261,982 | 2.41 |
| Hilario Abonal | Bicol Saro | 226,515 | 2.09 |
| Alfredo Tria | Bicol Saro | 220,763 | 2.03 |
| Mariano Trinidad | Bicol Saro | 194,421 | 1.79 |
| Wenceslao Vinzons Jr. | Young Philippines | 189,541 | 1.75 |
| Henry Fajardo | Bicol Saro | 182,443 | 1.68 |
| Salvador Princesa | Bicol Saro | 176,046 | 1.62 |
| Roger Panotes | Bicol Saro | 175,482 | 1.62 |
| Monico Imperial | Bicol Saro | 174,544 | 1.61 |
| Apolonio Maleniza | Independent | 171,135 | 1.58 |
| Victorino Ojeda | Bicol Saro | 169,236 | 1.56 |
| Gualberto Manlangit | Bicol Saro | 159,400 | 1.47 |
| Rolando Falcon | Independent | 153,948 | 1.42 |
| Mateo Esparrago Jr. | Young Philippines | 148,948 | 1.37 |
| Delfin de Vera | Young Philippines | 146,080 | 1.35 |
| Joseph Bunao | Independent | 143,963 | 1.33 |
| Jose Lachica | Young Philippines | 133,626 | 1.23 |
| Ireneo Reyes Jr. | Young Philippines | 105,377 | 0.97 |
| Publico Tibi Jr. | Young Philippines | 104,490 | 0.96 |
| Romulo Roy | Young Philippines | 100,029 | 0.92 |
| Matias Din | Young Philippines | 95,681 | 0.88 |
| Jerry Bañares | Young Philippines | 94,862 | 0.87 |
| Lino Azicate | Young Philippines | 90,945 | 0.84 |
| Luis Tayo | Independent | 90,587 | 0.83 |
| Jose Balde | Independent | 86,643 | 0.80 |
| Rodolfo Ante | Independent | 79,328 | 0.73 |
| Eduardo Pilapil | Independent | 39,398 | 0.36 |
| Porfirio Espeso | Independent | 18,969 | 0.17 |
| Jaime Hernandez | Independent | 17,700 | 0.16 |
| Jaime Veloso | Independent | 16,322 | 0.15 |
| Leonelo Opida | Independent | 15,110 | 0.14 |
| Felix Gimeno | Independent | 8,220 | 0.08 |
| Orlando Ailes | Independent | 8,028 | 0.07 |
| Joseph de Castro | Independent | 7,364 | 0.07 |
| Pio Camposano | Independent | 4,782 | 0.04 |
| Roberto Reverente | Independent | 4,604 | 0.04 |
| Tomas Broqueza | Independent | 3,006 | 0.03 |
| Reynesto Catapang | Emancipated Scientists Party | 2,847 | 0.03 |
| Venicio Flores | Independent | 2,738 | 0.03 |
| Pantaleon Panelo | Independent | 2,273 | 0.02 |
| Antonio Cope | Independent | 2,017 | 0.02 |
| Felix Belchez | Independent | 1,644 | 0.02 |
| Total | | 10,853,510 | 100.00 |
| Total votes | | 1,245,428 | – |
| Registered voters/turnout | | 1,422,763 | 87.54 |

=== Region VI – Western Visayas ===
| Candidate | Party | Votes | % |
|---|---|---|---|
| Narciso Monfort | Kilusang Bagong Lipunan | 1,195,069 | 5.82 |
| Niel Tupas Sr. | Kilusang Bagong Lipunan | 1,189,529 | 5.80 |
| Fermin Caram Jr. | Kilusang Bagong Lipunan | 1,186,267 | 5.78 |
| Salvador Britanico | Kilusang Bagong Lipunan | 1,180,554 | 5.75 |
| Roberto Gatuslao | Kilusang Bagong Lipunan | 1,163,536 | 5.67 |
| Leopoldo Locsin | Kilusang Bagong Lipunan | 1,156,429 | 5.64 |
| Remo Montelibano | Kilusang Bagong Lipunan | 1,146,083 | 5.59 |
| Teodoro Benedicto | Kilusang Bagong Lipunan | 1,135,107 | 5.53 |
| Arturo Pacificador | Kilusang Bagong Lipunan | 1,113,846 | 5.43 |
| Alfonso Garcia | Kilusang Bagong Lipunan | 1,101,911 | 5.37 |
| Jose Varela Jr. | Kilusang Bagong Lipunan | 1,096,790 | 5.35 |
| Jose Montalvo | Kilusang Bagong Lipunan | 1,094,203 | 5.33 |
| Jose Tumbokon | Kilusang Bagong Lipunan | 1,093,804 | 5.33 |
| Pedro Exmundo | Kilusang Bagong Lipunan | 1,083,136 | 5.28 |
| Jaenito Madamba | Kilusang Bagong Lipunan | 1,033,803 | 5.04 |
| Rodolfo Layumas | Kilusang Bagong Lipunan | 1,032,596 | 5.03 |
| Alex Espino | Independent | 365,234 | 1.78 |
| Pascual Espinosa | Independent | 270,355 | 1.32 |
| Andresito Fornier | Independent | 245,557 | 1.20 |
| Nerio Salcedo Jr. | Independent | 186,180 | 0.91 |
| Fredenil Castro | Independent | 181,790 | 0.89 |
| Juan Dayang | Independent | 173,359 | 0.84 |
| Resurrecion Salvilla | Independent | 155,833 | 0.76 |
| Felipe Macahilig Jr. | Independent | 143,148 | 0.70 |
| Enrique Olmedo | Independent | 139,857 | 0.68 |
| Lucio Himbing Jr. | Independent | 125,289 | 0.61 |
| Nelson Oquendo | Independent | 113,561 | 0.55 |
| Benjamin Moreno | Independent | 82,188 | 0.40 |
| Arturo Doronila | Independent | 69,185 | 0.34 |
| Vicente Balsomo | Independent | 65,251 | 0.32 |
| Ruben Duron | Philippine Labor Party | 62,688 | 0.31 |
| Alfredo Loyola | Independent | 56,838 | 0.28 |
| Nic Garces | Independent | 50,079 | 0.24 |
| Roger Nite | Partido ng Bagong Pilipinas | 18,050 | 0.09 |
| Jovito Pabion | Partido ng Bagong Pilipinas | 10,126 | 0.05 |
| Total | | 20,517,231 | 100.00 |
| Total votes | | 1,644,637 | – |
| Registered voters/turnout | | 1,878,497 | 87.55 |

=== Region VII – Central Visayas ===
All thirteen candidates of Pusyon Bisaya won the elections.

| Candidate | Party | Votes | % |
|---|---|---|---|
| Jorge Kintanar | Pusyon Bisaya | 785,565 | 4.55 |
| Natalio Bacalso | Pusyon Bisaya | 777,884 | 4.51 |
| Bartolome Cabangbang | Pusyon Bisaya | 775,572 | 4.49 |
| Filemon Fernandez | Pusyon Bisaya | 762,017 | 4.42 |
| Hilario Davide Jr. | Pusyon Bisaya | 751,173 | 4.35 |
| Valentino Legaspi | Pusyon Bisaya | 733,346 | 4.25 |
| Jesus Villegas | Pusyon Bisaya | 731,072 | 4.24 |
| Julian Yballe | Pusyon Bisaya | 720,232 | 4.17 |
| Mariano Logarta | Pusyon Bisaya | 718,542 | 4.16 |
| Eutiquio Cimafranca | Pusyon Bisaya | 698,471 | 4.05 |
| Enrique Medina Jr. | Pusyon Bisaya | 687,402 | 3.98 |
| Alfonso Corominas Jr. | Pusyon Bisaya | 685,949 | 3.97 |
| Dominador Pernes | Pusyon Bisaya | 668,191 | 3.87 |
| Eduardo Gullas | Kilusang Bagong Lipunan | 634,315 | 3.68 |
| Lito Osmeña | Kilusang Bagong Lipunan | 621,589 | 3.60 |
| Antonio Cuenco | Kilusang Bagong Lipunan | 606,446 | 3.51 |
| Ramon Durano III | Kilusang Bagong Lipunan | 603,499 | 3.50 |
| Gonzalo Catan Jr. | Kilusang Bagong Lipunan | 585,551 | 3.39 |
| Tomas Toledo | Kilusang Bagong Lipunan | 582,240 | 3.37 |
| Emerito Calderon | Kilusang Bagong Lipunan | 575,861 | 3.34 |
| Rene Espina | Kilusang Bagong Lipunan | 574,710 | 3.33 |
| Pablo P. Garcia | Kilusang Bagong Lipunan | 569,440 | 3.30 |
| Victor dela Serna | Kilusang Bagong Lipunan | 568,298 | 3.29 |
| Andres Bustamante | Kilusang Bagong Lipunan | 552,240 | 3.20 |
| Lino Chatto | Kilusang Bagong Lipunan | 551,004 | 3.19 |
| Romulo Senining | Kilusang Bagong Lipunan | 548,738 | 3.18 |
| Jose Amadora | Partido Democrata | 20,409 | 0.12 |
| Caridad Trocino | Partido Democrata | 16,347 | 0.09 |
| Narciso Aliño Jr. | Partido Democrata | 15,641 | 0.09 |
| Leodegario Cañete | Independent | 13,757 | 0.08 |
| Antonio Vicencio Jr. | Independent | 12,492 | 0.07 |
| Roso Sabalones | Independent | 10,838 | 0.06 |
| Antonio Alvarez | Independent | 10,726 | 0.06 |
| Danilo Gonzales | Lakas ng Bayan | 9,362 | 0.05 |
| Teotimo Monteclar | Partido Democrata | 8,770 | 0.05 |
| Emilio Lumontad Jr. | Partido Democrata | 8,421 | 0.05 |
| Manuel Maranga | Partido Democrata | 8,019 | 0.05 |
| Jose Echaves | Partido Democrata | 7,542 | 0.04 |
| Basilio Duaban | Partido Democrata | 7,527 | 0.04 |
| Diomedes Cane | Partido Democrata | 7,228 | 0.04 |
| Florencio Bajarias | Partido Democrata | 6,194 | 0.04 |
| Rodisendo Sabanal | Partido Democrata | 5,042 | 0.03 |
| Narciso Pepito | Independent | 4,291 | 0.02 |
| Jesus Echavez | Independent | 3,359 | 0.02 |
| Salvador Barrameda | Independent | 2,320 | 0.01 |
| Bibiano Rivera | Independent | 1,862 | 0.01 |
| Glicerio Cavalida | Independent | 1,581 | 0.01 |
| Ruben Cloma | Independent | 1,577 | 0.01 |
| Manuel Seco | Independent | 1,235 | 0.01 |
| Agustin Sepulveda | Independent | 1,152 | 0.01 |
| Orlando Labra | Independent | 1,149 | 0.01 |
| Zacarias Campaner | Independent | 1,081 | 0.01 |
| Anselmo Pantinople | Independent | 642 | 0.00 |
| Jose Pantorilla | Independent | 433 | 0.00 |
| Total | | 17,258,344 | 100.00 |
| Total votes | | 1,508,799 | – |
| Registered voters/turnout | | 1,716,009 | 87.92 |

=== Region VIII – Eastern Visayas ===
| Candidate | Party | Votes | % |
|---|---|---|---|
| Benjamin Romualdez | Kilusang Bagong Lipunan | 810,614 | 16.15 |
| Jose Roño | Kilusang Bagong Lipunan | 481,489 | 9.59 |
| Alberto Veloso | Kilusang Bagong Lipunan | 418,156 | 8.33 |
| Fernando Veloso | Kilusang Bagong Lipunan | 412,904 | 8.23 |
| Artemio Mate | Kilusang Bagong Lipunan | 409,822 | 8.16 |
| Victor Amasa | Kilusang Bagong Lipunan | 393,642 | 7.84 |
| Edilberto del Valle | Kilusang Bagong Lipunan | 375,249 | 7.48 |
| Nicanor Yñiguez | Kilusang Bagong Lipunan | 373,034 | 7.43 |
| Emiliano Melgazo | Kilusang Bagong Lipunan | 356,068 | 7.09 |
| Damian Aldaba | Kilusang Bagong Lipunan | 353,559 | 7.04 |
| Terencio Tupaz | Independent | 206,257 | 4.11 |
| Julio Cabaluna | Independent | 200,043 | 3.99 |
| Agustin Arnaiz | Independent | 126,924 | 2.53 |
| Virgilio Alicer | Independent | 41,208 | 0.82 |
| Alejandro Faelnar | Independent | 33,179 | 0.66 |
| Claro Gofredo | Partido ng Bagong Pilipino | 14,262 | 0.28 |
| Usualdo Laguitan | Partido ng Bagong Pilipino | 13,075 | 0.26 |
| Total | | 5,019,485 | 100.00 |
| Total votes | | 998,451 | – |
| Registered voters/turnout | | 1,128,661 | 88.46 |

=== Region IX – Western Mindanao ===
| Candidate | Party | Votes | % |
|---|---|---|---|
| Joaquin Enriquez Jr. | Kilusang Bagong Lipunan | 433,177 | 8.24 |
| Antonio Ceniza | Kilusang Bagong Lipunan | 429,922 | 8.18 |
| Manuel Espaldon | Kilusang Bagong Lipunan | 409,801 | 7.79 |
| Celso Palma | Kilusang Bagong Lipunan | 394,055 | 7.50 |
| Guardson Lood | Kilusang Bagong Lipunan | 388,072 | 7.38 |
| Ulpiano Ramas | Kilusang Bagong Lipunan | 368,413 | 7.01 |
| Hussin Loong | Kilusang Bagong Lipunan | 343,780 | 6.54 |
| Kalbi Tupay | Kilusang Bagong Lipunan | 341,944 | 6.50 |
| Cesar Climaco | Concerned Citizens' Aggrupation | 297,467 | 5.66 |
| Benjamin Arao | Concerned Citizens' Aggrupation | 205,964 | 3.92 |
| Ramon Lim | Mindanao Alliance | 177,991 | 3.39 |
| Jorge Santos | Mindanao Alliance | 165,258 | 3.14 |
| Felipe Azcuna | Concerned Citizens' Aggrupation | 163,966 | 3.12 |
| Indanan Anni | Mindanao Alliance | 163,762 | 3.11 |
| Jesus Balicanta | Concerned Citizens' Aggrupation | 161,402 | 3.07 |
| Paulo Briones | Concerned Citizens' Aggrupation | 138,481 | 2.63 |
| Mohammad Edris | Concerned Citizens' Aggrupation | 138,465 | 2.63 |
| Brigido Tijamo | Concerned Citizens' Aggrupation | 136,592 | 2.60 |
| Alawaddin Bandon Jr. | Concerned Citizens' Aggrupation | 132,212 | 2.51 |
| Asbi Edding | Independent | 129,944 | 2.47 |
| Artemio Mata | Independent | 114,892 | 2.19 |
| Mohammad Musa | Independent | 9,785 | 0.19 |
| Antolin Bongcawei | Independent | 8,769 | 0.17 |
| Matarul Sasapan | Independent | 3,292 | 0.06 |
| Total | | 5,257,406 | 100.00 |
| Total votes | | 760,564 | – |
| Registered voters/turnout | | 976,458 | 77.89 |

=== Region X – Northern Mindanao ===
| Candidate | Party | Votes | % |
|---|---|---|---|
| Emmanuel Pelaez | Kilusang Bagong Lipunan | 543,336 | 7.00 |
| Carlos Fortich | Kilusang Bagong Lipunan | 500,619 | 6.45 |
| Constantino Navarro | Kilusang Bagong Lipunan | 495,328 | 6.38 |
| Antonio Tupaz | Kilusang Bagong Lipunan | 485,227 | 6.25 |
| Liliano Neri | Kilusang Bagong Lipunan | 485,050 | 6.25 |
| Henry Regalado | Kilusang Bagong Lipunan | 480,371 | 6.19 |
| Concordio Diel | Kilusang Bagong Lipunan | 480,359 | 6.19 |
| Edelmiro Amante | Kilusang Bagong Lipunan | 473,909 | 6.11 |
| Reuben Canoy | Mindanao Alliance | 459,896 | 5.93 |
| Antonio Dugenio | Kilusang Bagong Lipunan | 440,559 | 5.68 |
| Homobono Adaza | Mindanao Alliance | 406,543 | 5.24 |
| Rolando Geotina | Mindanao Alliance | 375,964 | 4.85 |
| Artemio Baluma | Mindanao Alliance | 339,098 | 4.37 |
| Pedro Romualdo | Mindanao Alliance | 334,143 | 4.31 |
| Jose Lim Jr. | Mindanao Alliance | 330,107 | 4.25 |
| Adolfo Murallon | Mindanao Alliance | 328,584 | 4.23 |
| Clementino Estella Jr. | Mindanao Alliance | 321,757 | 4.15 |
| Wilfredo Linaac | Mindanao Alliance | 316,135 | 4.07 |
| Caesar Calo | Independent | 38,135 | 0.49 |
| Antonio Edralin | Independent | 25,934 | 0.33 |
| Conrado Leonardo | Partido ng Bagong Pilipino | 21,066 | 0.27 |
| Marciano Cerna Jr. | Independent | 17,203 | 0.22 |
| Policaruso Busig | Independent | 13,333 | 0.17 |
| Epimaco Densing Jr. | Independent | 13,044 | 0.17 |
| Generoso Sansaet | Independent | 12,953 | 0.17 |
| Lucio Hingpit | Sovereign Citizens Party | 6,272 | 0.08 |
| Jose Leuterio | Independent | 6,031 | 0.08 |
| Rodulfo Ceniza | Independent | 5,824 | 0.08 |
| Simforoso Grana | Independent | 2,102 | 0.03 |
| Total | | 7,758,882 | 100.00 |
| Total votes | | 973,912 | – |
| Registered voters/turnout | | 1,148,572 | 84.79 |

=== Region XI – Southern Mindanao ===
| Candidate | Party | Votes | % |
|---|---|---|---|
| Jose Puyat | Kilusang Bagong Lipunan | 694,471 | 7.14 |
| Alejandro Almendras | Kilusang Bagong Lipunan | 682,204 | 7.01 |
| Rogelio Sarmiento | Kilusang Bagong Lipunan | 615,204 | 6.32 |
| Felicidad Santos | Kilusang Bagong Lipunan | 612,308 | 6.29 |
| Manuel Garcia | Kilusang Bagong Lipunan | 600,426 | 6.17 |
| Rodolfo del Rosario | Kilusang Bagong Lipunan | 594,278 | 6.11 |
| Jose Sison | Kilusang Bagong Lipunan | 574,019 | 5.90 |
| Benjamin Bautista | Kilusang Bagong Lipunan | 571,115 | 5.87 |
| Teodoro Palma Gil | Kilusang Bagong Lipunan | 551,287 | 5.67 |
| Jorge Royeca | Kilusang Bagong Lipunan | 532,058 | 5.47 |
| Cornelio Masakariño | Mindanao Alliance | 469,317 | 4.82 |
| Leonardo Tolentino | Mindanao Alliance | 428,467 | 4.40 |
| Dominador Carillo | Mindanao Alliance | 343,797 | 3.53 |
| Jesus Abear | Mindanao Alliance | 322,940 | 3.32 |
| Abbas Firdausi Ismail | Mindanao Alliance | 307,896 | 3.16 |
| Jesus Misa | Mindanao Alliance | 301,080 | 3.09 |
| Quirico Lim | Mindanao Alliance | 299,737 | 3.08 |
| Antonio Rafanan | Independent | 275,688 | 2.83 |
| Orlando Rimando | Mindanao Alliance | 260,232 | 2.67 |
| Leonardo Cocjin Jr. | Mindanao Alliance | 232,520 | 2.39 |
| Alfonso Escalona | Independent | 98,568 | 1.01 |
| Victor Clapano | Independent | 70,531 | 0.72 |
| Jesus Daffon | Independent | 51,747 | 0.53 |
| Angel Durano | Independent | 32,869 | 0.34 |
| Paterno Lomantas | Independent | 32,315 | 0.33 |
| Ruperto Garcia | Independent | 31,282 | 0.32 |
| Benjamin Cruzada | Independent | 29,142 | 0.30 |
| Antonio Acosta | Independent | 28,025 | 0.29 |
| Carlito Buntas | Independent | 27,210 | 0.28 |
| Abelardo Dajay | Independent | 20,130 | 0.21 |
| Gregorio Jover | Independent | 15,321 | 0.16 |
| Nerio Corvera | Independent | 13,032 | 0.13 |
| Mario Saga | Independent | 9,360 | 0.10 |
| Total | | 9,728,576 | 100.00 |
| Total votes | | 1,117,027 | – |
| Registered voters/turnout | | 1,354,922 | 82.44 |

=== Region XII – Central Mindanao ===
| Candidate | Party | Votes | % |
|---|---|---|---|
| Estanislao Valdez | Kilusang Bagong Lipunan | 319,514 | 7.79 |
| Abdullah D. Dimaporo | Bagong Lipunan-Kilusan ng Nagkakaisang Nacionalista, Liberal | 289,751 | 7.06 |
| Jesus Amparo | Kilusang Bagong Lipunan | 286,180 | 6.98 |
| Anacleto Badoy Jr. | Kilusang Bagong Lipunan | 285,985 | 6.97 |
| Tomas Baga Jr. | Kilusang Bagong Lipunan | 271,473 | 6.62 |
| Ahdel Sambulayang Pangandaman | Kilusang Bagong Lipunan | 271,393 | 6.62 |
| Blah T. Sinsuat | Kilusang Bagong Lipunan | 269,905 | 6.58 |
| Ernesto Roldan | Independent | 268,287 | 6.54 |
| Linang Mandangan | Independent | 251,226 | 6.12 |
| Sergio Tocao | Nacionalista Party | 229,224 | 5.59 |
| Ciscolario Diaz | Independent | 187,986 | 4.58 |
| Tomatic Aratuc | Independent | 183,316 | 4.47 |
| Fred Tamula | Nacionalista Party | 177,270 | 4.32 |
| Bonifacio Legaspi | Independent | 171,564 | 4.18 |
| Mangontawar Guro | Nacionalista Party | 163,449 | 3.98 |
| Nemesio Loma | Independent | 129,450 | 3.16 |
| Malamama Macapeges | Independent | 116,651 | 2.84 |
| Wilfredo Jolipa | Nacionalista Party | 109,097 | 2.66 |
| Hadji Hassan Tiboron | Independent | 39,648 | 0.97 |
| Felipe Balingit | Independent | 39,624 | 0.97 |
| Bartolome Presto | Kilusang Bagong Lipunan | 22,212 | 0.54 |
| Darosalam Maongco | Samahan Nayon and Cooperative | 12,542 | 0.31 |
| Nimbalawag Barani | Independent | 6,415 | 0.16 |
| Total | | 4,102,162 | 100.00 |
| Total votes | | 779,246 | – |
| Registered voters/turnout | | 956,234 | 81.49 |

== By sector ==
=== Youth sector ===
==== Luzon ====
| Candidate | Votes | % |
|---|---|---|
| Danilo Concepcion | 61 | 37.20 |
| Rogelio Peyuan | 58 | 35.37 |
| Rizaldy Villaseñor | 17 | 10.37 |
| Leila de Lima | 12 | 7.32 |
| Allyson Erwin Bautista | 9 | 5.49 |
| Raena-Lilma Nieva | 2 | 1.22 |
| Ray Bachiller | 1 | 0.61 |
| Jay De Castro | 1 | 0.61 |
| Marie Louise Guan | 1 | 0.61 |
| Nazario Gutierrez | 1 | 0.61 |
| Susan Marquez | 1 | 0.61 |
| Armando Aguja | 0 | 0.00 |
| Cornelio Ajon | 0 | 0.00 |
| Oscar de la Cruz | 0 | 0.00 |
| Maria Rosario De Vera | 0 | 0.00 |
| Cesar Gutierrez | 0 | 0.00 |
| Mars Medina | 0 | 0.00 |
| Clarito Miranda | 0 | 0.00 |
| Arman Niedao | 0 | 0.00 |
| Maria Betty Ras | 0 | 0.00 |
| Edwin Samson | 0 | 0.00 |
| Tolentino Torres | 0 | 0.00 |
| Horacio Villarette | 0 | 0.00 |
| Maria Gracia Yllana | 0 | 0.00 |
| Rodolfo Zuluaga | 0 | 0.00 |
| Total | 164 | 100.00 |

==== Visayas ====
| Candidate | Votes | % |
|---|---|---|
| Luisito Patalinhug | 64 | 78.05 |
| Juanito De Veyra | 17 | 20.73 |
| Renecito Novero | 1 | 1.22 |
| Total | 82 | 100.00 |

==== Mindanao ====
| Candidate | Votes | % |
|---|---|---|
| Nurodin Mamaluba | 56 | 65.88 |
| Diosdado Angelo Mahipus | 16 | 18.82 |
| Rufus Rodriguez | 5 | 5.88 |
| Henry Oaminal | 4 | 4.71 |
| Omar Basiri | 2 | 2.35 |
| Melinda Antao | 2 | 2.35 |
| Paladan Abdul Cader Badron | 0 | 0.00 |
| Ephraim Defino | 0 | 0.00 |
| Frankie Gomez | 0 | 0.00 |
| Martiniano Ignacio | 0 | 0.00 |
| Nueva Gracia Tamargo | 0 | 0.00 |
| Total | 85 | 100.00 |

==== Any region ====
| Candidate | Votes | % |
|---|---|---|
| Judy Carunungan | 58 | 36.94 |
| Macairog Aznar | 40 | 25.48 |
| Catherine Singson | 24 | 15.29 |
| Cecil Carag | 15 | 9.55 |
| Teodoro Sabugaa | 9 | 5.73 |
| Genefel Blanco | 8 | 5.10 |
| Bernardo Tensuan | 3 | 1.91 |
| Total | 157 | 100.00 |

=== Industrial labor sector ===
==== Luzon ====
| Candidate | Votes | % |
|---|---|---|
| Ruben De Ocampo | 51 | 30.00 |
| Eulogio Lerum | 42 | 24.71 |
| Alejandro Suansing | 16 | 9.41 |
| Antonio Manikan | 15 | 8.82 |
| Cesar Legayada | 11 | 6.47 |
| Roy Padilla | 10 | 5.88 |
| Florencio Moreno Sr. | 5 | 2.94 |
| Antonio Policarpio | 4 | 2.35 |
| Dante Quirino | 4 | 2.35 |
| Oliver Lozano | 4 | 2.35 |
| Leonardo Quisumbing | 2 | 1.18 |
| Vicente Rafael | 2 | 1.18 |
| Antonio Diaz | 1 | 0.59 |
| Onofre Guevara | 1 | 0.59 |
| Daniel Romana | 1 | 0.59 |
| Simeon Valdez | 1 | 0.59 |
| Don Rustico Badilla | 0 | 0.00 |
| Elena Cuevas | 0 | 0.00 |
| Bert Fuentes | 0 | 0.00 |
| Gabriel Gatchalian | 0 | 0.00 |
| Ceferino Ginete | 0 | 0.00 |
| Guillermo Mercado | 0 | 0.00 |
| Milagros de Guia Mercado | 0 | 0.00 |
| Ricardo Parreñas | 0 | 0.00 |
| Manuel Santa Cruz | 0 | 0.00 |
| Amancio Sumabat | 0 | 0.00 |
| Nilo Tayag | 0 | 0.00 |
| Rafael Ungria | 0 | 0.00 |
| Eulogio Maria Viray | 0 | 0.00 |
| Total | 170 | 100.00 |

==== Visayas ====
| Candidate | Votes | % |
|---|---|---|
| Januario Seno | 66 | 81.48 |
| Reynaldo Edralin | 13 | 16.05 |
| Jose Villasin | 2 | 2.47 |
| Arturo Rivera | 0 | 0.00 |
| Total | 81 | 100.00 |

==== Mindanao ====
| Candidate | Votes | % |
|---|---|---|
| Princess Potri Pacasum | 39 | 44.32 |
| Rudolfo Fernandez | 38 | 43.18 |
| Patricio Espinosa | 4 | 4.55 |
| Abdullah Mamao | 4 | 4.55 |
| Godofredo Paceño Sr. | 3 | 3.41 |
| Sergio Custodio | 0 | 0.00 |
| Cipriano Malonzo | 0 | 0.00 |
| Maximo Nuñez | 0 | 0.00 |
| Gregorio Pizarro | 0 | 0.00 |
| Jaime Rincal | 0 | 0.00 |
| Ludivico Viajar | 0 | 0.00 |
| Total | 88 | 100.00 |

=== Agricultural labor sector ===
==== Luzon ====
| Candidate | Votes | % |
|---|---|---|
| Luis Taruc | 53 | 33.54 |
| Jose Cervantes | 25 | 15.82 |
| Faustino Magadia | 24 | 15.19 |
| Macario Fabian | 19 | 12.03 |
| Rufino Luistro | 13 | 8.23 |
| Victorio Aguilar | 10 | 6.33 |
| Aldegundo Cayosa | 7 | 4.43 |
| Jesus Ayo | 4 | 2.53 |
| Infante Calaycay | 2 | 1.27 |
| Jose Lozada | 1 | 0.63 |
| Miguel Baluyot | 0 | 0.00 |
| Leoneio Co | 0 | 0.00 |
| Arnulfo Garcia | 0 | 0.00 |
| Lope Garcia | 0 | 0.00 |
| Oswaldo Macadangdang | 0 | 0.00 |
| Filemon Sison | 0 | 0.00 |
| Florencio Tamargo | 0 | 0.00 |
| Fabio Velasco | 0 | 0.00 |
| Total | 158 | 100.00 |

==== Visayas ====
| Candidate | Votes | % |
|---|---|---|
| Rolando Bayot | 58 | 67.44 |
| Rebecca Barbusa | 21 | 24.42 |
| Laurentino Baseug | 5 | 5.81 |
| Antonio Jayobo | 2 | 2.33 |
| Manolito Asok | 0 | 0.00 |
| Vito Barcelo | 0 | 0.00 |
| Vicente Convite Sr. | 0 | 0.00 |
| Nestor Dequina | 0 | 0.00 |
| Bernardo Remo | 0 | 0.00 |
| Romeo Seugay | 0 | 0.00 |
| Total | 86 | 100.00 |

==== Mindanao ====
| Candidate | Votes | % |
|---|---|---|
| Jiamil Ismael Dianalan | 45 | 50.56 |
| John Tocao Hofer | 19 | 21.35 |
| Arturo Ramirez | 12 | 13.48 |
| Ramon Blancia | 5 | 5.62 |
| Severino Litera Sr. | 5 | 5.62 |
| Glicerio Tan | 2 | 2.25 |
| Vicente Guzman | 1 | 1.12 |
| Teodoro Canoy | 0 | 0.00 |
| Temostocles Dejon | 0 | 0.00 |
| Adriano Manglicmot | 0 | 0.00 |
| Cecilio Martin | 0 | 0.00 |
| Romeo Mejia | 0 | 0.00 |
| Romeo Occena | 0 | 0.00 |
| Redeemer Valmores | 0 | 0.00 |
| Total | 89 | 100.00 |
