= Region VII's at-large parliamentary district =

Former Philippine parliamentary district

- Former constituency for the Interim Batasang Pambansa

Former constituency
- Created: 1978
- Abolished: 1984
- Seats: 13

Region VII's at-large parliamentary district (also known as Central Visayas's at-large parliamentary district) was a constituency for the Interim Batasang Pambansa, the legislature of the Philippines from 1978 to 1984. It encompassed the provinces of Bohol, Cebu, Negros Oriental and Siquijor, together with the cities of Bais, Canlaon, Cebu, Danao, Dumaguete, Lapu-Lapu, Mandaue, Tagbilaran, and Toledo.

The district had 13 seats in the assembly, all of which were held by members of the local Visayan opposition party Pusyon Bisaya.

== List of assemblymen representing the district ==
=== Batasang Pambansa (1978–1986) ===
Portrait	Member (Lifespan) (Province/City)	Term of office	Party	Legislature	Electoral history	Constituencies
District established February 7, 1978.
	Natalio Bacalso (1908–1984) (Cebu City)	June 12, 1978 – March 30, 1984 (Note: Died in office.)	Pusyon Bisaya	Interim Batasang Pambansa	Elected in 1978. Died.	1978–1984; Provinces: Bohol, Cebu, Negros Oriental, Siquijor Cities: Bais, Canlaon, Cebu, Danao, Dumaguete, Lapu-Lapu, Mandaue, Tagbilaran, Toledo
	Bartolome Cabangbang (1917–1985) (Bohol)	June 12, 1978 – June 30, 1984	Pusyon Bisaya	Interim Batasang Pambansa	Elected in 1978.	1978–1984; Provinces: Bohol, Cebu, Negros Oriental, Siquijor Cities: Bais, Canlaon, Cebu, Danao, Dumaguete, Lapu-Lapu, Mandaue, Tagbilaran, Toledo
	Eutiquio C. Cimafranca (1925–1984) (Tagbilaran City)	June 12, 1978 – June 8, 1984	Pusyon Bisaya	Interim Batasang Pambansa	Elected in 1978. Died.	1978–1984; Provinces: Bohol, Cebu, Negros Oriental, Siquijor Cities: Bais, Canlaon, Cebu, Danao, Dumaguete, Lapu-Lapu, Mandaue, Tagbilaran, Toledo
	Alfonso N. Corominas Jr. (1928–2016) (Cebu City)	June 12, 1978 – June 30, 1984	Pusyon Bisaya	Interim Batasang Pambansa	Elected in 1978.	1978–1984; Provinces: Bohol, Cebu, Negros Oriental, Siquijor Cities: Bais, Canlaon, Cebu, Danao, Dumaguete, Lapu-Lapu, Mandaue, Tagbilaran, Toledo
	Hilario Davide Jr. (born 1935) (Cebu City)	June 12, 1978 – June 30, 1984	Pusyon Bisaya	Interim Batasang Pambansa	Elected in 1978.	1978–1984; Provinces: Bohol, Cebu, Negros Oriental, Siquijor Cities: Bais, Canlaon, Cebu, Danao, Dumaguete, Lapu-Lapu, Mandaue, Tagbilaran, Toledo
	Filemon L. Fernandez (born 1938) (Mandaue City)	June 12, 1978 – June 30, 1984	Pusyon Bisaya	Interim Batasang Pambansa	Elected in 1978.	1978–1984; Provinces: Bohol, Cebu, Negros Oriental, Siquijor Cities: Bais, Canlaon, Cebu, Danao, Dumaguete, Lapu-Lapu, Mandaue, Tagbilaran, Toledo
	Jorge M. Kintanar (1924–) (Cebu)	June 12, 1978 – June 30, 1984	Pusyon Bisaya	Interim Batasang Pambansa	Elected in 1978.	1978–1984; Provinces: Bohol, Cebu, Negros Oriental, Siquijor Cities: Bais, Canlaon, Cebu, Danao, Dumaguete, Lapu-Lapu, Mandaue, Tagbilaran, Toledo
	Valentino L. Legaspi (1928–) (Cebu City)	June 12, 1978 – June 30, 1984	Pusyon Bisaya	Interim Batasang Pambansa	Elected in 1978.	1978–1984; Provinces: Bohol, Cebu, Negros Oriental, Siquijor Cities: Bais, Canlaon, Cebu, Danao, Dumaguete, Lapu-Lapu, Mandaue, Tagbilaran, Toledo
	Mariano R. Logarta (1928–2004) (Cebu City)	June 12, 1978 – June 30, 1984	Pusyon Bisaya	Interim Batasang Pambansa	Elected in 1978.	1978–1984; Provinces: Bohol, Cebu, Negros Oriental, Siquijor Cities: Bais, Canlaon, Cebu, Danao, Dumaguete, Lapu-Lapu, Mandaue, Tagbilaran, Toledo
	Enrique L. Medina Jr. (1900–1988) (Negros Oriental)	June 12, 1978 – June 30, 1984	Pusyon Bisaya	Interim Batasang Pambansa	Elected in 1978.	1978–1984; Provinces: Bohol, Cebu, Negros Oriental, Siquijor Cities: Bais, Canlaon, Cebu, Danao, Dumaguete, Lapu-Lapu, Mandaue, Tagbilaran, Toledo
	Dominador M. Pernes (1926–1997) (Siquijor)	June 12, 1978 – June 30, 1984	Pusyon Bisaya	Interim Batasang Pambansa	Elected in 1978.	1978–1984; Provinces: Bohol, Cebu, Negros Oriental, Siquijor Cities: Bais, Canlaon, Cebu, Danao, Dumaguete, Lapu-Lapu, Mandaue, Tagbilaran, Toledo
	Jesus L. Villegas (1932–) (Negros Oriental)	June 12, 1978 – June 30, 1984	Pusyon Bisaya	Interim Batasang Pambansa	Elected in 1978.	1978–1984; Provinces: Bohol, Cebu, Negros Oriental, Siquijor Cities: Bais, Canlaon, Cebu, Danao, Dumaguete, Lapu-Lapu, Mandaue, Tagbilaran, Toledo
	Julian B. Yballe (1909–2001) (Cebu City)	June 12, 1978 – June 30, 1984	Pusyon Bisaya	Interim Batasang Pambansa	Elected in 1978.	1978–1984; Provinces: Bohol, Cebu, Negros Oriental, Siquijor Cities: Bais, Canlaon, Cebu, Danao, Dumaguete, Lapu-Lapu, Mandaue, Tagbilaran, Toledo
District dissolved into Bohol's at-large, Cebu's at-large, Cebu City's at-large, Negros Oriental's at-large, and Siquijor's at-large districts.

== Election results ==
=== 1978 ===
Candidate	Party	Votes	%
Jorge M. Kintanar	Pusyon Bisaya	785,565	4.55
Natalio Bacalso	Pusyon Bisaya	777,884	4.51
Bartolome Cabangbang	Pusyon Bisaya	775,572	4.49
Filemon L. Fernandez	Pusyon Bisaya	762,017	4.42
Hilario Davide Jr.	Pusyon Bisaya	751,173	4.35
Valentino L. Legaspi	Pusyon Bisaya	733,346	4.25
Jesus L. Villegas	Pusyon Bisaya	731,072	4.24
Julian B. Yballe	Pusyon Bisaya	720,232	4.17
Mariano R. Logarta	Pusyon Bisaya	718,542	4.16
Eutiquio C. Cimafranca	Pusyon Bisaya	698,471	4.05
Enrique L. Medina Jr.	Pusyon Bisaya	687,402	3.98
Alfonso N. Corominas Jr.	Pusyon Bisaya	685,949	3.97
Dominador M. Pernes	Pusyon Bisaya	668,191	3.87
Eduardo Gullas	KBL	634,315	3.68
Lito Osmeña	KBL	621,589	3.60
Antonio Cuenco	KBL	606,446	3.51
Ramon Durano III	KBL	603,499	3.50
Gonzalo O. Catan Jr.	KBL	585,551	3.39
Tomas C. Toledo	KBL	582,240	3.37
Emerito S. Calderon	KBL	575,861	3.34
Rene Espina	KBL	574,710	3.33
Pablo P. Garcia	KBL	569,440	3.30
Victor S. dela Serna	KBL	568,298	3.29
Andres C. Bustamante	KBL	552,240	3.20
Lino I. Chatto	KBL	551,004	3.19
Romulo R. Senining	KBL	548,738	3.18
Jose S. Amadora	Partido Democrata	20,409	0.12
Caridad A. Trocino	Partido Democrata	16,347	0.09
Narciso L. Aliño Jr.	Partido Democrata	15,641	0.09
Leodegario Cañete	Independent	13,757	0.08
Antonio Vicencio Jr.	Independent	12,492	0.07
Roso Sabalones	Independent	10,838	0.06
Antonio Alvarez	Independent	10,726	0.06
Danilo Gonzales	LABAN	9,362	0.05
Teotimo Monteclar	Partido Democrata	8,770	0.05
Emilio Lumontad Jr.	Partido Democrata	8,421	0.05
Manuel Maranga	Partido Democrata	8,019	0.05
Jose Echaves	Partido Democrata	7,542	0.04
Basilio Duaban	Partido Democrata	7,527	0.04
Diomedes Cane	Partido Democrata	7,228	0.04
Florencio Bajarias	Partido Democrata	6,194	0.04
Rodisendo Sabanal	Partido Democrata	5,042	0.03
Narciso Pepito	Independent	4,291	0.02
Jesus Echavez	Independent	3,359	0.02
Salvador Barrameda	Independent	2,320	0.01
Bibiano Rivera	Independent	1,862	0.01
Glicerio Cavalida	Independent	1,581	0.01
Ruben Cloma	Independent	1,577	0.01
Manuel Seco	Independent	1,235	0.01
Agustin Sepulveda	Independent	1,152	0.01
Orlando Labra	Independent	1,149	0.01
Zacarias Campaner	Independent	1,081	0.01
Anselmo Pantinople	Independent	642	0.00
Jose Pantorilla	Independent	433	0.00
Total		17,258,344	100.00
Total votes		1,508,799	–
Registered voters/turnout		1,716,009	87.92
