= Natalio Bacalso =

Filipino writer and politician (1908–1984)

Mambabatas Pambansa (Assemblyman) from Region VII
- In office June 12, 1978 – June 5, 1984

Personal details
- Born: December 1, 1908 Inayawan, Pardo, Cebu
- Died: March 30, 1984 (aged 75) Manila
- Party: Pusyon Bisaya
- Writing career
- Occupations: Constitutional Convention Delegate; Interim Batasang Pambansa assemblyman; Writer; Filmmaker; Radio Broadcaster; Newspaperman
- Pen name: Talyux
- Language: Cebuano

Natalio Bacus Bacalso (December 1, 1908 – March 30, 1984) was a Filipino writer, newspaperman, radio broadcaster, filmmaker, Constitutional Convention delegate in 1971 representing Cebu's 2nd district, and opposition assemblyman to the Interim Batasang Pambansa in 1978. The Natalio Bacalso Avenue is named after him. On June 13, 2019, The Freeman recognized him as one of the Top 100 Cebuanos.

== Early life ==
He was born in Inayawan, Cebu, which at the time of his birth in 1908, was part of Pardo.

== Literature and journalism ==
Bacalso edited the Cebuano periodicals Bisaya from 1932 to 1934 and Manila-printed periodical Lamdag of Malayan Publishing Company (renamed Filipinas Publishing Company). He was the founder of Tabunon, a Manila-printed periodical published by Mariano Jesus Cuenco. Known with his pseudonym "Talyux", he published Cadena de Amor, a collection of stories, together with Fausto Dugenio.

In 1947, Bacalso together with Vicente del Rosario was sued for libel filed separately by then Cebu municipal councilor Marcos Morelos and Mayor Dr. Luis Espina. The complaint was about an article Bacalso published alleging Espina and Morelos for various wrongdoings. The Supreme Court, upon the appeal by Morelos whose complaint in the local court was dismissed, reversed the ruling and sent it back to the local court.

== Radio ==
Moreover, Bacalso was a noted broadcaster and hailed as Cebu's prominent radio commentator in his time. His radio program broadcast, which were aired in radio stations DYRC and DYSS, was transmitted in Visayas and Mindanao and enjoyed ratings between 80% and 90% among Cebuano-speaking provinces.

== Politics ==
Bacalso was a political orator of Mariano Jesus Cuenco and Sergio Osmeña Jr. He was also an officer in the Malacañang Press Office, and he campaigned for Ferdinand Marcos under the Nacionalista Party in the 1965 Philippine presidential election.

=== 1969 Philippine presidential election ===
However, he defected from the administration before the start of the 1969 Philippine presidential election and supported the opposition standard bearer, Sergio Osmeña Jr. of the Liberal Party. The popularity of his show and his talent for radio commentary undermined the Marcos' candidacy in Visayas and Mindanao and prompted belated efforts to persuade him to switch loyalty back to the administration.

=== 1971 Constitutional Convention ===
On November 10, 1970, he was elected as delegate to represent Cebu's 2nd district (then composed of Cebu City, Mandaue, Consolacion, Liloan, Compostela, Cordova, and Lapu-Lapu City) during the 1970 Philippine Constitutional Convention election. The Constitutional Convention of 1971 was tasked to amend the 1935 Constitution.

=== Pusyon Bisaya ===
By 1972, Marcos declared martial law in the country and remained president by virtue of transitory provisions in the 1973 Constitution that called for Marcos to convene an interim National Assembly in a shift towards parliamentary form of government, which he never did. In 1976, he called for a referendum to ratify amendments to the 1973 Constitution. The 1978 Philippine parliamentary election was the first national election to create a legislative body called Interim Batasang Pambansa (IBP) during the Marcos dictatorship, and administration bets campaigned under the Kilusang Bagong Lipunan.

The opposition party, Lakas ng Bayan, fielded candidates that included Ninoy Aquino, and in Central Visayas, Natalio Bacalso led the local opposition party Pusyon Bisaya together with 12 other candidates that included Fr. Jorge Kintanar, Hilario Davide Jr., Valentino Legaspi, Filemon Fernandez, Mariano Logarta, Alfonso Corominas, Julian Yballe, Eutiquio Cimafranca, Jesus Villegas, Jun Medina, Dominador Pernes and Bartolome Cabangbang. During his campaign speeches, Bacalso exposed the ills and human rights abuses of the Marcos regime. He was elected as assemblyman to the Interim Batasang Pambansa, Mariano Logarta became the minority leader, and Pusyon Bisaya won all 13 seats in Central Visayas region.

== Filmography ==
Bacalso was nominated for Best Director in the 1956 FAMAS Awards for the film Salingsing sa Kasakit (literal translation: The Pangs of Pain). Among the films he directed were:

- Mutya sa Saging Tindok (The Plantain's Gem)
- Magdalena
- Alimatok (The Leech)

== Death ==
Bacalso died on March 30, 1984, at the age of 76.

== Historical commemoration ==
On March 7, 1984, the Natalio Bacalso Avenue was named in his honor by virtue of the Batas Pambansa Bilang 684. Regarded as Cebu's longest road, it starts from Leon Kilat Street and ends in Santander, Cebu.
