= Region IV's at-large parliamentary district =

Former Philippine parliamentary district

- Former constituency for the Interim Batasang Pambansa

Former constituency
- Created: 1978
- Abolished: 1984
- Seats: 21

Region IV's at-large parliamentary district (also known as Metro Manila's at-large parliamentary district) was a constituency for the Interim Batasang Pambansa, the legislature of the Philippines from 1978 to 1984. It encompassed the whole Metro Manila, comprising the cities Caloocan, Manila, Pasay, and Quezon, and the municipalities of Las Piñas, Makati, Malabon, Mandaluyong, Marikina, Muntinlupa, Navotas, Parañaque, Pasig, Pateros, San Juan, Taguig, and Valenzuela.

The district had 21 seats in the assembly, all of which were held by members of the ruling party Kilusang Bagong Lipunan.

== List of assemblymen representing the district ==
=== Batasang Pambansa (1978–1984) ===
Portrait	Member (Lifespan)	Term of office	Party	Legislature	Electoral history	Constituencies
District established February 7, 1978.
	Emilio Abello Sr. (1906–1982)	June 12, 1978 – May 18, 1982 (Note: Died in office.)	KBL	Interim Batasang Pambansa	Elected in 1978. Died.	1978–1984; Cities: Caloocan, Manila, Pasay, Quezon Municipalities: Las Piñas, Makati, Malabon, Mandaluyong, Marikina, Muntinlupa, Navotas, Parañaque, Pasig, Pateros, San Juan, Taguig, Valenzuela
	Estanislao Alinea Jr.	June 12, 1978 – June 30, 1984	KBL	Interim Batasang Pambansa	Elected in 1978.	1978–1984; Cities: Caloocan, Manila, Pasay, Quezon Municipalities: Las Piñas, Makati, Malabon, Mandaluyong, Marikina, Muntinlupa, Navotas, Parañaque, Pasig, Pateros, San Juan, Taguig, Valenzuela
	Jose P. Bengzon (1898–1990)	June 12, 1978 – June 30, 1984	KBL	Interim Batasang Pambansa	Elected in 1978.	1978–1984; Cities: Caloocan, Manila, Pasay, Quezon Municipalities: Las Piñas, Makati, Malabon, Mandaluyong, Marikina, Muntinlupa, Navotas, Parañaque, Pasig, Pateros, San Juan, Taguig, Valenzuela
	Jose Conrado "Joly" Benitez (1943–2015)	June 12, 1978 – June 30, 1984	KBL	Interim Batasang Pambansa	Elected in 1978.	1978–1984; Cities: Caloocan, Manila, Pasay, Quezon Municipalities: Las Piñas, Makati, Malabon, Mandaluyong, Marikina, Muntinlupa, Navotas, Parañaque, Pasig, Pateros, San Juan, Taguig, Valenzuela
	Manuel Camara	June 12, 1978 – June 30, 1984	KBL	Interim Batasang Pambansa	Elected in 1978.	1978–1984; Cities: Caloocan, Manila, Pasay, Quezon Municipalities: Las Piñas, Makati, Malabon, Mandaluyong, Marikina, Muntinlupa, Navotas, Parañaque, Pasig, Pateros, San Juan, Taguig, Valenzuela
	Fred J. Elizalde (born 1940)	June 12, 1978 – June 30, 1984	KBL	Interim Batasang Pambansa	Elected in 1978.	1978–1984; Cities: Caloocan, Manila, Pasay, Quezon Municipalities: Las Piñas, Makati, Malabon, Mandaluyong, Marikina, Muntinlupa, Navotas, Parañaque, Pasig, Pateros, San Juan, Taguig, Valenzuela
	Gerardo Espina Sr. (1935–2013)	June 12, 1978 – June 30, 1984	KBL	Interim Batasang Pambansa	Elected in 1978.	1978–1984; Cities: Caloocan, Manila, Pasay, Quezon Municipalities: Las Piñas, Makati, Malabon, Mandaluyong, Marikina, Muntinlupa, Navotas, Parañaque, Pasig, Pateros, San Juan, Taguig, Valenzuela
	Alejandro Fider	June 12, 1978 – June 30, 1984	KBL	Interim Batasang Pambansa	Elected in 1978.	1978–1984; Cities: Caloocan, Manila, Pasay, Quezon Municipalities: Las Piñas, Makati, Malabon, Mandaluyong, Marikina, Muntinlupa, Navotas, Parañaque, Pasig, Pateros, San Juan, Taguig, Valenzuela
	Pablo Floro	June 12, 1978 – June 30, 1984	KBL	Interim Batasang Pambansa	Elected in 1978.	1978–1984; Cities: Caloocan, Manila, Pasay, Quezon Municipalities: Las Piñas, Makati, Malabon, Mandaluyong, Marikina, Muntinlupa, Navotas, Parañaque, Pasig, Pateros, San Juan, Taguig, Valenzuela
	Eddie Ilarde (1934–2020)	June 12, 1978 – June 30, 1984	KBL	Interim Batasang Pambansa	Elected in 1978.	1978–1984; Cities: Caloocan, Manila, Pasay, Quezon Municipalities: Las Piñas, Makati, Malabon, Mandaluyong, Marikina, Muntinlupa, Navotas, Parañaque, Pasig, Pateros, San Juan, Taguig, Valenzuela
	Querube Makalintal (1910–2002)	June 12, 1978 – June 30, 1984	KBL	Interim Batasang Pambansa	Elected in 1978.	1978–1984; Cities: Caloocan, Manila, Pasay, Quezon Municipalities: Las Piñas, Makati, Malabon, Mandaluyong, Marikina, Muntinlupa, Navotas, Parañaque, Pasig, Pateros, San Juan, Taguig, Valenzuela
	Imelda Marcos (born 1929)	June 12, 1978 – June 30, 1984	KBL	Interim Batasang Pambansa	Elected in 1978.	1978–1984; Cities: Caloocan, Manila, Pasay, Quezon Municipalities: Las Piñas, Makati, Malabon, Mandaluyong, Marikina, Muntinlupa, Navotas, Parañaque, Pasig, Pateros, San Juan, Taguig, Valenzuela
	Roberto Oca Jr. (1945–2009)	June 12, 1978 – June 30, 1984	KBL	Interim Batasang Pambansa	Elected in 1978.	1978–1984; Cities: Caloocan, Manila, Pasay, Quezon Municipalities: Las Piñas, Makati, Malabon, Mandaluyong, Marikina, Muntinlupa, Navotas, Parañaque, Pasig, Pateros, San Juan, Taguig, Valenzuela
	Vicente Paterno (1925–2014)	June 12, 1978 – June 30, 1984	KBL	Interim Batasang Pambansa	Elected in 1978.	1978–1984; Cities: Caloocan, Manila, Pasay, Quezon Municipalities: Las Piñas, Makati, Malabon, Mandaluyong, Marikina, Muntinlupa, Navotas, Parañaque, Pasig, Pateros, San Juan, Taguig, Valenzuela
	Waldo Perfecto (1925–1980)	June 12, 1978 – August 16, 1980	KBL	Interim Batasang Pambansa	Elected in 1978. Died.	1978–1984; Cities: Caloocan, Manila, Pasay, Quezon Municipalities: Las Piñas, Makati, Malabon, Mandaluyong, Marikina, Muntinlupa, Navotas, Parañaque, Pasig, Pateros, San Juan, Taguig, Valenzuela
	Ricardo Puno (1923–2018)	June 12, 1978 – June 30, 1984	KBL	Interim Batasang Pambansa	Elected in 1978.	1978–1984; Cities: Caloocan, Manila, Pasay, Quezon Municipalities: Las Piñas, Makati, Malabon, Mandaluyong, Marikina, Muntinlupa, Navotas, Parañaque, Pasig, Pateros, San Juan, Taguig, Valenzuela
	Rogelio Quiambao	June 12, 1978 – June 30, 1984	KBL	Interim Batasang Pambansa	Elected in 1978.	1978–1984; Cities: Caloocan, Manila, Pasay, Quezon Municipalities: Las Piñas, Makati, Malabon, Mandaluyong, Marikina, Muntinlupa, Navotas, Parañaque, Pasig, Pateros, San Juan, Taguig, Valenzuela
	Carlos P. Romulo (1899–1985)	June 12, 1978 – June 30, 1984	KBL	Interim Batasang Pambansa	Elected in 1978.	1978–1984; Cities: Caloocan, Manila, Pasay, Quezon Municipalities: Las Piñas, Makati, Malabon, Mandaluyong, Marikina, Muntinlupa, Navotas, Parañaque, Pasig, Pateros, San Juan, Taguig, Valenzuela
	Januario Soller Jr.	June 12, 1978 – June 30, 1984	KBL	Interim Batasang Pambansa	Elected in 1978.	1978–1984; Cities: Caloocan, Manila, Pasay, Quezon Municipalities: Las Piñas, Makati, Malabon, Mandaluyong, Marikina, Muntinlupa, Navotas, Parañaque, Pasig, Pateros, San Juan, Taguig, Valenzuela
	Arturo Tolentino (1910–2004)	June 12, 1978 – June 30, 1984	KBL	Interim Batasang Pambansa	Elected in 1978.	1978–1984; Cities: Caloocan, Manila, Pasay, Quezon Municipalities: Las Piñas, Makati, Malabon, Mandaluyong, Marikina, Muntinlupa, Navotas, Parañaque, Pasig, Pateros, San Juan, Taguig, Valenzuela
	Ronaldo Zamora (born 1944)	June 12, 1978 – June 30, 1984	KBL	Interim Batasang Pambansa	Elected in 1978.	1978–1984; Cities: Caloocan, Manila, Pasay, Quezon Municipalities: Las Piñas, Makati, Malabon, Mandaluyong, Marikina, Muntinlupa, Navotas, Parañaque, Pasig, Pateros, San Juan, Taguig, Valenzuela
District dissolved into Caloocan's at-large, Las Piñas–Parañaque's at-large, Makati's at-large, Malabon–Navotas–Valenzuela's at-large, Manila's at-large, Pasay's at-large, Pasig–Marikina's at-large, Quezon City's at-large, San Juan–Mandaluyong's at-large, Taguig–Pateros–Muntinlupa's at-large at-large districts.

== Election results ==
=== 1978 ===
Candidate	Party	Votes	%
Imelda Marcos	KBL	1,795,120	3.24
Carlos P. Romulo	KBL	1,771,272	3.20
Arturo Tolentino	KBL	1,757,636	3.17
Eddie Ilarde	KBL	1,748,368	3.15
Fred J. Elizalde	KBL	1,690,033	3.05
Gerardo Espina Sr.	KBL	1,647,240	2.97
Querube Makalintal	KBL	1,600,800	2.89
Vicente Paterno	KBL	1,591,721	2.87
Ronaldo Zamora	KBL	1,588,642	2.87
Jose Conrado Benitez	KBL	1,585,816	2.86
Ricardo C. Puno	KBL	1,579,435	2.85
Jose Bengzon	KBL	1,565,450	2.82
Roberto Oca Jr.	KBL	1,563,291	2.82
Emilio Abello Sr.	KBL	1,542,888	2.78
Januario Soller Jr.	KBL	1,536,935	2.77
Pablo Floro	KBL	1,522,657	2.75
Alejandro Fider	KBL	1,512,108	2.73
Manuel Camara	KBL	1,504,981	2.72
Estanislao Alinea Jr.	KBL	1,485,247	2.68
Rogelio Quiambao	KBL	1,471,543	2.66
Waldo Perfecto	KBL	1,453,430	2.62
Ninoy Aquino	LABAN	1,219,893	2.20
Soc Rodrigo	LABAN	1,183,340	2.14
Ramon Mitra Jr.	LABAN	1,179,529	2.13
Ernesto Maceda	LABAN	1,157,648	2.09
Alejandro Roces	LABAN	1,140,817	2.06
Rosario "Charito" Planas	LABAN	1,133,483	2.05
Neptali Gonzales	LABAN	1,103,817	1.99
Jaime Ferrer	LABAN	1,052,836	1.90
Cesar Lucero	LABAN	1,018,723	1.84
Juan David	LABAN	994,553	1.79
Felicisimo Cabigao	LABAN	992,457	1.79
Fernando "Jerry" Barican	LABAN	987,809	1.78
Napoleon Rama	LABAN	977,148	1.76
Aquilino Pimentel Jr.	LABAN	948,725	1.71
Teofisto Guingona Jr.	LABAN	943,820	1.70
Antonio Martinez	LABAN	937,442	1.69
Trinidad Herrera	LABAN	933,384	1.68
Primitivo de Leon	LABAN	919,832	1.66
Alexander Boncayao	LABAN	912,463	1.65
Ernesto Rondon	LABAN	897,731	1.62
Emmanuel Santos	LABAN	896,788	1.62
Rafael Yabut	Consumers Party	36,088	0.07
Delfin Manlapaz	Emancipated Scientists Party	19,044	0.03
Damaso Flores	Independent	18,704	0.03
Jose Burgos Jr.	Youth Democratic Movement	15,408	0.03
Jose Ocampo Sr.	Emancipated Scientists Party	11,566	0.02
Beatriz Umali	Emancipated Scientists Party	9,522	0.02
Ernesto Tolentino	Youth Democratic Movement	8,840	0.02
Conrado Mendoza	Emancipated Scientists Party	8,726	0.02
Virgilio Ferrer	Youth Democratic Movement	8,275	0.01
Ireneo Angeles	Consumers Party	8,213	0.01
Humberto Moran	Emancipated Scientists Party	6,385	0.01
John Joseph Jr.	Emancipated Scientists Party	6,258	0.01
Johnny Regalado	Partido Sambayanang Pilipino	6,098	0.01
Marcelino Arias	Independent	5,841	0.01
Bernardita Arroyo	Emancipated Scientists Party	5,690	0.01
Isidro Real	Emancipated Scientists Party	5,073	0.01
Rosendo Yap	Independent	5,003	0.01
Salvador Valencia Sr.	Consumers Party	4,948	0.01
Ignacio Katapang	Emancipated Scientists Party	4,893	0.01
Emilio Guinto	Emancipated Scientists Party	4,821	0.01
Angel Gonzales	Independent	4,758	0.01
Narciso Castro	Youth Democratic Movement	4,551	0.01
Emilia dela Cruz	Emancipated Scientists Party	4,496	0.01
Rolando Olalia	Independent	4,286	0.01
Alfredo de Leon	Emancipated Scientists Party	4,273	0.01
Eusebio Cunanan	Emancipated Scientists Party	4,268	0.01
Bonier de Guzman	Independent	4,151	0.01
Conchita Ramos	Consumers Party	4,134	0.01
Felipe Navarro	Independent	3,916	0.01
Justa Dimayuga	Emancipated Scientists Party	3,825	0.01
Melannie Fernandez	Youth Democratic Movement	3,497	0.01
Virgilio Villaflor	Consumers Party	3,423	0.01
Emilia Peralta	Emancipated Scientists Party	3,265	0.01
Dina Atencio-Santos	Emancipated Scientists Party	3,226	0.01
Reynaldo Panopio	Consumers Party	3,211	0.01
Carlos Gopez	Emancipated Scientists Party	3,181	0.01
Juanito Lagao	Emancipated Scientists Party	3,033	0.01
Remedios Ong	Consumers Party	2,892	0.01
Lorerto Bertolano	Emancipated Scientists Party	2,806	0.01
Manuel Igrobay	Consumers Party	2,743	0.00
Ferrer Co	Independent	2,723	0.00
Melquiades Virata	Independent	2,715	0.00
Rodolfo Cajucom	Emancipated Scientists Party	2,641	0.00
Epifanio delos Santos	Lapiang Bagong Silang	2,615	0.00
Melchor Simbulan	Partido Sambayanang Pilipino	2,572	0.00
Isabelo Lim	Independent	2,550	0.00
Rodolfo Pagaduan	Emancipated Scientists Party	2,526	0.00
Roman Uy	Banyuhay	2,402	0.00
Jose Francisco	Independent	2,388	0.00
Leonida Supetran	Emancipated Scientists Party	2,355	0.00
Cirilo Bravo	Lapiang Bagong Silang	2,304	0.00
Oscar Ibay	Banyuhay	2,198	0.00
Paz Tengtio	Emancipated Scientists Party	2,037	0.00
Inocencio Dumlao	Independent	2,025	0.00
Catalino Luzano	Partido Sambayanang Pilipino	2,004	0.00
Conrado Reyes	Banyuhay	1,860	0.00
Francisco Pasion	Consumers Party	1,852	0.00
Andres Abarquez	Independent	1,806	0.00
Rodolfo Leyco	Partido Sambayanang Pilipino	1,780	0.00
Magno Sazon	Banyuhay	1,737	0.00
Alexander Lerona	Consumers Party	1,712	0.00
Jose Blanza	Lapiang Bagong Silang	1,688	0.00
Cipriano Cabrera	Independent	1,665	0.00
Phoebe Luz Salcedo	Lapiang Bagong Silang	1,630	0.00
Jose Villadolid	Partido Sambayanang Pilipino	1,608	0.00
Nellie Farinas	Independent	1,531	0.00
Ernesto Hidalgo	Independent	1,488	0.00
Arthur Amansec	Independent	1,480	0.00
Anthony Fortuna	Banyuhay	1,476	0.00
Pablo Soriano	Independent	1,431	0.00
Ruperto Galang	Independent	1,421	0.00
Conrado Galang	Independent	1,421	0.00
Gerardo Cornejo	Independent	1,362	0.00
Pedro Bolofer	Lapiang Bagong Silang	1,328	0.00
Luningning Mallari	Independent	1,302	0.00
Oscar Pascua	Independent	1,298	0.00
Reynaldo Reyes	Independent	1,184	0.00
Eusebio Ezpeleta	Independent	1,181	0.00
Jorge Mateo	Independent	1,174	0.00
Antonio Villar Jr.	Independent	1,147	0.00
Augusto Ibay	Independent	1,120	0.00
Danilo Galang	Independent	1,114	0.00
Reynaldo Navarez	Independent	1,106	0.00
Antipas Estipona	Independent	1,090	0.00
Benvenuto Juatco	Independent	1,080	0.00
Geronimo delos Reyes	Independent	1,052	0.00
Venancio Santiago	Lapiang Bagong Silang	1,048	0.00
Felino Guetan	Partido Sambayanang Pilipino	997	0.00
Joaquin Pablo	Independent	989	0.00
Ricardo de Jose	Independent	970	0.00
Elias Dulalia	Independent	948	0.00
Jose Manas	Independent	929	0.00
Frankie Grego	Independent	850	0.00
Jose Calilung	Lapiang Bagong Silang	844	0.00
Ephraim Salcedo	Independent	787	0.00
Pacifico Morelos	Independent	721	0.00
Alejandro Gador	Independent	689	0.00
Magdaleno Apachecha	Independent	680	0.00
Arturo Samaniego	Independent	679	0.00
Alipio Juntilla	Independent	588	0.00
Victorio Sosing	Independent	526	0.00
Virgilio Juliano	Independent	509	0.00
Demetrio Salem	Independent	505	0.00
Ignacio Serra Jr.	Independent	489	0.00
Nicolas Grio Jr.	Banyuhay	465	0.00
Simeon del Rosario	Independent	461	0.00
Federico Intal Lutero	Independent	360	0.00
Ricarte Ventosa	Independent	282	0.00
Ultoz Javierto	Independent	216	0.00
Total		55,415,893	100.00
Total votes		2,931,412	–
Registered voters/turnout		3,554,991	82.46
