= 1978 Philippine parliamentary election =

1st parliamentary elections in the Philippines

- April 7 and 27, 1978

179 (of the 189) seats in the Interim Batasang Pambansa 90 seats needed for a majority
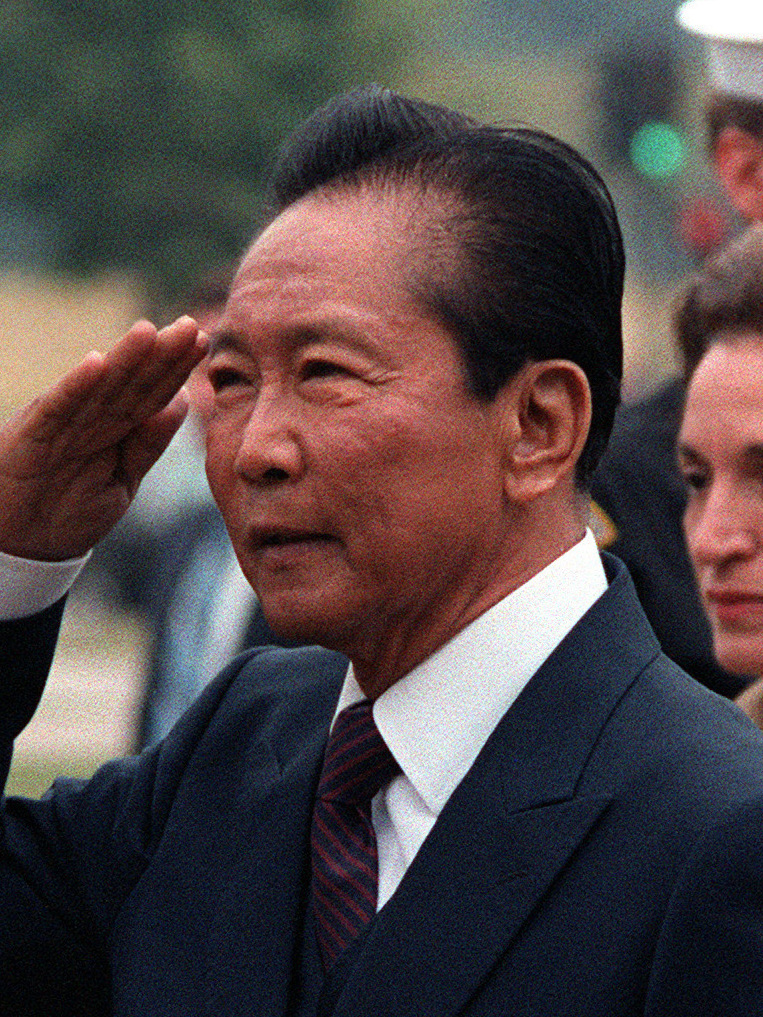

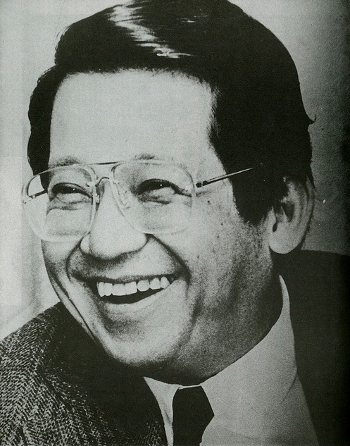

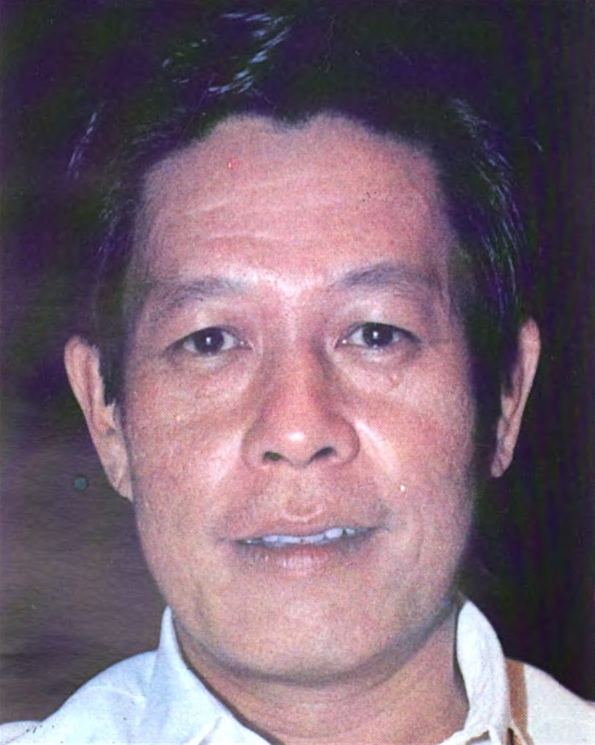
	First party	Second party	Third party
Leader	Ferdinand Marcos	Ninoy Aquino	Hilario Davide Jr.
Party	KBL	LABAN	Pusyon Bisaya
Leader's seat	none	Region IV-A (lost)	Region VII
Last election	new party	new party	new party
Seats won	150	0	13
Seat change	▲150	Steady	▲13
Popular vote	147,885,493	21,541,600	9,495,416
Percentage	71.13	10.36	4.57
- Results by region or constituency
Prime Minister-designate
Ferdinand Marcos
KBL

A parliamentary election was held in the Philippines on April 7, 1978, for the election of the 165 regional representatives to the Interim Batasang Pambansa (the nation's first parliament). The leading opposition party, the Lakas ng Bayan (LABAN), ran twenty-one candidates for the Metro Manila area. Their leading candidate was the jailed opposition leader Ninoy Aquino. Marcos regime's party known as the Kilusang Bagong Lipunan (KBL), which was led by the then-First Lady Imelda Marcos. Ninoy was allowed to run by his fellow partymates under the Liberal Party, who boycotted the election and was not allowed to campaign, and so his family campaigned for him. The night before the election on April 6, 1978, a noise barrage was organized by the supporters of LABAN which occurred up to dawn.

These elections were followed by the sectoral election on April 27, which elected additional 14 representatives. Another 10 representatives were appointed, bringing up the total number of representatives to 189.

== Background ==
The Philippines had been under martial law since 1972, with incumbent president Ferdinand Marcos ruling by decree. Prior to this, the Constitution of the Philippines was being drafted by the Constitutional Convention, whose delegates were elected in 1970. The Constitutional Convention approved the final draft of the constitution, which consisted of the abolition of the Philippine Congress and its replacement with an interim National Assembly consisting of the President, the Vice-President, the President of the Constitutional Convention, and members of the Senate and the House of Representatives in November 1972 and was later ratified on January 17, 1973, through so-called "citizens' assemblies". The Constitution was amended twice, on July 27–28, 1973 and February 27–28, 1975. The Constitution was amended once again on October 16–17, 1976 with the passage of "Amendment No. 6", which changed the name of the Interim National Assembly into the "Interim Batasang Pambansa", more commonly as the "Batasan".

== Electoral system ==
The Batasang Pambansa has not more than 200 members, of which there are 190 seats for this election, of which 166 are elected via multi-member districts via plurality block vote, similar to the Philippine Senate elections in the past. Each region corresponds to a parliamentary district, with the number of seats dependent on the region's population.

An additional 14 members are reserved for sectoral seats. There are three sectors: agricultural labor, industrial labor, and youth, each having one seat each from Visayas and Mindanao, 2 seats for Luzon, and the youth sector having an additional two seats elected at-large. The seats are determined by electoral college within each sector, with the electoral colleges voting via first-past-the-post system.

Finally, the president may choose members of the Cabinet to be members.

== Reappropriation ==
=== Parliamentary districts ===
Representation was via multi-member districts composed of regions, with the number of seats determined by population. The old congressional districts were redistricted into parliamentary districts of the region the provinces and cities are now included on.

The districts were determined by Presidential Decree No. 1296, otherwise known as the "1978 Election Code", specifically its Article II.

District	Seats	Old congressional districts
Region I	12	Benguet's at-large, Ilocos Norte's 1st and 2nd, Ilocos Sur's 1st and 2nd, La Union's 1st and 2nd, Mountain Province's at-large, Pangasinan's 1st, 2nd, 3rd, 4th, and 5th
Region II	7	Batanes's at-large, Cagayan's 1st and 2nd, Ifugao's at-large, Isabela's at-large, Kalinga-Apayao's at-large, Nueva Vizcaya's at-large, Quirino's at-large
Region III	16	Bataan's at-large, Bulacan's 1st and 2nd, Nueva Ecija's 1st and 2nd, Pampanga's 1st and 2nd, Tarlac's 1st and 2nd, Zambales's at-large
Region IV	19	Manila's 1st, 2nd, 3rd and 4th, Rizal's 1st, part of Rizal's 2nd
Region IV–A	20	Batangas's 1st, 2nd and 3rd, Cavite's at-large, Laguna's 1st and 2nd, Marinduque's at-large, Occidental Mindoro's at-large, Oriental Mindoro's at-large, Palawan's at-large, Quezon's 1st and 2nd, part of Rizal's 2nd, Romblon's at-large
Region V	12	Albay's 1st, 2nd and 3rd, Camarines Norte's at-large, Camarines Sur's 1st and 2nd, Catanduanes's at-large, Masbate's at-large. Sorsogon's 1st and 2nd
Region VI	16	Aklan's at-large, Antique's at-large, Capiz's 1st and 2nd, Iloilo's 1st, 2nd, 3rd, 4th and 5th, Negros Occidental's 1st, 2nd and 3rd
Region VII	13	Bohol's 1st, 2nd and 3rd, Cebu's 1st, 2nd, 3rd, 4th, 5th, 6th and 7th, Negros Oriental's 1st and 2nd
Region VIII	10	Eastern Samar's at-large, Leyte's 1st, 2nd, 3rd and 4th, Northern Samar's at-large, Samar's at-large, Southern Leyte's at-large
Region IX	8	Sulu's at-large, Zamboanga del Norte's at-large, Zamboanga del Sur's at-large
Region X	9	Agusan del Norte's at-large, Agusan del Sur's at-large, Bukidnon's at-large, Camiguin's at-large, MIsamis Occidental's at-large, MIsamis Oriental's at-large, Surigao del Norte's at-large
Region XI	10	Davao del Norte's at-large, Davao del Sur's at-large, Davao Oriental's at-large, South Cotabato's at-large, Surigao del Sur's at-large
Region XII	8	Cotabato's at-large, Lanao del Norte's at-large, Lanao del Sur's at-large
Total	160	

=== Sectoral representation ===
An innovation of the 1973 constitution is sectoral representation, of which three sectors are to be represented.

Sector	Seats	Divisions
Agricultural labor	4	Luzon (2 seats), Visayas, Mindanao
Industrial labor	4	Luzon (2 seats), Visayas, Mindanao
Youth	6	At-large (2 seats), Luzon (2 seats), Visayas, Mindanao
Total	14	

== Campaign ==
=== Lakas ng Bayan ===
In 1978, former Senators Gerry Roxas and Jovito Salonga opted for the opposition Liberal Party boycott the elections. Having initially agreed to the boycott due to "the government already [having] the forces in its command and the entire machinery of politics which [they] do not have", former Senator Benigno Aquino Jr. later changed his mind and opted to take part in the elections to have the chance to "talk to the people," having been imprisoned for almost six (6) years.

Aquino was then able to field twenty other candidates for the seats in Region IV (Metro Manila) under a big tent political party, dubbed Lakas ng Bayan ("People's Power"). The party's acronym was "LABAN" ("fight" in Tagalog).

On March 10, 1978, he was entitled to one television interview on GTV's Face the Nation (hosted by Ronnie Nathanielsz) in his prison at Fort Bonifacio, and proved to a startled and impressed populace that imprisonment had neither dulled his rapier-like tongue nor dampened his fighting spirit. According to Aquino, he wanted to give the people a vehicle to express their frustration or their anger "if there is any," while recognizing that should all twenty-one opposition candidates win, as they are a still minority in the Batasan, "the only job in this particular combat now is fiscalization... Mr. Marcos will profound the thesis of government, we will supply the antithesis so that in the clash of ideas, the people will have the synthesis."

On April 6, 1978, the eve of elections, supporters of the Lakas ng Bayan (LABAN) came out in protest by asking bystanders and cars to make noise in support the opposition.

=== Kilusang Bagong Lipunan ===
President Marcos established the Kilusang Bagong Lipunan (New Society Movement) on February 4, 1978 as his political vehicle for the elections. First Lady Imelda Marcos took a leave of absence from her position as governor of Metro Manila on February 17, 1978, the date she filed her certificate of candidacy for the Interim Batasang Pambansa; Ferdinand served as Metro Manila's acting governor in her stead.

During her campaign, Imelda inaugurated the first Bagong Lipunan health center of Metro Manila in Barangay Libis, Quezon City on March 21, 1978; the structure was completed in 20 days, and several other Bagong Lipunan health centers were built and opened across Metro Manila prior to month's end. Imelda gave assurances to Metro Manila voters that KBL candidates will positively transform the metropolis' depressed areas into respectable communities.

== Results ==
=== District elections ===
Party	Votes	%	Seats
KBL	147,885,493	71.13	137
LABAN	21,541,600	10.36	0
Pusyon Bisaya	9,495,416	4.57	13
Bagong Lipunan-Kilusan ng Nagkakaisang Nacionalista, Liberal	7,981,060	3.84	14
Mindanao Alliance	6,685,224	3.22	1
Bicol Saro	2,105,599	1.01	0
Young Philippines	1,471,381	0.71	0
Concerned Citizens' Aggrupation	1,374,549	0.66	0
Nacionalista	688,130	0.33	0
Emancipated Scientists	392,819	0.19	0
Partido ng Bagong Pilipino	140,365	0.07	0
Democratic Party	112,140	0.05	0
Philippine Labor Party	94,287	0.05	0
Confederation of Ilocano Associations	81,594	0.04	0
Consumers Party	69,216	0.03	0
Citizens Union Progress Party	44,893	0.02	0
Youth Democratic Movement	40,571	0.02	0
Sovereign Citizens Party	18,814	0.01	0
Partido Sambayanang Pilipino	15,050	0.01	0
Lapiang Bagong Silang	11,457	0.01	0
Bagong Anyo ng Buhay	11,190	0.01	0
Independent	7,633,851	3.67	1
Sectoral seats			14
Appointed seats			10
Total	207,894,699	100.00	190
Registered voters/turnout	21,464,213	85.52	
Source: Nohlen, Grotz, Hartmann, Graham and Santos and Teehankee

Vote share
KBL	71.13%
LABAN	10.36%
PB	4.57%
BLKNNL	3.84%
MA	3.22%
Others	6.88%

District seats
KBL	82.53%
LABAN	0.00%
PB	7.83%
BLKNNL	8.43%
MA	0.60%
Others	0.60%

=== Sectoral election ===
A separate election was held for the 14 members of the Batasang Pambansa's sectoral representatives.

This was via electoral college, with youth, industrial labor and agricultural labor as the three sectors. Each sector shall elect among themselves an electoral council, the members coming from provinces and cities. Each electoral council elected two members from Luzon, and a member each from Visayas and Mindanao, with two additional seats from the youth sector elected at-large, for a total of 14 seats.

== Aftermath ==
=== Allegations of fraud ===
Marcos said that fraud was committed by "both sides" during the elections, but not on a scale that would have affected the results. Jovito Salonga disagreed with the assessment and said that he did not observe people celebrating KBL’s victory because they felt "like they’ve been cheated."

During a protest rally against the election results on April 9 in Manila, several opposition leaders were arrested: Laban campaign manager Lorenzo Tañada, Laban candidates Teofisto Guingona Jr., Aquilino Pimentel Jr., Soc Rodrigo (arrested with his son Francisco Jr.), and Ernesto Rondon, Laban counsel Joker Arroyo, and Jesuit priest Romeo Intengan. President Marcos later ordered them released from police custody a month later.

=== April 6 Liberation Movement ===
An anti-Marcos anti-communist guerrilla group called the April 6 Liberation Movement, named after the date of the pre-election noise barrage, would later be formed in 1980. It was deemed a terrorist group for engaging in numerous bombings that year.

== See also ==
- Commission on Elections
- Politics of the Philippines
- Philippine elections
- Interim Batasang Pambansa
