= Sulu's at-large congressional district =

Legislative district of the Philippines

Sulu's at-large congressional district may refer to several instances when a provincewide at-large district was used for elections to Philippine national legislatures from the province of Sulu before 1987.

The single-member district was first created ahead of the 1935 Philippine legislative election following the 1934 constitutional convention where voters had been selected in electing a delegate for the province. Sulu had been admitted as a special province under the Department of Mindanao and Sulu since 1914 but was only previously represented through a multi-member delegation appointed by the Governor General covering all of Mindanao territory except Misamis and Surigao beginning in 1916. The district encompassed the entire territory of the Jolo and Tawi-Tawi island groups that was formerly known as the Sulu District and which was previously organized under Moro Province in 1903 from the same Spanish politico-military district (Distrito de Jolo) that existed since the Madrid Protocol of 1885. The Spanish district of Jolo was earlier represented in the Malolos Congress of the nascent First Philippine Republic by two delegates from Luzon.

Datu Ombra Amilbangsa of the Nacionalista Democrático was elected as the district's first representative in 1935 by a select group of electors composed of municipal and municipal district presidents, vice-presidents and councilors, among others. The first time a representative from the province was elected through popular vote was during the succeeding 1938 Philippine legislative election after the passage of Commonwealth Act No. 44 in 1936 which removed the restrictions on qualified voters in the former Bureau of Non-Christian Tribes-designated jurisdiction.

Sulu was also represented in the Second Republic National Assembly by two members during the Pacific War. It reverted to single-member representation for the restored Commonwealth and subsequent Third Republic House of Representatives. It continued to elect representatives until the dissolution of Congress in 1972. Following a shift to parliamentary system, districts were replaced by multi-member regional constituencies where Sulu, reduced to the Jolo island group following the separation of Tawi-Tawi in 1973, was represented as part of Region IX's at-large district. When provincial and city district representation was restored in 1984, Sulu was represented by one assemblyman, with a separate representation created for Tawi-Tawi. It was made obsolete by the 1987 reapportionment that established two districts in the province under a new constitution.

== Representation history ==
#	Term of office		National Assembly	Seat A				Seat B			
#	Start	End	National Assembly	Image	Member	Party	Electoral history	Image	Member	Party	Electoral history
=== Jolo's at-large district for the Malolos Congress ===
District created June 18, 1898.
–	September 15, 1898	March 23, 1901	1st		Benito Legarda	Independent	Appointed.		Victor Papa	Independent	Appointed.
#	Term of office		National Assembly	Single seat				Seats eliminated			
#	Start	End	National Assembly	Image	Member	Party	Electoral history	Seats eliminated			
=== Sulu's at-large district for the National Assembly (Commonwealth of the Philippines) ===								Seats eliminated			
District re-created February 8, 1935.								Seats eliminated			
1	September 16, 1935	December 30, 1938	1st		Ombra Amilbangsa	Nacionalista; Democrático	Elected in 1935.	Seats eliminated			
2	December 30, 1938	December 30, 1941	2nd		Gulamu Rasul	Nacionalista	Elected in 1938.	Seats eliminated			
#	Term of office		National Assembly	Seat A				Seat B			
#	Start	End	National Assembly	Image	Member	Party	Electoral history	Image	Member	Party	Electoral history
=== Sulu's at-large district for the National Assembly (Second Philippine Republic) ===
District re-created September 7, 1943.
–	September 25, 1943	February 2, 1944	1st		Gulamu Rasul	KALIBAPI	Elected in 1943.		Ombra Amilbangsa	KALIBAPI	Appointed as an ex officio member.
#	Term of office		Common wealth Congress	Single seat				Seats eliminated			
#	Start	End	Common wealth Congress	Image	Member	Party	Electoral history	Seats eliminated			
=== Sulu's at-large district for the House of Representatives of the Commonwealth of the Philippines ===								Seats eliminated			
District re-created May 24, 1945.								Seats eliminated			
(1)	June 9, 1945	May 25, 1946	1st		Ombra Amilbangsa	Nacionalista	Elected in 1941.	Seats eliminated			
#	Term of office		Congress	Single seat				Seats eliminated			
#	Start	End	Congress	Image	Member	Party	Electoral history	Seats eliminated			
=== Sulu's at-large district for the House of Representatives of the Philippines ===								Seats eliminated			
(1)	May 25, 1946	December 30, 1949	1st		Ombra Amilbangsa	Liberal	Re-elected in 1946.	Seats eliminated			
(2)	December 30, 1949	May 5, 1951	2nd		Gulamu Rasul	Nacionalista	Elected in 1949. Election annulled by House electoral tribunal after an electoral protest.	Seats eliminated			
(1)	May 5, 1951	December 30, 1961	2nd		Ombra Amilbangsa	Liberal	Declared winner of 1949 elections.	Seats eliminated			
(1)	May 5, 1951	December 30, 1961	3rd		Ombra Amilbangsa	Liberal	Re-elected in 1953.	Seats eliminated			
(1)	May 5, 1951	December 30, 1961	4th		Ombra Amilbangsa	Liberal	Re-elected in 1957.	Seats eliminated			
3	December 30, 1961	April 23, 1969	5th		Salih Ututalum	Nacionalista	Elected in 1961.	Seats eliminated			
3	December 30, 1961	April 23, 1969	6th		Salih Ututalum	Liberal	Re-elected in 1965. Election annulled by House electoral tribunal after an electoral protest.	Seats eliminated			
4	April 23, 1969	September 23, 1972	6th		Indanan M. Anni	Nacionalista	Declared winner of 1965 elections.	Seats eliminated			
4	April 23, 1969	September 23, 1972	7th		Indanan M. Anni	Nacionalista	Re-elected in 1969. Removed from office after imposition of martial law.	Seats eliminated			
District dissolved into the eight-seat Region IX's at-large district for the Interim Batasang Pambansa.								Seats eliminated			
#	Term of office		Batasang Pambansa	Single seat				Seats eliminated			
#	Start	End	Batasang Pambansa	Image	Member	Party	Electoral history	Seats eliminated			
=== Sulu's at-large district for the Regular Batasang Pambansa ===								Seats eliminated			
District re-created February 1, 1984.								Seats eliminated			
5	July 23, 1984	March 25, 1986	2nd		Hussin T. Loong	KBL	Elected in 1984.	Seats eliminated			
District dissolved into Sulu's 1st and 2nd districts.								Seats eliminated			

== See also ==
- Legislative districts of Sulu
- Legislative districts of Tawi-Tawi
