= Pusyon Bisaya =

Defunct Filipino political party

- Leader: Hilario Davide
- Founder: Hilario Davide
- Founded: 1978
- Dissolved: 1986
- Ideology: Localism; Pro-Visayan

The Pusyon Bisaya (lit. 'Visayan Coalition') was a Filipino political party which existed from 1978 to 1984. Its leader was Hilario Davide.

== 1978 elections ==
In 1978 elections, Pusyon won 13 seats led by Davide, who became the Batasang Pambansa Minority Floor Leader. The other 12 members won included: Natalio Bacalso, Bartolome Cabangbang, Eutiquio Cimafranca, Alfonso Corominas, Filemon Fernandez, Jorge Kintanar, Valentino Legaspi, Mariano Logarta, Enrique Medina, Dominador Pernes, Jesus Villegas and Julian Yballe.

== Electoral performance ==
Batasang Pambansa
Election	Leader	Votes		Seats			Position	Government
Election	Leader	No.	Share	No.	±	Share	Position	Government
1978	Hilario Davide	9,495,416	4.57%	13 / 189	(new)	10.4%	(new)	KBL
1984	Hilario Davide	161,944	0.27%	0 / 200	▼13	2.27%	▼13	KBL
