= Hilario Davide =

Hilario Davide may refer to:

- Hilario Davide Jr., former chief justice of the Philippines
- Hilario Davide III, former governor and vice governor of Cebu, Philippines
