= Region IX's at-large parliamentary district =

Former Philippine parliamentary district

- Former constituency for the Interim Batasang Pambansa

Former constituency
- Created: 1978
- Abolished: 1984
- Seats: 8

Region IX's at-large parliamentary district (also known as Western Mindanao's at-large parliamentary district) was a constituency for the Interim Batasang Pambansa, the legislature of the Philippines from 1978 to 1984. It encompassed the provinces of Basilan, Sulu, Tawi-Tawi, Zamboanga del Norte, Zamboanga del Sur and Zamboanga Sibugay, together with the cities of Dapitan, Dipolog, Pagadian, and Zamboanga.

The district had 8 seats in the assembly, all of which were held by members of the ruling party Kilusang Bagong Lipunan.

== List of assemblymen representing the district ==
=== Batasang Pambansa (1978–1986) ===
Portrait	Member (Province/City)	Term of office	Party	Legislature	Electoral history	Constituencies
District established February 7, 1978.
	Antonio Ceniza (Pagadian City)	June 12, 1978 – June 30, 1984	KBL	Interim Batasang Pambansa	Elected in 1978.	1978–1984; Provinces: Basilan, Sulu, Tawi-Tawi, Zamboanga del Norte, Zamboanga del Sur, Zamboanga Sibugay Cities: Dapitan, Dipolog, Pagadian, Zamboanga
	Joaquin Enriquez Jr. (Zamboanga City)	June 12, 1978 – June 30, 1984	KBL	Interim Batasang Pambansa	Elected in 1978.	1978–1984; Provinces: Basilan, Sulu, Tawi-Tawi, Zamboanga del Norte, Zamboanga del Sur, Zamboanga Sibugay Cities: Dapitan, Dipolog, Pagadian, Zamboanga
	Manuel Espaldon (Tawi-Tawi)	June 12, 1978 – June 30, 1984	KBL	Interim Batasang Pambansa	Elected in 1978.	1978–1984; Provinces: Basilan, Sulu, Tawi-Tawi, Zamboanga del Norte, Zamboanga del Sur, Zamboanga Sibugay Cities: Dapitan, Dipolog, Pagadian, Zamboanga
	Guardson Lood (Dipolog City)	June 12, 1978 – June 30, 1984	KBL	Interim Batasang Pambansa	Elected in 1978.	1978–1984; Provinces: Basilan, Sulu, Tawi-Tawi, Zamboanga del Norte, Zamboanga del Sur, Zamboanga Sibugay Cities: Dapitan, Dipolog, Pagadian, Zamboanga
	Hussin Loong (Sulu)	June 12, 1978 – June 30, 1984	KBL	Interim Batasang Pambansa	Elected in 1978.	1978–1984; Provinces: Basilan, Sulu, Tawi-Tawi, Zamboanga del Norte, Zamboanga del Sur, Zamboanga Sibugay Cities: Dapitan, Dipolog, Pagadian, Zamboanga
	Celso Palma (Tawi-Tawi)	June 12, 1978 – June 30, 1984	KBL	Interim Batasang Pambansa	Elected in 1978.	1978–1984; Provinces: Basilan, Sulu, Tawi-Tawi, Zamboanga del Norte, Zamboanga del Sur, Zamboanga Sibugay Cities: Dapitan, Dipolog, Pagadian, Zamboanga
	Ulpiano Ramas (Pagadian City)	June 12, 1978 – June 30, 1984	KBL	Interim Batasang Pambansa	Elected in 1978.	1978–1984; Provinces: Basilan, Sulu, Tawi-Tawi, Zamboanga del Norte, Zamboanga del Sur, Zamboanga Sibugay Cities: Dapitan, Dipolog, Pagadian, Zamboanga
	Kalbi Tupay (Basilan)	June 12, 1978 – June 30, 1984	KBL	Interim Batasang Pambansa	Elected in 1978.	1978–1984; Provinces: Basilan, Sulu, Tawi-Tawi, Zamboanga del Norte, Zamboanga del Sur, Zamboanga Sibugay Cities: Dapitan, Dipolog, Pagadian, Zamboanga
District dissolved into Basilan's at-large, Sulu's at-large, Tawi-Tawi's at-large, Zamboanga City's at-large, Zamboanga del Norte's at-large, Zamboanga del Sur's at-large and Zamboanga Sibugay's at-large.

== Election results ==
=== 1978 ===
Candidate	Party	Votes	%
Joaquin Enriquez Jr.	KBL	433,177	8.24
Antonio Ceniza	KBL	429,922	8.18
Manuel Espaldon	KBL	409,801	7.79
Celso Palma	KBL	394,055	7.50
Guardson Lood	KBL	388,072	7.38
Ulpiano Ramas	KBL	368,413	7.01
Hussin Loong	KBL	343,780	6.54
Kalbi Tupay	KBL	341,944	6.50
Cesar Climaco	CCA	297,467	5.66
Benjamin Arao	CCA	205,964	3.92
Ramon Lim	Mindanao Alliance	177,991	3.39
Jorge Santos	Mindanao Alliance	165,258	3.14
Felipe Azcuna	CCA	163,966	3.12
Indanan Anni	Mindanao Alliance	163,762	3.11
Jesus Balicanta	CCA	161,402	3.07
Paulo Briones	CCA	138,481	2.63
Mohammad Edris	CCA	138,465	2.63
Brigido Tijamo	CCA	136,592	2.60
Alawaddin Bandon Jr.	CCA	132,212	2.51
Asbi Edding	Independent	129,944	2.47
Artemio Mata	Independent	114,892	2.19
Mohammad Musa	Independent	9,785	0.19
Antolin Bongcawei	Independent	8,769	0.17
Matarul Sasapan	Independent	3,292	0.06
Total		5,257,406	100.00
Total votes		760,564	–
Registered voters/turnout		976,458	77.89
