= Region XI's at-large parliamentary district =

Former Philippine parliamentary district

- Former constituency for the Interim Batasang Pambansa

Former constituency
- Created: 1978
- Abolished: 1984
- Seats: 10

Region XI's at-large parliamentary district (also known as Southern Mindanao's at-large parliamentary district) was a constituency for the Interim Batasang Pambansa, the legislature of the Philippines from 1978 to 1984. It encompassed the provinces of Davao de Oro, Davao del Norte, Davao del Sur, Davao Occidental, Davao Oriental, Sarangani, South Cotabato, and Surigao del Sur, together with the cities of Davao and General Santos.

The district had 10 seats in the assembly, all of which were held by members of the ruling party Kilusang Bagong Lipunan.

== List of assemblymen representing the district ==
=== Batasang Pambansa (1978–1986) ===
Portrait	Member (Lifespan) (Province/City)	Term of office	Party	Legislature	Electoral history	Constituencies
District established February 7, 1978.
	Alejandro Almendras (1919–1995) (Davao City)	June 12, 1978 – June 30, 1984	KBL	Interim Batasang Pambansa	Elected in 1978.	1978–1984; Provinces: Davao de Oro, Davao del Norte, Davao del Sur, Davao Occidental, Davao Oriental, Sarangani, South Cotabato, Surigao del Sur Cities: Davao, General Santos
	Benjamin Bautista (1928–2006) (Davao del Sur)	June 12, 1978 – June 30, 1984	KBL	Interim Batasang Pambansa	Elected in 1978.	1978–1984; Provinces: Davao de Oro, Davao del Norte, Davao del Sur, Davao Occidental, Davao Oriental, Sarangani, South Cotabato, Surigao del Sur Cities: Davao, General Santos
	Rodolfo del Rosario (Davao City)	June 12, 1978 – June 30, 1984	KBL	Interim Batasang Pambansa	Elected in 1978.	1978–1984; Provinces: Davao de Oro, Davao del Norte, Davao del Sur, Davao Occidental, Davao Oriental, Sarangani, South Cotabato, Surigao del Sur Cities: Davao, General Santos
	Manuel Garcia (1932–2014) (Davao City)	June 12, 1978 – June 30, 1984	KBL	Interim Batasang Pambansa	Elected in 1978.	1978–1984; Provinces: Davao de Oro, Davao del Norte, Davao del Sur, Davao Occidental, Davao Oriental, Sarangani, South Cotabato, Surigao del Sur Cities: Davao, General Santos
	Teodoro Palma Gil (Davao Oriental)	June 12, 1978 – June 30, 1984	KBL	Interim Batasang Pambansa	Elected in 1978.	1978–1984; Provinces: Davao de Oro, Davao del Norte, Davao del Sur, Davao Occidental, Davao Oriental, Sarangani, South Cotabato, Surigao del Sur Cities: Davao, General Santos
	Jose Puyat Jr. (1935–2025) (Surigao del Sur)	June 12, 1978 – June 30, 1984	KBL	Interim Batasang Pambansa	Elected in 1978.	1978–1984; Provinces: Davao de Oro, Davao del Norte, Davao del Sur, Davao Occidental, Davao Oriental, Sarangani, South Cotabato, Surigao del Sur Cities: Davao, General Santos
	Jorge Royeca (General Santos City)	June 12, 1978 – June 30, 1984	KBL	Interim Batasang Pambansa	Elected in 1978.	1978–1984; Provinces: Davao de Oro, Davao del Norte, Davao del Sur, Davao Occidental, Davao Oriental, Sarangani, South Cotabato, Surigao del Sur Cities: Davao, General Santos
	Felicidad Santos (Davao City)	June 12, 1978 – June 30, 1984	KBL	Interim Batasang Pambansa	Elected in 1978.	1978–1984; Provinces: Davao de Oro, Davao del Norte, Davao del Sur, Davao Occidental, Davao Oriental, Sarangani, South Cotabato, Surigao del Sur Cities: Davao, General Santos
	Rogelio Sarmiento (Davao City)	June 12, 1978 – June 30, 1984	KBL	Interim Batasang Pambansa	Elected in 1978.	1978–1984; Provinces: Davao de Oro, Davao del Norte, Davao del Sur, Davao Occidental, Davao Oriental, Sarangani, South Cotabato, Surigao del Sur Cities: Davao, General Santos
	Jose T. Sison (1920–2005) (South Cotabato)	June 12, 1978 – June 30, 1984	KBL	Interim Batasang Pambansa	Elected in 1978.	1978–1984; Provinces: Davao de Oro, Davao del Norte, Davao del Sur, Davao Occidental, Davao Oriental, Sarangani, South Cotabato, Surigao del Sur Cities: Davao, General Santos
District dissolved Davao City's at-large, Davao del Norte's at-large, Davao del Sur's at-large, Davao Oriental's at-large, South Cotabato's at-large, and Surigao del Sur's at-large districts.

== Election results ==
=== 1978 ===
Candidate	Party	Votes	%
Jose Puyat	KBL	694,471	7.14
Alejandro Almendras	KBL	682,204	7.01
Rogelio Sarmiento	KBL	615,204	6.32
Felicidad Santos	KBL	612,308	6.29
Manuel Garcia	KBL	600,426	6.17
Rodolfo del Rosario	KBL	594,278	6.11
Jose Sison	KBL	574,019	5.90
Benjamin Bautista	KBL	571,115	5.87
Teodoro Palma Gil	KBL	551,287	5.67
Jorge Royeca	KBL	532,058	5.47
Cornelio Masakariño	Mindanao Alliance	469,317	4.82
Leonardo Tolentino	Mindanao Alliance	428,467	4.40
Dominador Carillo	Mindanao Alliance	343,797	3.53
Jesus Abear	Mindanao Alliance	322,940	3.32
Abbas Firdausi Ismail	Mindanao Alliance	307,896	3.16
Jesus Misa	Mindanao Alliance	301,080	3.09
Quirico Lim	Mindanao Alliance	299,737	3.08
Antonio Rafanan	Independent	275,688	2.83
Orlando Rimando	Mindanao Alliance	260,232	2.67
Leonardo Cocjin Jr.	Mindanao Alliance	232,520	2.39
Alfonso Escalona	Independent	98,568	1.01
Victor Clapano	Independent	70,531	0.72
Jesus Daffon	Independent	51,747	0.53
Angel Durano	Independent	32,869	0.34
Paterno Lomantas	Independent	32,315	0.33
Ruperto Garcia	Independent	31,282	0.32
Benjamin Cruzada	Independent	29,142	0.30
Antonio Acosta	Independent	28,025	0.29
Carlito Buntas	Independent	27,210	0.28
Abelardo Dajay	Independent	20,130	0.21
Gregorio Jover	Independent	15,321	0.16
Nerio Corvera	Independent	13,032	0.13
Mario Saga	Independent	9,360	0.10
Total		9,728,576	100.00
Total votes		1,117,027	–
Registered voters/turnout		1,354,922	82.44
