= Lakas ng Bayan =

Defunct Filipino political party (until 1983) and coalition (1987)

- Leader: Ninoy Aquino (1978–1983)
- Founder: Ninoy Aquino
- Founded: 1978 (as party); 1987 (as coalition)
- Split from: Liberal; Nacionalista
- Merged into: PDP–Laban
- Political position: Big tent
- National affiliation: United Nationalist Democratic Organization (1984)
- Coalition members: PDP–Laban (1987); Lakas ng Bansa (1987); Liberal (1987)

Lakas ng Bayan (English: People's Power), abbreviated as Laban, was an electoral alliance, later a political party, in the Philippines formed by Senator Ninoy Aquino for the 1978 Interim Batasang Pambansa regional elections. The party had 21 candidates for the Metro Manila area, all of whom lost, including Ninoy. The party's acronym (Laban) is a Filipino word meaning "fight".

After Aquino's exile to the United States, the party was managed by his brother-in-law, Peping Cojuangco.

By 1984, the party had formed a coalition with the Partido Demokratiko Pilipino of Nene Pimentel, himself a Laban party member. By 1986, the two parties were completely merged to form the Partido Demokratiko Pilipino–Lakas ng Bayan party or PDP–Laban.

The name "Lakas ng Bayan" would eventually be reused in the 1987 Philippine legislative elections as the name of a coalition led by the United Nationalist Democratic Organization party of President Corazon Aquino and Vice President Salvador Laurel.

== Organization ==
In a letter sent by Aquino to Senator Lorenzo Tañada dated March 16, 1982, Aquino emphasized that LABAN was a "mere umbrella organization formed to accommodate people affiliated with various parties." For Aquino, the advantage of having the LABAN umbrella was that its members could "belong to LP, NP, CSM, Citizens, PDP or whatever without losing their individual party affiliations."

== Noise barrage ==
On April 6, 1978, supporters of the party came out in protest by asking bystanders and cars to make noise in support of the opposition. However, on April 7, 1978, the first national election under martial law held for the 165-members to the Interim Batasang Pambansa resulted in the massive victory of the administration coalition party, the “Kilusang Bagong Lipunan ng Nagkakaisang Nacionalista, Liberal, at iba pa” or KBL. Only 15 opposition candidates in other parts of the country won. None of the members of LABAN were elected. The opposition denounced the massive vote buying and cheating in that elections. On June 12, 1978, the Interim Batasang Pambansa was convened with Marcos as President-Prime Minister and Querube Makalintal as Speaker.

Some opposition members went into exile or were driven underground fighting against the Marcos dictatorship. Labor leader Alex Boncayao became guerrilla and was killed by government security forces in 1983.

== Electoral performance ==
As LABAN was a coalition, the results below are combined totals of the parties under LABAN.

=== Parliamentary results ===
Batasang Pambansa
Election	Leader	Votes		Seats			Position	Government
Election	Leader	No.	Share	No.	±	Share	Position	Government
1978	Ninoy Aquino	21,541,600	10.4%	0 / 189	(new)	10.4%	(new)	KBL
1984 (Note: gained seats as part of opposition coalition with UNIDO)	Jose Laurel Jr.	1,344,607	2.27%	6 / 200	▲6	2.27%	▲6	KBL

=== Congressional results ===
House election	Votes	Vote share	House Seats won	Result	Senate election	Votes	Vote share	Senate Seats won	Ticket	Result
1987	11,661,047	58.1%	102 / 214	Lakas ng Bayan plurality	1987	243,431,395	64.9%	22 / 24	Lakas ng Bayan	Lakas ng Bayan win 22/24 seats

== Candidates ==
=== 1978 Interim Batasang Pambansa Region IV-A (Metro Manila) ===
Benigno "Ninoy" Aquino, Jr.
Fernando Tiongco "Gerardo/Jerry" Barican
Alex Boncayao
Felicismo "Feli" Cabigao
Atty. Juan T. David
Jaime "Jimmy" Ferrer
Neptali "Nep" A. Gonzales
Teofisto "Tito" T. Guingona, Jr.
Trinidad "Trining" Herrera
Priming de Leon
Chito Lucero
Ernesto "Ernie" M. Maceda
Dr. Antonio C. Martinez
Ramon "Monching" V. Mitra, Jr.
Aquilino "Nene" Q. Pimentel, Jr.
Charito Planas
Napoleon "Nap" Rama
Alejandro "Anding" R. Roces
Francisco "Soc" A. Rodrigo
Ernesto Rondon
Emmanuel "Noli" Santos

=== 1987 Senate (at-large) ===
Candidate	Party affiliation	Elected
Heherson Alvarez	Lakas ng Bansa	Yes
Edgardo Angara	Independent	Yes
Butz Aquino	BANDILA	Yes
Arthur Defensor	UNIDO	No
Neptali Gonzales	Lakas ng Bansa	Yes
Teofisto Guingona Jr.	Liberal	Yes
Ernesto Herrera	Liberal	Yes
Sotero Laurel	UNIDO	Yes
Joey Lina	Lakas ng Bansa	Yes
Ernesto Maceda	PDP–Laban	Yes
Raul Manglapus	NUCD	Yes
Orly Mercado	Liberal	Yes
John Henry Osmeña	Liberal	Yes
Vicente Paterno	PDP–Laban	Yes
Nene Pimentel	PDP–Laban	Yes
Santanina Rasul	Liberal	Yes
Alberto Romulo	Lakas ng Bansa	Yes
Rene Saguisag	Liberal	Yes
Augusto Sanchez	Independent	No
Jovito Salonga	Liberal	Yes
Leticia Ramos Shahani	Lakas ng Bansa	Yes
Mamintal Tamano	Nacionalista	Yes
Wigberto Tañada	Liberal	Yes
Victor Ziga	Liberal	Yes

Original LABAN	Elected?
Juan T. David	No

== See also ==
- PDP–Laban
- Laban ng Demokratikong Pilipino
- United Nationalist Democratic Organization
