= 1965 Philippine House of Representatives elections =

13th Philippine House of Representatives elections

- November 9, 1965

All 104 seats in the House of Representatives of the Philippines 53 seats needed for a majority
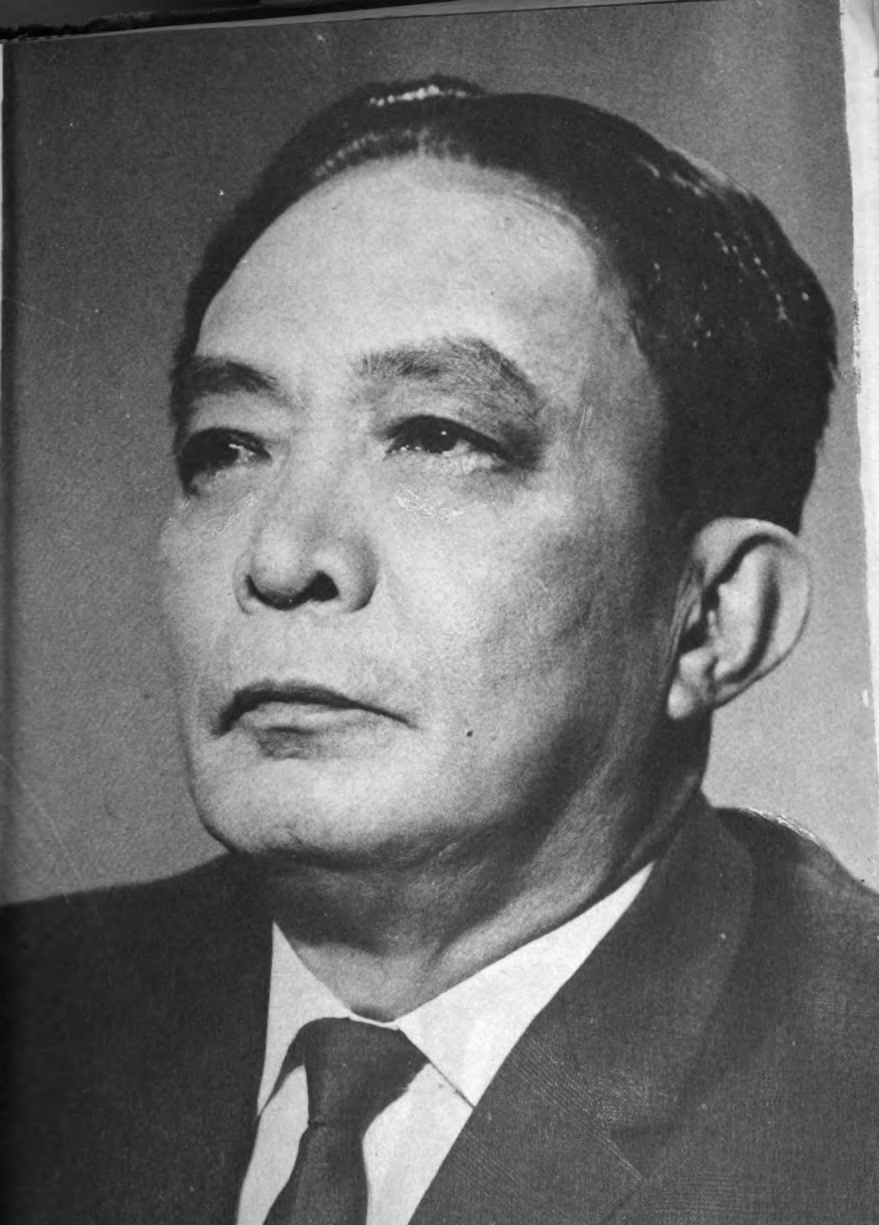

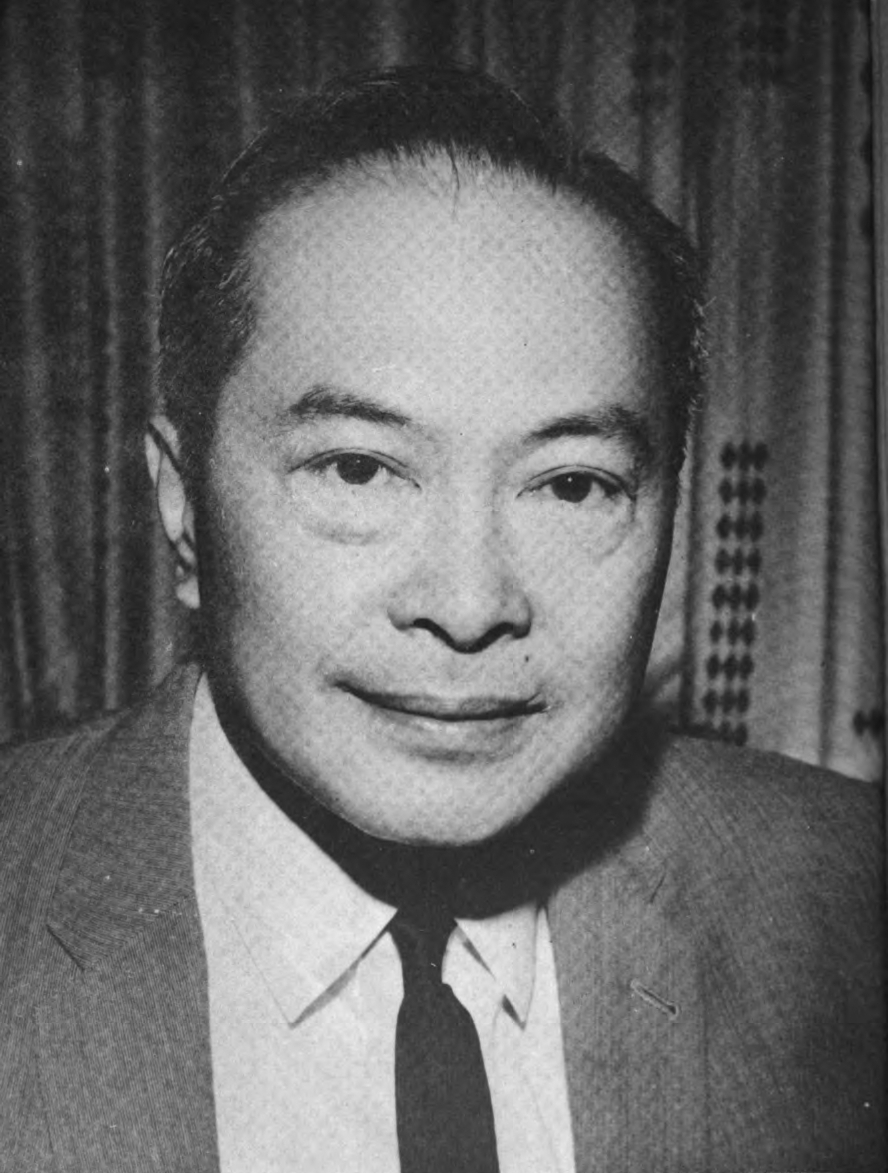
	Majority party	Minority party
Leader	Cornelio Villareal	Jose Laurel Jr.
Party	Liberal	Nacionalista
Leader's seat	Capiz–2nd	Batangas–3rd
Last election	29 seats, 33.71%	74 seats, 61.02%
Seats won	61	38
Seat change	▲32	▼36
Popular vote	3,721,460	3,028,224
Percentage	51.32	41.76
Swing	▲17.61	▼19.26
- Results: Nacionalista Liberal Independent
Speaker before election
Cornelio Villareal
Liberal
Elected Speaker
Cornelio Villareal
Liberal

Elections for the House of Representatives of the Philippines were held on November 9, 1965. Held on the same day as the presidential election, the party of the incumbent president, Diosdado Macapagal's Liberal Party, won a majority of the seats in the House of Representatives. Despite Ferdinand Marcos of the opposition Nacionalista Party winning the presidential election, Liberal Party congressmen did not defect to the Nacionalista Party. This led to Cornelio Villareal being retained Speaker of the House after retaking it from Daniel Romualdez midway during the previous Congress.

The elected representatives served in the 6th Congress from 1965 to 1969.

== Electoral system ==
The House of Representatives has at most 120 seats, 104 seats for this election, all voted via first-past-the-post in single-member districts. Each province is guaranteed at least one congressional district, with more populous provinces divided into two to seven districts.

Congress has the power of redistricting three years after each census.

== Redistricting ==
=== Changes from the 5th Congress ===
- Dividing Samar to Eastern Samar, Northern Samar, and Western Samar:
  - The municipalities included in Samar's 1st congressional district, except for Calbayog, were included in the at-large district of the newly created province of Northern Samar.
  - Calbayog (from the 1st district), along with the city of Catbalogan and the municipalities included in Samar's 2nd congressional district, were included in the at-large district of the newly created province of Western Samar.
  - The municipalities included in Samar's 3rd congressional district were included in the at-large district of the newly created province of Eastern Samar.
  - Enacted as Republic Act No. 4221
  - Took effect following the 1965 Samar division plebiscite

== Results ==
Party	Votes	%	+/–	Seats	+/–
Liberal Party	3,721,460	51.32	+17.61	61	+32
Nacionalista Party	3,028,224	41.76	−19.26	38	−36
Liberal Party (independent)	107,001	1.48	+0.74	1	New
Nacionalista Party (independent)	71,955	0.99	+0.36	1	New
Party for Philippine Progress	41,983	0.58	+0.58	0	0
Young Philippines	12,479	0.17	New	0	0
Republican Party	85	0.00	New	0	0
Independent	268,327	3.70	−0.08	3	+2
Total	7,251,514	100.00	–	104	0
Valid votes	7,251,514	95.29	−0.12		
Invalid/blank votes	358,537	4.71	+0.12		
Total votes	7,610,051	100.00	–		
Registered voters/turnout	9,962,345	76.39	−3.04		
Source: Nohlen, Grotz and Hartmann and Teehankee

Vote share
LP	51.32%
NP	41.76%
Others	6.92%

Seats
LP	58.65%
NP	36.54%
Others	4.81%

=== Results by district ===
Representative district	Candidate	Party	Votes	%
Abra's lone	Carmelo Barbero	Liberal	19,952	56.53
Abra's lone	Antonio Paredes	Nacionalista	13,054	36.98
Abra's lone	Agripino Brillantes	Nacionalista	2,290	6.49
Agusan's lone	Jose Aquino	Liberal	59,341	57.89
Agusan's lone	Guillermo Sanchez (incumbent)	Nacionalista	43,166	42.11
Agusan's lone	Juan Tiu	Liberal (Independent)	0	0.00
Aklan's lone	Rafael Legaspi	Nacionalista	33,972	51.42
Aklan's lone	Godofredo Ramos (incumbent)	Liberal	32,039	48.50
Aklan's lone	Exequiel Alejandro	Independent	50	0.08
Aklan's lone	Federico Rondario	Liberal (Independent)	1	0.00
Albay's 1st	Venancio Ziga (incumbent)	Liberal	15,394	39.10
Albay's 1st	Melchor Bañares	Nacionalista	10,680	27.13
Albay's 1st	Salvador Balane	Nacionalista	9,050	22.99
Albay's 1st	Elpidio Contante	Liberal	3,541	8.99
Albay's 1st	Antonio Saqueton	PPP	270	0.69
Albay's 1st	Mariano Barateta	Liberal	246	0.62
Albay's 1st	Felix Bonaobra	PPP	176	0.45
Albay's 1st	Ernesto Bernal	Nacionalista	10	0.03
Albay's 2nd	Carlos R. Imperial	Nacionalista	21,635	50.97
Albay's 2nd	Toribio Perez	Liberal	11,683	27.52
Albay's 2nd	Damaceno Ago	Liberal	7,334	17.28
Albay's 2nd	Hermel Nuyda	Independent	1,797	4.23
Albay's 3rd	Josefina Duran (incumbent)	Liberal	25,420	50.48
Albay's 3rd	Venicio Flores	Nacionalista	18,552	36.84
Albay's 3rd	Ramon Fernandez	Nacionalista	5,717	11.35
Albay's 3rd	Ciriaco Sayson	Independent	667	1.32
Antique's lone	Jose Fornier	Independent	21,294	37.36
Antique's lone	Enrique Zaldivar	Liberal	18,336	32.17
Antique's lone	Josue Cadiao	Nacionalista	17,368	30.47
Bataan's lone	Pablo Roman	Liberal	36,229	64.34
Bataan's lone	Jose Nuguid (incumbent)	Nacionalista	20,081	35.66
Batanes' lone	Aurora Abad	Liberal	2,629	66.90
Batanes' lone	Manuel Agudo	Nacionalista	1,301	33.10
Batangas' 1st	Federico Serrano	Nacionalista	34,273	50.74
Batangas' 1st	Luis Lopez (incumbent)	Liberal	32,755	48.49
Batangas' 1st	Isidro Ilao	Independent	353	0.52
Batangas' 1st	Vicente Arcega	Independent	163	0.24
Batangas' 2nd	Olegario Cantos	Liberal	38,153	44.24
Batangas' 2nd	Apolonio Marasigan (incumbent)	Nacionalista	36,345	42.14
Batangas' 2nd	Federico Aranas	Nacionalista	8,525	9.88
Batangas' 2nd	Numeriano Babao	Nacionalista (Independent)	2,901	3.36
Batangas' 2nd	Jesus Montalbo	Independent	319	0.37
Batangas' 3rd	Jose Laurel Jr. (incumbent)	Nacionalista	43,401	65.22
Batangas' 3rd	Enrique Custodio	Liberal	20,635	31.01
Batangas' 3rd	Jose Dimayuga	Independent	2,511	3.77
Bohol's 1st	Natalio Castillo (incumbent)	Nacionalista	19,242	41.77
Bohol's 1st	Gregorio Concon	Liberal	18,311	39.75
Bohol's 1st	Ramon Lapez	Nacionalista (Independent)	8,514	18.48
Bohol's 1st	Cesar Ceballos	Independent	1	0.00
Bohol's 1st	German Neri	Liberal	0	0.00
Bohol's 2nd	Jose Zafra	Nacionalista	27,587	51.10
Bohol's 2nd	Simeon Toribio	Liberal	26,399	48.90
Bohol's 2nd	Jesus Dumapias	Liberal (Independent)	5	0.01
Bohol's 3rd	Teodoro Galagar	Nacionalista	20,082	31.65
Bohol's 3rd	Maximino Garcia (incumbent)	Nacionalista	13,584	21.41
Bohol's 3rd	Lydia Soledad Dizon	Liberal	12,646	19.93
Bohol's 3rd	Cristeto Acharon	Liberal	7,145	11.26
Bohol's 3rd	Pantaleon Revilles	Liberal (Independent)	6,399	10.08
Bohol's 3rd	Juan Pajo	Nacionalista	3,396	5.35
Bohol's 3rd	Crispina Peñaflor	PPP	187	0.29
Bohol's 3rd	Catalino Madrazo	Liberal	20	0.03
Bukidnon's lone	Benjamin Tabios	Liberal	28,712	61.70
Bukidnon's lone	Cesar Fortich (incumbent)	Nacionalista	17,822	38.30
Bulacan's 1st	Teodulo Natividad (incumbent)	Nacionalista	57,165	57.95
Bulacan's 1st	Natividad Villarama	Liberal	41,485	42.05
Bulacan's 2nd	Rogaciano Mercado (incumbent)	Nacionalista	62,713	53.47
Bulacan's 2nd	Manolo Cruz	Liberal	52,456	44.73
Bulacan's 2nd	Raymundo Luna	PPP	2,113	1.80
Cagayan's 1st	Tito Dupaya (incumbent)	Liberal	34,735	57.20
Cagayan's 1st	Felipe Garduque	Nacionalista	25,575	42.12
Cagayan's 1st	Alberto Maguigad	Independent	233	0.38
Cagayan's 1st	Severo Lorenzo	PPP	179	0.29
Cagayan's 2nd	Benjamin Ligot (incumbent)	Liberal	27,153	53.28
Cagayan's 2nd	David Puzon	Nacionalista	23,808	46.72
Camarines Norte's lone	Fernando Pajarillo	Nacionalista	21,880	41.77
Camarines Norte's lone	Marcial Pimentel (incumbent)	Liberal	17,745	33.88
Camarines Norte's lone	Pedro Venida	Young Philippines	12,479	23.82
Camarines Norte's lone	Wilfredo Panotes Jr.	Independent	279	0.53
Camarines Sur's 1st	Ramon Felipe Jr.	Liberal	39,511	51.48
Camarines Sur's 1st	Juan Triviño (incumbent)	Nacionalista	30,696	39.99
Camarines Sur's 1st	Crisanto Alba	Nacionalista (Independent)	6,549	8.53
Camarines Sur's 2nd	Felix Fuentebella (incumbent)	Nacionalista	41,899	44.17
Camarines Sur's 2nd	Felix Alfelor Sr.	Liberal	41,817	44.09
Camarines Sur's 2nd	Juan Fajardo	Liberal	11,099	11.70
Camarines Sur's 2nd	Manuel Lopez	Independent	34	0.04
Camarines Sur's 2nd	Felix Pacamara	Independent	6	0.01
Capiz' 1st	Mariano Acuña	Liberal	31,990	49.26
Capiz' 1st	Carmen Consing	Nacionalista	31,300	48.20
Capiz' 1st	Atila Balgos	PPP	1,652	2.54
Capiz' 1st	Ricardo Castro	Nacionalista	1	0.00
Capiz' 2nd	Cornelio Villareal (incumbent)	Liberal	15,000	66.73
Capiz' 2nd	Pedro Exmundo	Nacionalista	7,480	33.27
Catanduanes' lone	Jose Alberto (incumbent)	Liberal	28,167	73.97
Catanduanes' lone	Francisco Perfecto	Independent	9,902	26.01
Catanduanes' lone	Jose Red	Independent	4	0.01
Catanduanes' lone	Dominador del Rosario	Nacionalista	4	0.01
Catanduanes' lone	Wenceslao Moral	PPP	0	0.00
Cavite's lone	Justiniano Montano (incumbent)	Liberal	95,490	76.68
Cavite's lone	Jose Topacio Cajulis	Nacionalista	29,046	23.32
Cebu's 1st	Ramon Durano (incumbent)	Nacionalista	37,584	60.60
Cebu's 1st	Mario Suson	Liberal	24,437	39.40
Cebu's 2nd	Jose Briones (incumbent)	Liberal	50,614	51.94
Cebu's 2nd	Francisco Remotigue	Nacionalista	46,830	48.06
Cebu's 3rd	Ernesto Bascon	Liberal	16,684	47.03
Cebu's 3rd	Maximino Noel (incumbent)	Nacionalista	16,360	46.11
Cebu's 3rd	Balmes Base	Liberal (Independent)	2,434	6.86
Cebu's 4th	Isidro Kintanar (incumbent)	Nacionalista	11,557	52.37
Cebu's 4th	Antonio Almirante Jr.	Independent	10,115	45.84
Cebu's 4th	Fructuoso Nepomuceno	Liberal	208	0.94
Cebu's 4th	Roque Lopez	PPP	187	0.85
Cebu's 4th	Deogracias Mendez	Liberal (Independent)	0	0.00
Cebu's 4th	Juvenal Osorio	Liberal	0	0.00
Cebu's 5th	Antonio Cuenco	Liberal	19,877	53.50
Cebu's 5th	Emerito Calderon	Independent	17,278	46.50
Cebu's 6th	Amado Arrieta	Liberal	17,122	43.98
Cebu's 6th	Manuel Zosa (incumbent)	Nacionalista	10,731	27.56
Cebu's 6th	Felix Barba	Liberal	7,087	18.20
Cebu's 6th	Mariano Logarta	Nacionalista	3,381	8.68
Cebu's 6th	Ernesto Rosales	Independent	614	1.58
Cebu's 7th	Tereso Dumon (incumbent)	Liberal	43,127	82.09
Cebu's 7th	Jesus Narvios	Nacionalista	7,743	14.74
Cebu's 7th	Rodrigo Ybañez	Independent	923	1.76
Cebu's 7th	Godofredo Roperos	PPP	743	1.41
Cotabato's lone	Salipada Pendatun (incumbent)	Liberal	162,089	70.17
Cotabato's lone	Melquiades Sucaldito	Nacionalista	68,894	29.83
Davao's lone	Lorenzo Sarmiento	Liberal	85,727	43.07
Davao's lone	Manuel Sotto	Nacionalista	70,355	35.35
Davao's lone	Luis Santos	Nacionalista	42,141	21.17
Davao's lone	Porfirio Ciencia	Liberal (Independent)	720	0.36
Davao's lone	Nestor Gonzales	Liberal	49	0.02
Davao's lone	Roque Briones	Independent	34	0.02
Ilocos Norte's 1st	Antonio Raquiza (incumbent)	Liberal (Independent)	34,092	74.37
Ilocos Norte's 1st	Ignacio Salvador	Nacionalista	7,606	16.59
Ilocos Norte's 1st	Jose Pascual	Liberal	4,143	9.04
Ilocos Norte's 2nd	Simeon Valdez (incumbent)	Nacionalista (Independent)	23,300	51.53
Ilocos Norte's 2nd	Gregorio Aquilizan	Nacionalista	11,629	25.72
Ilocos Norte's 2nd	Fe Acosta Aguinaldo	Liberal	9,869	21.82
Ilocos Norte's 2nd	Nicomedes Agag	Independent	421	0.93
Ilocos Sur's 1st	Floro Crisologo (incumbent)	Liberal	28,524	60.67
Ilocos Sur's 1st	Alfredo Somera	Nacionalista	11,601	24.68
Ilocos Sur's 1st	Amante Purisima	Nacionalista	6,890	14.65
Ilocos Sur's 2nd	—	—	—	—
Iloilo's 1st	Pedro Trono (incumbent)	Liberal	26,055	50.90
Iloilo's 1st	Jose Zulueta	Nacionalista	25,129	49.10
Iloilo's 2nd	Fermin Caram Jr.	Nacionalista	39,911	52.84
Iloilo's 2nd	Jovito Rivera	Liberal	35,093	46.46
Iloilo's 2nd	Calixto Dabalus	Independent	534	0.71
Iloilo's 3rd	Gloria Tabiana (incumbent)	Liberal	30,761	55.99
Iloilo's 3rd	Domitilo Abordo	Nacionalista	24,156	43.97
Iloilo's 3rd	Severino Simundo	Republican	20	0.04
Iloilo's 4th	Ricardo Ladrido (incumbent)	Liberal	26,752	53.82
Iloilo's 4th	Mariano Peñaflorida	Nacionalista	22,956	46.18
Iloilo's 5th	Jose Aldeguer (incumbent)	Nacionalista	29,396	57.81
Iloilo's 5th	Niel Tupas Sr.	Liberal	21,451	42.19
Isabela's lone	Melanio Singson	Liberal	50,145	50.32
Isabela's lone	Delfin Albano (incumbent)	Nacionalista	48,458	48.63
Isabela's lone	Arturo Cendaña	Nacionalista–Liberal	1,049	1.05
La Union's 1st	Magnolia Antonio	Independent	15,620	33.81
La Union's 1st	Joaquin Ortega	Nacionalista	11,190	24.22
La Union's 1st	Dionisio de Leon Jr.	Liberal–Nacionalista	10,442	22.60
La Union's 1st	Avelina Osias	Liberal	8,943	19.36
La Union's 2nd	Epifanio Castillejos	Nacionalista	21,131	49.75
La Union's 2nd	Manuel Cases (incumbent)	Liberal	20,601	48.50
La Union's 2nd	Gerardo Florendo	Independent	548	1.29
La Union's 2nd	Sotero Cacanindin	Nacionalista	196	0.46
Laguna's 1st	Manuel Concordia	Liberal	46,097	43.96
Laguna's 1st	Joaquin Chipeco (incumbent)	Nacionalista	36,469	34.78
Laguna's 1st	Jacobo Gonzales	Nacionalista	21,291	20.30
Laguna's 1st	Severino Edeza	PPP	1,008	0.96
Laguna's 1st	Francisco Rivera	Independent	1	0.00
Laguna's 2nd	Magdaleno Palacol Sr.	Liberal	18,944	30.80
Laguna's 2nd	Enrique Bautista	Nacionalista	12,851	20.90
Laguna's 2nd	Leonides de Leon	Nacionalista	12,039	19.57
Laguna's 2nd	Celso Fernandez	Independent	10,063	16.36
Laguna's 2nd	Domingo Baisas	PPP	5,421	8.81
Laguna's 2nd	Adelfo Maceda	Nacionalista (Independent)	2,184	3.55
Lanao del Norte's lone	Mohammad Ali Dimaporo	Liberal	46,122	64.46
Lanao del Norte's lone	Laurentino Badelles (incumbent)	Nacionalista	25,370	35.45
Lanao del Norte's lone	Petronio Guinea	Independent	64	0.09
Lanao del Sur's lone	Rashid Lucman (incumbent)	Liberal	106,155	79.86
Lanao del Sur's lone	Kiram Adiong	Nacionalista	26,734	20.11
Lanao del Sur's lone	Panginoma Didato	Nacionalista	26	0.02
Lanao del Sur's lone	Mangorsi Mindalano	PPP	18	0.01
Leyte's 1st	Artemio Mate	Nacionalista	31,750	47.76
Leyte's 1st	Norberto Romualdez III	Liberal	20,847	31.36
Leyte's 1st	Cirilo Roy Montejo	Liberal	13,886	20.89
Leyte's 2nd	Salud Vivero Parreño	Nacionalista	25,726	50.52
Leyte's 2nd	Primo Villasin (incumbent)	Liberal	25,152	49.39
Leyte's 2nd	Pastor Cariquez	Independent	28	0.05
Leyte's 2nd	Francisco Gatchalian	Independent	15	0.03
Leyte's 3rd	Marcelino Veloso (incumbent)	Nacionalista	30,125	53.82
Leyte's 3rd	Jose Aznar	Liberal	25,847	46.18
Leyte's 4th	Dominador Tan (incumbent)	Liberal	29,242	48.76
Leyte's 4th	Rodolfo Rivilla	Nacionalista	24,837	41.41
Leyte's 4th	Domingo Veloso	Liberal	5,895	9.83
Manila's 1st	Fidel Santiago (incumbent)	Liberal	22,727	24.69
Manila's 1st	Angel Castaño	Nacionalista	19,535	21.22
Manila's 1st	Rodrigo Gatmaitan	Nacionalista	15,487	16.82
Manila's 1st	Leopoldo Salcedo	Independent	13,115	14.25
Manila's 1st	Epifanio VIllegas	Independent	11,004	11.95
Manila's 1st	Manuel Alcobendas	Independent	5,342	5.80
Manila's 1st	Aurora Gatmaitan	Independent	2,747	2.98
Manila's 1st	Luz Nejal Bañez	PPP	1,175	1.28
Manila's 1st	Carlos Perfecto	Independent	924	1.00
Manila's 2nd	Joaquin Roces (incumbent)	Nacionalista	23,407	37.60
Manila's 2nd	Leonardo Fugoso	Liberal	18,446	29.63
Manila's 2nd	Roberto Oca	Nacionalista (Independent)	14,109	22.66
Manila's 2nd	Gloria Gener	Nacionalista	6,168	9.91
Manila's 2nd	Leonardo Falcon	Independent	123	0.20
Manila's 2nd	Arturo Samaniego	Liberal	7	0.01
Manila's 3rd	Sergio Loyola	Liberal	23,407	37.60
Manila's 3rd	Manuel Conde Urbano	Nacionalista	18,446	29.63
Manila's 3rd	Gerardo Espina Sr.	PPP	14,109	22.66
Manila's 3rd	Melecio Malabanan	Independent	6,168	9.91
Manila's 3rd	Cornelio Aguila	Independent	123	0.20
Manila's 3rd	Generoso Miranda Jr.	Independent	7	0.01
Manila's 4th	Pablo V. Ocampo	Nacionalista	34,016	38.56
Manila's 4th	Justo Albert (incumbent)	Liberal	29,166	33.07
Manila's 4th	Sotero Laurel	Nacionalista	21,977	24.92
Manila's 4th	Juan Baluyut	Liberal	1,894	2.15
Manila's 4th	Quirino Marquinez	Liberal	696	0.79
Manila's 4th	Nestor Gustilo	Independent	332	0.38
Manila's 4th	Jaime Zamora	Independent	125	0.14
Marinduque's lone	Francisco Lecaroz (incumbent)	Liberal	20,119	59.85
Marinduque's lone	Edmundo Reyes	Independent	12,245	36.43
Marinduque's lone	Florentino Pilar	Nacionalista	752	2.24
Marinduque's lone	Arturo Sevilla	Independent	477	1.42
Marinduque's lone	Manuel Madrigal	Nacionalista	22	0.07
Marinduque's lone	Casiano Aloyon	PPP	0	0.00
Masbate's lone	Andres Clemente Jr.	Nacionalista	35,334	50.41
Masbate's lone	Antonio Perez	Liberal	34,757	49.59
Misamis Occidental's lone	William Chiongbian	Liberal	39,807	54.86
Misamis Occidental's lone	Guillermo Sambo (incumbent)	Liberal	27,778	38.28
Misamis Occidental's lone	Marciano Cagatan	Nacionalista	4,928	6.79
Misamis Occidental's lone	William Velasco	Nacionalista	48	0.07
Misamis Oriental's lone	Emmanuel Pelaez	Independent	50,547	54.84
Misamis Oriental's lone	Vicente de Lara (incumbent)	Liberal	37,922	41.14
Misamis Oriental's lone	Fausto Dugenio	Nacionalista	3,704	4.02
Mountain Province's 1st	Juan Duyan	Liberal	13,996	42.45
Mountain Province's 1st	Florence Lamen	Liberal	12,061	36.58
Mountain Province's 1st	Tanding Odiem	Nacionalista	4,485	13.60
Mountain Province's 1st	Felix Diaz Jr.	Nacionalista	2,427	7.36
Mountain Province's 2nd	Andres Cosalan	Liberal	21,467	50.18
Mountain Province's 2nd	Luis Lardizabal	Nacionalista	20,014	46.78
Mountain Province's 2nd	Juventino Perfecto	Independent	1,290	3.02
Mountain Province's 2nd	Domingo Tolentino	Independent	9	0.02
Mountain Province's 3rd	Luis Hora (incumbent)	Liberal	5,185	31.95
Mountain Province's 3rd	Napoleon Hangdaan	Independent	3,887	23.95
Mountain Province's 3rd	Teofilo Pilando	Nacionalista (Independent)	3,629	22.36
Mountain Province's 3rd	Julia Ponchinlan	Independent	2,190	13.49
Mountain Province's 3rd	Joaquin Dugyon	Nacionalista	1,059	6.53
Mountain Province's 3rd	Joaquin Dunuan	PPP	277	1.71
Mountain Province's 3rd	David Gadit	PPP	2	0.01
Negros Occidental's 1st	Armando Gustilo (incumbent)	Nacionalista	1,059	6.53
Negros Occidental's 1st	Benito Montinola	Liberal	277	1.71
Negros Occidental's 1st	Felipe Navarro	Free Front	2	0.01
Negros Occidental's 2nd	Felix Amante	Liberal	34,010	38.37
Negros Occidental's 2nd	Inocencio Ferrer (incumbent)	Nacionalista	32,991	37.22
Negros Occidental's 2nd	Joaquin Villarosa	PPP	11,092	12.51
Negros Occidental's 2nd	Carlos Hilado	Liberal (Independent)	10,538	11.89
Negros Occidental's 3rd	Felix Feria Jr.	Liberal	41,794	49.32
Negros Occidental's 3rd	Agustin Gatuslao (incumbent)	Nacionalista	39,662	46.81
Negros Occidental's 3rd	Benjamin Barredo	PPP	2,522	2.98
Negros Occidental's 3rd	Artemio Balinas	Liberal (Independent)	754	0.89
Negros Oriental's 1st	Lorenzo Teves (incumbent)	Nacionalista	42,294	59.24
Negros Oriental's 1st	José E. Romero	Liberal	29,097	40.76
Negros Oriental's 2nd	Lamberto Macias	Nacionalista	23,164	50.56
Negros Oriental's 2nd	Herminio Teves	Liberal	22,652	49.44
Negros Oriental's 2nd	Paquito Arrieta	Liberal	0	0.00
Nueva Ecija's 1st	Eugenio Baltao (incumbent)	Liberal	39,117	47.31
Nueva Ecija's 1st	Leopoldo Diaz	Nacionalista	39,093	47.28
Nueva Ecija's 1st	Victor de los Reyes	PPP	4,457	5.39
Nueva Ecija's 1st	Jose Corpus	Independent	10	0.01
Nueva Ecija's 1st	Benito Jose	Liberal	4	0.00
Nueva Ecija's 2nd	Angel Concepcion	Nacionalista	53,869	51.45
Nueva Ecija's 2nd	Felicisimo Ocampo (incumbent)	Liberal	49,413	47.20
Nueva Ecija's 2nd	Jose Nilo Ramos	PPP	1,414	1.35
Nueva Vizcaya's lone	Leonardo B. Perez (incumbent)	Nacionalista	21,938	60.74
Nueva Vizcaya's lone	Jose Espino	Liberal	14,057	38.92
Nueva Vizcaya's lone	Lolita Alcantara	Independent	62	0.17
Nueva Vizcaya's lone	Alejo Parucha	Independent	60	0.17
Occidental Mindoro's lone	Pedro Medalla	Nacionalista	14,655	50.47
Occidental Mindoro's lone	Felipe Abeleda (incumbent)	Liberal	14,383	49.53
Oriental Mindoro's lone	Luciano Joson	Liberal	33,326	53.28
Oriental Mindoro's lone	Pio Remegio Baldos	Nacionalista	29,047	46.44
Oriental Mindoro's lone	Leodegario Magtibay	Independent	174	0.28
Palawan's lone	Ramon Mitra Jr.	Liberal	21,052	53.80
Palawan's lone	Gaudencio Abordo (incumbent)	Nacionalista	17,113	43.74
Palawan's lone	Sergio Flores	Liberal	960	2.45
Palawan's lone	Genaro Oceo	Nacionalista (Independent)	2	0.01
Pampanga's 1st	Juanita Nepomuceno	Liberal	51,673	57.01
Pampanga's 1st	Anastacio Bernal	Liberal	15,280	16.86
Pampanga's 1st	Carlos Sandico Jr.	Nacionalista	13,904	15.34
Pampanga's 1st	Juan Cancio	Independent	9,631	10.63
Pampanga's 1st	Gil Sanchez	Liberal	142	0.16
Pampanga's 1st	Jose Ocampo	Liberal (Independent)	9	0.01
Pampanga's 1st	Ricardo Quiambao	Free Party	5	0.01
Pampanga's 2nd	Angel Macapagal	Liberal	38,563	48.72
Pampanga's 2nd	Emilio Cortez (incumbent)	Nacionalista	17,701	22.36
Pampanga's 2nd	Leoncio Paruñgao Jr.	Independent	14,989	18.94
Pampanga's 2nd	Mario Bundalian	Independent	2,099	2.65
Pampanga's 2nd	Pedro Canlas	Nacionalista (Independent)	1,709	2.16
Pampanga's 2nd	Justo Barredo	Liberal	1,593	2.01
Pampanga's 2nd	Alfonsio Sagcal	Nacionalista	911	1.15
Pampanga's 2nd	Wilfredo Castor	Independent	760	0.96
Pampanga's 2nd	Meliton Soliman	Liberal	753	0.95
Pampanga's 2nd	Priscilo Mejia	PPP	75	0.09
Pangasinan's 1st	Aguedo Agbayani (incumbent)	Nacionalista	43,125	55.20
Pangasinan's 1st	Alex de Guzman	Liberal	34,233	43.82
Pangasinan's 1st	Calixto Acenas	Independent	485	0.62
Pangasinan's 1st	Juan Aquino	PPP	279	0.36
Pangasinan's 2nd	Jack Laureano Soriano	Nacionalista	43,125	55.20
Pangasinan's 2nd	Angel Fernandez (incumbent)	Liberal	34,233	43.82
Pangasinan's 2nd	Jose de Venecia Jr.	Liberal (Independent)	485	0.62
Pangasinan's 2nd	Benigno Pidlaoan	Independent	279	0.36
Pangasinan's 3rd	Cipriano Primicias Jr. (incumbent)	Nacionalista	39,122	52.98
Pangasinan's 3rd	Fabian Sison	Liberal	34,727	47.02
Pangasinan's 3rd	Oscar Garcia	Liberal	0	0.00
Pangasinan's 4th	Amadeo Perez (incumbent)	Liberal	31,575	49.47
Pangasinan's 4th	Estela Primicias Sindico	Nacionalista	30,459	47.72
Pangasinan's 4th	Ramon Saura	Nacionalista (Independent)	1,656	2.59
Pangasinan's 4th	Felipe Aurea	Independent	125	0.20
Pangasinan's 4th	Benito Valdez	Nacionalista (Independent)	8	0.01
Pangasinan's 5th	Jesus Reyes	Liberal	27,293	44.89
Pangasinan's 5th	Luciano Millan (incumbent)	Nacionalista	26,697	43.91
Pangasinan's 5th	Mercy de Vera	Independent	6,521	10.73
Pangasinan's 5th	Arcadio Lopez	Liberal	278	0.46
Pangasinan's 5th	Luis Garcia	Liberal (Independent)	11	0.02
Quezon's 1st	Manuel S. Enverga (incumbent)	Nacionalista	49,171	47.51
Quezon's 1st	Jaime Piopongco	Liberal	33,844	32.70
Quezon's 1st	Rafael de la Peña	Liberal	15,252	14.74
Quezon's 1st	Feliciano Abuei	Independent	5,219	5.04
Quezon's 1st	Isidro Umali	Independent	6	0.01
Quezon's 2nd	Eladio Caliwara (incumbent)	Liberal	47,370	56.06
Quezon's 2nd	Leon Guinto Jr.	Nacionalista	36,499	43.20
Quezon's 2nd	Manuel Caperiña	PPP	568	0.67
Quezon's 2nd	Boanerges Pumarada	Liberal	58	0.07
Rizal's 1st	Eddie Ilarde	Liberal	138,683	39.11
Rizal's 1st	Rufino Antonio (incumbent)	Liberal	116,811	32.94
Rizal's 1st	Damaso Flores	Nacionalista	91,517	25.81
Rizal's 1st	Amando Isip	Nacionalista (Independent)	7,394	2.09
Rizal's 1st	Eliseo de Guzman	Independent	187	0.05
Rizal's 2nd	Frisco San Juan Sr.	Nacionalista	75,299	58.14
Rizal's 2nd	Francisco Sumulong	Liberal	54,217	41.86
Romblon's lone	Jose Moreno (incumbent)	Nacionalista	19,989	52.43
Romblon's lone	Antonio Mayuga	Liberal	18,133	47.57
Samar's 1st	Eladio Balite (incumbent)	Liberal	47,218	61.11
Samar's 1st	Eusebio Moore	Nacionalista	30,052	38.89
Samar's 1st	Pablo Lacambra	Independent	1	0.00
Samar's 1st	Diosdado Sy	PPP	1	0.00
Samar's 2nd	Fernando Veloso (incumbent)	Nacionalista	21,080	37.51
Samar's 2nd	Jesus Japzon	Liberal	14,211	25.29
Samar's 2nd	Claro Yancha	Liberal (Independent)	7,316	13.02
Samar's 2nd	Marciano Lim	Liberal	7,114	12.66
Samar's 2nd	Valeriano Yancha	Independent	6,480	11.53
Samar's 3rd	Felipe Abrigo (incumbent)	Liberal	23,190	41.73
Samar's 3rd	Vicente Valley	Nacionalista	22,385	40.28
Samar's 3rd	Cesar Abogado	Liberal	6,205	11.17
Samar's 3rd	Juan Celeste	Liberal (Independent)	3,794	6.83
Samar's 3rd	Eugenio Obon	Nacionalista	0	0.00
Sorsogon's 1st	Salvador Encinas (incumbent)	Liberal	31,664	68.42
Sorsogon's 1st	Domingo Gabitan	Nacionalista	14,615	31.58
Sorsogon's 2nd	Vicente Peralta (incumbent)	Nacionalista	26,321	49.96
Sorsogon's 2nd	Jose Lachica	Liberal	26,268	49.86
Sorsogon's 2nd	Generoso Hubilla	PPP	92	0.17
Southern Leyte's lone	Nicanor Yñiguez (incumbent)	Nacionalista	31,238	55.24
Southern Leyte's lone	Aniceto Bantug	Liberal	24,835	43.92
Southern Leyte's lone	Pastor Robles	Independent	280	0.50
Southern Leyte's lone	Leoncio Ligad	PPP	196	0.35
Sulu's lone	Salih Ututalum (incumbent)	Liberal	26,509	34.59
Sulu's lone	Indanan Anni	Nacionalista	26,209	34.20
Sulu's lone	Alawi Abubakar	Liberal (Independent)	22,802	29.75
Sulu's lone	Ombra Amilbangsa	Liberal	1,111	1.45
Sulu's lone	Alberto Piñon	PPP	7	0.01
Surigao del Norte's lone	Constantino Navarro	Liberal	38,803	67.31
Surigao del Norte's lone	Rolando Geotina	Nacionalista	18,747	32.52
Surigao del Norte's lone	Wilde Almeda	Nacionalista	94	0.16
Surigao del Sur's lone	Gregorio Murillo	Nacionalista	24,595	51.12
Surigao del Sur's lone	Vicente Pimentel (incumbent)	Liberal	23,520	48.88
Tarlac's 1st	Peping Cojuangco (incumbent)	Liberal	35,914	52.01
Tarlac's 1st	Danding Cojuangco	Nacionalista	33,081	47.90
Tarlac's 1st	Crisostomo Valle	PPP	63	0.09
Tarlac's 1st	Celso Alviar	Liberal (Independent)	0	0.00
Tarlac's 2nd	Jose Yap	Liberal	37,420	62.74
Tarlac's 2nd	Bienvenido Buan	Nacionalista	13,561	22.74
Tarlac's 2nd	Amalio de Jesus Jr.	Independent	8,649	14.50
Tarlac's 2nd	Benjamin Rigor Domingdo	Nacionalista	9	0.02
Zambales' lone	Ramon Magsaysay Jr.	Liberal	39,663	57.68
Zambales' lone	Enrique Corpus	Nacionalista	28,900	42.03
Zambales' lone	Hortensio Evalle	Independent	181	0.26
Zambales' lone	Natalio Beltran	Independent	24	0.03
Zamboanga del Norte's lone	Alberto Ubay (incumbent)	Liberal	32,088	51.62
Zamboanga del Norte's lone	Felipe Azcuna	Nacionalista	30,062	48.36
Zamboanga del Norte's lone	Roberto Soliva	Independent	13	0.02
Zamboanga del Sur's lone	Vincenzo Sagun	Liberal	67,932	51.87
Zamboanga del Sur's lone	Bienvenido Ebarle	Nacionalista	63,046	48.13
Source: Commission on Elections

== See also ==
- Also held on this day:
  - 1965 Iloilo's 3rd congressional district special election: The result of the general election shall also serve as the result of the special election, and the winning candidate shall serve right away in the lame duck session of the 5th Congress
- 6th Congress of the Philippines

== Bibliography ==
- Paras, Corazon L. (2000). The Presidents of the Senate of the Republic of the Philippines. Giraffe Books. ISBN 971-8832-24-6.
- Pobre, Cesar P. (2000). Philippine Legislature 100 Years. Philippine Historical Association. ISBN 971-92245-0-9.
