= List of members of the House of Representatives of the Philippines (S) =

This is a complete list of past and present members of the House of Representatives of the Philippines whose last names begin with the letter S.

This list also includes members of the Philippine Assembly (1907–1916), the Commonwealth National Assembly (1935–1941), the Second Republic National Assembly (1943–1944) and the Batasang Pambansa (1978–1986).

== Sa ==
- Jose Sabarre, member for Samar's 2nd district (1912–1916)
- Claro Sabbun, member for Cagayan's 2nd district (1928–1931)
- Pedro Sabido, member for Albay's 3rd district (1922–1934, 1935–1941)
- Peter Sabido, member for Albay (1984–1986)
- Roberto Sabido, member for Albay's 3rd district (1969–1972)
- Jesus Sacdalan, member for Cotabato's 1st district (2010–2019)
- Joselito Sacdalan, member for Cotabato's 1st district (2019–2025)
- Chiquiting Sagarbarria, member for Negros Oriental's 2nd district (2016–2025)
- Maisa Sagarbarria, member for Negros Oriental's 2nd district (2025–present)
- Vicenzo Sagun, member for Zamboanga del Sur (1961–1969)
- Ruby Sahali, member for Tawi-Tawi (2013–2019)
- Nur-Ana Sahidulla, member for Sulu's 2nd district (2010–2016)
- Raden Sakaluran, member for Sultan Kudarat's 1st district (2010–2016)
- Rihan Sakaluran, member for Sultan Kudarat's 1st district (2019–2025)
- Ruth Sakaluran, member for Sultan Kudarat's 1st district (2025–present)
- Romeo Salalima, member for Albay's 3rd district (1995–1998)
- Abdulgani Salapuddin, member for Basilan (1998–2007)
- Perfecto Salas, member for Iloilo's 2nd district (1912–1916)
- Angel Salazar, member for Antique (1909–1916, 1922–1925)
- Pastor Salazar, member for Samar's 2nd district (1916–1922)
- Adrian Salceda, member for Albay's 3rd district (2025–present)
- Joey Salceda, member for Albay's 3rd district (1998–2007, 2016–2025)
- Victorino Salcedo, member for Iloilo's 5th district (1919–1922, 1935–1941)
- Dimszar Sali, member for Tawi-Tawi (2022–present)
- Benhur Salimbangon, member for Cebu's 4th district (2007–2010, 2010–2019)
- Janice Salimbangon, member for Cebu's 4th district (2019–present)
- Ron Salo, member for Kabayan party-list (2016–present)
- Orestes Salon, member for Agri party-list (2016–2019)
- Isaias Salonga, member for Rizal's 2nd district (1952–1953)
- Jovito R. Salonga, member for Rizal's 2nd district (1961–1965)
- Simeon Salonga, member for Bataan (1943–1944)
- Aniceto Saludo Jr., member for Southern Leyte (1998–2004)
- Andres Salvacion Jr., member for Leyte's 3rd district (2007–2016)
- Reynaldo Salvacion, member for Marinduque (2025–present)
- Kokoy Salvador, member for Nueva Ecija's 2nd district (2025–present)
- Serafin Salvador, member for Rizal's 2nd district (1953–1957)
- Edgardo Salvame, member for Palawan's 1st district (2022–2024)
- Rosalie Salvame, member for Palawan's 1st district (2025–present)
- Mark Aeron Sambar, member for PBA party-list (2010–2013, 2016–2019)
- Guillermo Sambo, member for Misamis Occidental (1961–1965)
- Damaso Samonte, member for Ilocos Norte's 1st district (1946–1949)
- Felix Samson, member for Albay's 3rd district (1909–1912)
- Primitivo San Agustin, member for Tayabas's 1st district (1925–1928)
- Leopoldo San Buenaventura, member for Camarines Sur's 2nd district (1995–1998)
- Eli San Fernando, member for Kamanggagawa party-list (2025–present)
- Filomena San Juan, member for Zamboanga del Sur's 2nd district (2001–2004)
- Frisco San Juan, member for Rizal's 2nd district (1965–1972), and Region IV-A (1978–1984)
- Edgar San Luis, member for Laguna's 4th district (2007–2013)
- Rodolfo San Luis, member for Laguna's 4th district (1998–2004)
- Jose San Victores, member for Mindanao and Sulu (1931–1934)
- Augusto Sanchez, member for Pasig–Marikina (1984–1986)
- Evaristo Sanchez, member for Pangasinan's 5th district (1925–1928)
- Guillermo Sanchez, member for Agusan (1953–1965), and Agusan del Norte (1969–1972)
- Hector Sanchez, member for Catanduanes (2019–2022)
- Manuel Sanchez, member for Rizal's 1st district (1992–1993)
- Alvin Sandoval, member for Malabon–Navotas (2007–2009)
- Claudio Sandoval, member for Palawan (1931–1941)
- Manuel Sandoval, member for Palawan (1909–1919)
- Ricky Sandoval, member for Malabon–Navotas (1998–2007), and Malabon (2016–2019)
- Vicente Sandoval, member for Palawan's 1st district (1995–2004)
- Amuhilda Sangcopan, member for Anak Mindanao party-list (2018–2022)
- Pablo Sanidad, member for Ilocos Sur's 2nd district (1961–1965)
- Prospero Sanidad, member for Ilocos Sur's 2nd district (1934–1935, 1938–1941, 1945–1946)
- Hugo Sansano, member for Pangasinan's 5th district (1912–1916)
- Fidel Santiago, member for Manila's 1st district (1961–1969)
- Joseph Santiago, member for Catanduanes (2001–2010)
- Luis Santiago, member for Rizal's 2nd district (1928–1931)
- Narciso Santiago III, member for ARC party-list (2007–2010)
- Erlinda Santiago, member for 1 SAGIP party-list (2013–2016)
- Alejo Santos, member for Bulacan's 2nd district (1946–1953)
- Ambrosio Santos, member for Bulacan's 1st district (1914–1916)
- Arcadio Santos, member for Rizal's 1st district (1916–1919)
- Cirilo Santos, member for Bulacan's 2nd district (1919–1922, 1928–1931)
- Eugenio Santos, member for Rizal's 2nd district (1916–1919)
- Felicidad Santos, member for Region XI (1978–1984)
- Luis Santos, member for Davao City's 3rd district (1987–1992)
- Maria Alana Samantha Santos, member for Cotabato's 3rd district (2022–present)
- Mark Anthony Santos, member for Las Piñas (2025–present)
- Oscar Santos, member for Quezon (1984–1986), and Quezon's 4th district (1987–1992)
- Romeo Santos, member for Caloocan's 1st district (1987–1992)
- Vilma Santos, member for Batangas's 6th district (2016–2022)
- Jose Sanvictores, member for Mindanao and Sulu (1928–1934)
- Patricia Sarenas, member for Abanse Pinay party-list (1998–2001)
- Juan Sarenas, member for Davao (1943–1944, 1945–1946)
- Cornelio Sarigumba, member for Bohol's 2nd district (1928–1931)
- Angelito Sarmiento, member for Bulacan's 4th district (1992–2001)
- Cesar Sarmiento, member for Catanduanes (2010–2019)
- Edgar Mary Sarmiento, member for Samar's 1st district (2016–2022)
- Lorenzo Sarmiento, member for Davao (1966–1967), Davao del Norte (1967–1972), and Davao del Norte's 1st district (1987–1992)
- Mel Senen Sarmiento, member for Samar's 1st district (2010–2015)
- Rogelio Sarmiento, member for Region XI (1978–1984), Davao del Norte (1984–1986), Davao del Norte's 1st district (1992–1998), and Compostela Valley's 1st district (1998–2001)
- Ulpinao Sarmiento III, member for A Teacher party-list (2009–2010)
- Efren Sarte, member for Albay's 3rd district (1987–1988)
- Josephine Sato, member for Occidental Mindoro (2001–2004, 2013–2022)
- Primitivo Sato, member for Cebu's 3rd district (1949–1953)
- Baltazar Sator, member for Davao del Norte's 2nd district (1987–1998)
- Irene Gay Saulog, member for Kalinga party-list (2019–present)
- Deogracias Victor Savellano, member for Ilocos Sur's 1st district (2016–2022)
- Homobono Sawit, member for Tarlac (1984–1986)

== Sc ==
- Julius Schuck, member for Mindanao and Sulu (1920–1922)

== Se ==
- Fausto Seachon Jr., member for Masbate's 3rd district (1995–2004)
- Rizalina Seachon-Lanete, member for Masbate's 3rd district (2004–2010)
- Cecilia Seares-Luna, member for Abra (2007–2010)
- Proceso Sebastián, member for Cagayan's 2nd district (1922–1925)
- Bai Sandra Sema, member for Maguindanao's 1st district (2010–2019)
- Hans Christian Señeres, member for Buhay party-list (2004–2007)
- Roy Señeres, member for OFW Family Club party-list (2013–2016)
- Januario Seno, sectoral member (1978–1984)
- Gavino Sepulveda, member for Davao (1957–1961)
- Antonio Serapio, member for Valenzuela (1987–1998), and Valenzuela's 2nd district (2004–2007)
- Jose Serapio, member for Bulacan (1925–1928)
- Federico Serrano, member for Batangas's 1st district (1965–1969)
- Felixberto Serrano, member for Batangas's 1st district (1946–1949)
- Jesus Serrano, member for Ilocos Sur's 1st district (1945–1946)
- Lope Severino, member for Negros Occidental's 1st district (1916–1922)
- Melecio Severino, member for Negros Occidental's 1st district (1912–1916)
- Fortunato Sevilla, member for Leyte's 4th district (1934–1935)
- Francisco Sevilla, member for Rizal's 1st district (1938–1941, 1945–1946)

== Sh ==
- Ranjit Shahani, member for Pangasinan's 6th district (1995–1998)
- Sun Shimura, member for Cebu's 4th district (2025–present)

== Si ==
- Frederick Siao, member for Iligan (2016–2022)
- Isidoro Siapno, member for Pangasinan's 2nd district (1925–1928)
- Julio Siayangco, member for Leyte's 3rd district (1919–1922)
- Domingo Siazon, member for Cagayan's 1st district (1949–1953)
- Joseph Sibug, sectoral member (1992–1995)
- Gerardo Sicat, Cabinet member (1978–1984)
- Lamberto Siguion-Reyna, member for Pangasinan's 2nd district (1922–1925)
- Rene Silos, member for APEC party-list (1998–2001)
- Lorna Silverio, member for Bulacan's 3rd district (2001–2010, 2016–2025)
- Ricardo Silverio, member for Bulacan's 3rd district (1992–2001)
- Tito Silverio, member for Negros Occidental's 3rd district (1919–1922)
- Fernando Silvosa, member for Surigao (1943–1944)
- Alejandro Simpauco, member for Tarlac's 2nd district (1946–1949)
- Kristine Singson-Meehan, member for Ilocos Sur's 2nd district (2019–present)
- Richelle Singson-Michael, member for Ako Ilocano Ako party-list (2022–present)
- Chavit Singson, member for Ilocos Sur's 1st district (1987–1992)
- Conrado Singson, member for Cagayan's 1st district (1938–1941, 1946–1949)
- Eric Singson, member for Ilocos Sur (1984–1986), and Ilocos Sur's 2nd district (1987–1998, 2001–2010, 2013–2019)
- Eric Singson Jr., member for Ilocos Sur's 2nd district (2010–2013)
- Grace Singson, member for Ilocos Sur's 2nd district (1998–2001)
- Jose Singson Jr., member for Probinsyano Ako party-list (2019–2022)
- Melanio Singson, member for Isabela (1965–1969)
- Ronald Singson, member for Ilocos Sur's 1st district (2007–2011, 2013–2016, 2022–present)
- Ryan Luis Singson, member for Ilocos Sur's 1st district (2011–2013)
- Vicente Singson Encarnacion, member for Ilocos Sur's 1st district (1907–1913)
- Pedro Singson Reyes, member for Ilocos Sur's 1st district (1931–1935)
- Luciano Sinko, member for Samar's 2nd district (1907–1909)
- Datu Sinsuat, member for Mindanao and Sulu (1931–1934)
- Datu Blah Sinsuat, member for Cotabato (1949–1953), and Region XII (1978–1984)
- Datu Roonie Sinsuat Sr., member for Maguindanao's 1st district (2019–2022)
- Dolores Sison, member for Region V (1978–1984)
- Eusebio Sison, member for Pangasinan's 4th district (1922–1934)
- Fabian Sison, member for Pangasinan (1984–1986), and Pangasinan's 3rd district (1987–1992)
- Jose Sison, member for Region XI (1978–1984)
- Modesto Sison, member for Pangasinan's 1st district (1916–1919)
- Pedro María Sison, member for Pangasinan's 4th district (1912–1916)
- Adelino Sitoy, member for Cebu (1984–1986)

== So ==
- Victorino Dennis Socrates, member for Palawan's 2nd district (2010–2013)
- Jose Solis, member for Sorsogon's 2nd district (2001–2010)
- Vicente Solis, member for Pangasinan's 1st district (1912–1916)
- Benito Soliven, member for Ilocos Sur's 1st district (1928–1931, 1935–1941)
- Januario Soller Jr., member for Region IV (1978–1984)
- Steve Solon, member for Sarangani (2022–present)
- Nerissa Corazon Soon-Ruiz, member for Cebu's 6th district (1992–1998, 2001–2010)
- Antero Soriano, member for Cavite (1925–1928)
- Francisco Soriano, member for Surigao (1907–1909)
- Jack Soriano, member for Pangasinan's 2nd district (1965–1969)
- Jeffrey Soriano, member for ACT-CIS party-list (2022–2023, 2026–present)
- Sulpicio Soriano, member for Pangasinan's 1st district (1949–1953)
- Cesar Sotto, member for Davao (1938–1941)
- Filemon Sotto, member for Cebu's 3rd district (1907–1916)
- Vicente Sotto, member for Cebu's 2nd district (1922–1925)

== St ==
- Hortensia Starke, member for Negros Occidental's 6th district (1987–1995)

== Su ==
- Lordan Suan, member for Cagayan de Oro's 1st district (2022–present)
- Bella Suansing, member for Sultan Kudarat's 2nd district (2025–present)
- Estrellita Suansing, member for Nueva Ecija's 1st district (2016–2022)
- Horacio Suansing Jr., member for Sultan Kudarat's 2nd district (2016–2025)
- Mika Suansing, member for Nueva Ecija's 1st district (2022–present)
- Aleta Suarez, member for Quezon's 3rd district (2001–2004, 2013–2016, 2019–2022)
- Danilo Suarez, member for Quezon's 3rd district (1992–2001, 2004–2013, 2016–2019)
- David Suarez, member for Quezon's 2nd district (2019–present)
- Fortunato Suarez, member for Quezon's 1st district (1946–1949)
- Arsenio Suazo, member for Mindanao and Sulu (1925–1928)
- Francisco Sumulong, member for Rizal's 2nd district (1961–1965), Rizal (1984–1986), and Rizal's 1st district (1987–1992)
- Lorenzo Sumulong, member for Rizal's 2nd district (1946–1949)
- Victor Sumulong, member for Antipolo (1998–2004), and Antipolo's 2nd district (2004–2007)
- Teodulfo Suñer, member for Capiz's 3rd district (1928–1931)
- Angel Suntay, member for Bulacan's 1st district (1928–1931)
- Bong Suntay, member for Quezon City's 4th district (2019–2022, 2025–present)
- Jose Suntay Jr., member for Bulacan's 1st district (1957–1961)
- Rolex Suplico, member for Iloilo's 5th district (1998–2007)
- Mary Ann Susano, member for Quezon City's 2nd district (2004–2010)
- Jose Surtida, member for Albay's 4th district (1934–1935)

== Sy ==
- Jose Antonio Sy-Alvarado, member for Bulacan's 1st district (2016–2022)
- Maria Victoria Sy-Alvarado, member for Bulacan's 1st district (2007–2016)
- Wilhelmino Sy-Alvarado, member for Bulacan's 1st district (1998–2007)
- Jocelyn Sy-Limkaichong, member for Negros Oriental's 1st district (2007–2013, 2016–present)
- Celestino Sybico Jr., member for Cebu's 7th district (1969–1972)
- Augusto Syjuco Jr., member for Iloilo's 2nd district (1998–2004, 2010–2013)
- Judy Syjuco, member for Iloilo's 2nd district (2004–2010)
