= List of members of the House of Representatives of the Philippines (U) =

This is a complete list of past and present members of the House of Representatives of the Philippines whose last names begin with the letter U.

This list also includes members of the Philippine Assembly (1907–1916), the Commonwealth National Assembly (1935–1941), the Second Republic National Assembly (1943–1944) and the Batasang Pambansa (1978–1986).

== Ub ==
- Alberto Ubay, member for Zamboanga del Norte (1953–1969)

== Um ==
- Alfonso Umali Jr., member for Oriental Mindoro's 2nd district (2001–2010, 2019–present)
- Aurelio Umali, member for Nueva Ecija's 3rd district (2001–2007)
- Czarina Umali, member for Nueva Ecija's 3rd district (2007–2016)
- Maria Victoria Umali, member for A Teacher party-list (2019–2022)
- Narciso Umali, member for Quezon's 1st district (1949–1953)
- Reynaldo Umali, member for Oriental Mindoro's 2nd district (2010–2019)

== Un ==
- Christian Unabia, member for Misamis Oriental's 1st district (2019–present)
- Peter Unabia, member for Misamis Oriental's 1st district (2010–2019)
- Telesforo Unas, member for Cavite's 3rd district (1992–1998)
- Gorgonio Unde, member for SCFO party-list (1998–2001)
- Alberto Ungab, member for Davao City's 3rd district (2016–2019)
- Isidro Ungab, member for Davao City's 3rd district (2007–2016, 2019–present)
- Renato Unico Sr., member for Camarines Norte (1987–1992)
- Renato Unico Jr., member for Camarines Norte (2001–2007), and Camarines Norte's 1st district (2010–2013, 2016–2019)
- Mariano Untivero, member for Laguna's 2nd district (1934–1935)

== Ur ==
- Vicente Urgello, member for Cebu's 3rd district (1916–1922)
- Jose Urquico, member for Tarlac's 2nd district (1938–1941)
- Jose Urquiola, member for Capiz's 2nd district (1919–1922)
- Alejandro Urro, member for Zamboanga del Sur's 1st district (1992–2001)
- Agaton Ursua, member for Camarines Sur's 1st district (1957–1961)

== Ut ==
- Salih Ututalum, member for Sulu (1961–1969)

== Uy ==
- Edwin Uy, member for Isabela's 2nd district (2001–2010)
- Jose Uy, member for Marinduque (1931–1941)
- Juliette Uy, member for Misamis Oriental's 2nd district (2013–2022)
- Oyo Uy, member for Davao del Norte's 1st district (2025–present)
- Pinpin Uy, member for Zamboanga del Norte's 1st district (2023–present)
- Reynaldo Uy, member for Samar's 1st district (2001–2010)
- Rolando Uy, member for Cagayan de Oro's 1st district (2007–2010, 2013–2022)
- Carlos Roman Uybarreta, member for 1-CARE party-list (2016–2019)
