= Mountain Province's 3rd congressional district =

Legislative district of the Philippines

- Former constituency for the House of Representatives of the Philippines
- Province: Mountain Province

Former constituency
- Created: 1935 (first creation); 1945 (second creation)
- Abolished: 1943 (first abolition); 1969 (second abolition)

Mountain Province's 3rd congressional district was one of the three congressional districts of the Philippines in Mountain Province following its division from the at-large district on two occasions between 1935 and 1969. It was first created in 1935 under Act No. 4203 of the Philippine Legislature for the first elections to the National Assembly and the first under the 1935 Constitution. The district was originally composed of the sub-province of Ifugao, and the municipalities of Bauko, Besao, and Tadian (formerly known as Kayan), part of the sub-province of Bontoc. It was a single-member district throughout the two legislatures of the Commonwealth National Assembly from 1935 to 1941, before it was dissolved into a two-member at-large district for the National Assembly of the Second Republic. It was later re-created in 1945 and reverted to a single-member district for the first eight legislatures of the House of Representatives from 1945 to 1969.

It was formally abolished in 1969 following the passage of Republic Act No. 4695 in 1966, which created the province of Ifugao, together with Benguet, Kalinga-Apayao, and the smaller Mountain Province. The sub-province of Ifugao was redistricted to a new at-large district, while the other towns that were part of the sub-province of Bontoc were redistricted to Benguet's at-large district. The district was last represented by Luis Hora of the Liberal Party.

== List of members representing the district ==
=== National Assembly (1935–1944) ===
==== Commonwealth ====
No.	Portrait	Member	Term of office		Legislature	Party	Electoral history	Constituent LGUs
No.	Portrait	Member	Start	End	Legislature	Party	Electoral history	Constituent LGUs
District created July 23, 1935.
1		George K. Tait	November 15, 1935	December 30, 1938	1st National Assembly	Nacionalista Democratico	Elected in 1935.	1935–1941; Sub-province: Ifugao Municipalities (part of the sub-province of Bontoc): Bauko, Besao, Kayan
2		Miguel Gumangan	December 30, 1938	December 30, 1941	2nd National Assembly	Nacionalista	Elected in 1938.	1935–1941; Sub-province: Ifugao Municipalities (part of the sub-province of Bontoc): Bauko, Besao, Kayan
District dissolved into Mountain Province's at-large district for the Second Republic National Assembly.

=== House of Representatives (1945–1973) ===
No.	Portrait	Member	Term of office		Legislature	Party	Electoral history	Constituent LGUs
No.	Portrait	Member	Start	End	Legislature	Party	Electoral history	Constituent LGUs
District re-created May 24, 1945.
3		Gregorio Marrero	June 9, 1945	May 25, 1946	1st Commonwealth Congress	Nacionalista	Elected in 1941.	1945–1959; Sub-province: Ifugao Municipalities (part of the sub-province of Bontoc): Bauko, Besao, Kayan
4		Gabriel Dunuan	May 25, 1946	December 30, 1953	2nd Commonwealth Congress	Nacionalista	Elected in 1946.	1945–1959; Sub-province: Ifugao Municipalities (part of the sub-province of Bontoc): Bauko, Besao, Kayan
4		Gabriel Dunuan	May 25, 1946	December 30, 1953	1st Congress	Nacionalista	Elected in 1946.	1945–1959; Sub-province: Ifugao Municipalities (part of the sub-province of Bontoc): Bauko, Besao, Kayan
4		Gabriel Dunuan	May 25, 1946	December 30, 1953	2nd Congress	Liberal	Re-elected in 1949.	1945–1959; Sub-province: Ifugao Municipalities (part of the sub-province of Bontoc): Bauko, Besao, Kayan
5		Luis Hora	December 30, 1953	December 30, 1969	3rd Congress	Nacionalista	Elected in 1953.	1945–1959; Sub-province: Ifugao Municipalities (part of the sub-province of Bontoc): Bauko, Besao, Kayan
5		Luis Hora	December 30, 1953	December 30, 1969	4th Congress	Nacionalista	Re-elected in 1957.	1945–1959; Sub-province: Ifugao Municipalities (part of the sub-province of Bontoc): Bauko, Besao, Kayan
5		Luis Hora	December 30, 1953	December 30, 1969	4th Congress	Nacionalista	Re-elected in 1957.	1959–1969; Sub-province: Ifugao Municipalities (part of the sub-province of Bontoc): Bauko, Besao, Tadian
5		Luis Hora	December 30, 1953	December 30, 1969	5th Congress	Nacionalista	Re-elected in 1961.	1959–1969; Sub-province: Ifugao Municipalities (part of the sub-province of Bontoc): Bauko, Besao, Tadian
5		Luis Hora	December 30, 1953	December 30, 1969	6th Congress	Liberal	Re-elected in 1965.	1959–1969; Sub-province: Ifugao Municipalities (part of the sub-province of Bontoc): Bauko, Besao, Tadian
District dissolved into Ifugao's at-large and Mountain Province's at-large districts.

== Election results ==
=== 1953 ===
1953 Philippine House of Representatives elections in Mountain Province
Party	Candidate	Votes	%
Nacionalista	Luis Hora	5,940	40.69
Liberal	Gabriel Dunuan (incumbent)	4,045	27.71
Nacionalista	William Beyer	3,472	23.78
Liberal	Esteban Ligos	587	4.02
Democratic	Victor Codamon	554	3.80
Total votes		14,598	100.00
Nacionalista gain from Liberal			

=== 1965 ===
1965 Philippine House of Representatives elections in Mountain Province
Party	Candidate	Votes	%
Liberal	Luis Hora (incumbent)	5,185	31.95
Independent	Napoleon Hangdaan	3,887	23.95
Nacionalista (ind.)	Teofilo Pilando	3,629	22.36
Independent	Julia Ponchinlan	2,190	13.49
Nacionalista	Joaquin Dugyon	1,059	6.53
Progressive	Joaquin Dunuan	277	1.71
Progressive	David Gadit	2	0.01
Total votes		16,229	100.00
Liberal hold			

== See also ==
- Legislative districts of Mountain Province
