= 1965 Iloilo's 3rd congressional district special election =

- November 9, 1965

Iloilo's 3rd congressional district
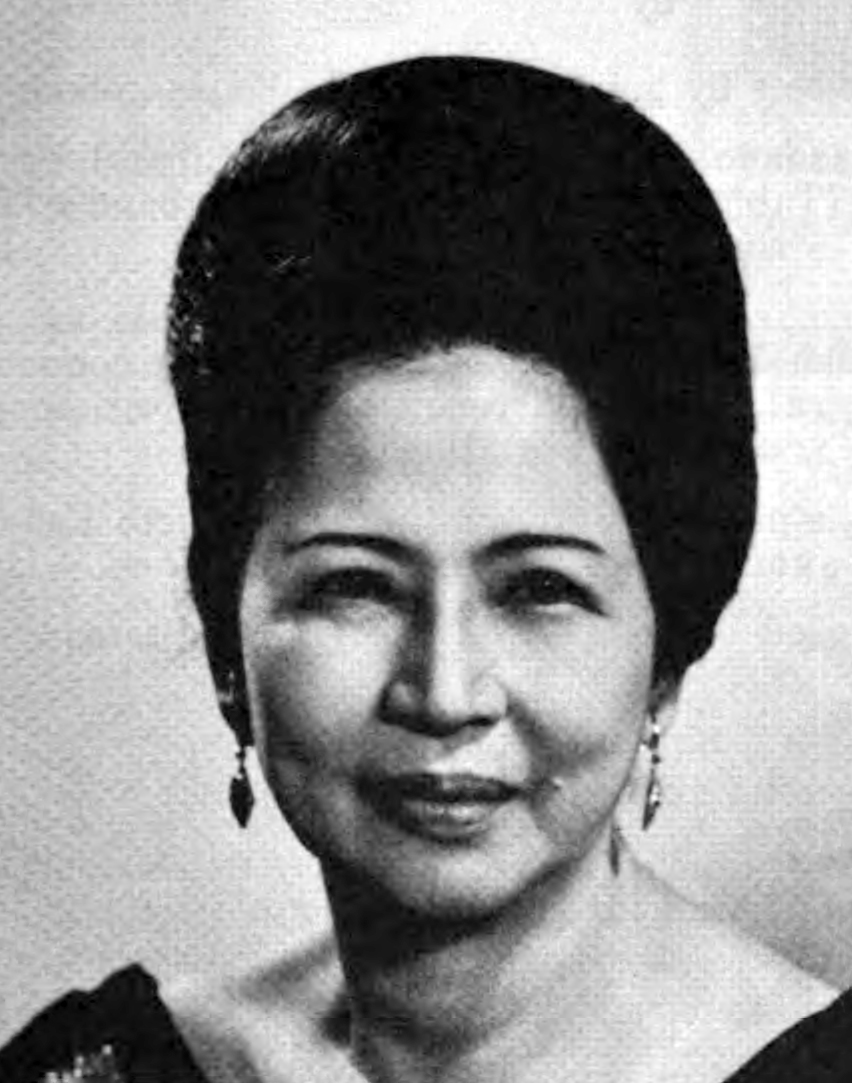

Candidate	Gloria Tabiana	Domitilo Abordo
Party	Liberal	Nacionalista
Popular vote	30,761	24,156
Percentage	55.99	30.17
Representative before election
Ramon Tabiana
Liberal
Representative-elect
Gloria Tabiana
Liberal

A special election was held for Iloilo's 3rd district seat to the House of Representatives of the Philippines on November 9, 1965. The erstwhile incumbent, Ramon Tabiana, died in office. The results of the general election held on November 9, 1965 then stood as the result for the special election as well, with the winner, Ramon's widow Gloria, sworn into office at the lame duck session of the outgoing 5th Congress, then served in the upcoming 6th Congress, as well.

The district during this time consisted of central Iloilo municipalities of Cabatuan, Janiuay, Leon, New Lucena, Maasin, San Miguel, Santa Barbara, and Zarraga.

== Electoral system ==
All seats in the House of Representatives were elected from single member districts, under the first-past-the-post voting system. Under the Revised Election Code, when a seat becomes vacant prior to ten months before the general election, the president, as soon as he is notified by the chamber where the vacancy occurred, shall call a special election.

== Results ==
Former Finance secretary Rufino Hechanova was sent by the Liberal Party to assess which among their politicians can win in this district. It was discovered that only Ramon Tabiana's widow Gloria could win there, and was proclaimed by President Diosdado Macapagal as their candidate without benefit of a political convention. Tabiana faced former representative Domitilo Abordo in the election, and won in seven out of the ten towns in the district.

1965 Iloilo's 3rd congressional district special election/1965 Philippine House of Representatives election at Iloilo's 3rd congressional district
Candidate	Party	Votes	%
Gloria Tabiana	Liberal Party	30,761	55.99
Domitilo Abordo	Nacionalista Party	24,156	43.97
Severino Simundo	Republican Party (independent)	20	0.04
Total		54,937	100.00
Liberal Party hold			
Source: COMELEC

Tabiana was eventually re-elected in 1969 and served in Congress until the declaration of martial law on September 23, 1972.

== See also ==
- Widow's succession
