= Davao Oriental's at-large congressional district =

Legislative district of the Philippines

Davao Oriental's at-large congressional district is an obsolete congressional district that encompassed the entire province of Davao Oriental in the Philippines. It was represented in the House of Representatives from 1968 to 1972 and in the Regular Batasang Pambansa from 1984 to 1986. The province of Davao Oriental was created as a result of the partition of Davao in 1967 and elected its first representative provincewide at-large during the 1967 Philippine House of Representatives special elections. Constancio P. Maglana served as this district's first representative. The district remained a single-member district until the dissolution of the lower house in 1972. It was later absorbed by the multi-member Region XI's at-large district for the national parliament in 1978. In 1984, provincial and city representations were restored and Davao Oriental elected one member for the regular parliament. The district was abolished following the 1987 reapportionment to establish two districts under a new constitution.

== Representation history ==
#	Member	Term of office		Congress	Party	Electoral history
#	Member	Start	End	Congress	Party	Electoral history
=== Davao Oriental's at-large district for the House of Representatives of the Philippines ===
District created May 8, 1967 from Davao's at-large district.
1	Constancio P. Maglana	January 22, 1968	September 23, 1972	6th	Nacionalista	Elected in 1967 special election.
1	Constancio P. Maglana	January 22, 1968	September 23, 1972	7th	Nacionalista	Re-elected in 1969. Removed from office after imposition of martial law.
District dissolved into the ten-seat Region XI's at-large district for the Interim Batasang Pambansa.
#	Member	Term of office		Batasang Pambansa	Party	Electoral history
#	Member	Start	End	Batasang Pambansa	Party	Electoral history
=== Davao Oriental's at-large district for the Regular Batasang Pambansa ===
District re-created February 1, 1984.
2	Merced Edith N. Rabat	July 23, 1984	March 25, 1986	2nd	KBL	Elected in 1984.
District dissolved into Davao Oriental's 1st and 2nd districts.

== See also ==
- Legislative districts of Davao Oriental
