= Luis Hora =

Filipino geologist and politician (1910–1972)

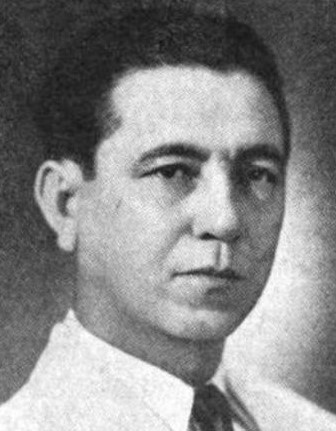
- Hora's official portrait during the 6th Congress

Member of the Philippine House of Representatives from Mountain Province's 3rd district
- In office December 30, 1953 – December 30, 1969
- Preceded by: Gabriel Dunuan
- Succeeded by: District abolished

Personal details
- Born: June 10, 1910 Mankayan, Mountain Province, Philippine Islands
- Died: March 28, 1972 (aged 61)
- Party: Liberal (1965–1969); Nacionalista (1953–1965)
- Spouse: Gregoria Marrero

Luis Rivera Hora (June 10, 1910 – March 28, 1972) was a Filipino geologist and politician who served as the representative for Mountain Province's 3rd congressional district in the Philippine House of Representatives from 1953 to 1969.

== Early life and education ==
Luis Rivera Hora was born on June 10, 1910, in Balili, Mankayan, Mountain Province, as the third of five children of Alfredo Hora and Margarita Rivera. His father was an Czech-American and one of the first miners in Mankayan, owning mining claims and teaching him mining methods and prospecting at an early age.

Hora attended Balili Primary School and Trinidad Valley Farm School, where he learned various skills, including typing, office work, carpentry, mechanics, farming, and blacksmithing. He later transferred to Saint Louis High School during his senior year and graduated from the institution. Years later, he enrolled at Baguio Colleges, where he studied law for four years but discontinued his studies after his election to the House of Representatives in 1953.

== Early career ==
Hora began his career as secretary to former Mountain Province representative Clement Irving and later served as assistant secretary-treasurer of the Baguio Chamber of Commerce. He subsequently worked as a mining prospector for Marsman and Co. in Mountain Province and Camarines Norte, and as a geologist, prospector, and shift head at Paracale Gold Mines. He also served as an investigator of mining claims for then-House speaker Manuel Roxas.

In 1941, Hora was serving as a municipal councilor of Mankayan when World War II broke out. He served in the United States Army Forces in the Far East (USAFFE) as a radio operator and was later appointed mayor of Kayan (now Tadian) in Bontoc during the Japanese occupation, continuing in the position after liberation. He also worked as a secret agent in the resistance movement, supplying information to guerrilla units.

In 1946, Roxas backed Hora's candidacy for Congress, but Hora was defeated. Roxas later appointed him deputy provincial governor of Benguet, a position he held from 1947 to 1953.

== House of Representatives ==
In 1953, Hora was elected to the House of Representatives under the Nacionalista Party, representing Mountain Province's 3rd congressional district, which comprised the sub-province of Ifugao and the municipalities of Bauko, Besao, and Kayan in the sub-province of Bontoc. He defeated incumbent Liberal Party candidate Gabriel Dunuan. Hora was re-elected in 1957 and served as chairman of the House Committee on National Minorities during the 4th Congress. Following his re-election in 1961 and 1965, Hora served during the 5th and 6th Congresses as chairman of the House Committee on Mines and vice chairman of the Committee on National Minorities. He ran under the Liberal Party in 1965.

Some of the laws Hora principally authored included measures on mining and local development:

Republic Act	Title	Source
R.A. No. 3089	An Act to Provide for Assistance to the Gold Mining Industry	
R.A. No. 4071	An Act Creating the Mountain Province Development Authority, Prescribing its Powers, Functions and Duties, Authorizing the Appropriation of Funds Therefor, and for Other Purposes	
R.A. No. 4167	An Act to Amend Certain Sections of Republic Act Numbered Eighteen Hundred Twenty-Eight Authorizing the Development, Exploitation and Utilization of the Mineral Deposits in the Surigao Reservation, as Amended by Republic Act Numbered Two Thousand Seventy-Seven	

In 1967, the district was dissolved into the newly created at-large congressional districts of Ifugao and Mountain Province. Hora retired from public office in 1969 after completing four legislative terms.

== Personal life and legacy ==
Hora was married to Gregoria Marrero, with whom he had a daughter, Purita. He died on March 28, 1972 from a heart attack.

In 1984, Batas Pambansa Blg. 836 renamed the Mountain Province General Hospital as the Luis Hora Memorial Hospital in his honor.

== Electoral history ==
Electoral history of Luis Hora
Year	Office	Party	Votes received				Result
Year	Office	Party	Total	%	P.	Swing	Result
1957	Representative (Mountain Province–3rd)	Nacionalista	5,940	40.69%	1st	—N/a	Won
1953	Representative (Mountain Province–3rd)	Nacionalista	—N/a	—N/a	1st	—N/a	Won
1961	Representative (Mountain Province–3rd)	Nacionalista	—N/a	—N/a	1st	—N/a	Won
1965	Representative (Mountain Province–3rd)	Liberal	5,185	31.95%	1st	—N/a	Won

House of Representatives of the Philippines
Preceded by Gabriel Dunuan	Member of the Philippine House of Representatives for Mountain Province's 3rd district 1953–1969	District abolished
