= Davao's at-large congressional district =

Legislative district of the Philippines

Davao's at-large congressional district may refer to several occasions when a provincewide at-large district was used for elections to the various Philippine national legislatures from the undivided province of Davao.

The Spanish colonial district of Davao, formerly the province of Nueva Guipúzcoa, was represented in the Malolos Congress following its reorganization in 1898 for the National Assembly of the First Philippine Republic. Two representatives from Luzon were appointed by the assembly to represent the province, namely León María Guerrero from Manila and Ceferino Pantoja from Nueva Vizcaya. After the fall of the First Republic, the province was abolished with its territory reverted to a district annexed to Moro Province under U.S. civilian rule in 1903. Moro Province was unrepresented in the Philippine Assembly.

Provincial government was re-established in Davao in 1914 but was not entitled to its own representation in the national legislature. Instead, it remained a part of the larger constituency of the Department of Mindanao and Sulu under the Bureau of Non-Christian Tribes whose representatives were appointed by the Governor General beginning in 1916. In 1934 following the passage of the Tydings–McDuffie Act, Davao elected its own delegate for the first time to the 1934 Philippine Constitutional Convention which was charged with the drafting of a new constitution for the Commonwealth of the Philippines. The province then began to send a representative to the Commonwealth National Assembly from its single-member at-large district created under the 1935 constitution.

Davao was also represented in the Second Republic National Assembly during the Pacific War. It also elected a representative to the restored House of Representatives and to the first six congresses under the Third Philippine Republic. After the 1967 division of Davao, the district was abolished and replaced by Davao del Norte's, Davao del Sur's and Davao Oriental's at-large districts.

== Representation history ==
#	Term of office		National Assembly	Seat A				Seat B			
#	Start	End	National Assembly	Image	Member	Party	Electoral history	Image	Member	Party	Electoral history
=== Davao's at-large district for the Malolos Congress ===
District created June 18, 1898.
–	September 15, 1898	March 23, 1901	1st		León María Guerrero	Independent	Appointed.		Ceferino Pantoja	Independent	Appointed.
#	Term of office		National Assembly	Single seat				Seats eliminated			
#	Start	End	National Assembly	Image	Member	Party	Electoral history	Seats eliminated			
=== Davao's at-large district for the National Assembly (Commonwealth of the Philippines) ===								Seats eliminated			
District re-created February 8, 1935.								Seats eliminated			
1	September 16, 1935	December 30, 1938	1st		Romualdo C. Quimpo	Nacionalista; Democrático	Elected in 1935.	Seats eliminated			
2	December 30, 1938	December 30, 1941	2nd		César M. Sotto	Nacionalista	Elected in 1938.	Seats eliminated			
#	Term of office		National Assembly	Seat A				Seat B			
#	Start	End	National Assembly	Image	Member	Party	Electoral history	Image	Member	Party	Electoral history
=== Davao's at-large district for the National Assembly (Second Philippine Republic) ===
District re-created September 7, 1943.
–	September 25, 1943	February 2, 1944	1st		Juan A. Sarenas	KALIBAPI	Elected in 1943.		Romualdo C. Quimpo	KALIBAPI	Appointed as an ex officio member.
#	Term of office		Common wealth Congress	Single seat				Seats eliminated			
#	Start	End	Common wealth Congress	Image	Member	Party	Electoral history	Seats eliminated			
=== Davao's at-large district for the House of Representatives of the Commonwealth of the Philippines ===								Seats eliminated			
District re-created May 24, 1945.								Seats eliminated			
3	June 9, 1945	May 25, 1946	1st		Juan A. Sarenas	Nacionalista	Elected in 1941.	Seats eliminated			
#	Term of office		Congress	Single seat				Seats eliminated			
#	Start	End	Congress	Image	Member	Party	Electoral history	Seats eliminated			
=== Davao's at-large district for the House of Representatives of the Philippines ===								Seats eliminated			
4	May 25, 1946	December 30, 1949	1st		Apolinario Cabigon	Nacionalista	Elected in 1946.	Seats eliminated			
5	December 30, 1949	December 30, 1957	2nd		Ismael L. Veloso	Nacionalista	Elected in 1949.	Seats eliminated			
5	December 30, 1949	December 30, 1957	3rd		Ismael L. Veloso	Nacionalista	Re-elected in 1953.	Seats eliminated			
6	December 30, 1957	December 30, 1961	4th		Gabino Rivera Sepulveda	Liberal	Elected in 1957.	Seats eliminated			
(5)	December 30, 1961	December 30, 1965	5th		Ismael L. Veloso	Nacionalista	Elected in 1961.	Seats eliminated			
7	December 30, 1965	January 22, 1968	6th		Lorenzo Sarmiento	Liberal	Elected in 1965. Redistricted to Davao del Norte's at-large district.	Seats eliminated			
District dissolved into Davao del Norte's, Davao del Sur's and Davao Oriental's at-large districts.								Seats eliminated			

== See also ==
- Legislative districts of Davao del Norte
- Legislative districts of Davao del Sur
- Legislative districts of Davao Oriental
