= Davao del Norte's at-large congressional district =

Legislative district of the Philippines

Davao del Norte's at-large congressional district is an obsolete congressional district that encompassed the entire province of Davao del Norte in the Philippines. It was represented in the House of Representatives from 1968 to 1972 and in the Regular Batasang Pambansa from 1984 to 1986. The province of Davao del Norte was created as a result of the partition of Davao in 1967 and elected its first representative provincewide at-large during the 1969 Philippine House of Representatives elections. Lorenzo Sarmiento who served as representative of Davao's at-large congressional district during the partition was this district's first representative. The district remained a single-member district until the dissolution of the lower house in 1972. It was later absorbed by the multi-member Region XI's at-large district for the national parliament in 1978. In 1984, provincial and city representations were restored and Davao del Norte elected three members for the regular parliament. The district was abolished following the 1987 reapportionment to establish three districts under a new constitution.

== Representation history ==
#	Term of office		Congress	Single seat											
#	Start	End	Congress	Image	Member	Party	Electoral history								
=== Davao del Norte's at-large district for the House of Representatives of the Philippines ===
District created May 8, 1967 from Davao's at-large district.
1	January 22, 1968	September 23, 1972	6th		Lorenzo Sarmiento	Liberal	Redistricted from Davao's at-large district.								
1	January 22, 1968	September 23, 1972	7th		Lorenzo Sarmiento	Nacionalista	Re-elected in 1969. Removed from office after imposition of martial law.								
District dissolved into the ten-seat Region XI's at-large district for the Interim Batasang Pambansa.
#	Term of office		Batasang Pambansa	Seat A				Seat B				Seat C			
#	Start	End	Batasang Pambansa	Image	Member	Party	Electoral history	Image	Member	Party	Electoral history	Image	Member	Party	Electoral history
=== Davao del Norte's at-large district for the Regular Batasang Pambansa ===
District re-created February 1, 1984.
–	July 23, 1984	March 25, 1986	2nd		Rodolfo P. del Rosario	KBL	Elected in 1984.		Rolando C. Marcial	UNIDO	Elected in 1984.		Rogelio M. Sarmiento	KBL	Elected in 1984.
District dissolved into Davao del Norte's 1st, 2nd and 3rd districts.

== See also ==
- Legislative districts of Davao del Norte
