= Gloria Tabiana =

Filipino politician (1907–1989)

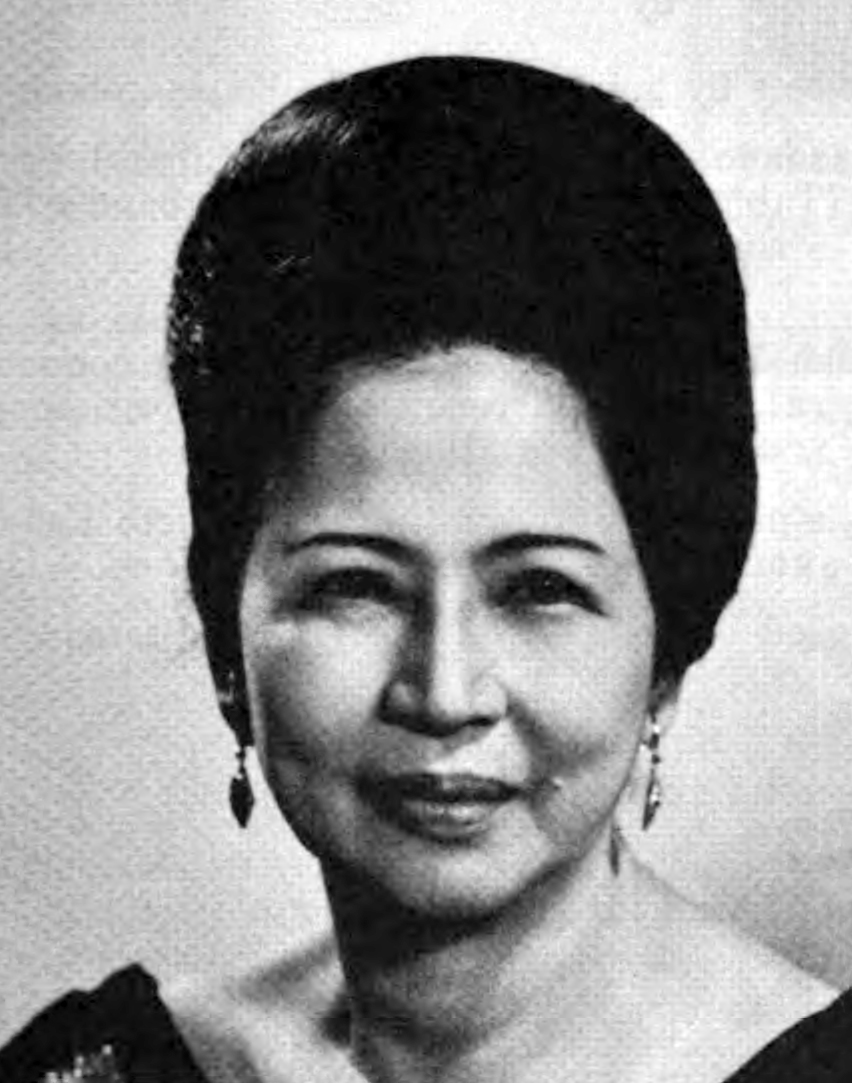
- Tabiana's official portrait during the 6th Congress

Member of the Philippine House of Representatives from Iloilo's 3rd district
- In office November 9, 1965 – January 17, 1973
- Preceded by: Ramon Tabiana
- Succeeded by: District abolished (seat later held by Licurgo Tirador in 1987)

Personal details
- Born: April 22, 1907 Iloilo City, Iloilo, Philippine Islands
- Died: March 4, 1989 (aged 81) Makati, Philippines
- Party: Nacionalista (1969–1989)
- Other political affiliations: Liberal (1965–1969)
- Spouse: Ramon Tabiana
- Parent: Ruperto Montinola (father)

Gloria Benedicto Montinola-Tabiana (April 22, 1907 – March 4, 1989) was a Filipino politician who served as the representative for Iloilo's 3rd congressional district in the Philippine House of Representatives from 1965 to 1969.

She was the daughter of former Philippine senator Ruperto Montinola.

== Early life and education ==
Gloria Benedicto Montinola was born on April 22, 1907, in Iloilo City, Iloilo, as one of the six children of former governor Ruperto Montinola and Basa Benedicto. She attended Assumption College, where she completed her secondary education as a scholar and gold medalist. She also took courses in secretarial studies and economics, as well as studies in English and Spanish.

== Early career ==
Tabiana began her government service as a private secretary to her father during his tenure as a senator. She also served on the staff of the Philippine Independence Mission in Washington, D.C., headed by Senator Sergio Osmeña and Representative Manuel Roxas. She later played a key role in her husband Ramon Tabiana's congressional campaigns by going door to door to campaign for his candidacy in Iloilo's 3rd congressional district.

== House of Representatives ==
On December 20, 1964, Ramon Tabiana died. The Liberal Party, led by President Diosdado Macapagal, sent former finance secretary Rufino Hechanova to assess potential candidates for the district. He determined that Tabiana was the only candidate with a chance of winning. She was eventually proclaimed the party's candidate without the need for an organized political convention.

In the November 9, 1965 election, Tabiana defeated former representative Domitilo Abordo, winning in seven of the district's ten municipalities. She was sworn into office during the lame-duck session of the outgoing 5th Congress and formally began her term in the 6th Congress. During her first term, she chaired the House Committee on Franchises and served as a member of six other committees.

Tabiana was re-elected in 1969 under the Nacionalista Party and served in the 7th Congress. Her second term ended in 1973 following the ratification of a new Constitution, which abolished Congress after President Ferdinand Marcos had declared martial law.

== Personal life ==
Tabiana had no children with her husband, Ramon. She died on March 4, 1989.

== Electoral history ==
Electoral history of Gloria Tabiana
Year	Office	Party	Votes received				Result
Year	Office	Party	Total	%	P.	Swing	Result
1965	Representative (Iloilo–3rd)	Liberal	30,761	55.99%	1st	—N/a	Won
1969	Representative (Iloilo–3rd)	Nacionalista	—N/a	—N/a	1st	—N/a	Won

House of Representatives of the Philippines
Preceded by Ramon Tabiana	Member of the Philippine House of Representatives for Iloilo's 3rd district 1965–1973	Vacant Martial law and adoption of the 1973 Constitution Title next held by Licurgo Tirador
