= Zamboanga del Norte's at-large congressional district =

Legislative district of the Philippines

Zamboanga del Norte's at-large congressional district is an obsolete congressional district that encompassed the area of Zamboanga del Norte in the Philippines. It was represented in the House of Representatives from 1953 to 1972 and in the Regular Batasang Pambansa from 1984 to 1986. The province of Zamboanga del Norte was created as a result of the partition of Zamboanga in 1952 and elected its first representative provincewide at-large during the 1953 Philippine House of Representatives elections. Alberto Ubay served as this district's first representative. The district remained a single-member district until the dissolution of the lower house in 1972. It was later absorbed by the multi-member Region IX's at-large district for the national parliament in 1978. In 1984, provincial and city representations were restored and Zamboanga del Norte elected two members for the regular parliament. The district was abolished following the 1987 reapportionment to establish three districts under a new constitution.

== Representation history ==
| # | Term of office | | Congress | Single seat | | | | | | | |
| # | Start | End | Congress | Image | Member | Party | Electoral history | | | | |
=== Zamboanga del Norte's at-large district for the House of Representatives of the Philippines ===
District created June 6, 1952 from Zamboanga's at-large district.
| 1 | December 30, 1953 | December 30, 1969 | 3rd | | Alberto Ubay | Nacionalista | Elected in 1953. | | | | |
| 1 | December 30, 1953 | December 30, 1969 | 4th | | Alberto Ubay | Nacionalista | Re-elected in 1957. | | | | |
| 1 | December 30, 1953 | December 30, 1969 | 5th | | Alberto Ubay | Nacionalista | Re-elected in 1961. | | | | |
| 1 | December 30, 1953 | December 30, 1969 | 6th | | Alberto Ubay | Liberal | Re-elected in 1965. | | | | |
| 2 | December 30, 1969 | September 23, 1972 | 7th | | Felipe B. Azcuna | Nacionalista | Elected in 1969. Removed from office after imposition of martial law. | | | | |
District dissolved into the eight-seat Region IX's at-large district for the Interim Batasang Pambansa.
| # | Term of office | | Batasang Pambansa | Seat A | | | | Seat B | | | |
| # | Start | End | Batasang Pambansa | Image | Member | Party | Electoral history | Image | Member | Party | Electoral history |
=== Zamboanga del Norte's at-large district for the Regular Batasang Pambansa ===
District re-created February 1, 1984.
| – | July 23, 1984 | March 25, 1986 | 2nd | | Romeo G. Jalosjos | KBL | Elected in 1984. | | Guardson R. Lood | KBL | Elected in 1984. |
District dissolved into Zamboanga del Norte's 1st, 2nd and 3rd districts.

== See also ==
- Legislative districts of Zamboanga del Norte
