= Lorenzo Sarmiento =

Filipino civil engineer and politician (1910–1993)

- Sarmiento's official portrait during the 6th Congress

Member of the Philippine House of Representatives
- In office June 30, 1987 – June 30, 1992
- Preceded by: District established
- Succeeded by: Rogelio Sarmiento
- Constituency: Davao del Norte's 1st district
- In office January 22, 1968 – January 17, 1973
- Preceded by: District established
- Succeeded by: District abolished (seat later held by Rodolfo del Rosario, Rolando Marcial and Rogelio Sarmiento in 1984)
- Constituency: Davao del Norte's at-large district
- In office December 30, 1965 – January 22, 1968
- Preceded by: Ismael Veloso
- Succeeded by: District abolished
- Constituency: Davao's at-large district

Personal details
- Born: August 10, 1910 San Jose del Monte, Bulacan, Philippine Islands
- Died: February 8, 1993 (aged 82)
- Party: LDP (1988–1993)
- Other political affiliations: LnB (1987–1988); Nacionalista (1969–1973); Liberal (1965–1969)
- Spouse: Luz Mercado
- Children: 7
- Education: Mapúa Institute of Technology (BS)

Lorenzo Sison Sarmiento Sr. (August 10, 1910 – February 8, 1993) was a Filipino civil engineer, businessman, and politician. He served as a member of the Philippine House of Representatives, representing Davao's at-large congressional district from 1965 to 1968, Davao del Norte's at-large district from 1968 to 1973, and Davao del Norte's 1st district from 1987 to 1992.

== Early life and education ==
Lorenzo Sison Sarmiento was born on August 10, 1910, in San Jose del Monte, Bulacan, to former town mayor Eulogio Sarmiento and Teodora Sison. He attended public schools and later earned a Bachelor of Science degree in civil engineering from the Mapúa Institute of Technology in 1933. He was recognized as an outstanding alumnus in 1962.

== Early career ==
In his youth, Sarmiento worked as a houseboy, daily laborer, and kainginero (a practitioner of kaingin, or slash-and-burn agriculture). He supported himself through college by working as a government mail carrier, messenger, and clerk in government offices. As a civil engineer, he served as an assistant civil engineer in the Bureau of Public Works in 1937 and was promoted to civil engineer in 1938. He was assigned to areas in Sulu, Davao, and Pangasinan until 1941. In 1938, he was assigned to prepare the blueprints for highways in Davao.

After resigning from government service, Sarmiento entered the lumber business and established plywood and lumber firms. He served as president of Sarmiento Enterprises, Inc., L.S. Sarmiento and Company, and the Davao City Development Bank. He also served as vice president of three other corporations.

== House of Representatives ==
Sarmiento was first elected to the House of Representatives in 1965, under the Liberal Party, representing the undivided province of Davao's at-large congressional district. He authored what was signed into law as Republic Act 4867 in 1967, dividing the Davao province into Davao del Norte, Davao del Sur, and Davao Oriental. Upon the province's partition, he later served as representative for Davao del Norte's at-large district. He was re-elected in 1969 under the Nacionalista Party, serving until 1973, when his term was cut short after the ratification of a new Constitution which abolished Congress following President Ferdinand Marcos's declaration of martial law.

Sarmiento successfully ran for the restored House in 1987 under Lakas ng Bansa, serving in the 8th Congress as chairman of the House Commmittee on Ethics.

== Personal life ==
Sarmiento was married to Luz Mercado, with whom he had seven children. He died on February 8, 1993.

House of Representatives of the Philippines
New district	Member of the Philippine House of Representatives for Davao del Norte's 1st district 1987–1992	Succeeded by Rogelio Sarmiento
New district	Member of the Philippine House of Representatives for Davao del Norte's at-large district 1968–1973	Vacant Martial law and adoption of the 1973 Constitution Title next held by Rodolfo del Rosario, Rolando Marcial and Rogelio Sarmiento (in the Batasang Pambansa)
Preceded by Ismael Veloso	Member of the Philippine House of Representatives for Davao's at-large district 1965–1968	District abolished
