= Alberto Ubay =

Filipino lawyer and politician

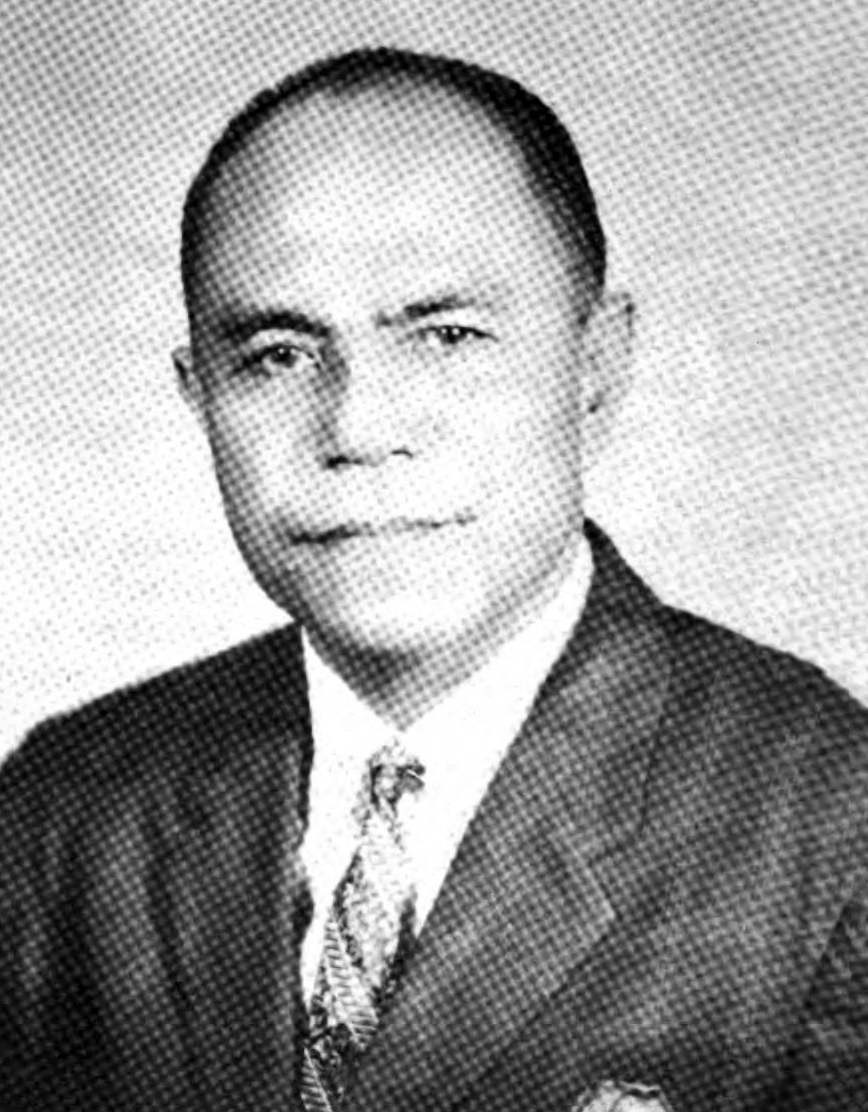
- Ubay's official portrait during the 6th Congress

Member of the Philippine House of Representatives from Zamboanga del Norte's at-large district
- In office December 30, 1953 – December 30, 1969
- Preceded by: District established
- Succeeded by: Felipe Azcuna

Governor of Zamboanga del Norte
- In office February 1, 1980 – March 25, 1986
- Vice Governor: Concordio Adriatico
- Preceded by: Virginio Lacaya
- Succeeded by: Isagani Amatong

Personal details
- Born: September 14, 1908 Merida, Leyte, Philippine Islands
- Party: LnB (1987)
- Other political affiliations: KBL (1980–1986); Liberal (1953–1957; 1965–1969); Nacionalista (1957–1965)
- Spouse: Milagros Realiza
- Children: 2
- Education: Silliman University (AA); Philippine Law School (LLB)

Alberto Quilantang Ubay (September 14, 1908 – after 1987) was a Filipino lawyer and politician who served as the representative for Zamboanga del Norte's at-large congressional district in the Philippine House of Representatives from 1953 until 1969. He later served as governor of Zamboanga del Norte from 1980 to 1986.

== Early life and education ==
Alberto Quilantang Ubay was born on September 14, 1908, in Barrio Calinangan, Merida, Leyte, to Braulio Ubay and Maria Quilantang. He attended grade schools in Merida and Pilar, Cebu, and graduated from Silliman Institute in 1929. He later earned an Associate in Arts degree from the university in 1931.

During college, he was a recognized debater on the Quezon debating team and won the YMCA's ₱50 first prize in a nationwide college freshman essay contest on "Prohibition." He used his winnings to pay for boat fare to Manila, where he intended to pursue law studies and find employment. He worked as a messenger in the office of Leyte Representative Carlos Tan and as a laborer-filer at the Bureau of Lands while earning his Bachelor of Laws degree from the Philippine Law School in 1935. He was admitted to the Bar that same year.

== Early career ==
Ubay began his career as an assistant attorney in the law office of Representative Paulino Gullas in Cebu. He later established his own law office in Ormoc, Leyte, and practiced law in Cebu City. He also served as a municipal councilor of Merida. In 1941, he was appointed justice of the peace of Merida.

Six months later, following the outbreak of World War II and the beginning of the Japanese occupation of the Philippines, Ubay joined the resistance movement. He served as a first lieutenant and later as judge advocate general of the Western Leyte guerrilla forces. He was subsequently named executive officer of the 2nd Battalion of the 96th Regiment. After the liberation, he served in the Judge Advocate General's Service of the Philippine Army until 1946.

After leaving the military, Ubay was appointed by President Manuel Roxas as assistant provincial fiscal of Zamboanga del Norte and later served as permanent fiscal. He returned to private law practice and founded the Manuel A. Roxas Law College in Dipolog, where he also served as dean. He sold his interests in the institution upon his election to Congress.

Ubay was elected governor of Zamboanga del Norte in 1959 but chose to remain as a member of the House of Representatives.

== House of Representatives (1953–1969) ==
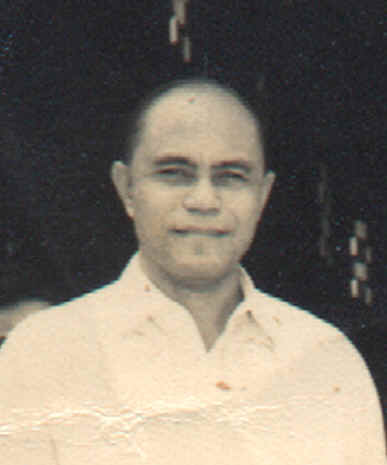
Undated photograph of Ubay

Ubay was elected to the House of Representatives in 1953, following the encouragement of friends to run for Congress. He initially ran under the Liberal Party but later joined the Nacionalista Party. During the 3rd Congress, he served as a member of four House committees. He was re-elected in 1957 and served in the 4th Congress as chairman of the House Committee on the Fishing Industry and vice chairman of the Committee on National Defense. Following his re-election in 1961, he served in the 5th Congress as chairman of the House Judiciary Committee and a subcommittee on Waterworks and Artesian Wells. In 1965, he was re-elected to the 6th Congress under the Liberal Party and served as a member of the House Electoral Tribunal.

As chairman of the House Judiciary Committee, Ubay issued a 38-page decision dismissing the impeachment complaint against President Diosdado Macapagal, citing American and British precedents to justify its dismissal for lack of merit.

During his congressional tenure, he secured and oversaw the completion of ₱25 million worth of public infrastructure projects, including roads, highways, concrete and steel bridges, hospitals, health centers, municipal halls, irrigation systems, river-control projects, wharves, and other public improvements.

He was known as the "father" of seven national schools, including two vocational institutions, a fishery school, a school of arts and trades, and three agricultural schools, one of which was later converted into a college through legislation:

Republic Act	Title	Institution established	Source
R.A. No. 1896	An Act to Establish, Organize and Maintain One National Agricultural School in the Province of Zamboanga del Norte and to Appropriate the Sum of Three Hundred Thousand Pesos for the Purpose	Zamboanga del Norte Agricultural College	
R.A. No. 2635	An Act to Provide for the Establishment of a School of Fisheries in the Municipality of Dipolog, Province of Zamboanga Del Norte, and to Authorize the Appropriation of Funds Therefor	Dipolog School of Fisheries	
R.A. No. 3002	An Act to Establish, Organize and Maintain a Regional National Secondary School of Arts and Trades in the Municipality of Dipolog, Province of Zamboanga Del Norte, to Be Known as the Zamboanga Del Norte School of Arts and Trades, and to Authorize the Appropriation of Funds for the Purpose	Zamboanga del Norte School of Arts and Trades	

More than half of the province's over 300 schools were established through his initiative. During the 5th Congress, a bill establishing Dipolog Normal College was enacted as Republic Act No. 3884. Ubay also authored and sponsored bills on judicial reforms and the standardization of salaries for justices, judges, fiscals, prosecutors, and other personnel under the Department of Justice.

== Governor of Zamboanga del Norte (1980–1986) ==
Ubay was elected governor of Zamboanga del Norte in 1980 under the Kilusang Bagong Lipunan, and served until 1986, following the People Power Revolution.

== Later career ==
Ubay ran for the seat representing Zamboanga del Norte's 2nd congressional district in the restored House of Representatives in 1987, but lost to Ernesto Amatong.

== Personal life ==
Ubay was married to Milagros Realiza, with whom he had two children.

House of Representatives of the Philippines
New district	Member of the Philippine House of Representatives for Zamboanga del Norte's at-large district 1953–1969	Succeeded by Felipe Azcuna
Political offices
Preceded by Virginio Lacaya	Governor of Zamboanga del Norte; 1980–1986	Succeeded by Isagani Amatong
