= 6th Congress of the Philippines =

23rd legislative term of the Philippines

←	5th	7th	→
- Old Legislative Building (c. 1988)

Overview
- Term: January 17, 1966 – June 17, 1969
- President: Ferdinand Marcos
- Vice President: Fernando Lopez

Senate
- Members: 24
- President: Arturo Tolentino (until January 26, 1967); Gil Puyat (from January 26, 1967)
- President pro tempore: Lorenzo Sumulong (until January 26, 1967); Jose Roy (from January 26, 1967)
- Majority leader: Jose Roy (until January 26, 1967); Rodolfo Ganzon (from January 26, 1967)
- Minority leader: Ambrosio Padilla

House of Representatives
- Members: 104
- Speaker: Cornelio Villareal (until February 2, 1967); Jose Laurel Jr. (from February 2, 1967)
- Speaker pro tempore: Salipada Pendatun (until February 2, 1967); Jose Aldeguer (from February 2, 1967)
- Majority leader: Justiniano Montano (until February 2, 1967); Marcelino Veloso (from February 2, 1967)
- Minority leader: Jose Laurel Jr. (until February 2, 1967); Cornelio Villareal (from February 2, 1967)

The 6th Congress of the Philippines (Filipino: Ikaanim na Kongreso ng Pilipinas), composed of the Philippine Senate and House of Representatives, met from January 17, 1966, until June 17, 1969, during the first three-and-a-half years of Ferdinand Marcos's presidency.

== Sessions ==
- First Special Session: January 17–22, 1966
- First Regular Session: January 24 – May 19, 1966
- Second Special Session: May 20 – June 18, 1966
- Third Special Session: August 15–27, 1966
- First Joint Session: April 25 and June 1, 1966
- Second Regular Session: January 23 – May 18, 1967
- Fourth Special Session: June 1 – July 5, 1967
- Fifth Special Session: July 17 – August 18, 1967
- Second Joint Session: January 30, February 13, February 27, March 8 and March 14–16, 1967
- Third Regular Session: January 22 – May 16, 1968
- Third Joint Session: February 20 – March 1, 1968
- Sixth Special Session: May 17–28, 1968
- Seventh Special Session: July 8 – August 10, 1968
- Eighth Special Session: August 12–31, 1968
- Fourth Regular Session: January 27 – May 22, 1969
- Ninth Special Session: June 2 – July 5, 1969
- Fourth Joint Session: June 11–17, 1969

== Legislation ==
The Sixth Congress passed a total of 1,481 laws. (Republic Act Nos. 4643 – 6123)

== Leadership ==
=== Senate ===
Senate President

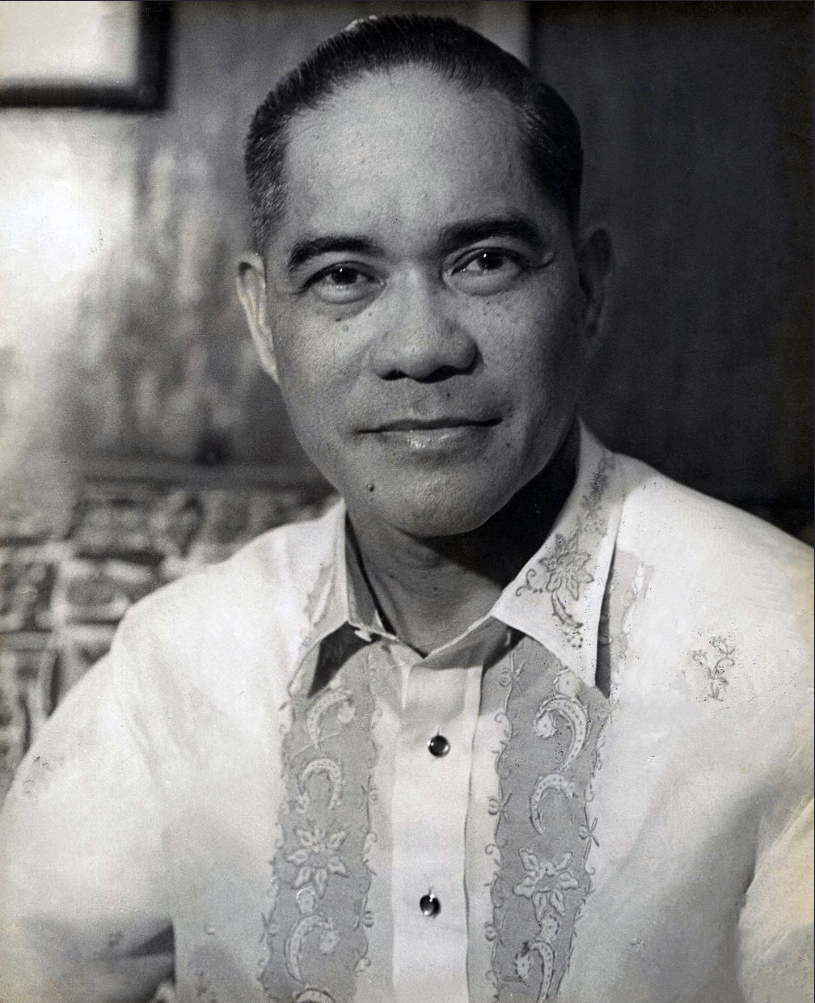
Arturo Tolentino,
until January 26, 1967

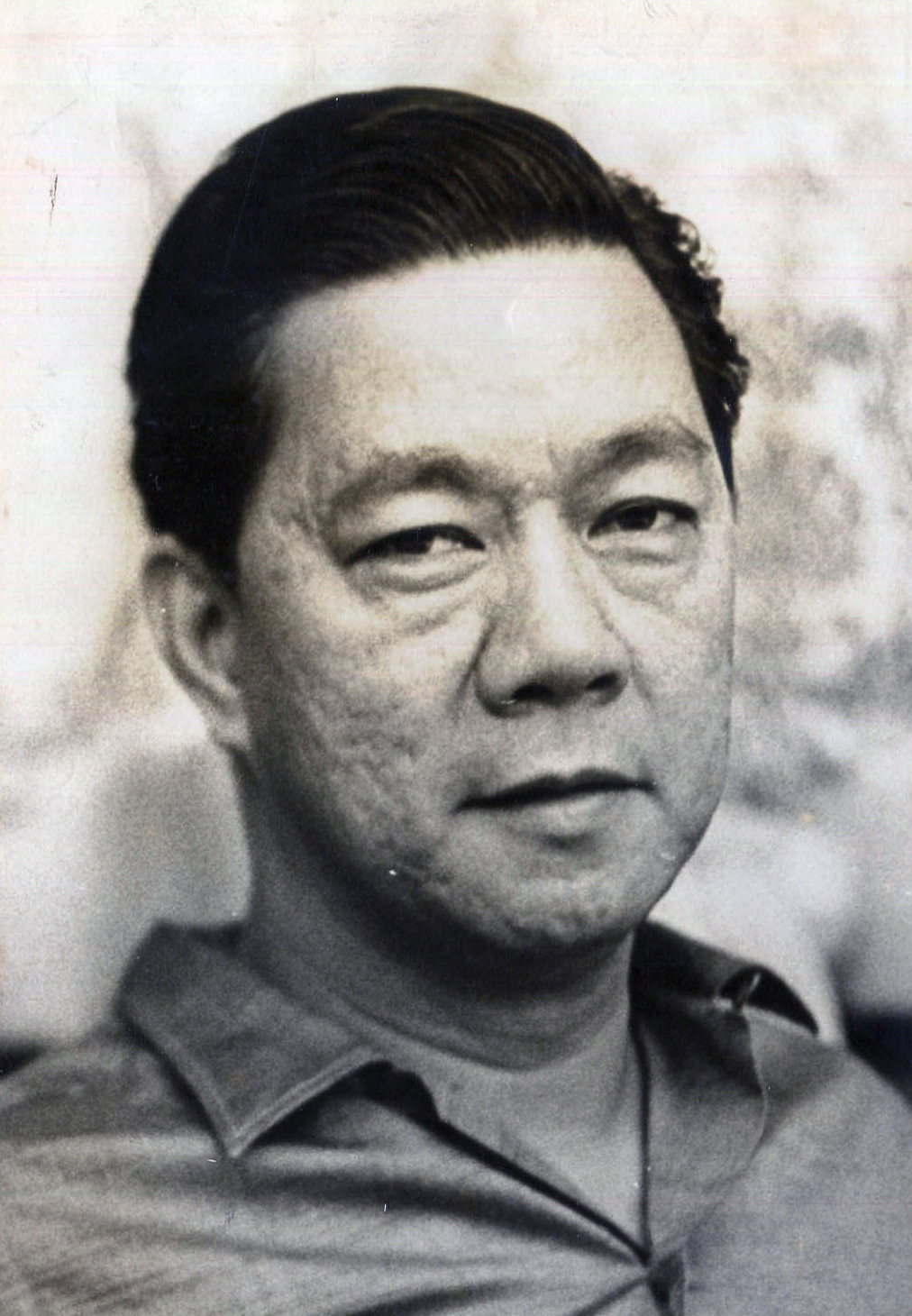
Gil Puyat,
from January 26, 1967

- President:
  - Arturo Tolentino (Nacionalista), until January 26, 1967
  - Gil Puyat (Nacionalista), from January 26, 1967
- President pro tempore:
  - Lorenzo Sumulong (Nacionalista), until January 26, 1967
  - Jose Roy (Nacionalista), from January 26, 1967
- Majority Floor Leader:
  - Jose Roy (Nacionalista), until January 26, 1967
  - Rodolfo Ganzon (Nacionalista), from January 26, 1967
- Minority Floor Leader: Ambrosio Padilla (Liberal)

=== House of Representatives ===
House Speaker

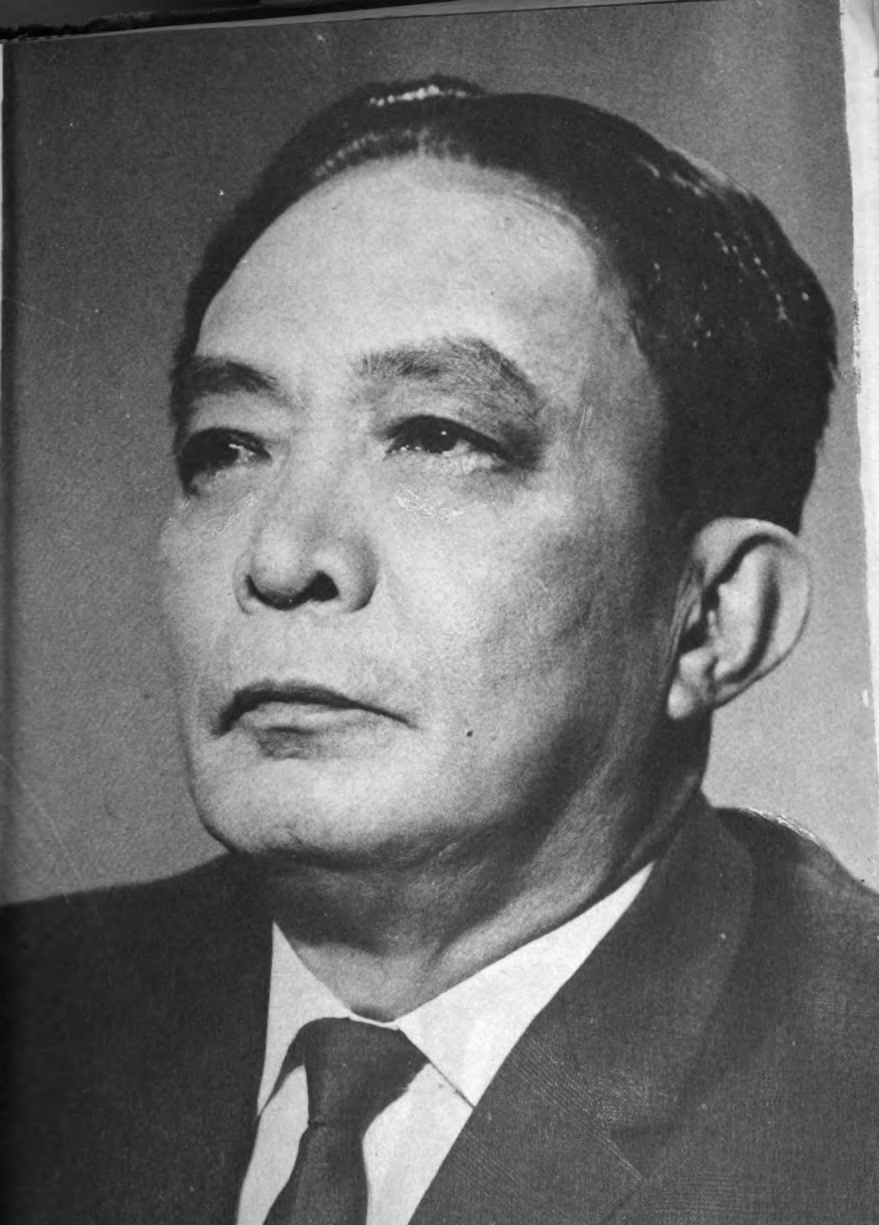
Cornelio Villareal,
until February 2, 1967

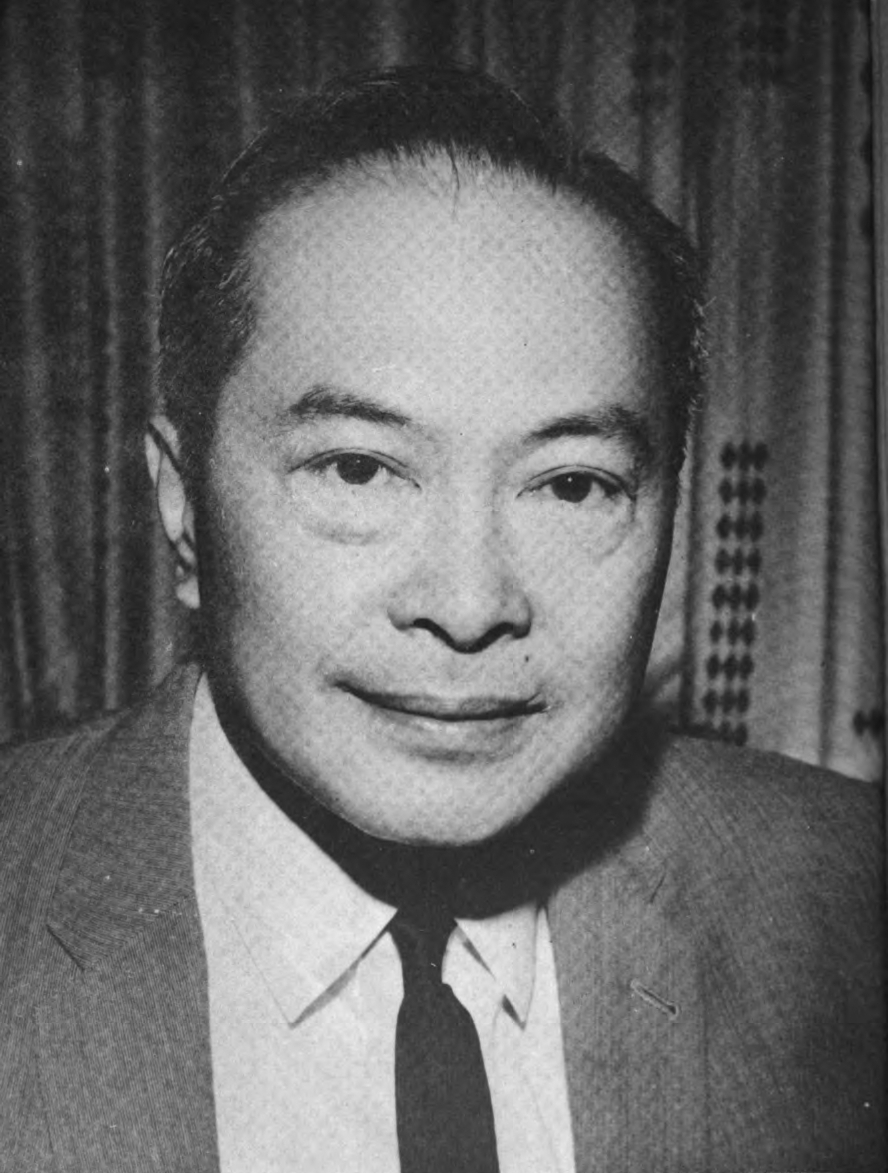
Jose Laurel Jr.,
from February 2, 1967

- Speaker:
  - Cornelio Villareal (Capiz–2nd, Liberal), until February 2, 1967
  - Jose Laurel Jr. (Batangas–3rd, Nacionalista), from February 2, 1967
- Speaker pro tempore:
  - Salipada Pendatun (Cotabato, Liberal), until February 2, 1967
  - Jose Aldeguer (Iloilo–5th, Nacionalista), from February 2, 1967
- Majority Floor Leader:
  - Justiniano Montano (Cavite, Nacionalista), until February 2, 1967
  - Marcelino Veloso (Leyte–3rd, Nacionalista), from February 2, 1967
- Minority Floor Leader:
  - Jose Laurel Jr. (Batangas–3rd, Nacionalista), until February 2, 1967
  - Cornelio Villareal (Capiz–2nd, Liberal), from February 2, 1967

== Members ==
=== Senate ===
Composition of the Senate during the 6th Congress' 1st and 2nd (left), and 3rd & 4th (right) sessions.

The following are the terms of the senators of this Congress, according to the date of election:

- For senators elected on November 14, 1961: December 30, 1961 – December 30, 1967
- For senators elected on November 12, 1963: December 30, 1963 – December 30, 1969
- For senators elected on November 9, 1965: December 30, 1965 – December 30, 1971
- For senators elected on November 14, 1967: December 30, 1967 – December 30, 1973

Senator	Party	Term end
Alejandro Almendras	Nacionalista	1971
Gaudencio Antonino (Note: Gaudencio Antonino died on November 13, 1967.)	Liberal	1967
Magnolia Antonino	Nacionalista	1973
Ninoy Aquino	Liberal	1973
Dominador Aytona	Nacionalista	1971
Helena Benitez	Nacionalista	1973
Jose W. Diokno	Nacionalista	1969
Eva Estrada Kalaw	Nacionalista	1971
Rodolfo Ganzon	Nacionalista	1969
Maria Kalaw Katigbak	Liberal	1967
Wenceslao Lagumbay	Nacionalista	1971
Salvador Laurel	Nacionalista	1973
Juan Liwag	Liberal	1969
Genaro Magsaysay	Nacionalista	1971
Manuel Manahan	Liberal	1967
Raul Manglapus	Liberal	1967
Camilo Osias	Liberal	1967
Sergio Osmeña Jr.	Liberal	1971
Ambrosio Padilla	Liberal	1969
Emmanuel Pelaez	Nacionalista	1973
Leonardo B. Perez	Nacionalista	1973
Gil Puyat	Nacionalista	1969
Soc Rodrigo	Nacionalista	1967
Gerry Roxas	Liberal	1969
Jose Roy	Nacionalista	1967, 1973
Jovito Salonga	Liberal	1971
Tecla San Andres Ziga	Liberal	1969
Lorenzo Sumulong	Nacionalista	1967
Lorenzo Tañada	NCP	1971
Lorenzo Teves	Nacionalista	1973
Arturo Tolentino	Nacionalista	1969

=== House of Representatives ===
Composition of the House of Representatives during the 6th Congress.

Sixth Congress representation map of the Philippines

Province/City	District	Representative	Party
Abra	Lone	Carmelo Barbero	Liberal
Agusan	Lone	Jose C. Aquino	Liberal
Aklan	Lone	Rafael Legaspi	Nacionalista
Albay	1st	Venancio Ziga	Liberal
Albay	2nd	Carlos R. Imperial	Nacionalista
Albay	3rd	Josefina Duran	Liberal
Antique	Lone	Jose Fornier	Independent
Bataan	Lone	Pablo Roman	Liberal
Batanes	Lone	Aurora Abad	Liberal
Batangas	1st	Federico Serrano	Nacionalista
Batangas	2nd	Olegario Cantos	Liberal
Batangas	3rd	Jose Laurel Jr.	Nacionalista
Bohol	1st	Natalio Castillo	Nacionalista
Bohol	2nd	Jose Zafra	Nacionalista
Bohol	3rd	Teodoro Galagar	Nacionalista
Bukidnon	Lone	Benjamin Tabios	Liberal
Bulacan	1st	Teodulo Natividad	Nacionalista
Bulacan	2nd	Rogaciano Mercado	Nacionalista
Cagayan	1st	Tito Dupaya	Liberal
Cagayan	2nd	Benjamin Ligot	Liberal
Camarines Norte	Lone	Fernando Pajarillo	Nacionalista
Camarines Sur	1st	Ramon Felipe Jr.	Liberal
Camarines Sur	2nd	Felix Fuentebella	Nacionalista
Capiz	1st	Mariano Acuña	Liberal
Capiz	2nd	Cornelio Villareal	Liberal
Catanduanes	Lone	Jose M. Alberto	Liberal
Cavite	Lone	Justiniano Montano	Liberal
Cebu	1st	Ramon Durano Sr.	Nacionalista
Cebu	2nd	Jose Briones	Liberal
Cebu	3rd	Ernesto Bascon	Liberal
Cebu	4th	Isidro Kintanar	Nacionalista
Cebu	5th	Antonio Cuenco	Liberal
Cebu	6th	Amado Arrieta	Liberal
Cebu	7th	Tereso Dumon	Liberal
Cotabato	Lone	Salipada Pendatun	Liberal
Davao	Lone (Note: Davao's lone district was divided into Davao del Norte's lone district, Davao del Sur's lone district and Davao Oriental's lone district on May 8, 1967.)	Lorenzo Sarmiento (Note: Lorenzo Sarmiento was redistricted to Davao del Norte's lone district on January 22, 1968.)	Liberal
Davao del Norte	Lone (Note: Davao del Norte's lone district was created from Davao's lone district on May 8, 1967.)	Lorenzo Sarmiento (Note: Lorenzo Sarmiento was redistricted from Davao's lone district on January 22, 1968.)	Liberal
Davao del Sur	Lone (Note: Davao del Sur's lone district was created from Davao's lone district on May 8, 1967.)	Artemio Loyola (Note: Artemio A. Loyola was elected on November 14, 1967.)	Nacionalista
Davao Oriental	Lone (Note: Davao Oriental's lone district was created from Davao's lone district on May 8, 1967.)	Constancio Maglana (Note: Constancio P. Maglana was elected on November 14, 1967.)	Nacionalista
Eastern Samar	Lone	Felipe Abrigo	Liberal
Ilocos Norte	1st	Antonio Raquiza (Note: Antonio Raquiza was appointed as Secretary of Public Works, Transportation and Communications on August 24, 1966.)	Liberal
Ilocos Norte	1st	Roque Ablan Jr. (Note: Roque Ablan Jr. was elected on November 14, 1967, to succeed Antonio Raquiza.)	Nacionalista
Ilocos Norte	2nd	Simeon Valdez	Nacionalista
Ilocos Sur	1st	Floro Crisologo	Liberal
Ilocos Sur	2nd	Pablo Sanidad	Liberal
Iloilo	1st	Pedro Trono	Liberal
Iloilo	2nd	Fermin Caram Jr.	Nacionalista
Iloilo	3rd	Gloria Tabiana	Liberal
Iloilo	4th	Ricardo Ladrido	Liberal
Iloilo	5th	Jose Aldeguer	Nacionalista
Isabela	Lone	Melanio Singson	Liberal
La Union	1st	Magnolia Antonino (Note: Magnolia Antonino took office as Senator of the Philippines on December 30, 1967.)	Independent
La Union	2nd	Epifanio Castillejos	Nacionalista
Laguna	1st	Manuel Concordia	Liberal
Laguna	2nd	Magdaleno Palacol Sr.	Liberal
Lanao del Norte	Lone	Mohammad Ali Dimaporo	Liberal
Lanao del Sur	Lone	Rashid Lucman	Liberal
Leyte	1st	Artemio Mate	Nacionalista
Leyte	2nd	Salud Vivero-Parreño (Note: Salud Vivero Parreño died on December 27, 1969.)	Nacionalista
Leyte	3rd	Marcelino Veloso	Nacionalista
Leyte	4th	Dominador Tan	Liberal
Manila	1st	Fidel A. Santiago	Liberal
Manila	2nd	Joaquin R. Roces	Nacionalista
Manila	3rd	Sergio Loyola	Liberal
Manila	4th	Pablo V. Ocampo	Nacionalista
Marinduque	Lone	Francisco Lecaroz	Liberal
Masbate	Lone	Andres Clemente Jr.	Liberal
Misamis Occidental	Lone	William Chiongbian	Liberal
Misamis Oriental	Lone	Emmanuel Pelaez (Note: Emmanuel Pelaez took office as Senator of the Philippines on December 30, 1967.)	Independent
Mountain Province	1st	Juan Duyan	Liberal
Mountain Province	2nd	Andres Cosalan	Liberal
Mountain Province	3rd	Luis Hora	Liberal
Negros Occidental	1st	Armando Gustilo	Nacionalista
Negros Occidental	2nd	Felix Amante	Nacionalista
Negros Occidental	3rd	Felix Feria Jr.	Nacionalista
Negros Oriental	1st	Lorenzo Teves (Note: Lorenzo Teves took office as Senator of the Philippines on December 30, 1967.)	Nacionalista
Negros Oriental	2nd	Lamberto Macias	Nacionalista
Northern Samar	Lone	Eladio Balite (Note: Eladio Balite died on August 24, 1967.)	Liberal
Northern Samar	Lone	Eusebio Moore (Note: Eusebio Moore was elected on November 14, 1967, to succeed Eladio T. Balite.)	Nacionalista
Nueva Ecija	1st	Eugenio Baltao	Liberal
Nueva Ecija	2nd	Angel Concepcion	Nacionalista
Nueva Vizcaya	Lone	Leonardo B. Perez (Note: Leonardo B. Perez took office as Senator of the Philippines on December 30, 1967.)	Nacionalista
Occidental Mindoro	Lone	Pedro Medalla	Nacionalista
Oriental Mindoro	Lone	Luciano Joson	Liberal
Palawan	Lone	Ramon Mitra Jr.	Liberal
Pampanga	1st	Juanita L. Nepomuceno	Liberal
Pampanga	2nd	Angel Macapagal	Liberal
Pangasinan	1st	Aguedo Agbayani	Nacionalista
Pangasinan	2nd	Jack Laureano Soriano	Liberal
Pangasinan	3rd	Cipriano Primicias Jr.	Nacionalista
Pangasinan	4th	Amadeo J. Perez	Liberal
Pangasinan	5th	Jesus M. Reyes	Nacionalista
Quezon	1st	Manuel S. Enverga	Nacionalista
Quezon	2nd	Eladio Caliwara	Liberal
Rizal	1st	Eddie Ilarde	Liberal
Rizal	2nd	Frisco San Juan Sr.	Nacionalista
Romblon	Lone	Jose D. Moreno	Nacionalista
Sorsogon	1st	Salvador Encinas	Liberal
Sorsogon	2nd	Vicente Peralta	Nacionalista
South Cotabato	Lone (Note: South Cotabato's lone district was created from Cotabato's lone district on July 18, 1966.)	James Chiongbian (Note: James Chiongbian was elected on November 14, 1967.)	Nacionalista
Southern Leyte	Lone	Nicanor Yñiguez	Nacionalista
Sulu	Lone	Salih Ututalum (Note: Salih Ututalum was removed by the House of Representatives Electoral Tribunal on April 23, 1969, after an electoral protest.)	Liberal
Sulu	Lone	Indanan Anni (Note: Indanan M. Anni replaced Salih Ututalum on April 23, 1969, after winning an electoral protest.)	Nacionalista
Surigao del Norte	Lone	Constantino Navarro Sr.	Liberal
Surigao del Sur	Lone	Gregorio Murillo	Nacionalista
Tarlac	1st	Peping Cojuangco	Liberal
Tarlac	2nd	Jose V. Yap	Liberal
Western Samar	Lone	Fernando Veloso	Nacionalista
Zambales	Lone	Ramon Magsaysay Jr.	Liberal
Zamboanga del Norte	Lone	Alberto Ubay	Liberal
Zamboanga del Sur	Lone	Vincenzo Sagun	Liberal

== See also ==
- Congress of the Philippines
- Senate of the Philippines
- House of Representatives of the Philippines
- 1965 Philippine general election
- 1967 Philippine general election
