= Results of the 1992 Philippine House of Representatives elections =

The following are the results of the 1992 Philippine House of Representatives elections by legislative district.

== Abra ==
Incumbent Rudolfo Bernardez of the Nationalist People's Coalition ran for a second term, but was defeated by Jeremias Zapata of Lakas–NUCD.

Candidate	Party	Votes	%
Jeremias Zapata	Lakas–NUCD	31,731	49.32
Alberto Benesa	Kilusang Bagong Lipunan	16,996	26.42
Rudolfo Bernardez (incumbent)	Nationalist People's Coalition	9,264	14.40
Benjamin Bringas	Nationalist People's Coalition	6,342	9.86
Total		64,333	100.00
Source: Commission on Elections

== Agusan del Norte ==
=== Agusan del Norte's 1st district ===
Incumbent Charito Plaza of the Laban ng Demokratikong Pilipino was re-elected to a second term.

Candidate	Party	Votes	%
Charito Plaza (incumbent)	Laban ng Demokratikong Pilipino	50,529	60.95
Proceso Gonzales	Lakas–NUCD	29,373	35.43
Wenceslao Ponferrada	Koalisyong Pambansa	2,250	2.71
Pedrito Famorcan	Independent	645	0.78
Crisotelo Montalban Jr.	Kilusang Bagong Lipunan	102	0.12
Total		82,899	100.00
Source: Commission on Elections

=== Agusan del Norte's 2nd district ===
Incumbent Edelmiro Amante of Lakas–NUCD was re-elected to a second term.

Candidate	Party	Votes	%
Edelmiro Amante (incumbent)	Lakas–NUCD	42,074	59.74
Roberto Aquino	LDP/Independent	22,576	32.06
Soledad Cagampang-de Castro	Independent	5,773	8.20
Total		70,423	100.00
Source: Commission on Elections

== Agusan del Sur ==
Incumbent Democrito Plaza of the Laban ng Demokratikong Pilipino (LDP) ran for Governor of Agusan del Sur. The LDP, in coalition with Koalisyong Pambansa, nominated Generoso Sansaet, who was defeated by Ceferino Paredes Jr. of the Nationalist People's Coalition and Pagtinabangay.

Candidate	Party	Votes	%
Ceferino Paredes Jr.	NPC/Pagtinabangay	47,255	51.11
Generoso Sansaet	Koalisyong Pambansa	40,301	43.59
Ferdinand Ebarle	Lakas–NUCD	3,493	3.78
Bruno Aparri	KBL/Pagtinabangay	1,260	1.36
Viador Viajar	Kilusang Bagong Lipunan	60	0.06
Eliseo Capadocia	Independent	51	0.06
Marietta Juyo	Pag-asa ng Bayan	31	0.03
Total		92,451	100.00
Source: Commission on Elections

== Aklan ==
Incumbent Ramon Legaspi of the Nationalist People's Coalition ran for a second term, but was defeated by Allen Quimpo of Laban ng Demokratikong Pilipino.

Candidate	Party	Votes	%
Allen Quimpo	Laban ng Demokratikong Pilipino	68,413	49.20
Ramon Legaspi (incumbent)	Nationalist People's Coalition	45,348	32.61
Edmundo Tolentino	Lakas–NUCD	24,518	17.63
Juan Tumbocon	Kilusang Bagong Lipunan	431	0.31
Antonio Legaspi	Kilusang Bagong Lipunan	346	0.25
Total		139,056	100.00
Source: Commission on Elections

== Albay ==
=== Albay's 1st district ===
Incumbent Edcel Lagman of Laban ng Demokratikong Pilipino was re-elected to a second term.

Candidate	Party	Votes	%
Edcel Lagman (incumbent)	Laban ng Demokratikong Pilipino	52,051	56.46
Antonio Betito	Koalisyong Pambansa	34,741	37.69
Jose Madrilejos Jr.	Lakas–NUCD	4,658	5.05
Nelson Kallos	Kilusang Bagong Lipunan	501	0.54
Ysmael Zepeda	Partido ng Masang Pilipino	212	0.23
Juan Casil	Kilusang Bagong Lipunan	24	0.03
Total		92,187	100.00
Source: Commission on Elections

=== Albay's 2nd district ===
Incumbent Carlos R. Imperial of the Nationalist People's Coalition was re-elected to a second term.

Candidate	Party	Votes	%
Carlos R. Imperial (incumbent)	Nationalist People's Coalition	54,602	55.90
Hernandez Baldo	Laban ng Demokratikong Pilipino	40,098	41.05
Flordeliz Josue	Kilusang Bagong Lipunan	1,716	1.76
Ireneo delos Reyes	Lakas–NUCD	1,269	1.30
Total		97,685	100.00
Source: Commission on Elections

=== Albay's 3rd district ===
The seat was vacant after Elfren Sarte of the Liberal Party (later became part of Koalisyong Pambansa) died on July 22, 1988. Koalisyong Pambansa nominated Pura Ferrer-Calleja, who was defeated by Al Francis Bichara of the Nationalist People's Coalition.

Candidate	Party	Votes	%
Al Francis Bichara	Nationalist People's Coalition	36,788	44.58
Juan Sarte	Partido ng Masang Pilipino	14,802	17.94
Benjamin Matias	Lakas–NUCD	12,372	14.99
Donardo Paglinawan	Laban ng Demokratikong Pilipino	9,963	12.07
Roberto Ramin	Independent	3,811	4.62
Pura Ferrer-Calleja	Koalisyong Pambansa	2,462	2.98
Senen Burgos	Independent	1,885	2.28
Leoncio Opida	Nationalist People's Coalition	440	0.53
Total		82,523	100.00
Source: Commission on Elections

== Antique ==
Incumbent Exequiel Javier of Lakas–NUCD was re-elected to a second term.

Candidate	Party	Votes	%
Exequiel Javier (incumbent)	Lakas–NUCD	35,336	28.42
Salvacion Perez	Laban ng Demokratikong Pilipino	34,698	27.91
Merlita Lim	Nacionalista Party	16,047	12.91
Reynaldo Importante	Nationalist People's Coalition	14,741	11.86
Cornelio Aldon	Nationalist People's Coalition	10,777	8.67
Paz Flor Portia Pacificador	Kilusang Bagong Lipunan	7,024	5.65
Senen Burgos	Koalisyong Pambansa	5,720	4.60
Total		124,343	100.00
Source: Commission on Elections

== Aurora ==
Incumbent Benedicto Miran of Laban ng Demokratikong Pilipino won re-election to a second term.

Candidate	Party	Votes	%
Benedicto Miran (incumbent)	Laban ng Demokratikong Pilipino	13,200	29.42
Luis Etcubanez	Nationalist People's Coalition	9,969	22.22
Rodante Rubio	Koalisyong Pambansa	8,371	18.65
Isaias Noveras	Nacionalista Party	7,513	16.74
Josefina Angara	Lakas–NUCD	5,239	11.68
Rolly Santos	Partido Sambayanang Pilipino	571	1.27
Enrique Avancena	Independent	10	0.02
Total		44,873	100.00
Source: Commission on Elections

== Bacolod ==
Incumbent Romeo Guanzon of Laban ng Demokratikong Pilipino won re-election to a second term.

Candidate	Party	Votes	%
Romeo Guanzon (incumbent)	Laban ng Demokratikong Pilipino	63,320	
Alex Abastillas	Kilusang Bagong Lipunan		
Felix Amante	Kilusang Bagong Lipunan		
Kenneth Barredo	Nationalist People's Coalition		
Vincent Dudero	Independent		
Arturo Villaflor	Independent		
Total			
Source: Commission on Elections

== Baguio ==
Incumbent Honorato Aquino of Laban ng Demokratikong Pilipino ran for a second term, but was defeated by Bernardo Vergara of the Nationalist People's Coalition.

Candidate	Party	Votes	%
Bernardo Vergara	Nationalist People's Coalition	28,333	
Honorato Aquino (incumbent)	Laban ng Demokratikong Pilipino		
Venancio Duque	Lakas–NUCD		
Elmo Nevada	People's Reform Party		
Amado Orden	Kilusang Bagong Lipunan		
Felipe Ramos	Independent		
Total			
Source: Commission on Elections

== Basilan ==
Incumbent Alvin Dans of Koalisyong Pambansa ran for Governor of Basilan. Elnorita Tugung of Lakas–NUCD won the election.

Candidate	Party	Votes	%
Elnorita Tugung	Lakas–NUCD	17,037	36.79
Candu Muarip	Nacionalista Party	9,644	20.83
Bienvenido Martin	Nationalist People's Coalition	6,016	12.99
Hadji Asan Camlian	Kilusang Bagong Lipunan	5,681	12.27
Harisul Samanul	Laban ng Demokratikong Pilipino	3,704	8.00
Hudjaypa Lim	Kilusang Bagong Lipunan	1,917	4.14
Salvador Bernaldes	People's Reform Party	1,886	4.07
Rosalio Delgado	Partido ng Masang Pilipino	343	0.74
Mukim Gadong	Kilusang Bagong Lipunan	75	0.16
Total		46,303	100.00
Source: Commission on Elections

== Bataan ==
=== Bataan's 1st district ===
Incumbent Felicito Payumo of Koalisyong Pambansa was re-elected to a second term.

Candidate	Party	Votes	%
Felicito Payumo (incumbent)	Koalisyong Pambansa	47,939	58.43
Antonio Roman	Koalisyong Pambansa	34,103	41.57
Loreto Canlapan	Kilusang Bagong Lipunan	0	0.00
Total		82,042	100.00
Source: Commission on Elections

=== Bataan's 2nd district ===
Incumbent Tet Garcia of the Nationalist People's Coalition (NPC) ran for Governor of Bataan. The NPC nominated Dominador Venegas, who won the election.

Candidate	Party	Votes	%
Dominador Venegas	Nationalist People's Coalition	33,907	40.54
Pablo Roman Jr.	Laban ng Demokratikong Pilipino	30,535	36.51
Norberto Gonzales	Lakas–NUCD	16,772	20.05
Florencio de Guzman	Kilusang Bagong Lipunan	2,430	2.91
Total		83,644	100.00
Source: Commission on Elections

== Batanes ==
The seat was vacant after Florencio Abad of the Liberal Party (later became part of Koalisyong Pambansa) was appointed as Secretary of Agrarian Reform on December 12, 1989.

Koalisyong Pambansa nominated Antonio Escalante, who was defeated by Enrique Lizardo of Laban ng Demokratikong Pilipino.

Candidate	Party	Votes	%
Enrique Lizardo	Laban ng Demokratikong Pilipino	3,358	58.87
Fernando Faberes	Nationalist People's Coalition	1,453	25.47
Antonio Escalante	Koalisyong Pambansa	893	15.66
Total		5,704	100.00
Source: Commission on Elections

== Batangas ==
=== Batangas' 1st district ===
Incumbent Conrado Apacible of Laban ng Demokratikong Pilipino ran for a second term, but was defeated by Eduardo Ermita of Lakas–NUCD.

Candidate	Party	Votes	%
Eduardo Ermita	Lakas–NUCD	43,120	31.94
Roberto Cabrera	Nacionalista Party	33,574	24.87
Conrado Apacible (incumbent)	Laban ng Demokratikong Pilipino	31,736	23.51
Hermogenes de Castro Jr.	Independent	22,815	16.90
Rolando Suarez	Laban ng Demokratikong Pilipino	3,752	2.78
Total		134,997	100.00
Source: Commission on Elections

=== Batangas' 2nd district ===
Incumbent Hernando Perez of Laban ng Demokratikong Pilipino was re-elected to a second term.

Candidate	Party	Votes	%
Hernando Perez (incumbent)	Laban ng Demokratikong Pilipino	76,692	58.09
Jose Atienza	Nacionalista Party	55,329	41.91
Total		132,021	100.00
Source: Commission on Elections

=== Batangas' 3rd district ===
Incumbent Milagros Trinidad of the Nacionalista Party was re-elected to a second term.

Candidate	Party	Votes	%
Milagros Trinidad (incumbent)	Nacionalista Party	71,532	62.16
Dante Carandang	Laban ng Demokratikong Pilipino	43,539	37.84
Total		115,071	100.00
Source: Commission on Elections

=== Batangas' 4th district ===
Incumbent Jose Calingasan of Lakas–NUCD retired. Lakas–NUCD nominated Nicetas Katigbak, who was defeated by Ralph Recto of the Nacionalista Party.

Candidate	Party	Votes	%
Ralph Recto	Nacionalista Party	39,224	27.17
Antonio Lacdao	Laban ng Demokratikong Pilipino	36,892	25.56
Nicetas Katigbak	Lakas–NUCD	30,367	21.04
Crisanto Gualberto	Nationalist People's Coalition	30,186	20.91
Efren Mercado	Koalisyong Pambansa	7,672	5.32
Total		144,341	100.00
Source: Commission on Elections

== Benguet ==
Incumbent Samuel Dangwa of Laban ng Demokratikong Pilipino was re-elected to a second term.

Candidate	Party	Votes	%
Samuel Dangwa (incumbent)	Laban ng Demokratikong Pilipino	47,309	50.36
Raul Molintas	NPC/Nacionalista/KBL	46,432	49.42
Bedis Guznian	Independent	206	0.22
Total		93,947	100.00
Source: Commission on Elections

== Bohol ==
=== Bohol's 1st district ===
Incumbent Venice Agana of Lakas–NUCD was re-elected to a second term.

Candidate	Party	Votes	%
Venice Agana (incumbent)	Lakas–NUCD	47,684	43.92
Julius Caesar Herrera	Laban ng Demokratikong Pilipino	32,387	29.83
Jacinto Rubillar Jr.	Nacionalista/NPC	20,743	19.11
Felix Rengel	Koalisyong Pambansa	4,143	3.82
Fortunato Garay	Koalisyong Pambansa	1,343	1.24
Cesar Ceballos	Independent	1,083	1.00
Fefelino Cortico	Independent	608	0.56
Samuel Arcamo	Kilusang Bagong Lipunan	573	0.53
Total		108,564	100.00
Source: Commission on Elections

=== Bohol's 2nd district ===
Incumbent David Tirol of the Nationalist People's Coalition (NPC) ran for Governor of Bohol. The NPC, in coalition with the Nacionalista Party, nominated Erico Aumentado, who won the election.

Candidate	Party	Votes	%
Erico Aumentado	Nacionalista/NPC	32,924	45.36
Prudencio Garcia	Laban ng Demokratikong Pilipino	19,034	26.22
Francisco Alesna Jr.	Lakas–NUCD	14,281	19.67
Antonio Ceniza	Nacionalista Party	5,223	7.20
Rafael Besas	Kilusang Bagong Lipunan	516	0.71
Eliezer Nunez	Kilusang Bagong Lipunan	347	0.48
Benigno Torrejos Jr.	Independent	260	0.36
Total		72,585	100.00
Source: Commission on Elections

=== Bohol's 3rd district ===
Incumbent Isidro Zarraga of Laban ng Demokratikong Pilipino was re-elected to a second term.

Candidate	Party	Votes	%
Isidro Zarraga (incumbent)	Laban ng Demokratikong Pilipino	46,706	44.21
Dionisio Balite	Nationalist People's Coalition	29,772	28.18
Alexander Lim	Laban ng Demokratikong Pilipino	25,939	24.55
Violeta Abasolo	Lakas–NUCD	1,775	1.68
Cipriano Bernido	Kilusang Bagong Lipunan	1,460	1.38
Total		105,652	100.00
Source: Commission on Elections

== Bukidnon ==
=== Bukidnon's 1st district ===
Incumbent Socorro Acosta of Koalisyong Pambansa was re-elected to a second term.

Candidate	Party	Votes	%
Socorro Acosta (incumbent)	Koalisyong Pambansa	26,258	42.88
Norman Tugot	Nationalist People's Coalition	20,258	33.08
Angel Baula	Laban ng Demokratikong Pilipino	11,630	18.99
Valentin Albarece	Lakas–NUCD	2,673	4.37
Cipriano Lupeba	Kilusang Bagong Lipunan	415	0.68
Total		61,234	100.00
Source: Commission on Elections

=== Bukidnon's 2nd district ===
Incumbent Violeta Labaria of Laban ng Demokratikong Pilipino ran for a second term, but was defeated by Reginaldo Tilanduca of the Nationalist People's Coalition.

Candidate	Party	Votes	%
Reginaldo Tilanduca	Nationalist People's Coalition	22,577	26.25
Vicente Polinar	Kilusang Bagong Lipunan	21,801	25.35
Eliezer Mabao	Lakas–NUCD	17,160	19.95
Violeta Labaria (incumbent)	Laban ng Demokratikong Pilipino	10,165	11.82
Manuel Cabrera	Lakas–NUCD	7,497	8.72
Israel Damasco	Nacionalista Party	2,109	2.45
Godwin Valdez	Lakas–NUCD	2,042	2.37
Felicisimo Tenerio Jr.	Nacionalista Party	1,361	1.58
Vigilio Pacana	Kilusang Bagong Lipunan	816	0.95
Felicitas Romualdez	Lakas–NUCD/PCP	368	0.43
Leony Ludy Pacaldo	Kilusang Bagong Lipunan	80	0.09
Benjamin Belisario	Kilusang Bagong Lipunan	38	0.04
Total		86,014	100.00
Source: Commission on Elections

=== Bukidnon's 3rd district ===
Incumbent Jose Maria Zubiri Jr. of the Nationalist People's Coalition was re-elected to a second term.

Candidate	Party	Votes	%
Jose Maria Zubiri Jr. (incumbent)	Nationalist People's Coalition	67,346	74.99
Roberto Montalban	Laban ng Demokratikong Pilipino	21,696	24.16
Elpidio Aranggo	Kilusang Bagong Lipunan	590	0.66
Rolando Waban	Kilusang Bagong Lipunan	100	0.11
Luis Dongallo Sr.	Koalisyong Pambansa	76	0.08
Total		89,808	100.00
Source: Commission on Elections

== Bulacan ==
=== Bulacan's 1st district ===
Incumbent Francisco Aniag Jr. of Laban ng Demokratikong Pilipino ran for a second term, but was defeated by Teodulo Natividad of Lakas–NUCD.

Candidate	Party	Votes	%
Teodulo Natividad	Lakas–NUCD	80,071	54.08
Francisco Aniag Jr. (incumbent)	Laban ng Demokratikong Pilipino	38,297	25.87
Magdalena Reyes	Koalisyong Pambansa	25,194	17.02
Adelino Ramos	Pwersa ng Masang Pilipino	3,087	2.09
Jose Lombos	Independent	1,224	0.83
Mario Cruz	Kilusang Bagong Lipunan	112	0.08
Manuel Feliciano	Independent	25	0.02
Raymundo Gatchalian	Kilusang Bagong Lipunan	23	0.02
Roberto Guzman Jr.	Independent	19	0.01
Total		148,052	100.00
Source: Commission on Elections

=== Bulacan's 2nd district ===
Incumbent Vicente Rivera Jr. of the Nationalist People's Coalition (NPC) ran for the Senate. The NPC nominated Pedro Pancho, who won the election.

Candidate	Party	Votes	%
Pedro Pancho	Nationalist People's Coalition	63,084	46.60
Genaro Reyes	Laban ng Demokratikong Pilipino	24,209	17.88
Pedro Principe	Koalisyong Pambansa	19,194	14.18
Felimon Mangahas	Lakas–NUCD	13,398	9.90
Geronimo Veneracion	PRP/Nacionalista	12,874	9.51
Demetrio Alday	Kilusang Bagong Lipunan	2,518	1.86
Dionisio Perez	Kilusang Bagong Lipunan	109	0.08
Total		135,386	100.00
Source: Commission on Elections

=== Bulacan's 3rd district ===
Incumbent Jose Cabochan of Lakas–NUCD ran for a second term, but was defeated by Ricardo Silverio of Laban ng Demokratikong Pilipino.

Candidate	Party	Votes	%
Ricardo Silverio	Laban ng Demokratikong Pilipino	41,205	39.84
Jose Cabochan (incumbent)	Lakas–NUCD	35,101	33.94
Joey Munsayac	Koalisyong Pambansa	13,545	13.10
Roberto Sombillo	Nacionalista/KBL	7,502	7.25
Constante Agbayani	NPC/Nacionalista/KBL	4,709	4.55
Rosalino Barican	Farmers Party of the Philippines	914	0.88
Ciriaco Macapagal	Kilusang Bagong Lipunan	441	0.43
Total		103,417	100.00
Source: Commission on Elections

=== Bulacan's 4th district ===
The seat was vacant after Rogaciano Mercado of Laban ng Demokratikong Pilipino (LDP) died on November 13, 1989.

The LDP nominated Florentino Blanco, who was defeated by Angelito Sarmiento of Lakas–NUCD.

Candidate	Party	Votes	%
Angelito Sarmiento	Lakas–NUCD	53,252	36.01
Florentino Blanco	Laban ng Demokratikong Pilipino	49,910	33.75
Jesus Salvador Rodriguez	Nationalist People's Coalition	24,384	16.49
Jesus Santos	Koalisyong Pambansa	13,966	9.44
Gregorio Licaros	Independent	5,996	4.05
Miguel Ricamora	Nacionalista Party	386	0.26
Total		147,894	100.00
Source: Commission on Elections

== Cagayan ==
=== Cagayan's 1st district ===
Incumbent Domingo Tuzon of Lakas–NUCD ran for a second term, but was defeated by senator Juan Ponce Enrile of the Nacionalista Party.

Candidate	Party	Votes	%
Juan Ponce Enrile	Nacionalista Party	55,555	58.73
Victor Padilla	NPC/PMP	26,851	28.39
Domingo Tuzon (incumbent)	Lakas–NUCD	12,087	12.78
Gregorio Co Jr.	Independent	101	0.11
Total		94,594	100.00
Source: Commission on Elections

=== Cagayan's 2nd district ===
Incumbent Leoncio Puzon of Laban ng Demokratikong Pilipino ran for a second term, but was defeated by Edgar Lara of the Nationalist People's Coalition.

Candidate	Party	Votes	%
Edgar Lara	Nationalist People's Coalition	24,314	38.10
Cesar Agner	None	13,963	21.88
Melvin Vargas	Lakas–NUCD/UMDP	13,594	21.30
Leoncio Puzon (incumbent)	Laban ng Demokratikong Pilipino	11,943	18.72
Total		63,814	100.00
Source: Commission on Elections

=== Cagayan's 3rd district ===
The seat was vacant after Tito Dupaya of Laban ng Demokratikong Pilipino (LDP) died on April 1, 1989. The LDP, in coalition with the Nacionalista Party, nominated Randolph Ting, who was defeated by Francisco Mamba of Lakas–NUCD.

Candidate	Party	Votes	%
Francisco Mamba	Lakas–NUCD	24,840	26.64
Geronimo Reyes Jr.	Independent	24,080	25.83
Randolph Ting	Nacionalista/LDP	18,787	20.15
Alfonso Reyno Jr.	Independent	18,373	19.71
Orlando Molina	Koalisyong Pambansa	5,312	5.70
V Agustin Agustin	Koalisyong Pambansa	1,021	1.10
Benjamin Ligot	Nationalist People's Coalition	801	0.86
Oscar Baggayan	People's Reform Party	25	0.03
Total		93,239	100.00
Source: Commission on Elections

== Cagayan de Oro ==
Incumbent Benedicta Roa of Laban ng Demokratikong Pilipino (LDP) retired. The LDP nominated Rogelio Bagabuyo, who was defeated by Erasmo Damasing of Koalisyong Pambansa.

Candidate	Party	Votes	%
Erasmo Damasing	Koalisyong Pambansa	63,366	57.57
Henry Bacal	Nationalist People's Coalition	23,731	21.56
Dulcisimo Ytem	Lakas–NUCD/UMDP	10,753	9.77
Rogelio Bagabuyo	Laban ng Demokratikong Pilipino	7,780	7.07
Epimaco Densing Jr.	Kilusang Bagong Lipunan	2,376	2.16
Pantaleon Salcedo	Kilusang Bagong Lipunan	1,892	1.72
Augusto Guitarte Sr.	Lakas–NUCD/PCP	177	0.16
Total		110,075	100.00
Source: Commission on Elections

== Caloocan ==
=== Caloocan's 1st district ===
Incumbent Romeo Santos of Laban ng Demokratikong Pilipino ran for a second term, but was defeated by Aurora Henson, an independent who is also affiliated with Liping Kalookan.

Candidate	Party	Votes	%
Aurora Henson	Liping Kalookan/Independent	26,586	
Rosario Bautista	Nacionalista Party		
Catalino Casi	Independent		
Epraim Defino	Independent		
Recom Echiverri	Lakas–NUCD		
Bobby Guanzon	Koalisyong Pambansa		
Norma Nueva	Lakas–NUCD		
Augusto Pena Jr.	Independent		
Cipriano Roma	KBL/Independent		
Agripino Samonte	Partido ng Masang Pilipino		
Romeo Santos (incumbent)	Laban ng Demokratikong Pilipino		
Total			
Source: Commission on Elections

=== Caloocan's 2nd district ===
Incumbent Gerardo P. Cabochan of Koalisyong Pambansa retired. Luis Asistio, an independent, won the election.

Candidate	Party	Votes	%
Luis Asistio	Independent	44,024	
Roberto Cordero	Laban ng Demokratikong Pilipino		
Jacob Kliatchko	Lakas–NUCD		
Eduardo Magtoto	People's Reform Party		
Mamerto Manahan	Lakas–NUCD		
Anastacio Tujan	Independent		
Total			
Source: Commission on Elections

== Camarines Norte ==
Incumbent Renato Unico of Laban ng Demokratikong Pilipino ran for a second term, but was defeated by Emmanuel Pimentel of the Nationalist People's Coalition.

Candidate	Party	Votes	%
Emmanuel Pimentel	Nationalist People's Coalition	40,553	34.60
Renato Unico (incumbent)	Laban ng Demokratikong Pilipino	36,482	31.13
Serafin Rivera	Koalisyong Pambansa	25,983	22.17
Mario Villafuerte Sr.	Lakas–NUCD	6,637	5.66
Jose Atienza	Kilusang Bagong Lipunan	5,562	4.75
Donald Asis	Koalisyong Pambansa	1,981	1.69
Total		117,198	100.00
Source: Commission on Elections

== Camarines Sur ==
=== Camarines Sur's 1st district ===
Incumbent Rolando Andaya of Lakas–NUCD was re-elected to a second term.

Candidate	Party	Votes	%
Rolando Andaya (incumbent)	Lakas–NUCD	68,164	78.19
Leovegildo Basmayor	Laban ng Demokratikong Pilipino	19,016	21.81
Total		87,180	100.00
Source: Commission on Elections

=== Camarines Sur's 2nd district ===
Incumbent Raul Roco of Laban ng Demokratikong Pilipino (LDP) ran for the Senate. The LDP nominated Alfredo Tria, who was defeated by Celso Baguio of Partido ng Masang Pilipino.

Candidate	Party	Votes	%
Celso Baguio	Partido ng Masang Pilipino	40,083	36.94
Leopoldo San Buenaventura	Koalisyong Pambansa	36,039	33.21
Alfredo Tria	Laban ng Demokratikong Pilipino	9,007	8.30
Carlos del Castillo	Nacionalista/NPC	8,445	7.78
Vicente Sibulo	Lakas–NUCD	7,319	6.74
Efren Santos	Lakas–NUCD	4,852	4.47
Maico Julia	Nacionalista Party	1,940	1.79
Cynthia Penalosa	Kilusang Bagong Lipunan	775	0.71
Glinton Ervas	Independent	53	0.05
Total		108,513	100.00
Source: Commission on Elections

=== Camarines Sur's 3rd district ===
Incumbent Eduardo Pilapil of Lakas–NUCD ran for the Senate. Lakas–NUCD nominated Alfredo Rellora, who was defeated by Arnulfo Fuentebella of the Nacionalista Party and the Nationalist People's Coalition.

Candidate	Party	Votes	%
Arnulfo Fuentebella	Nacionalista/NPC	26,394	36.58
Amador Simando	Laban ng Demokratikong Pilipino	25,346	35.13
Alfredo Rellora	Lakas–NUCD	15,274	21.17
Miguel Oraa	Koalisyong Pambansa	5,142	7.13
Total		72,156	100.00
Source: Commission on Elections

=== Camarines Sur's 4th district ===
Incumbent Ciriaco Alfelor of Koalisyong Pambansa was re-elected to a second term.

Candidate	Party	Votes	%
Ciriaco Alfelor (incumbent)	Koalisyong Pambansa	44,535	49.37
Honorato Colico	Laban ng Demokratikong Pilipino	27,956	30.99
Jose Nepomuceno	Nacionalista/NPC	14,605	16.19
Mariano Trinidad	Partido ng Masang Pilipino	3,114	3.45
Total		90,210	100.00
Source: Commission on Elections

== Camiguin ==
Incumbent Pedro Romualdo of Laban ng Demokratikong Pilipino was re-elected to a second term.

Candidate	Party	Votes	%
Pedro Romualdo (incumbent)	Laban ng Demokratikong Pilipino	13,563	51.12
Nicolas Neri	Lakas–NUCD/KBL	12,886	48.57
Faustino Neri Jr.	Kilusang Bagong Lipunan	81	0.31
Total		26,530	100.00
Source: Commission on Elections

== Capiz ==
=== Capiz' 1st district ===
Incumbent Gerardo Roxas Jr. was re-elected to a second term as the candidate of Koalisyong Pambansa, Lakas–NUCD and the Nacionalista Party.

Candidate	Party	Votes	%
Gerardo Roxas Jr. (incumbent)	Koalisyong Pambansa/Lakas–CMD/Nacionalista	79,834	76.44
Gerardo Arcenas	Nationalist People's Coalition	19,013	18.20
Noede Villareal	Laban ng Demokratikong Pilipino	5,597	5.36
Total		104,444	100.00
Source: Commission on Elections

=== Capiz' 2nd district ===
Incumbent Cornelio Villareal of Koalisyong Pambansa retired. The Koalisyong Pambansa, in coalition with Lakas–NUCD, nominated Vicente Andaya Jr., who won the election.

Candidate	Party	Votes	%
Vicente Andaya Jr.	Lakas–NUCD/Koalisyong Pambansa	45,288	51.96
Gabriel Villareal	Nationalist People's Coalition	39,691	45.54
Nelson Apsay	Independent	1,774	2.04
Rolando Bayon	Kilusang Bagong Lipunan	389	0.45
Manuel Supetran	Independent	18	0.02
Total		87,160	100.00
Source: Commission on Elections

== Catanduanes ==
The seat was vacant after Moises Tapia, an independent, died on November 15, 1987. Leandro Verceles Jr. of Lakas–NUCD won the election.

Candidate	Party	Votes	%
Leandro Verceles Jr.	Lakas–NUCD	16,410	26.31
Armando Lizaso	Laban ng Demokratikong Pilipino	14,344	23.00
Amador Teston	Independent/NPC	10,026	16.08
Benjamin Talan	Nationalist People's Coalition	9,767	15.66
Calvin Arcilla	Koalisyong Pambansa	7,182	11.52
Apolonio Reyes	CRP	2,274	3.65
Edmundo Alberto	Independent	1,144	1.83
Merito Fernandez	Nacionalista/KBL	574	0.92
Luis Sorreta	Nacionalista Party	444	0.71
Justo Evangelista	Kilusang Bagong Lipunan	110	0.18
Horacio Villarete	Independent	86	0.14
Total		62,361	100.00
Source: Commission on Elections

== Cavite ==
=== Cavite's 1st district ===
Incumbent Leonardo Guerrero of Laban ng Demokratikong Pilipino (LDP) retired. The LDP nominated Plaridel Abaya, who was defeated by Dominador Nazareno Jr. of the Nationalist People's Coalition.

Candidate	Party	Votes	%
Dominador Nazareno Jr.	Nationalist People's Coalition	54,058	41.58
Plaridel Abaya	Laban ng Demokratikong Pilipino	43,401	33.38
Jessie Castillo	Lakas–NUCD	32,553	25.04
Total		130,012	100.00
Source: Commission on Elections

=== Cavite's 2nd district ===
Incumbent Renato Dragon won re-election to a second term as the candidate of Laban ng Demokratikong Pilipino and Partido Magdalo.

Candidate	Party	Votes	%
Renato Dragon (incumbent)	LDP/Magdalo	100,815	63.50
Franco Loyola	Lakas–NUCD	36,335	22.89
Asisclo Castaneda	Nationalist People's Coalition	21,609	13.61
Total		158,759	100.00
Source: Commission on Elections

=== Cavite's 3rd district ===
Incumbent Jorge Nuñez of Laban ng Demokratikong Pilipino (LDP) retired. The LDP, in coalition with Partido Magdalo, nominated Telesforo Unas, who won the election.

Candidate	Party	Votes	%
Telesforo Unas	LDP/Magdalo	63,204	65.80
Ernesto Perez	Lakas–NUCD	28,126	29.28
Reynaldo Maraan	Koalisyong Pambansa	3,295	3.43
Vivencio Causaren	Independent	1,430	1.49
Total		96,055	100.00
Source: Commission on Elections

== Cebu ==
=== Cebu's 1st district ===
Incumbent Antonio Bacaltos of Lakas–NUCD ran for a second term, but was defeated by Eduardo Gullas of the Nationalist People's Coalition.

Candidate	Party	Votes	%
Eduardo Gullas	Nationalist People's Coalition	68,269	60.84
Antonio Bacaltos (incumbent)	Lakas–NUCD	37,751	33.64
Milagros Cavan	Laban ng Demokratikong Pilipino	6,172	5.50
Suennung Hegna	Emancipated Scientists Party	25	0.02
Total		112,217	100.00
Source: Commission on Elections

=== Cebu's 2nd district ===
Incumbent Crisologo Abines of Laban ng Demokratikong Pilipino was re-elected to a second term.

Candidate	Party	Votes	%
Crisologo Abines (incumbent)	Laban ng Demokratikong Pilipino	58,251	51.44
Galileo Kintanar	Lakas–NUCD	54,339	47.99
Norman Santos	Kilusang Bagong Lipunan	641	0.57
Total		113,231	100.00
Source: Commission on Elections

=== Cebu's 3rd district ===
Incumbent Pablo P. Garcia of Lakas–NUCD was re-elected to a second term.

Candidate	Party	Votes	%
Pablo P. Garcia (incumbent)	Lakas–NUCD	57,902	61.29
Walter Selma	Nationalist People's Coalition	20,618	21.83
Celestino Sybico Sr.	Laban ng Demokratikong Pilipino	15,102	15.99
Elmera Rafols	Koalisyong Pambansa	847	0.90
Total		94,469	100.00
Source: Commission on Elections

=== Cebu's 4th district ===
Incumbent Celestino Martinez Jr. of Laban ng Demokratikong Pilipino was re-elected to a second term.

Candidate	Party	Votes	%
Celestino Martinez Jr. (incumbent)	Laban ng Demokratikong Pilipino	66,834	68.22
Roberto Ybañez	Lakas–NUCD	29,976	30.60
Jesusa Book	Kilusang Bagong Lipunan	1,156	1.18
Total		97,966	100.00
Source: Commission on Elections

=== Cebu's 5th district ===
Incumbent Ramon Durano III of Laban ng Demokratikong Pilipino was re-elected to a second term.

Candidate	Party	Votes	%
Ramon Durano III (incumbent)	Laban ng Demokratikong Pilipino	88,463	81.69
Felipe Tionko	Lakas–NUCD	14,642	13.52
Gilbert Wagas	Kilusang Bagong Lipunan	5,181	4.78
Total		108,286	100.00
Source: Commission on Elections

=== Cebu's 6th district ===
Incumbent Vicente dela Serna of Laban ng Demokratikong Pilipino (LDP) ran for Governor of Cebu. The LDP nominated Joseph Adonis Baquel, who was defeated by Nerissa Soon-Ruiz of the Nationalist People's Coalition.

Candidate	Party	Votes	%
Nerissa Soon-Ruiz	Nationalist People's Coalition	47,056	38.47
Serge Osmeña	Lakas–NUCD	40,860	33.40
Joseph Adonis Baquel	Laban ng Demokratikong Pilipino	28,403	23.22
Lanivo Osorio	Nacionalista Party	3,288	2.69
Vito Minoria	Kilusang Bagong Lipunan	1,644	1.34
Corsino Soco	Kilusang Bagong Lipunan	1,081	0.88
Total		122,332	100.00
Source: Commission on Elections

== Cebu City ==
=== Cebu City's 1st district ===
Incumbent Raul del Mar of Partido Panaghiusa was re-elected to a second term.

Candidate	Party	Votes	%
Raul del Mar (incumbent)	Partido Panaghiusa	70,960	60.10
Cerge Remonde	Laban ng Demokratikong Pilipino	23,319	19.75
Avenescio Piñamide	Nationalist People's Coalition	23,270	19.71
Saturnino del Mar	KBL/Lakas–NUCD	311	0.26
Jude Thadeo Famor	KBL/Independent	207	0.18
Total		118,067	100.00
Source: Commission on Elections

=== Cebu City's 2nd district ===
Incumbent Antonio Cuenco of Laban ng Demokratikong Pilipino was re-elected to a second term.

Candidate	Party	Votes	%
Antonio Cuenco (incumbent)	Laban ng Demokratikong Pilipino	87,260	87.32
Rey Estanislao Crystal	Nationalist People's Coalition	11,198	11.21
Loreto Ong	Kilusang Bagong Lipunan	728	0.73
Virgilio Abadilla	Independent	328	0.33
Aniano Bautista	People's Reform Party	225	0.23
Alejandro Suarez	None	190	0.19
Total		99,929	100.00
Source: Commission on Elections

== Cotabato ==
=== Cotabato's 1st district ===
Incumbent Rodrigo Gutang of Laban ng Demokratikong Pilipino (LDP) ran for the Senate. The LDP nominated Tito Gallo, who was defeated by Anthony Dequiña, the candidate of the Nationalist People's Coalition, the Nacionalista Party and the Grand Alliance for Democracy.

Candidate	Party	Votes	%
Anthony Dequiña	NPC/Nacionalista/GAD	26,057	25.79
Tito Gallo	Laban ng Demokratikong Pilipino	21,062	20.84
Jesus Sacdalan	Lakas–NUCD	17,789	17.60
Midpantao Adil	Lakas–NUCD/IPP	15,572	15.41
Jesus Amparo	Kilusang Bagong Lipunan	11,934	11.81
Littie Sarah Agdeppa	Nacionalista Party	6,988	6.92
Bobby Tandual	Farmers Party of the Philippines	982	0.97
Romulo Ferran	Independent	585	0.58
Antonio Cabanog	Independent	85	0.08
Total		101,054	100.00
Source: Commission on Elections

=== Cotabato's 2nd district ===
Incumbent Gregorio Andolana of Laban ng Demokratikong Pilipino was re-elected to a second term.

Candidate	Party	Votes	%
Gregorio Andolana (incumbent)	Laban ng Demokratikong Pilipino	53,504	54.58
Gaudioso Villasor Jr.	Nacionalista/NPC/KBL	22,425	22.88
Freddie Baynosa	Laban ng Demokratikong Pilipino	21,831	22.27
Everito Gonzales	People's Reform Party	206	0.21
Manuel Gadi	Independent	63	0.06
Total		98,029	100.00
Source: Commission on Elections

== Davao City ==
=== Davao City's 1st district ===
Incumbent Prospero Nograles of Laban ng Demokratikong Pilipino (LDP) retired to run for Mayor of Davao City. The LDP nominated Dominador Zuño Jr., who was defeated by Jesus Dureza of the Nationalist People's Coalition.

Candidate	Party	Votes	%
Jesus Dureza	Nationalist People's Coalition	62,436	51.52
Dominador Zuño Jr.	Laban ng Demokratikong Pilipino	38,391	31.68
Reynaldo Teves	Koalisyong Pambansa	20,360	16.80
Total		121,187	100.00
Source: Commission on Elections

=== Davao City's 2nd district ===
Incumbent Cornelio Maskariño of Koalisyong Pambansa ran for a second term, but was defeated by Manuel Garcia of the Nationalist People's Coalition.

Candidate	Party	Votes	%
Manuel Garcia	Nationalist People's Coalition	31,710	37.04
Senforiano Alferado	Lakas–NUCD/UMDP	30,415	35.53
Liborio Lumain	Laban ng Demokratikong Pilipino	12,149	14.19
Cornelio Maskariño (incumbent)	Koalisyong Pambansa	7,855	9.18
Arnel Dayanghirang	Kilusang Bagong Lipunan	2,295	2.68
Conrado Macasa Sr.	None	1,120	1.31
Nazir Ahmad Abbas	Independent	59	0.07
Total		85,603	100.00
Source: Commission on Elections

=== Davao City's 3rd district ===
The seat was vacant after Luis Santos of Lakas ng Bansa resigned on October 27, 1987, upon being appointed as Secretary of Local Government. Elias Lopez of the Nationalist People's Coalition won the election.

Candidate	Party	Votes	%
Elias Lopez	Nationalist People's Coalition	29,904	38.83
Mariano Santos	Laban ng Demokratikong Pilipino	16,878	21.92
Sonja Rodriguez	Lakas–NUCD	15,488	20.11
Victorio Advincula	None	8,524	11.07
Ruben Robillo	Independent	6,135	7.97
Gaudencio Kintanar	Independent	82	0.11
Total		77,011	100.00
Source: Commission on Elections

== Davao del Norte ==
=== Davao del Norte's 1st district ===
Incumbent Lorenzo Sarmiento of Laban ng Demokratikong Pilipino (LDP) retired. The LDP nominated Sarmiento's son, Rogelio Sarmiento, who won the election.

Candidate	Party	Votes	%
Rogelio Sarmiento	Laban ng Demokratikong Pilipino	52,170	61.02
Rodolfo Rapista	Lakas–NUCD/UMDP	31,204	36.50
Cesar Mancao	Kilusang Bagong Lipunan	1,320	1.54
Baltazar Bacaron	Kilusang Bagong Lipunan	565	0.66
Nithler Varona	Koalisyong Pambansa	237	0.28
Total		85,496	100.00
Source: Commission on Elections

=== Davao del Norte's 2nd district ===
Incumbent Baltazar Sator of Laban ng Demokratikong Pilipino was re-elected to a second term.

Candidate	Party	Votes	%
Baltazar Sator (incumbent)	Laban ng Demokratikong Pilipino	40,824	32.42
Jose Caballero	Nationalist People's Coalition	37,758	29.99
Pantaleon Alvarez	Lakas–NUCD	17,045	13.54
Crisanto Maniwang	People's Reform Party	16,582	13.17
Filomeno Balinas	Koalisyong Pambansa	8,297	6.59
Cesar Cuntapay	Kilusang Bagong Lipunan	4,667	3.71
Valeriano Pintor	Nacionalista Party	731	0.58
Total		125,904	100.00
Source: Commission on Elections

=== Davao del Norte's 3rd district ===
Incumbent Rodolfo del Rosario of Laban ng Demokratikong Pilipino was re-elected to a second term unopposed.

Candidate	Party	Votes	%
Rodolfo del Rosario (incumbent)	Laban ng Demokratikong Pilipino	75,637	100.00
Total		75,637	100.00
Source: Commission on Elections

== Davao del Sur ==
=== Davao del Sur's 1st district ===
Incumbent Juanito Camasura Jr. of the Nationalist People's Coalition ran for a second term, but was defeated by Alejandro Almendras of Lakas–NUCD.

Candidate	Party	Votes	%
Alejandro Almendras	Lakas–NUCD	46,576	45.87
Josefina Almazan	Laban ng Demokratikong Pilipino	32,744	32.25
Juanito Camasura Jr. (incumbent)	Nationalist People's Coalition	21,114	20.79
Antonio Kinoc	Kilusang Bagong Lipunan	1,107	1.09
Total		101,541	100.00
Source: Commission on Elections

=== Davao del Sur's 2nd district ===
Incumbent Benjamin Bautista Sr. was re-elected to a second term as the candidate of the Nationalist People's Coalition, the Nacionalista Party and Kilusang Bagong Lipunan.

Candidate	Party	Votes	%
Benjamin Bautista Sr. (incumbent)	NPC/Nacionalista/KBL	29,231	41.54
Dominador Carrillo	Laban ng Demokratikong Pilipino	17,412	24.74
Randolph Parcasio	Koalisyong Pambansa/Lakas–NUCD	13,347	18.97
Rodolfo Quiachon	Koalisyong Pambansa	6,775	9.63
Pedro Ocampo	Kilusang Bagong Lipunan	3,606	5.12
Total		70,371	100.00
Source: Commission on Elections

== Davao Oriental ==
=== Davao Oriental's 1st district ===
Incumbent Enrico Dayanghirang of Koalisyong Pambansa ran for a second term, but was defeated by Ma. Elena Palma Gil of Laban ng Demokratikong Pilipino.

Candidate	Party	Votes	%
Ma. Elena Palma Gil	Laban ng Demokratikong Pilipino	14,331	36.79
Edith Rabat	Nationalist People's Coalition	9,723	24.96
Enrico Dayanghirang (incumbent)	Koalisyong Pambansa	9,676	24.84
Milagros Iturrable	Lakas–NUCD	4,913	12.61
Nicomedes Basco Sr.	Kilusang Bagong Lipunan	182	0.47
Jose Estrada	Independent	125	0.32
Total		38,950	100.00
Source: Commission on Elections

=== Davao Oriental's 2nd district ===
Incumbent Thelma Almario of Laban ng Demokratikong Pilipino was re-elected to a second term.

Candidate	Party	Votes	%
Thelma Almario (incumbent)	Laban ng Demokratikong Pilipino	43,806	70.77
Gervacio Valenteros Jr.	Nationalist People's Coalition	11,051	17.85
Gil Taojo Jr.	Partido ng Masang Pilipino	3,667	5.92
Antonio Olmedo	Lakas–NUCD	2,079	3.36
Cesario Mabini	Kilusang Bagong Lipunan	880	1.42
Manuel Santos Jr.	Koalisyong Pambansa	419	0.68
Total		61,902	100.00
Source: Commission on Elections

== Eastern Samar ==
Incumbent Jose Ramirez of Lakas–NUCD was re-elected to a second term.

Candidate	Party	Votes	%
Jose Ramirez (incumbent)	Lakas–NUCD	34,133	41.37
Casiano Flores	Koalisyong Pambansa	20,086	24.34
Rufino Tan	Laban ng Demokratikong Pilipino	17,189	20.83
Ireneo Torres	Nacionalista Party	11,015	13.35
Juan Bocas	KBL/Kusog	86	0.10
Total		82,509	100.00
Source: Commission on Elections

== Ifugao ==
Incumbent Gualberto Lumawig of Lakas–NUCD ran for a second term, but was defeated by Benjamin Cappleman of Laban ng Demokratikong Pilipino.

Candidate	Party	Votes	%
Benjamin Cappleman	Laban ng Demokratikong Pilipino	18,065	41.89
Gualberto Lumawig (incumbent)	Lakas–NUCD	13,229	30.68
Denis Habawel	Koalisyong Pambansa	11,832	27.44
Total		43,126	100.00
Source: Commission on Elections

== Ilocos Norte ==
=== Ilocos Norte's 1st district ===
Incumbent Roque Ablan Jr. of Kilusang Bagong Lipunan was re-elected to a second term.

Candidate	Party	Votes	%
Roque Ablan Jr. (incumbent)	Kilusang Bagong Lipunan	48,546	54.31
Lita Marcos	NPC/KBL	21,641	24.21
Victor Aguilar	Laban ng Demokratikong Pilipino	13,516	15.12
Alfonso Ruiz	Lakas–NUCD	5,637	6.31
Samson Blankas Jr.	Independent	50	0.06
Total		89,390	100.00
Source: Commission on Elections

=== Ilocos Norte's 2nd district ===
Incumbent Mariano Nalupta Jr. ran for Vice Governor of Ilocos Norte as an independent.

Bongbong Marcos of Kilusang Bagong Lipunan won the election.

Candidate	Party	Votes	%
Bongbong Marcos	Kilusang Bagong Lipunan	76,605	91.10
Emerito Salva	Lakas–NUCD	7,451	8.86
Geronimo Mangaban	Koalisyong Pambansa	30	0.04
Total		84,086	100.00
Source: Commission on Elections

== Ilocos Sur ==
=== Ilocos Sur's 1st district ===
Incumbent Chavit Singson of Laban ng Demokratikong Pilipino (LDP) ran for Governor of Ilocos Sur. The LDP nominated Mariano Tajon, who won the election.

Candidate	Party	Votes	%
Mariano Tajon	Laban ng Demokratikong Pilipino	36,692	44.09
Benjamin Baterina	Lakas–NUCD	31,136	37.42
Ma. Livia de Leon	Independent	15,302	18.39
Floralee de Leon	Lakas–NUCD	82	0.10
Total		83,212	100.00
Source: Commission on Elections

=== Ilocos Sur's 2nd district ===
Incumbent Eric Singson of Laban ng Demokratikong Pilipino was re-elected to a second term.

Candidate	Party	Votes	%
Eric Singson (incumbent)	Laban ng Demokratikong Pilipino	83,151	79.33
Candido Balbin Jr.	Independent	21,535	20.54
Ernesto Antolin	Independent	136	0.13
Total		104,822	100.00
Source: Commission on Elections

== Iloilo ==
=== Iloilo's 1st district ===
Incumbent Oscar Garin of Lakas–NUCD was re-elected to a second term.

Candidate	Party	Votes	%
Oscar Garin (incumbent)	Lakas–NUCD	68,233	66.85
Salvador Britanico	Ilongos	33,830	33.15
Total		102,063	100.00
Source: Commission on Elections

=== Iloilo's 2nd district ===
Incumbent Alberto Lopez of Lakas–NUCD was re-elected to a second term.

Candidate	Party	Votes	%
Alberto Lopez (incumbent)	Lakas–NUCD	73,414	70.73
Francisco Caram	Koalisyong Pambansa/NPC/KBL	25,863	24.92
Fred Binas	Independent	4,303	4.15
Teodorico Tabiana	Independent	192	0.18
Delfin Algeceria	Koalisyong Pambansa	16	0.02
Total		103,788	100.00
Source: Commission on Elections

=== Iloilo's 3rd district ===
Incumbent Licurgo Tirador of Lakas–NUCD won re-election to a second term.

Candidate	Party	Votes	%
Licurgo Tirador (incumbent)	Lakas–NUCD	60,737	63.35
Leo Agustin Lutero	Laban ng Demokratikong Pilipino	33,279	34.71
Honorata Galan	Kilusang Bagong Lipunan	1,857	1.94
Total		95,873	100.00
Source: Commission on Elections

=== Iloilo's 4th district ===
Incumbent Narciso Monfort of Laban ng Demokratikong Pilipino (LDP) ran for the Senate. The LDP nominated Nicetas Panes, who won the election.

Candidate	Party	Votes	%
Nicetas Panes	Laban ng Demokratikong Pilipino	35,136	41.50
Rafael Palmares	Lakas–NUCD	29,672	35.04
Salvador Demaisip	Lakas–NUCD	18,855	22.27
Jesus Solinap	Kilusang Bagong Lipunan	1,009	1.19
Total		84,672	100.00
Source: Commission on Elections

=== Iloilo's 5th district ===
Incumbent Niel Tupas Sr. of Koalisyong Pambansa was re-elected to a second term.

Candidate	Party	Votes	%
Niel Tupas Sr. (incumbent)	Koalisyong Pambansa	47,797	55.12
Victoriano Salcedo	Laban ng Demokratikong Pilipino	37,800	43.59
Rainier Causing	Independent	1,117	1.29
Total		86,714	100.00
Source: Commission on Elections

== Iloilo City ==
Incumbent Rafael Lopez-Vito of Lakas–NUCD was re-elected to a second term.

Candidate	Party	Votes	%
Rafael Lopez Vito (incumbent)	Lakas–NUCD	57,577	
Danilo Vicente Dolido	People's Reform Party		
Rodolfo Ganzon	Nacionalista/Timawa		
Celso Ledesma	Laban ng Demokratikong Pilipino		
Total			
Source: Commission on Elections

== Isabela ==
=== Isabela's 1st district ===
Incumbent Rodolfo Albano Jr. of the Nationalist People's Coalition was re-elected to a second term.

Candidate	Party	Votes	%
Rodolfo Albano Jr. (incumbent)	Nationalist People's Coalition	62,462	92.40
Rafael Jacinto Jr.	Kilusang Bagong Lipunan	4,827	7.14
Edgar Taccad	Independent	302	0.45
Alfonso Singson	Koalisyong Pambansa	7	0.01
Total		67,598	100.00
Source: Commission on Elections

=== Isabela's 2nd district ===
Incumbent Simplicio Domingo Jr. ran for the Isabela Provincial Board in Isabela's 2nd district as the candidate of Lakas–NUCD, Laban ng Demokratikong Pilipino and the Nationalist People's Coalition. The three parties nominated Faustino Dy Jr., who won the election.

Candidate	Party	Votes	%
Faustino Dy Jr.	Lakas–NUCD/LDP/NPC	50,488	74.41
Leocadio Ignacio	Koalisyong Pambansa	16,688	24.60
Canuto Dayag	Kilusang Bagong Lipunan	672	0.99
Total		67,848	100.00
Source: Commission on Elections

=== Isabela's 3rd district ===
Incumbent Santiago Respicio was re-elected to a second term as the candidate of Lakas–NUCD, Laban ng Demokratikong Pilipino and the Nationalist People's Coalition.

Candidate	Party	Votes	%
Santiago Respicio (incumbent)	Lakas–NUCD/LDP/NPC	47,811	58.29
Diosdado Ramirez Sr.	Koalisyong Pambansa	19,660	23.97
Antonio Reyes	Independent	14,557	17.75
Total		82,028	100.00
Source: Commission on Elections

=== Isabela's 4th district ===
Incumbent Antonio Abaya was re-elected to a second term as the candidate of the Nationalist People's Coalition, Kilusang Bagong Lipunan and the Nacionalista Party.

Candidate	Party	Votes	%
Antonio Abaya (incumbent)	NPC/KBL/Nacionalista	52,008	90.79
Iluminada Silverio	Independent	4,215	7.36
Herculano Malana	Kilusang Bagong Lipunan	1,058	1.85
Total		57,281	100.00
Source: Commission on Elections

== Kalinga-Apayao ==
Incumbent William Claver of Lakas–NUCD ran for a second term, but was defeated by Elias Bulut of Laban ng Demokratikong Pilipino.

Candidate	Party	Votes	%
Elias Bulut	Laban ng Demokratikong Pilipino	29,584	42.03
William Claver (incumbent)	Lakas–NUCD	18,716	26.59
Amelia Miranda	Lakas–NUCD	10,843	15.40
Augustus Saboy	Kilusang Bagong Lipunan	9,914	14.08
Zoilo Collado	Kilusang Bagong Lipunan	1,257	1.79
Alfredo Macarandang Jr.	Partido Sambayanang Pilipino	79	0.11
Total		70,393	100.00
Source: Commission on Elections

== La Union ==
=== La Union's 1st district ===
Incumbent Victor Ortega of the Nationalist People's Coalition was re-elected to a second term.

Candidate	Party	Votes	%
Victor Ortega (incumbent)	Nationalist People's Coalition	74,698	76.32
Milagros Magsaysay	Lakas–NUCD	15,182	15.51
Benigno Pulmano	Koalisyong Pambansa	7,995	8.17
Total		97,875	100.00
Source: Commission on Elections

=== La Union's 2nd district ===
Incumbent Jose Aspiras of the Nationalist People's Coalition was re-elected to a second term.

Candidate	Party	Votes	%
Jose Aspiras (incumbent)	Nationalist People's Coalition	68,103	68.30
Gil Gallardo	Koalisyong Pambansa	31,264	31.36
Genaro Hipol Jr.	Independent	170	0.17
Ermelie Ventura	Lakas–NUCD	168	0.17
Total		99,705	100.00
Source: Commission on Elections

== Laguna ==
=== Laguna's 1st district ===
Incumbent Nereo Joaquin of the Nationalist People's Coalition (NPC) ran for governor of Laguna. The NPC nominated Noe Zarate, who was defeated by Roy Almoro of Laban ng Demokratikong Pilipino.

Candidate	Party	Votes	%
Roy Almoro	Laban ng Demokratikong Pilipino	44,756	37.72
Noe Zarate	Nationalist People's Coalition	31,835	26.83
Roman Artes	Laban ng Demokratikong Pilipino	15,360	12.95
Rodolfo Galang	Nacionalista Party	11,364	9.58
Potenciano Flores Jr.	Independent	5,544	4.67
Leonardo Lazarte	Kilusang Bagong Lipunan	3,928	3.31
Luis Alberto	Lakas–NUCD	3,326	2.80
Victor Escueta	Kilusang Bagong Lipunan	1,994	1.68
Roland Rivera	Lakas–NUCD	548	0.46
Total		118,655	100.00
Source: Commission on Elections

=== Laguna's 2nd district ===
Incumbent Jun Chipeco of the Nationalist People's Coalition ran for a second term, but was defeated by Rodolfo Tingzon of Laban ng Demokratikong Pilipino.

Candidate	Party	Votes	%
Rodolfo Tingzon	Laban ng Demokratikong Pilipino	70,870	56.20
Jun Chipeco (incumbent)	Nationalist People's Coalition	55,046	43.65
Fidel Bardos	Independent	181	0.14
Total		126,097	100.00
Source: Commission on Elections

=== Laguna's 3rd district ===
Incumbent Florante Aquino of Laban ng Demokratikong Pilipino was re-elected to a second term.

Candidate	Party	Votes	%
Florante Aquino (incumbent)	Laban ng Demokratikong Pilipino	51,246	43.34
Valeriano Plantilla	Nacionalista Party	24,059	20.35
Ramon de Roma	Koalisyong Pambansa	20,856	17.64
Reynaldo Pineda	Lakas–NUCD	9,689	8.19
Virgilio Gesmundo	Nationalist People's Coalition	8,669	7.33
Marty Desphy	People's Reform Party	3,639	3.08
Abelardo Ardez	Kilusang Bagong Lipunan	81	0.07
Total		118,239	100.00
Source: Commission on Elections

=== Laguna's 4th district ===
Incumbent Magdaleno Palacol Sr. of the Laban ng Demokratikong Pilipino was re-elected to a second term.

Candidate	Party	Votes	%
Magdaleno Palacol Sr. (incumbent)	Laban ng Demokratikong Pilipino	57,649	47.30
Roberto Ramos	Nationalist People's Coalition	28,615	23.48
Emilio Cadayona	Lakas–NUCD	19,513	16.01
Bernardo Relova	Koalisyong Pambansa	7,075	5.81
Florentino Cruz	Nacionalista Party	5,791	4.75
Adolfo Manalo	Independent	1,841	1.51
Amando Valsorable	Kilusang Bagong Lipunan	749	0.61
Daniel Romana	Nacionalista Party	367	0.30
Gervacio Acero Jr.	Kilusang Bagong Lipunan	207	0.17
Demetrio Ballestero	Kilusang Bagong Lipunan	66	0.05
Total		121,873	100.00
Source: Commission on Elections

== Lanao del Norte ==
=== Lanao del Norte's 1st district ===
Incumbent Mariano Badelles of Laban ng Demokratikong Pilipino was re-elected to a second term.

Candidate	Party	Votes	%
Mariano Badelles (incumbent)	Laban ng Demokratikong Pilipino	71,810	67.67
Leonora Cabili	Lakas–NUCD	26,496	24.97
Alan Flores	Kilusang Bagong Lipunan	4,923	4.64
Alfonso Cejudo	Independent	1,056	1.00
Hirohito Sanguila	Koalisyong Pambansa	971	0.92
Felixberto Abellanosa	Nacionalista Party	854	0.80
Errol Zalsos	Nationalist People's Coalition	10	0.01
Total		106,120	100.00
Source: Commission on Elections

=== Lanao del Norte's 2nd district ===
The seat was vacant after Abdullah Dimaporo of the Nacionalista Party resigned on December 12, 1989, to run for Governor of the Autonomous Region in Muslim Mindanao. Macabangkit Lanto of Lakas–NUCD won the election.

Candidate	Party	Votes	%
Macabangkit Lanto	Lakas–NUCD	19,990	30.06
Mario Hisuler	Laban ng Demokratikong Pilipino	18,621	28.00
Abdullah Mangotara	Nationalist People's Coalition	15,048	22.63
Macalawan Maca-ampao	Koalisyong Pambansa	6,216	9.35
Masaranga Umpa	Lakas–NUCD/UMDP	4,900	7.37
Putri Ali Pacasum	None	963	1.45
Camar Pacasum	People's Reform Party	759	1.14
Total		66,497	100.00
Source: Commission on Elections

== Lanao del Sur ==
=== Lanao del Sur's 1st district ===
The seat was vacant after Omar Dianalan of PDP–Laban (later became part of Koalisyong Pambansa died on April 30, 1990. Mamintal Adiong Sr. of Lakas–NUCD won the election.

Candidate	Party	Votes	%
Mamintal Adiong Sr.	Lakas–NUCD	32,489	24.48
Omera Hafidah Lucman	Lakas–NUCD/UMDP	31,304	23.59
Tomanina Gutoc	Lakas–NUCD	25,166	18.96
Tago Sarip	Laban ng Demokratikong Pilipino	22,764	17.15
Abul Khayr Alonto	MFP/Nacionalista	11,999	9.04
Sultan Mesug Calaca	Nationalist People's Coalition	5,596	4.22
Abdulgaffar Busar Magarang	Independent/Nacionalista/KBL	1,031	0.78
Ismael Naga Jr.	Partido ng Masang Pilipino	1,004	0.76
Mohamad-Lomala Panarigan	Partido ng Masang Pilipino	837	0.63
Imaddodin Togod Taulo	Partido Sambayanang Pilipino	515	0.39
Total		132,705	100.00
Source: Commission on Elections

=== Lanao del Sur's 2nd district ===
Incumbent Mohammad Ali Dimaporo of Kilusang Bagong Lipunan was re-elected a second term.

Candidate	Party	Votes	%
Mohammad Ali Dimaporo (incumbent)	Kilusang Bagong Lipunan	18,209	20.07
Pala Dipatuan	Laban ng Demokratikong Pilipino	17,516	19.30
Saduddin Alauya	Ompia/Lakas–NUCD/UMDP	16,027	17.66
Lomala Balindong	Lakas–NUCD	15,512	17.10
Jamil Lucman	Independent	13,988	15.42
Mohamad Ali Balindong	Lakas–NUCD	6,803	7.50
Jacob Malik	Independent/Nacionalista/KBL	2,156	2.38
Sultan Magdaga Palawan	Nacionalista Party	526	0.58
Total		90,737	100.00
Source: Commission on Elections

== Las Piñas–Muntinlupa ==
Incumbent Filemon Aguilar, an independent, retired. Aguilar's son in law, Manny Villar, won the election as an independent.

Candidate	Party	Votes	%
Manny Villar	Independent	99,714	56.27
Eduardo Castillo	Lakas–NUCD	46,285	26.12
Victor Aguinaldo	Emancipated Scientists Party	24,059	13.58
Pacifico Lontok	Independent	2,893	1.63
Agapito Cajanding	Kilusang Bagong Lipunan	1,535	0.87
Melencio Morta	None	1,061	0.60
Roberto Lopez	Independent	748	0.42
Nicolas Leoncio Enciso II	Kilusang Bagong Lipunan	566	0.32
Filipino Alvarado	Emancipated Scientists Party	353	0.20
Total		177,214	100.00
Source: Commission on Elections

== Leyte ==
=== Leyte's 1st district ===
Incumbent Cirilo Roy Montejo of Laban ng Demokratikong Pilipino was re-elected to a second term.

Candidate	Party	Votes	%
Cirilo Roy Montejo (incumbent)	Laban ng Demokratikong Pilipino	47,501	53.61
Benjamin Abella	Koalisyong Pambansa/Lakas–NUCD	19,439	21.94
Lino Esteban Dumas	Independent	8,889	10.03
Damian Aldaba	Kilusang Bagong Lipunan	7,408	8.36
Felix de Veyra	Kilusang Bagong Lipunan	4,651	5.25
Alfredo Romualdez	Nacionalista Party	628	0.71
Wilfredo Boy Manejo	People's Reform Party	92	0.10
Total		88,608	100.00
Source: Commission on Elections

=== Leyte's 2nd district ===
Incumbent Manuel Horca Jr. of Laban ng Demokratikong Pilipino ran for a second term, but was defeated by Sergio Apostol of Kilusang Bagong Lipunan.

Candidate	Party	Votes	%
Sergio Apostol	Kilusang Bagong Lipunan	22,038	27.38
Simeon Kempis	Lakas–NUCD	19,967	24.81
Manuel Horca Jr. (incumbent)	Laban ng Demokratikong Pilipino	15,305	19.01
Rodolfo Lagera	Koalisyong Pambansa	9,658	12.00
Juan Canamaque Jr.	Independent	8,654	10.75
Teofilo Redubla	NPC/KBL	4,584	5.69
Florante Ygana	Partido ng Masang Pilipino	286	0.36
Total		80,492	100.00
Source: Commission on Elections

=== Leyte's 3rd district ===
Incumbent Alberto Veloso of Laban ng Demokratikong Pilipino was re-elected to a second term.

Candidate	Party	Votes	%
Alberto Veloso (incumbent)	Laban ng Demokratikong Pilipino	27,965	40.27
Faustino Tumamak Jr.	Lakas–NUCD	17,755	25.57
Jose Gonzales	Koalisyong Pambansa/NPC	17,151	24.70
Virginia Veloso	Nacionalista Party	6,575	9.47
Total		69,446	100.00
Source: Commission on Elections

=== Leyte's 4th district ===
Incumbent Carmelo Locsin of Lakas–NUCD was re-elected to a second term.

Candidate	Party	Votes	%
Carmelo Locsin (incumbent)	Lakas–NUCD	42,836	45.24
Jorge Tan Jr.	Nationalist People's Coalition	28,726	30.33
Esteban Conejos Jr.	Kilusang Bagong Lipunan	23,118	24.41
Felix Cantal	Kilusang Bagong Lipunan	16	0.02
Total		94,696	100.00
Source: Commission on Elections

=== Leyte's 5th district ===
Incumbent Eriberto Loreto of Laban ng Demokratikong Pilipino was re-elected to a second term.

Candidate	Party	Votes	%
Eriberto Loreto (incumbent)	Laban ng Demokratikong Pilipino	57,760	59.77
Beatriz Robles	Lakas–NUCD	25,908	26.81
Nello Roa	Nationalist People's Coalition	8,454	8.75
Rolando Tomandao	None	4,215	4.36
Federico Jaca	Koalisyong Pambansa	291	0.30
Delia Truya	Koalisyong Pambansa/KBL	15	0.02
Total		96,643	100.00
Source: Commission on Elections

== Maguindanao ==
=== Maguindanao's 1st district ===
Incumbent Michael Mastura of Laban ng Demokratikong Pilipino was re-elected to a second term.

Candidate	Party	Votes	%
Michael Mastura (incumbent)	Laban ng Demokratikong Pilipino	37,918	33.26
Didagen Dilangalen	Nationalist People's Coalition	33,795	29.64
Noah Ibay	Lakas–NUCD/UMDP	21,487	18.85
Estrellita Juliano	Independent	18,296	16.05
Gilbert Lao	Partido ng Masang Pilipino	1,033	0.91
Roger Limba	Kilusang Bagong Lipunan	431	0.38
Alvaro Andaya	Independent	396	0.35
Felixberto Bautista	Independent	368	0.32
Datu Esmael Pangilinan	None	289	0.25
Total		114,013	100.00
Source: Commission on Elections

=== Maguindanao's 2nd district ===
Incumbent Guimid Matalam ran for a second term as the candidate of Lakas–NUCD and the Union of Muslim Democrats, but was defeated by Simeon Datumanong, who was the candidate of Laban ng Demokratikong Pilipino and the Nacionalista Party.

Candidate	Party	Votes	%
Simeon Datumanong	LDP/Nacionalista	53,264	56.38
Guimid Matalam (incumbent)	Lakas–NUCD/UMDP	40,588	42.96
Ibrahim Usman	Partido ng Masang Pilipino	626	0.66
Total		94,478	100.00
Source: Commission on Elections

== Makati ==
Incumbent Maria Consuelo Puyat-Reyes of Laban ng Demokratikong Pilipino is running for Mayor of Makati. Joker Arroyo won the election as an independent.

Candidate	Party	Votes	%
Joker Arroyo	Independent	97,055	46.66
Augusto Syjuco Jr.	Move Makati	84,398	40.57
Bernabe Soledad Jr.	Koalisyong Pambansa	15,841	7.62
Jose Fidel Coronel	Kilusang Bagong Lipunan	9,239	4.44
Valentin Habijon	People's Reform Party	974	0.47
Napoleon de los Santos	Kilusang Bagong Lipunan	510	0.25
Total		208,017	100.00
Source: Commission on Elections

== Malabon–Navotas ==
Incumbent Tessie Aquino-Oreta of Laban ng Demokratikong Pilipino was re-elected to a second term.

Candidate	Party	Votes	%
Tessie Aquino-Oreta (incumbent)	Laban ng Demokratikong Pilipino	83,493	55.47
Jesus Tachanco	Nationalist People's Coalition	64,072	42.57
Edgardo Gamir	People's Reform Party	2,950	1.96
Total		150,515	100.00
Source: Commission on Elections

== Manila ==
=== Manila's 1st district ===
Incumbent Martin Isidro of Laban ng Demokratikong Pilipino was re-elected to a second term.

Candidate	Party	Votes	%
Martin Isidro (incumbent)	Laban ng Demokratikong Pilipino	75,488	62.16
Ernesto Dionisio	Koalisyong Pambansa	39,193	32.27
Cesar Serrano	Kilusang Bagong Lipunan	4,306	3.55
Crisogono Bayani Jr.	Nationalist People's Coalition	2,310	1.90
Camilo Loforteza	People's Reform Party	105	0.09
Guadalupe Cabiades	Partido Sambayanang Pilipino	38	0.03
Total		121,440	100.00
Source: Commission on Elections

=== Manila's 2nd district ===
Incumbent Jaime Lopez of Lakas–NUCD was re-elected to a second term.

Candidate	Party	Votes	%
Jaime Lopez (incumbent)	Lakas–NUCD	49,447	44.11
Jimmy Bautista	Koalisyong Pambansa	28,903	25.79
Florante Yambot	Independent	12,531	11.18
Alberto Lim	Nationalist People's Coalition	11,039	9.85
Romeo Ramin	People's Reform Party	6,774	6.04
Blesilda Flores	Kilusang Bagong Lipunan	3,394	3.03
Total		112,088	100.00
Source: Commission on Elections

=== Manila's 3rd district ===
Incumbent Leonardo Fugoso of Koalisyong Pambansa was re-elected to a second term.

Candidate	Party	Votes	%
Leonardo Fugoso (incumbent)	Koalisyong Pambansa	32,718	37.89
Susana Ong	Laban ng Demokratikong Pilipino	22,164	25.67
Alex Co	Lakas–NUCD	18,470	21.39
Meliza Galang	Nationalist People's Coalition	9,429	10.92
Gil de Guzman	People's Reform Party	3,572	4.14
Total		86,353	100.00
Source: Commission on Elections

=== Manila's 4th district ===
Incumbent Ramon Bagatsing Jr. of Laban ng Demokratikong Pilipino was re-elected to a second term.

Candidate	Party	Votes	%
Ramon Bagatsing Jr. (incumbent)	Laban ng Demokratikong Pilipino	59,149	57.37
Salvador Tolentino	Nacionalista/NPC	14,029	13.61
Emilio Bonoan	Lakas–NUCD	12,640	12.26
Eduardo Quintos	Koalisyong Pambansa	9,699	9.41
Alex Gonzales	People's Reform Party	7,588	7.36
Total		103,105	100.00
Source: Commission on Elections

=== Manila's 5th district ===
Incumbent Amado Bagatsing of Laban ng Demokratikong Pilipino was re-elected to a second term.

Candidate	Party	Votes	%
Amado Bagatsing (incumbent)	Laban ng Demokratikong Pilipino	62,094	54.28
Felicisimo Cabigao	Lakas–NUCD	24,118	21.08
Suzano Gonzales	Nationalist People's Coalition	16,489	14.41
Emmanuel Santos	People's Reform Party	7,448	6.51
Willie Espiritu	Nacionalista/KBL	3,609	3.15
Bert Fuentes	Koalisyong Pambansa	234	0.20
Librado Cuarasal	Kilusang Bagong Lipunan	195	0.17
Jose Canda	People's Reform Party	111	0.10
Emma Flores	Independent	105	0.09
Total		114,403	100.00
Source: Commission on Elections

=== Manila's 6th district ===
Incumbent Pablo V. Ocampo of the Nationalist People's Coalition (NPC) ran for mayor of Manila. The NPC nominated Ocampo's daughter, Rosenda Ann Ocampo, who won the election.

Candidate	Party	Votes	%
Rosenda Ann Ocampo	Nationalist People's Coalition	30,539	28.55
Julio Logarta	Laban ng Demokratikong Pilipino	19,351	18.09
Benedicto Dorado	Lakas–NUCD	18,595	17.39
Fernando Carrascoso	Laban ng Demokratikong Pilipino	17,686	16.54
Quirino Marquinez	People's Reform Party	11,885	11.11
Marcial Magsino	Koalisyong Pambansa	6,910	6.46
Federico Blay	Kilusang Bagong Lipunan	1,988	1.86
Total		106,954	100.00
Source: Commission on Elections

== Marikina ==
Incumbent Democlito Angeles of Koalisyong Pambansa retired. Koalisyong Pambansa nominated Adriano de la Paz and Felizardo Bulaong, who were both defeated by Romeo Candazo of Laban ng Demokratikong Pilipino.

Candidate	Party	Votes	%
Romeo Candazo	Laban ng Demokratikong Pilipino	27,907	25.62
Renato Cheng	Lakas–NUCD	21,217	19.48
Adriano de la Paz	Koalisyong Pambansa	12,864	11.81
Teofisto Santos	Nationalist People's Coalition	9,173	8.42
Bayani Vergara	Nacionalista Party	8,987	8.25
Virgilio Farcon	Grand Alliance for Democracy	8,352	7.67
Cesar Ching	People's Reform Party	6,131	5.63
Felizardo Bulaong	Koalisyong Pambansa	4,525	4.15
Cesar Turiano	Partido ng Masang Pilipino	3,458	3.18
Benjamin Molina	Independent	3,149	2.89
Anthony Mendoza	Kilusang Bagong Lipunan	2,259	2.07
Pantaleon Gavino	Independent	396	0.36
Rizalino Concepcion	Kilusang Bagong Lipunan	350	0.32
Reynaldo Fino	Emancipated Scientists Party	61	0.06
Domingo Garcia	Nacionalista/KBL	49	0.04
Venancio Tacata	Partido Sambayanang Pilipino	32	0.03
Total		108,910	100.00
Source: Commission on Elections

== Marinduque ==
Incumbent Carmencita Reyes of Laban ng Demokratikong Pilipino was re-elected to a second term.

Candidate	Party	Votes	%
Carmencita Reyes (incumbent)	Laban ng Demokratikong Pilipino	37,608	58.53
Francisco Lecaroz	Nationalist People's Coalition	22,721	35.36
Salvador Jamilla	Lakas–NUCD	3,928	6.11
Total		64,257	100.00
Source: Commission on Elections

== Masbate ==
=== Masbate's 1st district ===
Incumbent Tito Espinosa of Laban ng Demokratikong Pilipino was re-elected to a second term.

Candidate	Party	Votes	%
Tito Espinosa (incumbent)	Laban ng Demokratikong Pilipino	19,286	54.78
Manuel Bunan	Lakas–NUCD	14,883	42.27
Teodorico Almine Sr.	Independent	1,038	2.95
Total		35,207	100.00
Source: Commission on Elections

=== Masbate's 2nd district ===
Incumbent Luz Cleta Bakunawa of Laban ng Demokratikong Pilipino was re-elected to a second term.

Candidate	Party	Votes	%
Luz Cleta Bakunawa (incumbent)	Laban ng Demokratikong Pilipino	35,215	59.04
Orlando Danao	Koalisyong Pambansa/NPC	14,007	23.48
Edelson Oliva	Independent	5,249	8.80
Lily Pujol	Lakas–NUCD	5,177	8.68
Total		59,648	100.00
Source: Commission on Elections

=== Masbate's 3rd district ===
The seat was vacant after Moises Espinosa, an independent, was assassinated on March 17, 1989. Antonio Kho of Lakas–NUCD won the election.

Candidate	Party	Votes	%
Antonio Kho	Lakas–NUCD	31,095	49.19
Moises Espinosa Jr.	Independent	23,825	37.69
Alfonso Alino Sr.	Lapiang Manggagawa	4,554	7.20
Regino Tambago	Laban ng Demokratikong Pilipino	2,427	3.84
Vicente Lim Sr.	Independent	733	1.16
Floresto Arizala	Nacionalista Party	559	0.88
Constancio Salubre	Philippine Republican Reformist Party	22	0.03
Total		63,215	100.00
Source: Commission on Elections

== Misamis Occidental ==
=== Misamis Occidental's 1st district ===
Incumbent Julio Ozamiz of Laban ng Demokratikong Pilipino ran for a second term, but was defeated by Percival Catane of the Nationalist People's Coalition.

Candidate	Party	Votes	%
Percival Catane	Nationalist People's Coalition	40,400	58.01
Julio Ozamiz (incumbent)	Laban ng Demokratikong Pilipino	27,695	39.77
Fortunato Clavano Jr.	Nacionalista Party	1,306	1.88
Pacifico Malfier Jr.	Independent	240	0.34
Total		69,641	100.00
Source: Commission on Elections

=== Misamis Occidental's 2nd district ===
Incumbent Hilarion Ramiro Jr. of Lakas–NUCD was re-elected to a second term.

Candidate	Party	Votes	%
Hilarion Ramiro Jr. (incumbent)	Lakas–NUCD	34,982	43.93
Ceferino Ong	Nationalist People's Coalition	29,646	37.23
Estanislao Badiongan Sr.	Laban ng Demokratikong Pilipino	11,023	13.84
Ramon Mabang	People's Reform Party	2,322	2.92
Balmes Ocampos	Nacionalista Party	1,390	1.75
Samuel Suico	Kilusang Bagong Lipunan	272	0.34
Total		79,635	100.00
Source: Commission on Elections

== Misamis Oriental ==
=== Misamis Oriental's 1st district ===
Incumbent Isacio Pelaez of Koalisyong Pambansa ran for a second term, but was defeated by Homobono Cezar of the Laban ng Demokratikong Pilipino.

Candidate	Party	Votes	%
Homobono Cezar	Laban ng Demokratikong Pilipino	37,272	49.02
Isacio Pelaez (incumbent)	Koalisyong Pambansa	27,129	35.68
Felipe Acenas Jr.	Lakas–NUCD	9,688	12.74
Demosthenes Mediante Sr.	Nacionalista Party	1,778	2.34
Edgar Polinar	KBL/Independent	172	0.23
Total		76,039	100.00
Source: Commission on Elections

=== Misamis Oriental's 2nd district ===
Incumbent Victorico Chaves of Laban ng Demokratikong Pilipino was re-elected to a second term.

Candidate	Party	Votes	%
Victorico Chaves (incumbent)	Laban ng Demokratikong Pilipino	37,765	43.07
Frederico Gapuz	Koalisyong Pambansa	24,423	27.86
Augusto Baculio	Independent	21,041	24.00
Teddy Cabeltes Sr.	Lakas–NUCD	3,168	3.61
Galdino Jardin Sr.	Koalisyong Pambansa	1,164	1.33
Crisanto Requino	Kilusang Bagong Lipunan	113	0.13
Total		87,674	100.00
Source: Commission on Elections

== Mountain Province ==
Incumbent Victor Dominguez of Lakas–NUCD was re-elected to a second term.

Candidate	Party	Votes	%
Victor Dominguez (incumbent)	Lakas–NUCD	20,432	52.14
Roy Pilando	NPC/Koalisyong Pambansa	17,413	44.44
Eduardo Badecao	Kilusang Bagong Lipunan	1,341	3.42
Total		39,186	100.00
Source: Commission on Elections

== Negros Occidental ==
=== Negros Occidental's 1st district ===
Incumbent Salvador Laguda of Laban ng Demokratikong Pilipino (LDP) ran for Vice Governor of Negros Occidental. The LDP nominated Giovanni Benigno, who was defeated by Tranquilino Carmona of the Nationalist People's Coalition.

Candidate	Party	Votes	%
Tranquilino Carmona	Nationalist People's Coalition	36,746	56.97
Samuel Lezama	Lakas–NUCD	27,423	42.51
Giovanni Benigno	Laban ng Demokratikong Pilipino	335	0.52
Total		64,504	100.00
Source: Commission on Elections

=== Negros Occidental's 2nd district ===
Incumbent Manuel Puey of Koalisyong Pambansa was re-elected to a second term.

Candidate	Party	Votes	%
Manuel Puey (incumbent)	Koalisyong Pambansa	42,818	57.64
Rowena Guanzon	Lakas–NUCD/NPC	31,441	42.32
Rudy Abastillas	Kilusang Bagong Lipunan	29	0.04
Ronnie Bautista	Laban ng Demokratikong Pilipino	1	0.00
Total		74,289	100.00
Source: Commission on Elections

=== Negros Occidental's 3rd district ===
Incumbent Jose Carlos Lacson of Laban ng Demokratikong Pilipino was re-elected to a second term.

Candidate	Party	Votes	%
Jose Carlos Lacson (incumbent)	Laban ng Demokratikong Pilipino	62,168	54.12
Alex Montelibano	Nationalist People's Coalition	52,694	45.88
Total		114,862	100.00
Source: Commission on Elections

=== Negros Occidental's 4th district ===
Incumbent Edward Matti of the Nationalist People's Coalition was re-elected to a second term.

Candidate	Party	Votes	%
Edward Matti (incumbent)	Nationalist People's Coalition	52,461	58.05
Guillermo Araneta	Lakas–NUCD	29,486	32.63
Abundio Huelar	Independent	5,387	5.96
Victor Villanosa	Independent	2,348	2.60
Hernando Nacion	Laban ng Demokratikong Pilipino	386	0.43
Sergio Murillo	Kilusang Bagong Lipunan	310	0.34
Total		90,378	100.00
Source: Commission on Elections

=== Negros Occidental's 5th district ===
Incumbent Mariano Yulo of the Nationalist People's Coalition was re-elected to a second term.

Candidate	Party	Votes	%
Mariano Yulo (incumbent)	Nationalist People's Coalition	45,088	53.17
Enrique Montella	Laban ng Demokratikong Pilipino	34,816	41.05
Zoilo Bayona	Koalisyong Pambansa	4,188	4.94
Johanne Pena Jr.	Kilusang Bagong Lipunan	443	0.52
Felipe Padilla	People's Reform Party	271	0.32
Total		84,806	100.00
Source: Commission on Elections

=== Negros Occidental's 6th district ===
Incumbent Hortensia Starke of Lakas–NUCD was re-elected to a second term.

Candidate	Party	Votes	%
Hortensia Starke (incumbent)	Lakas–NUCD	45,361	62.77
Henry Selgado	Nationalist People's Coalition	16,175	22.38
Norman Perez	Koalisyong Pambansa	10,167	14.07
Pedie Loreto	Independent/KBL	475	0.66
Paterno Salvacion	Laban ng Demokratikong Pilipino	72	0.10
Jose Ibañez	Kilusang Bagong Lipunan	19	0.03
Total		72,269	100.00
Source: Commission on Elections

== Negros Oriental ==
=== Negros Oriental's 1st district ===
Incumbent Jerome Paras of Lakas–NUCD was re-elected to a second term.

Candidate	Party	Votes	%
Jerome Paras (incumbent)	Lakas–NUCD	47,678	54.03
Andres Bustamante	Nationalist People's Coalition	40,303	45.67
Alfonso Baguio	Independent	192	0.22
Rolly Bongoyan	Laban ng Demokratikong Pilipino	69	0.08
Total		88,242	100.00
Source: Commission on Elections

=== Negros Oriental's 2nd district ===
Incumbent Miguel Romero of Laban ng Demokratikong Pilipino was re-elected to a second term.

Candidate	Party	Votes	%
Miguel Romero (incumbent)	Laban ng Demokratikong Pilipino	64,585	58.24
Joanie Sycip	Nationalist People's Coalition	37,244	33.59
Venancio Aldecoa Jr.	Lakas–NUCD	7,743	6.98
Gerardo Maximo	Independent	1,084	0.98
Edgar Remollo	Kilusang Bagong Lipunan	196	0.18
Raul Aninon	Kilusang Bagong Lipunan	37	0.03
Total		110,889	100.00
Source: Commission on Elections

=== Negros Oriental's 3rd district ===
Incumbent Margarito Teves of Laban ng Demokratikong Pilipino was re-elected to a second term.

Candidate	Party	Votes	%
Margarito Teves (incumbent)	Laban ng Demokratikong Pilipino	40,276	53.34
Teofisto Yap	Nationalist People's Coalition	23,392	30.98
Felix Gaudiel	Lakas–NUCD	9,678	12.82
Generoso Magsaysay	Kilusang Bagong Lipunan	2,157	2.86
Total		75,503	100.00
Source: Commission on Elections

== Northern Samar ==
=== Northern Samar's 1st district ===
Incumbent Raul Daza of Koalisyong Pambansa was re-elected to a second term.

Candidate	Party	Votes	%
Raul Daza (incumbent)	Koalisyong Pambansa	38,990	60.98
Arturo Dubongo	Lakas–NUCD/Laban ng Demokratikong Pilipino	14,279	22.33
Guido Lauin Jr.	Nationalist People's Coalition	7,901	12.36
Pio Merida	Lakas–NUCD	2,676	4.19
Jaime Cebujano	Independent	95	0.15
Total		63,941	100.00
Source: Commission on Elections

=== Northern Samar's 2nd district ===
Incumbent Jose Ong Jr. of Lakas–NUCD ran for a second term, but was defeated by Wilmar Lucero of Koalisyong Pambansa.

Candidate	Party	Votes	%
Wilmar Lucero	Koalisyong Pambansa	24,415	
Pacifico Namocale	People's Reform Party		
Jose Ong Jr. (incumbent)	Lakas–NUCD		
Pepito Rivas	Nationalist People's Coalition		
Total			
Source: Commission on Elections

== Nueva Ecija ==
=== Nueva Ecija's 1st district ===
Incumbent Eduardo Nonato Joson of Bagong Lakas ng Nueva Ecija (Balane) retired. Balane, in coalition with the Nationalist People's Coalition, nominated Romeo Capulong, who was defeated by Renato Diaz of Lakas–NUCD.

Candidate	Party	Votes	%
Renato Diaz	Lakas–NUCD	41,764	35.48
Jose Dizon	Laban ng Demokratikong Pilipino	35,949	30.54
Romeo Capulong	NPC/Balane	34,566	29.36
Hermogenes Pablo	Nacionalista Party	5,447	4.63
Total		117,726	100.00
Source: Commission on Elections

=== Nueva Ecija's 2nd district ===
Incumbent Simeon Garcia Jr. of Laban ng Demokratikong Pilipino ran for a second term, but was defeated by Eleuterio Violago, who is the candidate of the Nationalist People's Coalition and Bagong Lakas ng Nueva Ecija.

Candidate	Party	Votes	%
Eleuterio Violago	NPC/Balane	57,647	54.02
Simeon Garcia Jr. (incumbent)	Laban ng Demokratikong Pilipino	36,234	33.95
Hermogenes Concepcion Jr.	Laban ng Demokratikong Pilipino	8,531	7.99
Jose Espino	Lakas–NUCD	4,306	4.03
Total		106,718	100.00
Source: Commission on Elections

=== Nueva Ecija's 3rd district ===
Incumbent Hermogenes Concepcion Jr. of Laban ng Demokratikong Pilipino ran for a second term in Nueva Ecija's 2nd district. Pacifico Fajardo won the election unopposed as the candidate of the Nationalist People's Coalition and Bagong Lakas ng Nueva Ecija.

Candidate	Party	Votes	%
Pacifico Fajardo	NPC/Balane	60,083	100.00
Total		60,083	100.00
Source: Commission on Elections

=== Nueva Ecija's 4th district ===
The seat was vacant after Nicanor de Guzman Jr. of Laban ng Demokratikong Pilipino (LDP) resigned on August 7, 1990. De Guzman ran as an independent candidate in coalition with the LDP and Lakas–NUCD, but was defeated by Victorio Lorenzo, another LDP candidate.

Candidate	Party	Votes	%
Victorio Lorenzo	Laban ng Demokratikong Pilipino	47,749	37.81
Julita Villareal	NPC/Balane	35,572	28.17
Nicanor de Guzman Jr.	Independent/LDP/Lakas–NUCD	29,976	23.74
Justino Padiernos	Lakas–NUCD	7,927	6.28
Celso Mariano	Koalisyong Pambansa	5,049	4.00
Total		126,273	100.00
Source: Commission on Elections

== Nueva Vizcaya ==
Incumbent Carlos Padilla of Laban ng Demokratikong Pilipino (LDP) ran for the Senate. The LDP nominated Epifanio Gallima, who was defeated by Leonardo B. Perez of the Nationalist People's Coalition.

Candidate	Party	Votes	%
Leonardo B. Perez	Nationalist People's Coalition	46,284	46.26
Epifanio Galima	Laban ng Demokratikong Pilipino	43,728	43.70
Eficio Acosta	Lakas–NUCD	4,857	4.85
Angel Alumit	People's Reform Party	3,353	3.35
Quirico Pilotin	Kilusang Bagong Lipunan	1,459	1.46
Felizardo Victorio	Kilusang Bagong Lipunan	377	0.38
Total		100,058	100.00
Source: Commission on Elections

== Occidental Mindoro ==
Incumbent Mario Gene Mendiola of the Nationalist People's Coalition ran for a second term, but was defeated by Jose Villarosa of Laban ng Demokratikong Pilipino.

Candidate	Party	Votes	%
Jose Villarosa	Laban ng Demokratikong Pilipino	39,635	50.98
Mario Gene Mendiola (incumbent)	Nationalist People's Coalition	25,201	32.41
Ernesto Jaravata	Nacionalista Party	10,499	13.50
Eufroncino Ramos	Koalisyong Pambansa	2,414	3.10
Total		77,749	100.00
Source: Commission on Elections

== Oriental Mindoro ==
=== Oriental Mindoro's 1st district ===
Incumbent Rodolfo Valencia of Koalisyong Pambansa ran for Governor of Oriental Mindoro. Renato Leviste of the Nacionalista Party won the election.

Candidate	Party	Votes	%
Renato Leviste	Nacionalista Party	46,779	53.91
Rolleo Ignacio	Lakas–NUCD	39,987	46.09
Total		86,766	100.00
Source: Commission on Elections

=== Oriental Mindoro's 2nd district ===
Incumbent Jesus Punzalan of Laban ng Demokratikong Pilipino was re-elected to a second term.

Candidate	Party	Votes	%
Jesus Punzalan (incumbent)	Laban ng Demokratikong Pilipino	28,436	41.64
Reynaldo Umali	Nationalist People's Coalition	14,759	21.61
Emelina Baldos	Koalisyong Pambansa	13,507	19.78
Sergio Maliwang	Lakas–NUCD	11,592	16.97
Total		68,294	100.00
Source: Commission on Elections

== Palawan ==
=== Palawan's 1st district ===
Incumbent David Ponce de Leon of Laban ng Demokratikong Pilipino was re-elected to a second term.

Candidate	Party	Votes	%
David Ponce de Leon (incumbent)	Laban ng Demokratikong Pilipino	40,394	72.99
Bonifacio Madarcos	Nationalist People's Coalition	10,965	19.81
Raymundo Fernandez	Kilusang Bagong Lipunan	1,503	2.72
Vicente Rodriguez	Lakas–NUCD	1,485	2.68
Roland Pay	Koalisyong Pambansa	995	1.80
Total		55,342	100.00
Source: Commission on Elections

=== Palawan's 2nd district ===
Incumbent Ramon Mitra Jr. of Laban ng Demokratikong Pilipino (LDP) ran for President of the Philippines. The LDP nominated Alfredo Amor Abueg Jr., who won the election.

Candidate	Party	Votes	%
Alfredo Amor Abueg Jr.	Laban ng Demokratikong Pilipino	37,394	43.97
Jose Nolledo	Independent	32,709	38.46
Elvira Abiog	Lakas–NUCD	7,169	8.43
Walfredo Ponce de Leon	Nationalist People's Coalition	5,133	6.04
Rogelio Bolivar	Kilusang Bagong Lipunan	2,642	3.11
Total		85,047	100.00
Source: Commission on Elections

== Pampanga ==
=== Pampanga's 1st district ===
Incumbent Carmelo Lazatin Sr. of Laban ng Demokratikong Pilipino was re-elected to a second term.

Candidate	Party	Votes	%
Carmelo Lazatin Sr. (incumbent)	Laban ng Demokratikong Pilipino	66,474	73.17
Wilfredo Halili	Nationalist People's Coalition	12,002	13.21
Adelaido Rivera	Koalisyong Pambansa	11,984	13.19
Rogelio Tiglao	Kilusang Bagong Lipunan	210	0.23
Roland Pay	People's Reform Party	162	0.18
Benjamin Villanueva	Independent	18	0.02
Total		90,850	100.00
Source: Commission on Elections

=== Pampanga's 2nd district ===
Incumbent Emigdio Lingad of Laban ng Demokratikong Pilipino was re-elected to a second term.

Candidate	Party	Votes	%
Emigdio Lingad (incumbent)	Laban ng Demokratikong Pilipino	49,779	41.32
Jesus Nicdao	Lakas–NUCD	37,650	31.25
Aber Canlas	NPC/KBL/Independent	29,914	24.83
Edilberto Paule	Koalisyong Pambansa	500	0.41
Rogelio Bolivar	Kilusang Bagong Lipunan	2,642	2.19
Total		120,485	100.00
Source: Commission on Elections

=== Pampanga's 3rd district ===
Incumbent Oscar Samson Rodriguez of Laban ng Demokratikong Pilipino ran for a second term, but was defeated by Andrea D. Domingo of Lakas–NUCD.

Candidate	Party	Votes	%
Andrea D. Domingo	Lakas–NUCD	68,602	56.19
Oscar Samson Rodriguez (incumbent)	Laban ng Demokratikong Pilipino	45,576	37.33
Vicente Macalino	Nationalist People's Coalition	7,468	6.12
Aurelio Villanueva	Kilusang Bagong Lipunan	440	0.36
Total		122,086	100.00
Source: Commission on Elections

=== Pampanga's 4th district ===
Incumbent Emigdio Bondoc of Nacionalista Party was re-elected to a second term.

Candidate	Party	Votes	%
Emigdio Bondoc (incumbent)	Nacionalista Party	47,811	51.95
Marciano Pineda	Lakas–NUCD	21,084	22.91
Cicero Punzalan	Nationalist People's Coalition	11,399	12.38
Ernesto Pineda	Koalisyong Pambansa	5,387	5.85
Reynaldo Sagum	People's Reform Party	3,757	4.08
Antonio Salvador	People's Reform Party	2,573	2.80
Manuel Quito	Independent	30	0.03
Total		92,041	100.00
Source: Commission on Elections

== Pangasinan ==
=== Pangasinan's 1st district ===
The seat was vacant after Oscar Orbos of Laban ng Demokratikong Pilipino resigned on January 1, 1990, upon being appointed as Secretary of Transportation. Orbos won the election as an independent.

Candidate	Party	Votes	%
Oscar Orbos	Independent	94,294	91.20
Arnulfo Cabrera	Lakas–NUCD	3,834	3.71
Cirilo Radoc	Independent	1,814	1.75
Ambrosio Rodriguez Jr.	NPC/KBL	1,627	1.57
Isauro Catabay	Independent	1,087	1.05
Efren Peralta	Independent	688	0.67
Emmanuel Celzo	Independent	44	0.04
Total		103,388	100.00
Source: Commission on Elections

=== Pangasinan's 2nd district ===
Incumbent Antonio Bengson III of Laban ng Demokratikong Pilipino ran for re-election to a second term, but was defeated by Chris Mendoza of Lakas–NUCD.

Candidate	Party	Votes	%
Chris Mendoza	Lakas–NUCD	58,031	56.30
Antonio Bengson III (incumbent)	Laban ng Demokratikong Pilipino	43,657	42.36
Vicente Ferrer	Kilusang Bagong Lipunan	1,257	1.22
Benedicto Dizon	Nationalist People's Coalition	69	0.07
Lester Escobar	Independent	56	0.05
Total		103,070	100.00
Source: Commission on Elections

=== Pangasinan's 3rd district ===
Incumbent Fabian Sison of Laban ng Demokratikong Pilipino ran for a second term, but was defeated by Eric Galo Acuña, who is the candidate of the Nationalist People's Coalition and Kilusang Bagong Lipunan.

Candidate	Party	Votes	%
Eric Galo Acuña	NPC/KBL	63,873	43.01
Lex Apollo Soriano	Lakas–NUCD	38,949	26.23
Fabian Sison (incumbent)	Laban ng Demokratikong Pilipino	37,494	25.25
Leopoldo Tulagan Sr.	Independent	3,567	2.40
Nestor Pascual	Kilusang Bagong Lipunan	2,911	1.96
Araceli Martinez	Nacionalista Party	1,283	0.86
Jesus Casingal	People's Reform Party	419	0.28
Total		148,496	100.00
Source: Commission on Elections

=== Pangasinan's 4th district ===
Incumbent Jose de Venecia Jr. of Lakas–NUCD was re-elected to a second term.

Candidate	Party	Votes	%
Jose de Venecia Jr. (incumbent)	Lakas–NUCD	70,989	69.14
Gonzalo Duque	LDP/Koalisyong Pambansa/Nacionalista	31,683	30.86
Total		102,672	100.00
Source: Commission on Elections

=== Pangasinan's 5th district ===
Incumbent Conrado Estrella Jr. ran for Governor of Pangasinan as the candidate of the Nationalist People's Coalition (NPC), the Nacionalista Party and Kilusang Bagong Lipunan. The NPC nominated Dulce Estrella, who was defeated by Amadeo Perez Jr. of Laban ng Demokratikong Pilipino.

Candidate	Party	Votes	%
Amadeo Perez Jr.	Laban ng Demokratikong Pilipino	66,088	53.63
Antonio Villar Jr.	Lakas–NUCD	41,281	33.50
Dulce Estrella	Nationalist People's Coalition	15,867	12.88
Total		123,236	100.00
Source: Commission on Elections

=== Pangasinan's 6th district ===
Incumbent Conrado Estrella III was re-elected to a second term as the candidate of the Nationalist People's Coalition, Kilusang Bagong Lipunan and the Grand Alliance for Democracy.

Candidate	Party	Votes	%
Conrado Estrella III (incumbent)	NPC/KBL/GAD	45,028	41.67
Rosario Colet	Laban ng Demokratikong Pilipino	37,735	34.92
Gregorio Cendana	KBL/NPC	24,697	22.86
Fermin Gonzales	Partido ng Masang Pilipino	524	0.48
Lyn Velasquez	Lakas–NUCD	64	0.06
Virgilio Cesar	Kilusang Bagong Lipunan	1	0.00
Total		108,049	100.00
Source: Commission on Elections

== Parañaque ==
Incumbent Freddie Webb of Laban ng Demokratikong Pilipino (LDP) ran for the Senate. The LDP nominated Roilo Golez, who won the election.

Candidate	Party	Votes	%
Roilo Golez	Laban ng Demokratikong Pilipino	73,823	66.01
Eduardo Zialcita	Lakas–NUCD	23,816	21.30
Jose Sarmiento	Koalisyong Pambansa	7,787	6.96
William Ferrer	People's Reform Party	1,797	1.61
Ireneo Amante	Nationalist People's Coalition	1,731	1.55
Lauro Vizconde	Lakas–NUCD	1,731	1.55
Rosalinda Tecson	Kilusang Bagong Lipunan	500	0.45
Ernesto Dacuycuy	Kilusang Bagong Lipunan	466	0.42
Salvador Constiniano	Independent	180	0.16
Pacifico Rosal	Independent	5	0.00
Total		111,836	100.00
Source: Commission on Elections

== Pasay ==
Incumbent Lorna Verano Yap of Koalisyong Pambansa ran for the Senate. Koalisyong Pambansa nominated Cesar Santiago, who was defeated by Jovito Claudio of Laban ng Demokratikong Pilipino.

Candidate	Party	Votes	%
Jovito Claudio	Laban ng Demokratikong Pilipino	51,802	40.59
Edgardo Cuneta	Independent	43,093	33.77
Cesar Santiago	Koalisyong Pambansa	20,968	16.43
Jose Comendador	Independent	5,321	4.17
Panfillo Villaruel	Partido Demokratiko Sosyalista ng Pilipinas	4,028	3.16
Reynaldo Cuyugan	People's Reform Party	1,476	1.16
Armando San Juan	PB/Lakas–NUCD	698	0.55
Francisco Penaflor	Independent	191	0.15
David Reyes	Independent	43	0.03
Pacifico Rosal	Independent	5	0.00
Total		127,625	100.00
Source: Commission on Elections

== Pasig ==
Incumbent Rufino Javier of the Nationalist People's Coalition was re-elected to a second term.

Candidate	Party	Votes	%
Rufino Javier (incumbent)	Nationalist People's Coalition	57,962	49.49
Noel Regino Medina	Koalisyong Pambansa	48,235	41.18
Esmeraldo Batacan	Laban ng Demokratikong Pilipino	9,346	7.98
Carlos Ambrosio	Lakas–NUCD	1,411	1.20
Eleuterio Tuazon	Partido ng Masang Pilipino	164	0.14
Total		117,118	100.00
Source: Commission on Elections

== Quezon ==
=== Quezon's 1st district ===
Incumbent Wilfrido Enverga of Laban ng Demokratikong Pilipino was re-elected to a second term.

Candidate	Party	Votes	%
Wilfrido Enverga (incumbent)	Laban ng Demokratikong Pilipino	51,750	60.38
Tomas Abuel Jr.	Nationalist People's Coalition	20,726	24.18
Cirilo Radoc	Lakas–NUCD/Koalisyong Pambansa	13,231	15.44
Total		85,707	100.00
Source: Commission on Elections

=== Quezon's 2nd district ===
The seat was vacant after Mario Tagarao of Laban ng Demokratikong Pilipino (LDP) died on April 23, 1990. The LDP nominated two candidates: Marcial Punzalan Jr., who won the election, and Levi Soler.

Candidate	Party	Votes	%
Marcial Punzalan Jr.	Laban ng Demokratikong Pilipino	49,984	39.97
Levi Soler	Laban ng Demokratikong Pilipino	20,456	16.36
Potenciano Andaman	Lakas–NUCD	13,680	10.94
Clemente Alcala	Koalisyong Pambansa	13,374	10.69
Jazmin Enverga	Lakas–NUCD	10,816	8.65
Angel Tagarao	Nationalist People's Coalition	9,126	7.30
Romeo Alcala	Nacionalista Party	7,543	6.03
Jesus Rey Penarubia	Independent	89	0.07
Total		125,068	100.00
Source: Commission on Elections

=== Quezon's 3rd district ===
Incumbent Bienvenido Marquez Jr. of the Nationalist People's Coalition (NPC) ran for Governor of Quezon. The NPC nominated Danilo Suarez, who won the election.

Candidate	Party	Votes	%
Danilo Suarez	Nationalist People's Coalition	27,864	35.41
Raul Requesto	Koalisyong Pambansa	20,494	26.04
Rosauro Catarroja	Laban ng Demokratikong Pilipino	11,943	15.18
Godofredo Tan	Nacionalista Party	9,051	11.50
Mariano Morales Jr.	Lakas–NUCD	6,633	8.43
Armando Morales	People's Reform Party	1,892	2.40
Vicente Manosca	Kilusang Bagong Lipunan	814	1.03
Total		78,691	100.00
Source: Commission on Elections

=== Quezon's 4th district ===
Incumbent Oscar Santos of Koalisyong Pambansa ran for Governor of Quezon. Koalisyong Pambansa nominated Pedro Pujalte Jr., who was defeated by Manolet Lavides of Laban ng Demokratikong Pilipino.

Candidate	Party	Votes	%
Manolet Lavides	Laban ng Demokratikong Pilipino	51,352	52.39
Leovigildo Cerilla	Lakas–NUCD	30,224	30.84
Casiano Pasumbal Sr.	Nationalist People's Coalition	14,243	14.53
Robert Yap-Diangco	Independent	1,786	1.82
Pedro Pujalte Jr.	Koalisyong Pambansa	411	0.42
Total		98,016	100.00
Source: Commission on Elections

== Quezon City ==
=== Quezon City's 1st district ===
Incumbent Renato Yap of Laban ng Demokratikong Pilipino was re-elected to a second term.

Candidate	Party	Votes	%
Renato Yap (incumbent)	Laban ng Demokratikong Pilipino	72,693	46.49
Philip Juico	Lakas–NUCD	28,811	18.43
Nestor Borromeo	Independent	28,193	18.03
George Canseco	Nationalist People's Coalition	16,570	10.60
Nicanor Gatmaytan Jr.	Independent	3,924	2.51
Bienvenido Felix	Kilusang Bagong Lipunan	2,473	1.58
Vicente Bernabe	People's Reform Party	1,757	1.12
Julius Lozano	Koalisyong Pambansa	703	0.45
Manuel Santos	Nacionalista/Independent	596	0.38
Rolando Macasio	KBL/Independent	340	0.22
Antonio Hombrebueno	Nacionalista Party	236	0.15
Joan Gutierrez	Independent	56	0.04
Total		156,352	100.00
Source: Commission on Elections

=== Quezon City's 2nd district ===
Incumbent Antonio Aquino ran for a second term as an independent, but was defeated by Dante Liban of Laban ng Demokratikong Pilipino.

Candidate	Party	Votes	%
Dante Liban	Laban ng Demokratikong Pilipino	78,538	33.41
Antonio Aquino (incumbent)	Independent	51,809	22.04
James Torres	Nationalist People's Coalition	28,171	11.98
Oswaldo Carbonnell	Lakas–NUCD	26,692	11.35
Edgardo Serrano	People's Reform Party	24,183	10.29
Norberto Cabigao	Independent	18,382	7.82
Guillermo Rosales	Kilusang Bagong Lipunan	4,004	1.70
Primo Domingo	Kilusang Bagong Lipunan	1,743	0.74
Rebecca Espiritu	Nacionalista Party	1,047	0.45
Ronald Jeffrey Manulid	Independent	310	0.13
Edilberto Macasio	Kilusang Bagong Lipunan	147	0.06
Albert Babol	Independent	68	0.03
Total		235,094	100.00
Source: Commission on Elections

=== Quezon City's 3rd district ===
Incumbent Nikki Coseteng of the Nationalist People's Coalition (NPC) ran for the Senate. The NPC nominated Jose Paculdo, who lost the election to Dennis Roldan of Laban ng Demokratikong Pilipino.

Candidate	Party	Votes	%
Dennis Roldan	Laban ng Demokratikong Pilipino	28,943	25.89
Jorge Banal	Independent	21,627	19.34
Edward Buenaflor	Lakas–NUCD	17,870	15.98
Jose Paculdo	Nationalist People's Coalition	15,559	13.92
Bonifacio Alentajan	Nacionalista Party	9,164	8.20
Sebastian Arrastia	Independent	5,235	4.68
Jose Luiz Alcuaz	People's Reform Party	4,348	3.89
Michael Say	Partido ng Masang Pilipino	4,304	3.85
Ricardo Penson	Koalisyong Pambansa	3,237	2.90
Federico Liban	Lakas–NUCD	637	0.57
Justo Antonio	Kilusang Bagong Lipunan	574	0.51
Victor Nepomuceno	Koalisyong Pambansa	310	0.28
Total		111,808	100.00
Source: Commission on Elections

=== Quezon City's 4th district ===
Incumbent Mel Mathay of Laban ng Demokratikong Pilipino (LDP) ran for Mayor of Quezon City. The LDP nominated Kiko Pangilinan, who was defeated by independent candidate Feliciano Belmonte Jr..

Candidate	Party	Votes	%
Feliciano Belmonte Jr.	Independent	78,697	52.31
Kiko Pangilinan	Laban ng Demokratikong Pilipino	62,856	41.78
Reynaldo Santos	People's Reform Party	5,099	3.39
Edward Balanag	Nationalist People's Coalition	1,378	0.92
Marlito Altuna	Nacionalista/PCP	1,299	0.86
Ricardo Raagas	Independent	573	0.38
Philip Camins	Kilusang Bagong Lipunan	467	0.31
Freddie Chuago	Lakas–NUCD/UMDP	51	0.03
Edmundo Paglinawan	Koalisyong Pambansa	13	0.01
Amalia Muhlach	Independent	1	0.00
Ramon Rodrigo	Independent	0	0.00
Total		150,434	100.00
Source: Commission on Elections

== Quirino ==
Incumbent Junie Cua of Laban ng Demokratikong Pilipino was re-elected to a second term.

Candidate	Party	Votes	%
Junie Cua (incumbent)	Laban ng Demokratikong Pilipino	31,466	69.54
David Longid	Independent	10,469	23.14
Ernesto Salun-at	Nacionalista/Koalisyong Pambansa	2,525	5.58
Arnold Agullana	Kilusang Bagong Lipunan	789	1.74
Total		45,249	100.00
Source: Commission on Elections

== Rizal ==
=== Rizal's 1st district ===
Incumbent Francisco Sumulong of Lakas–NUCD ran for the Senate. Lakas–NUCD, in coalition with the Union of Muslim Democrats, nominated Severino Sumulong, who was defeated by Manuel Sanchez of Koalisyong Pambansa.

Candidate	Party	Votes	%
Manuel Sanchez	Koalisyong Pambansa	61,707	31.92
Jose Hernandez	Nationalist People's Coalition	43,560	22.53
Severino Sumulong	Lakas–NUCD/UMDP	41,880	21.66
Wilfredo Naval	People's Reform Party	19,141	9.90
Remedios Paralejas	Nacionalista/KBL	13,556	7.01
Edwin Cuenco	Partido ng Masang Pilipino	13,281	6.87
Gilbert Saladaga	Independent	212	0.11
Total		193,337	100.00
Source: Commission on Elections

=== Rizal's 2nd district ===
Incumbent Emigdio Tanjuatco Jr. of Laban ng Demokratikong Pilipino was re-elected to a second term.

Candidate	Party	Votes	%
Emigdio Tanjuatco Jr. (incumbent)	Laban ng Demokratikong Pilipino	60,687	48.17
Nemesio Roxas	Independent	30,135	23.92
Francisco Guillermo	Nacionalista Party	24,073	19.11
Julian Maronilla	Nationalist People's Coalition	11,022	8.75
Lemuel Tarucan	Independent	70	0.06
Total		125,987	100.00
Source: Commission on Elections

== Romblon ==
Incumbent Natalio Beltran Jr. of Laban ng Demokratikong Pilipino ran for a second term, but was defeated by Eleandro Jesus Madrona of Lakas–NUCD.

Candidate	Party	Votes	%
Eleandro Jesus Madrona	Lakas–NUCD	34,620	50.91
Natalio Beltran Jr. (incumbent)	Laban ng Demokratikong Pilipino	32,240	47.41
Tereso Tarrosa	Kilusang Bagong Lipunan	1,118	1.64
Domingo Macasio	PRP/KBL	12	0.02
Woodrow Yap	Independent	11	0.02
Total		68,001	100.00
Source: Commission on Elections

== Samar ==
=== Samar's 1st district ===
Incumbent Jose Roño of the Nacionalista Party ran for a second term, but was defeated by Rodolfo Tuazon of Laban ng Demokratikong Pilipino.

Candidate	Party	Votes	%
Rodolfo Tuazon	Laban ng Demokratikong Pilipino	38,001	57.31
Jose Roño (incumbent)	Nacionalista Party	27,230	41.07
Artemio Apostol	Lakas–NUCD	566	0.85
Henry Puyat	Koalisyong Pambansa	328	0.49
Fernando Perito	Nacionalista Party	180	0.27
Total		66,305	100.00
Source: Commission on Elections

=== Samar's 2nd district ===
Incumbent Venancio Garduce of Laban ng Demokratikong Pilipino ran for a second term, but was defeated by Catalino Figueroa of Koalisyong Pambansa.

Candidate	Party	Votes	%
Catalino Figueroa	Koalisyong Pambansa	21,721	26.51
Antonio Nachura	Lakas–NUCD	18,500	22.58
Venancio Garduce (incumbent)	Laban ng Demokratikong Pilipino	17,984	21.95
Tomas Ricalde	Nacionalista Party	11,259	13.74
Leopoldo Romano	Nationalist People's Coalition	10,381	12.67
Hermogenes Teves	Lakas–NUCD	1,597	1.95
Felicisimo Ilagan	Kilusang Bagong Lipunan	504	0.62
Total		81,946	100.00
Source: Commission on Elections

== San Juan–Mandaluyong ==
Incumbent Ronaldo Zamora of Laban ng Demokratikong Pilipino was re-elected to a second term.

Candidate	Party	Votes	%
Ronaldo Zamora (incumbent)	Laban ng Demokratikong Pilipino	73,295	48.56
Jose Mari Gonzales	Lakas–NUCD	70,703	46.84
Josue San Pedro	Nacionalista Party	5,032	3.33
Pastor Lim	PRP/KBL	646	0.43
Rogelio Villar	Independent	442	0.29
Crisanto Flores	Kilusang Bagong Lipunan	410	0.27
Sim Carbonell Jr.	Partido Sambayanang Pilipino	208	0.14
Jesus Viray	Emancipated Scientists Party	202	0.13
Total		150,938	100.00
Source: Commission on Elections

== Siquijor ==
Incumbent Orlando Fua of Laban ng Demokratikong Pilipino was re-elected to a second term.

Candidate	Party	Votes	%
Orlando Fua (incumbent)	Laban ng Demokratikong Pilipino	16,830	51.53
Fidelito Avanzado	Nationalist People's Coalition	14,708	45.03
Celso Largo	Lakas–NUCD	1,121	3.43
Fernando Suan	Nacionalista Party	2	0.01
Total		32,661	100.00
Source: Commission on Elections

== Sorsogon ==
=== Sorsogon's 1st district ===
Incumbent Salvador Escudero of the Nationalist People's Coalition was re-elected to a second term.

Candidate	Party	Votes	%
Salvador Escudero (incumbent)	Nationalist People's Coalition	30,352	38.99
Elizalde Diaz	Koalisyong Pambansa	23,737	30.49
Rafael Aquino	Lakas–NUCD	13,709	17.61
Antonio Huab	Laban ng Demokratikong Pilipino	9,172	11.78
Silverio Berenguer	Lakas–NUCD	808	1.04
Pedro Salazar	Koalisyong Pambansa/KBL	62	0.08
Total		77,840	100.00
Source: Commission on Elections

=== Sorsogon's 2nd district ===
Incumbent Bonifacio Gillego of Lakas–NUCD was re-elected to a second term.

Candidate	Party	Votes	%
Bonifacio Gillego (incumbent)	Lakas–NUCD	29,949	36.53
Jose Sabater	Nationalist People's Coalition	24,590	29.99
Mario Talatala	Laban ng Demokratikong Pilipino	23,697	28.91
Samson Divina	Nacionalista Party	2,157	2.63
Conrado Lee	Kilusang Bagong Lipunan	758	0.92
Mario Estayan	Koalisyong Pambansa	544	0.66
Manuel Fulgar	Kilusang Bagong Lipunan	286	0.35
Total		81,981	100.00
Source: Commission on Elections

== South Cotabato ==
=== South Cotabato's 1st district ===
Incumbent Adelbert Antonino of Laban ng Demokratikong Pilipino (LDP) retired. The LDP nominated Luwalhati Antonino, who won the election.

Candidate	Party	Votes	%
Luwalhati Antonino	Laban ng Demokratikong Pilipino	48,965	39.74
Dominador Lagare	Koalisyong Pambansa	22,193	18.01
Rogelio Garcia	Lakas–NUCD	17,862	14.50
Miguel Odi Jr.	Lakas–NUCD	17,487	14.19
Rufino Banas	Nacionalista Party	9,481	7.70
Teodulo Ramirez	Partido ng Masang Pilipino	7,091	5.76
Teodulo Garay Jr.	Independent	126	0.10
Total		123,205	100.00
Source: Commission on Elections

=== South Cotabato's 2nd district ===
Incumbent Hilario de Pedro III of Laban ng Demokratikong Pilipino (LDP) retired to run for Governor of South Cotabato. The LDP nominated Ernesto Catedral, who was defeated by Daisy Avance Fuentes of Koalisyong Pambansa and the Nationalist People's Coalition.

Candidate	Party	Votes	%
Daisy Avance Fuentes	Koalisyong Pambansa/NPC	31,400	28.42
Ernesto Catedral	Laban ng Demokratikong Pilipino	23,604	21.36
Gregorio Limpin Jr.	Lakas–NUCD/UMDP	14,774	13.37
Jose Sison Jr.	Kilusang Bagong Lipunan	12,976	11.75
Rodolfo Aguilar	Partido ng Masang Pilipino	10,483	9.49
Benjamin Garcia	Independent	5,808	5.26
Felixberto Perbillo	AIM/Independent	5,769	5.22
Augustus Velarde	Nacionalista/Koalisyong Pambansa	5,666	5.13
Total		110,480	100.00
Source: Commission on Elections

=== South Cotabato's 3rd district ===
Incumbent James Chiongbian of Laban ng Demokratikong Pilipino was re-elected to a second term.

Candidate	Party	Votes	%
James Chiongbian (incumbent)	Laban ng Demokratikong Pilipino	43,262	71.82
Thomas Hofer	Koalisyong Pambansa	16,973	28.18
Total		60,235	100.00
Source: Commission on Elections

== Southern Leyte ==
The incumbent was Roger Mercado of Laban ng Demokratikong Pilipino (LDP), but was removed by the Supreme Court on October 15, 1991, after losing an electoral protest to Rosette Lerias of Kilusang Bagong Lipunan (KBL). Lerias took office on December 4, 1991.

Lerias ran for a second term as the candidate of the KBL and the Nationalist People's Coalition, but was defeated by Mercado.

Candidate	Party	Votes	%
Roger Mercado	Laban ng Demokratikong Pilipino	60,919	54.16
Rosette Lerias (incumbent)	KBL/NPC	46,220	41.09
Ernesto Labastida Jr.	Lakas–NUCD	5,304	4.72
Raul Duarte	Kilusang Bagong Lipunan	38	0.03
Total		112,481	100.00
Source: Commission on Elections

== Sultan Kudarat ==
Incumbent Estanislao Valdez of Laban ng Demokratikong Pilipino was re-elected to a second term.

Candidate	Party	Votes	%
Estanislao Valdez (incumbent)	Laban ng Demokratikong Pilipino	43,983	48.52
Aurelio Freires Jr.	KBL/Nacionalista	25,339	27.95
Jose Baroquillo Jr.	Nationalist People's Coalition	11,206	12.36
Camilo Dionio Jr.	Lakas–NUCD	6,654	7.34
Sonny Dequina	People's Reform Party	3,475	3.83
Total		90,657	100.00
Source: Commission on Elections

== Sulu ==
=== Sulu's 1st district ===
Incumbent Abdusakur Mahail Tan of Lakas–NUCD ran for Governor of Sulu. Lakas–NUCD nominated Bensaudi Tulawie, who won the election.

Candidate	Party	Votes	%
Bensaudi Tulawie	Lakas–NUCD	43,268	50.36
Hadji Hussin Loong	Laban ng Demokratikong Pilipino	35,734	41.59
Hashim Abubakar	Nationalist People's Coalition	4,513	5.25
Hadju Abdulmoin Lakibul	Kilusang Bagong Lipunan	1,943	2.26
Hanjada Radiate	Kilusang Bagong Lipunan	275	0.32
Abdulpatta Hadjibun	Partido ng Masang Pilipino	101	0.12
Willy Walli	Kilusang Bagong Lipunan	77	0.09
Total		85,911	100.00
Source: Commission on Elections

=== Sulu's 2nd district ===
Incumbent Arden Anni of Lakas–NUCD ran for a second term, but was defeated by Asani Tammang of Laban ng Demokratikong Pilipino.

Candidate	Party	Votes	%
Asani Tammang	Laban ng Demokratikong Pilipino	37,694	62.05
Arden Anni (incumbent)	Lakas–NUCD	21,489	35.38
Hadji Lajud Estino	Kilusang Bagong Lipunan	1,001	1.65
Yurkin Tanan	Kilusang Bagong Lipunan	303	0.50
Haj. Abdulhan Arabani	Partido ng Masang Pilipino	145	0.24
Sharifa Nurmini Sahipa	Kilusang Bagong Lipunan	114	0.19
Total		60,746	100.00
Source: Commission on Elections

== Surigao del Norte ==
=== Surigao del Norte's 1st district ===
Incumbent Glenda Ecleo of Laban ng Demokratikong Pilipino was re-elected to a second term.

Candidate	Party	Votes	%
Glenda Ecleo (incumbent)	Laban ng Demokratikong Pilipino	33,239	58.61
Cesar Navarro	Nationalist People's Coalition	15,157	26.72
Manuel Coro	Lakas–NUCD	7,731	13.63
Joel Pelicano	Nacionalista Party	588	1.04
Total		56,715	100.00
Source: Commission on Elections

=== Surigao del Norte's 2nd district ===
Incumbent Constantino Navarro of Kilusang Bagong Lipunan retired. Robert Barbers of the Nacionalista Party won the election.

Candidate	Party	Votes	%
Robert Barbers	Nacionalista Party	24,770	30.84
Jose Sering	Nationalist People's Coalition	21,667	26.97
Constantino Navarro Jr.	Lakas–NUCD/PCP	13,458	16.75
Vidal Reyes Jr.	Koalisyong Pambansa	7,527	9.37
Thelmo Dumadag	Lakas–NUCD	6,467	8.05
Vitaliano Sabalo	Koalisyong Pambansa	6,380	7.94
Anatalio Luib	Pag-asa ng Bansa	61	0.08
Total		80,330	100.00
Source: Commission on Elections

== Surigao del Sur ==
=== Surigao del Sur's 1st district ===
Incumbent Mario Ty of Laban ng Demokratikong Pilipino was re-elected to a second term.

Candidate	Party	Votes	%
Mario Ty (incumbent)	Laban ng Demokratikong Pilipino	32,300	43.08
Mateo Tan	Nacionalista Party	24,695	32.94
Nabor Zafra	Lakas–NUCD	6,791	9.06
Enato Solera	Nationalist People's Coalition	4,957	6.61
Leopoldo Rivas	Koalisyong Pambansa	4,906	6.54
Emiliano Murillo	Emancipated Scientists Party	1,327	1.77
Total		74,976	100.00
Source: Commission on Elections

=== Surigao del Sur's 2nd district ===
Incumbent Ernesto Estrella of Laban ng Demokratikong Pilipino was re-elected to a second term.

Candidate	Party	Votes	%
Ernesto Estrella (incumbent)	Laban ng Demokratikong Pilipino	23,445	35.84
Roberto Dormendo	Nationalist People's Coalition	12,977	19.84
Paterno Guasa	Lakas–NUCD	9,209	14.08
Mamerto Alciso Jr.	Koalisyong Pambansa	8,746	13.37
Wilfredo Babano	Nacionalista Party	7,261	11.10
Osias Verano	Independent	2,726	4.17
Rosita Gumatas	Kilusang Bagong Lipunan	1,057	1.62
Total		65,421	100.00
Source: Commission on Elections

== Taguig–Pateros ==
Incumbent Dante Tiñga of Laban ng Demokratikong Pilipino was re-elected to a second term.

Candidate	Party	Votes	%
Dante Tiñga (incumbent)	Laban ng Demokratikong Pilipino	46,080	46.64
Isidro Garcia	Koalisyong Pambansa	38,757	39.23
Jaime dela Rosa	Lakas–NUCD	10,897	11.03
Edwin Flores	Nacionalista Party	2,214	2.24
Faustino Ignacio	Kilusang Bagong Lipunan	646	0.65
Mario Cruz	Independent	193	0.20
Serafin Amore	Emancipated Scientists Party	7	0.01
Total		98,794	100.00
Source: Commission on Elections

== Tarlac ==
=== Tarlac's 1st district ===
Incumbent Peping Cojuangco of Laban ng Demokratikong Pilipino was re-elected to a second term.

Candidate	Party	Votes	%
Peping Cojuangco (incumbent)	Laban ng Demokratikong Pilipino	73,388	65.21
Mercedes Teodoro	Nationalist People's Coalition	39,148	34.79
Total		112,536	100.00
Source: Commission on Elections

=== Tarlac's 2nd district ===
Incumbent Jose Yap of Laban ng Demokratikong Pilipino was re-elected to a second term.

Candidate	Party	Votes	%
Jose Yap (incumbent)	Laban ng Demokratikong Pilipino	82,343	73.42
Lino David	Nationalist People's Coalition	24,356	21.72
Antonio Agustin	People's Reform Party	4,102	3.66
Richard Beltran	Lakas–NUCD	1,091	0.97
Trinidad Tabunar	LDP/Independent	160	0.14
Virgilio Ilagan	Independent	105	0.09
Total		112,157	100.00
Source: Commission on Elections

=== Tarlac's 3rd district ===
Incumbent Herminio Aquino of Laban ng Demokratikong Pilipino was re-elected to a second term.

Candidate	Party	Votes	%
Herminio Aquino (incumbent)	Laban ng Demokratikong Pilipino	25,680	34.60
Feliciano Jose	Koalisyong Pambansa	17,001	22.90
Juanito Tizon	Nationalist People's Coalition	16,067	21.65
Arnaldo Dizon	Nacionalista Party	15,478	20.85
Total		74,226	100.00
Source: Commission on Elections

== Tawi-Tawi ==
Incumbent Romulo Espaldon ran for a second term as the candidate of Lakas–NUCD and the Union of Muslim Democrats, but was defeated by Nur Jaafar of Laban ng Demokratikong Pilipino.

Candidate	Party	Votes	%
Nur Jaafar	Laban ng Demokratikong Pilipino	20,457	34.27
Alawadin Bandon Jr.	Partido ng Masang Pilipino	15,331	25.68
Romulo Espaldon (incumbent)	Lakas–NUCD/UMDP	12,065	20.21
Edgar Lim	Kilusang Bagong Lipunan	7,092	11.88
Amirbahal Aluk	Laban ng Demokratikong Pilipino	2,658	4.45
Ismael Itum	Nationalist People's Coalition	1,826	3.06
Hadji Nazher Iya	Kilusang Bagong Lipunan	265	0.44
Total		59,694	100.00
Source: Commission on Elections

== Valenzuela ==
Incumbent Antonio Serapio of the Nationalist People's Coalition was re-elected to a second term.

Candidate	Party	Votes	%
Antonio Serapio (incumbent)	Nationalist People's Coalition	43,026	40.97
Geronimo Angeles	Laban ng Demokratikong Pilipino	29,553	28.14
Ricardo Valmonte	Lakas–NUCD	22,283	21.22
Arturo Samonte	Koalisyong Pambansa	5,441	5.18
Melencio Cea	Nacionalista Party	2,098	2.00
Ciriaco Cea	People's Reform Party	1,130	1.08
Paulino Gutierrez Jr.	Kilusang Bagong Lipunan	841	0.80
Emiliano Dizon	People's Reform Party	413	0.39
Nenita Gallarde	Kilusang Bagong Lipunan	232	0.22
Total		105,017	100.00
Source: Commission on Elections

== Zambales ==
=== Zambales' 1st district ===
Incumbent Katherine Gordon was re-elected to a second term as the candidate of the Nationalist People's Coalition and the Nacionalista Party.

Candidate	Party	Votes	%
Katherine Gordon (incumbent)	NPC/Nacionalista	86,889	72.58
Estanislao Cesa Jr.	Lakas–NUCD	32,821	27.42
Total		119,710	100.00
Source: Commission on Elections

=== Zambales' 2nd district ===
Incumbent Pacita Gonzales ran for a second term as the candidate of Laban ng Demokratikong Pilipino and the Nacionalista Party, but was defeated by Antonio Diaz of Lakas–NUCD.

Candidate	Party	Votes	%
Antonio Diaz	Lakas–NUCD	39,716	46.09
Pacita Gonzales (incumbent)	LDP/Nacionalista	27,721	32.17
Lino David	Nationalist People's Coalition	18,742	21.75
Total		86,179	100.00
Source: Commission on Elections

== Zamboanga City ==
Incumbent Maria Clara Lobregat of Laban ng Demokratikong Pilipino was re-elected to a second term.

Candidate	Party	Votes	%
Maria Clara Lobregat (incumbent)	Laban ng Demokratikong Pilipino	57,008	48.49
Armando Lopez Jr.	Lakas–NUCD	37,927	32.26
Jose Vicente Atilano II	Nationalist People's Coalition	17,421	14.82
Erwin Cesar Climaco	CCG	2,666	2.27
Taib Abdurahman	Kilusang Bagong Lipunan	2,548	2.17
Total		117,570	100.00
Source: Commission on Elections

== Zamboanga del Norte ==
=== Zamboanga del Norte's 1st district ===
Incumbent Artemio Adasa Jr. of Lakas–NUCD was re-elected to a second term.

Candidate	Party	Votes	%
Artemio Adasa Jr. (incumbent)	Lakas–NUCD	32,585	51.63
Romeo Jalosjos Sr.	Nationalist People's Coalition	29,127	46.15
Francisco Geronilla	People's Reform Party	1,243	1.97
Lorenzo Villanueva Jr.	Koalisyong Pambansa	121	0.19
Manuel Sumbilon	Koalisyong Pambansa/Lakas–NUCD/PCP	35	0.06
Total		63,111	100.00
Source: Commission on Elections

=== Zamboanga del Norte's 2nd district ===
Incumbent Ernesto Amatong of Koalisyong Pambansa was re-elected to a second term.

Candidate	Party	Votes	%
Ernesto Amatong (incumbent)	Koalisyong Pambansa	35,774	45.00
Uldarico Mejorada	Nationalist People's Coalition	24,594	30.94
Mariano Macias	Laban ng Demokratikong Pilipino	16,916	21.28
Cesar Esturco	Lakas–NUCD/UMDP	2,196	2.76
Cresencio Hisolar	Realist/Independent	19	0.02
Total		79,499	100.00
Source: Commission on Elections

=== Zamboanga del Norte's 3rd district ===
Incumbent Angel Carloto of Laban ng Demokratikong Pilipino was re-elected to a second term.

Candidate	Party	Votes	%
Angel Carloto (incumbent)	Laban ng Demokratikong Pilipino	26,538	41.04
Jaime Lim	Lakas–NUCD	24,919	38.54
Florentino Daarol	Nationalist People's Coalition	12,835	19.85
Averell Pia	Kilusang Bagong Lipunan	368	0.57
Total		64,660	100.00
Source: Commission on Elections

== Zamboanga del Sur ==
=== Zamboanga del Sur's 1st district ===
Incumbent Isidoro Real Jr. of Lakas–NUCD ran for Governor of Zamboanga del Sur. Lakas–NUCD nominated Alejandro Urro, who won the election.

Candidate	Party	Votes	%
Alejandro Urro	Lakas–NUCD	63,226	62.71
Pelagio Estopia	Laban ng Demokratikong Pilipino	18,451	18.30
Jorge Almonte	Nationalist People's Coalition	15,228	15.10
Josue Campomanes	Kilusang Bagong Lipunan	2,172	2.15
Alfredo Galcinao	Koalisyong Pambansa	1,076	1.07
Rufino Cadelinia	Nacionalista Party	630	0.62
Ramon Llaguno Jr.	Nacionalista Party	44	0.04
Total		100,827	100.00
Source: Commission on Elections

=== Zamboanga del Sur's 2nd district ===
Incumbent Antonio Cerilles of the Nationalist People's Coalition was re-elected to a second term.

Candidate	Party	Votes	%
Antonio Cerilles (incumbent)	Nationalist People's Coalition	35,310	51.24
Baldomero Fernandez	Lakas–NUCD	22,014	31.95
Luis Bersales Jr.	Laban ng Demokratikong Pilipino	11,587	16.81
Total		68,911	100.00
Source: Commission on Elections

=== Zamboanga del Sur's 3rd district ===
Incumbent Wilfredo Cainglet of Laban ng Demokratikong Pilipino ran a second term, but was defeated by Belma Cabilao of Lakas–NUCD.

Candidate	Party	Votes	%
Belma Cabilao	Lakas–NUCD	37,759	41.08
Wilfredo Cainglet (incumbent)	Laban ng Demokratikong Pilipino	35,399	38.51
Marcial Empleo	Nationalist People's Coalition	17,535	19.08
Ali Salihuddin	Partido ng Masang Pilipino	1,228	1.34
Total		91,921	100.00
Source: Commission on Elections
