= 1967 Philippine House of Representatives special elections =

- November 14, 1967

5 of 108 seats in the House of Representatives of the Philippines
| | Majority party | Minority party | Third party |
|---|---|---|---|
| Party | Nacionalista | Liberal | Nacionalista (ind.) |
| Seats won | 5 | 0 | 0 |
| Popular vote | 144,093 | 33,424 | 25,122 |
| Percentage | 68.68 | 15.93 | 11.97 |

Five special elections (known as "by-elections" elsewhere) to the House of Representatives of the Philippines, the lower house of the Congress of the Philippines, were held on November 14, 1967, along with the 1967 Philippine Senate election and the 1967 Philippine constitutional plebiscite. These were for vacancies in the 6th Congress of the Philippines; the winners were to serve the rest of the term, which had ended on December 30, 1969. Political parties were allowed to field multiple candidates per district; the Nacionalista Party won in all districts, mirroring their victory in the Senate election where they won six of the eight seats up.

These were the last special elections until the proclamation of martial law by president Ferdinand Marcos in 1972. The next such special elections are to be in 1993, or seven years after Marcos was overthrown after the People Power Revolution.

== Electoral system ==
All seats in the House of Representatives were elected from single member districts, under the first-past-the-post voting system. Under the Revised Election Code, when a seat becomes vacant prior to ten months before the general election, the president, as soon as he is notified by the chamber where the vacancy occurred, shall call a special election.

The following seats were up for election

- Davao del Sur's at-large district
- Davao Oriental's at-large district
- Ilocos Norte's 1st district
- Northern Samar's at-large district
- South Cotabato's at-large district

== Background ==
In the cases of the special elections in Davao del Sur and Davao Oriental, it was due to the creation of these new provinces from the original Davao province. The congressman from the old Davao's at-large congressional district was free to choose which province he'd continue as an incumbent on. Lorenzo Sarmiento chose to continue at Davao del Norte, another newly created province, necessitating special elections in the other two provinces.

In South Cotabato, the law creating that province specified that the incumbent congressman of Cotabato's at-large congressional district (Salipada Pendatun) shall continue to serve as congressman of the original Cotabato province.

In Ilocos Norte, incumbent Antonio Raquiza was appointed Secretary of Public Works, while in Northern Samar, incumbent Eladio Balite died in office, leaving both seats vacant.

== Special elections ==
| Party | Votes | % | Seats |
|---|---|---|---|
| Nacionalista Party | 144,093 | 68.68 | 5 |
| Liberal Party | 33,424 | 15.93 | 0 |
| Nacionalista Party (independent) | 25,122 | 11.97 | 0 |
| No party indicated | 53 | 0.03 | 0 |
| Independent | 7,111 | 3.39 | 0 |
| Total | 209,803 | 100.00 | 5 |

=== Davao del Sur ===
Davao del Sur was one of the provinces created from the division of the original Davao province.

The governor of undivided Davao province, Alejandro Almendras, supported Artemio Loyola, then switched his support to Vicente Duterte. Duterte was then Secretary of General Services, had previously served as governor of Davao, and wanted to revive his political career, but was defeated by Loyola. Duterte died in 1968.

1967 Davao del Sur's at-large congressional district special election
| Candidate | Party | Votes | % |
|---|---|---|---|
| Artemio Loyola | Nacionalista Party | 32,096 | 56.09 |
| Vicente Duterte | Nacionalista Party (independent) | 23,922 | 41.81 |
| Celestino Cortes | Nacionalista Party (independent) | 1,200 | 2.10 |
| Total | | 57,218 | 100.00 |
| Majority | | 8,174 | 14.29 |
| Nacionalista Party win (new seat) | | | |
Source: COMELEC

Loyola remained House representative until the declaration of martial law in 1972.

=== Davao Oriental ===
Davao Oriental was one of the provinces created from the division of the original Davao province.

1967 Davao Oriental's at-large congressional district special election
| Candidate | Party | Votes | % |
|---|---|---|---|
| Constancio Maglana | Nacionalista Party | 18,512 | 78.83 |
| Galileo Sibala | Liberal Party | 4,385 | 18.67 |
| Carlos Ilustre | Nacionalista Party | 587 | 2.50 |
| Total | | 23,484 | 100.00 |
| Majority | | 14,127 | 60.16 |
| Nacionalista Party win (new seat) | | | |
Source: COMELEC

Maglana remained House representative until the declaration of martial law in 1972.

=== Ilocos Norte's 1st district ===
Incumbent Antonio Raquiza was appointed Secretary of Public Works on August 24, 1966. Ilocos Norte Provincial Board Member Roque Ablan Jr. was elected to replace Raquiza in the special election.

1967 Ilocos Norte's 1st congressional district special election
| Candidate | Party | Votes | % |
|---|---|---|---|
| Roque Ablan Jr. | Nacionalista Party | 23,500 | 77.32 |
| Perfecto Llacar | Liberal Party | 4,501 | 14.81 |
| Arturo Romero | Liberal Party | 2,391 | 7.87 |
| Total | | 30,392 | 100.00 |
| Majority | | 18,999 | 62.51 |
| Nacionalista Party gain from Liberal Party | | | |
Source: COMELEC

Ablan remained House representative until the declaration of martial law in 1972. Ablan retook the district once it was recreated in 1987, and served until 1998 when he was term-limited. Ablan was elected again in 2001 and served until 2010.

=== Northern Samar ===
Incumbent Eladio Balite died in office on August 24, 1967. Balite himself entered Congress by winning a special election in 1955 for Samar's 1st congressional district, most of which would later become Northern Samar.

1967 Northern Samar's at-large congressional district special election
| Candidate | Party | Votes | % |
|---|---|---|---|
| Eusebio Moore | Nacionalista Party | 18,064 | 46.91 |
| Raul Daza | Nacionalista Party | 12,110 | 31.45 |
| Macario Vicencio | Liberal Party | 8,099 | 21.03 |
| Jose Peña | Nacionalista Party | 233 | 0.61 |
| Total | | 38,506 | 100.00 |
| Majority | | 5,954 | 15.46 |
| Nacionalista Party gain from Liberal Party | | | |
Source: COMELEC

Moore was defeated by Daza in the 1969 regular election, who then remained House representative until the declaration of martial law in 1972.

=== South Cotabato ===
South Cotabato was created from the division of the original Cotabato province.

1967 South Cotabato's at-large congressional district special election
| Candidate | Party | Votes | % |
|---|---|---|---|
| James Chiongbian | Nacionalista Party | 22,962 | 38.14 |
| Hilario De Pedro | Nacionalista Party | 16,029 | 26.62 |
| Cornelio Falgui | Liberal Party | 14,048 | 23.33 |
| Rufino Malunjao Sr. | Independent | 5,003 | 8.31 |
| Jesus Quintillian | Independent | 2,108 | 3.50 |
| Dominador Soriano | (Note: Party affiliation not indicated in certificate of candidacy) | 53 | 0.09 |
| Mauro Tudio | Liberal Party | 0 | 0.00 |
| Total | | 60,203 | 100.00 |
| Majority | | 6,933 | 11.52 |
| Nacionalista Party win (new seat) | | | |
Source: COMELEC

Among the elections on this day, this district had the smallest margin, percentage-wise. Chiongbian remained House representative until the declaration of martial law in 1972, and after Congress was restored in 1987, he continued to serve as representative for South Cotabato's 3rd congressional district from 1987 to 1995 and for the new province of Sarangani's lone district from 1995 to 1998.
