= South Cotabato's at-large congressional district =

Legislative district of the Philippines

South Cotabato's at-large congressional district is a defunct congressional district that encompassed the entire province of South Cotabato in the Philippines. It was represented in the House of Representatives from 1967 to 1972 and in the Batasang Pambansa from 1984 to 1986. The province of South Cotabato was created as a result of the partition of Cotabato in 1966 and elected its first representative provincewide at-large during the Philippine House of Representatives special election of November 14, 1967. It covered the combined territories of the present-day South Cotabato and Sarangani provinces including the now-independent city of General Santos. The district remained a single-member district until the dissolution of the lower house in 1972. It was later absorbed by the multi-member Region XI's at-large district for the national parliament in 1978. In 1984, provincial and city representations were restored and South Cotabato elected three members for the regular parliament. The district was abolished following the 1987 reapportionment to establish three districts in the province under a new constitution.

== Representation history ==
#	Term of office		Congress	Single seat											
#	Start	End	Congress	Image	Member	Party	Electoral history								
=== South Cotabato's at-large district for the House of Representatives of the Philippines ===
District created July 18, 1966 from Cotabato's at-large district.
1	January 22, 1968	September 23, 1972	6th		James Chiongbian	Nacionalista	Elected in 1967 special election. Oath taking deferred.								
1	January 22, 1968	September 23, 1972	7th		James Chiongbian	Nacionalista	Re-elected in 1969. Removed from office after imposition of martial law.								
District dissolved into the ten-seat Region XI's at-large district for the Interim Batasang Pambansa.
#	Term of office		Batasang Pambansa	Seat A				Seat B				Seat C			
#	Start	End	Batasang Pambansa	Image	Member	Party	Electoral history	Image	Member	Party	Electoral history	Image	Member	Party	Electoral history
=== South Cotabato's at-large district for the Regular Batasang Pambansa ===
District re-created February 1, 1984.
–	July 23, 1984	March 25, 1986	2nd		Rufino B. Bañas	UNIDO	Elected in 1984.		Rogelio Garcia	UNIDO	Elected in 1984.		Hilario B. de Pedro	UNIDO	Elected in 1984.
District dissolved into South Cotabato's 1st, 2nd and 3rd districts.

== See also ==
- Legislative districts of South Cotabato
