= James Chiongbian =

Filipino politician (1921–2004)

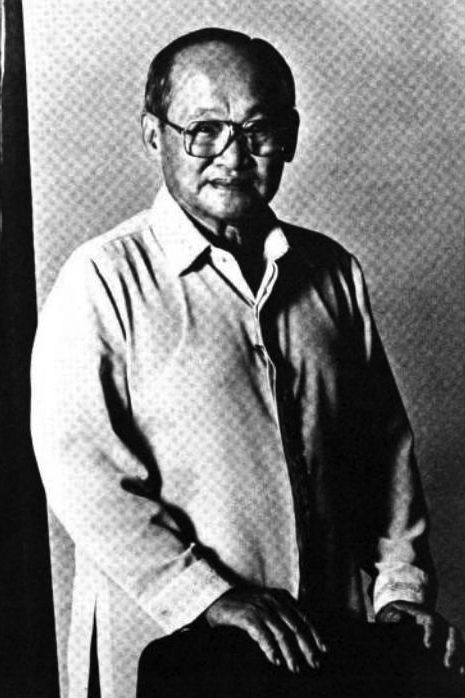
- Chiongbian's official portrait during the 8th Congress

Member of the Philippine House of Representatives
- In office June 30, 1995 – June 30, 1998
- Preceded by: District established
- Succeeded by: Erwin Chiongbian
- Constituency: Sarangani's at-large district
- In office June 30, 1987 – June 30, 1995
- Preceded by: District established
- Succeeded by: District abolished (seat later held by Dibu Tuan in 2025)
- Constituency: South Cotabato's 3rd district
- In office January 22, 1968 – January 17, 1973
- Preceded by: District established
- Succeeded by: District abolished (seat later held by Rufino Bañas, Rogelio Garcia and Hilario de Pedro in 1984)
- Constituency: South Cotabato's at-large district

Personal details
- Born: October 7, 1921 Oroquieta, Misamis Occidental, Philippine Islands
- Died: 2004 (aged 82–83)
- Party: Lakas (1991–2004)
- Other political affiliations: LDP (1988–1991); LnB (1987–1988); Nacionalista (1967–1973)
- Spouse: Priscilla Lopong
- Children: 4, including Erwin
- Relatives: William Chiongbian (brother)
- Education: Silliman University; Mapua Institute of Technology (BS)

James Lee Chiongbian (October 7, 1921 – c. 2004) was a Filipino businessman and politician who served as the representative for Sarangani's at-large congressional district in the Philippine House of Representatives from 1995 to 1998. He previously represented South Cotabato's 3rd district from 1987 to 1995 and South Cotabato's at-large district from 1968 to 1973.

Chiongbian is known as the "Father of Sarangani" for authoring Republic Act No. 7228, which established Sarangani as a province.

== Early life and education ==
James Lee Chiongbian was born on October 7, 1921, in Oroquieta, Misamis Occidental, to Victoriano Chiongbian and Rosario Lee. He attended Silliman University for his primary and secondary education and later graduated with a degree in engineering from the Mapua Institute of Technology.

== Early career ==
Chiongbian founded the shipping company Eastern Shipping Lines in 1957 and served as its president.

== House of Representatives ==
In the 1967 special elections to the House of Representatives, Chiongbian successfully ran under the Nacionalista Party for the seat representing South Cotabato's newly created at-large congressional district. He served in the 7th Congress but was unable to complete his four-year term after Congress was abolished following the ratification of the 1973 Constitution, following President Ferdinand Marcos's declaration of martial law.

When Congress was restored in 1987, Chiongbian ran for the seat representing South Cotabato's 3rd congressional district under Lakas ng Bansa and won. During the 8th Congress, he served as assistant majority leader under House speaker Ramon Mitra Jr. He was re-elected in 1992 under Laban ng Demokratikong Pilipino. Chiongbian was later endorsed by some lawmakers from the Visayas and Mindanao as a potential candidate for speaker in the 9th Congress, but Jose de Venecia Jr. was ultimately elected.

Chiongbian notably authored Republic Act No. 7228, signed into law in March 1992, which established Sarangani as a province, earning him the nickname "Father of Sarangani." He later became its first congressional representative in 1995, running unopposed under Lakas–NUCD–UMDP, and served until his retirement from public office in 1998.

== Personal life and legacy ==
Chiongbian was married to former governor Priscilla Lopong, with whom he had four children, including Erwin, who later served as the representative for Sarangani's lone congressional district. He was the brother of former congressman William Chiongbian. He died in 2004.

The James L. Chiongbian National Trade School, formerly known as Kling National High School, in Kiamba, Sarangani, was named in his honor.

== Electoral history ==
Electoral history of James Chiongbian
| Year | Office | Party | Votes received | | | | Result |
| Year | Office | Party | Total | % | P. | Swing | Result |
|---|---|---|---|---|---|---|---|
| 1967 | Representative (South Cotabato) | Nacionalista | 22,962 | 38.14% | 1st | —N/a | Won |
| 1987 | Representative (South Cotabato–3rd) | LnB | —N/a | —N/a | 1st | —N/a | Won |
| 1992 | Representative (South Cotabato–3rd) | LDP | 43,262 | 71.82% | 1st | —N/a | Won |
| 1995 | Representative (Sarangani) | Lakas | 48,533 | 100.00% | 1st | —N/a | Unopposed |

House of Representatives of the Philippines
| New district | Member of the Philippine House of Representatives for Sarangani's at-large district 1995–1998 | Succeeded by Erwin Chiongbian |
| New district | Member of the Philippine House of Representatives for South Cotabato's 3rd district 1987–1995 | Vacant District dissolved into Sarangani's at-large district Title next held by Dibu Tuan |
| New district | Member of the Philippine House of Representatives for South Cotabato's at-large district 1968–1973 | Vacant Martial law and adoption of the 1973 Constitution Title next held by Rufino Bañas, Rogelio Garcia and Hilario de Pedro (in the Batasang Pambansa) |
