= Roque Ablan Jr. =

Filipino politician

The Honorable Roque Ablan Jr.
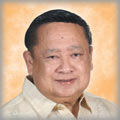
- Official portrait, 2007

Member of the Philippine House of Representatives from Ilocos Norte's 1st congressional district
- In office June 30, 2001 – June 30, 2010
- Preceded by: Rodolfo Fariñas
- Succeeded by: Rodolfo Fariñas
- In office June 30, 1987 – June 30, 1998
- Preceded by: Post restored
- Succeeded by: Rodolfo Fariñas
- In office January 22, 1968 – September 23, 1972
- Preceded by: Antonio Raquiza
- Succeeded by: Abolished; Post later held by himself

Personal details
- Born: Roquito Ravelo Ablan Jr. April 22, 1932 Laoag, Ilocos Norte, Philippine Islands
- Died: March 26, 2018 (aged 85) Taguig, Philippines
- Party: Lakas (1995–2018)
- Other political affiliations: KBL (1987–1995); Nacionalista (1963–1972)
- Education: University of the Philippines College of Law
- Occupation: Lawyer

Roque "Roquito" Ravelo Ablan Jr. (April 22, 1932 – March 26, 2018) was a Filipino politician who served as representative from Ilocos Norte. He was one of the most prominent politicians in Ilocos Norte, having served eight terms in Congress.

== Early life and education ==
He was born on April 22, 1932, in Laoag, Ilocos Norte. He was the son of former Ilocos Norte governor Roque Blanco Ablan Sr. and Manuela Ravelo. He graduated from the University of the Philippines College of Law where he joined the Upsilon Sigma Phi fraternity with Ninoy Aquino and Mel Mathay in 1950.

Ablan was known to be a close ally of President Ferdinand Marcos. In an interview, Ablan mentioned that he ran errands to deliver bar examination review materials to a then-detained Marcos.

== Political career ==
He was first elected as Ilocos Norte provincial board member in 1963, and concurrently served as Chairman of the League of Provincial Board Members in the Philippines until 1967.

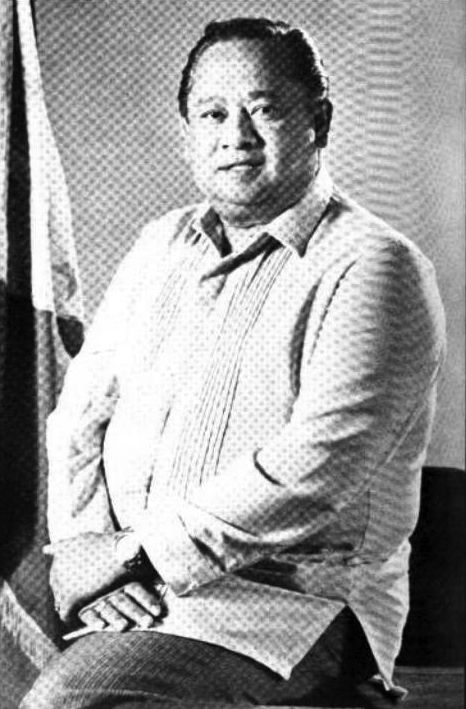
Ablan Jr. official portrait during the 8th Congress.

In 1967, he was elected into the House of Representatives through a special election and served until 1972. He was also elected to the 1971 Constitutional Convention as a delegate from Ilocos Norte. After the 1986 People Power Revolution, he was again elected as representative of Ilocos Norte and served from 1987 to 1998 and from 2001 to 2010, respectively. During these terms, he chaired the congressional committees on Housing, Dangerous Drugs, and Inter-Parliamentary Relations and Diplomacy. Among his notable legislation include the Rent Control Act of 2009, the Death Penalty Law, and the Magna Carta for Migrant Workers.

In 1998, he ran for Ilocos Norte governor but lost to Bongbong Marcos.

== Legal career ==
In 1968, Ablan and bar topnotcher Amado M. Santiago, Jr. co-founded Ablan & Santiago, a law firm which held office at Ermita, Manila. Ablan later on left the firm to run for public office.

== Military service ==
Ablan served as a soldier under the 5th Special Forces Group of the United States in Vietnam. Although an incumbent Ilocos Norte Representative, he was also a member of the Philippine Civic Action Group (PHILCAG) in South Vietnam from 1968 to 1975.

== Death ==
Ablan died on March 26, 2018, in St. Luke's Medical Center, Taguig. He is buried in the Maharlika cemetery in Laoag.
