= List of members of the House of Representatives of the Philippines (N) =

This is a complete list of past and present members of the House of Representatives of the Philippines whose last names begin with the letter N.

This list also includes members of the Philippine Assembly (1907–1916), the Commonwealth National Assembly (1935–1941), the Second Republic National Assembly (1943–1944) and the Batasang Pambansa (1978–1986).

== Na ==
- Antonio Nachura, member for Samar's 2nd district (1998–2004)
- Julio Nalundasan, member for Ilocos Norte's 2nd district (1934–1935)
- Mariano Nalupta Jr., member for Ilocos Norte's 2nd district (1987–1992)
- Rafael Nantes, member for Quezon's 1st district (1998–2007)
- Narciso Nario, member for Region III (1978–1984)
- Teodulo Natividad, member for Bulacan's 1st district (1961–1972, 1992–1997), Region III (1978–1984), and Bulacan (1984–1986)
- Maricel Natividad-Nagaño, member for Nueva Ecija's 4th district (2019–2022)
- Catalino Nava, member for Guimaras (1995)
- JC Rahman Nava, member for Guimaras (2007–2016, 2025–present)
- Lucille Nava, member for Guimaras (2016–2025)
- Miguel Nava, member for Cagayan's 2nd district (1916–1919), and Cagayan's 1st district (1919–1922)
- Pablo Nava III, member for APPEND party-list (2013–2016)
- Constantino Navarro Sr., member for Surigao del Norte (1965–1972, 1984–1986), Region X (1978–1984), and Surigao del Norte's 2nd district (1987–1992)
- Constantino Navarro Jr., member for Surigao del Norte's 1st district (1995–2001)
- Mauro Navarro, member for Pangasinan's 1st district (1922–1925)
- Ricardo Navarro, member for Surigao (1934–1935, 1938–1941, 1945–1949)
- Roberto Nazal Jr., member for Magsasaka party-list (2022), and Bagong Henerasyon party-list (2025–present)
- Dominador Nazareno Jr., member for Cavite's 1st district (1992–1995)

== Ne ==
- Francisco Nepomuceno, member for Pampanga's 1st district (1957–1961)
- Francis Nepomuceno, member for Pampanga's 1st district (1998–2007)
- Juanita Nepomuceno, member for Pampanga's 1st district (1961–1969), and Pampanga (1984–1986)
- Ricardo Nepomuceno, member for Marinduque (1922–1931)
- Jose Paul Neri, member for Camiguin (1969–1972, 1984–1986)
- Liliano Neri, member for Region X (1978–1986)
- Ramon Neri, member for Misamis's 2nd district (1916–1919)

== Ni ==
- Reylina Nicolas, member for Bulacan's 4th district (2001–2010)
- Emigdio Nietes, member for Antique (1945–1949)
- John Marvin Nieto, member for Manila's 3rd district (2016–2022)
- Manuel Nieto, member for Isabela (1925–1928), and Nueva Vizcaya (1928–1931)
- Ernesto Nieva, member for Manila's 1st district (1998–2007)
- Gregorio Nieva, member for Tayabas's 2nd district (1907–1912, 1916–1919)
- Jernie Jett Nisay, member for Pusong Pinoy party-list (2022–present)

== No ==
- Bem Noel, member for An Waray party-list (2004–2013, 2019–2023)
- Maximino Noel, member for Cebu's 3rd district (1928–1934, 1938–1941, 1945–1949, 1953–1965)
- Pastor Noel, member for Cebu's 6th district (1925–1928)
- Victoria Isabel Noel, member for An Waray party-list (2013–2019)
- Karlo Nograles, member for Davao City's 1st district (2010–2018)
- Jericho Nograles, member for PBA party-list (2016–2022)
- Fidel Nograles, member for Rizal's 2nd district (2019–2022), and Rizal's 4th district (2022–present)
- Migs Nograles, member for PBA party-list (2022–present)
- Prospero Nograles, member for Davao City's 1st district (1989–1992, 1995–1998, 2001–2010)
- Juan Nolasco, member for Manila's 1st district (1919–1922)
- Ramon Nolasco, member for Cagayan's 1st district (2016–2019, 2025–present)
- Ramon Nolasco Jr., member for Cagayan's 1st district (2019–2025)
- Mateo Nonato, member for Iloilo's 1st district (1946–1949)

== Nu ==
- Jose T. Nueno, member for Manila's 1st district (1946–1949)
- Jose Nuguid, member for Bataan (1953–1965)
- Jorge Nuñez, member for Region IV-A (1978–1984), and Cavite's 3rd district (1987–1992)
- Justino Nuyda Sr., member for Albay's 2nd district (1934–1941, 1949–1965)
