= 2010 Davao Region local elections =

Local elections in the Philippines

Local elections were held in the Davao Region on May 10, 2010, as part of the 2010 Philippine general election.

== Compostela Valley ==
=== Governor ===
Incumbent governor Arturo Uy of Lakas–Kampi–CMD won re-election to a second term.

| Candidate | Party | Votes | % |
|---|---|---|---|
| Arturo Uy | Lakas–Kampi–CMD | 206,920 | 100.00 |
| Total | | 206,920 | 100.00 |
| Valid votes | | 206,920 | 78.49 |
| Invalid/blank votes | | 56,715 | 21.51 |
| Total votes | | 263,635 | 100.00 |
| Lakas–Kampi–CMD hold | | | |
Source: Commission on Elections

=== Vice governor ===
Ramil Gentugaya of Lakas–Kampi–CMD was elected as vice governor.

| Candidate | Party | Votes | % |
|---|---|---|---|
| Ramil Gentugaya | Lakas–Kampi–CMD | 195,909 | 100.00 |
| Total | | 195,909 | 100.00 |
| Valid votes | | 195,909 | 74.31 |
| Invalid/blank votes | | 67,726 | 25.69 |
| Total votes | | 263,635 | 100.00 |
Source: Commission on Elections

=== Provincial board ===
The Compostela Valley Provincial Board is composed of 14 board members, 10 of whom are elected.

| Party | Votes | % | Seats |
|---|---|---|---|
| Lakas–Kampi–CMD | 592,718 | 70.71 | 8 |
| Liberal Party | 105,835 | 12.63 | 1 |
| Aksyon Demokratiko | 87,776 | 10.47 | 0 |
| Independent | 51,892 | 6.19 | 1 |
| Total | 838,221 | 100.00 | 10 |
| Total votes | 263,635 | – | |
Source: Commission on Elections

==== 1st district ====
| Candidate | Party | Votes | % |
|---|---|---|---|
| Joselito Brillantes | Lakas–Kampi–CMD | 72,967 | 18.66 |
| Arvin Dexter Lopoz | Lakas–Kampi–CMD | 55,667 | 14.23 |
| Paul Galicia | Lakas–Kampi–CMD | 54,062 | 13.82 |
| Neri Barte | Lakas–Kampi–CMD | 45,808 | 11.71 |
| Heracleo Codilla | Independent | 42,226 | 10.80 |
| William Andres | Aksyon Demokratiko | 38,901 | 9.95 |
| Mary Alam | Lakas–Kampi–CMD | 32,565 | 8.33 |
| Aniano Gador | Aksyon Demokratiko | 24,819 | 6.35 |
| Joel Caballes | Aksyon Demokratiko | 24,056 | 6.15 |
| Total | | 391,071 | 100.00 |
| Total votes | | 122,146 | – |
Source: Commission on Elections

==== 2nd district ====
| Candidate | Party | Votes | % |
|---|---|---|---|
| Ruwel Peter Gonzaga | Lakas–Kampi–CMD | 78,922 | 17.65 |
| Cesar Richa | Lakas–Kampi–CMD | 69,968 | 15.65 |
| Kristine Mae Caballero | Liberal Party | 68,121 | 15.23 |
| Ruben Flores | Lakas–Kampi–CMD | 66,523 | 14.88 |
| Moran Takasan | Lakas–Kampi–CMD | 58,988 | 13.19 |
| Rogelio Arambala | Lakas–Kampi–CMD | 57,248 | 12.80 |
| Veronica Reichel | Liberal Party | 14,004 | 3.13 |
| Magin Onia | Liberal Party | 12,757 | 2.85 |
| Frederick Trangia | Liberal Party | 10,953 | 2.45 |
| Abdulrahim Abdul | Independent | 9,666 | 2.16 |
| Total | | 447,150 | 100.00 |
| Total votes | | 141,489 | – |
Source: Commission on Elections

== Davao City ==
=== Mayor ===
Term-limited incumbent mayor Rodrigo Duterte of the Liberal Party ran for vice mayor. Duterte endorsed his daughter, vice mayor Sara Duterte of PDP–Laban, who won the election.

| Candidate | Party | Votes | % |
|---|---|---|---|
| Sara Duterte | PDP–Laban | 388,465 | 70.06 |
| Prospero Nograles | Lakas–Kampi–CMD | 160,225 | 28.90 |
| Rodrigo Buezon Sr. | Independent | 2,191 | 0.40 |
| Rodrigo Sulamin | Independent | 1,941 | 0.35 |
| Magdaleno Marcellones | Independent | 1,639 | 0.30 |
| Total | | 554,461 | 100.00 |
| Valid votes | | 554,461 | 95.99 |
| Invalid/blank votes | | 23,141 | 4.01 |
| Total votes | | 577,602 | 100.00 |
| PDP–Laban gain from Liberal Party | | | |
Source: Commission on Elections

=== Vice mayor ===
Incumbent vice mayor Sara Duterte of PDP–Laban ran for mayor of Davao City. Duterte endorsed her father, mayor Rodrigo Duterte of the Liberal Party, who won the election.

| Candidate | Party | Votes | % |
|---|---|---|---|
| Rodrigo Duterte | Liberal Party | 440,030 | 80.26 |
| Benjamin de Guzman | Lakas–Kampi–CMD | 105,962 | 19.33 |
| Roberto Macaraeg | Independent | 2,260 | 0.41 |
| Total | | 548,252 | 100.00 |
| Valid votes | | 548,252 | 94.92 |
| Invalid/blank votes | | 29,350 | 5.08 |
| Total votes | | 577,602 | 100.00 |
| Liberal Party gain from PDP–Laban | | | |
Source: Commission on Elections

=== City council ===
The Davao City Council is composed of 27 councilors, 24 of whom are elected.

| Party | Votes | % | Seats |
|---|---|---|---|
| Liberal Party | 883,170 | 23.75 | 7 |
| Lakas–Kampi–CMD | 846,145 | 22.76 | 1 |
| PDP–Laban | 736,720 | 19.81 | 7 |
| Nationalist People's Coalition | 268,105 | 7.21 | 3 |
| Bayan Muna | 180,982 | 4.87 | 1 |
| Partido Demokratiko Sosyalista ng Pilipinas | 124,920 | 3.36 | 2 |
| Akbayan | 13,618 | 0.37 | 0 |
| Nacionalista Party | 11,727 | 0.32 | 0 |
| Bangon Pilipinas | 7,332 | 0.20 | 0 |
| Buklod | 6,822 | 0.18 | 0 |
| Independent | 638,602 | 17.18 | 3 |
| Total | 3,718,143 | 100.00 | 24 |
| Total votes | 577,602 | – | |
Source: Commission on Elections

==== 1st district ====
| Candidate | Party | Votes | % |
|---|---|---|---|
| Wendel Avisado | PDP–Laban | 118,094 | 8.00 |
| Leah Librado | Bayan Muna | 97,501 | 6.61 |
| Edgar Ibuyan | PDP–Laban | 94,876 | 6.43 |
| Emmanuel Galicia | Liberal Party | 94,794 | 6.42 |
| Jesus Melchor Quitain | Liberal Party | 90,416 | 6.13 |
| Nilo Abellera Jr. | Liberal Party | 90,378 | 6.12 |
| Jo Anne Bonguyan | Lakas–Kampi–CMD | 81,503 | 5.52 |
| Pilar Braga | Independent | 80,193 | 5.43 |
| Jeff Ho | Lakas–Kampi–CMD | 63,673 | 4.31 |
| Napoleon Militar | Independent | 59,578 | 4.04 |
| Evelyn Laviña | Liberal Party | 54,533 | 3.70 |
| Lester Lawrence Avila | Independent | 54,342 | 3.68 |
| Jose Joel Virador | Bayan Muna | 52,673 | 3.57 |
| William Ramirez | PDP–Laban | 49,917 | 3.38 |
| Joel Santes | Lakas–Kampi–CMD | 47,515 | 3.22 |
| Rene Alexis Villarente | Lakas–Kampi–CMD | 46,587 | 3.16 |
| Pablito Parilla | Lakas–Kampi–CMD | 39,710 | 2.69 |
| Shane Dolor | Lakas–Kampi–CMD | 36,453 | 2.47 |
| Prospero Mojica | Lakas–Kampi–CMD | 33,719 | 2.28 |
| Hector de los Reyes | Lakas–Kampi–CMD | 32,092 | 2.17 |
| Ranoelo Leonar | Independent | 25,728 | 1.74 |
| Amil Bangsa Manding | Independent | 13,700 | 0.93 |
| Randy Ponteras | Akbayan | 13,618 | 0.92 |
| Antonio Vergara | Independent | 12,815 | 0.87 |
| Christian Jay Lim | Nacionalista Party | 11,727 | 0.79 |
| Ernesto Macasaet Jr. | Independent | 11,154 | 0.76 |
| Eddie Fuentes | Independent | 9,417 | 0.64 |
| Domingo Andolana | Independent | 9,148 | 0.62 |
| Benjamin Rivera Jr. | Independent | 7,396 | 0.50 |
| Edwin Gonzaga | Independent | 6,754 | 0.46 |
| Ferdinand Lu | Independent | 5,551 | 0.38 |
| Rodolfo Antolin | Independent | 4,352 | 0.29 |
| Carlos Crilo | Independent | 4,067 | 0.28 |
| Inocentes Bornea | Independent | 3,807 | 0.26 |
| Stella Marissa Reyes | Independent | 3,380 | 0.23 |
| Alberto Yap | Independent | 3,315 | 0.22 |
| Arlex Galido | Independent | 3,083 | 0.21 |
| Jocelyn Yap | Independent | 2,981 | 0.20 |
| Rogelio Paconla | Independent | 1,955 | 0.13 |
| Magompara Magandia | Independent | 1,655 | 0.11 |
| Michael Tabelo | Independent | 1,622 | 0.11 |
| Total | | 1,475,772 | 100.00 |
| Total votes | | 222,520 | – |
Source: Commission on Elections

==== 2nd district ====
| Candidate | Party | Votes | % |
|---|---|---|---|
| Louie John Bonguyan | Liberal Party | 101,198 | 8.24 |
| Dante Apostol | Independent | 95,605 | 7.79 |
| Arnolfo Cabling | PDP–Laban | 77,648 | 6.32 |
| Tomas Monteverde IV | Nationalist People's Coalition | 76,878 | 6.26 |
| Alryan Alejandre | Nationalist People's Coalition | 66,310 | 5.40 |
| Marissa Salvador-Abella | Independent | 65,257 | 5.32 |
| Jimmy Dureza | Partido Demokratiko Sosyalista ng Pilipinas | 62,654 | 5.10 |
| April Marie Dayap | Partido Demokratiko Sosyalista ng Pilipinas | 62,266 | 5.07 |
| Gerald Anthony Bangoy | Nationalist People's Coalition | 61,068 | 4.97 |
| Michael Aportadera | Liberal Party | 60,502 | 4.93 |
| Joji Jude Lumanog | Liberal Party | 59,999 | 4.89 |
| Nenita Orcullo | PDP–Laban | 52,711 | 4.29 |
| Ernie Alterado | PDP–Laban | 49,397 | 4.02 |
| Angelo Aportadera | Lakas–Kampi–CMD | 43,204 | 3.52 |
| Leonardo Miguel Aquino | Liberal Party | 41,601 | 3.39 |
| Leopoldo Cagatin | Lakas–Kampi–CMD | 41,551 | 3.38 |
| Ariel Casilao | Bayan Muna | 30,808 | 2.51 |
| Beethoven Orcullo | Lakas–Kampi–CMD | 29,692 | 2.42 |
| Anthony Pichon | Lakas–Kampi–CMD | 25,038 | 2.04 |
| Senforiano Alterado Jr. | Independent | 23,462 | 1.91 |
| Luis Rodriguez Jr. | Lakas–Kampi–CMD | 22,418 | 1.83 |
| Lito Lapitan | Independent | 21,641 | 1.76 |
| Jose Amban | Lakas–Kampi–CMD | 15,894 | 1.29 |
| Joseph Saucejo | Lakas–Kampi–CMD | 14,689 | 1.20 |
| Elvira Sederiosa | Lakas–Kampi–CMD | 11,152 | 0.91 |
| Dino Ferdinand Galido | PDP–Laban | 6,202 | 0.51 |
| Richard Unla | Independent | 4,010 | 0.33 |
| Richard Alcebar | Independent | 2,835 | 0.23 |
| Rhoda Noriega | Independent | 2,083 | 0.17 |
| Total | | 1,227,773 | 100.00 |
| Total votes | | 191,853 | – |
Source: Commission on Elections

==== 3rd district ====
| Candidate | Party | Votes | % |
|---|---|---|---|
| Karlo Bello | Liberal Party | 91,668 | 9.03 |
| Rachel Zozobrado | Liberal Party | 83,638 | 8.24 |
| Myrna Dalodo-Ortiz | PDP–Laban | 76,750 | 7.56 |
| Bernard Al-ag | PDP–Laban | 73,846 | 7.28 |
| Jose Villafuerte | PDP–Laban | 73,471 | 7.24 |
| Rene Elias Lopez | Nationalist People's Coalition | 63,849 | 6.29 |
| Conrado Baluran | PDP–Laban | 63,808 | 6.29 |
| Victorio Advincula Jr. | Liberal Party | 59,534 | 5.87 |
| Magno Adalin Jr. | Liberal Party | 54,909 | 5.41 |
| Allan Dolor | Lakas–Kampi–CMD | 46,949 | 4.63 |
| Teresita Mata-Marañon | Lakas–Kampi–CMD | 46,006 | 4.53 |
| Gregorio Pantig | Lakas–Kampi–CMD | 45,562 | 4.49 |
| Domingo Dalodo | Independent | 41,580 | 4.10 |
| Aldion Layao | Lakas–Kampi–CMD | 36,226 | 3.57 |
| Lolito Sucayre | Lakas–Kampi–CMD | 29,898 | 2.95 |
| Reynaldo Reyes | Lakas–Kampi–CMD | 29,366 | 2.89 |
| Salvador Caingles | Lakas–Kampi–CMD | 27,248 | 2.69 |
| Angelico Santander Jr. | Independent | 21,135 | 2.08 |
| Allan Joy Sumandang | Independent | 8,009 | 0.79 |
| Genaro Casumpa | Bangon Pilipinas | 7,332 | 0.72 |
| Daniel Guillen | Independent | 6,824 | 0.67 |
| Eduard Trinidad | Buklod | 6,822 | 0.67 |
| Samuel Lasay | Independent | 4,824 | 0.48 |
| Rogelio Bantiles | Independent | 3,476 | 0.34 |
| Lyndon Aballe | Independent | 2,888 | 0.28 |
| Lucio Gutierrez Jr. | Independent | 1,954 | 0.19 |
| Cecilio Manaois Jr. | Independent | 1,851 | 0.18 |
| Ernesto Gerodias | Independent | 1,783 | 0.18 |
| Rogelio Montajes | Independent | 1,703 | 0.17 |
| Romeo Saberon Sr. | Independent | 1,689 | 0.17 |
| Total | | 1,014,598 | 100.00 |
| Total votes | | 163,229 | – |
Source: Commission on Elections

== Davao del Norte ==
=== Governor ===
Incumbent governor Rodolfo del Rosario of the Liberal Party won re-election to a second term.

| Candidate | Party | Votes | % |
|---|---|---|---|
| Rodolfo del Rosario | Liberal Party | 296,453 | 100.00 |
| Total | | 296,453 | 100.00 |
| Valid votes | | 296,453 | 82.71 |
| Invalid/blank votes | | 61,975 | 17.29 |
| Total votes | | 358,428 | 100.00 |
| Liberal Party hold | | | |
Source: Commission on Elections

=== Vice governor ===
Victorio Suaybaguio Jr. of the Liberal Party was elected as vice governor.

| Candidate | Party | Votes | % |
|---|---|---|---|
| Victorio Suaybaguio | Liberal Party | 230,220 | 74.19 |
| Rogelio Israel | Lakas–Kampi–CMD | 80,075 | 25.81 |
| Total | | 310,295 | 100.00 |
| Valid votes | | 310,295 | 86.57 |
| Invalid/blank votes | | 48,133 | 13.43 |
| Total votes | | 358,428 | 100.00 |
Source: Commission on Elections

=== Provincial board ===
The Davao del Norte Provincial Board is composed of 14 board members, 10 of whom are elected.

| Party | Votes | % | Seats |
|---|---|---|---|
| Liberal Party | 511,661 | 41.76 | 4 |
| Lakas–Kampi–CMD | 449,536 | 36.69 | 5 |
| PDP–Laban | 52,242 | 4.26 | 0 |
| Pwersa ng Masang Pilipino | 28,869 | 2.36 | 0 |
| Independent | 182,827 | 14.92 | 1 |
| Total | 1,225,135 | 100.00 | 10 |
| Total votes | 358,428 | – | |
Source: Commission on Elections

==== 1st district ====
| Candidate | Party | Votes | % |
|---|---|---|---|
| Shirley Belen Aala | Liberal Party | 95,283 | 15.69 |
| Raymond Joey Millan | Liberal Party | 88,691 | 14.60 |
| Vicente Eliot Sr. | Liberal Party | 77,073 | 12.69 |
| Antonio Lagunzad | Liberal Party | 72,533 | 11.94 |
| Alfredo de Veyra | Lakas–Kampi–CMD | 53,723 | 8.84 |
| Arniel Zulueta | PDP–Laban | 52,242 | 8.60 |
| Ernesto Obero | Liberal Party | 51,553 | 8.49 |
| Simeon Lim | Lakas–Kampi–CMD | 36,805 | 6.06 |
| Roger Laguna | Independent | 27,706 | 4.56 |
| Oliver Malacaste | Lakas–Kampi–CMD | 22,943 | 3.78 |
| Bezer Lacson | Pwersa ng Masang Pilipino | 14,817 | 2.44 |
| Huberto Nator | Pwersa ng Masang Pilipino | 7,528 | 1.24 |
| Arlene Llamada | Pwersa ng Masang Pilipino | 6,524 | 1.07 |
| Total | | 607,421 | 100.00 |
| Total votes | | 173,155 | – |
Source: Commission on Elections

==== 2nd district ====
| Candidate | Party | Votes | % |
|---|---|---|---|
| Janet Gavina | Lakas–Kampi–CMD | 80,000 | 12.95 |
| Daniel Lu | Lakas–Kampi–CMD | 75,112 | 12.16 |
| Alan Dujali | Independent | 72,138 | 11.68 |
| Ely Dacalus | Lakas–Kampi–CMD | 68,176 | 11.04 |
| Hernanie Duco | Lakas–Kampi–CMD | 61,045 | 9.88 |
| Araceli Ayuste | Liberal Party | 59,247 | 9.59 |
| Salvador Royo | Independent | 55,398 | 8.97 |
| Artemio San Juan | Lakas–Kampi–CMD | 51,732 | 8.37 |
| Demetrio Maligro | Liberal Party | 37,306 | 6.04 |
| Rolando Santa Ana | Liberal Party | 29,975 | 4.85 |
| Conrado Cocamas | Independent | 27,585 | 4.47 |
| Total | | 617,714 | 100.00 |
| Total votes | | 185,273 | – |
Source: Commission on Elections

== Davao del Sur ==
=== Governor ===
Incumbent governor Douglas Cagas of the Nacionalista Party won re-election to a second term.

| Candidate | Party | Votes | % |
|---|---|---|---|
| Douglas Cagas | Nacionalista Party | 163,440 | 48.19 |
| Claude Bautista | Nationalist People's Coalition | 159,527 | 47.04 |
| Alex Wangkay | Pwersa ng Masang Pilipino | 11,601 | 3.42 |
| Dominador Carrillo | Independent | 3,733 | 1.10 |
| Rosemarie Villamor | Independent | 826 | 0.24 |
| Total | | 339,127 | 100.00 |
| Valid votes | | 339,127 | 93.19 |
| Invalid/blank votes | | 24,800 | 6.81 |
| Total votes | | 363,927 | 100.00 |
| Nacionalista Party hold | | | |
Source: Commission on Elections

=== Vice governor ===
Arsenio Latasa of the Nationalist People's Coalition was elected as vice governor.

| Candidate | Party | Votes | % |
|---|---|---|---|
| Arsenio Latasa | Nationalist People's Coalition | 171,013 | 53.57 |
| Merlin Bello | Nacionalista Party | 107,648 | 33.72 |
| Simplicio Latasa | Pwersa ng Masang Pilipino | 28,845 | 9.04 |
| Pablo Villaber | Independent | 6,987 | 2.19 |
| Lorna Bandigan | Lakas–Kampi–CMD | 4,737 | 1.48 |
| Total | | 319,230 | 100.00 |
| Valid votes | | 319,230 | 87.72 |
| Invalid/blank votes | | 44,697 | 12.28 |
| Total votes | | 363,927 | 100.00 |
Source: Commission on Elections

=== Provincial board ===
The Davao del Sur Provincial Board is composed of 13 board members, 10 of whom are elected.

| Party | Votes | % | Seats |
|---|---|---|---|
| Nacionalista Party | 501,051 | 42.11 | 5 |
| Nationalist People's Coalition | 314,173 | 26.40 | 2 |
| Lakas–Kampi–CMD | 81,259 | 6.83 | 1 |
| Bangon Pilipinas | 43,929 | 3.69 | 0 |
| Lapiang Manggagawa | 27,246 | 2.29 | 0 |
| Pwersa ng Masang Pilipino | 8,258 | 0.69 | 0 |
| Independent | 213,945 | 17.98 | 2 |
| Total | 1,189,861 | 100.00 | 10 |
| Total votes | 363,927 | – | |
Source: Commission on Elections

==== 1st district ====
| Candidate | Party | Votes | % |
|---|---|---|---|
| Mercedes Cagas | Nacionalista Party | 88,978 | 11.80 |
| Nonito Llanos III | Independent | 88,499 | 11.74 |
| Aileen Almendras | Independent | 78,645 | 10.43 |
| Ricardo Molina Jr. | Nacionalista Party | 77,414 | 10.27 |
| Marvin Manos | Nacionalista Party | 63,471 | 8.42 |
| Romualdo Garcia | Nationalist People's Coalition | 62,361 | 8.27 |
| Rey Ayo | Nationalist People's Coalition | 60,778 | 8.06 |
| Francisco Tongcos | Nacionalista Party | 58,055 | 7.70 |
| Marc Dominic Fernandez | Nacionalista Party | 55,473 | 7.36 |
| Gladys Razonable-Gascon | Nationalist People's Coalition | 49,043 | 6.51 |
| Alejandro Flores | Bangon Pilipinas | 43,929 | 5.83 |
| Alejandro Almendras III | Lapiang Manggagawa | 27,246 | 3.61 |
| Total | | 753,892 | 100.00 |
| Total votes | | 210,946 | – |
Source: Commission on Elections

==== 2nd district ====
| Candidate | Party | Votes | % |
|---|---|---|---|
| Fatima Grace Baliota | Nacionalista Party | 43,278 | 9.93 |
| Allan Colina | Lakas–Kampi–CMD | 38,253 | 8.77 |
| Princess Erum Parcasio | Nationalist People's Coalition | 37,787 | 8.67 |
| Isabelo Masiwel | Nacionalista Party | 31,074 | 7.13 |
| Ligaya Gealon | Nationalist People's Coalition | 30,891 | 7.09 |
| Elmer Calinawan | Nacionalista Party | 30,169 | 6.92 |
| Rogelio Vicente Baribar | Nationalist People's Coalition | 29,169 | 6.69 |
| Leopoldo Diones Jr. | Nacionalista Party | 29,062 | 6.67 |
| Paulito Montero | Independent | 26,730 | 6.13 |
| Serafin Licuan | Nacionalista Party | 24,077 | 5.52 |
| Genevieve Indira Abangan | Nationalist People's Coalition | 23,719 | 5.44 |
| Dindo Hortel | Lakas–Kampi–CMD | 22,282 | 5.11 |
| Pedro Sarmiento | Lakas–Kampi–CMD | 20,724 | 4.75 |
| Diacarba Abe | Nationalist People's Coalition | 20,425 | 4.68 |
| Gilbert Romeo Mayor | Independent | 10,081 | 2.31 |
| Anecito Mangolayon | Pwersa ng Masang Pilipino | 8,258 | 1.89 |
| Leonardo Baldoza Jr. | Independent | 6,193 | 1.42 |
| Dionesper Vergara | Independent | 3,797 | 0.87 |
| Total | | 435,969 | 100.00 |
| Total votes | | 152,981 | – |
Source: Commission on Elections

== Davao Oriental ==
=== Governor ===
Incumbent governor Corazon Malanyaon of the Nacionalista Party won re-election to a second term.

| Candidate | Party | Votes | % |
|---|---|---|---|
| Corazon Malanyaon | Nacionalista Party | 181,726 | 96.52 |
| Ruben Feliciano | Pwersa ng Masang Pilipino | 6,549 | 3.48 |
| Total | | 188,275 | 100.00 |
| Valid votes | | 188,275 | 89.48 |
| Invalid/blank votes | | 22,146 | 10.52 |
| Total votes | | 210,421 | 100.00 |
| Nacionalista Party hold | | | |
Source: Commission on Elections

=== Vice governor ===
Incumbent vice governor Joel Mayo Almario of Lakas–Kampi–CMD won re-election to a second term unopposed.

| Candidate | Party | Votes | % |
|---|---|---|---|
| Joel Mayo Almario | Lakas–Kampi–CMD | 147,103 | 100.00 |
| Total | | 147,103 | 100.00 |
| Valid votes | | 147,103 | 69.91 |
| Invalid/blank votes | | 63,318 | 30.09 |
| Total votes | | 210,421 | 100.00 |
| Lakas–Kampi–CMD hold | | | |
Source: Commission on Elections

=== Provincial board ===
The Davao Oriental Provincial Board is composed of 14 board members, 10 of whom are elected.

| Party | Votes | % | Seats |
|---|---|---|---|
| Nacionalista Party | 259,678 | 38.70 | 5 |
| Lakas–Kampi–CMD | 168,732 | 25.15 | 2 |
| Liberal Party | 64,273 | 9.58 | 1 |
| Laban ng Demokratikong Pilipino | 24,264 | 3.62 | 0 |
| Independent | 153,970 | 22.95 | 2 |
| Total | 670,917 | 100.00 | 10 |
| Total votes | 210,421 | – | |
Source: Commission on Elections

==== 1st district ====
| Candidate | Party | Votes | % |
|---|---|---|---|
| Ronald Lara | Nacionalista Party | 46,445 | 17.51 |
| Mario Jose Palma Gil | Liberal Party | 40,372 | 15.22 |
| Nestor Uy | Nacionalista Party | 38,838 | 14.64 |
| Anna Louise Tambilawan | Independent | 34,869 | 13.15 |
| Ramona Olea | Nacionalista Party | 32,820 | 12.38 |
| Dante Caubang | Nacionalista Party | 31,726 | 11.96 |
| Aristotle Abella | Independent | 25,036 | 9.44 |
| Napoleon Sango | Independent | 15,103 | 5.69 |
| Total | | 265,209 | 100.00 |
| Total votes | | 84,889 | – |
Source: Commission on Elections

==== 2nd district ====
| Candidate | Party | Votes | % |
|---|---|---|---|
| Niño Uy Jr. | Lakas–Kampi–CMD | 65,056 | 16.04 |
| Delfin Miones | Nacionalista Party | 58,486 | 14.42 |
| Anthony John Eric Rabat | Lakas–Kampi–CMD | 53,001 | 13.06 |
| Justina Yu | Nacionalista Party | 51,363 | 12.66 |
| Daud Linsag | Independent | 50,778 | 12.52 |
| Anacleto Macatabog | Lakas–Kampi–CMD | 50,675 | 12.49 |
| Nenita Balugo | Independent | 25,447 | 6.27 |
| Jose Maunas | Laban ng Demokratikong Pilipino | 24,264 | 5.98 |
| Basilio Adlawan Jr. | Liberal Party | 23,901 | 5.89 |
| Noriel Demua | Independent | 2,737 | 0.67 |
| Total | | 405,708 | 100.00 |
| Total votes | | 125,532 | – |
Source: Commission on Elections
