= Nograles =

Nograles is a surname. Notable people with the surname include:

- Jericho Nograles (born 1981), Filipino politician
- Karlo Nograles (born 1976), Filipino lawyer and politician
- Prospero Nograles (1947–2019), Filipino lawyer and politician
- Migs Nograles (born 1990), Filipino lawyer and politician
