= Cagas =

Cagas is a Philippine surname. Notable people with the surname include:

- Douglas Cagas (1943–2021), Philippine politician
- John Tracy Cagas (born 1965), Filipino politician and lawyer
- Marc Douglas Cagas IV (born 1976), Governor of Davao del Sur
- Yvonne Roña Cagas (born 1990), Filipino politician

== See also ==
- Caga
