= Cerge Remonde =

Filipino journalist and politician (1958-2010)

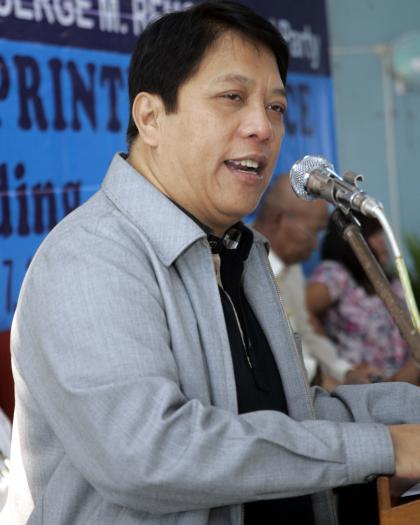
- Remonde in 2009

Press Secretary
- In office February 1, 2009 – January 19, 2010
- President: Gloria Macapagal Arroyo
- Preceded by: Jesus Dureza
- Succeeded by: Conrado Limcaoco Jr. (OIC)

Lead Convenor of National Anti-Poverty Commission
- In office September 8, 2006 – November 2006
- President: Gloria Macapagal Arroyo
- Preceded by: Zamzamin Ampatuan
- Succeeded by: Domingo F. Panganiban

Chairman of the Radio Philippines Network
- In office 2003–2007
- Preceded by: Leonor Linao
- Succeeded by: Mona Valisno

Personal details
- Born: Glicerio Mamites Remonde; December 21, 1958 Lamacan, Argao, Cebu, the Philippines
- Died: January 19, 2010 (aged 51) Makati, Metro Manila, the Philippines

Glicerio "Cerge" Mamites Remonde (December 21, 1958 – January 19, 2010) was a Filipino journalist, politician and former chairman of Radio Philippines Network, one of the largest media networks in the Philippines.

== Early life ==
Cerge was born Glecerio Mamites Remonde (later legally changing his name to Cerge) on December 21, 1958, to Teofilo A. Remonde and Florentina S. Mamites in barangay Lamacan, Argao, Cebu. Some people have said that Cerge was an illegitimate child, however, the truth is, it was his father, Teofilo, who was an illegitimate child. Teofilo Remonde, a bus driver, was the son of Flaviana Remonde. He married Florentina Mamites, daughter of Roman Mamites and Marta Sanchez, on June 25, 1958. Cerge was their one and only child, born six months after their marriage. Teofilo, however, died when Cerge was not yet one year old. After Cerge's father died, his mother remarried to Andres Alburo and from that marriage he had eight siblings: Asterio, Virgilio, Andres Jr., Antonieta, Hemres, Serina, Vicente and Sincero.

== Educational life ==
He was a graduate of the University of the Visayas where he also became professor of political science. He later served as chair of the Association of Broadcasters of the Philippines for six consecutive terms, the only chair to have ever done so.

== Career ==
One of Remonde’s early jobs in media included being a stringer at the Philippine News Agency (PNA). He was an anchor for DYLA Interaction, a primetime news and commentary program. He eventually became National Chairman of the Kapisanan ng mga Brodkaster ng Pilipinas (KBP), and was the first KBP chair to be elected to a 6th term. In 2001, Remonde became press undersecretary in charge of broadcast and the executive director of the Radio Television Malacañang Presidential Broadcast Staff. He also became the president of IBC Channel 13 and of RPN Channel 9. He became Secretary of the Government Mass Media Group (GMMG) in 2004. In September 8, 2006, he was appointed as the lead convenor of the National Anti-Poverty Commission while still serving as Secretary of the GMMG. Later, he became Director-General of the Presidential Management Staff, and finally, on February 1, 2009, he was appointed as Press Secretary, a position he held until his death.

== Professional affiliations ==
Remonde was senior adviser to the GRP-NDF Peace Panel. He was also chairman of several organizations: The Advertising Board of the Philippines, the Freedom Fund for Filipino Journalists, and the Appeals Board of the Movie and Television Review and Classification Board (MTRCB). He was also a commissioner of the Communications Committee for UNESCO.

== Personal life ==
He was married to Danish national Marit Stinus, and had no children.

== Death ==
On January 19, 2010, Remonde was found slumped at his residence in Makati and was rushed to Makati Medical Center, where he was pronounced dead at 11:51 a.m. It was determined that his death was due to cardiac arrest secondary to myocardial infarction. His remains lay in state at the Heritage Park in Taguig until January 21, when they were taken to Malacañan Palace, before finally being flown home to his native Cebu on January 22. He was buried on January 24, 2010, at Argao Catholic Cemetery, Argao, Cebu.

== Awards ==
- Most Outstanding Visayan in the field of Mass Media in 1998
- Most Outstanding Cebuano with former Chief Justice Hilario Davide, Jr. (1999).

== Historical commemoration ==
Municipal resolution 215, the street bounded by Isidro Kintanar Street and Zamora Street in Barangay Lamacan, Argao originally known as Carlock Street was renamed in his honor.
