= 1992 Davao City local elections =

Philippine election

1992 Davao City mayoral election
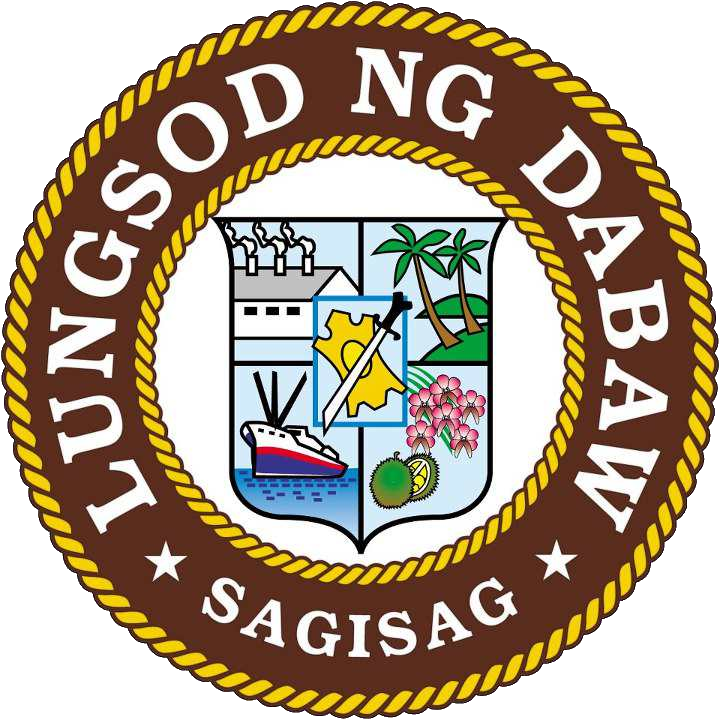
- May 11, 1992
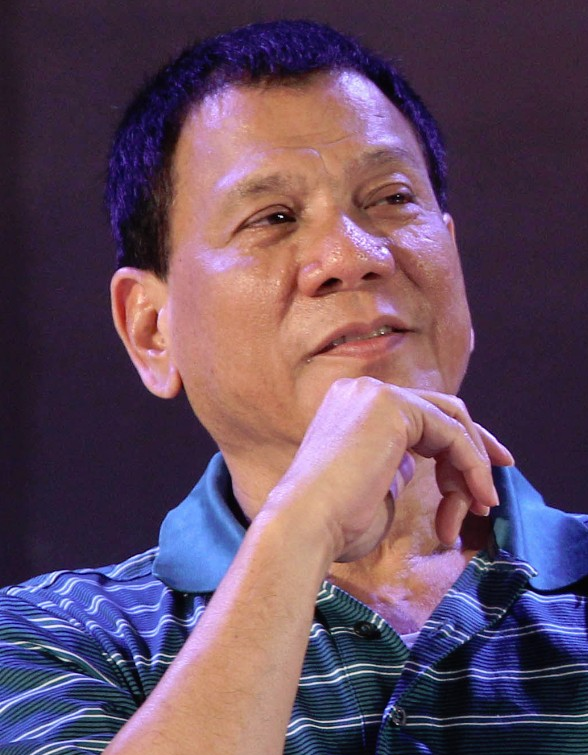

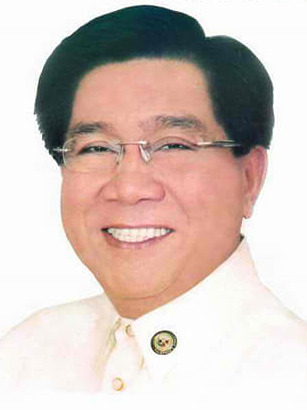
			Lakas
Candidate	Rodrigo Duterte	Prospero Nograles	Alexis Almendras
Party	NPC	LDP	Lakas
Running mate	Valentino Banzon	N/A	Luis Bonguyan
Popular vote	185,569	86,647	32,874
Percentage	60.66%	28.33%	10.75%
Mayor before election
Rodrigo Duterte
Nacionalista
Elected mayor
Rodrigo Duterte
NPC

Local elections were held in Davao City on May 11, 1992, as part of the 1992 Philippine general election. The voters elected for the elective local posts in the city: the mayor, vice mayor, three congressional representatives and 24 city councilors, eight in each of the city's three legislative districts.

== Results ==
=== Mayor ===
Incumbent mayor Rodrigo Duterte won a landslide victory to a second term, defeating Representative Prospero Nograles. Councilor Alexis Almendras, son of former senator Alejandro Almendras, placed a distant third.

Candidate	Party	Votes	%
Rodrigo Duterte (incumbent)	Nationalist People's Coalition	185,569	60.66
Prospero Nograles	Laban ng Demokratikong Pilipino	86,647	28.33
Alexis Almendras	Lakas–NUCD	32,874	10.75
Corette Saldaña	Kilusang Bagong Lipunan	803	0.26
Total		305,893	100.00
Source: COMELEC

=== Vice mayor ===
Councilor Luis Bonguyan won the vice mayoral race over fellow councilor Valentino Banzon and former councilor Exuperio Porras.

Candidate	Party	Votes	%
Luis Bonguyan	Lakas–NUCD	121,218	40.82
Valentino Banzon	Nationalist People's Coalition	83,656	28.17
Exuperio Porras	Liberal/PDP–Laban	72,067	24.27
Antonio Azarcon	Partido ng Masang Pilipino	14,532	4.89
Paterno Lomantas	People's Reform Party	5,492	1.85
Total		296,965	100.00
Source: COMELEC

=== Representatives ===
==== Davao City's 1st district ====
Incumbent Prospero Nograles of Laban ng Demokratikong Pilipino (LDP) retired to run for Mayor of Davao City. The LDP nominated Vice Mayor Dominador Zuño Jr., who was defeated by Jesus Dureza of the Nationalist People's Coalition.

Candidate	Party	Votes	%
Jesus Dureza	Nationalist People's Coalition	62,436	51.52
Dominador Zuño Jr.	Laban ng Demokratikong Pilipino	38,391	31.68
Reynaldo Teves	Koalisyong Pambansa	20,360	16.80
Total		121,187	100.00
Source: Commission on Elections

==== Davao City's 2nd district ====
Incumbent Cornelio Maskariño of Koalisyong Pambansa ran for a second term, but was defeated by Manuel Garcia of the Nationalist People's Coalition.

Candidate	Party	Votes	%
Manuel Garcia	Nationalist People's Coalition	31,710	37.04
Senforiano Alferado	Lakas–NUCD/UMDP	30,415	35.53
Liborio Lumain	Laban ng Demokratikong Pilipino	12,149	14.19
Cornelio Maskariño (incumbent)	Koalisyong Pambansa	7,855	9.18
Arnel Dayanghirang	Kilusang Bagong Lipunan	2,295	2.68
Conrado Macasa Sr.	None	1,120	1.31
Nazir Ahmad Abbas	Independent	59	0.07
Total		85,603	100.00
Source: Commission on Elections

==== Davao City's 3rd district ====
The seat was vacant after Luis Santos of Lakas ng Bansa resigned on October 27, 1987, upon being appointed as Secretary of Local Government. Elias Lopez of the Nationalist People's Coalition won the election.

Candidate	Party	Votes	%
Elias Lopez	Nationalist People's Coalition	29,904	38.83
Mariano Santos	Laban ng Demokratikong Pilipino	16,878	21.92
Sonja Rodriguez	Lakas–NUCD	15,488	20.11
Victorio Advincula	None	8,524	11.07
Ruben Robillo	Independent	6,135	7.97
Gaudencio Kintanar	Independent	82	0.11
Total		77,011	100.00
Source: Commission on Elections
