= Coronavirus Task Force =

Coronavirus Task Force may refer to:

- White House Coronavirus Task Force
- Inter-Agency Task Force for the Management of Emerging Infectious Diseases, a Philippine government task force which responded to the COVID-19 pandemic in the Philippines
