= Vicente Duterte =

Filipino politician and lawyer (1911–1968)

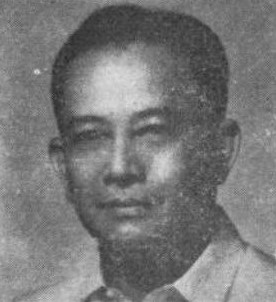
- Duterte in 1967

Secretary of General Services
- In office December 30, 1965 – February 21, 1968
- President: Ferdinand Marcos
- Preceded by: Position established
- Succeeded by: Salih Ututalum

18th Governor of Davao
- In office December 30, 1959 – December 30, 1965
- Vice Governor: Manuel Sotto
- Preceded by: Alejandro Almendras
- Succeeded by: Paciano Bangoy

Mayor of Danao, Cebu
- Acting
- In office April 18, 1945 – January 4, 1946
- Appointed by: Sergio Osmeña
- Vice Mayor: Luis Almendras

Personal details
- Born: Vicente Gonzales Duterte; November 23, 1911 Danao, Cebu, Philippine Islands
- Died: February 21, 1968 (aged 56) Davao City, Davao del Sur, Philippines
- Party: Nacionalista (1945–1968)
- Spouse: Soledad Roa
- Children: 5, including Rodrigo
- Relatives: See Duterte family
- Nickname(s): Nene, Teti

Vicente Gonzales Duterte (Tagalog pronunciation: [dʊˈtɛɾtɛ]; November 23, 1911 – February 21, 1968), also known by his nicknames Nene and Teti, was a Filipino politician, lawyer, and father of Rodrigo Duterte, the 16th president of the Philippines. He was governor of the then-unified province of Davao in 1959, succeeding Alejandro Almendras who was elected senator.

== Early life and career ==
Duterte was born in 1911 in Danao, Cebu, to Facundo Buot Duterte and Zoila Gonzáles from northern Cebu, who also traces her roots in Iloilo. He had four siblings and a half-brother.

Duterte was appointed mayor of Danao, Cebu in an acting capacity by President Sergio Osmeña during the liberation of the Philippines in 1945. He and his family moved back forth between Mindanao and the Visayas, finally settling in Davao in 1949. In 1959, Duterte was elected governor of Davao, succeeding his distant cousin and political ally Alejandro Almendras.

In 1965, Duterte was appointed Secretary of General Services by President Ferdinand Marcos. He unsuccessfully ran for Congress in the 1967 special elections for the lone district of the newly-created province of Davao del Sur. While defending himself in a court case, Duterte collapsed and died of heart failure on February 21, 1968.

== Personal life ==
Duterte was married to Soledad Duterte, a teacher whom he first met at the Bureau of Public Schools. The couple had five children: Eleanor, Rodrigo, Jocelyn, Emmanuel, and Benjamin. He was the paternal grandfather of Representative Paolo Duterte, Vice President Sara Duterte and Davao City Mayor Sebastian Duterte.

Political offices
Preceded by Alejandro Almendras	Governor of Davao; 1959–1965	Succeeded by Paciano V. Bangoy
New title	Secretary of General Services; 1965–1968	Vacant Office abolished Title next held by Jose Roño as Minister of Local Government and Community Development
