= Soledad Duterte =

Filipina teacher and activist (1916–2012)

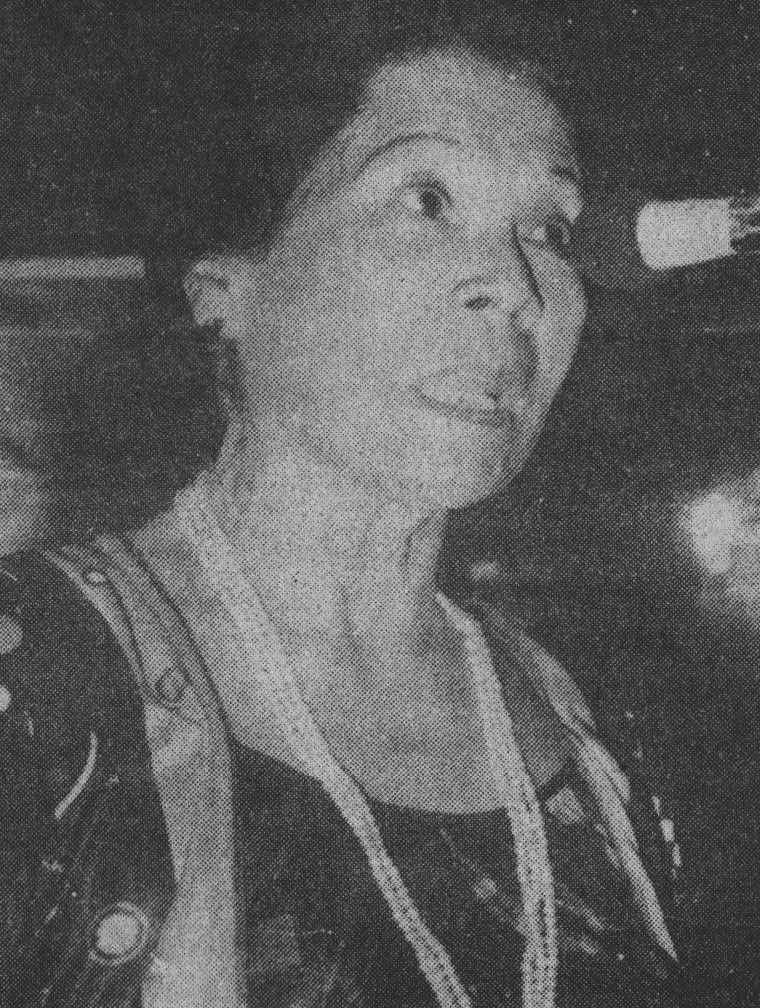
- Duterte in 1984
- Born: Soledad Gonzales Roa; November 14, 1916; Cabadbaran, Agusan, Philippine Islands
- Died: February 4, 2012 (aged 95); Davao City, Philippines
- Other name: Nanay Soling
- Occupations: Teacher; activist
- Spouse: Vicente Duterte (died 1968)
- Children: 5, including Rodrigo
- Relatives: See Duterte family

Soledad Roa-Duterte (born Soledad Gonzales Roa; November 14, 1916 – February 4, 2012) was a Filipino teacher, entrepreneur and activist. She was the mother of Rodrigo Duterte, the 16th president of the Philippines.

== Early life ==
Duterte was born Soledad Gonzales Roa on November 14, 1916, in Cabadbaran, Agusan (present-day Agusan del Norte) to Eleno Roa and Fortunata Gonzales. The Roas trace their roots to Leyte. She finished her primary and secondary education in Cabadbaran and attended the Philippine Normal School in Manila for her collegiate studies. She then entered the Bureau of Public Schools, working as a public schoolteacher. She also taught at the University of the Visayas in Danao campus.

== Career ==
In October 1966, Duterte was named board member of the Davao City chapter of the Citizen's Council for Mass Media, which aimed "to foster and protect the moral welfare of our society" through the promotion of clean and wholesome media.

Duterte, or Nanay Soling (lit. 'Mother Soling') as she is fondly called, led the Yellow Friday Movement in Davao City against the regime of President Ferdinand Marcos, leading to the People Power Revolution in 1986. She also founded and oversaw the Soledad Duterte Foundation, which conducted livelihood and skills training to the indigenous people of Marahan, near the boundary area of Bukidnon. She was also president and chairperson of the Welfare Action Foundation.

== Death ==
Duterte died at the Davao Doctors Hospital on February 4, 2012, at the age of 95.

== Personal life ==
Duterte was married to Vicente Duterte, a Cebuano lawyer whom she first met while working at the Bureau of Public Schools. After moving back and forth between Visayas and Mindanao, the Dutertes settled in the then-undivided Davao province in 1950, where Vicente served as governor. Vicente died in February 1968. The couple had five children: Eleanor; Rodrigo; the 16th president of the Philippines; Jocelyn, who made unsuccessful bids for various elective posts in Davao City; Emmanuel, who sought the city's first district seat; and Benjamin, who served as member of the Davao City Council from 1998 to 2001.

She is the paternal grandmother of Davao City Representative Paolo Duterte, Vice President Sara Duterte and Davao City Mayor Sebastian Duterte.
