= John Tracy Cagas =

Filipino politician and lawyer

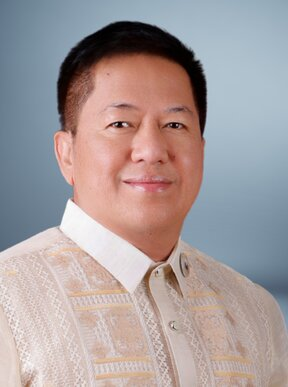
- Official portrait, 2025

Member of the House of Representatives of the Philippines from Davao del Sur's lone district
- Incumbent
- Assumed office June 30, 2022
- Preceded by: Mercedes "Didi" C. Cagas

Vice Governor of Davao del Sur
- In office June 10, 2021 – June 30, 2022
- Governor: Marc Douglas Cagas IV
- Preceded by: Marc Douglas Cagas IV
- Succeeded by: Riafe Cagas-Fernandez

Member of Davao del Sur Provincial Board from the 1st district
- In office June 30, 2013 – June 10, 2021

Member of the Digos City Council
- In office June 30, 1998 – June 30, 2001

Personal details
- Born: John Tracy Fortich Cagas; November 13, 1965 (age 60) Oroquieta, Misamis Occidental, Philippines
- Party: Lakas (2025–present)
- Other political affiliations: Nacionalista (2012–2025)
- Spouse: Maria Eunice Virtudazo (m. 1995)
- Relations: Josef Cagas (brother); Douglas Cagas (uncle); Marc Douglas Cagas IV (cousin)
- Children: 2
- Parent: Gary Cagas (father)
- Education: Cor Jesu College

John Tracy Fortich Cagas (born November 13, 1965) is a Filipino politician and lawyer who is currently serving as congressman of the lone district of Davao del Sur. Prior to serving in Congress, Cagas was a member of Davao del Sur's provincial board from 2013 to 2021, and was sworn in as the province's vice governor in June 2021 when the position was vacated.

In February 2025, Cagas was one of the 22 Nacionalista members of Congress who voted to impeach vice president Sara Duterte, and was the sole congressman from Davao Region to vote in favor of impeachment.

== Early life ==
John Tracy Cagas was born on November 13, 1965 in Oroquieta, Misamis Occidental to politician Gary Cagas (1941–2022). Cagas' brother, Josef (born 1974), is the current mayor of Digos City.

== Law career ==
Cagas became a practicing lawyer in 1992. He established a law firm in Digos called Cagas Law Office.

== Political career ==
=== Board member of Davao del Sur's 1st/lone district ===
Cagas was elected a board member of Davao del Sur's 1st district (later the lone district) in 2013.

Cagas ran for vice governor of Davao del Sur in the 2016 election, but lost to Aileen Almendras.

In October 2015, Cagas accompanied Rep. Mercedes C. Cagas in filing the certificate of candidacy (COC) of her husband, jailed Davao del Sur governor Douglas Cagas, who was detained for his alleged role in the murder of journalist Nestor Bedolido. After the death of governor Cagas in June 2021, John Tracy was sworn in as vice governor of Davao del Sur on account of him being the senior member of the provincial board.

=== House of Representatives ===
Cagas was elected congressman of Davao del Sur's lone district in the 2022 elections, defeating Hugpong ng Pagbabago candidate and provincial board member Erwin Soriano Llanos. As congressman, he served as a vice chairman of the House Special Committee on the East ASEAN Growth Area.

On February 5, 2025, Cagas was among the 22 Nacionalista members who voted to impeach vice president Sara Duterte, finding the impeachment complaint to be "sufficient in form and substance" and considering it his "sworn duty to sign it and for the respondent to answer it in the impeachment trial". Out of the 11 representatives from Davao Region, he is the lone congressman to vote in favor of Duterte's impeachment. Several of Cagas' electoral tarpaulins in Davao del Sur were defaced by Duterte supporters as a result of his vote. Arvin Malaza, Cagas' independent opponent in the 2025 congressional election, criticized Cagas decision while speaking at the February 22 launch of the Protect VP Sara Coalition in Davao City.

== Personal life ==
Cagas currently resides in Digos with his wife Maria Eunice Virtudazo and their two children. He is also a reservist of the Armed Forces of the Philippines with the rank of lieutenant colonel. He previously served as the former commanding officer of the 1101st Ready Reserve Infantry Battalion based in Davao del Sur.
