= Yvonne Roña Cagas =

Filipino politician (1990)

The Honorable Yvonne Roña Cagas
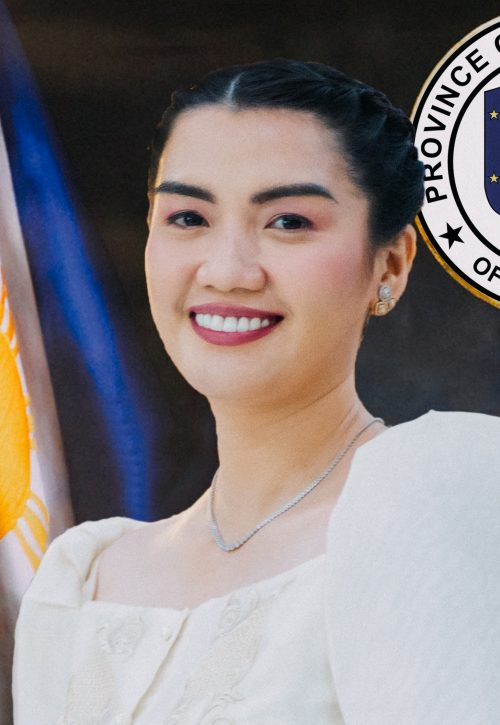

Governor of Davao del Sur
- Incumbent
- Assumed office June 30, 2022
- Vice Governor: Riafe Cagas-Fernandez (2022–2025); Marc Douglas Cagas IV (2025–present)
- Preceded by: Marc Douglas Cagas IV

Personal details
- Born: Yvonne Roña; March 13, 1990 (age 36)
- Party: Nacionalista
- Spouse: Marc Douglas Cagas IV
- Relations: Douglas Cagas (father-in-law)
- Children: 3
- Occupation: Politician

Yvonne Roña Cagas (born March 13, 1990) is a Filipino politician who has served as Governor of Davao del Sur since 2022. She is married to Marc Douglas Cagas IV, who also served as governor of Davao del Sur.

== See also ==
- List of current Philippine governors
