= Davao del Sur Provincial Board =

Legislative body of the province of Davao del Sur, Philippines

Davao del Sur Provincial Board Sangguniang Panlalawigan ng Davao del Sur

Type
- Type: Unicameral
- Term limits: 3 terms (9 years)

Leadership
- Presiding Davao del Sur Provincial Board: Marc Douglas Cagas IV, Nacionalista since June 30, 2025

Structure
- Seats: 14 board members 1 ex officio presiding Davao del Sur Provincial Board
- Political groups: Nacionalista (6) Akbayan (1) Independent (2) Nonpartisan (3)
- Length of term: 3 years
- Authority: Local Government Code of the Philippines

Elections
- Voting system: Multiple non-transferable vote (regular members); Indirect election (ex officio members)
- Last election: May 9, 2022
- Next election: May 2025

Meeting place
- Davao del Sur Provincial Capitol, Digos

The Davao del Sur Provincial Board is the Sangguniang Panlalawigan (provincial legislature) of the Philippine province of Davao del Sur.

The members are elected via plurality-at-large voting: the province is divided into two districts, each having five seats. A voter votes up to five names, with the top five candidates per district being elected. The vice governor is the ex officio presiding Davao del Sur Provincial Board, and only votes to break ties. The vice governor is elected via the plurality voting system province-wide.

The districts used in appropriation of members are not coextensive with the legislative district of Davao del Sur; unlike congressional representation which is at-large, Davao del Sur is divided into two districts for representation in the Sangguniang Panlalawigan.

Aside from the regular members, the board also includes the provincial federation presidents of the Liga ng mga Barangay (ABC, from its old name "Association of Barangay Captains"), the Sangguniang Kabataan (SK, youth councils) and the Philippine Councilors League (PCL). Davao de Sur's provincial board also has a reserved seat for its indigenous people (IPMR).

== Apportionment ==
Elections	Seats per district		Ex officio seats	Reserved seats	Total seats
Elections	1st	2nd	Ex officio seats	Reserved seats	Total seats
until 2022	5	5	3	–	14
2022–present	5	5	3	1	14

== List of members ==
=== Current members ===
These are the members after the 2025 local elections and 2023 barangay and SK elections:

- Vice Governor: Marc Douglas Cagas IV (Nacionalista)

Seat	Board member	Party	Start of term	End of term
1st district	Erwin Llanos	Independent	June 30, 2025	June 30, 2028
1st district	Shiela B. Cagas	Nacionalista	June 30, 2022	June 30, 2028
1st district	Reynaldo T. Aballe	Nacionalista	June 30, 2025	June 30, 2028
1st district	Rey Q. Ayo	Nacionalista	June 30, 2022	June 30, 2028
1st district	Maria P. Almedras	Nacionalista	June 30, 2025	June 30, 2028
2nd district	Dyane Giduquio-Idulsa	Nacionalista	June 30, 2025	June 30, 2028
2nd district	Gladys A. Razonable-Gascon	Nacionalista	June 30, 2025	June 30, 2028
2nd district	Carmelo de los Cientos III	Nacionalista	June 30, 2019	June 30, 2028
2nd district	Kyra Angela T. Valentin	Nacionalista	June 30, 2025	June 30, 2028
2nd district	Mark Joel A. Gallardo	Nacionalista	June 30, 2022	June 30, 2028
ABC	Oscar Bucol	Nonpartisan	July 30, 2018	January 1, 2023
PCL	Peter Paul T. Valentin	Nacionalista	August 11, 2025	June 30, 2028
SK	Justin Fernandez Siao	Nonpartisan	November 1, 2023	November 1, 2025
IPMR	Bae Norma Rivera	Nonpartisan	June 30, 2019	July 1, 2022

=== Vice Governor ===
Election year	Name	Party	Ref.
2016	Aileen C. Almendras	NPC	
2019	Marc Douglas Cagas IV (until 2021); John Tracy Cagas (from 2021)	Nacionalista	
2022	Riafe M. Cagas	Nacionalista	
2025	Marc Douglas Cagas IV	Nacionalista	

=== 1st District ===
- Population (2024):

Election year	Member (party)	Member (party)	Member (party)	Member (party)	Member (party)	Ref.
2016	Dondon Llanos (NPC)	Lani M. Gabutero (Liberal)	Erwin Llanos (NPC)	Victoriano R. Cadungog (NPC)	Simplicio Latasa (Nacionalista)	
2019	John Tracy F. Cagas (Nacionalista)	Lani M. Gabutero (HNP)	Erwin Llanos (HNP)	Victoriano R. Cadungog (HNP)	Simplicio Latasa (Independent)	
2022	Shiela B. Cagas (PROMDI)	Rey Q. Ayo (PDP–Laban)	Dr. Francisco B. Tongos (Nacionalista)	Victoriano R. Cadungog (Nacionalista)	Simplicio Latasa (Nacionalista)	
2025	Shiela B. Cagas (Nacionalista Party)	Rey Q. Ayo (Nacionalista Party)	Reynaldo T. Aballe (Nacionalista Party)	Marla P. Almendras (Nacionalista Party)	Erwin Llanos (Independent)	

=== 2nd District ===
- Population (2024):

Election year	Member (party)	Member (party)	Member (party)	Member (party)	Member (party)	Ref.
2016	Lanier R. Cadungog (NPC)	Willie S. Villegas (Liberal)	Anna Margarita A. Razonable (NPC)	Merlin B. Bello (Nacionalista)	Marivic Caminero-Diamante (Nacionalista)	
2019	Lanier R. Cadungog (HNP)	Carmelo R. delos Cientos III (Nacionalista)	Anna Margarita A. Razonable (Independent)	Merlin B. Bello (Nacionalista)	Arvin B. Malaza (Independent)	
2022	Lanier R. Cadungog (Lakas)	Carmelo R. delos Cientos III (Nacionalista)	Anna Margarita A. Razonable (Nacionalista)	Merlin B. Bello (Nacionalista)	Mark Joel A. Gallardo (Nacionalista)	
2025	Gladys A. Razonable-Gascon (Nacionalista)	Carmelo R. delos Cientos III (Nacionalista)	Kyra Angela T. Valentin (Nacionalista)	Dyane Giduquio-Idulsa (Nacionalista)	Mark Joel A. Gallardo (Nacionalista)	
