= Jesus Dureza =

Filipino lawyer, consultant, journalist and politician

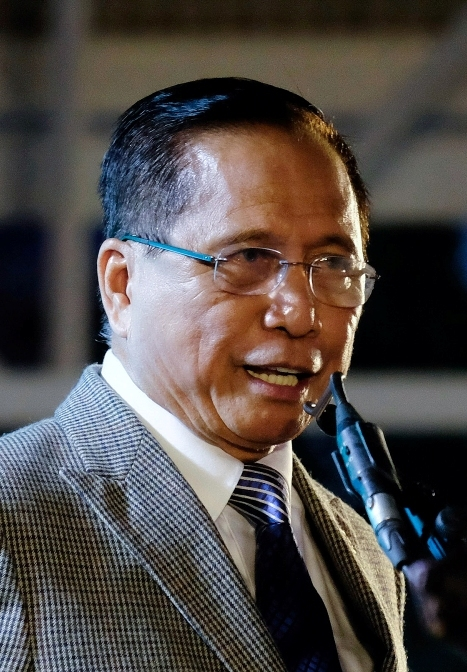
- Dureza in February 2017

Presidential Adviser on the Peace Process
- In office June 30, 2016 – November 27, 2018
- President: Rodrigo Duterte
- Preceded by: Teresita Quintos Deles
- Succeeded by: Carlito Galvez Jr.
- In office January 2006 – June 2008
- President: Gloria Macapagal Arroyo
- Preceded by: Teresita Quintos Deles
- Succeeded by: Hermogenes Esperon

Chairman of the Mindanao Development Authority
- In office March 2, 2010 – September 9, 2010
- President: Gloria Macapagal Arroyo; Benigno Aquino III
- Succeeded by: Luwalhati Antonino

Press Secretary
- In office June 16, 2008 – January 31, 2009
- President: Gloria Macapagal Arroyo
- Preceded by: Ignacio Bunye
- Succeeded by: Cerge Remonde

Presidential Assistant for Mindanao
- In office February 1998 – June 1998
- President: Fidel Ramos

Member of the Philippine House of Representatives from Davao City's 1st District
- In office June 30, 1992 – June 30, 1995
- Preceded by: Prospero Nograles
- Succeeded by: Prospero Nograles
- In office June 30, 1987 – June 16, 1989
- Preceded by: District established
- Succeeded by: Prospero Nograles

Personal details
- Born: Jesus Gestuveo Dureza; December 24, 1947 (age 78) Guimbal, Iloilo, Philippines
- Party: NPC (1992–present)
- Other political affiliations: Independent (1987–1992)
- Spouse: Elizabeth Salutillo
- Education: Ateneo de Davao University (BA, LL.B)
- Occupation: Politician, publisher, consultant, journalist
- Profession: Lawyer

Jesus "Jess" Gestuveo Dureza (born December 24, 1947) is a Filipino lawyer, consultant, journalist and politician from Davao City, Philippines. He was the adviser on the peace process to President Rodrigo Duterte from 2016 to 2018 and is the Founding Chairman of Advocacy MindaNow Foundation, a group advocating for peace in Mindanao. He has held various appointive positions in past administrations including the chairmanship of the Mindanao Development Authority, the chairmanship of the Government Peace Negotiating Panel for Talks with the Moro Islamic Liberation Front, and Presidential Assistant for Mindanao. He is also a former Representative of the 1st District of Davao City in the Philippine House of Representatives.

== Early life and education ==
Dureza was born in Guimbal, Iloilo on December 24, 1947. His father, Martin Dureza, hails from Janiuay and took part in the local guerrilla warfare against the Japanese army during World War II. He was one year old when his family migrated to Davao. He finished elementary as the class valedictorian at Guihing Elementary School in Hagonoy in 1959. He attended the Holy Cross of Digos High School (now Cor Jesu College) in Digos where he was classmates with the future President Rodrigo Duterte and graduated with honors in 1963.

Dureza then enrolled at the Ateneo de Davao University in Davao City where he graduated cum laude with a Bachelor of Arts degree in 1967. He earned his law degree from the same university in 1973. He placed 10th in the Philippine Bar Examination the same year.

== Career ==
Dureza had a career in journalism before entering politics. In 1972, while a law student at the Ateneo, he worked as a radio host for RMN Davao and as Davao correspondent for The Manila Times. After finishing law, he was hired as an editor for Mindanao Times, as a correspondent for Manila Bulletin, and as television presenter of "Brainstorm" in Davao City. He was also President of the Davao Press Club.

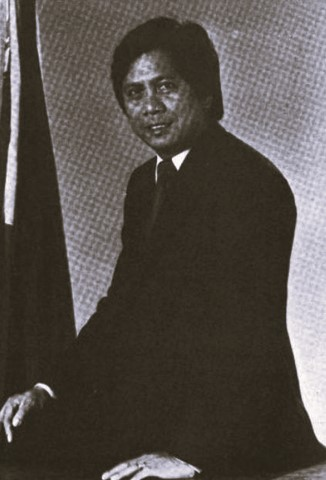
Dureza official portrait during the 8th Congress.

Dureza then joined politics in 1987 after being elected as Congressman of the newly established First District of Davao City. He served in the Corazon Aquino administration after his term in Congress as Director of the Philippine Coconut Authority in 1989. In 1992, he was again elected as Davao City Representative.

Dureza was appointed by Fidel Ramos as his presidential assistant for Mindanao and chairman of the Mindanao Economic Development Council. From 1998 to 2000, he served as the official spokesperson for the former president. In 2002, he founded the Advocacy MindaNow Foundation.

During the Gloria Arroyo administration, he was appointed as Chairman of the GRP Panel for Talks with the Moro Islamic Liberation Front in 2003, Chairman of Mindanao Economic Development Council in 2006, Presidential Adviser on the Peace Process in 2008, Press Secretary in 2009, and Presidential Adviser on Mindanao also in 2009. His last appointive position with the Arroyo government was as Chairman of the Mindanao Development Authority in 2010.

Before returning to government service in 2016, Dureza was a senior partner at the Rama Dureza Abarquez Law Firm. He was also the publisher of Mindanao Times, Chairman of the Philippine Press Institute, Director of Maple Tree Foundation for Mountain Communities, and Consultant for SM Investments Corporation.

Dureza was awarded the Presidential Medal of Merit by President Fidel Ramos in June 1998. He is also a recipient of the Datu Bago Award (1983), the highest award given to a Davaoeño.

He served as Presidential Adviser on the Peace Process of the Philippines under the Rodrigo Duterte administration from June 30, 2016, to November 27, 2018.
