= Mindanao Times =

- Format: Tabloid
- Publisher: Jesus Dureza
- Editor-in-chief: Joel Escovilla
- Founded: 1946
- Language: English
- Headquarters: Davao City
- Website: www.mindanaotimes.com.ph

Mindanao Times is the oldest extant community newspaper in Mindanao, southern part of the Philippines. It was founded in 1946 with editorial and business office located at C. Bangoy cor. Palma Gil Sts., Davao City.

== History ==
Before World War II, the publication was owned and published by the Japanese as Davao Times. After the liberation of Davao, the publication was assumed by the Philippine Civil Affair Unit (PICAU) No. 29, of the 24th Division of the U.S. Army.

On January 2, 1946, a group of Filipinos headed by Atty. Guillermo E.Torres and Pedro M. Lat bought the weekly and renamed it Mindanao Times. In 1946, the Mindanao Times became a daily. In addition to local news and features, the eight-column spread paper carried world news dispatched by the United Press international, feature articles, and comic strips from the King Features Syndicate, and national news gathered by the Philippine News Service.

However, the daily lasted for only about a year. A worldwide shortage of newsprint and other materials due to the Korean War and losses suffered by some news bureaus forced the Times to revert to a weekly. Shortly thereafter, Atty. Torres bought the newspaper from Mindanao Times Inc. and continued the publication of the newspaper under a new corporation known as Mindanao Publishers Inc. It went on as a thrice a week newspaper for years until it reinstated its daily run again on September 2, 1997. New sections were added for a wider scope of information. The sections include sports, entertainment, tourism, health, science and technology and lifestyle.

In September 2011, Mindanao Times relaunched its website; some of its most notable features include FlippingBook, an application that allows users to read the digital version of the newspaper as they would in print. Access to digital issues is free of charge.

Mindanao Times also continues to maintain a strong presence online through social networking sites Facebook and Twitter.

== Staff ==
The Mindanao Times Editorial department is headed by Amalia Bandiola-Cabusao, who has been the editor in chief since June 2003. Previous to the post, she was managing editor of the paper. She is also the Secretary of the Board of Trustees of the Philippine Press Institute and the Mindanao Representative of this nationwide media organization and sits as member of the board of the Mindanao News and Information Cooperative Center (MNICC), a news organization she helped organize in 2001.

Carmelito Q. Francisco is the managing editor since 2003. He is a veteran reporter and has worked as editor in various local newspapers in the cities of Davao and General Santos. He also writes business stories for the national paper Business World.

Joel B. Escovilla is the newspaper’s associate editor. Used to be a correspondent of the Philippine Daily Inquirer covering the business beat, he is a member of the MNICC. Escovilla participated in the Southeast Asean Press Alliance (SEAPA) Fellowship in summer of 2007 where he covered the Shan people in Chiang Mai, Thailand.

Chris Fabian is the entertainment editor, and is also the paper’s de facto researcher.

Esperidion "Jon" Develos is the sports editor.
