= Davao del Sur's 1st congressional district =

Legislative district of the Philippines

Davao del Sur's 1st congressional district is an obsolete congressional district in Davao del Sur for the House of Representatives of the Philippines from 1987 to 2016. The district encompassed seven northern local government units of the previously undivided province bordering Davao City and includes Digos, the provincial capital. It was created ahead of the 1987 Philippine House of Representatives elections following the ratification of the 1987 constitution which established two districts for the province and another three districts for Davao City. Prior to the 1987 apportionment, Davao del Sur residents elected their representatives to the national legislatures on a provincewide basis through the Davao del Sur's at-large congressional district. The district was last contested at the 2013 Philippine House of Representatives elections. Davao del Sur returned to electing its representatives at-large in 2016 after losing most of its southern territory to the province of Davao Occidental created by Republic Act No. 10360 on January 4, 2013.

== Representation history ==
#	Image	Member	Term of office		Congress	Party	Electoral history	Constituent LGUs
#	Image	Member	Start	End	Congress	Party	Electoral history	Constituent LGUs
=== Davao del Sur's 1st district for the House of Representatives of the Philippines ===
District created February 2, 1987 from Davao del Sur's at-large district.
1		Juanito G. Camasura Jr.	June 30, 1987	June 30, 1992	8th	PDP–Laban	Elected in 1987.	1987–2016; Bansalan, Digos, Hagonoy, Magsaysay, Matanao, Padada, Santa Cruz
2		Alejandro Almendras	June 30, 1992	June 30, 1995	9th	Lakas–CMD	Elected in 1992.	1987–2016; Bansalan, Digos, Hagonoy, Magsaysay, Matanao, Padada, Santa Cruz
3		Alejandro Almendras Jr.	June 30, 1995	June 30, 1998	10th	Lakas–CMD	Elected in 1995.	1987–2016; Bansalan, Digos, Hagonoy, Magsaysay, Matanao, Padada, Santa Cruz
4		Douglas Cagas	June 30, 1998	June 30, 2007	11th	LAMMP	Elected in 1998.	1987–2016; Bansalan, Digos, Hagonoy, Magsaysay, Matanao, Padada, Santa Cruz
4		Douglas Cagas	June 30, 1998	June 30, 2007	12th	NPC	Re-elected in 2001.	1987–2016; Bansalan, Digos, Hagonoy, Magsaysay, Matanao, Padada, Santa Cruz
4		Douglas Cagas	June 30, 1998	June 30, 2007	13th	NPC	Re-elected in 2004.	1987–2016; Bansalan, Digos, Hagonoy, Magsaysay, Matanao, Padada, Santa Cruz
5		Marc Douglas Cagas IV	June 30, 2007	June 30, 2013	14th	Nacionalista	Elected in 2007.	1987–2016; Bansalan, Digos, Hagonoy, Magsaysay, Matanao, Padada, Santa Cruz
5		Marc Douglas Cagas IV	June 30, 2007	June 30, 2013	15th	Nacionalista	Re-elected in 2010.	1987–2016; Bansalan, Digos, Hagonoy, Magsaysay, Matanao, Padada, Santa Cruz
6		Mercedes C. Cagas	June 30, 2013	June 30, 2016	16th	Nacionalista	Elected in 2013. Redistricted to Davao del Sur's at-large district.	1987–2016; Bansalan, Digos, Hagonoy, Magsaysay, Matanao, Padada, Santa Cruz
District dissolved into Davao del Sur's at-large district.

== See also ==
- Legislative districts of Davao del Sur
