= Caga =

Caga or CagA may refer to:

- CagA or cytotoxin-associated antigen A
- Çağa, Güdül, a neighbourhood in Güdül, Ankara Province, Turkey
- Cagas, surname
- Enga language, a language of Papua New Guinea
