= Davao del Sur's at-large congressional district =

Legislative district of the Philippines

- Constituency for the House of Representatives of the Philippines
- Location of Davao del Sur within the Philippines
- Province: Davao del Sur
- Region: Davao Region
- Population: 680,481 (2020)
- Electorate: 457,073 (2022)
- Area: 2,163.98 km^{2} (835.52 sq mi)

Current constituency
- Created: 1968
- Representative: John Tracy Cagas
- Political party: Lakas
- Congressional bloc: Majority

Davao del Sur's at-large congressional district is the sole congressional district of the Philippines in the province of Davao del Sur. It was originally created by the 1967 division of the old Davao province and was eliminated following the 1972 abolition of the House of Representatives. The district was restored as a plural member district for the 1984 national parliament known as the Batasang Pambansa but was reconfigured after Davao City gained its own representation. It was eliminated again following the 1987 reapportionment that created an additional district. The district's current configuration dates from 2013 when Davao del Sur lost a seat following the creation of the province of Davao Occidental covering much of its 2nd district. The district is represented in the 20th Congress by John Tracy Cagas of the Lakas–CMD (Lakas).

== Representation history ==
#	Term of office		Congress	Single seat							
#	Start	End	Congress	Image	Member	Party	Electoral history				
=== Davao del Sur's at-large district for the House of Representatives of the Philippines ===
District created May 8, 1967 from Davao's at-large district.
1	January 22, 1968	September 23, 1972	6th		Artemio A. Loyola	Nacionalista	Elected in 1967 special election.				
1	January 22, 1968	September 23, 1972	7th		Artemio A. Loyola	Nacionalista	Re-elected in 1969. Removed from office after imposition of martial law.				
District dissolved into the ten-seat Region XI's at-large district for the Interim Batasang Pambansa.
#	Term of office		Batasang Pambansa	Seat A				Seat B			
#	Start	End	Batasang Pambansa	Image	Member	Party	Electoral history	Image	Member	Party	Electoral history
=== Davao del Sur's at-large district for the Regular Batasang Pambansa ===
District re-created February 1, 1984.
–	July 23, 1984	March 25, 1986	2nd		Alejandro Almendras	KBL	Elected in 1984.		Douglas R. Cagas	PDP–Laban	Elected in 1984.
District dissolved into Davao del Sur's 1st and 2nd districts.
#	Term of office		Congress	Single seat				Seats eliminated			
#	Start	End	Congress	Image	Member	Party	Electoral history	Seats eliminated			
=== Davao del Sur's at-large district for the House of Representatives of the Philippines ===								Seats eliminated			
District re-created January 14, 2013.								Seats eliminated			
2	June 30, 2016	June 30, 2022	17th		Mercedes C. Cagas	Nacionalista	Redistricted from the 1st district and re-elected in 2016.	Seats eliminated			
2	June 30, 2016	June 30, 2022	18th		Mercedes C. Cagas	Nacionalista	Re-elected in 2019.	Seats eliminated			
3	June 30, 2022	Incumbent	19th		John Tracy F. Cagas	Nacionalista	Elected in 2022.	Seats eliminated			
3	June 30, 2022	Incumbent	20th		John Tracy F. Cagas	Lakas	Re-elected in 2025.	Seats eliminated			

== Election results ==
=== 2025 ===
Candidate	Party	Votes	%
John Tracy Cagas (incumbent)	Nacionalista Party	193,123	70.61
Arvin Malaza	Independent	80,389	29.39
Total		273,512	100.00
Registered voters/turnout		465,227	–
Nacionalista Party hold			
Source: Commission on Elections

=== 2022 ===
2022 Philippine House of Representatives elections
Party	Candidate	Votes	%
Nacionalista	John Tracy Cagas	214,741	
Hugpong	Erwin S. Llanos	85,109	
Independent	Mina King Almendras	13,927	
Independent	Brando Agbon	3,406	
Total votes			100.00
Nacionalista hold			

=== 2019 ===
2019 Philippine House of Representatives elections
Party	Candidate	Votes	%
Nacionalista	Mercedes Cagas (incumbent)	178,491	
Hugpong	Juanito Morales	80,961	
Independent	Ronald Banac	4,367	
Independent	Brando Agbon	2,788	
Total votes			100.00
Nacionalista hold			

== See also ==
- Legislative districts of Davao del Sur
