= Governor of Davao del Sur =

Local chief executive

Provincial Governor of Davao del Sur
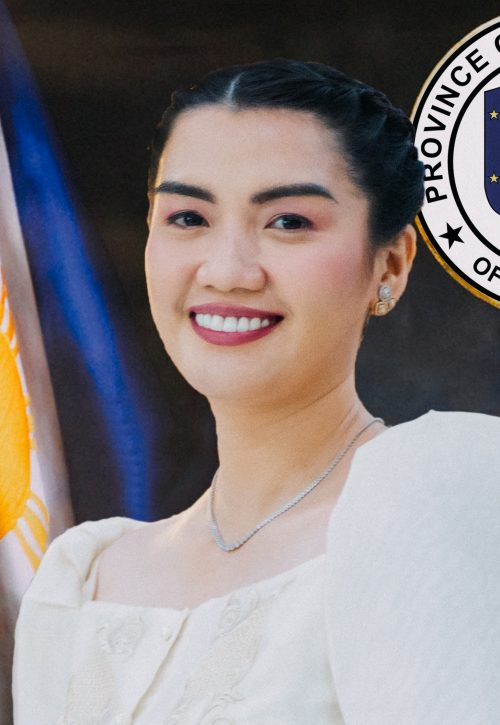
- Incumbent; Yvonne Roña Cagas since June 30, 2022
- Appointer: Elected via popular vote
- Term length: 3 years
- Inaugural holder: Ramon delos Cientos Sr.
- Formation: 1967

The governor of Davao del Sur (Filipino: Punong Panlalawigan ng Davao del Sur), is the chief executive of the provincial government of Davao del Sur.

== Provincial Governors (1967–present) ==
No.	Image	Governor	Party	Term
1		Ramon de los Cientos Sr.	Nacionalista	1967–1971
2		Nonito Llanos Sr.	Liberal	1971–1986
3		Alejandro Almendras	KBL	1986–1988
4		Douglas Cagas	PDP–Laban	1988–1992
5		Rogelio Llanos	PDP–Laban	1992–2001
6		Reynerio Llanos	NPC	2001–2002
7		Benjamin Bautista Jr.	Liberal	2002–2007
(4)		Douglas Cagas	Lakas	2007–2013
(4)		Douglas Cagas	Nacionalista	2007–2013
8		Claude Bautista	Liberal	2013–2016
(4)		Douglas Cagas	PDP–Laban	2016–2021
9		Marc Douglas Cagas IV	Nacionalista	2021–2022
10		Yvonne Roña Cagas	Nacionalista	2022–present
