= Inter-Agency Task Force for the Management of Emerging Infectious Diseases =

Philippine government agency

Task force overview
- Formed: May 26, 2014; 12 years ago (official creation); March 9, 2020; 6 years ago (activated for COVID-19 pandemic)
- Dissolved: July 22, 2023; 3 years ago (inactive; suspended operations)
- Jurisdiction: Philippines
- Task force executives: Rodrigo Duterte, overall chairperson (March 15, 2020 - June 30, 2022); Francisco Duque III, chairperson (March 15, 2020 - June 30, 2022); Karlo Nograles, spokesperson (March 16 – April 23, 2020; November 16, 2021 — March 7, 2022) and co-chairperson (until March 7, 2022); Roy Cimatu, co-chairperson (March 16, 2020 - February 18, 2022); Harry Roque, spokesperson (April 23, 2020 – November 15, 2021); Martin Andanar, spokesperson (March 8 - June 30, 2022); Bongbong Marcos, overall chairperson
- Child agencies: National Task Force Against COVID-19; Joint Task Force COVID-19 Shield
- Key document: Executive Order No. 168, s. 2014

The Inter-Agency Task Force for the Management of Emerging Infectious Diseases (IATF-EID) (Note: Also referred to as the Inter-Agency Task Force on Emerging Infectious Diseases and Inter-Agency Task Force (IATF).) is an inactive (Note: As of July 2023, the task force was deactivated following the withdrawal of the COVID-19 state of public health emergency in the country.) task force organized by the executive of the government of the Philippines to respond to affairs concerning emerging infectious diseases in the country.

== History ==
The IATF-EID was created through Executive Order No. 168 issued by President Benigno Aquino III in 2014. It was organized as the government's instrument to assess, monitor, contain, control and prevent the spread of any potential epidemic in the Philippines.

== Mandate ==
An inter-sectoral collaboration to establish preparedness and ensure efficient government response to assess, monitor, contain, control, and prevent the spread of any potential epidemic in the Philippines.

=== COVID-19 pandemic ===
The IATF-EID convened in January 2020 to address the growing viral outbreak in Wuhan, China. They made a resolution to manage the spreading of the new virus, which was known at the time as 2019 novel coronavirus (2019-nCoV) and eventually renamed to severe acute respiratory syndrome coronavirus 2 (SARS-CoV-2), the virus that causes COVID-19. On March 9, 2020, President Duterte called the IATF-EID amidst the rising cases of COVID-19 in the Philippines, after declaring a state of public health emergency on the disease.

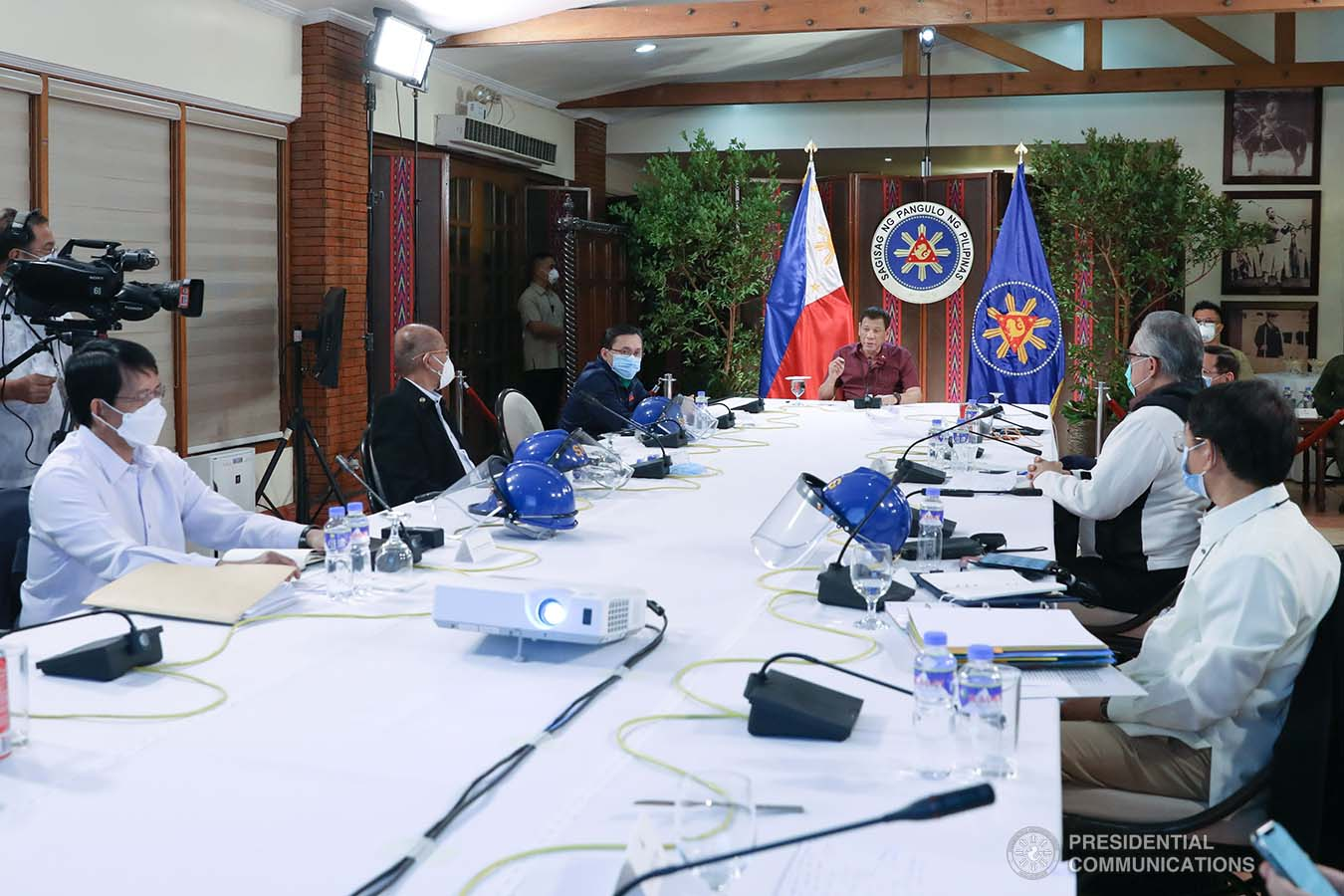
President Rodrigo Duterte meets with members of the IATF-EID on May 19, 2020

On March 25, 2020, the IATF-EID revealed a National Action Plan (NAP) to slow down the spread of COVID-19. The NAP was created to effectively and efficiently implement and decentralize the system of managing the COVID-19 pandemic. In addition, the IATF-EID created the National Task Force Against COVID-19 headed by Department of National Defense Secretary Delfin Lorenzana, which handles the operational command. At the same time, the IATF-EID became the "policy-making body of operations" while the National Incident Command administers the daily concerns and operations.

The Joint Task Force COVID-19 Shield (JTF-CV Shield) was a task force intended to enforce quarantine protocols in border checkpoints and streets, and maintain peace, order, and security throughout the country to help control the spread of COVID-19. The task force is composed of the Philippine National Police (PNP), the Armed Forces of the Philippines (AFP), the Philippine Coast Guard (PCG), the Bureau of Fire Protection (BFP), and Barangay tanods.

To be able to respond to more localized issues and concerns, Regional Inter-Agency Task Force in their respective regions were organized. Local Government Units (LGU’s) in the provinces, cities, municipalities, and barangays were Local Inter-Agency Task Forces chaired by the Local Chief Executives and Barangay Captains/Chairmen were organized.

Following the withdrawal of the State of Public Health Emergency on COVID-19 on July 22, 2023, the task force was deactivated.

== Composition ==
The IATF-EID is composed of the following executive departments and agencies:

- Chair: Department of Health
- Co-Chair:
  - Department of the Interior and Local Government
- Members
  - Department of Agriculture
  - Department of Budget and Management
  - Department of Education
  - Department of Finance
  - Department of Foreign Affairs
  - Department of Information and Communications Technology
  - Department of Justice
  - Department of Labor and Employment
  - Department of Migrant Workers
  - Department of National Defense
  - Department of Public Works and Highways
  - Department of Science and Technology
  - Department of Social Welfare and Development
  - Department of Tourism
  - Department of Trade and Industry
  - Department of Transportation
  - Office of the Executive Secretary
  - Presidential Communications Office
  - Presidential Management Staff
  - Office of the Special Assistant to the President
  - Commission on Higher Education
  - Technical Education and Skills Development Authority
  - National Economic and Development Authority
  - Office of the Chief Presidential Legal Counsel
  - Civil Service Commission
  - National Security Council
  - National Disaster Risk Reduction and Management Council

The Joint Task Force COVID-19 Shield was composed of the following who ensured that IATF Guidelines/Protocols were strictly enforced.

- Lead Agency: Philippine National Police
- Members:
  - Armed Forces of the Philippines
  - Bureau of Fire Protection
  - Philippine Coast Guard
  - Office of Civil Defense
  - All local government units

== Legal actions ==
The resolutions issued by the IATF-EID in relation to the COVID-19 pandemic were the subject of petitions separately filed in 2022 by Jose Montemayor Jr., Nicanor Perlas III, and the Passengers and Riders Organization (Pasahero) Inc. The petitioners questioned the constitutionality of directives issued by the IATF-EID, as well as by government agencies and local government units, particularly Makati, arguing that these violated right to life and liberty without due process of law, hindered right to travel, and are discriminatory against the unvaccinated.

On July 11, 2023, the Supreme Court en banc unanimously dismissed these petitions which had been consolidated, thus upholding the constitutionality of the regulations.
