= Zamzamin Ampatuan =

Filipino politician

Datu Zamzamin Lumenda Ampatuan is a career bureaucrat in the Philippines.

His parents, Datu Ishak Ampatuan and Bai Puti Lumenda, were former municipal and provincial officials of Maguindanao. His brother Yacob Ampatuan currently serves as mayor of Rajah Buayan.

He is a descendant of Shariff Ampatuan, grandson of Syedona Mustafa, a Sufi missionary, which propagated moderate Islam in the Upper Cotabato Valley of Southern Philippines.

However rooted in spiritual and ethical traditions, the public image of the Ampatuan clan, to which he belonged, was tainted by the infamous Maguindanao massacre. Authorities pointed to Andal Ampatuan Jr. a.ka. "Datu Unsay", as the culprit. Datu Unsay's brothers and father, Datu Andal Ampatuan, were detained when Martial law briefly took effect in Maguindanao as an aftermath of the massacre.

Datu Zamzamin have helped tone down the tension by helping convince Datu Unsay to submit to due process of law. He also provided advice to government authorities on how to handle the post-massacre situation to ease the impact on the lives of ordinary people in Maguindanao.

A civil engineer by profession and the first Filipino Muslim who have attained the highest rank in the Philippine civil service, he held various posts as Undersecretary. He once headed the premier national agency attending to Muslim affairs where he gained prominence as a credible public servant and as a leader of Muslims in the Philippines. Datu Zamzamin was appointed by President Gloria Macapagal Arroyo as the Lead Convenor of the National Anti-Poverty Commission. He moved back to career positions such as undersecretary of Department of Agrarian Reform and Department of Energy. In between, he was chief executive officer of government corporations such as Southern Philippines Development Authority and the Strategic Investments Development Corporation.

Before joining national government, Datu Zamzamin served in international organizations. In 1998, he was Programme Manager of the United Nations Multi-Donor Programme for the Southern Philippines Zone of Peace and Development. Thereafter, he served as Training Expert for the post-conflict project of the International Labour Organization to help former combatants of the Moro National Liberation Front. He represented the Philippines at the UNESCAP Committee on Poverty where he served as chair for a one-year term. He has helped promote in Central Asian countries, the use of Community Based Monitoring System, a poverty tracking tool.

In 2010 Philippine general election, Datu Zamzamin tried his luck in politics, having accepted the nomination as first nominee of the Adhikain ng mga Dakilang Anak Maharlika (ADAM) party-list. However, their party lost.

From 2013 to December 2019, he served as mayor of Rajah Buayan.

In December 2019, President Rodrigo Duterte appointed him as Undersecretary for Special Concerns and for the Bangsamoro Autonomous Region in Muslim Mindanao of Department of Agriculture.

He is currently doing a basic role as community leader and development advocate for indigenous peoples in Mindanao.
