= PBA Partylist =

Political party in the Philippines

PBA
- — Philippine partylist —
- Full name: Puwersa ng Bayaning Atleta
- Chairperson: Jericho Nograles
- President: Mark Aeron Sambar
- Sector(s) represented: Sports
- Headquarters: Quezon City, Philippines

Current representation (20th Congress)
- Seats in the House of Representatives: 0 / 3 (Out of 63 party-list seats)
- Representative(s): Migs Nograles

Website
- pbapartylist.org

Puwersa ng Bayaning Atleta (transl. Force of the Heroic Athlete), commonly known as the PBA Partylist, is a party-list organization in the House of Representatives of the Philippines. It represents the interests of Filipino sportspeople, advocating for policies and programs that support athletes and promote sports development nationwide.

== History ==
The PBA Partylist first participated in the 2007 elections but failed to secure a seat in Congress.

In the 2010 elections, the organization gained significant attention when it was endorsed by renowned professional boxer and national icon Manny Pacquiao, who served as its chairman at the time. During the campaign, PBA Partylist spent ₱80 million, the highest among all party-list groups, though still within the legal spending limit of ₱3 per registered voter (or ₱150 million). The group successfully won a seat in the 15th Congress. During this term, PBA Partylist filed a bill proposing the creation of a **Department of Sports**, but the proposal lapsed due to time constraints.

The organization lost its representation in Congress after failing to secure a seat in the 2013 elections. However, it regained representation in the 17th Congress after winning two seats in the 2016 elections.

=== Controversies ===
In February 2024, the PBA Partylist faced controversy after its members were accused of engaging in bribery in Davao City during their campaign for Constitutional reform in the Philippines through the People's Initiative. Witnesses claimed that the group used deceptive tactics to gather signatures for the initiative, leading to public outcry and calls for investigation.

== Leadership ==
The PBA Partylist is currently led by:

- Chairman: Jericho Nograles
- President: Mark Aeron Sambar
- Leader: Migs Nograles

== Electoral performance ==
The PBA Partylist has had fluctuating success in elections:

- 2007: Failed to win a seat.
- 2010: Won 1 seat in the 15th Congress.
- 2013: Lost representation in the 16th Congress.
- 2016: Regained representation, winning 2 seats in the 17th Congress.
- 2019 and 2022: Maintained representation in the 18th and 19th Congresses.

== Advocacy and policies ==
The PBA Partylist focuses on promoting the welfare of Filipino athletes and advancing sports development. Key initiatives include:

- Advocating for the creation of a Department of Sports to centralize sports-related policies and programs.
- Pushing for increased funding and support for national athletes.
- Promoting grassroots sports programs to nurture young talent.

== Electoral results ==
Election	Votes	%	Secured Seats	Party-List Seats	Congress	1st Representative	2nd Representative	3rd Representative
2007	72,395	0.45%	0 / 3	53	14th Congress; 2007–2010	Failed to secure representation in Congress		
2010	258,869	0.86%	1 / 3	57	15th Congress; 2010–2013	Mark Aeron Sambar	—N/a	—N/a
2013	212,298	0.77%	0 / 3	59	16th Congress; 2013–2016	Failed to secure representation in Congress		
2016	780,309	2.41%	2 / 3	59	17th Congress; 2016–2019	Mark Aeron Sambar	Jericho Nograles	—N/a
2019	326,258	1.17%	1 / 3	61	18th Congress; 2019–2022	Jericho Nograles	—N/a	—N/a
2022	294,619	0.80%	1 / 3	63	19th Congress; 2022–2025	Migs Nograles	—N/a	—N/a
2025	35,078	0.08%	0 / 3	63	20th Congress; 2025–2028	Failed to secure representation in Congress		
Note: For party-list representation in the House of Representatives of the Philippines, a party can win a maximum of three seats.

== See also ==
- Party-list representation in the House of Representatives of the Philippines
- Manny Pacquiao
- Jericho Nograles
- Migs Nograles
