= Alejandro Almendras =

Filipino politician

The Honorable Alejandro Almendras
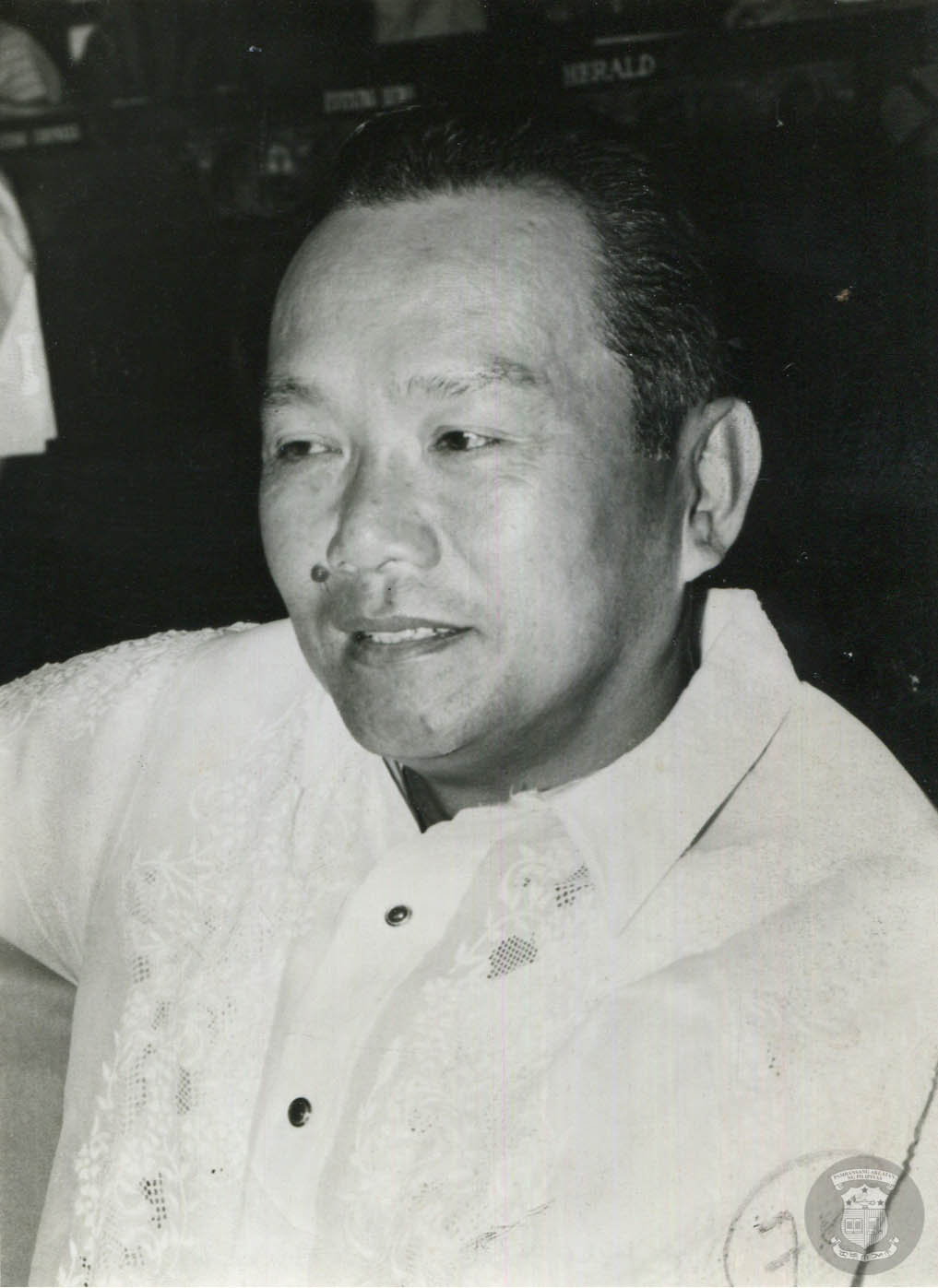

Member of the Philippine House of Representatives from Davao del Sur's 1st district
- In office June 30, 1992 – June 30, 1995
- Preceded by: Juanito Camasura Jr.
- Succeeded by: Alejandro Almendras Jr.

3rd Governor of Davao del Sur
- Officer In Charge; March 25, 1986 – February 2, 1988
- Preceded by: Nonito Llanos
- Succeeded by: Douglas Cagas

Member of the Regular Batasang Pambansa
- In office July 23, 1984 – March 25, 1986 Serving with Douglas Cagas
- Constituency: Davao del Sur

Member of the Interim Batasang Pambansa
- In office June 12, 1978 – June 5, 1984
- Constituency: Region XI

Senator of the Philippines
- In office December 30, 1959 – September 23, 1972

17th Governor of Davao
- In office 1951–1958
- Preceded by: Ricardo Miranda
- Succeeded by: Vicente Duterte

Personal details
- Born: Alejandro Durano Almendras; February 27, 1919 Danao, Cebu, Philippine Islands
- Died: August 4, 1995 (aged 76)
- Party: Lakas–NUCD (1992–1995)
- Other political affiliations: Nacionalista (1951–1978; 1987–1992); KBL (1978–1986)
- Spouse: Caridad Cabahug (m. 1945)
- Children: 7
- Education: Far Eastern University
- Occupation: Politician

Military service
- Allegiance: Philippines
- Branch/service: Philippine Commonwealth Army
- Years of service: 1941–1945
- Rank: Lieutenant colonel
- Unit: Philippine Army Air Corps (1941–1942)
- Commands: 88th Infantry Regiment (Cebu Area Command)
- Battles/wars: World War II

Alejandro "Landring" Durano Almendras Sr. (27 February 1919 – 4 August 1995) was a Filipino politician and businessman who served as Senator of the Philippines from 1959 to 1972. He also served as governor of the then-undivided Davao province from 1951 to 1958.

== Early life and education ==
Almendras was born in Danao, Cebu on February 27, 1919, to Paulo Almendras and Elisea Mercado Durano. He finished his secondary education at the Cebu Provincial High School in 1938. He took up aeronautical engineering at Far Eastern University, but his studies were interrupted in 1941 due to World War II. After the war, Almendras resumed his studies, attending Mindanao Colleges in Davao City.

== Career during World War II ==
Almendras was enlisted with the Philippine Army Air Corps during World War II. Following the surrender of the United States Army Forces in the Far East to the Japanese Imperial Army, he went back to Cebu and served under the command of Colonel James M. Cushing. At the age of 23, Almendras was named commander of the 88th Infantry Regiment of the Cebu Area Command. Years after the war, Almendras received the Outstanding Veteran Award in 1958.

== Political career ==
Almendras was a third-year law student in 1951 at Mindanao Colleges when he ran for governor of Davao against incumbent Ricardo Miranda of the Liberal Party, who was the first elected governor. Almendras became the youngest governor in the country at that time, and was re-elected in 1955. Almendras served as governor until 1958, when he was succeeded by Vicente Duterte. The Foreign Correspondents' Association of the Philippines conferred him with the Outstanding Governor award.

In the 1959 elections, Almendras was named part of the senatorial slate of the Nacionalista Party. In February 1959, Almendras was named as the Most Outstanding Cabinet Member by the Confederation of Filipino Veterans. Almendras was later appointed first secretary of the Department of General Services by President Carlos P. Garcia.

Almendras won as senator, placing eighth. He was re-elected in 1971, but his term was cut short in 1972 with the declaration of martial law by President Ferdinand Marcos. In 1978, Almendras was elected member of the Interim Batasang Pambansa, representing Southern Mindanao. He won as member of the Regular Batasang Pambansa in 1984, representing Davao del Sur alongside Douglas Cagas.

After the 1986 People Power Revolution that ousted Marcos, Almendras was appointed interim governor of Davao del Sur. In the 1987 elections, Almendras ran again for senator under the opposition Grand Alliance for Democracy but lost, placing 29th. Later that year, Almendras organized Lakas ng Dabaw, a local political alliance in Davao City that fielded OIC vice mayor Rodrigo Duterte, the son of his late ally and cousin Vicente Duterte, for mayor of Davao City. In 1992, Almendras was elected representative of Davao del Sur's 1st district. He did not seek re-election in 1995, and was succeeded by his son Alejandro Jr.

== Personal life ==
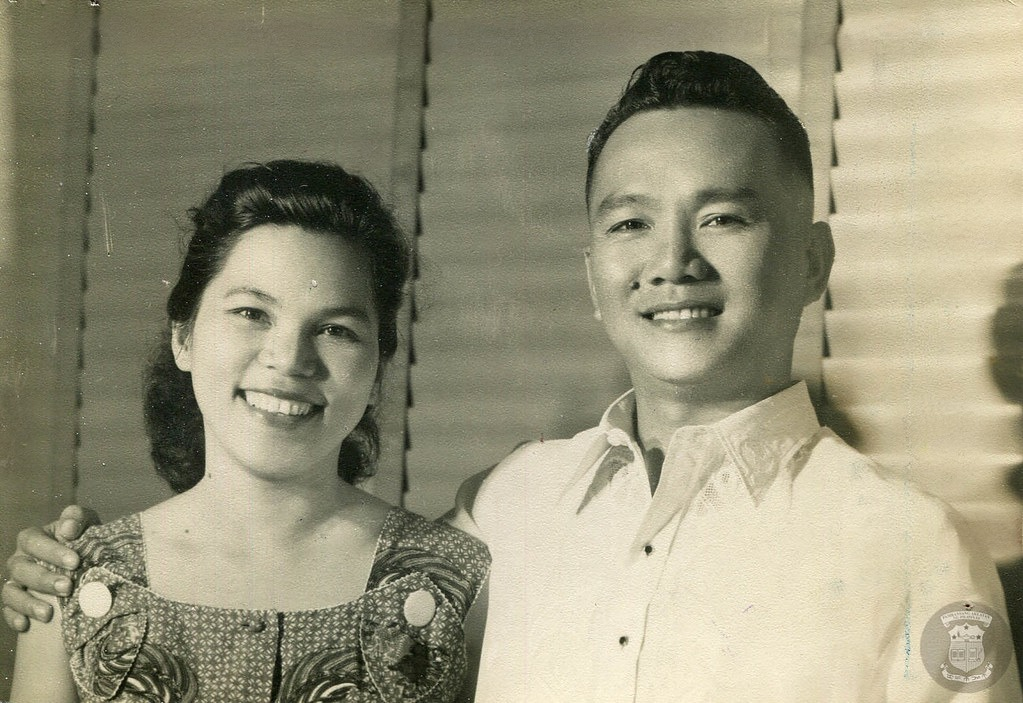
Almendras and his wife Caridad Cabahug

Almendras was married to Caridad Cabahug of Borbon, Cebu, with whom he had seven children.

== Death and legacy ==
Almendras died on August 4, 1995, due to a lingering illness. He was credited for the passing of Republic Act 3018 which nationalized the rice and corn industry and founded the Veterans Bank. House Speaker Jose de Venecia noted his role for the partition of Davao province which, according to de Venecia, brought socio-economic development in Davao Region. Due to his work and the resulting provinces, Almendras is known as the "Father of Davao".
