= Jericho Nograles =

Filipino politician (born 1981)

The Honorable Jericho Nograles
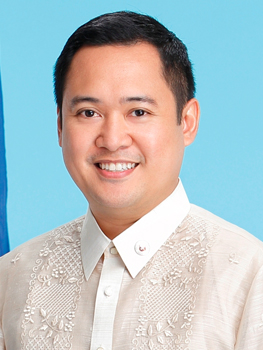
- Official portrait, 2019

President & CEO of the National Power Corporation
- Incumbent
- Assumed office September 11, 2025
- Appointed by: Bongbong Marcos

Member of the Philippine House of Representatives for PBA Partylist
- In office June 30, 2016 – June 30, 2022
- Succeeded by: Margarita Ignacia Nograles

Personal details
- Born: Jericho Jonas Bendigo Nograles; April 23, 1981 (age 45) Davao City, Philippines
- Party: PBA (partylist; 2015–2022)
- Parent(s): Prospero Nograles; Rhodora Burgos Bendigo Nograles
- Relatives: Karlo Nograles (brother); Margarita "Migs" Nograles (sister)
- Education: Ateneo de Manila University (BS); University of Western Australia (MBA); Sulu State College (DPA)

Jericho Jonas "Koko" Bendigo Nograles (born April 23, 1981) is a Filipino government official who currently serves as the President and Chief Executive Officer of the National Power Corporation since 2025, after being appointed by President Bongbong Marcos. A former congressman and represented the Puwersa ng Bayang Atleta (PBA) Partylist from 2016 to 2022 as its official spokesperson. He was the Assistant Majority Leader of the House of Representatives of the Philippines. He is one of the 70 representatives who voted to deny the franchise renewal of ABS-CBN.

== Personal life ==
Koko Nograles was born on April 23, 1981, in Davao City to Prospero Nograles, a lawyer who would later serve as Representative of Davao City's 1st district and House Speaker, and Rhodora Burgos Bendigo Nograles. He is the brother of Civil Service Commission Chairman Karlo Nograles and PBA Partylist Representative Margarita Ignacia Nograles.

== Educational background ==
Nograles earned his Bachelor's degree in Management, majoring in Legal Management from the Ateneo de Manila University (1999–2003) and completed a Master in Business Administration degree at the University of Western Australia (2008–2012). Nograles also holds a Doctorate in Public Administration from the Sulu State College.

== Political career ==
In 2016, Nograles ran for and won a seat as congressman for the Puwersa ng Bayaning Atleta (PBA) Partylist. That same year, he was designated as legislative caretaker of the 1st District of Sulu, and later in 2018, as the caretaker of 1st district of Davao City that his brother Karlo vacated upon his appointment as Cabinet Secretary. In 2019, he was re-elected as a congressman. Nograles also served as the Assistant Majority Leader of the Congress of the Philippines.

Nograles is an active member of 12 congressional committees (such as the Committees on Rules, Justice, Good Government and Public Accountability, Housing and Urban Development, National Defense and Security, Public Order and Safety, and Ways and Means). Nograles is the principal author of more than 160 House bills and resolutions and co-author of 157 more. Some of these House bills, such as the Free College Education Act, Free Irrigation Service Act, Free WiFi Access Act, Occupational Safety and Health Standards Act, 10-Year Passport Validity Act, National ID Act, National Mental Health Act, and the Electric Cooperative Emergency Fund Act, were signed into law.

In November 2018, Nograles was designated as the caretaker representative of the 1st District of Davao City.

On July 10, 2020, Nograles was one of the 70 Congressman who voted to reject the franchise renewal of ABS-CBN, in favor of a report from Technical Working Group.

From August 2024 to September 2025, Nograles served as President of the Philippine Tobacco Institute.

From March 2025 to September 2025, he served as a member of the Inter-Agency Committee on Tobacco, a multi-agency body tasked with coordinating national tobacco control and regulatory policies.

From June 2025 to September 2025, he also served as a member of the Tobacco Commodity Board.

On 11 September 2025, Nograles assumed office as President and Chief Executive Officer of the National Power Corporation after being appointed by President Ferdinand R. Marcos Jr.
