= Karlo Nograles =

Former chairman of the Civil Service Commission

The Honorable Karlo Nograles
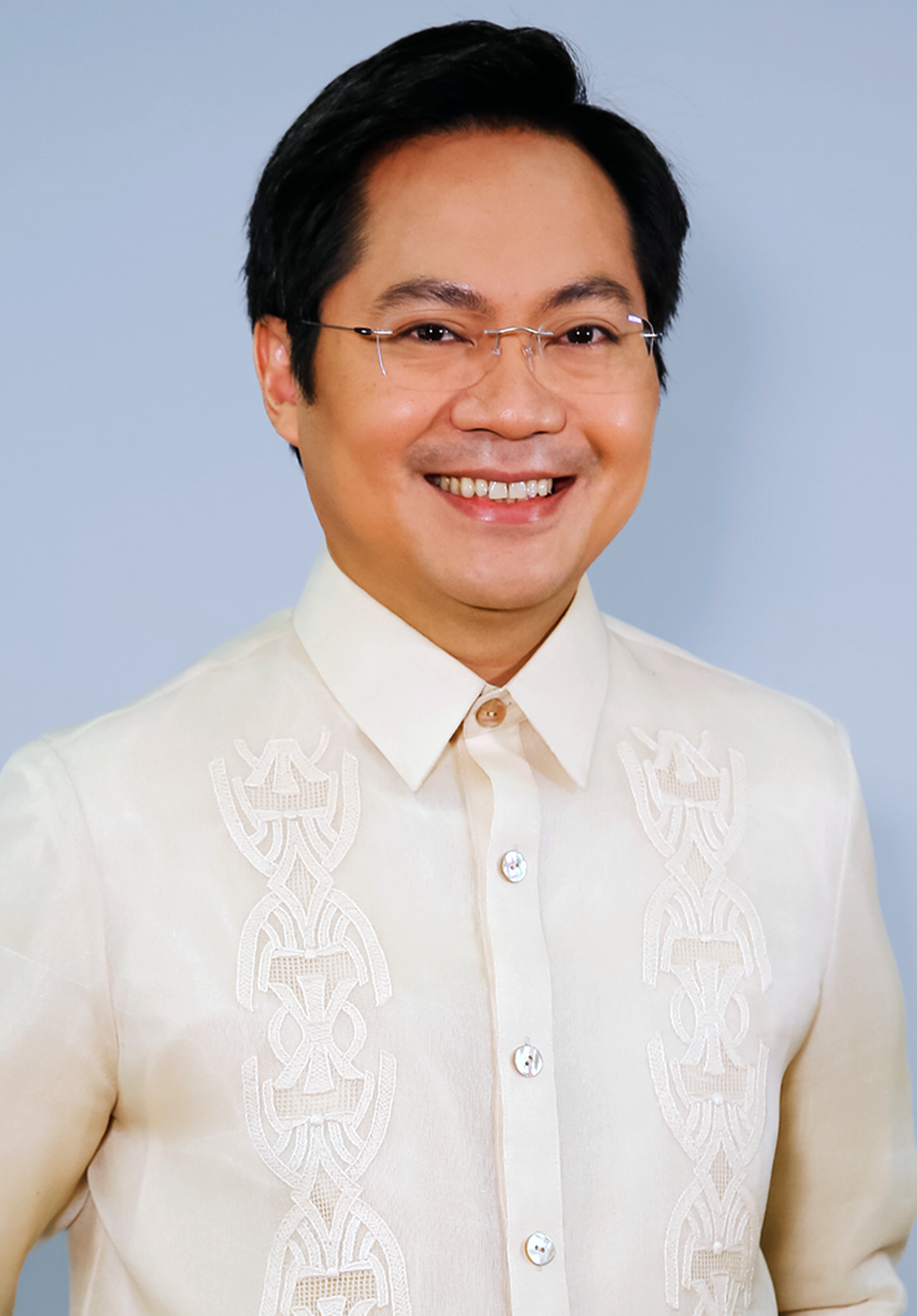
- Official portrait, 2022

Chairman of the Civil Service Commission
- In office June 30, 2022 – October 7, 2024
- President: Bongbong Marcos
- Preceded by: Aileen Lourdes Lizada (acting)
- Succeeded by: Marilyn Barua-Yap
- In office March 4, 2022 – June 1, 2022
- President: Rodrigo Duterte
- Preceded by: Alicia dela Rosa-Bala
- Succeeded by: Aileen Lourdes Lizada (acting)

Cabinet Secretary of the Philippines
- In office November 5, 2018 – March 7, 2022
- President: Rodrigo Duterte
- Preceded by: Leoncio Evasco Jr.
- Succeeded by: Melvin Matibag (acting)

Presidential Spokesperson
- Acting
- In office November 15, 2021 – March 7, 2022
- President: Rodrigo Duterte
- Preceded by: Harry Roque
- Succeeded by: Martin Andanar (acting)

IATF-EID Spokesperson
- In office November 17, 2021 – March 7, 2022
- Preceded by: Harry Roque
- Succeeded by: Martin Andanar (acting)
- In office March 16, 2020 – April 23, 2020
- Preceded by: Position created
- Succeeded by: Harry Roque

Chairman of the Inter-Agency Task Force on Zero Hunger
- In office January 11, 2020 – March 7, 2022
- President: Rodrigo Duterte
- Preceded by: Position created
- Succeeded by: Usec. Melvin Matibag (Acting)

Member of the Philippine House of Representatives from Davao City's 1st district
- In office June 30, 2010 – November 5, 2018
- Preceded by: Prospero Nograles
- Succeeded by: Paolo Duterte

Personal details
- Born: Karlo Alexei Bendigo Nograles; September 3, 1976 (age 50) Davao City, Philippines
- Party: Independent (2024–present)
- Other political affiliations: Lakas (2009–2011); NUP (2011–2017); PDP–Laban (2017–2024)
- Spouse: Marga Maceda Montemayor
- Relations: Jericho Nograles (brother); Margarita "Migs" Nograles (sister)
- Children: 3
- Parents: Prospero Nograles (father); Rhodora Nograles (mother)
- Education: Ateneo de Manila University (BS, J.D.)
- Profession: Lawyer
- Website: karlonograles.ph

Karlo Alexei Bendigo Nograles (born September 3, 1976) is a Filipino lawyer and politician who served as the Chairperson of the Civil Service Commission from March 4, 2022 to October 7, 2024. He was previously the Cabinet Secretary (2018–2022) and acting Presidential Spokesperson (2021–2022) in the Duterte administration. He was also the co-chair and spokesperson of the Inter-Agency Task Force for the Management of Emerging Infectious Diseases (IATF-EID) in the Philippine government's response to the COVID-19 pandemic and chairman of the government's Inter-Agency Task Force on Zero Hunger. He was the representative of Davao City's 1st district from 2010 to 2018.

In the 2016 Philippine presidential elections, Nograles was among those who encouraged then-Davao City Mayor Rodrigo Duterte to run for president. He was a member of the National Unity Party (NUP) before joining PDP–Laban in 2017.

== Early life and education ==
Karlo Alexei Bendigo Nograles was born on September 3, 1976, in Davao City to Prospero Nograles, a lawyer who would later become Speaker of the House of Representatives, and Rhodora Burgos Bendigo Nograles. He has three siblings.

Nograles attended grade school in Ateneo de Davao University from 1983 to 1989, where he graduated valedictorian of his class. In high school, he was admitted to the Philippine Science High School Main Campus, graduating in 1993 and receiving a C.A.T. Leadership Award. He proceeded to the Ateneo de Manila University for college, graduating in 1997 with a Bachelor of Science in Management Engineering degree. He finished his Juris Doctor degree in 2003 at the Ateneo de Manila Law School.

== Political career ==
=== Congress ===
Official portrait of Nograles in the 16th Congress

Nograles' career in politics began when he served as the Chief-of-Staff of his father who was then serving as a member of the House of Representatives. In 2010, he was elected as the representative of the 1st district of Davao City. He ran again in the 2013 elections and successfully won another term. In his second term as representative, he served as the Chairman of the House Committee on Labor and Employment.

He served his third and final term in the 17th Congress, having run unopposed during the 2016 elections. During this time, he served as the Chairman of the House Committee on Appropriations. As chairman, Nograles was notable for allocating the budget for free higher education in accordance with the Universal Access to Quality Tertiary Education Act. In 2017, he allotted a total of ₱40 billion to fund free education for students enrolled in state universities and colleges (SUCs) for the school year 2018–2019. Before 2017 ended, he appropriated ₱3.767 trillion for the 2018 national budget. Initially ridden with conflicting proposals with the Senate's version of the bill and budget cuts, the 'impasse' plaguing the proposed budget was resolved after a Bicameral Conference Committee meeting.

In 2018, also as appropriations chair, he allocated a ₱25-billion budget for the Armed Forces of the Philippines (AFP) modernization program. This initiative covered the acquisition of brand new attack helicopters, tanks, and other military hardware. He also allotted funds amounting to ₱64.2 billion for the salary increase of military and uniformed personnel.

In accordance with his Free Irrigation Law which was signed in February 2018, he allocated ₱2.6 billion for irrigation fee subsidies for 2018, which was higher than the ₱2 billion irrigation budget for 2017.

==== Committee membership ====
While Nograles is known as the Chairman of the House Committee on Appropriations, he was also part of the following committees:

Member of the Philippine House of Representatives from Davao City's First District
15th Congress	Vice-chairman, Committee on Human Rights
15th Congress	Member, Committee on Dangerous Drugs
15th Congress	Member, Committee on Good Government and Public Accountability
15th Congress	Member, Committee on Government Reorganization
15th Congress	Member, Committee on Health
15th Congress	Member, Committee on Public Order and Safety
15th Congress	Member, Committee on Revision of Laws
15th Congress	Member, Committee on Rules
15th Congress	Member, Committee on Suffrage and Electoral Reforms
15th Congress	Member, Committee on Transportation
16th Congress	Chairman, Committee on Labor and Employment
16th Congress	Vice-chairman, Committee on Human Rights
16th Congress	Vice-chairman, Committee on Revision of Laws
16th Congress	Member, Committee on Constitutional Amendments
16th Congress	Member, Committee on Energy
16th Congress	Member, Committee on Higher and Technical Education
16th Congress	Member, Committee on Housing and Urban Development
16th Congress	Member, Committee on Transportation
16th Congress	Member, Committee on Ways and Means
16th Congress	Member, Committee on Dangerous Drugs
17th Congress	Chairman, Committee on Appropriations
17th Congress	Member, Committee on Constitutional Amendments
17th Congress	Member, Committee on Mindanao Affairs

=== Executive branch ===
Nograles served as Cabinet Secretary in the administration of President Rodrigo Duterte from 2018 to 2022. He also became acting Presidential spokesperson from 2021 to 2022. In 2022, he became chair of the Civil Service Commission, serving in the position until his resignation on October 7, 2024.

=== 2025 Davao City mayoralty bid ===
On October 8, 2024, he filed his candidacy to run for mayor of Davao City in the 2025 Philippine general election, but lost to Rodrigo Duterte.

== Personal life ==
Nograles is married to Marga Maceda Montemayor, a social entrepreneur and an advocate for women and Mindanao. They have three children.

He is a member of the Aquila Legis fraternity and of the Global Organization of Parliamentarians Against Corruption. He also has links to Junior Chamber International.

He is the recipient of the Golden Globe Annual Award for Excellence in Public Service in 2015 and 2016. He was also awarded the Outstanding Congressman Award in 2012 and again in 2015 by Superbrands Marketing International. Nograles also took part as chairman of the Board of Jurors tasked to judge the awardees of the 2017 Metro Manila Film Festival.

House of Representatives of the Philippines
Preceded by Prospero Nograles	Member of the Philippine House of Representatives from Davao City's 1st District; 2010–2018	Vacant Title next held by Paolo Duterte
Political offices
Preceded by Leoncio Evasco Jr.	Cabinet Secretary of the Philippines; 2018–2022	Succeeded by Melvin Matibag; Acting
New title	Chairman of the Inter-Agency Task Force on Zero Hunger; 2020–2022	Vacant
New title	IATF-EID Spokesperson; 2020	Succeeded by Harry Roque
Preceded by Harry Roque	IATF-EID Spokesperson; 2021–2022	Succeeded by Martin Andanar; Acting
Preceded by Harry Roque	Presidential Spokesperson; Acting; 2021–2022	Succeeded by Martin Andanar; Acting
Preceded by Alicia dela Rosa-Bala	Chairperson of the Civil Service Commission; 2022	Succeeded by Aileen Lourdes Lizada; Acting
Preceded by Aileen Lourdes Lizada; Acting	Chairperson of the Civil Service Commission; 2022–2024	Succeeded by Marilyn Barua-Yap
