= Migs Nograles =

Filipino lawyer and politician (born 1990)

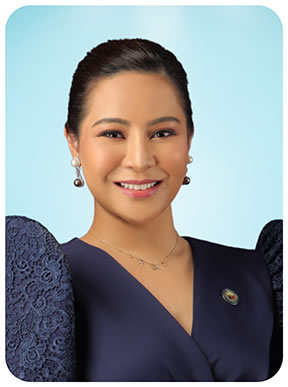
- Official portrait, 2022

Member of the Philippine House of Representatives from PBA Partylist
- In office June 30, 2022 – June 30, 2025
- Preceded by: Jericho Nograles

Personal details
- Born: Margarita Ignacia Bendigo Nograles; September 29, 1990 (age 36) Makati, Philippines
- Party: Independent (2024–present)
- Other political affiliations: PBA (partylist; 2021–2025)
- Spouse: Cheeno Almario (m. 2024)
- Relations: Karlo Nograles (brother); Jericho Nograles (brother)
- Children: 1
- Parent: Prospero Nograles (father)
- Education: Fordham University; Far Eastern University – De La Salle University (JD, MBA); Harvard Kennedy School
- Profession: Lawyer, politician, professor
- Website: Official website

Margarita Ignacia "Migs" Bendigo Nograles-Almario (born September 29, 1990) is a Filipino lawyer and politician who served as the first nominee of the Puwersa ng Bayaning Atleta (PBA) party-list in the House of Representatives of the Philippines from 2022 to 2025. Known for her advocacy for athletes and sports development, Nograles is involved in political campaigns, her legal career, and legislative work.

== Early life and education ==
Nograles was born in Makati and raised in Davao City, Philippines. She comes from a prominent political family. Her father, Prospero Nograles, served as Speaker of the House of Representatives from 2008 to 2010. Her brothers, Jericho Nograles and Karlo Nograles, are both former congressmen, with Karlo served as the chairman of the Civil Service Commission from 2022 to 2024. Her sister, Kristine Nograles-Hugo, is also a well-known figure in the Philippines.

Nograles began her college education at Ateneo de Manila University, where she pursued a degree in AB Management Economics but did not complete the program. She later transferred to Fordham University in New York, USA, where she earned a Bachelor of Arts in Economics and Political Science.

She then pursued her legal education through the Juris Doctor-Master of Business Administration (MBA) Joint Consortium Program offered by Far Eastern University and De La Salle University, graduating as valedictorian with a gold medal for Academic Excellence. Additionally, she completed a special course in Arbitration from the Harvard Kennedy School. Nograles passed the Philippine Bar Examination in 2019.

== Career ==
=== Legal career ===
Before entering politics, Nograles built a distinguished legal career. She worked as a lawyer at Villaraza & Angangco Law, a prominent law firm in the Philippines. She later became the Managing Partner of Nograles Ilagan Sagarino Selgas Cayco Aban & Dabi (NISSCAD) Law, a firm she co-founded in Davao City. She also served as a Law Professor, sharing her expertise with aspiring lawyers.

=== Political career ===
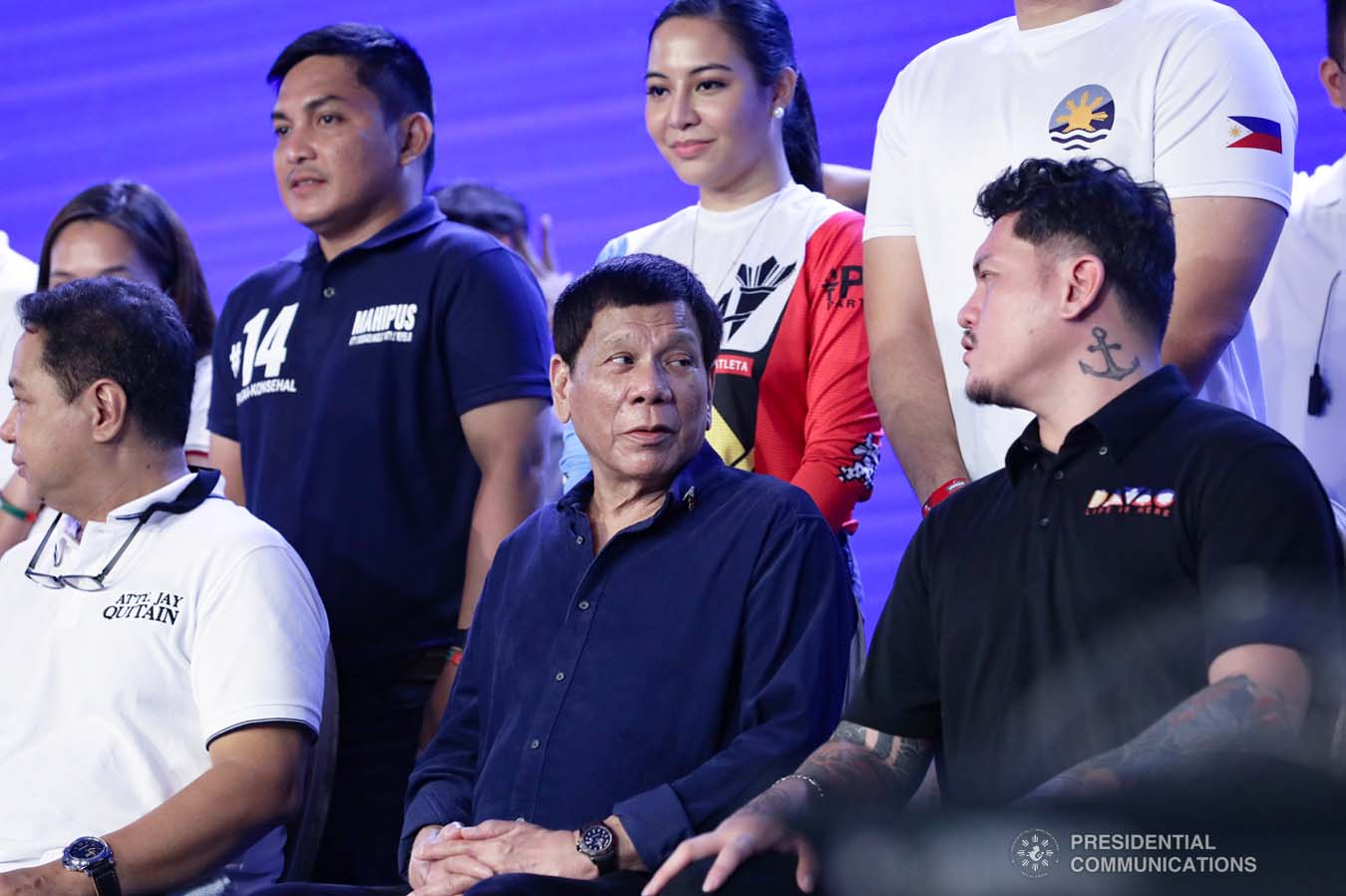
Nograles (center to the first row) during the final Hugpong ng Pagbabago–Hugpong sa Tawong Lungsod political rally before the 2022 election

In 2022, Nograles was elected as the first nominee of the Puwersa ng Bayaning Atleta (PBA) party-list in the 19th Congress of the Philippines. She was subsequently appointed as Deputy Speaker of the House of Representatives. As a congresswoman, she focused on advocating for the welfare of athletes and promoting sports development in the country.

Nograles has also been involved in legislative work, authoring and co-authoring several bills and resolutions. One of her notable contributions is House Bill No. 00451, titled "An Act Encouraging Corporate Social Responsibility, Providing Incentives Therefor", which aims to promote sustainable and socially responsible business practices.

Nograles ran again for congresswoman, this time representing Davao City's 1st congressional district in 2025. She lost to the incumbent, Paolo Duterte.

== Political campaigns ==
On October 8, 2024, Nograles filed her Certificate of Candidacy (COC) for the First Congressional District of Davao City, running as an independent candidate. She challenged Paolo "Pulong" Duterte, the incumbent representative and son of former President Rodrigo Duterte. Her decision to run against Duterte drew significant attention, particularly in light of her public dare for him to undergo a hair follicle drug test, a challenge she issued in response to a similar call made by Vice President Sara Duterte for all candidates in the 2025 elections.

Nograles has also been involved in a public dispute with Duterte over the alleged suspension of medical and burial assistance provisions in Davao City. Duterte accused the Department of Social Welfare and Development (DSWD) of failing to release funds, while Nograles countered that the DSWD has sufficient funds and that the notice of suspension was misinformation.

== Personal life ==
On October 30, 2024, Nograles married Cheeno Almario, a congressman from Davao Oriental's 2nd district, with whom she has one daughter.

== Electoral history ==
Electoral history of Migs Nograles
Year	Office	Party	Votes received				Result
Year	Office	Party	Total	%	P.	Swing	Result
2022	Representative (Party-list)	PBA	294,619	0.80%	41st	—N/a	Won
2025	Representative (Davao City–1st)	Independent	49,186	19.03%	2nd	—N/a	Lost
