= Marc Douglas Cagas IV =

Filipino politician (born 1976)

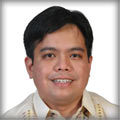
- Official portrait, 2010

Vice Governor of Davao del Sur
- Incumbent
- Assumed office June 30, 2025
- Governor: Yvonne Roña Cagas
- Preceded by: Riafe Cagas-Fernandez
- In office June 30, 2019 – June 10, 2021
- Governor: Douglas Cagas
- Preceded by: Aileen Almendras
- Succeeded by: John Tracy Cagas

9th Governor of Davao del Sur
- In office June 10, 2021 – June 30, 2022
- Vice Governor: John Tracy Cagas
- Preceded by: Douglas Cagas
- Succeeded by: Yvonne Roña Cagas

Member of the Philippine House of Representatives from Davao del Sur's 1st congressional district
- In office June 30, 2007 – June 30, 2013
- Preceded by: Douglas Cagas
- Succeeded by: Mercedes C. Cagas

Personal details
- Born: Marc Douglas Chan Cagas IV; April 24, 1976 (age 50) Cebu City, Cebu, Philippines
- Party: Nacionalista (2007–2013; 2019–present)
- Other political affiliations: NPC (2013–2019)
- Spouse: Yvonne Roña Cagas
- Relations: John Tracy Cagas (cousin)
- Children: 3
- Parents: Douglas Cagas (father); Mercedes C. Cagas (mother)

Marc Douglas Chan Cagas IV (born April 24, 1976) is a Filipino politician. A member of the Nacionalista Party, he was elected in 2007 as a Member of the House of Representatives of the Philippines, representing the First District of Davao del Sur. He forfeited a run for re-election in 2013 in order to run for Governor of Davao del Sur. Cagas lost the election to the Liberal Party candidate, former Congressman Claude Bautista. In 2021, upon the death of his father he became governor of the province. He attended at the University of the East, College of Law from 1999 to 2004.

Cagas was charged with graft after being found to have channeled his pork barrel funds to non-government organizations (NGOs) controlled by suspected pork barrel scam mastermind Janet Lim-Napoles between 2007 and 2009. In 2022, he entered into a plea bargain agreement that saw him admit to lesser offenses of two counts of fraud against public treasury and two counts of failure of an accountable officer to render accounts. As a result, he was sentenced to pay fines of P32,000.

On June 10, 2021, his father, Douglas Cagas, died due to complications of COVID-19. In the Philippines' order of succession, the vice governor takes over the office of the governor. Hence, he and his cousin, John Tracy, a board member, took over the offices of governor and vice-governor, respectively.

Cagas is married to Yvonne Roña, who also became governor of Davao del Sur in 2022.

Assembly seats
| Preceded by Douglas Cagas | Representative, 1st District of Davao del Sur; 2007–2013 | Succeeded by Mercedes Cagas |
Political offices
| Preceded by Aileen Almendras | Vice Governor of Davao del Sur; 2019–2021 | Succeeded by John Tracy Cagas |
| Preceded by Douglas Cagas | Governor of Davao del Sur; 2021–present | Incumbent |
