= Prospero Nograles =

Speaker of the House of Representatives of the Philippines from 2008 to 2010

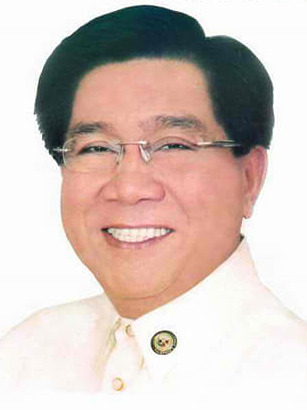
- Nograles in 2004

22nd Speaker of the House of Representatives of the Philippines
- In office February 5, 2008 – June 30, 2010
- Preceded by: Jose de Venecia
- Succeeded by: Feliciano Belmonte Jr.

Member of the Philippine House of Representatives from Davao City's 1st congressional district
- In office June 30, 2001 – June 30, 2010
- Preceded by: Rodrigo Duterte
- Succeeded by: Karlo Nograles
- In office June 30, 1995 – June 30, 1998
- Preceded by: Jesus Dureza
- Succeeded by: Rodrigo Duterte
- In office June 16, 1989 – June 30, 1992
- Preceded by: Jesus Dureza
- Succeeded by: Jesus Dureza

Personal details
- Born: Prospero Rafael Castillo Nograles; October 30, 1947 Davao City, Philippines
- Died: May 4, 2019 (aged 71) Davao City, Philippines
- Party: NUP (2011–2019)
- Other political affiliations: Lakas (2001–2011); Independent (1995–1998); LDP (1988–1995); Lakas ng Bansa (1987–1988); UNIDO (1984–1987)
- Spouse: Rhodora Bendigo (m. 1973)
- Children: Karlo; Jericho; Margarita; Kristine Elizabeth
- Education: Ateneo de Manila University (BA, LL.B)
- Occupation: Politician
- Profession: Lawyer

Prospero Rafael Castillo Nograles (October 30, 1947 – May 4, 2019, pronounced [nɔˈɡrɐlɛs]) also known as "Boy" or "Nogie", was a Filipino lawyer and politician who served as the speaker of the House of Representatives from 2008 to 2010. He was the first speaker from Mindanao in a hundred years of Philippine legislative history. From 1989 to 2010, he served as the representative for Davao City's 1st district.

== Biography ==
=== Early life and education ===
Nograles was born on October 30, 1947 in Davao City. He finished his elementary and secondary education at the Ateneo de Davao University. He then studied at the Ateneo de Manila University, obtaining his Bachelor of Arts degree in political science in 1967. He earned his Bachelor of Laws degree from the Ateneo de Manila Law School in 1971 and placed second in the bar examinations of the same year with an average score of 90.95 percent.

=== Early political career ===
Nograles was active in the political opposition against President Ferdinand Marcos. He was involved in the litigation of human rights cases during that period, and he actively campaigned for Corazon Aquino in the 1986 snap presidential election.

After Aquino's assumption to power, Nograles sought a seat in the House of Representatives in 1987 for the first district of Davao City but initially lost to Jesus Dureza. Nograles was eventually seated into Congress in 1989 following a favorable decision by the House Electoral Tribunal.

In 1992, Nograles gave up his congressional seat to mount a bid for mayor of Davao City. He was defeated by then-reelectionist Mayor Rodrigo Duterte with a landslide margin of 98,000 votes. After his second unconsecutive term in Congress, Nograles launched another bid for mayor of Davao in 1998 but narrowly lost to Duterte-backed Vice Mayor Benjamin de Guzman by 23,000 votes. Nograles and de Guzman would later become political allies against Duterte.

Nograles returned to his congressional seat in 2001 and was re-elected unopposed for two more terms in 2004 and 2007. During his stay in Congress, Nograles chaired the Special Committee on Law Enforcement and its subcommittee on Gambling, Committee on Housing and Urban Development, and the Committee on Rules. He authored 17 bills and co-authored 85 bills.

=== Speaker of the House ===
In 2008, several members of Congress dissatisfied with the leadership of House Speaker Jose de Venecia expressed support for Nograles to replace de Venecia as speaker. On February 5, 2008, majority of House members approved a motion to declare House speakership vacant. Shortly thereafter, de Venecia nominated Nograles as his replacement. No objections were posed to Nograles' unopposed election.

=== 2010 mayoralty bid and reconciliation with Rodrigo Duterte ===
Nograles ran again for mayor of Davao City in 2010, this time to Vice Mayor Sara Duterte, daughter of his long-time political nemesis, then-mayor and future president Rodrigo Duterte who ran for vice mayor. Nograles lost to the younger Duterte by a margin of 200,000 votes while his running mate, former mayor Benjamin de Guzman, lost to the elder Duterte by a wider margin of 300,000 votes.

After thirty years of political rivalry, Nograles and Duterte eventually reconciled on November 27, 2015 when Nograles supported Duterte's 2016 presidential bid.

=== Post-Congress ===
In September 2016, reports surfaced that Nograles' bodyguards were killed by the Davao Death Squad (DDS) when he ran for mayor against Sara Duterte in 2010. Edgar Matobato, a self-confessed DDS member, claimed that the group had kidnapped and killed four supporters of Nograles in Samal, Davao del Norte upon the orders of then-Mayor Rodrigo Duterte. Nograles denied the claim.

On March 7, 2017, the Ombudsman filed graft and malversation charges against Nograles for alleged misuse of pork barrel funds for "ghost projects" when he was caretaker congressman for Misamis Oriental. The investigation showed that the Department of Budget and Management had released ₱47 million of Priority Development Assistance Fund (PDAF) for "bogus" projects and foundations.

=== Death ===
Nograles died of respiratory failure on May 4, 2019. He was 71. President Duterte attended his wake and expressed his condolences to the Nograles family. He was interred at the Forest Lake Memorial Park in Davao City.

House of Representatives of the Philippines
Preceded by Jesus Dureza; Jesus Dureza; Rodrigo Duterte	Member of the House of Representatives, Davao City's 1st district 1989–1992; 1995–1998; 2001–2010	Succeeded by Jesus Dureza; Rodrigo Duterte; Karlo Nograles
Preceded by Jose de Venecia	Speaker of the House of Representatives of the Philippines; 2008–2010	Succeeded by Feliciano Belmonte Jr.
Party political offices
Preceded by Jose de Venecia	Chair of Lakas-CMD; 2008–2009	Position abolished Parties merged into Lakas-Kampi-CMD
Position established	Vice Chairman of Lakas-Kampi-CMD; 2009–2010; Served alongside: Ronaldo Puno	Succeeded by Edu Manzano
