= Douglas Cagas =

Philippine politician (1943–2021)

The Honourable Douglas Cagas
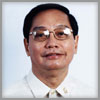
- Official portrait, 2004

4th Governor of Davao del Sur
- In office June 30, 2016 – June 10, 2021
- Vice Governor: Aileen Almendras (2016–2019); Marc Douglas Cagas IV (2019–2021)
- Preceded by: Claude Bautista
- Succeeded by: Marc Douglas Cagas IV
- In office June 30, 2007 – June 30, 2013
- Vice Governor: Simplicio Latasa (2007–2010); Arsenio Latasa (2010–2013)
- Preceded by: Benjamin Bautista Jr.
- Succeeded by: Claude Bautista
- In office February 2, 1988 – June 30, 1992
- Preceded by: Alejandro Almendras
- Succeeded by: Rogelio Llanos

Member of the House of Representatives from Davao del Sur's 1st district
- In office June 30, 1998 – June 30, 2007
- Preceded by: Alejandro Almendras Jr.
- Succeeded by: Marc Douglas Cagas IV

Member of the Regular Batasang Pambansa
- In office June 30, 1984 – March 25, 1986 Serving with Alejandro Almendras
- Constituency: Davao del Sur

Personal details
- Born: December 3, 1943 Second Philippine Republic
- Died: June 10, 2021 (aged 77) Digos, Davao del Sur, Philippines
- Party: Independent (2018–2021)
- Other political affiliations: Nacionalista (2009–2018); Lakas (2007–2009); NPC (2001–2007); LAMMP (1998–2001); PDP–Laban (1984–1986)
- Spouse: Mercedes Chan Cagas
- Children: Marc Douglas Cagas IV

Douglas "Dodo" Ralota Cagas (December 3, 1943 – June 10, 2021) was a Filipino politician and a representative of the first district of the Philippine province of Davao del Sur. He later served as governor of Davao del Sur from 2007 to 2013 and again from 2016 until his death.

== Biography ==
A member of the well-known Cagas clan, Cagas was an important and controversial personality within the Mindanao political movement. He began his political career in the early 1980s as a member of the Regular National Assembly of his province, and then became a member of the House of Representatives between 1998 and 2007. At the end of his term as representative, he was elected governor of Davao del Sur, a position he held until 2013 and again from 2016 until his death. Accused of being the instigator of the murder of journalist Nestor Bedolido in Digos in 2010, four years later, Cagas surrendered to law enforcement after an arrest warrant was issued against him. Released from prison in 2016, he was then accused by Senator Leila de Lima, along with her son and Arrel Olaño, of having appropriated approximately 9.3 million pesos through the pork barrel system during his mandate as representative.

== Personal life and death ==
Cagas was married to Chinese-Filipino Mercedes Chan Cagas, with whom he had a son, Marc. Both in turn entered politics.

Cagas died from complications of COVID-19 on June 10, 2021, at the Digos Medical Center, where he had been hospitalized for three weeks. He was succeeded as Governor by his son Marc.
