= 1970 Philippine Constitutional Convention election =

A constitutional convention was called to change the 1935 Constitution of the Philippines, written to establish the Commonwealth of the Philippines. A special election was held on November 10, 1970 to elect the convention's delegates, which would convene in 1971.

Former Philippine President Carlos P. Garcia was sworn in as the President of the Constitutional Convention on June 1, 1971. However, he died thirteen days after taking oath. Former President Diosdado Macapagal replaced Garcia. Sotero H. Laurel served as the President Pro-Tempore of the convention.

Other prominent delegates were former Senators Raul Manglapus and Roseller T. Lim. Other delegates would become influential political figures, including Hilario Davide Jr., Marcelo Fernan, Sotero Laurel, Aquilino Pimentel, Jr., Teofisto Guingona, Jr., Raul Roco, Edgardo Angara, Richard Gordon, Margarito Teves and Federico Dela Plana.

The work of the Convention was affected by the declaration of martial law in September 1972 by President Ferdinand Marcos. Eventually, on November 29, 1972, the Convention approved the new constitution. It was submitted to a vote in the 1973 constitutional plebiscite. The results of the plebiscite and the legality of the 1973 Constitution was questioned before the Philippine Supreme Court in the Ratification Cases. The constitution was upheld. Marcos' dictatorship would continue to rule until being ousted by the People Power Revolution in 1986.

== Election ==
Party	Votes	%	Seats
Nonpartisan	6,682,905	100.00	320
Total	6,682,905	100.00	320
Total votes	6,682,905	–	
Registered voters/turnout	9,811,431	68.11	

== Delegates ==
Province/City	District	Delegates
Abra	Lone	Arturo Barbero
Abra	Lone	Loreto Seares
Agusan del Norte	Lone	Edelmiro Amante
Agusan del Norte	Lone	Antonio Tupaz
Agusan del Sur	Lone	Vicente Guzman
Agusan del Sur	Lone	Lamberto Mordeno
Aklan	Lone	Augusto Legaspi
Aklan	Lone	Godofredo Ramos
Albay	1st	Jose Madrilejos Jr.
Albay	1st	Salvador Balane
Albay	2nd	Domingo Imperial Jr.
Albay	2nd	Julian Locsin
Albay	3rd	Elfren Sarte
Albay	3rd	Teresita Flores
Antique	Lone	Angel Salazar Jr.
Antique	Lone	Arturo Pacificador
Bataan	Lone	Jose Nuguid
Bataan	Lone	Armando Abad Sr.
Batanes	Lone	Geronimo Cabal
Batanes	Lone	Custodio Villalva
Batangas	1st	Felixberto Serrano
Batangas	1st	Antonio de las Alas
Batangas	2nd	Honesto Mendoza
Batangas	2nd	Jose Leviste Jr.
Batangas	2nd	Antonio Alano
Batangas	3rd	Sotero Laurel
Batangas	3rd	Artemio Lobrin
Batangas	3rd	Oscar Leviste
Benguet	Lone	Floro Bugnosen
Benguet	Lone	Fernando Bautista
Bohol	1st	Natalio Castillo Jr.
Bohol	1st	Victor de la Serna
Bohol	2nd	Teogenes Borja
Bohol	2nd	Jose Zafra
Bohol	3rd	Carlos P. Garcia
Bohol	3rd	Simplicio Apalisok
Bukidnon	Lone	Dante Sarraga
Bukidnon	Lone	Moro Lorenzo
Bukidnon	Lone	Alfredo Lagamon
Bulacan	1st	Pablo Trillana III
Bulacan	1st	Dakila Castro
Bulacan	1st	Mateo Caparas
Bulacan	2nd	Manuel Cruz
Bulacan	2nd	Justino Hermoso
Bulacan	2nd	Cesar Serapio
Bulacan	2nd	Magtanggol C. Gunigundo
Cagayan	1st	Manuel Molina
Cagayan	1st	Jose Antonio
Cagayan	1st	Pedro Laggui
Cagayan	2nd	Leoncio Puzon
Cagayan	2nd	Oscar Lazo
Camarines Norte	Lone	Rogelio Panotes
Camarines Norte	Lone	Fernando Vinzons
Camarines Sur	1st	Raul Roco
Camarines Sur	1st	Ramon Diaz
Camarines Sur	1st	Antonio Sison
Camarines Sur	2nd	Edmundo B. Cea
Camarines Sur	2nd	Domingo Guevarra
Camarines Sur	2nd	Eddie Alanis
Camarines Sur	2nd	Felix Alfelor Jr.
Camarines Sur	2nd	Lilia de Lima
Camiguin	Lone	Pedro Romualdo
Camiguin	Lone	Antonio Borromeo
Capiz	1st	Enrique Belo
Capiz	1st	George Viterbo
Capiz	2nd	Dandy Tupaz
Capiz	2nd	Pedro Exmundo
Catanduanes	Lone	Clemente Abundo
Catanduanes	Lone	Rafael Santelices
Cavite	Lone	Juanito Remulla Sr.
Cavite	Lone	Abraham Sarmiento
Cavite	Lone	Jose Santillan
Cavite	Lone	Alberto Jamir
Cebu	1st	Lydia Rodriguez
Cebu	1st	Casimiro Madarang Jr.
Cebu	2nd	Pedro Yap
Cebu	2nd	Marcelo Fernan
Cebu	2nd	Natalio Bacalso
Cebu	2nd	Jesus Garcia
Cebu	3rd	Napoleon Rama
Cebu	3rd	Antonio Bacaltos
Cebu	4th	Oliveros Kintanar
Cebu	4th	Hilario Davide Jr.
Cebu	5th	Jorge Kintanar
Cebu	5th	Pedro Calderon
Cebu	6th	Andres Flores
Cebu	6th	Francis Zosa
Cebu	7th	Antonio de Pio
Cebu	7th	Gerardo Pepito
Cotabato	Lone	Midpantao Adil
Cotabato	Lone	Antonio Velasco
Cotabato	Lone	Sandiale Sambolawan
Cotabato	Lone	Duma Sinsuat
Cotabato	Lone	Linda Ampatuan
Cotabato	Lone	Anacleto Badoy Jr.
Cotabato	Lone	Macario Camello
Cotabato	Lone	Michael Mastura
Cotabato	Lone	Sergio Tocao
Cotabato	Lone	Jose Estaniel
Davao del Norte	Lone	Gaudioso Buen
Davao del Norte	Lone	Camilo Sabio
Davao del Norte	Lone	Ramon Tirol
Davao del Norte	Lone	Lauro Arabejo
Davao del Sur	Lone	Ismael Veloso
Davao del Sur	Lone	Leon Garcia Jr.
Davao del Sur	Lone	Pedro Castillo
Davao del Sur	Lone	Dominador Carillo
Davao del Sur	Lone	Samuel Occeña
Davao del Sur	Lone	Jesus Matas
Davao Oriental	Lone	Adolfo Angala
Davao Oriental	Lone	Antonio Olmedo
Eastern Samar	Lone	Generoso Juaban
Eastern Samar	Lone	Jaime Opinion
Ifugao	Lone	Gaspar Ponchinlan
Ifugao	Lone	Raymundo Baguilat
Ilocos Norte	1st	Antonio Raquiza
Ilocos Norte	1st	Federico Ablan Sr.
Ilocos Norte	2nd	Gregorio Paruganan
Ilocos Norte	2nd	Emerito Salva
Ilocos Sur	1st	Ramon Encarnacion
Ilocos Sur	1st	Melchor Padua Jr.
Ilocos Sur	2nd	Godofredo Reyes
Ilocos Sur	2nd	Eduardo Guirnalda
Iloilo	1st	Salvador Britanico
Iloilo	1st	Lourdes Trono
Iloilo	2nd	Emilio de la Cruz II
Iloilo	2nd	Oscar Ledesma
Iloilo	3rd	Manuel Locsin
Iloilo	3rd	Amanio Sorongon
Iloilo	4th	Ramon Gonzales
Iloilo	4th	Licurgo Tirador
Iloilo	5th	Sonia Aldeguer
Iloilo	5th	Juan Borra
Isabela	Lone	Benjamin Reyes
Isabela	Lone	Heherson Alvarez
Isabela	Lone	Francisco Albano Jr.
Isabela	Lone	Celso Gangan
Isabela	Lone	Leocadio Ignacio
Kalinga-Apayao	Lone	Infante Calaycay
Kalinga-Apayao	Lone	Eubulo Verzola
La Union	1st	Victor Ortega
La Union	1st	Pedro Valdez
La Union	2nd	Antonio de Guzman
La Union	2nd	Agaton Yaranon Jr.
Laguna	1st	Jose Yulo Jr.
Laguna	1st	Manuel Concordia
Laguna	1st	Amado Garcia
Laguna	1st	Vicente Hocson
Laguna	2nd	Estanislao Fernandez
Laguna	2nd	Rustico de los Reyes Jr.
Lanao del Norte	Lone	Francisco Abalos
Lanao del Norte	Lone	Mariano Badelles
Lanao del Norte	Lone	Luis Quibranza
Lanao del Sur	Lone	Domocao Alonto
Lanao del Sur	Lone	Mangontawar Guro
Lanao del Sur	Lone	Lininding Pangandaman
Lanao del Sur	Lone	Tocod Macaraya
Lanao del Sur	Lone	Oga Mapupuno
Lanao del Sur	Lone	Pangalian Balindong
Leyte	1st	Cirilo Roy Montejo
Leyte	1st	Eduardo Quintero
Leyte	2nd	Damian Aldaba
Leyte	2nd	Francisco Astilla Sr.
Leyte	3rd	Ramon Salazar
Leyte	3rd	Antero Bongbong
Leyte	4th	Domingo Veloso
Leyte	4th	Flor Larrazabal-Sagadal
Manila	1st	Reynaldo Fajardo
Manila	1st	Salvador Mariño
Manila	1st	Fidel Santiago
Manila	2nd	Roberto Oca
Manila	2nd	Juan David
Manila	3rd	Gerardo Espina Sr.
Manila	3rd	Eduardo Sison
Manila	3rd	Feliciano Jover Ledesma
Manila	4th	Carlos Valdes
Manila	4th	Jose Marcelo
Manila	4th	Antonio Araneta Jr.
Marinduque	Lone	Carmencita Reyes
Marinduque	Lone	Ricardo Nepomuceno Jr.
Masbate	Lone	Andres Clemente Jr.
Masbate	Lone	Raul Estrella
Masbate	Lone	Mateo Esparrago Jr.
Masbate	Lone	Venancio Yaneza
Misamis Occidental	Lone	Timoteo Ruben
Misamis Occidental	Lone	Julio Ozamiz
Misamis Occidental	Lone	Elizabeth Johnston
Misamis Oriental	Lone	Nene Pimentel
Misamis Oriental	Lone	Rolando Piit
Misamis Oriental	Lone	Felino Neri
Misamis Oriental	Lone	Pablo Reyes
Mountain Province	Lone	William Claver
Mountain Province	Lone	Felix Diaz Sr.
Negros Occidental	1st	Carlos Ledesma
Negros Occidental	1st	Rodolfo Gamboa
Negros Occidental	1st	Benito Montinola Sr.
Negros Occidental	1st	Emmanuel Aguilar
Negros Occidental	1st	Ramon Hortinela Jr.
Negros Occidental	1st	Romeo Gonzaga
Negros Occidental	2nd	Arsenio Yulo Jr.
Negros Occidental	2nd	Carlos Hilado
Negros Occidental	2nd	Loreto Valera
Negros Occidental	3rd	Gregorio Tingson
Negros Occidental	3rd	Plaridel Villadelgado
Negros Occidental	3rd	Jacinto Montilla
Negros Occidental	3rd	Juan Yulo
Negros Oriental	1st	Margarito Teves
Negros Oriental	1st	Gonzalo Catan Jr.
Negros Oriental	1st	Vicente Sinco
Negros Oriental	1st	Cicero Calderon
Negros Oriental	2nd	Emilio Macias II
Negros Oriental	2nd	Felix Gaudiel Sr.
Northern Samar	Lone	Emil Ong
Northern Samar	Lone	Cesar Sevilla
Nueva Ecija	1st	Romeo Capulong
Nueva Ecija	1st	Ernesto Rondon
Nueva Ecija	1st	Rebeck Espiritu
Nueva Ecija	2nd	Juan Liwag
Nueva Ecija	2nd	Emmanuel Santos
Nueva Ecija	2nd	Sedfrey Ordoñez
Nueva Ecija	2nd	Raymundo Padiernos
Nueva Vizcaya	Lone	Jose Calderon
Nueva Vizcaya	Lone	Demetrio Quirino Jr.
Occidental Mindoro	Lone	Ricardo Quintos
Occidental Mindoro	Lone	Honofre Restor
Oriental Mindoro	Lone	Jose Leido
Oriental Mindoro	Lone	Juan Luces Luna
Oriental Mindoro	Lone	Amado Tolentino Jr.
Palawan	Lone	Alfredo Abueg Jr.
Palawan	Lone	Jose Nolledo
Pampanga	1st	Diosdado Macapagal
Pampanga	1st	Amado Yuzon
Pampanga	1st	Jose Suarez
Pampanga	1st	Fidel Zosimo Canilao
Pampanga	2nd	Amelito Mutuc
Pampanga	2nd	Ricardo Sagmit Jr.
Pampanga	2nd	Bren Guiao
Pangasinan	1st	Mauro Baradi
Pangasinan	1st	Jose Bengzon Jr.
Pangasinan	2nd	Luis Catubig
Pangasinan	2nd	Numeriano Tanopo Jr.
Pangasinan	3rd	Ricardo Primicias
Pangasinan	3rd	Emiliano Abalos
Pangasinan	4th	Reynaldo Villar
Pangasinan	4th	Jose Aruego
Pangasinan	5th	Felix Mamenta Jr.
Pangasinan	5th	Jesus Reyes
Quezon	1st	Rodolfo Robles
Quezon	1st	Edgardo Angara
Quezon	1st	Vicente Recto
Quezon	1st	Leandro Garcia
Quezon	2nd	Gil Puyat Jr.
Quezon	2nd	Cesar Caliwara
Quezon	2nd	Oscar Santos
Quezon	2nd	Benjamin Campomanes
Rizal	1st	Raul Manglapus
Rizal	1st	Jesus Barrera
Rizal	1st	Enrique Voltaire Garcia
Rizal	1st	Salvador Araneta
Rizal	1st	Jose Concepcion Jr.
Rizal	1st	Jose Mari Velez
Rizal	1st	Jose Feria
Rizal	1st	Augusto Kalaw
Rizal	1st	Jose Maria Paredes
Rizal	1st	Miguel Cuaderno Sr.
Rizal	1st	Teofisto Guingona Jr.
Rizal	1st	Leonardo Siguion Reyna
Rizal	1st	Ceferino Padua
Rizal	1st	Alejandro Lichauco
Rizal	1st	Tomas Benitez
Rizal	1st	Mary Rose Ezpeleta
Rizal	1st	Augusto Caesar Espiritu
Rizal	1st	Augusto Syjuco Jr.
Rizal	2nd	Pacifico Ortiz
Rizal	2nd	Gilberto Duavit
Rizal	2nd	Emilio de la Paz Jr.
Rizal	2nd	Francisco Sumulong
Rizal	2nd	Augusto Sanchez
Romblon	Lone	Manuel Martinez
Romblon	Lone	Ernesto Ang
Samar	Lone	Decoroso Rosales
Samar	Lone	Romualdo Mendiola
Samar	Lone	Ramon Mijares
Samar	Lone	Valeriano Yancha
Sorsogon	1st	Pacifico Lim
Sorsogon	1st	Bonifacio Gillego
Sorsogon	2nd	Jose Lachica
Sorsogon	2nd	Celso Tabuena
South Cotabato	Lone	Rodolfo Ortiz
South Cotabato	Lone	Tomas Falgui
South Cotabato	Lone	Fidel Purisima
South Cotabato	Lone	Arturo Pingoy
Southern Leyte	Lone	Gabriel Yñiguez
Southern Leyte	Lone	Federico de la Plana
Sulu	Lone	Jal Anni
Sulu	Lone	Tating Sangkula
Sulu	Lone	Benjamin Abubakar
Surigao del Norte	Lone	Constantino Navarro Jr.
Surigao del Norte	Lone	Fanny Garcia
Surigao del Sur	Lone	Vicente Pimentel
Surigao del Sur	Lone	Eriberto Misa
Tarlac	1st	Mercedes Cojuangco Teodoro
Tarlac	1st	Homobono Sawit
Tarlac	2nd	Jose Feliciano
Tarlac	2nd	Ramon Nisce
Zambales	Lone	Dick Gordon
Zambales	Lone	Enrique Corpus
Zambales	Lone	Luis Santos
Zamboanga del Norte	Lone	Augusto Saguin
Zamboanga del Norte	Lone	Adolfo Azcuna
Zamboanga del Norte	Lone	Ernesto Amatong
Zamboanga del Sur	Lone	Vincenzo Sagun
Zamboanga del Sur	Lone	Roseller T. Lim
Zamboanga del Sur	Lone	Wilfredo Cainglet
Zamboanga del Sur	Lone	Antonio Ceniza
Zamboanga del Sur	Lone	Maria Clara Lobregat
Zamboanga del Sur	Lone	Teodoro Araneta
Zamboanga del Sur	Lone	Pedro Rodriguez Jr.
Zamboanga del Sur	Lone	Ramon Blancia
Zamboanga del Sur	Lone	Benjamin Rodriguez

== See also ==
- Philippine Constitutional Convention of 1971
- Commission on Elections
- Politics of the Philippines
- Philippine elections
- Philippine Constitution
