= Lobregat =

Lobregat may refer to:

== People ==
- Maria Clara Lobregat (1921–2004), Filipino politician
- Celso Lobregat (born 1948), Filipino politician
- Virgilio Lobregat (1901–1944), Filipino sportsman

== Other uses ==
- Maria Clara L. Lobregat Highway, highway in the Philippines
