= Alfredo Abueg Jr. =

Filipino lawyer and politician (1932–2024)

- Abueg in 2020

Deputy Speaker of the House of Representatives of the Philippines for Luzon
- In office July 28, 1998 – November 22, 2000
- Speaker: Manny Villar
- Preceded by: Hernando Perez
- Succeeded by: Butz Aquino

Member of the Philippine House of Representatives from Palawan's 2nd district
- In office June 30, 1992 – June 30, 2001
- Preceded by: Ramon Mitra Jr.
- Succeeded by: Abraham Mitra

Member of the 1971 Constitutional Convention from Palawan
- In office June 1, 1971 – December 1, 1972

Commissioner of the Commission on Elections
- In office December 16, 1987 – January 20, 1992
- Appointed by: Corazon Aquino

Mayor of Puerto Princesa
- OIC
- In office March 3, 1986 – November 2, 1987
- Preceded by: Feliberto Oliveros Jr.
- Succeeded by: Higinio Mendoza Jr.

Personal details
- Born: Alfredo Edora Abueg Jr. November 2, 1932 Puerto Princesa, Palawan, Philippine Islands
- Died: November 19, 2024 (aged 92)
- Party: LDP (1992–1995); Lakas (1995–1998); LAMMP (1998–2001)
- Spouse: Nellie Fabello
- Education: Manuel L. Quezon University (LLB)
- Profession: Lawyer

Alfredo "Amor" Edora Abueg Jr. (November 2, 1932 – November 19, 2024) was a Filipino lawyer and politician. He represented Palawan's 2nd congressional district in the House of Representatives from 1992 to 2001 and was elected House deputy speaker for Luzon in 1998.

== Early life and education ==
Abueg was born on November 2, 1932, in Puerto Princesa, Palawan, to Governor Alfredo M. Abueg Sr. and Maria Edora. He attended Manuel L. Quezon University, where he received his Bachelor of Laws degree in 1961, and passed the bar examination the following year.

== Career ==
Abueg's political career began with his election as senior delegate from Palawan to the 1971 Constitutional Convention, alongside fellow lawyer Jose Nolledo. He served as vice-chairman of the Committee on Civil and Political Rights. On March 3, 1986, President Corazon Aquino appointed him officer-in-charge mayor of Puerto Princesa, serving until November 2, 1987. In December of the same year, Aquino appointed Abueg commissioner of the Commission on Elections.

In 1992, Abueg ran for the House of Representatives to represent Palawan's 2nd congressional district, winning three consecutive terms and serving until 2001. During his congressional tenure, he was elected deputy speaker for Luzon in July 1998 during the 11th Congress, and stepped down from the position in November 2000.

Abueg authored several laws relating to education, including Republic Act No. 7818, which converted Palawan State College into Palawan State University; Republic Act No. 8012, which renamed the Palawan National Agricultural College in Aborlan, Palawan, as the State Polytechnic College of Palawan; and Republic Act No. 8189, or the "Voter's Registration Act of 1996".

== Personal life ==
Abueg was married to pediatrician Nellie San Juan Fabello, with whom he had four children: Maria Elena, Frederick, Alfred, and Cyrille.

Abueg died on November 19, 2024, at the age of 92.

== Electoral history ==
Electoral history of Alfredo Abueg Jr.
Year	Office	Party	Votes received				Result
Year	Office	Party	Total	%	P.	Swing	Result
1970	Constitutional Convention Delegate (Palawan)	Nonpartisan	—N/a	—N/a	—N/a	—N/a	Won
1992	Representative (Palawan–2nd)	LDP	37,394	43.97%	1st	—N/a	Won
1995	Representative (Palawan–2nd)	Lakas	52,967	53.46%	1st	+9.49	Won
1998	Representative (Palawan–2nd)	Lakas	—N/a	—N/a	1st	—N/a	Won

House of Representatives of the Philippines
Preceded by Hernando Perez	Deputy Speaker of the House of Representatives of the Philippines for Luzon; July 28, 1998 – November 22, 2000	Succeeded by Butz Aquino
Preceded by Ramon Mitra Jr.	Member of the Philippine House of Representatives for Palawan's 2nd district June 30, 1992 – June 30, 2001	Succeeded by Abraham Mitra
Political offices
Preceded by Feliberto Oliveros Jr.	Mayor of Puerto Princesa (OIC); March 3, 1986 – November 2, 1987	Succeeded by Higinio Mendoza Jr.
