= ANGAT Partylist =

Political party in the Philippines

ANGAT
- — Philippine partylist —
- Full name: Agrikultura Ngayon Gawing Akma at Tama
- Abbreviation: ANGAT
- Type: Sectoral organization
- Sector(s) represented: Farmers
- Founded: 2022; 4 years ago

Website
- angatpartylist.seait-edu.ph

Agrikultura Ngayon Gawing Akma at Tama (ANGAT) is a political organization which had party-list representation in the House of Representatives of the Philippines.

== History ==
ANGAT pegs 2022 as its establishment date with South Cotabato governor Reynaldo Tamayo Jr. as its founder. It took part at the 2022 House of Representatives election also supported eventual president, Bongbong Marcos' electoral campaign. The partylist which names farmers as their constituents, is associated with the Tupi-based Tamayo political family.

The founder's father, Reynaldo Sr. filled the sole seat won by ANGAT. For the 19th Congress, Tamayor Sr. filed several bills as ANGAT's representative including proposals to impose logging and mining bans in Cagayan de Oro. He did not sign the impeachment complaint against Vice President Sara Duterte. He died in office on June 21, 2025, a few days before the end of the Congress.

ANGAT campaigned to retain its place in the lower house, participating in the 2025 election. The nominees include members of the Tamayo family including first nominee, Ghizelle Tamayo-Jimenea. Tamayo Sr. who later died in office was listed as a fourth nominee, while his wife Milagros is the seventh nominee. Reynaldo Jr. is the president of the ruling party Partido Federal ng Pilipinas of Marcos Jr. at around this time. ANGAT failed to retain their seat.

== Electoral history ==
Election	Votes	%	Seats
2022	530,485	1.46	1 / 63
2025	229,707	0.55	0 / 63

== Representatives to Congress ==
Period	Representative
19th Congress; 2022–2025	Reynaldo Tamayo Sr.
Note: A party-list group, can win a maximum of three seats in the House of Representatives.
