= Philippine Constitutional Convention of 1971 =

25th legislative term of the Philippines

- Constitutional convention

Type
- Type: Unicameral

History
- Founded: June 1, 1971
- Disbanded: November 29, 1972 (adjourned)
- Preceded by: Philippine Constitutional Convention of 1934
- Succeeded by: Philippine Constitutional Commission of 1986

Leadership
- President: Carlos P. Garcia (until June 14, 1971); Diosdado Macapagal (from June 14, 1971)
- President pro tempore: Sotero Laurel
- Seats: 320

Elections
- Last election: November 10, 1970

Meeting place
- Manila Hotel, Manila (until 1972)
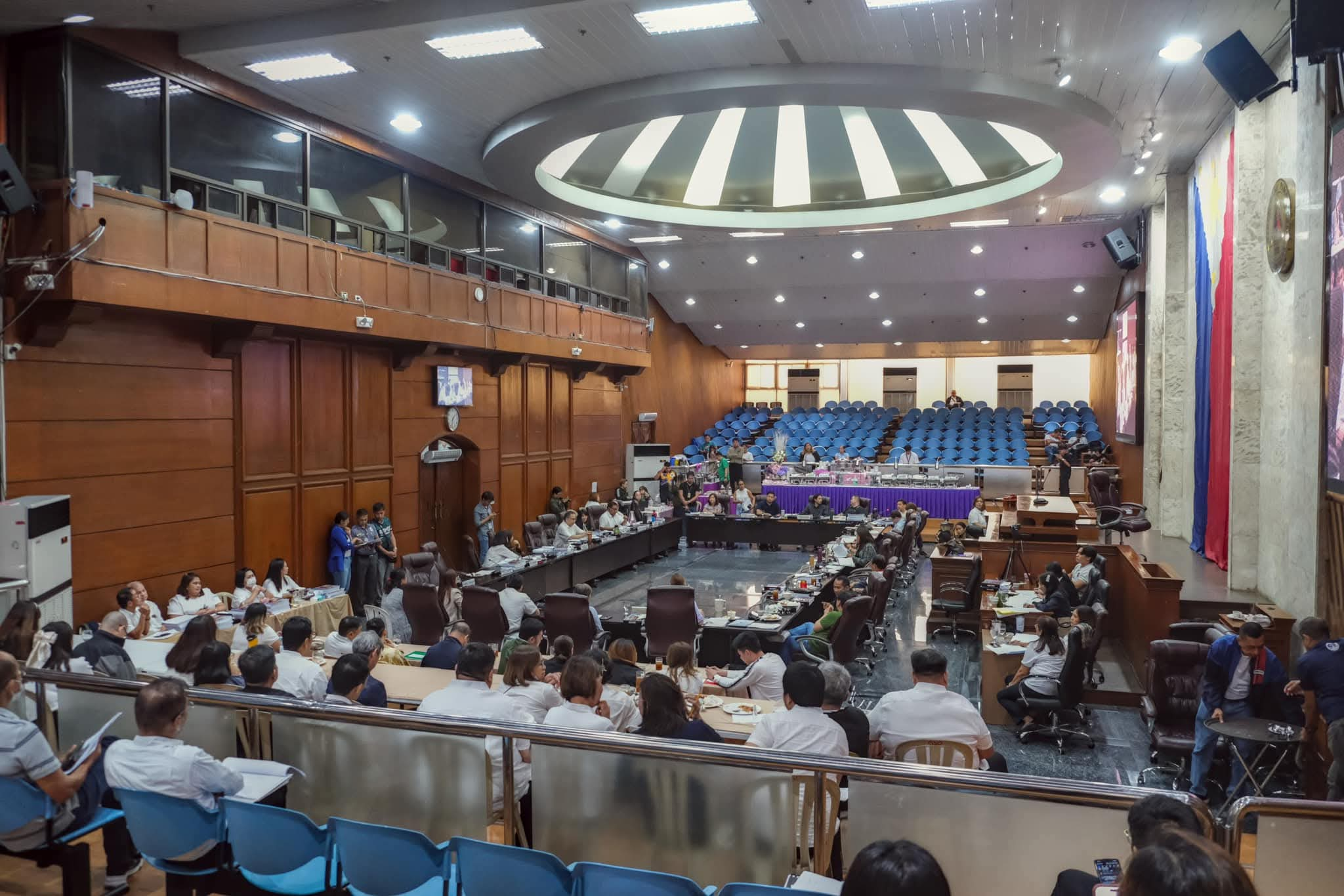
- Session Hall of the Quezon City Council, Quezon City Hall, Quezon City (from 1972)

Ex-President Diosdado Macapagal presiding over the 1971 Constitutional Convention.

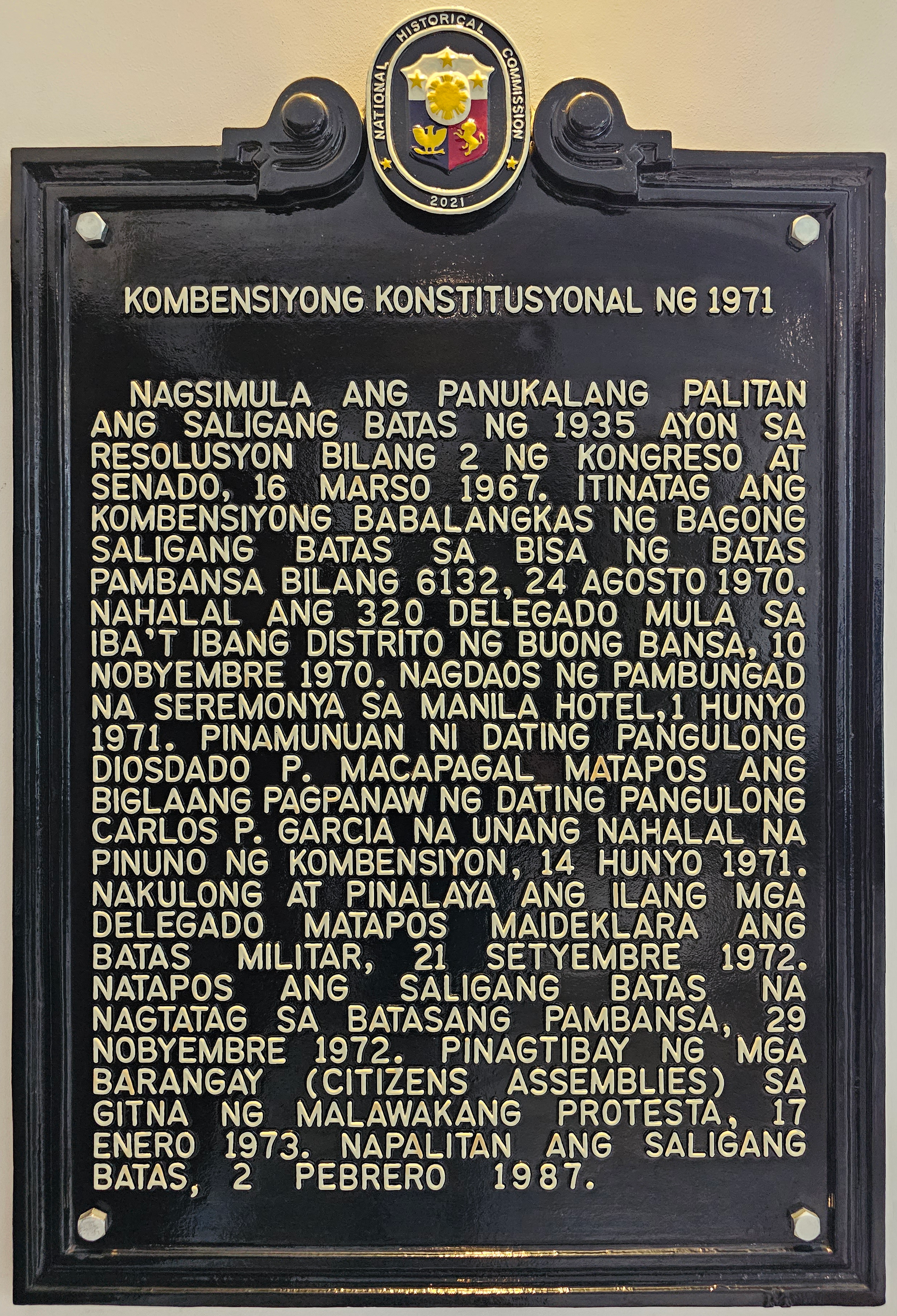
Historical marker created by the National Historical Commission of the Philippines to commemorate the 50th anniversary of the convention and installed inside the Manila Hotel.

The Philippine Constitutional Convention of 1971 was called to change the 1935 Constitution of the Philippines. The delegates were elected on November 10, 1970, and the convention itself was convened on June 1, 1971. It was marked by controversies, including efforts to uphold term limits for incumbent President Ferdinand Marcos, and a bribery scandal in which 14 people, including First Lady Imelda Marcos, were accused of bribing delegates to favor the Marcoses.

Marcos declared martial law in September 1972, and had 11 opposition delegates arrested. The remaining opposition delegates were forced to go either into exile or hiding. Within two months, an entirely new draft of the constitution was created from scratch by a special committee. The 1973 constitutional plebiscite was called to ratify the new constitution, but the validity of the ratification was brought to question because Marcos replaced the method of voting through secret ballot with a system of viva voce voting by "citizens' assemblies". The ratification of the constitution was challenged in what came to be known as the Ratification Cases.

== Background ==
=== The 1935 Constitution ===
By the middle of the 1930s, the end of the American occupation of the Philippines was supposed to be in sight. In 1934 the US had approved a ten-year plan for the Philippines' transition from a commonwealth to a fully independent nation-state, based on the Jones Act of 1916. One of the preconditions for this independence was the creation of "a stable democratic government" based on the American model of governance, rather than being based on the French model as the Malolos Constitution had been.

Although World War II interfered with the transition plan and a puppet constitution was put in place by the Japanese Imperial Army from 1943 until the defeat of the Japanese forces in 1944, the Philippines was granted independence on July 4, 1946. Upon independence, the 1935 constitution came into effect, featuring a government structure very similar to that of the United States: an executive branch with a President who could be elected to a maximum of two four-year terms; a bicameral legislature consisting of a congress and a senate; and an independent judicial branch.

=== Campaign to change the 1935 Constitution ===
In 1967, the executive branch was headed by the tenth president, Ferdinand Marcos. Expressing opposition to the administration's policies and citing rising discontent over wide inequalities in society, critics of Marcos began campaigning to change a constitution which they said had been written under the dominion of the country's former colonial overlords. On March 16 of that year, the Philippine Congress constituted itself into a Constituent Assembly and passed Resolution No. 2, which called for a Constitutional Convention to change the 1935 Constitution.

Marcos surprised his critics by endorsing the move, and it was later revealed that the resulting Constitutional Convention would lay the foundation for the legal justifications Marcos would use to extend his term past the two four-year terms allowable under the 1935 Constitution.

== Convention leadership and members ==
A special election was held on November 10, 1970, to elect the delegates of the convention. Once the winners had been determined, the convention was convened on June 1, 1971, at the Manila Hotel and was later transferred in 1972 to the then-newly completed Quezon City Hall.

=== Leadership ===
Former Philippine President Carlos P. Garcia was sworn in as the President of the Constitutional Convention on the day the convention was convened, but died thirteen days after taking oath. Former President Diosdado Macapagal replaced Garcia. Sotero H. Laurel served as the President Pro-Tempore of the convention.

President of the Convention

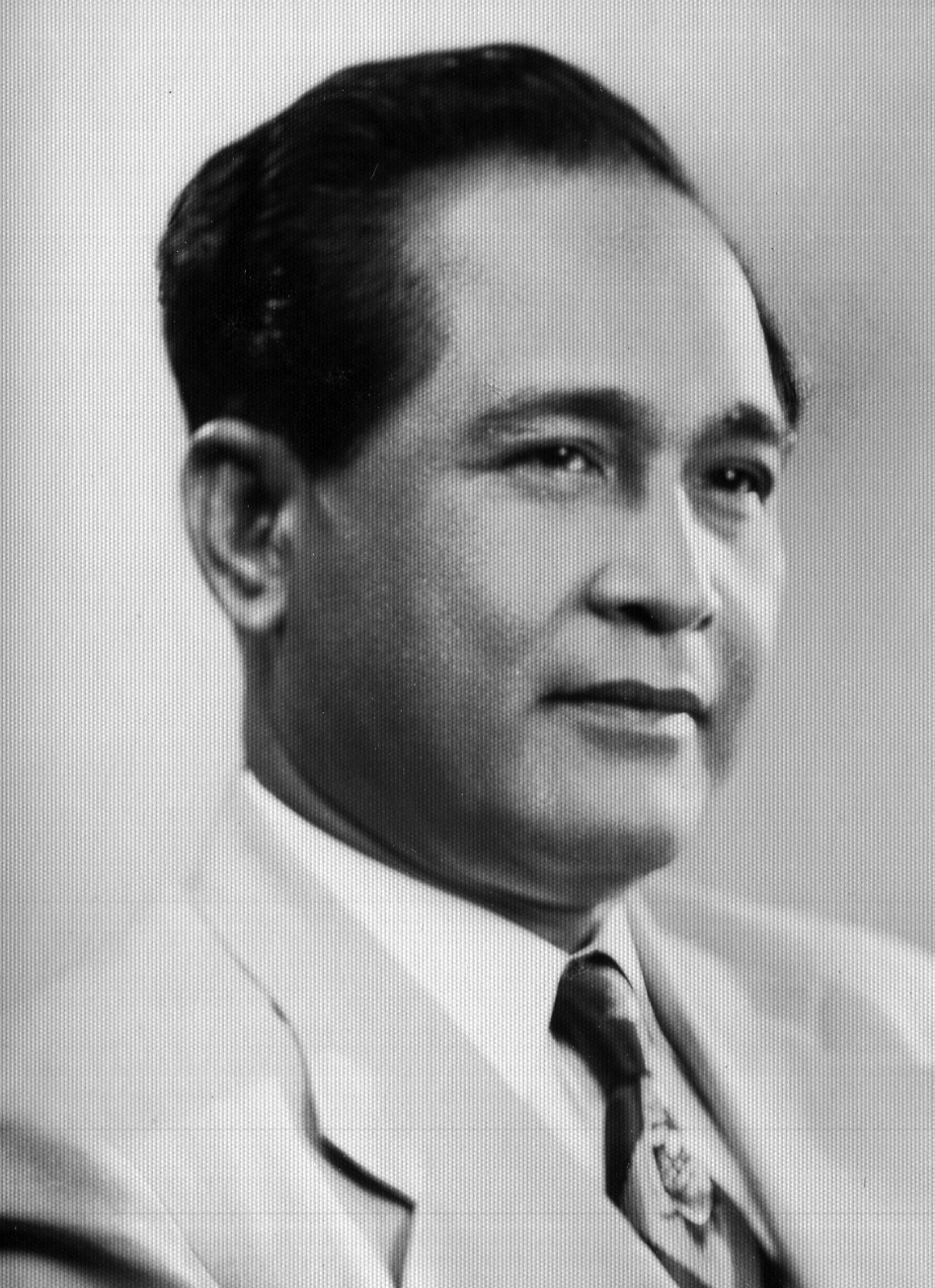
Carlos P. Garcia,
until June 14, 1971

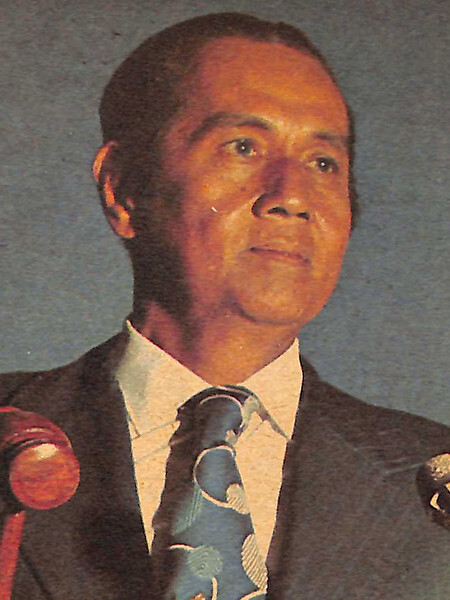
Diosdado Macapagal,
from June 14, 1971

- President:
  - Carlos P. Garcia (Bohol–3rd), until June 14, 1971
  - Diosdado Macapagal (Pampanga–1st), from June 14, 1971
- President pro tempore: Sotero Laurel (Batangas–3rd)

=== Members ===
A total of 320 delegates were elected to the convention, the most prominent being former senators Raul Manglapus and Roseller T. Lim. Other delegates would become influential political figures, including Hilario Davide Jr., Marcelo Fernan, Sotero Laurel, Nene Pimentel, Teofisto Guingona Jr., Raul Roco, Edgardo Angara, Dick Gordon, Margarito Teves, and Federico dela Plana.

Province/City	District	Delegates
Abra	Lone	Arturo Barbero
Abra	Lone	Loreto Seares
Agusan del Norte	Lone	Edelmiro Amante
Agusan del Norte	Lone	Antonio Tupaz
Agusan del Sur	Lone	Vicente Guzman
Agusan del Sur	Lone	Lamberto Mordeno
Aklan	Lone	Augusto Legaspi
Aklan	Lone	Godofredo Ramos
Albay	1st	Jose Madrilejos Jr.
Albay	1st	Salvador Balane
Albay	2nd	Domingo Imperial Jr.
Albay	2nd	Julian Locsin
Albay	3rd	Elfren Sarte
Albay	3rd	Teresita Flores
Antique	Lone	Angel Salazar Jr.
Antique	Lone	Arturo Pacificador
Bataan	Lone	Jose Nuguid
Bataan	Lone	Armando Abad Sr.
Batanes	Lone	Geronimo Cabal
Batanes	Lone	Custodio Villalva
Batangas	1st	Felixberto Serrano
Batangas	1st	Antonio de las Alas
Batangas	2nd	Honesto Mendoza
Batangas	2nd	Jose Leviste Jr.
Batangas	2nd	Antonio Alano
Batangas	3rd	Sotero Laurel
Batangas	3rd	Artemio Lobrin
Batangas	3rd	Oscar Leviste
Benguet	Lone	Floro Bugnosen
Benguet	Lone	Fernando Bautista
Bohol	1st	Natalio Castillo Jr.
Bohol	1st	Victor de la Serna
Bohol	2nd	Teogenes Borja
Bohol	2nd	Jose Zafra
Bohol	3rd	Carlos P. Garcia (Note: Carlos P. Garcia died on June 14, 1971.)
Bohol	3rd	Simplicio Apalisok
Bukidnon	Lone	Dante Sarraga
Bukidnon	Lone	Moro Lorenzo
Bukidnon	Lone	Alfredo Lagamon
Bulacan	1st	Pablo Trillana III
Bulacan	1st	Dakila Castro
Bulacan	1st	Mateo Caparas
Bulacan	2nd	Manuel Cruz
Bulacan	2nd	Justino Hermoso
Bulacan	2nd	Cesar Serapio
Bulacan	2nd	Magtanggol C. Gunigundo
Cagayan	1st	Manuel Molina
Cagayan	1st	Jose Antonio
Cagayan	1st	Pedro Laggui
Cagayan	2nd	Leoncio Puzon
Cagayan	2nd	Oscar Lazo
Camarines Norte	Lone	Rogelio Panotes
Camarines Norte	Lone	Fernando Vinzons
Camarines Sur	1st	Raul Roco
Camarines Sur	1st	Ramon Diaz
Camarines Sur	1st	Antonio Sison
Camarines Sur	2nd	Edmundo B. Cea
Camarines Sur	2nd	Domingo Guevarra
Camarines Sur	2nd	Eddie Alanis
Camarines Sur	2nd	Felix Alfelor Jr.
Camarines Sur	2nd	Lilia de Lima
Camiguin	Lone	Pedro Romualdo
Camiguin	Lone	Antonio Borromeo
Capiz	1st	Enrique Belo
Capiz	1st	George Viterbo
Capiz	2nd	Dandy Tupaz
Capiz	2nd	Pedro Exmundo
Catanduanes	Lone	Clemente Abundo
Catanduanes	Lone	Rafael Santelices
Cavite	Lone	Juanito Remulla Sr.
Cavite	Lone	Abraham Sarmiento
Cavite	Lone	Jose Santillan
Cavite	Lone	Alberto Jamir
Cebu	1st	Lydia Rodriguez
Cebu	1st	Casimiro Madarang Jr.
Cebu	2nd	Pedro Yap
Cebu	2nd	Marcelo Fernan
Cebu	2nd	Natalio Bacalso
Cebu	2nd	Jesus Garcia
Cebu	3rd	Napoleon Rama
Cebu	3rd	Antonio Bacaltos
Cebu	4th	Oliveros Kintanar
Cebu	4th	Hilario Davide Jr.
Cebu	5th	Jorge Kintanar
Cebu	5th	Pedro Calderon
Cebu	6th	Andres Flores
Cebu	6th	Francis Zosa
Cebu	7th	Antonio de Pio
Cebu	7th	Gerardo Pepito
Cotabato	Lone	Midpantao Adil
Cotabato	Lone	Antonio Velasco
Cotabato	Lone	Sandiale Sambolawan
Cotabato	Lone	Duma Sinsuat
Cotabato	Lone	Linda Ampatuan
Cotabato	Lone	Anacleto Badoy Jr.
Cotabato	Lone	Macario Camello
Cotabato	Lone	Michael Mastura
Cotabato	Lone	Sergio Tocao
Cotabato	Lone	Jose Estaniel
Davao del Norte	Lone	Gaudioso Buen
Davao del Norte	Lone	Camilo Sabio
Davao del Norte	Lone	Ramon Tirol
Davao del Norte	Lone	Lauro Arabejo
Davao del Sur	Lone	Ismael Veloso
Davao del Sur	Lone	Leon Garcia Jr.
Davao del Sur	Lone	Pedro Castillo
Davao del Sur	Lone	Dominador Carillo
Davao del Sur	Lone	Samuel Occeña
Davao del Sur	Lone	Jesus Matas
Davao Oriental	Lone	Adolfo Angala
Davao Oriental	Lone	Antonio Olmedo
Eastern Samar	Lone	Generoso Juaban
Eastern Samar	Lone	Jaime Opinion
Ifugao	Lone	Gaspar Ponchinlan
Ifugao	Lone	Raymundo Baguilat
Ilocos Norte	1st	Antonio Raquiza
Ilocos Norte	1st	Federico Ablan Sr.
Ilocos Norte	2nd	Gregorio Paruganan
Ilocos Norte	2nd	Emerito Salva
Ilocos Sur	1st	Ramon Encarnacion
Ilocos Sur	1st	Melchor Padua Jr.
Ilocos Sur	2nd	Godofredo Reyes
Ilocos Sur	2nd	Eduardo Guirnalda
Iloilo	1st	Salvador Britanico
Iloilo	1st	Lourdes Trono
Iloilo	2nd	Emilio de la Cruz II
Iloilo	2nd	Oscar Ledesma
Iloilo	3rd	Manuel Locsin
Iloilo	3rd	Amanio Sorongon
Iloilo	4th	Ramon Gonzales
Iloilo	4th	Licurgo Tirador
Iloilo	5th	Sonia Aldeguer
Iloilo	5th	Juan Borra
Isabela	Lone	Benjamin Reyes
Isabela	Lone	Heherson Alvarez
Isabela	Lone	Francisco Albano Jr.
Isabela	Lone	Celso Gangan
Isabela	Lone	Leocadio Ignacio
Kalinga-Apayao	Lone	Infante Calaycay
Kalinga-Apayao	Lone	Eubulo Verzola
La Union	1st	Victor Ortega
La Union	1st	Pedro Valdez
La Union	2nd	Antonio de Guzman
La Union	2nd	Agaton Yaranon Jr.
Laguna	1st	Jose Yulo Jr.
Laguna	1st	Manuel Concordia
Laguna	1st	Amado Garcia
Laguna	1st	Vicente Hocson
Laguna	2nd	Estanislao Fernandez
Laguna	2nd	Rustico de los Reyes Jr.
Lanao del Norte	Lone	Francisco Abalos
Lanao del Norte	Lone	Mariano Badelles
Lanao del Norte	Lone	Luis Quibranza
Lanao del Sur	Lone	Domocao Alonto
Lanao del Sur	Lone	Mangontawar Guro
Lanao del Sur	Lone	Lininding Pangandaman
Lanao del Sur	Lone	Tocod Macaraya
Lanao del Sur	Lone	Oga Mapupuno
Lanao del Sur	Lone	Pangalian Balindong
Leyte	1st	Cirilo Roy Montejo
Leyte	1st	Eduardo Quintero
Leyte	2nd	Damian Aldaba
Leyte	2nd	Francisco Astilla Sr.
Leyte	3rd	Ramon Salazar
Leyte	3rd	Antero Bongbong
Leyte	4th	Domingo Veloso
Leyte	4th	Flor Larrazabal-Sagadal
Manila	1st	Reynaldo Fajardo
Manila	1st	Salvador Mariño
Manila	1st	Fidel Santiago
Manila	2nd	Roberto Oca
Manila	2nd	Juan David
Manila	3rd	Gerardo Espina Sr.
Manila	3rd	Eduardo Sison
Manila	3rd	Feliciano Jover Ledesma
Manila	4th	Carlos Valdes
Manila	4th	Jose Marcelo
Manila	4th	Antonio Araneta Jr.
Marinduque	Lone	Carmencita Reyes
Marinduque	Lone	Ricardo Nepomuceno Jr.
Masbate	Lone	Andres Clemente Jr.
Masbate	Lone	Raul Estrella
Masbate	Lone	Mateo Esparrago Jr.
Masbate	Lone	Venancio Yaneza
Misamis Occidental	Lone	Timoteo Ruben
Misamis Occidental	Lone	Julio Ozamiz
Misamis Occidental	Lone	Elizabeth Johnston
Misamis Oriental	Lone	Nene Pimentel
Misamis Oriental	Lone	Rolando Piit
Misamis Oriental	Lone	Felino Neri (Note: Felino Neri died on January 2, 1972.)
Misamis Oriental	Lone	Pablo Reyes
Mountain Province	Lone	William Claver
Mountain Province	Lone	Felix Diaz Sr.
Negros Occidental	1st	Carlos Ledesma
Negros Occidental	1st	Rodolfo Gamboa
Negros Occidental	1st	Benito Montinola Sr.
Negros Occidental	1st	Emmanuel Aguilar
Negros Occidental	1st	Ramon Hortinela Jr.
Negros Occidental	1st	Romeo Gonzaga
Negros Occidental	2nd	Arsenio Yulo Jr.
Negros Occidental	2nd	Carlos Hilado
Negros Occidental	2nd	Loreto Valera
Negros Occidental	3rd	Gregorio Tingson
Negros Occidental	3rd	Plaridel Villadelgado
Negros Occidental	3rd	Jacinto Montilla
Negros Occidental	3rd	Juan Yulo
Negros Oriental	1st	Margarito Teves
Negros Oriental	1st	Gonzalo Catan Jr.
Negros Oriental	1st	Vicente Sinco
Negros Oriental	1st	Cicero Calderon
Negros Oriental	2nd	Emilio Macias II
Negros Oriental	2nd	Felix Gaudiel Sr.
Northern Samar	Lone	Emil Ong
Northern Samar	Lone	Cesar Sevilla
Nueva Ecija	1st	Romeo Capulong
Nueva Ecija	1st	Ernesto Rondon
Nueva Ecija	1st	Rebeck Espiritu
Nueva Ecija	2nd	Juan Liwag
Nueva Ecija	2nd	Emmanuel Santos
Nueva Ecija	2nd	Sedfrey Ordoñez
Nueva Ecija	2nd	Raymundo Padiernos
Nueva Vizcaya	Lone	Jose Calderon
Nueva Vizcaya	Lone	Demetrio Quirino Jr.
Occidental Mindoro	Lone	Ricardo Quintos
Occidental Mindoro	Lone	Honofre Restor
Oriental Mindoro	Lone	Jose Leido
Oriental Mindoro	Lone	Juan Luces Luna
Oriental Mindoro	Lone	Amado Tolentino Jr.
Palawan	Lone	Alfredo Abueg Jr.
Palawan	Lone	Jose Nolledo
Pampanga	1st	Diosdado Macapagal
Pampanga	1st	Amado Yuzon
Pampanga	1st	Jose Suarez
Pampanga	1st	Fidel Zosimo Canilao
Pampanga	2nd	Amelito Mutuc
Pampanga	2nd	Ricardo Sagmit Jr.
Pampanga	2nd	Bren Guiao
Pangasinan	1st	Mauro Baradi
Pangasinan	1st	Jose Bengzon Jr.
Pangasinan	2nd	Luis Catubig
Pangasinan	2nd	Numeriano Tanopo Jr.
Pangasinan	3rd	Ricardo Primicias
Pangasinan	3rd	Emiliano Abalos
Pangasinan	4th	Reynaldo Villar
Pangasinan	4th	Jose Aruego
Pangasinan	5th	Felix Mamenta Jr.
Pangasinan	5th	Jesus Reyes
Quezon	1st	Rodolfo Robles
Quezon	1st	Edgardo Angara
Quezon	1st	Vicente Recto
Quezon	1st	Leandro Garcia
Quezon	2nd	Gil Puyat Jr.
Quezon	2nd	Cesar Caliwara
Quezon	2nd	Oscar Santos
Quezon	2nd	Benjamin Campomanes
Rizal	1st	Raul Manglapus
Rizal	1st	Jesus Barrera
Rizal	1st	Enrique Voltaire Garcia
Rizal	1st	Salvador Araneta
Rizal	1st	Jose Concepcion Jr.
Rizal	1st	Jose Mari Velez
Rizal	1st	Jose Feria
Rizal	1st	Augusto Kalaw
Rizal	1st	Jose Maria Paredes
Rizal	1st	Miguel Cuaderno Sr.
Rizal	1st	Teofisto Guingona Jr.
Rizal	1st	Leonardo Siguion Reyna
Rizal	1st	Ceferino Padua
Rizal	1st	Alejandro Lichauco
Rizal	1st	Tomas Benitez (Note: Tomas Benitez died on October 19, 1971.)
Rizal	1st	Mary Rose Ezpeleta
Rizal	1st	Augusto Caesar Espiritu
Rizal	1st	Augusto Syjuco Jr.
Rizal	2nd	Pacifico Ortiz
Rizal	2nd	Gilberto Duavit
Rizal	2nd	Emilio de la Paz Jr.
Rizal	2nd	Francisco Sumulong
Rizal	2nd	Augusto Sanchez
Romblon	Lone	Manuel Martinez
Romblon	Lone	Ernesto Ang
Samar	Lone	Decoroso Rosales
Samar	Lone	Romualdo Mendiola
Samar	Lone	Ramon Mijares
Samar	Lone	Valeriano Yancha
Sorsogon	1st	Pacifico Lim
Sorsogon	1st	Bonifacio Gillego
Sorsogon	2nd	Jose Lachica
Sorsogon	2nd	Celso Tabuena
South Cotabato	Lone	Rodolfo Ortiz
South Cotabato	Lone	Tomas Falgui
South Cotabato	Lone	Fidel Purisima
South Cotabato	Lone	Arturo Pingoy
Southern Leyte	Lone	Gabriel Yñiguez
Southern Leyte	Lone	Federico de la Plana
Sulu	Lone	Jal Anni
Sulu	Lone	Tating Sangkula
Sulu	Lone	Benjamin Abubakar
Surigao del Norte	Lone	Constantino Navarro Jr.
Surigao del Norte	Lone	Fanny Garcia
Surigao del Sur	Lone	Vicente Pimentel
Surigao del Sur	Lone	Eriberto Misa
Tarlac	1st	Mercedes Cojuangco Teodoro
Tarlac	1st	Homobono Sawit
Tarlac	2nd	Jose Feliciano
Tarlac	2nd	Ramon Nisce
Zambales	Lone	Dick Gordon
Zambales	Lone	Enrique Corpus
Zambales	Lone	Luis Santos
Zamboanga del Norte	Lone	Augusto Saguin
Zamboanga del Norte	Lone	Adolfo Azcuna
Zamboanga del Norte	Lone	Ernesto Amatong
Zamboanga del Sur	Lone	Vincenzo Sagun
Zamboanga del Sur	Lone	Roseller T. Lim
Zamboanga del Sur	Lone	Wilfredo Cainglet
Zamboanga del Sur	Lone	Antonio Ceniza
Zamboanga del Sur	Lone	Maria Clara Lobregat
Zamboanga del Sur	Lone	Teodoro Araneta
Zamboanga del Sur	Lone	Pedro Rodriguez Jr.
Zamboanga del Sur	Lone	Ramon Blancia
Zamboanga del Sur	Lone	Benjamin Rodriguez

== Proposal of "Ban Marcos" provisions ==
Even as far back as 1967, when the creation of the Constitutional Convention was proposed, opposition politicians feared that Marcos would use the convention as a way to stay in power beyond the two four-year terms allowed him by the 1935 Constitution. Because of these fears, the original resolution in congress which called for the convention had a provision that would have required the proposed new Constitution to have a provision preventing Marcos or his wife Imelda from running for office after the end of his term in 1973. The provision was defeated in Congress by a narrow vote.

Members of the opposition who were elected as Constitutional Convention delegates nevertheless proposed such "Ban the Marcoses" provisions during the deliberations of the convention.

Soon after the Constitutional Convention was convened, 176 of the 206 delegates signed a resolution by delegate Napoleon Rama calling for a ban on the Marcoses. Later, the Committee on Suffrage and Election Reforms, chaired by Raul Manglapus, drafted a resolution which read:

No person who has served as President of the Philippines shall be eligible to occupy the same office or that of chief minister or chief executive any time in the future, nor shall his spouse or relatives to the second degree by consanguinity or affinity be eligible to occupy the same office during any unexpired portion of his term or in one immediately succeeding term.

Deliberations on these provisions dragged out due to partisan rambling, continuing until Marcos' declaration of martial law in September 1972. Rama was put in jail along with 10 other members of the opposition bloc, while numerous others, including Manglapus, were forced into hiding or exile. They were dropped from the Marcos-sponsored final draft of the constitution which was approved by the convention in November 1972.

== Eduardo Quintero's delegate bribery exposé ==
Already bogged down by politicking and delays, the credibility of the 1971 Constitutional Convention took a severe blow in May 1972 when a delegate exposed a bribery scheme in which delegates were paid to vote in favor of the Marcoses – with First Lady Imelda Marcos herself implicated in the alleged payola scheme.

Ever since the convention was convened, the "progressive bloc" of the convention believed that Marcos was influencing the proceedings through the votes of delegates allied to the Marcoses and Imelda's family, the Romualdezes. This suspicion was further strengthened on May 19, 1972, when Eduardo Quintero – a former Ambassador to the United Nations and the elected Constitutional Convention delegate for Leyte's first district – alleged that some of the delegates, including himself, had been receiving money from a "Money Lobby" in the convention. In his speech on the plenary, Quintero accused fellow delegates that were for the moment unnamed of bribing him P11,150 to vote in support of provisions that would prolong the political career of the Marcoses and against those that would hamper it. The major provisions that would have greatly impacted the political surivival of the Marcos family were the proposals to a shift to parliamentarianism which would have enabled President Marcos to run as Prime Minister unhampered by the term limits set in the presidential system of the 1935 constitution as well as the "Ban Marcos" provisions of Napoleon Rama. Quintero himself was politically indebted to the Marcoses because he was elected with the aid of Imelda Marcos' brother, but he said that he finally wanted "to do the correct thing".

Quintero eventually released a three-page sworn statement that named 14 persons involved in the bribery scheme. The list included 12 of Quintero's fellow Convention delegates, the wife of delegate Artemio Mate, and Imelda Marcos.

The exposé tainted the convention, angered the anti-Marcos opposition, and scandalized the country. Manila drivers plastered signs reading "Mabuhay Quintero!" ("Long Live Quintero!") on the sides of their cars in the days after Quintero's exposé. Later historians note that this would have jeopardized any efforts on Marcos' part to hold on to power beyond the two four-year terms allowed him by the 1935 Constitution, but the social unrest brought about by Marcos' 1970 debt crisis enabled him to stay in power anyway – by declaring martial law.

== September 1972 bombing ==
On September 18, 1972, the convention was targeted by one of the last 1972 Manila bombings – about 20 explosions in various locations in Metro Manila in the months after the Plaza Miranda bombing and immediately preceding Marcos' declaration of martial law.

== Arrest of opposition delegates ==
The work of the convention was affected by the declaration of martial law in September 1972 by President Marcos. The military units assigned to implement the law were given a list of 400 individuals to arrest, consisting mostly of outspoken critics of Marcos' administration. This included a number of members of the Constitutional Convention.

Some of the individuals on the list, such as Raul Manglapus, were either not in the Philippines when martial law was declared, while some, such as Raul Roco, were in the country but managed to evade arrest. However, numerous members of the Constitutional Convention's opposition bloc were among those arrested in the early hours of September 22, 1972. Convention delegates immediately arrested after the proclamation of martial law included:

- Napoleon Rama, who was also associate editor of the Philippines Free Press
- Jose Mari Velez, news anchor of ABC-5's The Big News (1967-1972)
- Bren Guiao
- Natalio Bacalzo
- Jose "Joecon" S. Concepcion Jr.
- Ernesto Rondon
- Jose "Pepito" Nolledo
- Teofisto "Tito" Guingona Jr.
- Alejandro "Ding" Lichuaco
- Voltaire Garcia and George Viterbo, who were later released

As recounted by oppositionist Convention delegate Caesar Espiritu, officials privy to variations of the priority arrest list eventually informed them which other Convention delegates had been put on the list. Aside from those actually arrested, one "shortlist" of 12 delegates identified six other delegates: Sonny Alvarez, Antonio "Tonypet" Araneta, Romy Capulong, Boni Gillego, Raul Manglapus, and Raul Roco. (Among those actually arrested, this list named Garcia, Guiao, Lichauco, Rama, Rondon, and Velez.)

The longest list the convention delegates were able to piece together listed a total of 32 delegates, identifying Bacalzo, Guingona, Concepcion, Nolledo, and Viterbo who were all arrested, and additionally mentioned "Delima (the only girl), Occeña, Badoy, Sanchez, the Espiritu brothers, Pepe Calderon, Kalaw, Father Ortiz, and Amatong".

With nearly a dozen of its members in jail and some of its most prominent leaders overseas or in hiding, the "progressive faction" of the convention which spoke against Marcos was no longer able to contribute to the discussion.

== Revised new draft Constitution ==
In contrast to the slow, contentious deliberations that marked its early days, the Convention moved quickly after Marcos had declared martial law. The opposition bloc had effectively been decimated and the threat of imprisonment hung over any delegates who might voice opposition in the convention. Macapagal thus allowed the regular rules of the convention to be suspended so that a 166-member group headed by Marcos-supporting delegate Gilberto Duavit came up with a new draft of the Constitution.

By November 29, 1972, a little over two months after the declaration of martial law, the Convention approved the draft, with Macapagal "reluctantly putting his signature" on a document that would give so much power to Marcos. It was presented to Marcos at the Malacañang palace on December 1, 1972, marking the end of the Constitutional Convention's task.

== 1973 constitutional plebiscite and the Ratification Cases ==
On January 5, 1973, Marcos, who had seized legislative power as part of his declaration of martial law, issued Presidential Decree No. 86-A, an addendum to the Revised Barrio Charter (Presidential Decree No. 86) which he had signed in late December to reconstitute Philippine barrios (villages) into a new structure called a "barangay". Presidential Decree No. 86-A cancelled the election plebiscite in which Philippine citizens would have voted whether or not to ratify the new Constitution. Instead, the 1973 Constitution would be ratified using "Citizen's Assemblies".

The Constitution was supposedly presented for the people's ratification in the 1973 constitutional plebiscite, where the Citizen's Assemblies supposedly showed their assent through viva voce votation. Due to the lack of reportage accompanying the gagging of the Philippine press during martial law, there are no reliable records of how many citizens actually participated in these assemblies. The results of the plebiscite were thus questioned before the Philippine Supreme Court in what came to be known as the Plebiscite Cases (Planas v. COMELEC (1973)), and the legality of the 1973 Constitution questioned in what came to be known as the Ratification Cases (Javellana v. Executive Secretary).

In the Ratification Cases, six of the 10 members of the court (the Chief Justice, and Justices Makalintal, Zaldivar, Castro, Fernando, and Teehankee) said that the 1973 Constitution had not been ratified validly. But Justices Makalintal and Castro said that the people had acquiesced to the 1973 Constitution whether or not the ratification was valid, saying that the question of whether the Constitution could be invalidated was a political determination and not a judicial one. The Constitution was thus effectively upheld.

Marcos would continue to rule as a dictator until being ousted by the People Power Revolution in 1986.

== See also ==
- Timeline of the Marcos dictatorship
- 1970 Philippine Constitutional Convention election
- Ratification Cases
