= Daisy Avance Fuentes =

Filipino politician

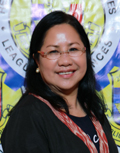
- Fuentes in 2016

Deputy Speaker of the House of Representatives of the Philippines for Mindanao
- In office July 28, 1998 – January 24, 2001
- Preceded by: Simeon Datumanong
- Succeeded by: Nur Jaafar

Member of the House of Representatives from South Cotabato's 2nd district
- In office June 30, 2010 – June 30, 2013
- Preceded by: Arthur Pingoy Jr.
- Succeeded by: Dinand Hernandez
- In office June 30, 1992 – June 30, 2001
- Preceded by: Hilario de Pedro III
- Succeeded by: Arthur Pingoy Jr.

4th and 6th Governor of South Cotabato
- In office June 30, 2013 – June 30, 2019
- Preceded by: Arthur Pingoy Jr.
- Succeeded by: Reynaldo Tamayo Jr.
- In office June 30, 2001 – June 30, 2010
- Preceded by: Hilario de Pedro III
- Succeeded by: Arthur Pingoy Jr.

Personal details
- Born: January 18, 1957 (age 69)
- Party: Lakas (until 2001); LAMMP (1998–2001); NPC (2001–present)

Daisy P. Avance Fuentes (born January 18, 1957) is a Filipino politician who was a member of the House of Representatives of the Philippines for the South Cotabato's 2nd congressional district from 2010 to 2013.

== Political career ==
She was the first woman to become Deputy Speaker of the House of Representatives of the Philippines from 1992 to 2001. Along with Maria Clara Lobregat and Luwalhati Antonino, she was one of the "Tres Marias", a trio who were openly critical against the signing of 1996 Final Peace Agreement between Ramos administration led by Manuel Yan and Moro National Liberation Front (MNLF) led by Nur Misuari. She was Governor of South Cotabato from 2001 to 2010 and from 2013 to 2019. In 2019, she was a candidate for Governor of South Cotabato in the 2019 elections.

== See also ==
- List of female members of the House of Representatives of the Philippines
- List of female governors in the Philippines
- 9th Congress of the Philippines
- 10th Congress of the Philippines
- 11th Congress of the Philippines
- 15th Congress of the Philippines

House of Representatives of the Philippines
Preceded by Simeon Datumanong	Deputy Speaker for Mindanao; July 28, 1998 – January 24, 2001	Succeeded by Nur Jaafar
Preceded by Arthur Pingoy Jr.	Member for South Cotabato's 2nd district June 30, 2010 – June 30, 2013 (June 30, 1992 – June 30, 2001)	Succeeded by Dinand Hernandez
Preceded by Hilario de Pedro III	Member for South Cotabato's 2nd district June 30, 2010 – June 30, 2013 (June 30, 1992 – June 30, 2001)	Succeeded by Arthur Pingoy Jr.
Political offices
Preceded by Arthur Pingoy Jr.	Governor of South Cotabato; June 30, 2013 – June 30, 2019 (June 30, 2001 – June 30, 2010)	Succeeded by Reynaldo Tamayo Jr.
Preceded by Hilario de Pedro III	Governor of South Cotabato; June 30, 2013 – June 30, 2019 (June 30, 2001 – June 30, 2010)	Succeeded by Arthur Pingoy Jr.
