= Angat =

Angat may refer to:

- Angat, Bulacan, a municipality in Bulacan, Philippines
- Angat River, a river Bulacan, Philippines
- ANGAT Partylist, a party-list in the Philippines
