= Tres Marias (Philippines) =

Group of congresswomen criticized 1996 Jakarta Peace Accords

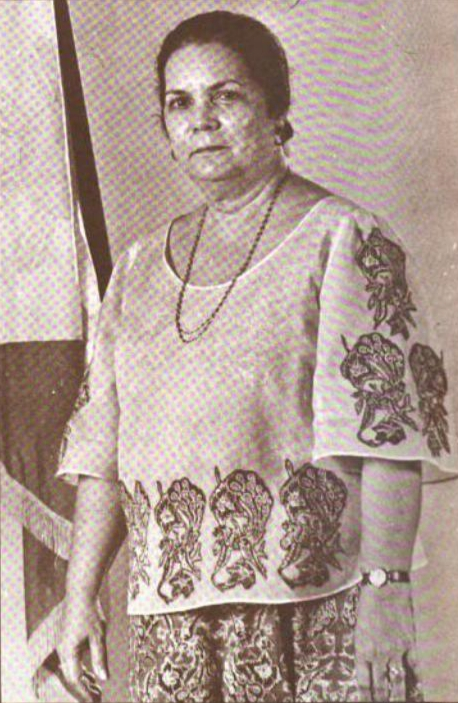
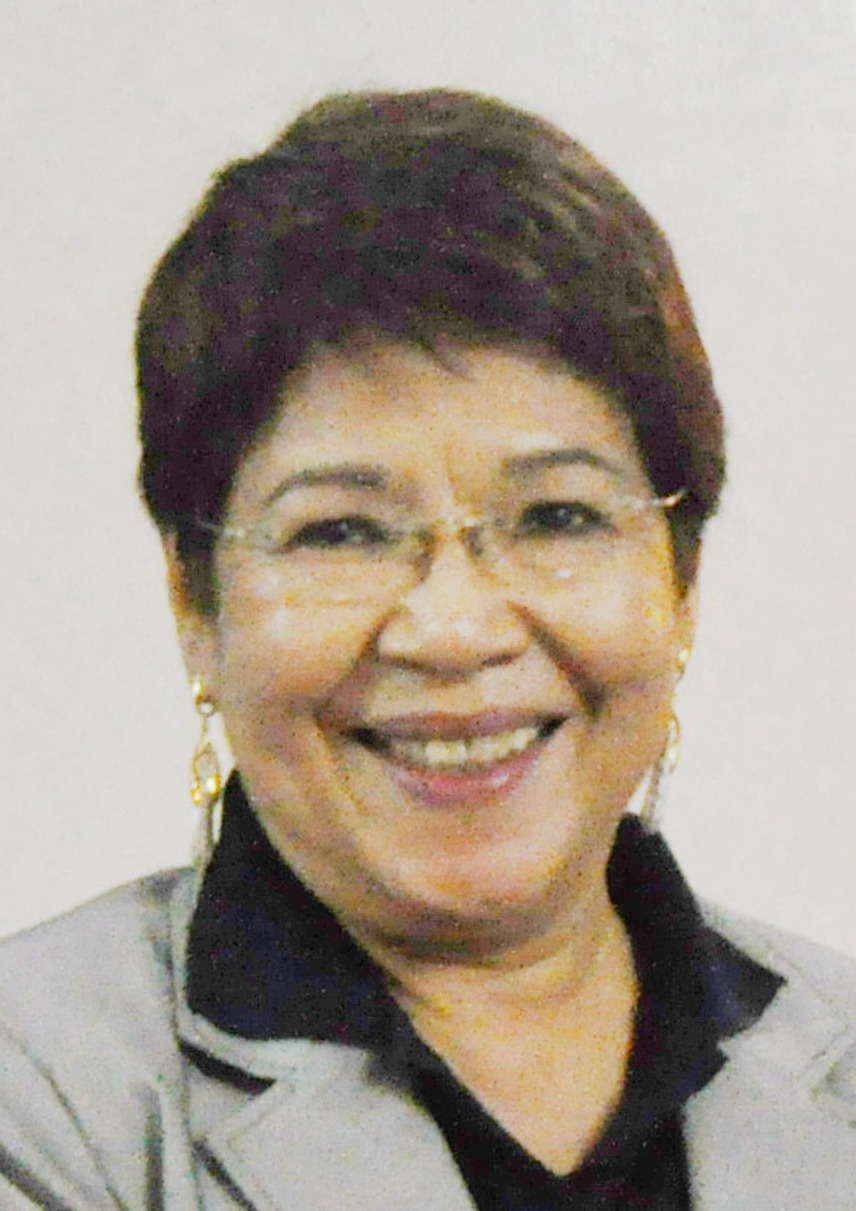
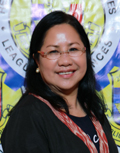
The Tres Marias

The Tres Marias (English: Three Marias) were trio of veteran congresswomen of the Philippine House of Representatives openly critical against the signing of 1996 Final Peace Agreement between Ramos administration led by Manuel Yan and Moro National Liberation Front (MNLF) led by Nur Misuari.

== Background ==
Three congresswomen from Mindanao composed of Maria Clara Lobregat, Luwalhati Antonino, and Daisy Avance Fuentes prominently in the protest against the creation of the Southern Philippines Council for Peace and Development (SPCPD) in 1996, which compose 16 Mindanao provinces and Palawan. They argue that it align provinces into "Moro territory". The trio went to Supreme court to fight against the accord signing. The three also argue that the signing will not resolve peace and order issue of the island.

One of them, Zamboanga City's Maria Clara Lobregat was a harsh critic of Moro National Liberation Front chair Nur Misuari, campaigned against the inclusion of Zamboanga City in the Autonomous Region in Muslim Mindanao in the law creation, deliberation, and its passing up to the 1989 plebiscite.

== Aftermath ==
Antonino was appointed as Chair of Mindanao Development Authority (MinDA) under the Noynoy Aquino administration from 2010 to 2016. She also agree that Aquino's administration did a lot for Mindanao's lasting peace, especially on its negotiations with MNLF's other faction, the Moro Islamic Liberation Front (MILF).

At the same administration, Lobregat's son Celso became a staunch critic of the Bangsamoro Basic Law which was being deliberated at that time.

== Composition ==
The faction consisted of:

1. Maria Clara Lobregat (LDP) – Lone district of Zamboanga City
2. Luwalhati Antonino (Lakas) – 1st district of South Cotabato
3. Daisy Avance Fuentes (NPC) – 2nd district of South Cotabato
