= Governor of South Cotabato =

Local chief executive

- Punong Panlalawigan ng Timog Kotabato
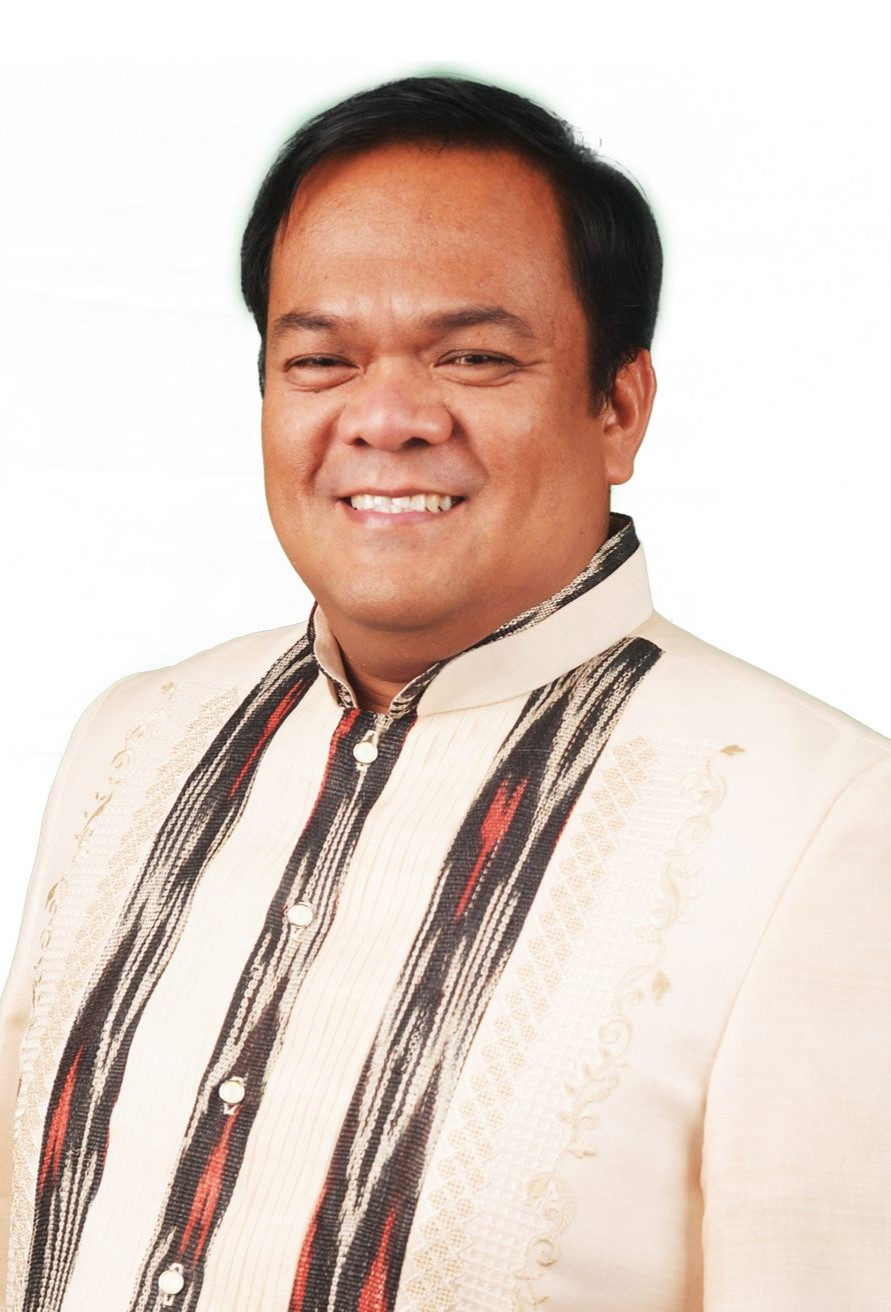
- Incumbent; Reynaldo Tamayo Jr. since June 30, 2019
- Style: Mme./Mr. Governor (informal); The Honourable (formal); His/Her Excellency (diplomatic)
- Appointer: Elected via popular vote
- Term length: 3 years, renewable
- Constituting instrument: Local Government Code of 1991
- Formation: 1967
- First holder: Sergio Morales
- Deputy: Vice-Governor of South Cotabato
- Website: https://southcotabato.gov.ph/

The governor of South Cotabato (Filipino: Punong Panlalawigan ng Timog Cotabato), is the chief executive of the provincial government of South Cotabato.

== Title ==
The official title of the South Cotabato head of state and government is "Governor of South Cotabato." The title in Filipino and other languages of the Philippines, predominantly the Bisayan languages, is Gobernador, from the Spanish language. The title in Tagalog however is Punong Panlalawigan, meaning "Provincial Chief" or "Provincial Head."

== History ==
When South Cotabato was created by virtue of Republic Act No. 4849 or "An Act creating the Province of South Cotabato", the Province officially functioned only after the 1967 Philippine local elections. Sergio Morales, M.D., the Province's inaugural Governor, served throughout the duration of former President Ferdinand Marcos' administration.

During this time, the powers of a Governor were considered insufficient and weak. Under the Local Autonomy Act of 1959 (Republic Act No. 2264) and the Decentralization Act of 1967 (Republic Act No. 5185), Provincial Governments were granted more powers and increased the composition of the Provincial Board. However, they still lacked necessary autonomous powers and the Provinces were considered as an extension of the National Government, rather than its own local authority.

Under former President Marcos' administration, the autonomy of Provinces were greatly increased through the introduction of Batas Pambansa Blg. 51 (or National Law No. 51), which eliminated direct municipal representation in the provincial legislature (previously introduced through Presidential Decree No. 826, s. 1975), introduced a system of indirect "grassroots" representation (which were the President of the provincial association of barangay chairmen and the President of the provincial federation of the Kabataang Barangay), and made the Governor and Vice-Governor ex-officio members of the provincial legislature. In 1983, the Batasang Pambansa passed the Local Government Code of 1983 or Batas Pambansa Blg. 337 (or National Law No. 337). This expanded the powers of the governor, allowing the governor to vote (only to break a tie) in the provincial legislature, to veto any items within a Bill or veto the entirety of an Ordinance or Resolution. However, the veto can be overridden by a two-thirds vote of all voting Sangguniang Panlalawigan members.

After the People's Power Revolution, there were significant changes. First, the term length of the Governor and other local officials were reduced from 4 years to 3 years in accordance with the 1987 Constitution. Second, in 1991, the Congress passed the Local Government Code of 1991 (Republic Act No. 7160), which removed the Governor as an ex-officio member of the provincial legislature (although the Governor retains the powers granted from the 1983 Code), the Vice-Governor is the presiding officer of the provincial legislature, and the size of the provincial legislature is dependent on its income classification, rather than its population.

== Powers, oath, election and term of office ==
=== Qualifications ===
In accordance with Section 39 of the Local Government Code of 1991 (R.A. No. 7160), anyone seeking to become Governor of South Cotabato must meet the following qualifications:

- Be at least 21 years of age on election day
- Be a resident of South Cotabato for at least 1 year immediately preceding the day of election
- Be a Filipino citizen
- Be able to speak Filipino or any other local language or dialect

All Governors of South Cotabato, since 1986, are directly elected by registered voters in South Cotabato and serve for a term of three years. They take office on the 30th day of June following an election, which is also the date of expiry of the previous gubernatorial term.

=== Disqualifications ===
In accordance with Section 40 of the Code, any person seeking to become Governor is immediately disqualified for being:

- a dual citizen;
- removed from office as a result of an administrative case;
- a fugitive from justice in a criminal or non-political case in the Philippines or abroad;
- a permanent resident in a foreign country or those who have acquired the right to reside abroad and continue to avail of the same right;
- convicted by final judgement for violating the Oath of Allegiance to the Philippines;
- insane or feeble-minded; or
- sentenced by final judgement for an offense involving moral turpitude or for an offense punishable by 1 year or more of imprisonment, within 2 years after serving a criminal sentence.

=== Gubernatorial removal ===
There are several methods within the 1991 Code to remove a Governor.

==== Recall by the voters ====
The people of South Cotabato may, in accordance with Section 70 of the Code, initiate the recall of a Governor.

=== Resignation from office ===
A Governor may only resign from office in accordance with Section 82 of the Code. Governors intending to resign must submit such resignation to the President. Copies of resignation letters will be furnished by the DILG. If the President does act on such resignation after 15 days in accordance with Section 82(c), the resignation is deemed to have accepted.

However, governors are prohibited from resigning if they are subject to a recall vote in accordance with Section 73.

=== Limits of office ===
The President may suspend, discipline or remove the Governor if he or she is found to be:

- disloyal to the Republic;
- in violation of the Constitution;
- committing dishonesty, oppression, misconduct in office, gross negligience, or dereliction of duty;
- committing any offense involving moral turpitude or an offense punishable by at least prision mayor (a minimum of 6 years);
- abusing his or her authority;
- absent from his or her duties without permission for 15 consecutive working days;
- applying for, or acquiring, foreign citizenship or residence or the status of an immigrant of another country; or
- any other such grounds as may be provided by the Code and other laws.

A judicial court may remove the Governor if he or she is found to be guilty of any offense mentioned above.

== Provincial Governors (1967–present) ==
No.	Portrait	Name(Lifespan)	Party	Term	Election	Era
1		Sergio Morales (1908–1994)	Nacionalista	November 14, 1967 – May 2, 1986 (18 years, 169 days)	1967	Third Republic
1		Sergio Morales (1908–1994)	Nacionalista	November 14, 1967 – May 2, 1986 (18 years, 169 days)	1971	Third Republic
1		Sergio Morales (1908–1994)	KBL	November 14, 1967 – May 2, 1986 (18 years, 169 days)	1980	Martial Law
1		Sergio Morales (1908–1994)	KBL	November 14, 1967 – May 2, 1986 (18 years, 169 days)	1980	Fourth Republic
*OIC		Ismael Sueno (1947–)	PDP–Laban	May 2, 1986 – January 18, 1988 (1 year, 261 days)	—	Provisional Government
2		Ismael Sueno (1947–)	PDP–Laban	January 18, 1988 – June 30, 1992 (4 years, 133 days)	1988	Fifth Republic
3		Hilario de Pedro III (1950–2016)	NPC	June 30, 1992 – June 30, 2001 (9 years)	1992	Fifth Republic
3		Hilario de Pedro III (1950–2016)	NPC	June 30, 1992 – June 30, 2001 (9 years)	1995	Fifth Republic
3		Hilario de Pedro III (1950–2016)	NPC	June 30, 1992 – June 30, 2001 (9 years)	1998	Fifth Republic
4		Daisy P. Avance - Fuentes	NPC	June 30, 2001 – June 30, 2010 (9 years)	2001	Fifth Republic
4		Daisy P. Avance - Fuentes	NPC	June 30, 2001 – June 30, 2010 (9 years)	2004	Fifth Republic
4		Daisy P. Avance - Fuentes	NPC	June 30, 2001 – June 30, 2010 (9 years)	2007	Fifth Republic
5		Arthur Pingoy	Lakas–CMD	June 30, 2010 – June 30, 2013 (3 years)	2010	Fifth Republic
6		Daisy P. Avance - Fuentes	NPC	June 30, 2013 – June 30, 2019 (6 years)	2013	Fifth Republic
6		Daisy P. Avance - Fuentes	NPC	June 30, 2013 – June 30, 2019 (6 years)	2016	Fifth Republic
7		Reynaldo Tamayo Jr. (1980–)	PFP	June 30, 2019 – present (7 years, 69 days)	2019	Fifth Republic
7		Reynaldo Tamayo Jr. (1980–)	PFP	June 30, 2019 – present (7 years, 69 days)	2022	Fifth Republic
