= Eduardo Quintero (diplomat) =

Filipino diplomat

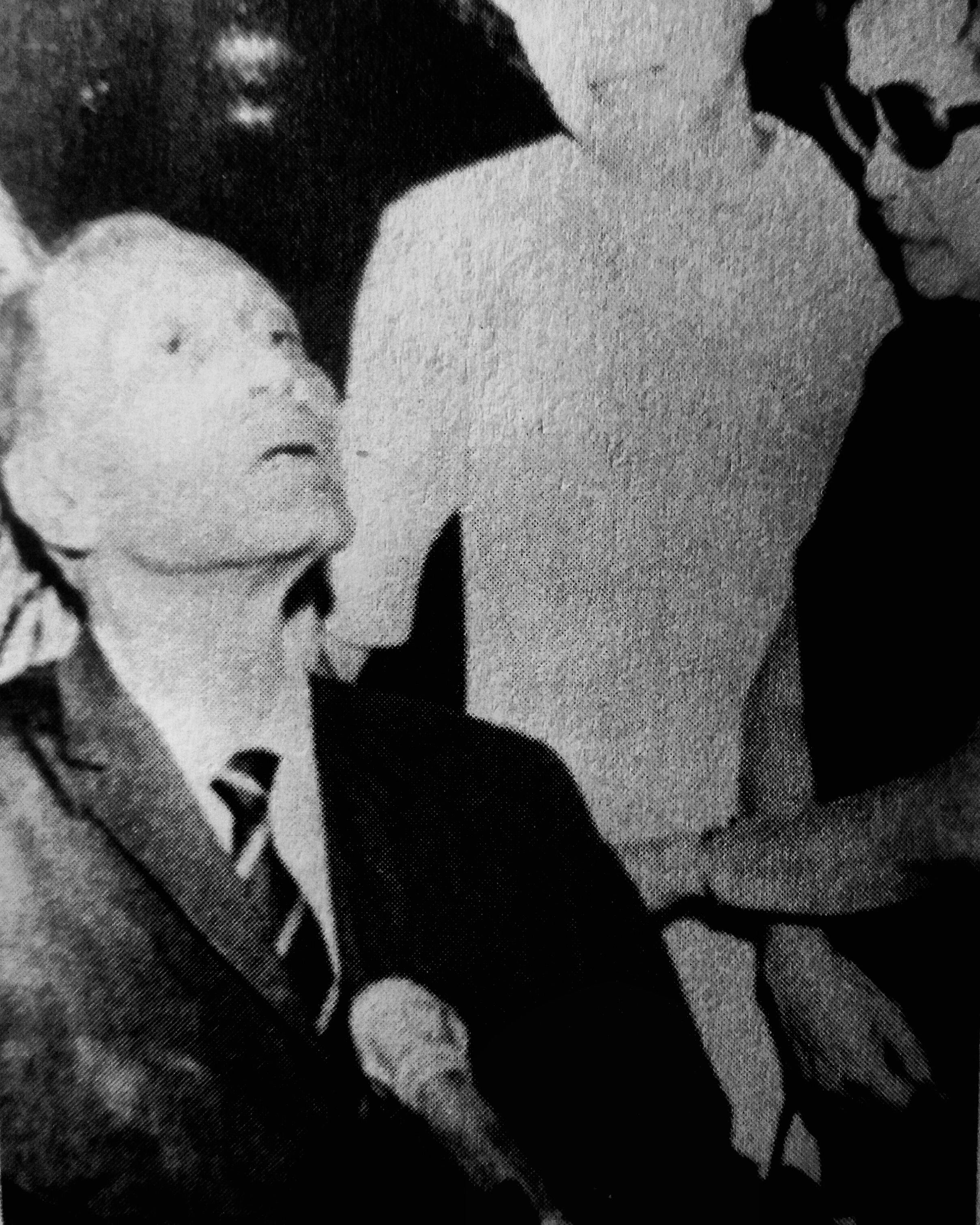
- Ailing whistleblower Eduardo Quintero testifying against Imelda Marcos et al at a hearing about the 1971 Constitutional Convention bribery scam
- Born: 29 May 1900; Tacloban, Leyte, Philippine Islands
- Died: 17 December 1984 (aged 84); San Francisco, California, U.S.
- Education: University of the Philippines Manila (LL.B.)
- Occupations: Diplomat, Constitutional Convention delegate
- Spouse: Tarcila Pariña
- Children: 3
- Awards: Honored at the Bantayog ng mga Bayani Wall of Remembrance

Eduardo Torcelo Quintero (29 May 1900 – 17 December 1984) was a Filipino lawyer and diplomat. He served as an ambassador to the United Nations, and an elected delegate to the Philippine Constitutional Convention of 1971 tasked with framing a new constitution for the country to replace the previous 1935 constitution. He is most notable for his role during the 1971 Constitutional Convention when he exposed a bribery scandal during the presidency of Ferdinand Marcos prior to his dictatorial rule.

== Early life ==
Quintero was born in Tacloban City of the province of Leyte in the Eastern Visayas region of the country. His parents were Eduardo Quintero Sr. and Baldomera Torcelo. He was married to Tarcila Pariña with whom he had 3 children. For his elementary and secondary education he attended the Leyte Intermediate School and Leyte High School respectively. For college he attended the University of the Philippines College of Law.

== Constitutional Convention exposé ==
His legacy is enshrined in what is known as the Quintero Exposé in which, on 19 May 1971, in a privilege speech on the plenary of the 1971 Philippine Constitutional Convention colloquially called "Con-Con", he disclosed that on different occasions, certain people that he did not name distributed money to delegates of the Con-Con, apparently in an effort to influence them in the discharge of their functions. Quintero himself claimed to have received money from this "money lobby" and would promptly give to the convention the payoff or "payola" money he was given amounting to P11,150 (a large sum of money at the time) for safe-keeping. The ailing whistleblower purposely left out any names in his speech and begged at the time not to be made to name names.

Due to mounting public pressure, Quintero would afterwards release a three-page sworn on 30 May revealing the names of the 14 people he claimed to be behind the bribery scheme. The statement was written from his hospital bed in San Juan de Dios Hospital where he was admitted for an undisclosed cause and was issued a day after he returned from Tacloban to attend the funeral of his brother.

Among the people accused in Quintero's statement was First Lady Imelda Marcos. This piece of information quickly fueled and reaffirmed allegations made by the public and members of the convention alike that the President was using the convention as a ploy to evade the term-limits set in the previous constitution enabling him to stay in power beyond the 8 years previously prescribed. Among debated proposals in the convention that would have drastically impacted the political career of the Marcoses and which may have sparked the bribery's orchestration in the first place were a discussed shift to a parliamentary system of government that would have enabled the President to run as Prime Minister unrestricted by term limits and a proposal filed as a continuation of a previous resolution that narrowly failed to be included in the convention's enabling law that would have called for the convention to adopt a provision barring Marcos or his wife from pursuing public office in the upcoming elections.

A day after the release of Quintero's statement, the President went on air as well as live TV to denounce the expose and Quintero. Later, Leyte congressman Artemio Mate whose wife was tagged by Quintero as a "principal" in the scandal along with the First Lady issued an affidavit claiming Quintero was a bribe-taker. Elias Asuncion, Judge of the Court of First Instance of Leyte and a province mate of Marcos from Ilocos Norte, issued a search warrant that enabled National Bureau of Investigation agents to raid Quintero's house in the Manila district of Sta. Ana. The NBI subsequently raided his house and alleged they found P379,320 in an unlocked cabinet. The implication being that Quintero received the money from the Marcos opposition in exchange for fabricating an expose. Months after the scandal, the President would place the entirety of the Philippines under Martial Law, beginning the country's era of dictatorship.

After his death, the Supreme Court of the Philippines vindicated Quintero when finally in 1988 it ruled that the NBI raid on his house was orchestrated "from beginning to end" to destroy him.

== Later life and death ==
In 1977, after being allowed to quietly return to his home province of Leyte, he left for the United States of America with his family. There he kept in touch with Filipinos who fled from the country after the declaration of Martial Law and wrote a book which was to be entitled "The Envelopes of Imelda Marcos." The manuscript was never published. He would later die at the age of 84 in San Francisco.

== Honors ==
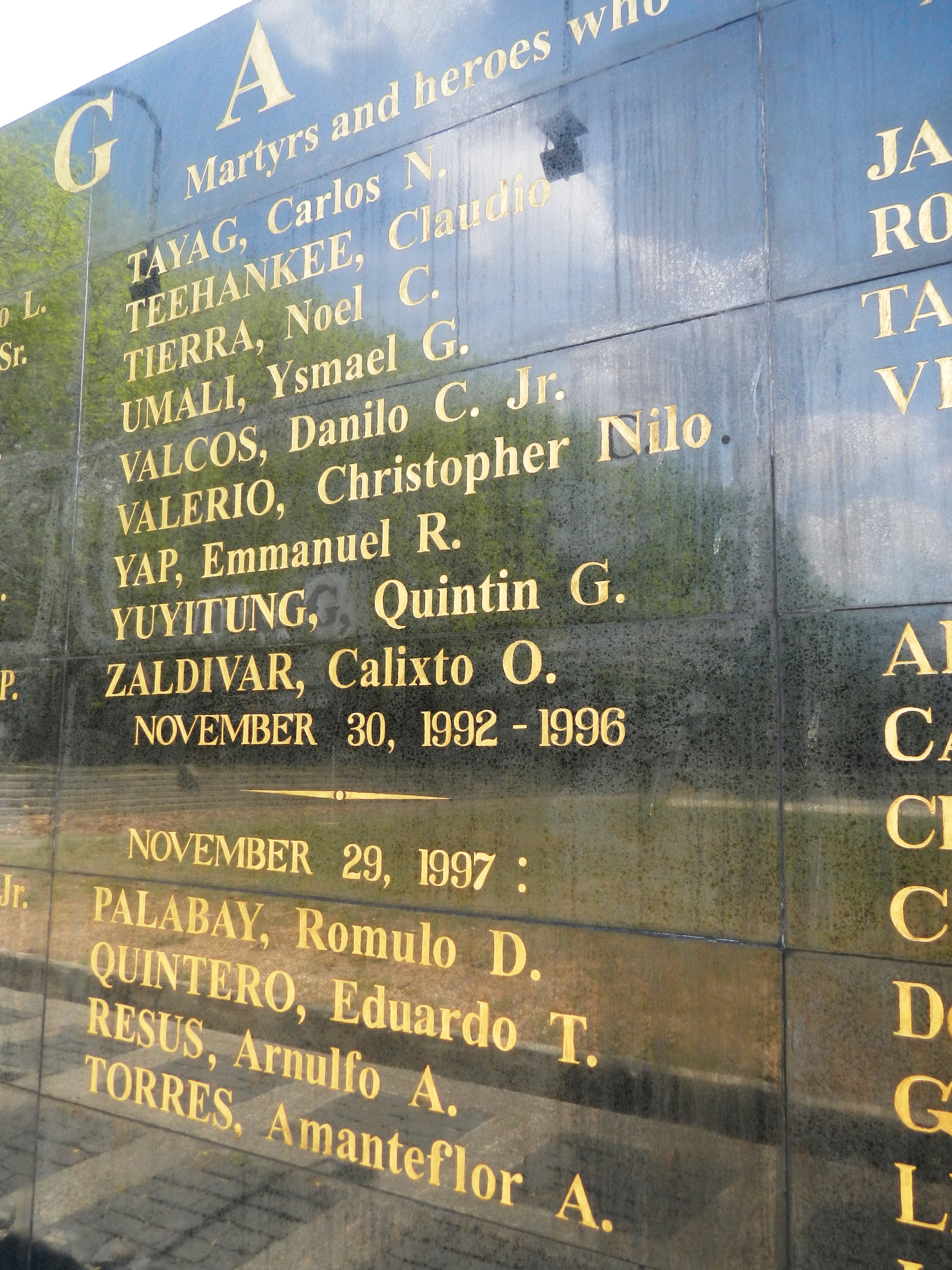
Detail of the Wall of Remembrance at the Bantayog ng mga Bayani, showing names from the 1997 batch of Bantayog Honorees, including that of Eduardo Quintero.

For his efforts in exposing corruption in the Constitutional Convention, Quintero is honored as one of the martyrs and heroes of Martial Law whose names are inscribed on the Wall of Remembrance at the Bantayog ng mga Bayani (lit. Monument of Heroes) in Quezon City. He was inducted in 1997.
