= Sedfrey Ordoñez =

Filipino politician and academic

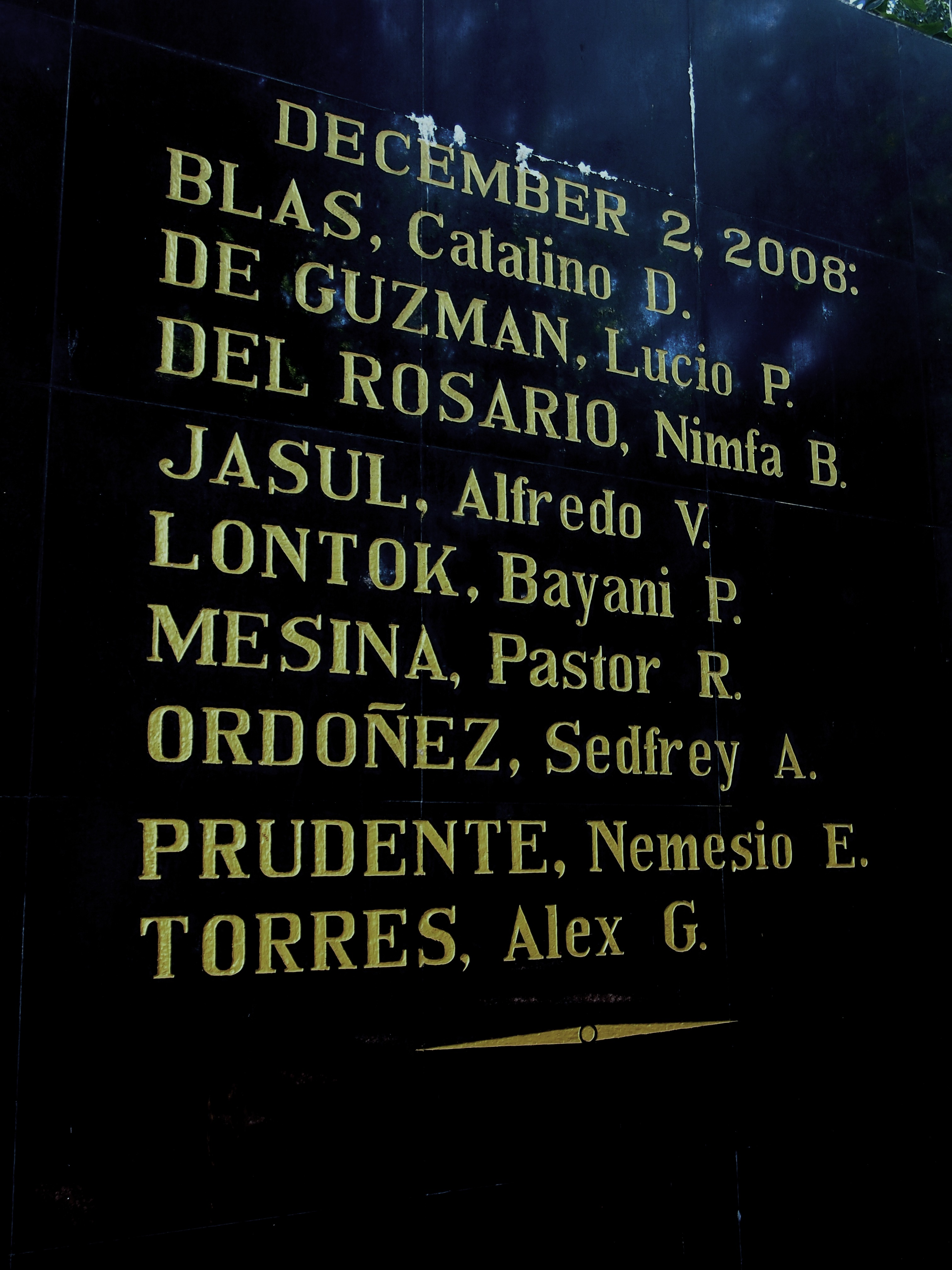
- Detail of the Wall of Remembrance at the Bantayog ng mga Bayani, showing names from the 2008 batch of Bantayog Honorees, including that of Sedfrey Ordoñez.

43rd Secretary of Justice
- In office March 9, 1987 – January 2, 1990
- President: Corazon Aquino
- Preceded by: Neptali Gonzales
- Succeeded by: Franklin Drilon

Personal details
- Born: Sedfrey Andres Ordoñez; September 1, 1921 Gapan, Nueva Ecija, Philippine Islands
- Died: November 18, 2007 (aged 86) Makati, Philippines
- Education: University of the Philippines Manila (BA); Manuel L. Quezon University (LL.B.); Philippine Law School (LL.M.)
- Occupation: Lawyer

Sedfrey Andres Ordoñez (September 1, 1921 – November 18, 2007) was a Filipino lawyer, government official, academic, linguist, and poet. He was the delegate of his home province of Nueva Ecija to the Philippine Constitutional Convention of 1971.

At different times within the term of President Corazon Aquino, Ordoñez served as solicitor general, secretary of justice, and later, as permanent representative and ambassador to the United Nations. During the term of President Fidel V. Ramos, he served as Chair of the Commission on Human Rights. He was also played key roles in numerous Philippine Non-governmental organizations including Bantay Katarungan, Bantayog ng mga Bayani, and Kilosbayan.

As a writer, he authored numerous works including poetry, plays, essays, and an autobiography titled 50 Years in Law and Letters.

His name is inscribed on the wall of the remembrance of the Bantayog ng mga Bayani, which honors the martyrs and heroes of the resistance against the Marcos dictatorship.

== Life and career ==
Ordoñez attended the College of Liberal Arts at the University of the Philippines from 1940 to 1941. He received his bachelor's degree in law, after World War II, in 1948, from Manuel L. Quezon University. He obtained his master's degree six years later from the Philippine Law School.

Ordoñez was a partner at the law firm Salonga, Ordoñez and Yap Law Office from 1953 to 1986. From 1950 to 1986 he also lectured at various universities. In 1970, Ordoñez was elected delegate to the Constitutional Convention on behalf of the 2nd Constituency of Nueva Ecija to draft the new Philippine Constitution, which eventually came into effect in 1972.

In 1986, Ordoñez was Solicitor General of the Philippines. The following year, he was appointed minister of justice in President Corazon Aquino's cabinet on March 13. He held this position until January 2, 1990. He was subsequently appointed ambassador of the Philippines to the United Nations.

After his two-year stint as ambassador, he served as chairman of the Commission on Human Rights in the Philippines from 1992 to 1995.

Ordoñez died on November 18, 2007, at the Makati Medical Center from a stroke.

For his role as a human rights lawyer defending victims of the Human rights abuses of the Marcos dictatorship, and for his broader opposition role during the period of Martial law under Ferdinand Marcos, Ordoñez was honored by having his name inscribed on the wall of the remembrance of the Bantayog ng mga Bayani, which honors the martyrs and heroes that resisted the authoritarian regime of Ferdinand Marcos.

== Sources ==
- Sedfrey Ordoñez, lawyer, poet, ambassador to UN, dies at 86, The Philippine Daily Inquirer (19 November 2007)
- Former justice chief Ordoñez dies, 86, GMA News online (19 November 2007)
