= Jesus Barrera =

Jesus G. Barrera
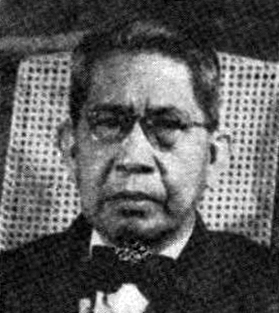

67th Associate Justice of the Supreme Court of the Philippines
- In office 1959–1966
- Appointed by: Carlos P. Garcia
- Preceded by: Guillermo Pablo
- Succeeded by: Franciso Capistrano

Secretary of Justice
- In office April 18, 1959 – June 4, 1959
- Preceded by: Pedro Tuason
- Succeeded by: Enrique Fernandez

Judge, Court of First Instanance, Manila and Batangas
- In office 1938–?

Personal details
- Born: Jesus Gonzalo Barrera y Alimurung; 18 December 1896 Concepcion, Tarlac, Captaincy General of the Philippines
- Died: August 28, 1988 (aged 91)
- Occupation: Lawyer
- Committees: Citizens Legal Assistance Committee, Civil Liberties Union

Jesus Gonzalo Barrera y Alimurung (December 18, 1896 – August 28, 1988) was a Filipino lawyer who served as the 67th Associate Justice of the Supreme Court of the Philippines from 1959 to 1966.

== Biography ==
He was born in Concepcion, Tarlac. His father, Marciano Barrera, served as the first appointive Governor of Tarlac province under the U.S. government. Barrera received his law degree from the University of the Philippines in 1921 and then entered private law practice. He later received a master of law degree from the University of Santo Tomas. He was first appointed a judge in 1938. During the Japanese occupation, he headed the Civil Liberties Union of the Philippines, an underground movement of prominent former officials who furnished military information to guerillas to be passed on to Gen. Douglas Macarthur in Australia. In the late 1940s Barrera was a key figure who attempted to convince President Manuel Roxas to negotiate a peace with the Huk guerillas who had rebelled because the United States and Philippine governments refused to recognize their wartime activities vs. the Japanese enemy.

== Career ==
In 1956, while serving as Undersecretary of the Department of Justice in the Philippines, Barrera stated that the situation with regard to U.S. military personnel off-base, where they were generally tried by Philippine authorities when accused of a crime was workable, but that the situation on the U.S. military bases where actions were not under Philippine criminal jurisdiction needed to change. He was the chair of the subcommittee negotiating the issue of jurisdiction during the 1956 U.S./Philippine talks trying to renegotiate the status of the U.S. military areas in the Philippines. Barrera was also the Secretary of Justice for the Philippines in 1958.

In 1971, Barrera was a member of the Philippines Constitutional Convention and a contender for the presidency of the convention. He was one of 19 convention delegates who refused to sign the Marcos-influenced 1972 Constitution that granted Marcos autocratic powers.
