= Lilia de Lima =

Filipino lawyer

Lilia Bagaporo de Lima is a lawyer from the Philippines and a recipient of the Ramon Magsaysay Award for work related to the Philippine Economic Zone Authority (PEZA).

== Biography ==
De Lima was born in Iriga, Camarines Sur, into a family of public servants, which includes Senator Leila de Lima. She was a delegate elected to the Philippine Constitutional Convention of 1971, representing Camarines Sur's 2nd district. She was trained in law and followed a career in government until 1995. She was then invited to serve as PEZA's first Director-General, responsible for promoting and regulating foreign investments in the country's economic zones, a post she held until 2016.

In 2006, de Lima was awarded the Order of the Rising Sun (2nd Class) by the Emperor of Japan for her work with PEZA.

In 2017, de Lima was awarded the Ramon Magsaysay Award, considered Asia's equivalent of the Nobel Prize.
