= Philippines Free Press =

English-language weekly magazine published in the Philippines

The Philippines Free Press was a weekly English language news magazine which was founded in 1908, which makes it the Philippines' oldest weekly English language periodical no longer in print. It is known for being one of the publications that was critical of the administration of Ferdinand Marcos in the years before the declaration of martial law, and for being one of the first publications shuttered once martial law was put into effect.

One of its short-lived sister publications was Pilipino magazine (subtitled "Ang Babasahin ng Bayan"), which was established in 1965.

Juan dela Cruz, the male national personification of the Philippines and counterpart to Maria dela Cruz, first appeared in this magazine in 1946.

Among the reporters of the magazine were Napoleon G. Rama, Jose F. "Pete" Lacaba, Nick Joaquin (under the alias Quijano de Manila), and Teodoro Locsin Sr.

The Philippines Free Press was revived after Marcos was ousted.

The magazine was known for featuring the outstanding legislators every year. Jose W. Diokno holds the title for four consecutive years, which is the most in the magazine's award-giving history.

It published its final issue in 2011.

== See also ==
- Journalism during the Marcos dictatorship
- Censorship in the Philippines: martial law period
