= Bren Guiao =

Filipino politician (1934–1997)

The Honorable Bren Guiao
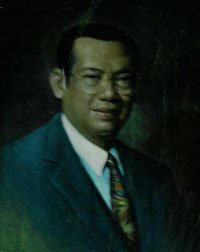
- Official portrait

29th Governor of Pampanga
- In office February 25, 1986 – June 30, 1995
- Vice Governor: Robin Nepomuceno (1986–1987); Cielo Macapagal-Salgado (1988–1992); Lito Lapid (1992–1995)
- Preceded by: Estelito Mendoza
- Succeeded by: Lito Lapid

Personal details
- Born: July 7, 1934 Magalang, Pampanga, Philippine Islands
- Died: April 17, 1997 (aged 62) Manila, Philippines
- Party: Lakas (1992–1997); LDP (1988–1992); UNIDO (1984–1988)
- Children: 2 (including Yeng)
- Occupation: Politician

Bren Zablan Guiao (July 7, 1934 – April 17, 1997) was a Filipino politician who served as Governor of Pampanga from 1986 to 1995. He also served as a delegate of 1971 Philippine Constitutional convention. He is the father of former Vice Governor and basketball coach Yeng Guiao.

In 1995, Guiao was defeated by actor Lito Lapid.
