= Reynaldo Tamayo Jr. =

Filipino politician (born 1980)

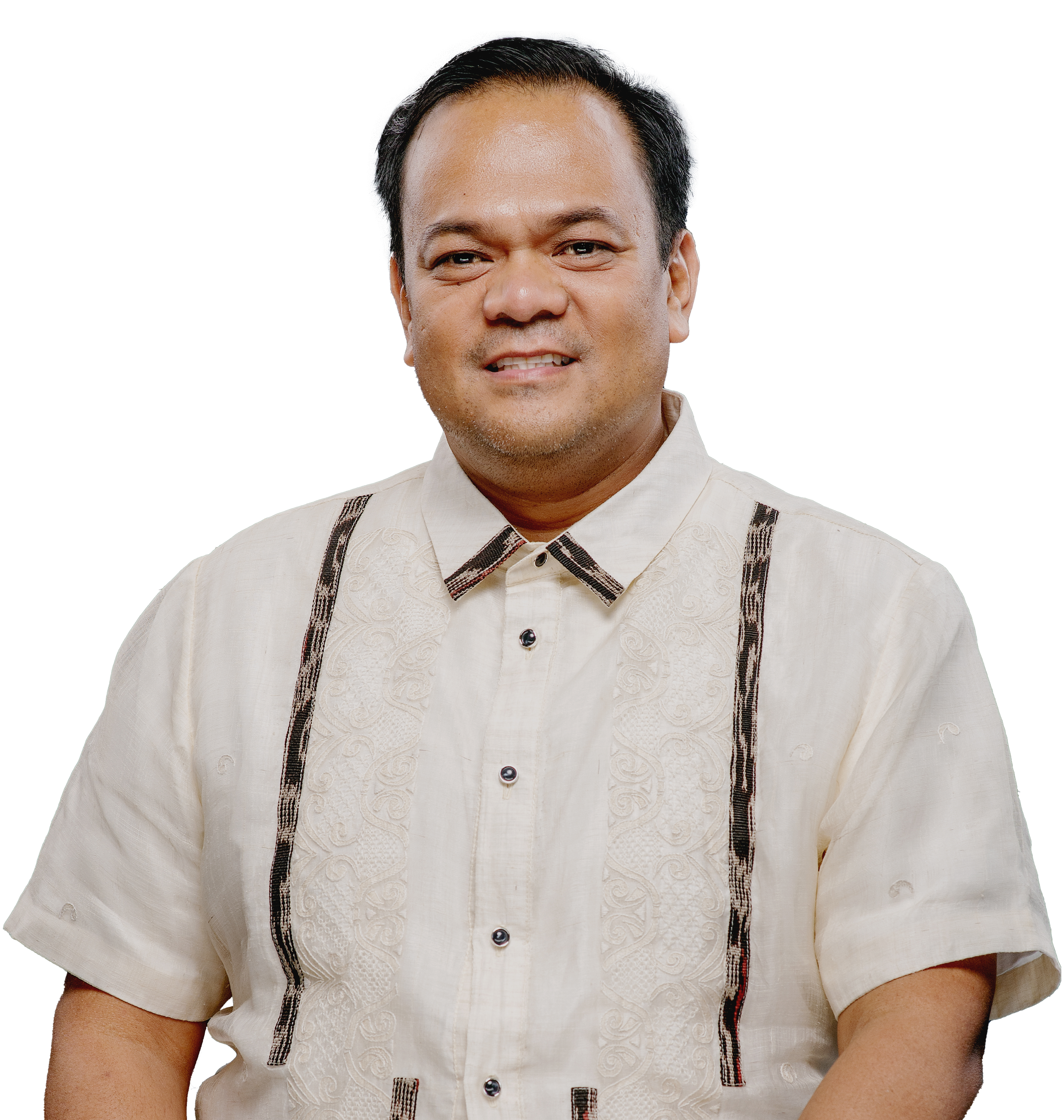
- Official Portrait

5th Governor of South Cotabato
- Incumbent
- Assumed office June 30, 2019
- Vice Governor: Vicente de Jesus (2019–2022); Arthur Pingoy Jr. (2022–present)
- Preceded by: Daisy Avance Fuentes

Mayor of Tupi, South Cotabato
- In office June 30, 2010 – June 30, 2019
- Preceded by: Valentin Mariano Jr.
- Succeeded by: Romeo Tamayo

Personal details
- Born: February 9, 1980 (age 46) Tupi, South Cotabato, Philippines
- Party: PFP (2018–present)
- Other political affiliations: Liberal (2009–2018)
- Spouse: Rochelle Petalco
- Parent: Reynaldo Sr. (father)
- Education: Notre Dame of Marbel University

Reynaldo Sucayan Tamayo Jr. (born February 9, 1980) is a Filipino politician serving as the governor of South Cotabato since 2019. He was previously mayor of Tupi from 2010 to 2019. He was born to Reynaldo Tamayo Sr., who became a congressman.

He has been the president of Partido Federal ng Pilipinas (PFP) since 2019.

== Electoral history ==
Electoral history of Reynaldo Tamayo Jr.
Year	Office	Party	Votes received				Result
Year	Office	Party	Total	%	P.	Swing	Result
2010	Mayor of Tupi, South Cotabato	Liberal	12,754	—N/a	1st	—N/a	Won
2013	Mayor of Tupi, South Cotabato	Liberal	17,382	—N/a	1st	—N/a	Won
2013	Mayor of Tupi, South Cotabato	Liberal	25,096	—N/a	1st	—N/a	Won
2019	Governor of South Cotabato	PFP	222,060	53.24%	1st	—N/a	Won
2022	Governor of South Cotabato	PFP	253,944	52.32%	1st	-0.92	Won
2025	Governor of South Cotabato	PFP	346,611	69.73%	1st	+17.41	Won
