= Maria Clara L. Lobregat Highway =

Maria Clara L. Lobregat Highway
- MCLL Highway
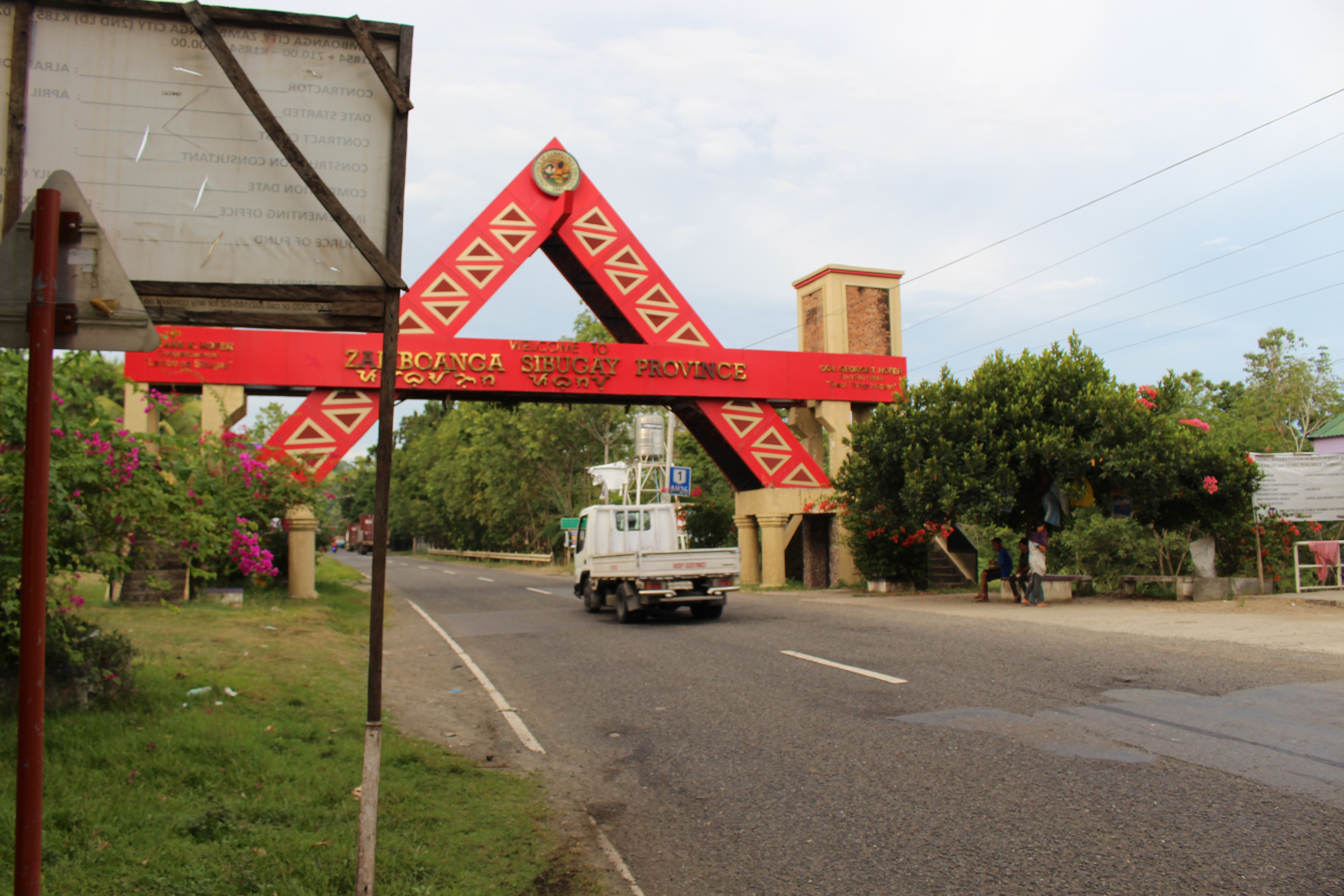
- The Zamboanga Sibugay–Zamboanga City boundary along the highway

Route information
- Part of AH26
- Maintained by the Department of Public Works and Highways
- Length: 85 km (53 mi)
- Component highways: AH 26 (N1)

Major junctions
- North end: AH 26 (N1) (Maharlika Highway)
- South end: AH 26 (N1) (Veterans Avenue) / N968 (Governor Camins Road) / Veterans Avenue Extension

Location
- Country: Philippines
- Major cities: Zamboanga City

Highway system
- Roads in the Philippines; Highways; Expressways; List

The Maria Clara Lorenzo Lobregat Highway (commonly known as MCLL Highway) is a two-to -four lane national highway running in the east coast part of Zamboanga City, Philippines from the city's boundary with Tungawan, Zamboanga Sibugay in Barangay Licomo to the intersection with Governor Camins Road and Veterans Avenue at the Sta. Cruz Intersection. Under Republic Act No. 9270 approved on March 19, 2004, the highway was named after the Maria Clara Lobregat, who was the city's first female mayor serving from 1998 until her death in January 2004.

The highway is also part of the Pan-Philippine Highway, particularly its section also known as Lanao-Pagadian-Zamboanga City Road and Pagadian City-Zamboanga City Road, and a designated component of National Route 1 (N1) the Philippine highway network.

== Incidents ==
- On July 29, 2008, some 100 meters (330 ft) of the portion of the highway in barangay Victoria located 28 kilometers (17 mi) from the city collapsed by 20 feet (6.1 m) due to torrential rains that liquefied the soil beneath the highway. There were no reports of accidents or injuries, but hundreds of commuters were stranded in Zamboanga City because provincial buses could not pass through.
