= Reynaldo Tamayo Sr. =

Filipino politician (1952–2025)

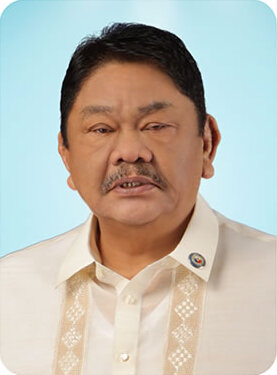
- Official House of Representatives portrait, 2022

Member of the Philippine House of Representatives for ANGAT Partylist
- In office June 30, 2022 – June 21, 2025

Personal details
- Born: Reynaldo Tamayo; November 17, 1952
- Died: June 21, 2025 (aged 72)
- Party: ANGAT
- Children: Reynaldo Jr.
- Occupation: Politician

Reynaldo S. Tamayo Sr. (November 17, 1952 – June 21, 2025) was a Filipino politician who was a member of the House of Representatives for ANGAT Partylist from 2022 until his death in 2025.

== Career ==
Tamayo was a long-time government official with at least 40 years of experience. He was accused in 2018 by Robert Catapang in his capacity as Department of Public Works and Highways Central Mindanao director as being part of a syndicate involved in a right of way scam. He denied the accusations. His son Reynaldo Jr. was elected as South Cotabato governor in 2019. The younger Tamayo hailed his win as a vindication against the allegations regarding his father.

In the 2022 election, the partylist ANGAT which focuses on agriculture won a seat. Tamayo Sr. filled the seat. He proposed bills to impose logging and mining bans in Cagayan de Oro, Tamayo also did not sign the petition involving the impeachment of Vice President Sara Duterte. Tamayo died in office on June 21, 2025 at age 72.

== Personal life and death ==
Tamayo came from a political family which is based in Tupi, South Cotabato. His brother Romeo was mayor of the town. The barangay of Juan-Loreto Tamayo in Tupi is named after their grandparents Juan and Loreto Tamayo, who was vice-mayor of Tupi. Reynaldo Jr. the son of Tamayo Sr. was elected governor of South Cotabato in 2019.

Tamayo died on June 21, 2025, at the age of 72.
