= Jose Nolledo =

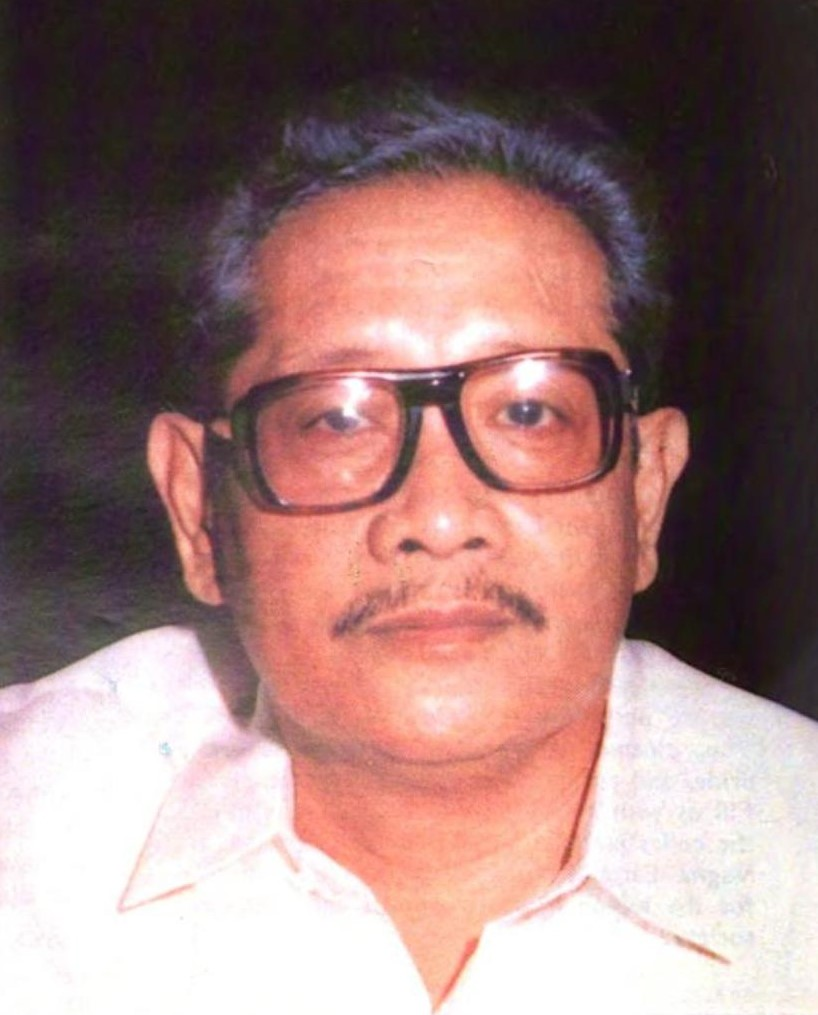
Nolledo from the Official Directory of the Constitutional Commission, c. 1986

Jose Nergua Nolledo (born October 11, 1934) is a lawyer, constitutional law expert, and author in the Philippines. He was a member of the Philippine Constitutional Commission of 1986 and a delegate to the 1971 Constitutional Convention.

== Early life and education ==
Nolledo was born in Inagawan, Puerto Princesa City, Palawan. His parents were Nicomedes Fillaro Nolledo and Presentacion Florencondia Nergua, both natives of Miagao, Iloilo.

He wrote poems in Filipino language at the age of nine. The poems were published in the Philippine Journal of Education edited by literary critic Paz Marquez Benitez, the Filipino Child Life edited by psychologist Dr. Eufronio Alip, and the Philippine School Life by educator Dr. Juliana Pineda. Some poems were included in Mga Tulang Pambata (Poems for Children), a reference book in Philippine grade schools.

Nolledo earned a Bachelor of Laws (LL.B.) degree from the Far Eastern University Institute of Law. He placed third in the 1958 Philippine Bar Examinations with a rating of 88.95%.

== Constitutional law expertise ==
Nolledo was elected as a delegate, representing the province of Palawan, in the 1971 Constitutional Convention which drafted the 1973 Philippine Constitution. He was one of the principal sponsors of the constitutional definition of national territory. The work of the convention was affected by the proclamation of martial law under President Ferdinand Marcos in September 1972, with Nolledo being arrested as one of the convention delegates in the opposition bloc.

After Marcos was ousted from power and went into exile, he was appointed as a member of the Philippine Constitutional Commission of 1986, the body tasked to draft the 1987 Philippine Constitution. He was elected Chairman of the Committee on Local Governments. In this capacity, he authored provisions on local autonomy which were incorporated in the Local Government Code of 1991, a law principally authored by former Philippine Senate President Aquilino Pimentel Jr.

== Organizational activities ==
Nolledo has been a National President of the Holy Name Society of the Philippines; and Vice President of the Philippine Constitution Association (Philconsa).

== Publications ==
Nolledo has reputedly written roughly one-hundred-sixty-eight (168) titles in law, and has claimed to be the only man in the world to have written more than a hundred law books.

He is presently the Chairman of the Editorial Staff of the National Book Store Incorporated (NBSI), the largest chain of bookstores in the Philippines.

== Awards ==
Nolledo has been cited as one of the Ten Most Outstanding Constitutional Convention Delegates in 1972. He was also voted as the Most Outstanding Student of the Year by the Far Eastern University in 1958; the Most Outstanding Holynamer by the Holy Name Society of the Philippines in 1963; and the Most Outstanding FEU Alumnus by the Far Eastern University Alumni Association in 1988. He topped the nominations for membership by the Board of Governors of the Philippine Constitution Association in 1971.

== Private life ==
Nolledo is married to Mercedita Villarosa Santiago, a certified public accountant and lawyer. She placed second in the 1965 Philippine Bar Examinations with a rating of 89.55%. The couple has three children.
