= Maria Clara Lobregat =

Filipina politician (1921–2004)

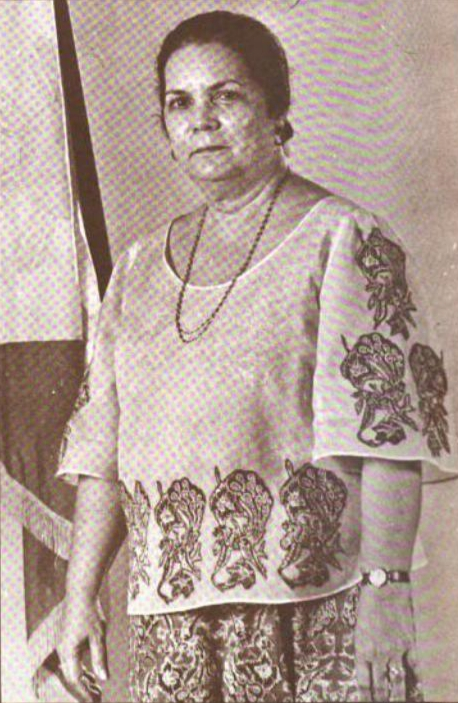
- Lobregat official portrait during the 8th Congress.

18th Mayor of Zamboanga City
- In office June 30, 1998 – January 2, 2004
- Vice Mayor: Roberto Ko (1998–2001); Erico Basilio Fabian (2001–2004)
- Preceded by: Vitaliano Agan
- Succeeded by: Erico Basilio Fabian

Member of the Philippine House of Representatives from Zamboanga City's Lone District
- In office June 30, 1987 – June 30, 1998
- Preceded by: Cesar Climaco (as Mambabatas Pambansa)
- Succeeded by: Celso Lobregat

Personal details
- Born: Maria Clara Lorenzo y Rafols; April 26, 1921 Zamboanga, Philippine Islands
- Died: January 2, 2004 (aged 82) Makati, Philippines
- Resting place: Manila Memorial Park – Sucat, Parañaque
- Party: LDP (1992-2004)
- Other political affiliations: Independent (1987-1992)
- Spouse(s): Celso "Tito" Lobregat, Sr. (m. 1945; died 1968)

María Clara Lorenzo de Lobregat (April 26, 1921 – January 2, 2004) was a Filipino politician who served as the 18th mayor of Zamboanga City from 1998 until her death in 2004, becoming the city's first female mayor. Prior to her mayoralty, she represented Zamboanga City's at-large district in the House of Representatives from 1987 to 1998.

== Early life ==
Lobregat or "Caling" was born April 26, 1921, in the then-municipality of Zamboanga, the second of five children of Pablo Lorenzo, who was the mayor of Zamboanga City from 1939 until 1940, a representative to the first Philippine Assembly, and a delegate to the Philippine Constitutional Convention, and Luisa Rafols of Cebu City. Lobregat grew up in the cities of Zamboanga, Cebu, and Manila. She spoke Zamboangueño Chavacano, Cebuano, English, Tagalog, and Spanish.

== Education ==
Lobregat was educated at Pilar College in Zamboanga City, Maryknoll and St. Scholastica's College in Manila and was the recipient of an honoris causa Doctor of Humanities from Ateneo de Davao University in 1979, Doctor in Business Administration from the Aquinas University in 1980, and Doctor in Educational Administration, Western Mindanao State University.

== Career ==
Lobregat was present in Malacañang Palace on October 12, 1936, when President Manuel L. Quezon created and established the chartered city of Zamboanga under the Philippine Commonwealth.

Before 1971, Lobregat, was president of the Philippine Coconut Producers Federation (COCOFED), and was subsequently elected to the 1971 Constitutional Convention representing Zamboanga City.

Throughout her political career, Lobregat lost in only one election – in 1984 for the lone seat at the Regular Batasang Pambansa. Allied with President Ferdinand Marcos, she lost to Mayor Cesar Climaco who did not assume his post as assemblyman.

Following Marcos' ouster in February 1986 and the then opposition-turned-administration splitting into factions, Lobregat easily won as representative of the Lone District of Zamboanga City in the 1987 legislative elections and was reelected in 1992 and 1995. She ran and won as mayor in 1998, was reelected in 2001 and was set to file her certificate of candidacy for a third term on January 5 in 2004 when she died. Her son Celso occupied the congressional seat she held from 1987 to 1998. Her nephew, Luis "Cito" Lorenzo Jr., was Agriculture Secretary under President Gloria Macapagal Arroyo from 2002 to 2004.

Lobregat's net worth at the end of 2002 was ₱27.8 million, making her the richest city mayor in Mindanao. In her Statement of Assets, Liabilities and Net Worth (SALN), Lobregat listed 18 companies where she had "shareholdings" and listed as number 19, "other enterprises (resort and others)" where she also had "shareholdings." Lobregat's business interests included banking, real estate, flower growing, mining, resort and resort development, recreation, petroleum, etc.

Lobregat, always seen in public wearing kimona and patadyong, figured prominently in the protest actions against the creation of the Southern Philippines Council for Peace and Development (SPCPD) in 1996. Along with fellow opponents, the then South Cotabato representatives Luwalhati Antonino and Daisy Fuentes, they were referred to by the media as "Tres Marías".

Lobregat was a harsh critic of Moro National Liberation Front chair Nur Misuari, insisted that the controversial coconut levy funds were private funds; campaigned against the inclusion of her city in the Autonomous Region in Muslim Mindanao in the 1989 and 2001 plebiscites; ordered Filipino deportees from Sabah, Malaysia in 2002 to be "screened" before entering the city; opposed the transfer of the seat of the Zamboanga Peninsula Region from Zamboanga City to Pagadian; and avidly supported the Balikatan joint military exercises between the Philippines and the United States.

== Personal life ==
Lobregat met her husband, Celso Lobregat, during volunteer work at Remedios Hospital at Malate, Manila. They wed on January 30, 1945, and had six children. Her husband was killed in a plane crash in May 1968. Her first son, Celso Lobregat, became representative of the former lone district of Zamboanga City in 1998, and later the Mayor of Zamboanga City in 2004 until 2013.

== Death and legacy ==
Lobregat died of cardiac arrest on January 2, 2004, at the Makati Medical Center. Her remains were first flown to Zamboanga Cathedral for her wake and funeral, before being transported back to Metro Manila for burial at Manila Memorial Park – Sucat in Parañaque. She was succeeded by Vice-Mayor Erico Basilio Fabian as Zamboanga City Mayor. Her son, Celso L. Lobregat was elected City Mayor in the 2004 local elections.

In 2004, a portion of the Pan-Philippine Highway (National Route 1), particularly the sections known as Lanao-Pagadian-Zamboanga City Road and Pagadian City-Zamboanga City Road, was named as the Maria Clara L. Lobregat Highway in her memory through Republic Act No. 9250. The same year, through City Ordinance No. 264, the Butterfly Garden at Pasonanca Park was named Jardin Maria Clara L. Lobregat.
