= 1992 Philippine House of Representatives elections =

16th Philippine House of Representatives elections

- May 11, 1992
- 200 (of the 216) seats in the House of Representatives of the Philippines; 101 seats needed for a majority
Party	Vote %	Seats	+/–
LDP	33.73	86	+86
Lakas	21.20	41	+41
NPC	18.66	30	+30
LP–PDP	8.82	11	+11
Nacionalista	3.92	7	+3
KBL	2.35	3	−8
Coalitions/others	6.28	16	−39
Independent	5.04	6	−17
This lists parties that won seats. See the complete results below.
Speaker before	Speaker after
Ramon Mitra Jr. LDP	Jose de Venecia Jr. Lakas

Elections for the House of Representatives of the Philippines were held on May 11, 1992. Held on the same day as the presidential election since incumbent president Corazon Aquino did not contest the election, the Laban ng Demokratikong Pilipino (LDP) served as the de facto administration party; just as all House of Representative elections, the perceived party of the president won majority of the seats in the House of Representatives. However, Fidel V. Ramos of Lakas–NUCD won the presidential election; this caused most of the newly elected congressmen to abandon the LDP for Lakas.

The elected representatives served in the 9th Congress from 1992 to 1995.

== Electoral system ==
The House of Representatives shall have not more than 250 members, unless otherwise fixed by law, of which 20% shall be elected via the party-list system, while the rest are elected via congressional districts. In lieu of an enabling law in regards to the party-list system, sectoral representatives shall continued to be appointed by the president just like previously in the Batasang Pambansa for the first three congresses from the enactment of the constitution, which includes this congress.

In this election, there are 200 seats voted via first-past-the-post in single-member districts. Each province, and a city with a population of 250,000, is guaranteed a seat, with more populous provinces and cities divided into two or more districts.

Congress has the power of redistricting three years after each census.

== Redistricting ==
Congress passed no redistricting bills for this election.

== Retiring incumbents ==
1. Agusan del Sur: Democrito Plaza (LDP), ran for governor of Agusan del Sur
2. Basilan: Alvin Dans (Koalisyong Pambansa), ran for governor of Basilan
3. Bataan–2nd: Tet Garcia (NPC), ran for governor of Bataan
4. Batangas–4th: Jose Calingasan (Lakas)
5. Bohol–2nd: David Tirol (NPC), ran for governor of Bohol
6. Bulacan–2nd: Vicente Rivera Jr. (NPC), ran for the senator
7. Cagayan de Oro: Benedicta Roa (LDP)
8. Caloocan–2nd: Gerardo P. Cabochan (Koalisyong Pambansa)
9. Camarines Sur–2nd: Raul Roco (LDP), ran for the senator
10. Camarines Sur–3rd: Eduardo Pilapil (Lakas), ran for the senator
11. Capiz–2nd: Cornelio Villareal (Koalisyong Pambansa)
12. Cavite–1st: Leonardo Guerrero (LDP)
13. Cavite–3rd: Jorge Nuñez (LDP)
14. Cebu–6th: Vicente dela Serna (LDP), ran for governor of Cebu
15. Cotabato–1st: Rodrigo Gutang (LDP), ran for the senator
16. Davao City–1st: Prospero Nograles (LDP), ran for mayor of Davao City
17. Davao del Norte–1st: Lorenzo Sarmiento (LDP)
18. Ilocos Norte–2nd: Mariano Nalupta Jr. (Independent), ran for vice governor of Ilocos Norte
19. Ilocos Sur–1st: Chavit Singson (LDP), ran for governor of Ilocos Sur
20. Iloilo–4th: Narciso Monfort (LDP), ran for the senator
21. Isabela–2nd: Simplicio Domingo Jr. (Lakas/LDP/NPC), ran for member of the Isabela Provincial Board
22. Laguna–1st: Nereo Joaquin (NPC), ran for governor of Laguna
23. Las Piñas–Muntinlupa: Filemon Aguilar (Independent)
24. Makati: Maria Consuelo Puyat-Reyes (LDP)
25. Manila–6th: Pablo Ocampo (NPC)
26. Marikina: Democlito Angeles (Koalisyong Pambansa)
27. Negros Occidental–1st: Salvador Laguda (LDP), ran for vice governor of Negros Occidental
28. Nueva Ecija–1st: Eduardo Nonato Joson (Balane)
29. Nueva Vizcaya: Carlos Padilla (LDP), ran for the senator
30. Oriental Mindoro–1st: Rodolfo Valencia (Koalisyong Pambansa), ran for governor of Oriental Mindoro
31. Palawan–2nd: Ramon Mitra Jr. (LDP), ran for president of the Philippines
32. Pangasinan–5th: Conrado Estrella Jr. (NPC/Nacionalista/KBL), ran for governor of Pangasinan
33. Parañaque: Freddie Webb (LDP), ran for the senator
34. Pasay: Lorna Verano Yap (Koalisyong Pambansa), ran for the senator
35. Quezon City–3rd: Nikki Coseteng (NPC), ran for the senator
36. Quezon City–4th: Mel Mathay (LDP), ran for mayor of Quezon City
37. Quezon–3rd: Bienvenido Marquez Jr. (NPC), ran for governor of Quezon
38. Quezon–4th: Oscar Santos (Koalisyong Pambansa), ran for governor of Quezon
39. Rizal–1st: Francisco Sumulong (Lakas), ran for the senator
40. South Cotabato–1st: Adelbert Antonino (LDP)
41. South Cotabato–2nd: Hilario de Pedro III (LDP), ran for governor of South Cotabato
42. Sulu–1st: Abdusakur Mahail Tan (Lakas), ran for governor of Sulu
43. Surigao del Norte–2nd: Constantino Navarro (KBL)
44. Zamboanga del Sur–1st: Isidoro Real Jr. (Lakas), ran for governor of Zamboanga del Sur

== Vacancies ==
1. Albay–3rd: Elfren Sarte (Liberal) died on July 22, 1988.
2. Batanes: Florencio Abad (Liberal) resigned upon being appointed as secretary of Agrarian Reform on December 12, 1989.
3. Bulacan–4th: Rogaciano Mercado (LDP) died on November 13, 1989.
4. Cagayan–3rd: Tito Dupaya (LDP) died on April 1, 1989.
5. Catanduanes: Moises Tapia (Independent) died on November 15, 1987.
6. Davao City–3rd: Luis Santos (Lakas ng Bansa) resigned on October 27, 1987, upon being appointed as secretary of Local Government.
7. Lanao del Norte–2nd: Abdullah Dimaporo (Nacionalista) resigned on December 12, 1989, to run for governor of the Autonomous Region in Muslim Mindanao.
8. Lanao del Sur–1st: Omar Dianalan (PDP–Laban) died on April 30, 1990.
9. Masbate–3rd: Moises Espinosa (Independent) was assassinated on March 17, 1989.
10. Nueva Ecija–4th: Nicanor de Guzman Jr. (LDP) resigned on August 7, 1990.
11. Pangasinan–1st: Oscar Orbos of (LDP) resigned on January 1, 1990, upon being appointed as secretary of Transportation and Communications.
12. Quezon–2nd: Mario Tagarao (LDP) died on April 23, 1990.

== Results ==
Party	Votes	%	+/–	Seats	+/–
Laban ng Demokratikong Pilipino	6,286,922	33.73	New	86	New
Lakas–NUCD	3,951,144	21.20	New	41	New
Nationalist People's Coalition	3,478,780	18.66	New	30	New
Koalisyong Pambansa	1,644,568	8.82	New	11	New
Nacionalista Party	730,696	3.92	−3.27	7	+3
Kilusang Bagong Lipunan	438,577	2.35	−1.75	3	−8
Coalitions	679,411	3.64	New	14	New
Others	491,970	2.64	New	2	New
Independent	938,558	5.04	−8.21	6	−17
Appointed seats				16	0
Total	18,640,626	100.00	–	216	+2
Source: Nohlen, Grotz and Hartmann and Teehankee

Vote share
LDP	33.73%
Lakas	21.20%
NPC	18.66%
LP-PDP	8.82%
Others	17.59%

District seats
LDP	43.00%
Lakas	20.50%
NPC	15.00%
LP-PDP	5.50%
Others	16.00%

=== Summary by district ===
Congressional district	Incumbent	Incumbent's party	Winner	Winner's party
Abra	Rudolfo Bernardez	NPC	Jeremias Zapata	Lakas
Agusan del Norte–1st	Charito Plaza	LDP	Charito Plaza	LDP
Agusan del Norte–2nd	Edelmiro Amante	Lakas	Edelmiro Amante	Lakas
Agusan del Sur	Democrito Plaza	LDP	Ceferino Paredes Jr.	NPC/Pagtinabangay
Aklan	Ramon Legaspi	NPC	Allen Quimpo	LDP
Albay–1st	Edcel Lagman	LDP	Edcel Lagman	LDP
Albay–2nd	Carlos R. Imperial	NPC	Carlos R. Imperial	NPC
Albay–3rd	Vacant		Al Francis Bichara	NPC
Antique	Exequiel Javier	Lakas	Exequiel Javier	Lakas
Aurora	Benedicto Miran	LDP	Benedicto Miran	LDP
Bacolod	Romeo Guanzon	LDP	Romeo Guanzon	LDP
Baguio	Honorato Aquino	LDP	Bernardo Vergara	NPC
Basilan	Alvin Dans	LP–PDP	Elnorita Tugung	Lakas
Bataan–1st	Felicito Payumo	LP–PDP	Felicito Payumo	LP–PDP
Bataan–2nd	Tet Garcia	NPC	Dominador Venegas	NPC
Batanes	Vacant		Enrique Lizardo	LDP
Batangas–1st	Conrado Apacible	LDP	Eduardo Ermita	Lakas
Batangas–2nd	Hernando Perez	LDP	Hernando Perez	LDP
Batangas–3rd	Milagros Trinidad	Nacionalista	Milagros Trinidad	Nacionalista
Batangas–4th	Jose Calingasan	Lakas	Ralph Recto	Nacionalista
Benguet	Samuel Dangwa	LDP	Samuel Dangwa	LDP
Bohol–1st	Venice Agana	Lakas	Venice Agana	Lakas
Bohol–2nd	David Tirol	NPC	Erico Aumentado	Nacionalista/NPC
Bohol–3rd	Isidro Zarraga	LDP	Isidro Zarraga	LDP
Bukidnon–1st	Socorro Acosta	LP–PDP	Socorro Acosta	LP–PDP
Bukidnon–2nd	Violeta Labaria	LDP	Reginaldo Tilanduca	NPC
Bukidnon–3rd	Jose Maria Zubiri Jr.	NPC	Jose Maria Zubiri Jr.	NPC
Bulacan–1st	Francisco Aniag Jr.	LDP	Teodulo Natividad	Lakas
Bulacan–2nd	Vicente Rivera Jr.	NPC	Pedro Pancho	NPC
Bulacan–3rd	Jose Cabochan	Lakas	Ricardo Silverio	LDP
Bulacan–4th	Vacant		Angelito Sarmiento	Lakas
Cagayan–1st	Domingo Tuzon	Lakas	Juan Ponce Enrile	Nacionalista
Cagayan–2nd	Leoncio Puzon	LDP	Edgar Lara	NPC
Cagayan–3rd	Vacant		Francisco Mamba	Lakas
Cagayan de Oro	Benedicta Roa	LDP	Erasmo Damasing	LP–PDP
Caloocan–1st	Romeo Santos	LDP	Aurora Henson	Liping Kalookan/Independent
Caloocan–2nd	Gerardo P. Cabochan	LP–PDP	Luis Asistio	Independent
Camarines Norte	Renato Unico	LDP	Emmanuel Pimentel	NPC
Camarines Sur–1st	Rolando Andaya	Lakas	Rolando Andaya	Lakas
Camarines Sur–2nd	Raul Roco	LDP	Celso Baguio	PMP
Camarines Sur–3rd	Eduardo Pilapil	Lakas	Arnulfo Fuentebella	Nacionalista/NPC
Camarines Sur–4th	Ciriaco Alfelor	LP–PDP	Ciriaco Alfelor	LP–PDP
Camiguin	Pedro Romualdo	LDP	Pedro Romualdo	LDP
Capiz–1st	Gerardo Roxas Jr.	LP–PDP/Lakas/Nacionalista	Gerardo Roxas Jr.	Koalisyong Pambansa/Lakas/Nacionalista
Capiz–2nd	Cornelio Villareal	LP–PDP	Vicente Andaya Jr.	Lakas/Koalisyong Pambansa
Catanduanes	Vacant		Leandro Verceles Jr.	Lakas
Cavite–1st	Leonardo Guerrero	LDP	Dominador Nazareno Jr.	NPC
Cavite–2nd	Renato Dragon	LDP/Magdalo	Renato Dragon	LDP/Magdalo
Cavite–3rd	Jorge Nuñez	LDP	Telesforo Unas	LDP/Magdalo
Cebu–1st	Antonio Bacaltos	Lakas	Eduardo Gullas	NPC
Cebu–2nd	Crisologo Abines	LDP	Crisologo Abines	LDP
Cebu–3rd	Pablo P. Garcia	Lakas	Pablo P. Garcia	Lakas
Cebu–4th	Celestino Martinez Jr.	LDP	Celestino Martinez Jr.	LDP
Cebu–5th	Ramon Durano III	LDP	Ramon Durano III	LDP
Cebu–6th	Vicente dela Serna	LDP	Nerissa Soon-Ruiz	NPC
Cebu City–1st	Raul del Mar	Panaghiusa	Raul del Mar	Panaghiusa
Cebu City–2nd	Antonio Cuenco	LDP	Antonio Cuenco	LDP
Cotabato–1st	Rodrigo Gutang	LDP	Anthony Dequiña	NPC/Nacionalista/GAD
Cotabato–2nd	Gregorio Andolana	LDP	Gregorio Andolana	LDP
Davao City–1st	Prospero Nograles	LDP	Jesus Dureza	NPC
Davao City–2nd	Cornelio Maskariño	LP–PDP	Manuel Garcia	NPC
Davao City–3rd	Vacant		Elias Lopez	NPC
Davao del Norte–1st	Lorenzo Sarmiento	LDP	Rogelio Sarmiento	LDP
Davao del Norte–2nd	Baltazar Sator	LDP	Baltazar Sator	LDP
Davao del Norte–3rd	Rodolfo del Rosario	LDP	Rodolfo del Rosario	LDP
Davao del Sur–1st	Juanito Camasura Jr.	NPC	Alejandro Almendras	Lakas
Davao del Sur–2nd	Benjamin Bautista Sr.	NPC/Nacionalista/KBL	Benjamin Bautista Sr.	NPC/Nacionalista/KBL
Davao Oriental–1st	Enrico Dayanghirang	LP–PDP	Maria Elena Palma-Gil	LDP
Davao Oriental–2nd	Thelma Almario	LDP	Thelma Almario	LDP
Eastern Samar	Jose Ramirez	Lakas	Jose Ramirez	Lakas
Ifugao	Gualberto Lumauig	Lakas	Benjamin Cappleman	LDP
Ilocos Norte–1st	Roque Ablan Jr.	KBL	Roque Ablan Jr.	KBL
Ilocos Norte–2nd	Mariano Nalupta Jr.	Independent	Bongbong Marcos	KBL
Ilocos Sur–1st	Chavit Singson	LDP	Mariano Tajon	LDP
Ilocos Sur–2nd	Eric Singson	LDP	Eric Singson	LDP
Iloilo–1st	Oscar Garin	Lakas	Oscar Garin	Lakas
Iloilo–2nd	Alberto Lopez	Lakas	Alberto Lopez	Lakas
Iloilo–3rd	Licurgo Tirador	Lakas	Licurgo Tirador	Lakas
Iloilo–4th	Narciso Monfort	LDP	Nicetas Panes	LDP
Iloilo–5th	Niel Tupas Sr.	LP–PDP	Niel Tupas Sr.	LP–PDP
Iloilo City	Rafael Lopez Vito	Lakas	Rafael Lopez Vito	Lakas
Isabela–1st	Rodolfo Albano Jr.	NPC	Rodolfo Albano Jr.	NPC
Isabela–2nd	Simplicio Domingo Jr.	Lakas/LDP/NPC	Faustino Dy Jr.	Lakas/LDP/NPC
Isabela–3rd	Santiago Respicio	Lakas/LDP/NPC	Santiago Respicio	Lakas/LDP/NPC
Isabela–4th	Antonio Abaya	NPC/KBL/Nacionalista	Antonio Abaya	NPC/KBL/Nacionalista
Kalinga-Apayao	William Claver	Lakas	Elias Bulut	LDP
La Union–1st	Victor Ortega	NPC	Victor Ortega	NPC
La Union–2nd	Jose Aspiras	NPC	Jose Aspiras	NPC
Laguna–1st	Nereo Joaquin	NPC	Roy Almoro	LDP
Laguna–2nd	Jun Chipeco	NPC	Rodolfo Tingzon	LDP
Laguna–3rd	Florante Aquino	LDP	Florante Aquino	LDP
Laguna–4th	Magdaleno Palacol Sr.	LDP	Magdaleno Palacol Sr.	LDP
Lanao del Norte–1st	Mariano Badelles	LDP	Mariano Badelles	LDP
Lanao del Norte–2nd	Vacant		Macabangkit Lanto	Lakas
Lanao del Sur–1st	Vacant		Mamintal Adiong Sr.	Lakas
Lanao del Sur–2nd	Mohammad Ali Dimaporo	KBL	Mohammad Ali Dimaporo	KBL
Las Piñas–Muntinlupa	Filemon Aguilar	Independent	Manny Villar	Independent
Leyte–1st	Cirilo Roy Montejo	LDP	Cirilo Roy Montejo	LDP
Leyte–2nd	Manuel Horca Jr.	LDP	Sergio Apostol	KBL
Leyte–3rd	Alberto Veloso	LDP	Alberto Veloso	LDP
Leyte–4th	Carmelo Locsin	Lakas	Carmelo Locsin	Lakas
Leyte–5th	Eriberto Loreto	LDP	Eriberto Loreto	LDP
Maguindanao–1st	Michael Mastura	LDP	Michael Mastura	LDP
Maguindanao–2nd	Guimid Matalam	Lakas/UMDP	Simeon Datumanong	LDP/Nacionalista
Makati	Maria Consuelo Puyat-Reyes	LDP	Joker Arroyo	Independent
Malabon–Navotas	Tessie Aquino-Oreta	LDP	Tessie Aquino-Oreta	LDP
Manila–1st	Martin Isidro	LDP	Martin Isidro	LDP
Manila–2nd	Jaime Lopez	Lakas	Jaime Lopez	Lakas
Manila–3rd	Leonardo Fugoso	LP–PDP	Leonardo Fugoso	LP–PDP
Manila–4th	Ramon Bagatsing Jr.	LDP	Ramon Bagatsing Jr.	LDP
Manila–5th	Amado Bagatsing	LDP	Amado Bagatsing	LDP
Manila–6th	Pablo Ocampo	NPC	Rosenda Ann Ocampo	NPC
Marikina	Democlito Angeles	LP–PDP	Romeo Candazo	LDP
Marinduque	Carmencita Reyes	LDP	Carmencita Reyes	LDP
Masbate–1st	Tito Espinosa	LDP	Tito Espinosa	LDP
Masbate–2nd	Luz Cleta Bakunawa	LDP	Luz Cleta Bakunawa	LDP
Masbate–3rd	Vacant		Antonio Kho	Lakas
Misamis Occidental–1st	Julio Ozamiz	LDP	Percival Catane	NPC
Misamis Occidental–2nd	Hilarion Ramiro Jr.	Lakas	Hilarion Ramiro Jr.	Lakas
Misamis Oriental–1st	Isacio Pelaez	LP–PDP	Homobono Cesar	LDP
Misamis Oriental–2nd	Victorico Chaves	LDP	Victorico Chaves	LDP
Mountain Province	Victor Dominguez	Lakas	Victor Dominguez	Lakas
Negros Occidental–1st	Salvador Laguda	LDP	Tranquilino Carmona	NPC
Negros Occidental–2nd	Manuel Puey	LP–PDP	Manuel Puey	LP–PDP
Negros Occidental–3rd	Jose Carlos Lacson	LDP	Jose Carlos Lacson	LDP
Negros Occidental–4th	Edward Matti	NPC	Edward Matti	NPC
Negros Occidental–5th	Mariano Yulo	NPC	Mariano Yulo	NPC
Negros Occidental–6th	Hortensia Starke	Lakas	Hortensia Starke	Lakas
Negros Oriental–1st	Jerome Paras	Lakas	Jerome Paras	Lakas
Negros Oriental–2nd	Miguel Romero	LDP	Miguel Romero	LDP
Negros Oriental–3rd	Margarito Teves	LDP	Margarito Teves	LDP
Northern Samar–1st	Raul Daza	LP–PDP	Raul Daza	LP–PDP
Northern Samar–2nd	Jose Ong Jr.	Lakas	Wilmar Lucero	LP–PDP
Nueva Ecija–1st	Eduardo Nonato Joson	BALANE	Renato Diaz	Lakas
Nueva Ecija–2nd	Simeon Garcia Jr.	LDP	Eleuterio Violago	NPC/BALANE
Nueva Ecija–3rd	Hermogenes Concepcion Jr.	LDP	Pacifico Fajardo	NPC/BALANE
Nueva Ecija–4th	Vacant		Victorio Lorenzo	LDP
Nueva Vizcaya	Carlos Padilla	LDP	Leonardo B. Perez	NPC
Occidental Mindoro	Mario Gene Mendiola	NPC	Jose T. Villarosa	LDP
Oriental Mindoro–1st	Rodolfo Valencia	LP–PDP	Renato Leviste	Nacionalista
Oriental Mindoro–2nd	Jesus Punzalan	LDP	Jesus Punzalan	LDP
Palawan–1st	David Ponce de Leon	LDP	David Ponce de Leon	LDP
Palawan–2nd	Ramon Mitra Jr.	LDP	Alfredo Amor Abueg Jr.	LDP
Pampanga–1st	Carmelo Lazatin Sr.	LDP	Carmelo Lazatin Sr.	LDP
Pampanga–2nd	Emigdio Lingad	LDP	Emigdio Lingad	LDP
Pampanga–3rd	Oscar Samson Rodriguez	LDP	Andrea Domingo	Lakas
Pampanga–4th	Emigdio Bondoc	Nacionalista	Emigdio Bondoc	Nacionalista
Pangasinan–1st	Vacant		Oscar Orbos	Independent
Pangasinan–2nd	Antonio Bengson III	LDP	Chris Mendoza	Lakas
Pangasinan–3rd	Fabian Sison	LDP	Eric Galo Acuña	NPC/KBL
Pangasinan–4th	Jose de Venecia Jr.	Lakas	Jose de Venecia Jr.	Lakas
Pangasinan–5th	Conrado Estrella Jr.	NPC/Nacionalista/KBL	Amadeo Perez Jr.	LDP
Pangasinan–6th	Conrado Estrella III	NPC/KBL/GAD	Conrado Estrella III	NPC/KBL/GAD
Parañaque	Freddie Webb	LDP	Roilo Golez	LDP
Pasay	Lorna Verano Yap	LP–PDP	Jovito Claudio	LDP
Pasig	Rufino Javier	NPC	Rufino Javier	NPC
Quezon–1st	Wilfrido Enverga	LDP	Wilfrido Enverga	LDP
Quezon–2nd	Vacant		Marcial Punzalan Jr.	LDP
Quezon–3rd	Bienvenido Marquez Jr.	NPC	Danilo Suarez	NPC
Quezon–4th	Oscar Santos	LP–PDP	Manolet Lavides	LDP
Quezon City–1st	Renato Yap	LDP	Renato Yap	LDP
Quezon City–2nd	Antonio Aquino	Independent	Dante Liban	LDP
Quezon City–3rd	Nikki Coseteng	NPC	Dennis Roldan	LDP
Quezon City–4th	Mel Mathay	LDP	Feliciano Belmonte Jr.	Independent
Quirino	Junie Cua	LDP	Junie Cua	LDP
Rizal–1st	Francisco Sumulong	Lakas	Manuel Sanchez	LP–PDP
Rizal–2nd	Emigdio Tanjuatco Jr.	LDP	Emigdio Tanjuatco Jr.	LDP
Romblon	Natalio Beltran Jr.	LDP	Eleandro Jesus Madrona	Lakas
Samar–1st	Jose Roño	Nacionalista	Rodolfo Tuazon	LDP
Samar–2nd	Venancio Garduce	LDP	Catalino Figueroa	LP–PDP
San Juan–Mandaluyong	Ronaldo Zamora	LDP	Ronaldo Zamora	LDP
Siquijor	Orlando Fua	LDP	Orlando Fua	LDP
Sorsogon–1st	Salvador Escudero	NPC	Salvador Escudero	NPC
Sorsogon–2nd	Bonifacio Gillego	Lakas	Bonifacio Gillego	Lakas
South Cotabato–1st	Adelbert Antonino	LDP	Luwalhati Antonino	LDP
South Cotabato–2nd	Hilario de Pedro III	LDP	Daisy Avance Fuentes	Koalisyong Pambansa/NPC
South Cotabato–3rd	James Chiongbian	LDP	James Chiongbian	LDP
Southern Leyte	Rosette Lerias	KBL/NPC	Roger Mercado	LDP
Sultan Kudarat	Estanislao Valdez	LDP	Estanislao Valdez	LDP
Sulu–1st	Abdusakur Mahail Tan	Lakas	Bensaudi Tulawie	Lakas
Sulu–2nd	Arden Anni	Lakas	Asani Tammang	LDP
Surigao del Norte–1st	Glenda Ecleo	LDP	Glenda Ecleo	LDP
Surigao del Norte–2nd	Constantino Navarro	KBL	Robert Barbers	Nacionalista
Surigao del Sur–1st	Mario Ty	LDP	Mario Ty	LDP
Surigao del Sur–2nd	Ernesto Estrella	LDP	Ernesto Estrella	LDP
Taguig–Pateros	Dante Tiñga	LDP	Dante Tiñga	LDP
Tarlac–1st	Peping Cojuangco	LDP	Peping Cojuangco	LDP
Tarlac–2nd	Jose Yap	LDP	Jose Yap	LDP
Tarlac–3rd	Herminio Aquino	LDP	Herminio Aquino	LDP
Tawi-Tawi	Romulo Espaldon	Lakas/UMDP	Nur Jaafar	LDP
Valenzuela	Antonio Serapio	NPC	Antonio Serapio	NPC
Zambales–1st	Katherine Gordon	NPC/Nacionalista	Katherine Gordon	NPC/Nacionalista
Zambales–2nd	Pacita Gonzales	LDP/Nacionalista	Antonio Diaz	Lakas
Zamboanga City	Maria Clara Lobregat	LDP	Maria Clara Lobregat	LDP
Zamboanga del Norte–1st	Artemio Adasa Jr.	Lakas	Artemio Adasa Jr.	Lakas
Zamboanga del Norte–2nd	Ernesto Amatong	LP–PDP	Ernesto Amatong	LP–PDP
Zamboanga del Norte–3rd	Angel Carloto	LDP	Angel Carloto	LDP
Zamboanga del Sur–1st	Isidoro Real Jr.	Lakas	Alejandro Urro	Lakas
Zamboanga del Sur–2nd	Antonio Cerilles	NPC	Antonio Cerilles	NPC
Zamboanga del Sur–3rd	Wilfredo Cainglet	LDP	Belma Cabilao	Lakas

== Defeated incumbents ==
1. Abra: Rudolfo Bernardez (NPC) lost to Jeremias Zapata (Lakas)
2. Aklan: Ramon Legaspi (NPC) lost to Allen Quimpo (LDP)
3. Baguio: Honorato Aquino (LDP) lost to Bernardo Vergara (NPC)
4. Batangas–1st: Conrado Apacible (LDP) lost to Eduardo Ermita (Lakas)
5. Bukidnon–2nd: Violeta Labaria (LDP) lost to Reginaldo Tilanduca (NPC)
6. Bulacan–1st: Francisco Aniag Jr. (LDP) lost to Teodulo Natividad (Lakas)
7. Bulacan–3rd: Jose Cabochan (Lakas) lost to Ricardo Silverio (LDP)
8. Cagayan–1st: Domingo Tuzon (Lakas) lost to Juan Ponce Enrile (Nacionalista)
9. Cagayan–2nd: Leoncio Puzon (LDP) lost to Edgar Lara (NPC)
10. Caloocan–1st: Romeo Santos (LDP) lost to Aurora Henson (Liping Kalookan/Independent)
11. Camarines Norte: Renato Unico (LDP) lost to Emmanuel Pimentel (NPC)
12. Cebu–1st: Antonio Bacaltos (Lakas) lost to Eduardo Gullas (NPC)
13. Davao City–2nd: Cornelio Maskariño (Koalisyong Pambansa) lost to Manuel Garcia (NPC)
14. Davao del Sur–2nd: Juanito Camasura Jr. (NPC) lost to Alejandro Almendras (Lakas)
15. Davao Oriental–1st: Enrico Dayanghirang (Koalisyong Pambansa) lost to Maria Elena Palma Gil (LDP)
16. Ifugao: Gualberto Lumawig (Lakas) lost to Benjamin Cappleman (LDP)
17. Kalinga-Apayao: William Claver (Lakas) lost to Elias Bulut (LDP)
18. Laguna–2nd: Jun Chipeco (NPC) lost to Rodolfo Tingzon (LDP)
19. Leyte–2nd: Manuel Horca (LDP) lost to Sergio Apostol (KBL)
20. Maguindanao–2nd: Guimid Matalam (Lakas/UMDP) lost to Simeon Datumanong (LDP/Nacionalista)
21. Misamis Occidental–1st: Julio Ozamiz (LDP) lost to Percival Catane (NPC)
22. Misamis Oriental–1st: Isacio Pelaez (Koalisyong Pambansa) lost to Homobono Cezar (LDP)
23. Northern Samar–2nd: Jose Ong Jr. (Lakas) lost to Wilmar Lucero (Koalisyong Pambansa)
24. Nueva Ecija–2nd: Simeon Garcia (LDP) lost to Eleuterio Violago (NPC/Balane)
25. Nueva Ecija–3rd: Hermogenes Concepcion Jr. (LDP) ran in Nueva Ecija's 2nd district and lost to Eleuterio Violago (NPC/Balane)
26. Occidental Mindoro: Mario Gene Mendiola (NPC) lost to Jose Villarosa (LDP)
27. Pampanga–3rd: Oscar Samson Rodriguez (LDP) lost to Andrea D. Domingo (Lakas)
28. Pangasinan–2nd: Antonio Bengson III (LDP) lost to Chris Mendoza (Lakas)
29. Pangasinan–3rd: Fabian Sison (LDP) lost to Eric Galo Acuña (NPC/KBL)
30. Quezon City–2nd: Antonio Aquino (Independent) lost to Dante Liban (LDP)
31. Romblon: Natalio Beltran Jr. (LDP) lost to Eleandro Jesus Madrona (Lakas)
32. Samar–1st: Jose Roño (Nacionalista) lost to Rodolfo Tuazon (LDP)
33. Samar–2nd: Venancio Garduce (LDP) lost to Catalino Figueroa (Koalisyong Pambansa)
34. Southern Leyte: Rosette Lerias (KBL/NPC) lost to Roger Mercado (LDP)
35. Sulu–2nd: Arden Anni (Lakas) lost to Asani Tammang (LDP)
36. Tawi-Tawi: Romulo Espaldon (Lakas/UMDP) lost to Nur Jaafar (LDP)
37. Zambales–2nd: Pacita Gonzales (LDP/Nacionalista) lost to Antonio Diaz (Lakas)
38. Zamboanga del Sur–3rd: Wilfredo Cainglet (LDP) lost to Belma Cabilao (Lakas)

== See also ==
- 9th Congress of the Philippines
- Rainbow Coalition (Philippines)
- 1992 Philippine Senate election

== Bibliography ==
- Paras, Corazon L. (2000). The Presidents of the Senate of the Republic of the Philippines. ISBN 971-8832-24-6.
- Pobre, Cesar P. (2000). Philippine Legislature 100 Years. ISBN 971-92245-0-9.
