= 8th Congress of the Philippines =

29th Legislative term of the Philippines

←	Regular Batasang Pambansa	9th	→
- Old Legislative Building (c. 1988) (top) and Batasang Pambansa Complex (2010) (bottom)

Overview
- Term: July 27, 1987 – May 25, 1992
- President: Corazon Aquino
- Vice President: Salvador Laurel

Senate
- Members: 24
- President: Jovito Salonga (until January 18, 1992); Neptali Gonzales (from January 18, 1992)
- President pro tempore: Teofisto Guingona Jr. (until July 23, 1990); Sotero Laurel (July 23, 1990 – January 18, 1992); Ernesto Maceda (from January 18, 1992)
- Majority leader: Orly Mercado (until July 23, 1990); Teofisto Guingona Jr. (July 23, 1990 – July 22, 1991); Alberto Romulo (from July 22, 1991)
- Minority leader: Joseph Estrada (until August 17, 1987); Juan Ponce Enrile (August 17, 1987 – January 18, 1992); Wigberto Tañada (from January 18, 1992)

House of Representatives
- Members: 214
- Speaker: Ramon Mitra Jr.
- Speaker pro tempore: Antonio Cuenco
- Majority leader: Francisco Sumulong
- Minority leader: Rodolfo Albano Jr. (until October 20, 1989); Mohammad Ali Dimaporo (October 20, 1989 – June 1, 1990); Salvador Escudero (June 1, 1990 – July 22, 1991); Victor Ortega (from July 22, 1991)

The 8th Congress of the Philippines (Filipino: Ikawalong Kongreso ng Pilipinas), composed of the Philippine Senate and House of Representatives, met from July 27, 1987, until May 25, 1992, during the presidency of Corazon Aquino. This was the first Congress after the ratification of the 1987 Constitution of the Philippines.

== Leadership ==
=== Senate ===
Senate President

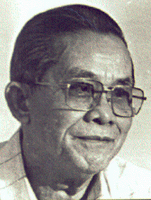
Jovito Salonga,
until January 18, 1992

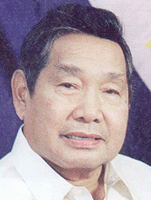
Neptali Gonzales,
from January 18, 1992

- President:
  - Jovito Salonga (Liberal), until January 18, 1992
  - Neptali Gonzales (LDP), from January 18, 1992
- President pro tempore:
  - Teofisto Guingona Jr. (Liberal), until July 23, 1990
  - Sotero Laurel (Nacionalista), July 23, 1990 – January 18, 1992
  - Ernesto Maceda (NPC), from January 18, 1992
- Majority Floor Leader:
  - Orly Mercado (Liberal), until July 23, 1990
  - Teofisto Guingona Jr. (Liberal), July 23, 1990 – July 22, 1991
  - Alberto Romulo (LDP), from July 22, 1991
- Minority Floor Leader:
  - Joseph Estrada (Liberal), until August 17, 1987
  - Juan Ponce Enrile (Nacionalista), August 17, 1987 – January 18, 1992
  - Wigberto Tañada (Liberal), from January 18, 1992

=== House of Representatives ===
House Speaker

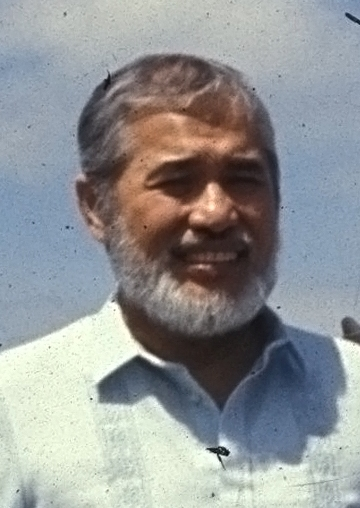
Ramon Mitra Jr.

- Speaker: Ramon Mitra Jr. (Palawan–2nd, PDP–Laban/Lakas ng Bansa)
- Speaker pro tempore: Antonio Cuenco (Cebu City–2nd, Lakas ng Bayan/Panaghiusa)
- Majority Floor Leader: Francisco Sumulong (Rizal–1st, PDP–Laban/Lakas ng Bansa/UNIDO)
- Minority Floor Leader:
  - Rodolfo Albano Jr. (Isabela–1st, KBL), until October 20, 1989
  - Mohammad Ali Dimaporo (Lanao del Sur–2nd, KBL), October 20, 1989 – June 1, 1990
  - Salvador Escudero (Sorsogon–1st, KBL), June 1, 1990 – July 22, 1991
  - Victor Ortega (La Union–1st, Nacionalista), from July 22, 1991

== Sessions ==
- First Regular Session: July 27, 1987 – June 10, 1988
- Second Regular Session: July 25, 1988 – June 8, 1989
  - First Special Session: January 9–13, 1989
- Third Regular Session: July 24, 1989 – June 7, 1990
  - Second Special Session: January 3, 1990
- Fourth Regular Session: July 23, 1990 – June 6, 1991
  - Third Special Session: December 17–21, 1990
- Fifth Regular Session: July 22, 1991 – May 25, 1992
  - Fourth Special Session: December 16–19, 1991

== Members ==
=== Senate ===
Final Senate composition.

All senators were elected on May 11, 1987 for terms that began on June 30, 1987, and ended on June 30, 1992.

Senator	Party
Heherson Alvarez	LDP (Note: Affiliated with Lakas ng Bansa at election.)
Edgardo Angara	LDP (Note: Independent at election)
Butz Aquino	LDP (Note: Affiliated with Bansang Nagkakaisa sa Diwa at Layunin at election.)
Joseph Estrada	NPC (Note: Affiliated with the Liberal Party at election.)
Neptali Gonzales	LDP
Teofisto Guingona Jr.	LDP
Ernesto Herrera	LDP
Sotero Laurel	Nacionalista (Note: Affiliated with the United Nationalist Democratic Organization at election.)
Joey Lina	LDP
Ernesto Maceda	NPC (Note: Affiliated with PDP–Laban at election.)
Raul Manglapus (Note: Raul Manglapus resigned on October 9, 1987, before being appointed as Secretary of Foreign Affairs.)	Lakas–NUCD (Note: Affiliated with the National Union of Christian Democrats at election.)
Orly Mercado	LDP
John Henry Osmeña	NPC
Vicente Paterno	PDP–Laban
Nene Pimentel	PDP–Laban
Juan Ponce Enrile (Note: Juan Ponce Enrile took office on August 15, 1987.)	Nacionalista
Leticia Ramos-Shahani	Lakas–NUCD
Nina Rasul (Note: Nina Rasul took office on July 26, 1987.)	Lakas–NUCD
Alberto Romulo	LDP
Rene Saguisag	Liberal
Jovito Salonga	Liberal
Mamintal A. J. Tamano (Note: Mamintal A. J. Tamano took office on July 6, 1987.)	LDP (Note: Affiliated with the Nacionalista Party at election.)
Wigberto Tañada	Liberal
Victor Ziga	Liberal

=== House of Representatives ===
Final House of Representatives composition.

Eighth Congress representation map of the Philippines

Province/City	District	Representative	Party
Abra	Lone	Rudolfo Bernardez	NPC
Agusan del Norte	1st	Charito Plaza	LDP
Agusan del Norte	2nd	Edelmiro Amante	Lakas–NUCD
Agusan del Sur	Lone	Democrito Plaza	LDP
Aklan	Lone	Ramon Legaspi	NPC (Note: Affiliated with Lakas ng Bayan at election.)
Albay	1st	Edcel Lagman	LDP
Albay	2nd	Carlos R. Imperial	NPC
Albay	3rd	Elfren Sarte (Note: Elfren Sarte died on July 22, 1988.)	Liberal
Antique	Lone	Exequiel Javier	Lakas–NUCD
Aurora	Lone	Benedicto Miran	LDP
Bacolod	Lone	Romeo Guanzon	LDP
Basilan	Lone	Alvin Dans	Koalisyong Pambansa (Note: Affiliated with the Liberal Party at election, which later became part of Koalisyong Pambansa for the 1992 elections.)
Bataan	1st	Felicito Payumo	Koalisyong Pambansa
Bataan	2nd	Tet Garcia	NPC
Batanes	Lone	Florencio Abad (Note: Florencio Abad resigned on December 12, 1989, upon being appointed as Secretary of Agrarian Reform.)	Liberal
Batangas	1st	Conrado Apacible	LDP
Batangas	2nd	Hernando Perez	LDP
Batangas	3rd	Milagros Laurel-Trinidad	Nacionalista
Batangas	4th	Jose Calingasan	Lakas–NUCD
Benguet	1st	Honorato Aquino	LDP
Benguet	2nd	Samuel Dangwa	LDP
Bohol	1st	Venice Borja-Agana	Lakas–NUCD
Bohol	2nd	David Tirol	NPC
Bohol	3rd	Isidro Zarraga	LDP (Note: Affiliated with Partido Panaghiusa at election.)
Bukidnon	1st	Socorro Acosta	Koalisyong Pambansa
Bukidnon	2nd	Violeta Labaria	LDP
Bukidnon	3rd	Jose Maria Zubiri Jr.	NPC
Bulacan	1st	Francisco Aniag Jr.	LDP
Bulacan	2nd	Vicente Rivera Jr.	NPC
Bulacan	3rd	Jose Cabochan	Lakas–NUCD
Bulacan	4th	Rogaciano Mercado (Note: Rogaciano Mercado died on November 13, 1989.)	LDP
Cagayan	1st	Domingo Tuzon	Lakas–NUCD (Note: Affiliated with the Grand Alliance for Democracy at election.)
Cagayan	2nd	Leoncio Puzon	LDP
Cagayan	3rd	Tito Dupaya (Note: Tito Dupaya died on April 1, 1989.)	LDP
Cagayan de Oro	Lone	Benedicta Roa	LDP
Caloocan	1st	Virgilio Robles (Note: Virgilio Robles was removed by the House of Representatives Electoral Tribunal on February 4, 1991, after an electoral protest.)	UNIDO
Caloocan	1st	Romeo Santos (Note: Romeo Santos took office on March 6, 1991, after winning an electoral protest against Virgilio P. Robles.)	LDP
Caloocan	2nd	Gerardo P. Cabochan	Koalisyong Pambansa (Note: Affiliated with PDP–Laban at election, which later became part of Koalisyong Pambansa for the 1992 elections.)
Camarines Norte	Lone	Renato Unico	LDP
Camarines Sur	1st	Rolando Andaya	Lakas–NUCD
Camarines Sur	2nd	Raul Roco	LDP
Camarines Sur	3rd	Eduardo Pilapil	Lakas–NUCD
Camarines Sur	4th	Ciriaco Alfelor	Koalisyong Pambansa
Camiguin	Lone	Pedro Romualdo	LDP
Capiz	1st	Gerardo Roxas Jr.	Koalisyong Pambansa/Lakas–NUCD/Nacionalista
Capiz	2nd	Cornelio Villareal	Koalisyong Pambansa
Catanduanes	Lone	Moises Tapia (Note: Moises Tapia died on November 15, 1987.)	Independent
Cavite	1st	Leonardo Guerrero	LDP (Note: Also affiliated with Magdalo.)
Cavite	2nd	Renato Dragon	LDP
Cavite	3rd	Jorge Nuñez	LDP (Note: Affiliated with Kilusang Bagong Lipunan at election.)
Cebu	1st	Antonio Bacaltos	Lakas–NUCD
Cebu	2nd	Crisologo Abines	LDP
Cebu	3rd	Pablo P. Garcia	Lakas–NUCD
Cebu	4th	Celestino Martinez Jr.	LDP
Cebu	5th	Ramon Durano III	LDP
Cebu	6th	Vicente dela Serna	LDP
Cebu City	1st	Raul del Mar	Panaghiusa
Cebu City	2nd	Antonio Cuenco	LDP
Cotabato	1st	Rodrigo Gutang	LDP
Cotabato	2nd	Gregorio Andolana	LDP (Note: Affiliated with Partido ng Bayan at election.)
Davao City	1st	Jesus Dureza (Note: Jesus Dureza was removed by the House of Representatives Electoral Tribunal on June 16, 1989, after an electoral protest.)	Independent
Davao City	1st	Prospero Nograles (Note: Prospero Nograles took office on August 1, 1989, after winning an electoral protest against Jesus Dureza.)	LDP
Davao City	2nd	Cornelio Maskariño	Koalisyong Pambansa
Davao City	3rd	Luis Santos (Note: Luis Santos resigned on October 27, 1987, upon being appointed as Secretary of Local Government.)	Lakas ng Bansa
Davao del Norte	1st	Lorenzo Sarmiento	LDP
Davao del Norte	2nd	Baltazar Sator	LDP
Davao del Norte	3rd	Rodolfo del Rosario	LDP
Davao del Sur	1st	Juanito Camasura Jr.	NPC
Davao del Sur	2nd	Benjamin Bautista Sr.	NPC/Nacionalista/KBL
Davao Oriental	1st	Enrico Dayanghirang	Koalisyong Pambansa
Davao Oriental	2nd	Thelma Almario	LDP
Eastern Samar	Lone	Jose Ramirez	Lakas–NUCD
Ifugao	Lone	Gualberto Lumauig	Lakas–NUCD
Ilocos Norte	1st	Roque Ablan Jr.	KBL
Ilocos Norte	2nd	Mariano Nalupta Jr.	KBL
Ilocos Sur	1st	Chavit Singson	LDP
Ilocos Sur	2nd	Eric Singson	LDP
Iloilo	1st	Oscar Garin	Lakas–NUCD
Iloilo	2nd	Alberto Lopez	Lakas–NUCD
Iloilo	3rd	Licurgo Tirador	Lakas–NUCD
Iloilo	4th	Narciso Monfort	LDP
Iloilo	5th	Niel Tupas Sr.	Koalisyong Pambansa
Iloilo City	Lone	Rafael Lopez-Vito	Lakas–NUCD
Isabela	1st	Rodolfo Albano Jr.	NPC
Isabela	2nd	Simplicio Domingo Jr.	Lakas–NUCD
Isabela	3rd	Santiago Respicio	Lakas–NUCD/LDP/NPC
Isabela	4th	Antonio Abaya	NPC/KBL/Nacionalista
Kalinga-Apayao	Lone	William Claver	Lakas–NUCD
La Union	1st	Victor Francisco Ortega	NPC
La Union	2nd	Jose Aspiras	NPC
Laguna	1st	Nereo Joaquin	NPC
Laguna	2nd	Jun Chipeco	NPC
Laguna	3rd	Florante Aquino	LDP
Laguna	4th	Magdaleno Palacol Sr.	LDP
Lanao del Norte	1st	Mariano Badelles	LDP
Lanao del Norte	2nd	Abdullah Dimaporo (Note: Abdullah Dimaporo resigned on December 12, 1989, to run in the 1990 Autonomous Region in Muslim Mindanao gubernatorial election.)	Nacionalista
Lanao del Sur	1st	Omar Dianalan (Note: Omar Dianalan died on April 30, 1990.)	PDP–Laban
Lanao del Sur	2nd	Mohammad Ali Dimaporo	KBL
Las Piñas/Muntinlupa	Lone	Filemon Aguilar	Independent
Leyte	1st	Cirilo Roy Montejo	LDP
Leyte	2nd	Manuel Horca Jr.	LDP
Leyte	3rd	Alberto Veloso	LDP
Leyte	4th	Carmelo Locsin	Lakas–NUCD
Leyte	5th	Eriberto Loreto	LDP
Maguindanao	1st	Michael Mastura	LDP
Maguindanao	2nd	Guimid Matalam	LDP/Nacionalista
Makati	Lone	Maria Consuelo Puyat-Reyes	LDP
Malabon/Navotas	Lone	Tessie Aquino-Oreta	LDP
Manila	1st	Martin Isidro	LDP
Manila	2nd	Jaime Lopez	Lakas–NUCD
Manila	3rd	Leonardo Fugoso	Koalisyong Pambansa
Manila	4th	Ramon Bagatsing Jr.	LDP (Note: Affiliated with KABAKA at election.)
Manila	5th	Amado Bagatsing	LDP
Manila	6th	Pablo Ocampo	NPC
Marikina	Lone	Democlito Angeles	Koalisyong Pambansa
Marinduque	Lone	Carmencita Reyes	LDP
Masbate	1st	Tito Espinosa	LDP
Masbate	2nd	Luz Cleta Bakunawa	LDP
Masbate	3rd	Moises Espinosa (Note: Moises Espinosa was assassinated on March 17, 1989.)	Independent
Misamis Occidental	1st	Julio Ozamiz	LDP
Misamis Occidental	2nd	Hilarion Ramiro Jr.	Lakas–NUCD
Misamis Oriental	1st	Isacio Pelaez	Koalisyong Pambansa
Misamis Oriental	2nd	Victorico Chaves	LDP
Mountain Province	Lone	Victor Dominguez	Lakas–NUCD
Negros Occidental	1st	Salvador Laguda	LDP
Negros Occidental	2nd	Manuel Puey	Koalisyong Pambansa
Negros Occidental	3rd	Jose Carlos Lacson	LDP
Negros Occidental	4th	Edward Matti	NPC
Negros Occidental	5th	Mariano Yulo	NPC
Negros Occidental	6th	Hortensia Starke	Lakas–NUCD
Negros Oriental	1st	Jerome Paras	Lakas–NUCD
Negros Oriental	2nd	Miguel Romero	LDP
Negros Oriental	3rd	Margarito Teves	LDP
Northern Samar	1st	Raul Daza	Koalisyong Pambansa
Northern Samar	2nd	Jose Ong Jr.	Lakas–NUCD
Nueva Ecija	1st	Eduardo Nonato Joson	BALANE
Nueva Ecija	2nd	Simeon Garcia Jr.	LDP (Note: Affiliated with the Bagong Lakas ng Nueva Ecija.)
Nueva Ecija	3rd	Hermogenes Concepcion Jr.	LDP
Nueva Ecija	4th	Nicanor de Guzman Jr. (Note: Nicanor de Guzman Jr. resigned on August 7, 1990.)	LDP
Nueva Vizcaya	Lone	Carlos Padilla	LDP
Occidental Mindoro	Lone	Mario Gene Mendiola	NPC
Oriental Mindoro	1st	Rodolfo Valencia	Koalisyong Pambansa
Oriental Mindoro	2nd	Jesus Punzalan	LDP
Palawan	1st	David Ponce de Leon	LDP
Palawan	2nd	Ramon Mitra Jr.	LDP
Pampanga	1st	Carmelo Lazatin Sr.	LDP
Pampanga	2nd	Emigdio Lingad	LDP
Pampanga	3rd	Oscar Samson Rodriguez	LDP
Pampanga	4th	Marciano Pineda (Note: Marciano Pineda was removed by the House of Representatives Electoral Tribunal on October 1, 1991, after an electoral protest.)	PDP–Laban
Pampanga	4th	Emigdio Bondoc (Note: Emigdio Bondoc took office on January 28, 1992, after winning an electoral protest against Marciano Pineda.)	Nacionalista
Pangasinan	1st	Oscar Orbos (Note: Oscar Orbos resigned on January 1, 1990, upon being appointed as Secretary of Transportation and Communications.)	LDP (Note: Affiliated with Bansang Nagkakaisa sa Diwa at Layunin.)
Pangasinan	2nd	Antonio Bengson III	LDP
Pangasinan	3rd	Fabian Sison	LDP
Pangasinan	4th	Jose de Venecia Jr.	Lakas–NUCD
Pangasinan	5th	Conrado Estrella Jr.	KBL
Pangasinan	6th	Conrado Estrella III	NPC/KBL/GAD (Note: Solely affiliated with Kilusang Bagong Lipunan at election.)
Parañaque	Lone	Freddie Webb	LDP
Pasay	Lone	Lorna Verano-Yap	Koalisyong Pambansa
Pasig	Lone	Rufino Javier	NPC
Quezon	1st	Wilfrido Enverga	LDP
Quezon	2nd	Mario Tagarao (Note: Mario Tagarao died on April 23, 1990.)	Liberal
Quezon	3rd	Bienvenido Marquez Jr.	NPC
Quezon	4th	Oscar Santos	Koalisyong Pambansa
Quezon City	1st	Renato Yap	LDP
Quezon City	2nd	Antonio Aquino	Independent
Quezon City	3rd	Nikki Coseteng	NPC (Note: Affiliated with Kababaihan para sa Inang Bayan at election.)
Quezon City	4th	Mel Mathay	LDP
Quirino	Lone	Junie Cua (Note: Junie Cua took office on November 9, 1987, after initially losing to Richard Puzon (PDP–Laban).)	LDP
Rizal	1st	Francisco Sumulong	Koalisyong Pambansa
Rizal	2nd	Emigdio Tanjuatco Jr.	LDP
Romblon	Lone	Natalio Beltran Jr.	Lakas–NUCD
Samar	1st	Jose Roño	Nacionalista
Samar	2nd	Venancio Garduce	LDP
San Juan/Mandaluyong	Lone	Ronaldo Zamora	LDP
Siquijor	Lone	Orlando Fua	LDP
Sorsogon	1st	Salvador Escudero	NPC
Sorsogon	2nd	Bonifacio Gillego	Lakas–NUCD
South Cotabato	1st	Adelbert Antonino	LDP
South Cotabato	2nd	Hilario de Pedro III	LDP
South Cotabato	3rd	James Chiongbian	LDP
Southern Leyte	Lone	Roger Mercado (Note: Roger Mercado was removed by the Supreme Court on October 15, 1991, after an electoral protest.)	LDP
Southern Leyte	Lone	Rosette Lerias (Note: Rosette Lerias took office on December 4, 1991, after winning an electoral protest against Roger Mercado.)	KBL
Sultan Kudarat	Lone	Estanislao Valdez	LDP
Sulu	1st	Abdusakur Mahail Tan	Lakas–NUCD
Sulu	2nd	Arden Anni	Lakas–NUCD (Note: Affiliated with the Citizens Call for Action Party of Zamboanga City at election.)
Surigao del Norte	1st	Glenda Ecleo	LDP
Surigao del Norte	2nd	Constantino Navarro Sr.	KBL
Surigao del Sur	1st	Mario Ty	LDP
Surigao del Sur	2nd	Ernesto Estrella	LDP
Taguig/Pateros	Lone	Dante Tiñga	LDP
Tarlac	1st	Peping Cojuangco	LDP
Tarlac	2nd	Jose Yap	LDP
Tarlac	3rd	Herminio Aquino	LDP
Tawi-Tawi	Lone	Alawadin Bandon Jr. (Note: Alawadin Bandon Jr. was removed by the House of Representatives Electoral Tribunal on November 16, 1990, after an electoral protest.)	PDP–Laban (Note: Affiliated with the Union of Muslim Democrats at election.)
Tawi-Tawi	Lone	Romulo Espaldon (Note: Romulo Espaldon took office on December 12, 1990, after winning an electoral protest against Alawadin Bandon Jr..)	Lakas–NUCD/UMDP
Valenzuela	Lone	Antonio Serapio	NPC
Zambales	1st	Katherine Gordon	NPC/Nacionalista
Zambales	2nd	Pacita Gonzales	LDP/Nacionalista
Zamboanga City	Lone	Maria Clara Lobregat	LDP
Zamboanga del Norte	1st	Artemio Adasa Jr.	Lakas–NUCD
Zamboanga del Norte	2nd	Ernesto Amatong	Koalisyong Pambansa
Zamboanga del Norte	3rd	Angel Carloto	LDP
Zamboanga del Sur	1st	Isidoro Real Jr.	Lakas–NUCD
Zamboanga del Sur	2nd	Antonio Cerilles	NPC
Zamboanga del Sur	3rd	Wilfredo Cainglet	LDP
Disabled		Art Borjal	Nonpartisan
Farmers		Daniel de Luna	Nonpartisan
Fisherfolk		Antonio Olegario Jr.	Nonpartisan
Labor		Adelisa Almario-Raymundo	Nonpartisan
Labor		Ramon Jabar	Nonpartisan
Labor		Alejandro Villavisa	Nonpartisan
Peasants		Romeo Angeles	Nonpartisan
Peasants		Bartolome Arteche	Nonpartisan
Urban Poor		Herminio Panganiban	Nonpartisan
Urban Poor		Rey Teves	Nonpartisan
Veterans and Elderly		Dionisio Ojeda	Nonpartisan
Women		Estelita Juco (Note: Estelita Juco died on July 7, 1989.)	Nonpartisan
Youth		Chito Gascon	Nonpartisan
Youth		Al Ignatius Lopez	Nonpartisan

== See also ==
- Congress of the Philippines
- Senate of the Philippines
- House of Representatives of the Philippines
- 1987 Philippine legislative election
