= Camiguin's at-large congressional district =

Legislative district of the Philippines

- Constituency for the House of Representatives of the Philippines
- Location of Camiguin within the Philippines
- Province: Camiguin
- Region: Northern Mindanao
- Population: 92,808 (2020)
- Electorate: 64,090 (2022)
- Area: 237.95 km^{2} (91.87 sq mi)

Current constituency
- Created: 1966
- Representative: Jurdin Jesus M. Romualdo
- Political party: Lakas–CMD
- Congressional bloc: Majority

Camiguin's at-large congressional district is the sole congressional district of the Philippines in the province of Camiguin. It was created ahead of the 1969 Philippine House of Representatives elections following the separation of the island from Misamis Oriental to form its own province in 1966. The district was represented in the final congress of the Third Philippine Republic from 1969 to 1972, in the regular parliament that replaced the House of Representatives from 1984 to 1986, and in the restored House from the 8th Congress onwards. It is currently represented in the 20th Congress by Jurdin Jesus Romualdo of Lakas–CMD.

== Representation history ==
#	Image	Member	Term of office		Congress	Party	Electoral history
#	Image	Member	Start	End	Congress	Party	Electoral history
=== Camiguin's at-large district for the House of Representatives of the Philippines ===
District created June 18, 1966, from Misamis Oriental's at-large district.
1		Jose Paul N. Neri	December 30, 1969	September 23, 1972	7th	Nacionalista	Elected in 1969. Removed from office after imposition of martial law.
District dissolved into the nine-seat Region X's at-large district for the Interim Batasang Pambansa.
#	Image	Member	Term of office		Batasang Pambansa	Party	Electoral history
#	Image	Member	Start	End	Batasang Pambansa	Party	Electoral history
=== Camiguin's at-large district for the Regular Batasang Pambansa ===
District re-created February 1, 1984.
(1)		Jose Paul N. Neri	July 23, 1984	March 25, 1986	2nd	Independent	Elected in 1984.
#	Image	Member	Term of office		Congress	Party	Electoral history
#	Image	Member	Start	End	Congress	Party	Electoral history
=== Camiguin's at-large district for the House of Representatives of the Philippines ===
District re-created February 2, 1987.
2		Pedro Romualdo	June 30, 1987	June 30, 1998	8th	LDP	Elected in 1987.
2		Pedro Romualdo	June 30, 1987	June 30, 1998	9th	LDP	Re-elected in 1992.
2		Pedro Romualdo	June 30, 1987	June 30, 1998	10th	Lakas	Re-elected in 1995.
3		Jurdin Jesus M. Romualdo	June 30, 1998	June 30, 2007	11th	LAMMP	Elected in 1998.
3		Jurdin Jesus M. Romualdo	June 30, 1998	June 30, 2007	12th	NPC	Re-elected in 2001.
3		Jurdin Jesus M. Romualdo	June 30, 1998	June 30, 2007	13th	NPC	Re-elected in 2004.
(2)		Pedro Romualdo	June 30, 2007	April 24, 2013	14th	Lakas	Elected in 2007.
(2)		Pedro Romualdo	June 30, 2007	April 24, 2013	15th	Lakas	Re-elected in 2010. Died in office.
—	vacant		April 24, 2013	June 30, 2013	15th	–	No special election held to fill vacancy.
4		Xavier Jesus D. Romualdo	June 30, 2013	June 30, 2022	16th	NPC	Elected in 2013.
4		Xavier Jesus D. Romualdo	June 30, 2013	June 30, 2022	17th	PDP–Laban	Re-elected in 2016.
4		Xavier Jesus D. Romualdo	June 30, 2013	June 30, 2022	18th	Lakas	Re-elected in 2019.
(3)		Jurdin Jesus M. Romualdo	June 30, 2022	Present	19th	Lakas	Elected in 2022.
(3)		Jurdin Jesus M. Romualdo	June 30, 2022	Present	20th	Lakas	Re-elected in 2025.

== Election results ==
=== 2022 ===
2022 Philippine House of Representatives elections in Camiguin's Lone district
Party	Candidate	Votes	%
PDP–Laban	Jurdin Jesus Romualdo	33,079	61.78
Independent	Homer Mabale	16,757	31.30
Independent	Adriano Ebcas	3,703	6.92
Total votes		53,539	100.00
PDP–Laban hold			

=== 2019 ===
2019 Philippine House of Representatives elections in Camiguin's Lone district
Party	Candidate	Votes	%
PDP–Laban	Xavier Jesus Romualdo (Incumbent)	41,306	88.59
PDDS	Marcelino Sarigumba	4,861	10.43
Independent	Bienvenido Bete	458	0.98
Total votes		46,625	100.00
PDP–Laban hold			

=== 2016 ===
2016 Philippine House of Representatives elections in Camiguin's Lone district
Party	Candidate	Votes	%
Liberal	Xavier Jesus Romualdo (Incumbent)	40,383	88.56
PDP–Laban	Manuel Jaudian	5,217	11.44
Total votes		45,600	100.00
Liberal hold			

=== 2013 ===
2013 Philippine House of Representatives elections in Camiguin's Lone district
Party	Candidate	Votes	%
NPC	Xavier Jesus Romualdo		
Nacionalista	Homobono Adaza		
Total votes			
NPC hold			

=== 2010 ===
2010 Philippine House of Representatives elections in Camiguin's Lone district
Party	Candidate	Votes	%
Lakas	Pedro Romualdo (Incumbent)	35,223	77.42
Liberal	Florencio Narido Jr.	10,274	22.58
Total votes		46,830	100.00
Lakas hold			

=== 2007 ===
2007 Philippine House of Representatives elections in Camiguin's Lone district
Party	Candidate	Votes	%
Lakas	Pedro Romualdo	24,277	57.72
Independent	Noordin Efigenio Romualdo	16,877	40.13
Independent	Nicolas Neri	903	2.15
Total votes		42,057	100.00
Lakas hold			

=== 2004 ===
2004 Philippine House of Representatives elections in Camiguin's Lone district
Party	Candidate	Votes	%
NPC	Jurdin Jesus Romualdo (Incumbent)	31,549	76.96
Liberal	Ma. Esperanza Neri–Brandt	7,341	17.91
Independent	Alberto Zulueta Jr.	2,103	5.13
Total votes		40,993	100.00
NPC hold			

=== 2001 ===
2001 Philippine House of Representatives elections in Camiguin's Lone district
Party	Candidate	Votes	%
NPC	Jurdin Jesus Romualdo (Incumbent)	23,189	62.68
Partido Pilipino ng Camiguin	Homobono Erwin Adaza III	13,804	37.32
Total votes		36,993	100.00
NPC hold			

=== 1998 ===
1998 Philippine House of Representatives elections in Camiguin's Lone district
Party	Candidate	Votes	%
Lakas	Jurdin Jesus Romualdo	23,137	59.55
LAMMP	Antonio Callardo	15,700	40.41
KBL	Eleuterio Zaballero	14	0.04
Total votes		38,851	100.00
Lakas hold			

=== 1995 ===
1995 Philippine House of Representatives elections in Camiguin's Lone district
Party	Candidate	Votes	%
Lakas	Pedro Romualdo (Incumbent)	17,307	50.49
Nacionalista	Homobono Adaza	16,970	49.51
Total votes		34,277	100.00
Lakas hold			

=== 1992 ===
1992 Philippine House of Representatives elections in Camiguin's Lone district
Party	Candidate	Votes	%
LDP	Pedro Romualdo (Incumbent)	13,563	51.12
Lakas	Nicolas Neri	12,886	48.57
KBL	Faustino Neri Jr.	81	0.31
Total votes		26,530	100.00
LDP hold			

== See also ==
- Legislative districts of Camiguin
