= Sectoral representation in the Philippines =

Abolished political system of representation in the Philippines

Sectoral representation in the Philippines refers to the now abolished system of representation in the Batasang Pambansa, then the House of Representatives of the Philippines. This has been replaced with party-list representation in the House of Representatives of the Philippines.

Local legislatures were also mandated to have sectoral representatives, but only the election indigenous cultural minorities in some legislatures have seen daylight.

== In the Batasang Pambansa and House of Representatives ==
=== Prior to 1978 ===
The Malolos Congress, Philippine Assembly, the National Assembly, and the House of Representatives, have been solely elected from electoral districts.

=== 1973 constitution ===
The 1973 constitution introduced the parliamentary system of government, in the form of the Batasang Pambansa. It also introduced sectoral representation, which was derived from fascist Italy. It was a plan by president Ferdinand Marcos to institute a corporatist system in which every sector would have a single organization approved and controlled by him, with elections derived from sectoral organizations that have separate and officially sanctioned voter lists. However, Filipino society was too fluid and democratic traditions too strong for Marcos to impost corporatism; he instead appointed legislators to represent sectors.

=== 1987 constitution ===
After the ouster of Marcos in the People Power Revolution, President Corazon Aquino appointed a constitutional commission to draft a new constitution. In this commission, there was a strong support to add a party-list system in the new constitution. In transition, it was agreed to allow presidential appointment of up to 25 sectoral representatives for three legislative terms (that is, until 1998). The party-list system was first implemented during the 1998 elections.

=== List of members ===
In the Batasang Pambansa, the distribution of seats were as follows:

Sector	Allocation					Per parliament	
Sector	Luzon	Visayas	Mindanao	At-large	Total	IBP	RBP
Agricultural labor	2	1	1	0	4	4	3
Industrial labor	2	1	1	0	4	4	1
Youth	2	1	1	2	6	6	6
Total	6	3	3	2	14	14	10

In Congress, the allocation was as follows:

Sector	Allocation	Per Congress		
Sector	Total	8th	9th	10th
Labor	25	3	8	9
Peasants	25	2 (Note: In the 8th Congress, a representative each for farmers and fisherfolk were appointed, but separately grouped from peasants.)	2	5
Youth	25	2	0	3
Urban poor	25	2	1	2
indigenous cultural communities	25	0	1	1
Women	25	1 (Note: In the 8th Congress, women and the disabled were originally represented by one person; she died, and was replaced by a man, who then only represented the disabled.)	1	2
Youth	25	2	2	3
Veterans	25	1 (Note: In the 8th Congress, the veterans and elderly were represented by one person.)	0	0
Elderly	25	1	0	0
Disabled	25	1	0	0
Total	25	16	15	25

==== Agricultural labor/peasant ====
The peasant sector covers the agricultural group, which includes all persons who personally and physically till the land as their principal occupation, agricultural tenants and lessees, rural workers and farm employees, owner-cultivators, settlers and small fishermen

Leg	Term of office	Seat A	Seat B	Seat C	Seat D	Seat E
Seats created on February 7, 1978 as "agricultural labor".
IBP	June 12, 1978 – June 30, 1984	Rolando Bayot (Note: Member for the Visayas); Elected in 1978.	Jose Cervantes (Note: Member for Luzon); Elected in 1978.	Jiamil Ismael Dianalan (Note: Member for Mindanao); Elected in 1978.	Luis Taruc; Elected in 1978.; Re-elected in 1984.	N/A
RBP	June 30, 1984 – March 25, 1986	Flores Bayot; Elected in 1984.	Jose Bico; Elected in 1984.	—	Luis Taruc; Elected in 1978.; Re-elected in 1984.	N/A
Term expired upon dissolution of parliament on March 25, 1986. Seats renamed on June 18, 1987 as "peasant".
8th	June 30, 1987 – June 30, 1992	Romeo Angeles; Appointed in 1992.	Bartolome Arteche; Appointed in 1992.	—	—	—
9th	June 30, 1992 – June 30, 1995	Leonardo Montemayor; Appointed in 1992; Reappointed in 1995.	Vicente Tagle; Appointed in 1992; Reappointed in 1995.	—	—	—
10th	June 30, 1995 – June 30, 1998	Leonardo Montemayor; Appointed in 1992; Reappointed in 1995.	Vicente Tagle; Appointed in 1992; Reappointed in 1995.	Adolfo Geronimo; Appointed in 1995.	Arturo Olegario Jr.; Appointed in 1995.	Glicerio Tan; Appointed in 1995.
Seats dissolved with the adoption of the party-list system on 1998.

==== Disabled ====
The sector of the disabled covers the physically and socially disabled.

#	Member	Term of office	Leg	Electoral history
Seat created on June 18, 1987 as "disabled".
1	Estelita Juco; (Also represented women)	June 30, 1987 – July 7, 1989	8th	Appointed in 1987.; Died in office 1989.
2	Art Borjal	1989 – June 30, 1992	8th	Appointed in 1989.
Seat dissolved with the adoption of the party-list system on 1998.

==== Farmers ====
#	Member	Term of office	Leg	Electoral history
1	Daniel de Luna	June 30, 1987 – June 30, 1992	8th	Appointed in 1992.

==== Fisherfolk ====
#	Member	Term of office	Leg	Electoral history
1	Antonio Olegario Jr.	June 30, 1987 – June 30, 1992	8th	Appointed in 1992.

==== Indigenous cultural communities ====
The indigenous cultural communities sector covers all ethnic groups cultural communities.

#	Member	Term of office	Leg	Electoral history
Seat created on June 18, 1987 as "indigenous cultural communities".
1	Joseph Sibug	June 30, 1992 – June 30, 1995	9th	Appointed in 1992.; Died in office 1994.
2	Ronald Adamat	June 30, 1995 – June 30, 1998	10th	Appointed in 1995.
Seats dissolved with the adoption of the party-list system on 1998.

==== Industrial labor/labor ====
The labor group refers to the industrial labor group, which includes all non-agricultural workers and employees.

Leg	Term of office	Seat A	Seat B	Seat C	Seat D	Seat E	Seat F	Seat G	Seat H	Seat I
Seats created on February 7, 1978.
IBP	June 12, 1978 – June 30, 1984	Eulogio Lerum; Elected in 1978.; Re-elected in 1984.	Ruben de Ocampo; Elected in 1978.	Princess Porti Pacasum; Elected in 1978.	Januario Seno; Elected in 1978.	N/A				
RBP	June 30, 1984 – March 25, 1986	Eulogio Lerum; Elected in 1978.; Re-elected in 1984.	—	—		N/A				
Term expired upon dissolution of parliament on March 25, 1986. Seats renamed on June 18, 1987 as "labor".
8th	June 30, 1987 – June 30, 1992	Adelisa Almario-Raymundo; Appointed in 1987.	Ramon Jabar; Appointed in 1987.; Reappointed in 1992.; Reappointed in 1995.	Alejandro Villavisa; Appointed in 1987.	—	—	—	—	—	—
9th	June 30, 1992 – June 30, 1995	Tomas Fernandez Concepcion; Appointed in 1992.	Ramon Jabar; Appointed in 1987.; Reappointed in 1992.; Reappointed in 1995.	Temistocles Dejon Sr.; Appointed in 1992.; Reappointed in 1995.	Zoilo dela Cruz; Appointed in 1992.; Reappointed in 1995.	Andes Dinglasan Jr.; Appointed in 1992.; Reappointed in 1995.	Paterno Menzon; Appointed in 1992.	Ernesto Verceles; Appointed in 1992.; Reappointed in 1995.	Alejandro Villavisa; Appointed in 1992.; Reappointed in 1995.	—
10th	June 30, 1995 – June 30, 1998	Isidro Aligada; Appointed in 1995.	Ramon Jabar; Appointed in 1987.; Reappointed in 1992.; Reappointed in 1995.	Temistocles Dejon Sr.; Appointed in 1992.; Reappointed in 1995.	Zoilo dela Cruz; Appointed in 1992.; Reappointed in 1995.	Andes Dinglasan Jr.; Appointed in 1992.; Reappointed in 1995.	Gregorio del Prado; Appointed in 1995.	Ernesto Verceles; Appointed in 1992.; Reappointed in 1995.	Alejandro Villavisa; Appointed in 1992.; Reappointed in 1995.	Mohammad Omar Fajardo; Appointed in 1995.
Seats dissolved with the adoption of the party-list system on 1998.

==== Urban poor ====
The urban poor sector includes the underprivileged and homeless citizens in urban areas.

Leg	Term of office	Seat A	Seat B
Seats created on June 18, 1987 as "urban poor".
8th	June 30, 1987 – June 30, 1992	Herminio Panganiban; Appointed in 1987.	Rey Teves; Appointed in 1987.
9th	June 30, 1992 – June 30, 1995	Ariel Zartiga; Appointed in 1992.; Reappointed in 1995.	—
10th	June 30, 1995 – June 30, 1998	Ariel Zartiga; Appointed in 1992.; Reappointed in 1995.	Florante Tarona; Appointed in 1995.
Seats dissolved with the adoption of the party-list system on 1998.

==== Veterans and elderly ====
The veterans sector embraces persons recognized as such veterans by the Armed Forces of the Philippines.

The elderly sector covers persons who are sixty-five years of age or over.

This was supposedly two separate sectors, but was represented by one person in the 8th Congress.

#	Member	Term of office	Leg	Electoral history
Seats created on June 18, 1987 as "veterans," and "elderly".
1	Dionisio Ojeda	June 30, 1987 – June 30, 1992	8th	Appointed in 1992.
Seats dissolved with the adoption of the party-list system on 1998.

==== Women ====
The women sector shall cover all women.

Leg	Term of office	Seat A	Seat B
Seats created on June 18, 1987 as "women".
8th	June 30, 1987 – June 30, 1992	Estelita Juco; (Also represented the disabled); Appointed in 1987.; Died in office 1989.	—
9th	June 30, 1992 – June 30, 1995	Minerva Laudico; Appointed in 1992.; Reappointed in 1995.	—
10th	June 30, 1995 – June 30, 1998	Minerva Laudico; Appointed in 1992.; Reappointed in 1995.	Leonor Ines Luciano; Appointed in 1995.
Seats dissolved with the adoption of the party-list system on 1998.

==== Youth ====
In the Batasang Pambansa, the youth representatives are between 18 and 25 years of age.

In Congress, the youth sector embraces persons not more than thirty-five years of age.

Leg	Term of office	Seat A	Seat B	Seat C	Seat D	Seat E	Seat F
Seats created on February 7, 1978 as "youth".
IBP	June 12, 1978 – June 30, 1984	Macairog Aznar; Elected in 1978.	Judy Carunungan; Elected in 1978.	Danilo Concepcion; Elected in 1978.	Nurodin Mamaluba; Elected in 1978.	Luisito Patalinhug; Elected in 1978.	Rogelio Peyuan; Elected in 1978.
RBP	June 30, 1984 – March 25, 1986	Armando Aguja Jr.; Elected in 1984.	Roberto Antonio; Elected in 1984.	Maria Victoria Calderon; Elected in 1984.	Romel Cañete; Elected in 1984.	Edward Chua; Elected in 1984.	Nasser Mustafa; Elected in 1984.
Term expired upon dissolution of parliament on March 25, 1986.
8th	June 30, 1987 – June 30, 1992	Chito Gascon; Appointed in 1987.	Al Ignatius Lopez; Appointed in 1987.	—	—	—	—
9th	June 30, 1992 – June 30, 1995	Edgardo Avila; Appointed in 1992.; Reappointed in 1995.	Cesar Chavez; Appointed in 1992.	—	—	—	—
10th	June 30, 1995 – June 30, 1998	Edgardo Avila; Appointed in 1992.; Reappointed in 1995.	Felizardo Colambo; Appointed in 1995.	Anna Periquet; Appointed in 1995.	—	—	—
Seats dissolved with the adoption of the party-list system on 1998.

== In local legislatures ==
=== Legislatures under the Local Government Code ===
The Local Government Code of 1991 provided sectoral representation in local legislatures (Sangguniang Panlalawigan or provincial boards, Sangguniang Panlungsod or city councils, Sangguniang Bayan or municipal councils, and the Sangguniang Barangay or village councils). The Local Government Code allocated each sector in each legislature:

Sector	Total
Agricultural labor	1
Industrial labor	1
Women	1
Urban poor	1
Indigenous cultural minorities	1
Disabled	1
Total	3

However, the code states that the manner of election shall be in the manner as provided by law. Aside from the indigenous cultural minorities, no other law has been passed to facilitate the election of such sectoral representatives, and remains unfulfilled.

The Indigenous Peoples' Rights Act of 1997 mandates representation for indigenous peoples in local legislatures in places that they reside. The Indigenous Peoples Mandatory Representative (IPMR) has been elected in several legislatures throughout the country.

The Sangguniang Kabataan (SK) is meant to represent the youth in local legislatures. SK elections are on a separate electoral roll, and has been held in mostly in conjunction with barangay elections. A series of indirect elections from the barangay level to the provincial level allows for representation of the SK in local legislatures.

=== Bangsamoro Parliament ===
The Bangsamoro Organic Law provides sectoral representation in the Bangsamoro Parliament. Eight seats, or 10% the seats in parliament are allocated for these sectors:

Sector	Total
Non-Moro indigenous peoples (i.e. lumads)	2
Settler communities	2
Women	1
Youth	1
Traditional leaders	1
The ulama	1
Total	8

The Bangsamoro Transition Authority encouraged residents to run for these sectoral seats in the first elections in 2026, as they had noted that "these sectors usually hardly secure representation in the then-Regional Legislative Assembly".

== See also ==
- Philippines's 12th senatorial district, in the Senate
- Reserved political positions, in other countries
  - Functional constituency, in China
  - Nominated Member of Parliament, in Singapore
