= Anna Periquet =

Filipino-born entrepreneur advocate, businesswoman

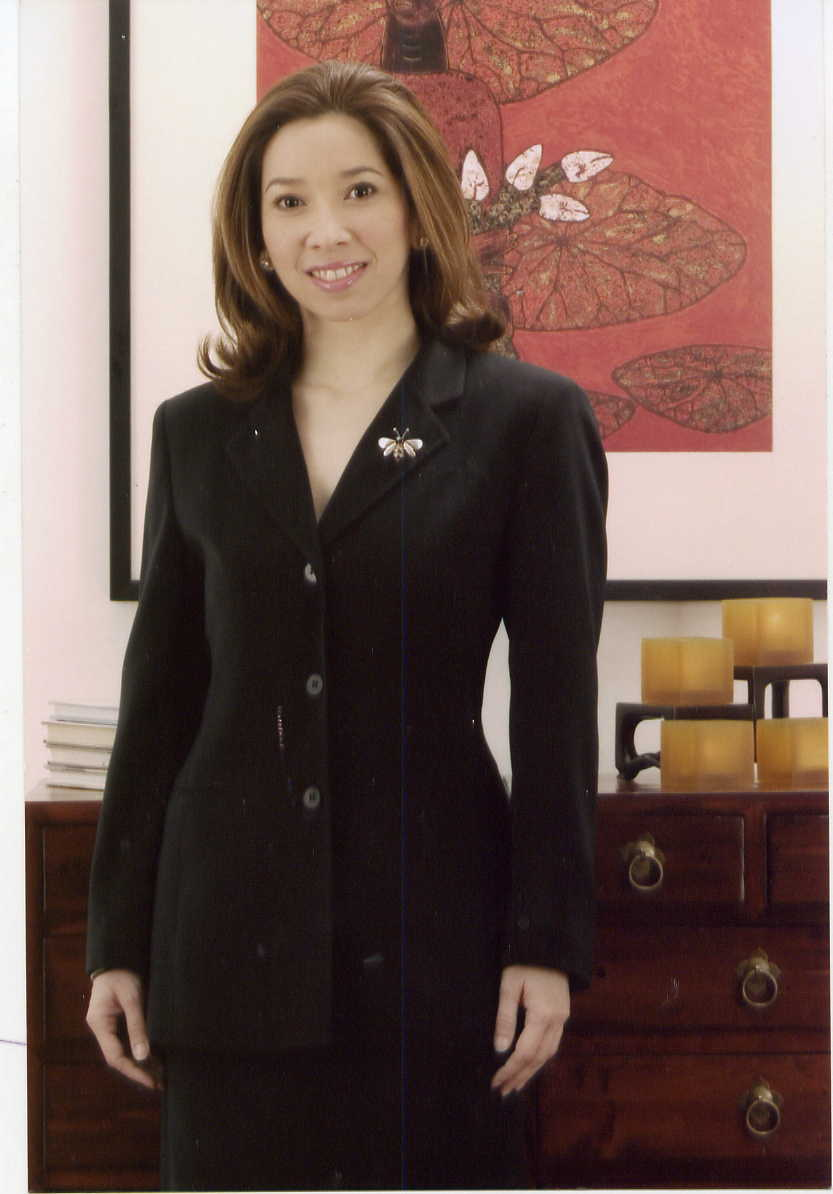

Member of the Philippine House of Representatives for the Youth
- In office June 30, 1995 – June 30, 1998
- Appointed by: Fidel V. Ramos

Anna Marie Periquet (born November 14, 1965) is a Filipino-born entrepreneur advocate, businesswoman, socio civic leader, talk show host, 5-dance Latin dancesport athlete and champion, public servant, and a former member of the House of Representatives.

== Early life and education ==
Periquet was born on November 14, 1965, in Manila, to the late Aurelio Periquet Jr. and the late Mary Anne Kessel. She is the youngest of the five daughters Patricia, Victoria, Sylvia and Angelica. Periquet's father, Aurelio Jr., was a prominent business leader and long-time Chairman of the Philippine Chamber of Commerce and Industry. At the time of his demise, he was a Monetary Board Member of the Bangko Sentral ng Pilipinas (Central Bank of the Philippines).

Periquet (pronounced Peri-kay) enjoys the best of four worlds and belongs to mixed heritage. Her French side is courtesy of her paternal grandfather Aurelio Periquet Sr. who was pure French. Her paternal grandmother, Purificacion Ortega, is of Spanish descent. Her German side is traced to her maternal grandfather, Max Kessel, who came from Düsseldorf to the Philippines during World War II as part of the US Forces. Her mother, Mary Anne, although born in Manila was an American citizen. Quoted in various interviews, Periquet is proud to say that despite the many types of blood running through her veins, she remains 100 percent Filipino.

Periquet obtained her elementary and secondary education from the Assumption College in Manila. In 1989, she graduated cum laude from the University of the Philippines with a degree in Broadcast Communication. In 1995, she completed a Fellowship in Active Labour Policy Development at the Institute for International Labour Studies of the International Labour Organization in Geneva, Switzerland. She earned her certificate with a citation as top of her class.

In 1994, Periquet was the Philippine Candidate to the Workshop for Government Officials of Asia-Pacific Countries In-charge of Youth Affairs held in Tokyo, Japan, followed by an Interaction Program in Kyoto University.

Periquet earned her certificate as a Certified Trainor of the Youth Entrepreneurship Training Trainor's Training from the Institute of Small Scale Industries, University of the Philippines.

== Business interests ==
Periquet is the President and COO of Anna Marie Home Collection (Philippines), Inc., owner of brand name Anna Marie Home (AMH). The company was incorporated in 2002 with its headquarters in Manila. It was established primarily as a retail outlet for furniture and home furnishings through its main showroom, Anna Marie Home, located in Makati City. In a short span of one year, the company's operations have expanded to include the exclusive distributorship of home furniture and furnishings to major chain stores, retail outlets and lifestyle boutiques in the Philippines. In 2006, AMHC closed its main showroom to focus on its expanding distribution network in major chain department stores. Product lines of AMHC include furniture, furniture decorators, home décor, plastic weave bags and baskets, tabletop ware, table linen, throw pillows.

In 2009, AMHC expanded its operations to manufacturing of lifestyle products for the home with the launch of its AMH Plastic Weave Collection (handbags, tote bags, hampers, gift boxes, organizers and baskets); and the AMH Soft Line Collection (throw pillows, table runners, and pouches).

AMHC is a member of local trade associations: the Philippine Chamber of Commerce and Industry (PCCI); and the Philippine Retailers Association (PRA), as well as international trade associations: Hong Kong Trade Development Council (HKTDC); and Trade Key International.

Periquet is the president of Asia-Pacific Business Consulting, Inc. (ABC). Periquet is also President of Kessel Dance Manila Corporation. She is a member of the boards of Periquet-Kessel Corporation; Initiatrix, Inc; and Flipbook Animation, Inc. She is also Consultant for Corporate Communications and External Affairs of Enchanted Kingdom.

Periquet was a member of the boards of Insurance of the Philippine Islands Co., Inc.; One Card Corporation; Unitrust Development Bank; KGI Securities ( Philippines ), Inc.; Metro Cebu Public Savings Bank; Maribeach Development Corporation; and Lupel Marketing Corporation, makers of Uni Writing Instruments, Mitsubishi Pencil Company, Japan.

== Entrepreneurship interests ==
Periquet is recognized as one of the prime movers of the youth entrepreneurship movement in the Philippines and in the Asia Pacific region since she started her advocacy in 1993 as founder of the Young Executives Business Club of the Philippine Chamber of Commerce and Industry (PCCI) in 1993. She is the author and proponent of the Youth Entrepreneurship Program or YEP. The YEP is now the flagship project of the government for entrepreneurship, and is being implemented by the National Youth Commission. The YEP is a comprehensive strategy that seeks to provide training and assistance for business plan development, access to credit and capital, mentoring, business incubation, market syndication and linking, business information networking and monitoring and assessment. During the early stages of the YEP, Periquet has worked on building the collective capacity of the local youth to undertake their own poverty alleviation programs by working closely with local chambers of commerce and industry and with government agencies in providing basic entrepreneurial training to youth leaders across the country as well as training for trainers to provide capability building from the national level down to the barangay level.

In 2000, Periquet was elected for a five-year term as board of director of the PCCI. She is the youngest member of the board ever elected to the PCCI. As Vice President for Enterprise Development, she spearheaded the Enterprise Development Program for Students or EDPS, a project geared towards developing entrepreneurship among the youth, by enhancing their business expertise, entrepreneurial skills and leadership qualities. The EDPS exposed the youth to the best practices of successful companies and models of good corporate cultures, in order to enrich their knowledge and develop their business potentials. The EDPS also helped graduating students acquire and develop skills for specific jobs by providing them with actual and hands-on exposure to the day-to-day operations of an enterprise, and at the same time practice what they have learned in school, with the internship program.

In 2004, Periquet was elected as the first chairperson of the Young Entrepreneurs Group of Asia-Pacific, or YEGAP, under the Confederation of Asia-Pacific Chambers of Commerce and Industry (CACCI), where she currently holds the position. Under her leadership, the YEGAP has established a strong base of small and medium scale enterprises run by young entrepreneurs to help boost the region's economy. The YEGAP has also developed and spearheaded projects to promote a pro-enterprise spirit for young entrepreneurs in collaboration with enterprises, universities, social corporations and foundations, and government. YEGAP projects include the cultivation from the young a culture of entrepreneurship by pushing for the inclusion of entrepreneurship subjects in the secondary and entrepreneurship departments in the tertiary level; pushing for the creation of business incubator facilities in universities; and spearheading the creation of entrepreneurship clubs in schools; introduction of the Buddy System or Big Brother, Little Brother Concept by passing on of second expertise from universities and large enterprises to budding entrepreneurs; providing internship programs through training opportunities to SMEs through visits and attachments to large enterprises in the region; and introduction of networking programs by encouraging the private sector to assist young and start-up entrepreneurs in networking through trade directories, trade missions, business matching and sub-contracting businesses.

Periquet is also the chairman of the Women Entrepreneurs Group Philippines to represent the Women Entrepreneurs Group in Asia Pacific. In 2005, Ms. Periquet was Lead Advocate of Go Negosyo!, a private sector-led movement under the Philippine Center for Entrepreneurship.

Periquet is the author and proponent of the LEADERS UNLIMITED, a nationwide business leadership seminar series on campus which takes part in the total development of potential young leaders through the conduct of seminars, workshops, and skills training that instil the correct values. LEADERS UNLIMITED passes on to graduating business students the actual business experiences from which they could learn. The seminars likewise orient the students on the correct business values through the success stories of guest entrepreneur speakers.

Periquet is a much sought-after keynote speaker for various entrepreneurship-related conferences and summits. She was selected as the Asian keynote speaker for the 29th National Annual Conference of the Young Entrepreneurs Group, Japan held in Aichi, Japan in 2005; and was selected as the Keynote Speaker for the 2007 Entrepreneurs Summit in Asia. Also, in 2007, she was invited to keynote the Council of Women Entrepreneurs of Asia-Pacific in Taipei, Taiwan, ROC. In 2010, she was selected as the Asian Keynote Speaker for The Philippine Experience in Entrepreneurship Working Hand-in-Hand in Advancing Philippine and Chinese Economies During the Women Leadership in Post-Crisis Era Summit during the World Expo in Shanghai, China. In 2011, she was appointed lead implementer of the Council on Access to Information on Business Regulations of the Asia Pacific Rule of Law under The World Justice Project held in Kuala Lumpur, Malaysia. She represents the Philippines in various international entrepreneurship fora as well.

== Socio-Civic involvement ==
Periquet remains active in various socio-civic organizations. She is the president of the Aurelio Periquet Jr. Foundation, established in honour of her late father. She is the driving force behind the Foundation as it institutionalized the prestigious Aurelio Periquet Jr. Business Leadership Awards, which are conferred annually by the President of the Republic of the Philippines. The Foundation also grants the Aurelio Periquet Scholarship Program to poor but deserving students.

Periquet is a member of the boards of the Philippine Institute for the Deaf, and Bahay ng Diyos Foundation. She is likewise a member of the Canada-Asia (Can-Asia) Businesswomen's Network; and Business for Integrity and Stability of Our Nation Foundation (BISYON 2020). She was also the Business Sector Representative of both the Out-of School Children and Youth Development Project of the Children and Youth Foundation; the National Coordinating Council of the Adopt-a-School Program; and also served a four-year term as Governor of the Philippine National Red Cross from 1998 to 2001.

== Government service ==
In 1992, Periquet was appointed by President Fidel V. Ramos as Council Member of the Presidential Council on Youth Affairs (PCYA), the predecessor of the National Youth Commission (NYC). As PCYA Council Member, she was permanent representative to the National ASEAN Sub-Committee on Youth of the Department of Foreign Affairs (DFA), and Philippine Representative to various international meetings on youth concerns. She was likewise nominated by DFA to represent the Philippines in the First Asia-Pacific Economic Cooperation (APEC) Next Generations Program held in Korea in 1994.

In 1995, President Ramos appointed Periquet as Youth Sector Representative in the Tenth Congress of the House of Representatives. As a member of the House of Representatives, she has distinguished herself as one of the chamber's strongest children rights advocates. She is the author of Republic Act 8525, or the “Adopt-a-School Act of 1998” which seeks to provide for access to quality education. To date, thousands of adopting entities have lent a helping hand to improve the conditions of thousands of schools nationwide. Through the efforts of the Department of Education, the Adopt-a-School Program has generated donations from adopting entities from the private sector. One of the positive changes brought about by the Adopt-a-School Program to the Philippine education system is the assurance of better education for the poor on a nationwide scale.

Periquet was also principal co-author and member of the House panel to the Bicameral Conference of Republic Act No. 8289 or the “Magna Carta for Small Enterprises.” She was chosen as one of the chamber's representatives to the Asia-Pacific Parliamentarian's Union (APPU) held in Port Moresby, Papua New Guinea in 1996, and in Fiji Island in 1997, wherein she presented the Philippine resolution on education.

During her stint in Congress, Periquet authored of over 20 House Bills, and co-author of over 100 House Bills on employment generation, entrepreneurship, education and protection of the rights of the youth and children. She spearheaded three major projects, namely: Youth Entrepreneurship and Cooperatives in Schools Program or "YECS sa DECS"; the Skills Training and Enhancement Program – Employment Accessibility Service for the Youth, or "STEP-EASY"; and the Youth Volunteer Network or "Y-VAN".

Following her stint in Congress, Periquet was appointed by President Joseph Estrada as Private Sector Representative to the Board of Small Business Guarantee and Finance Corporation (SBGFC) in 1998. She was re-appointed by President Gloria Macapagal Arroyo in 2001, and finished her term in 2009. SBGFC is mandated to source and adopt development initiatives for globally competitive small and medium enterprises in terms of finance, technology, production, management and business linkages, and to widen in both scope and service reach various alternative modes of financing and credit delivery systems.

== Awards and citations ==
Periquet is the recipient of several citations and awards from various organizations.

- 2013 CACCI Medallion in recognition of Entrepreneurship Leadership, conferred by the Confederation of Asia Pacific Chambers of Commerce and Industry (CACCI)
- 2012 Recognition, Outstanding Contribution to Education through the Authorship of Republic Act 8525 or the Adopt-a-School Law Conferred by the Department of Education
- 2010 Outstanding Woman in Entrepreneurship for exemplary achievements in Female Enterprise and Advocacy conferred by the International Women Entrepreneurial Challenge, in cooperation with the Department of State of the United States.
- 2009 Cited and featured in GO NEGOSYO: 55 Inspiring Stories of Women Entrepreneurs.
- 2008 Cited and featured in “Women Who Take the Lead: Profiles of Women Who Have Shaped Philippine Society” coffee table book
- 2007 “100 Most Successful Women in the Philippines” in celebration of Women's Day Centennial
- 2006 Distinguished Woman of Service Award
- 2003 Kabisig Parangal Awardee conferred by Kabisig Development for Progress
- 2002 Distinguished Young Official of the New Era Award conferred by the Leadership Organization of the Philippines
- 2001 Golden Leadership Award conferred by the Philippine Youth Association for Public Affairs, Inc.
- 1997 “Haligi ng Malayang Medya” Award conferred by the First Radio TV Movie Press Club of the Philippines
- 1996 Cited as one of the 16 Top Performers in the Tenth Congress by the Gladiators Magazine
- 1994 Metro Manila's Ten Outstanding Career Women
- 1994 Media Labor of the Philippines Award
- 1994 Gawad International Foundation Day Awardee
- 1994 Outstanding Personality in the Promotion of Philippine Progress, conferred by Press Media Affair

== Tri-Media involvement ==
Periquet is an opinion columnist of The Manila Times. She is host of the online business talk show Pinoy, Incorporated of One Pinoy Online TV at www.manilatimes-tv.net. She was a co-anchor of the multi-awarded business radio program “Radyo Negosyo” over DZMM.

== Dance and DanceSport ==
With dance partner Larry Iguidez Jr., she have received accolades from local and international competitions. Among the couple's notable championships are the gold medals for Latin 4-Dance and Latin 3-Dance in the 2008 International Millennium Open to the World Competition held in Singapore.

Periquet began formal training in Latin Discipline under World and Philippine DanceSport champion Edna Ledesma in 2006, and World 10-Dance DanceSport champion Paul Harris from United Kingdom. Harris is best known as the choreographer of Harry Potter films.

At the age of 3, Periquet began formal training in classical ballet under Totoy Oteyza and Inday Gaston Mañosa of Hariraya Dance Company. She also took classical ballet workshops in the US and in Geneva, Switzerland. At the age of 6, she began formal training in tap dance under Rose Borromeo of the Academy of the Performing Arts. Periquet is also technically trained in modern jazz, cheer dance and tap dance.

== Product endorsements ==
Periquet is a product endorser for MEMO Clothing by Penshoppe; of Sangobion Iron Supplements for Women; and of Phiten Titanium Sports Accessories.
