= Jurdin Jesus Romualdo =

Filipino politician

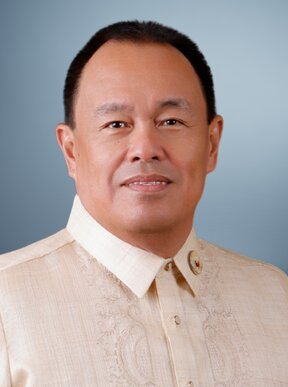
- Official portrait, 2025

Member of the Philippine House of Representatives from Camiguin's Lone District
- Incumbent
- Assumed office June 30, 2022
- Preceded by: Xavier Jesus Romualdo
- In office June 30, 1998 – June 30, 2007
- Preceded by: Pedro Romualdo
- Succeeded by: Pedro Romualdo

Governor of Camiguin
- In office June 30, 2019 – June 30, 2022
- Preceded by: Maria Luisa Romualdo
- Succeeded by: Xavier Jesus Romualdo
- In office June 30, 2007 – June 30, 2016
- Preceded by: Pedro Romualdo
- Succeeded by: Maria Luisa Romualdo

Personal details
- Born: July 26, 1960 (age 65) Manila, Philippines
- Party: Lakas (2022–present)
- Other political affiliations: PDP–Laban (2019–2022); NPC (2001–2019); LAMMP (1998–2001)
- Spouse: Maria Luisa Dela Fuente

Jurdin Jesus "JJ" Modina Romualdo (born July 29, 1960) is a Filipino politician from the province of Camiguin in the Philippines. He is currently serving as the Representative of Camiguin's lone district since 2022 and previously from 1998 to 2007. He was also elected Governor of the province from 2007 to 2016 and from 2019 to 2022.

== Early life ==
Jurdin Jesus Romualdo was born on July 29, 1960, in Manila. He studied in the Franciscan College of Immaculate Conception in Baybay for his primary school, graduating in 1972. He then attended the same school for secondary, graduating in 1976. He then studied in the Xavier University – Ateneo de Cagayan, gaining Bachelor of Arts in Economics in 1980. He attended his post-graduate studies at the University of the East, gaining Bachelor of Laws in 1986. Before entering politics, he was the Chief of Staff of Former Representative Pedro Romualdo.

== House of Representatives ==
=== 11th Congress ===
He was elected as a representative of the lone district of Camiguin in the 1998 Philippine general election. During his tenure in the 11th Congress of the Philippines, he was part of President Joseph Estrada's Bright Boys, a group of representatives which supported the tenure of Estrada. On June 30, 2000, he called for partnerships with non-governmental organizations for better education.

=== 12th Congress ===
He was elected as a representative of the lone district of Camiguin in the 2001 Philippine general election. During his tenure in the 12th Congress of the Philippines, he filed a house resolution calling for a probe about the roadworthiness of Ford cars. According to the Manila Standard as of September 9, 2002, Romualdo had perfect attendance.

=== 13th Congress ===
He was elected as a representative of the lone district of Camiguin in the 2004 Philippine general election. During his tenure in the 13th Congress of the Philippines, he was the chair of the defense committee of a motion Senator Jinggoy Estrada filed against Hermogenes Esperon Jr. for his involvement in the Hello Garci scandal.

=== 19th Congress ===
He ran as a representative for Camiguin's lone district in the 2022 Philippine general election under Partido Demokratiko Pilipino. He won with 33,079 votes, 61.78 percent of the votes, beating two other independent candidates. He proposed a budget of 1,000 pesos for the National Commission on Indigenous Peoples.

== Governor of Camiguin ==
He was elected as the Governor of Camiguin in the 2007 Philippine gubernatorial elections. He was elected as the Governor of Camiguin in the 2010 Philippine gubernatorial elections. He was elected as the Governor of Camiguin in the 2013 Philippine gubernatorial elections. After a break, he ran as the governor in the 2019 Philippine gubernatorial elections under the Nationalist People's Coalition. He won with 40,217 votes, beating two other candidates.
