= Rogaciano Mercado =

Filipino lawyer and politician (1916–1989)

Rogaciano M. Mercado
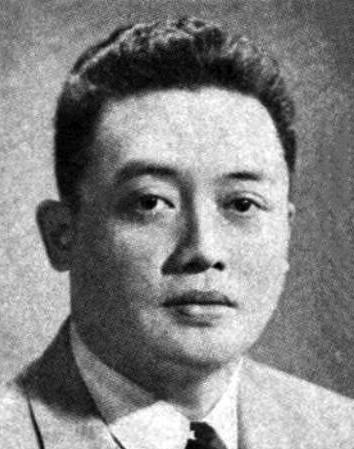
- Mercado during the 3rd Congress of the Philippines, c. 1955

Member of the House of Representatives of the Philippines from Bulacan's 4th district
- In office June 30, 1987 – November 13, 1989
- Preceded by: District established
- Succeeded by: Angelito Sarmiento

Minister of Public Works and Highways
- In office February 1986 – November 1986
- President: Corazon Aquino
- Preceded by: Jesus Hipolito
- Succeeded by: Vicente Jayme

Member of the Regular Batasang Pambansa from Bulacan
- In office 1984–1986 Serving with Jesus Hipolito, Teodulo Natividad, Blas Ople

Member of the House of Representatives of the Philippines from Bulacan's 2nd district
- In office December 30, 1953 – September 23, 1972
- Preceded by: Alejo Santos
- Succeeded by: District representation suspended

Personal details
- Born: November 5, 1916
- Died: November 13, 1989 (aged 73)
- Education: University of the Philippines
- Occupation: Lawyer, politician, radio broadcaster

Rogaciano M. Mercado (November 5, 1916 – November 13, 1989), also known by the nickname Roning, was a Filipino lawyer, radio broadcaster and politician who represented Bulacan in the Philippine legislature over several decades. He represented Bulacan's 2nd congressional district in the House of Representatives of the Philippines from 1953 until 1972, was elected as one of Bulacan's representatives to the Regular Batasang Pambansa in 1984, and served as Minister of Public Works and Highways under President Corazon Aquino in 1986.

Mercado was an opposition politician during the administration of President Ferdinand Marcos. In 1979, he was placed under house arrest in connection with the distribution of Ang Demokrasya sa Pilipinas, a book by former president Diosdado Macapagal criticizing martial law which Mercado had translated into Tagalog. He returned to the House in 1987 as the first representative of the newly created 4th district of Bulacan, serving until his death in 1989.

== Early life and legal career ==
Mercado was born on November 5, 1916, to Angel Mercado, a school principal, and Apolonia Mercado. His family was associated with Santa Maria, Bulacan.

He studied law at the University of the Philippines, completing his law course in 1940. While a student, he participated in oratorical competitions and received awards for public speaking.

Mercado subsequently practiced law in Bulacan. He served as president of the Bulacan Bar Association from 1954 to 1962.

He was also involved in radio broadcasting. Mercado hosted the nightly program Ako'y Tagabukid on radio station DZBU, where he discussed issues affecting farmers and rural communities, including labor practices, union membership and electoral issues.

== Political career ==
=== House of Representatives ===
Mercado entered electoral politics in 1953, when he was elected to represent Bulacan's 2nd congressional district in the House of Representatives. He was subsequently returned to the House in successive elections and represented the district through the 3rd, 4th, 5th, 6th and 7th Congresses. His congressional service ended in 1972 after the declaration of martial law and the suspension of the pre-martial-law Congress.

Mercado's legislative work included measures involving agriculture, public health and infrastructure in Bulacan. The Provincial Government of Bulacan credits him with sponsoring the legislation that established the San Miguel Emergency Hospital, which was enacted as Republic Act No. 3159.

A 2016 retrospective in The Philippine Star also identified Mercado as a principal legislative advocate of the Angat Dam project, which was developed as a major source of water and hydroelectric power in Central Luzon.

=== Opposition during the Marcos administration ===
After his earlier congressional service, Mercado returned to legal practice. During the Marcos administration he became involved in opposition activities.

Mercado translated former president Diosdado Macapagal's book Ang Demokrasya sa Pilipinas into Tagalog. The work was critical of martial-law rule. In August 1979, Mercado and other individuals connected with the publication and distribution of the book were subjected to an Arrest, Search and Seizure Order and placed under house arrest.

In a dissenting opinion in the 1989 Supreme Court case Marcos v. Manglapus, Justice Abraham Sarmiento recalled that he, Macapagal, Mercado and former congressman Manuel Concordia had been accused of "inciting to sedition" and "rumor mongering" in connection with the book's distribution.

=== Regular Batasang Pambansa ===
Mercado returned to elected national office in the 1984 Philippine parliamentary election. Running as a member of the opposition United Nationalist Democratic Organization (UNIDO) coalition, he won one of Bulacan's seats in the Regular Batasang Pambansa.

On January 15, 1985, Mercado delivered a speech in the Batasang Pambansa criticizing President Marcos after the president publicly faulted the legislature for what he characterized as delays in legislative work. Mercado argued that the opposition's refusal to support the administration automatically should not be regarded as legislative obstruction. The speech was subsequently expunged from the parliamentary record following a motion by Assemblyman Leonardo Perez.

=== Minister of Public Works and Highways ===
Following the People Power Revolution in February 1986, President Corazon Aquino included Mercado in her new Cabinet as Minister of Public Works and Highways. A June 1986 presidential memorandum formally listed Rogaciano M. Mercado among the members of the Cabinet in his capacity as Minister of Public Works and Highways.

Mercado succeeded Jesus Hipolito, who had headed the public works ministry under Marcos. During Mercado's tenure, the ministry continued to oversee national public-works and infrastructure programs.

In November 1986, Aquino accepted the resignations of Mercado and Natural Resources Minister Ernesto Maceda as part of a Cabinet reorganization. Mercado was succeeded by Philippine National Bank president Vicente Jayme.

=== Return to the House ===
Mercado contested the 1987 congressional election and was elected as the first representative of the newly created Bulacan's 4th congressional district. His district at the time included municipalities in southeastern Bulacan, including Santa Maria, Meycauayan, Marilao, Obando and San Jose del Monte.

During the 8th Congress, Mercado introduced legislation on education, health care, local government, public infrastructure and other subjects. The Senate of the Philippines Legislative Reference Bureau lists him as principal author of numerous House measures filed between 1987 and 1989.

Among these was House Bill No. 3992, which proposed the establishment of the Meycauayan National High School, and House Bill No. 12164, which proposed the establishment of the Obando National High School. He also principally authored House Bill No. 21253, which sought to designate the Plaridel–Bustos–Angat–Norzagaray–Santa Maria highway as the General Alejo Santos Highway.

Mercado was also the principal author of House Bill No. 24890, legislation regulating firecrackers and pyrotechnic devices. The measure continued through the legislative process following his death and was eventually enacted in 1992 as Republic Act No. 7183.

== Death and legacy ==
Mercado died on November 13, 1989, eight days after his 73rd birthday, while serving as representative of Bulacan's 4th district. His congressional seat remained vacant following his death.

Several public institutions and facilities in Bulacan have subsequently borne Mercado's name. In 1992, Congress enacted Republic Act No. 7402, changing the name of the Sta. Maria General Hospital in Santa Maria, Bulacan, to the Rogaciano M. Mercado Memorial General Hospital. The law was signed by President Corazon Aquino on April 14, 1992.

The hospital continues to operate in Santa Maria under his name as part of the provincial government hospital system.
