= Art Borjal =

Member of the Philippine House of Representatives for the disabled
- In office 1990 – June 30, 1992
- Appointed by: Corazon Aquino
- Preceded by: Estelita Juco
- Succeeded by: none

Personal details
- Born: Arturo Acosta Borjal; April 15, 1938 La Paz, Abra, Philippine Commonwealth
- Died: June 6, 2002 (aged 64)
- Education: Ateneo de Manila University (BA Humanities) (Bachelor of Laws)
- Occupation: journalist, newspaper president, activist, legislator, lawyer
- Known for: co-founder of The Philippine Star principal author of Magna Carta for Persons with Disabilities or RA 7277); Borjal vs Court of Appeals

Arturo "Art" Acosta Borjal (April 15, 1938 – June 6, 2002) was a Filipino journalist, newspaper president, legislator, and lawyer. He co-founded both the Philippine Daily Inquirer in 1985 and The Philippine Star in 1986.

Jaywalker was the daily column of Borjal for years at the Philippine Star.

== Early life and education ==
Being crippled by polio at the age of three, Borjal was carried by his mother on her back to attend school. He had leg braces and crutches and went on to finish humanities and law studies at Ateneo de Manila University while tripling as editor-in-chief of The Guidon, president of the debating team and the Supreme Student Council.

== As congressman for the disabled ==
President Corazon Aquino appointed Borjal as a congressman for the disabled, one of its sectoral representatives in the 8th Congress. Borjal worked on the approval of the Magna Carta for Persons with Disabilities, it being approved in 1992.

== As journalist and leader of journalists ==
Borjal wrote the column Jaywalker on The Philippine Star, the newspaper that he had co-founded. The column's title was a pun on the fact that since he was crippled, he cannot be arrested for jaywalking.

Borjal was president of the Manila Overseas Press Club and the National Press Club.

"In Borjal v. Court of Appeals," a Supreme Court decision wrote, "the enumeration under Art. 354 is not an exclusive list of qualifiedly privileged communications since fair commentaries on matters of public interest are likewise privileged. We stated that the doctrine of fair commentaries means "that while in general every discreditable imputation publicly made is deemed false, because every man is presumed innocent until his guilt is judicially proved, and every false imputation is deemed malicious, nevertheless, when the discreditable imputation is directed against a public person in his public capacity, it is not necessarily actionable. In order that such discreditable imputation to a public official may be actionable, it must either be a false allegation of fact or a comment based on a false supposition." Thus the petition of Borjal and Max Soliven was granted, and the Decision of the Court of Appeals of 25 March 1996 and its Resolution of 12 September 1996 denying reconsideration were reversed and set aside, and the complaint for damages against petitioners was dismissed.

== As an activist and humanitarian ==
Philippine Permanent Representative to the United Nations Ambassador Alfonso Yuchengco described Borjal: "Art was not only a fine journalist, he was a humanitarian who used his popular column to give comfort to many people who needed help – the sick, the poor, the harassed and the oppressed."

Former Vice President Emmanuel Pelaez once told Borjal, "Thank God for the man for others that you are."

== Death ==
Before his death on June 6, 2002, Borjal had been fighting cancer for three years.
