= Governor of Camiguin =

Local chief executive

Provincial Governor of Camiguin
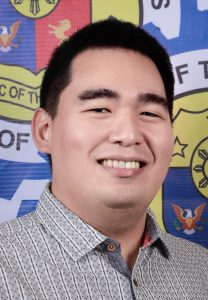
- Incumbent; Xavier Jesus Romualdo since June 30, 2022
- Appointer: Elected via popular vote
- Term length: 3 years
- Formation: 1968

The governor of Camiguin (Filipino: Punong Panlalawigan ng Camiguin), is the chief executive of the provincial government of Camiguin.

== Provincial Governors ==
	Governor	Term
1	Antonieto Gallardo	1987-1998
2	Pedro Romualdo	1998-2007
3	Jurdin Jesus Romualdo	2007-2016
4	Maria Luisa Romualdo	2016-2019
(3)	Jurdin Jesus Romualdo	2019-2022
5	Xavier Jesus Romualdo	2022-present
