= Xavier Jesus Romualdo =

Filipino lawyer and politician

The Honorable Xavier Jesus Romualdo
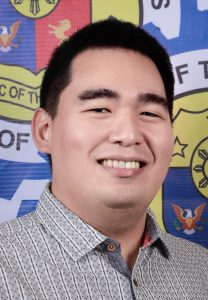
- Romualdo in 2022

Governor of Camiguin
- Incumbent
- Assumed office June 30, 2022
- Vice Governor: Rodin Romualdo
- Preceded by: Jurdin Jesus Romualdo

Member of the House of Representatives of the Philippines for Camiguin's at-large congressional district
- In office June 30, 2013 – June 30, 2022
- Preceded by: Pedro Romualdo
- Succeeded by: Jurdin Jesus Romualdo

Personal details
- Born: Xavier Jesus Dela Fuente Romualdo; December 5, 1986 (age 39) Cagayan de Oro, Philippines
- Party: Lakas (2020–present)
- Other political affiliations: PDP–Laban (2017–2020); Liberal (2015–2017); NPC (2012–2015)
- Relations: Jurdin Jesus Romualdo (father); Pedro Romualdo (grandfather)
- Occupation: Politician

Xavier Jesus Dela Fuente Romualdo (born December 5, 1986) is a Filipino lawyer and politician who has served as Governor of Camiguin since 2022.

== See also ==
- List of current Philippine governors
