= Nicanor de Guzman Jr. =

Filipino politician (1932–2012)

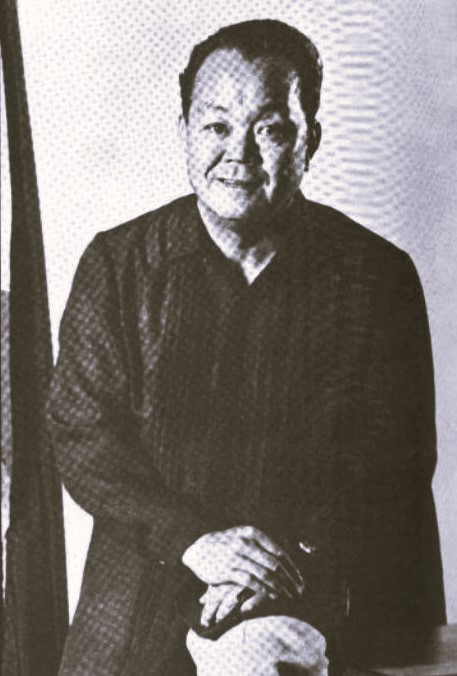
- de Guzman official portrait during the 8th Congress.

Member of the Philippine House of Representatives from Nueva Ecija's 4th District
- In office June 30, 1987 – August 7, 1990
- Preceded by: District re-established
- Succeeded by: Victorio Lorenzo

Personal details
- Born: Nicanor Garcia de Guzman Jr. January 15, 1932 Gapan, Nueva Ecija, Philippine Islands
- Died: February 12, 2012 (aged 80)
- Party: BALANE (1988–2004)
- Other political affiliations: LnB (1987–1988)
- Occupation: Politician
- Criminal information
- Status: Pardoned (2004)
- Criminal charges: Smuggling of illegal firearms (1998)

Nicanor Garcia de Guzman Jr. (January 15, 1932 – February 12, 2012) was a Filipino politician who was a member of the House of Representatives for Nueva Ecija's 4th district from 1987 to 1990.

== Political career ==
=== 1989 smuggling case and resignation ===
On September 5, 1989, De Guzman illegally brought in firearms to the Philippines through Ninoy Aquino International Airport upon his return flight from the United States. De Guzman was suspended by the House of Representatives on September 12, 1989, for 60 days. He was originally recommended for expulsion.

The Pasay Regional Trial Court found De Guzman guilty of smuggling in August 1990. De Guzman resigned instead of waiting for the House of Representatives to expel him. He started serving his sentence in 1995 but was later granted absolute pardon in 1998 by President Joseph Estrada.

=== 2004 elections ===
De Guzman attempted to make a comeback in politics when he took part in the 2004 election upon the encouragement of then-Nueva Ecija governor Tomas Joson III. He ran for a place in the 4th district of the Nueva Ecija Provincial Board. Garnering 53,197 votes, he failed to get elected finishing fifth among eight candidates.

== Illness and death ==
De Guzman died on February 12, 2012, due to a lingering liver and pancreatic illness he was diagnosed of in November 2011.

== See also ==
- List of members of the Philippine House of Representatives expelled, removed, or suspended
