= Legislative districts of Camiguin =

Districts of Philippine province

The legislative districts of Camiguin are the representations of the province of Camiguin in the various national legislatures of the Philippines. The province is currently represented in the lower house of the Congress of the Philippines through its lone congressional district.

== History ==
Prior to gaining separate representation, areas now under the jurisdiction of Camiguin were represented under the undivided Misamis Province (1898–1931) and Misamis Oriental (1931–1969).

The enactment of Republic Act No. 4669 on June 18, 1966, separated Camiguin from Misamis Oriental; per Section 4 of the said law, the incumbent representative for Misamis Oriental continued to represent Camiguin until its separate representative was elected in the November 1969 elections.

Camiguin was represented in the Interim Batasang Pambansa as part of Region X from 1978 to 1984, and returned one representative, elected at large, to the Regular Batasang Pambansa in 1984.

Under the new Constitution which was proclaimed on February 11, 1987, the province constituted a lone congressional district, and elected its member to the restored House of Representatives starting that same year.

== Current districts ==
Legislative Districts and Congressional Representatives of Camiguin
District	Current Representative	Party	Population (2020)	Area
Lone	Jurdin Jesus Romualdo (since 2022)	Lakas–CMD	92,808	237.95 km^{2}
