= Estelita Juco =

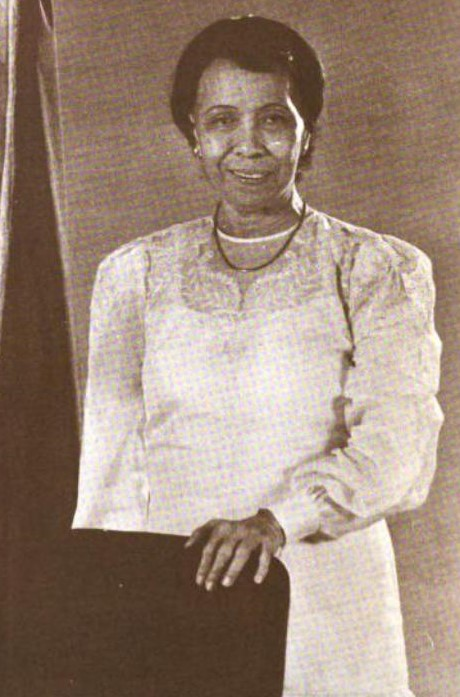

Member of the Philippine House of Representatives for women and the disabled
- In office August 10, 1987 – July 12, 1989
- Appointed by: Corazon Aquino
- Preceded by: None; seats created
- Succeeded by: Art Borjal (for disabled); Minerva Laudico (for women)

Personal details
- Born: Estelita Guinto Juco; May 13, 1930
- Died: July 12, 1989 (aged 59)
- Education: St. Paul College Manila

Estelita "Esty" Guinto Juco (May 13, 1930 – July 12, 1989) was a Filipino writer, educator, public relations practitioner, civil service executive, and congresswoman known for her advocacy in the areas of pacifism, democracy, and disability rights.

== Life ==
As a teenager, Juco had been severely injured during the Battle of Manila in World War II, when a bomb hit the Philippine General Hospital where she and her brother had taken refuge. Her brother was killed, and she herself ultimately lost an arm and suffered damage to one of her eyes as a result of the explosion.

After the war and despite her injuries, she continued her education at St. Paul College of Manila, and played various leadership role in various college and inter-university organizations including the College Editors Guild, the Student Catholic Action, the Conference Delegates Association and the Student Council Association. Juco graduated cum laude and then joined the St. Paul's College faculty, teaching various subjects including English, journalism, sociology, public relations, and history. Throughout the 1950s and early 1960s, she volunteered in the election campaigns of various candidates, including Ramon Magsaysay's successful 1953 presidential campaign, and the campaigns of Manuel Manahan in 1957 and of Raul Manglapus 1964, although both of the latter candidates ultimately lost.

When Ferdinand Marcos declared Martial Law in September 1972, Juco actively fought the regime in various ways, but explicitly insisted on a strict policy of nonviolence. She was part of Chino Roces group of oppositionists that informally met at the Taza de Oro restaurant in Ermita, and she worked with journalist Joe Burgos to raise up the Metropolitan Association of College Editors after its predecessor, the College Editors Guild, was shut down when Marcos declared Martial Law.

In 1980 after international pressure forced Marcos to loosen his grip on opposition media, she accepted an invitation to write a column for the English language tabloid WE Forum, titled "Once More with Feeling". She later also wrote a column titled "Woman in the City of Man” for WE Forum's sister broadsheet, Malaya. After the Assassination of Ninoy Aquino in 1983, Juco's antidictatorship work became more aggressive while remaining nonviolent. She joined the nearly weekly street protests that called for Marcos to step down from late 1983 to early 1986. She organized the community of Saint Paul's College to join the protests. She also wrote more aggressively in her newspaper columns. And when Marcos called for snap elections to be held in February 1986, Juco campaigned aggressively for his opponent, Ninoy Aquino's widow Corazon Aquino.

After outrage about widespread cheating during the February 1986 elections led to the People Power Revolution, the eventual ouster and exile of the Marcoses, and the inauguration of Corazon Aquino as president of the Philippines, she was asked to serve as executive director of the National Commission Concerning Disabled Persons (NCCDP; eventually renamed the National Council on Disability Affairs, NCDA).

When a new constitution was promulgated and a new congress elected in 1987, a new system for sectoral representation in the Philippines. Sectoral representatives would be appointed to congress until the 1998 elections, whereupon partylist representatives would be elected via elections. Juco was the first of the Philippines' sectoral representation to be appointed in 1987 as a dual representative for women and for the disabled.

Juco died on July 12, 1989. Since a man was appointed to take over her post as sectoral representative for the disabled, her post as sectoral representative for women remained unfilled.
