= Gerardo P. Cabochan =

Filipino politician (1926–2014)

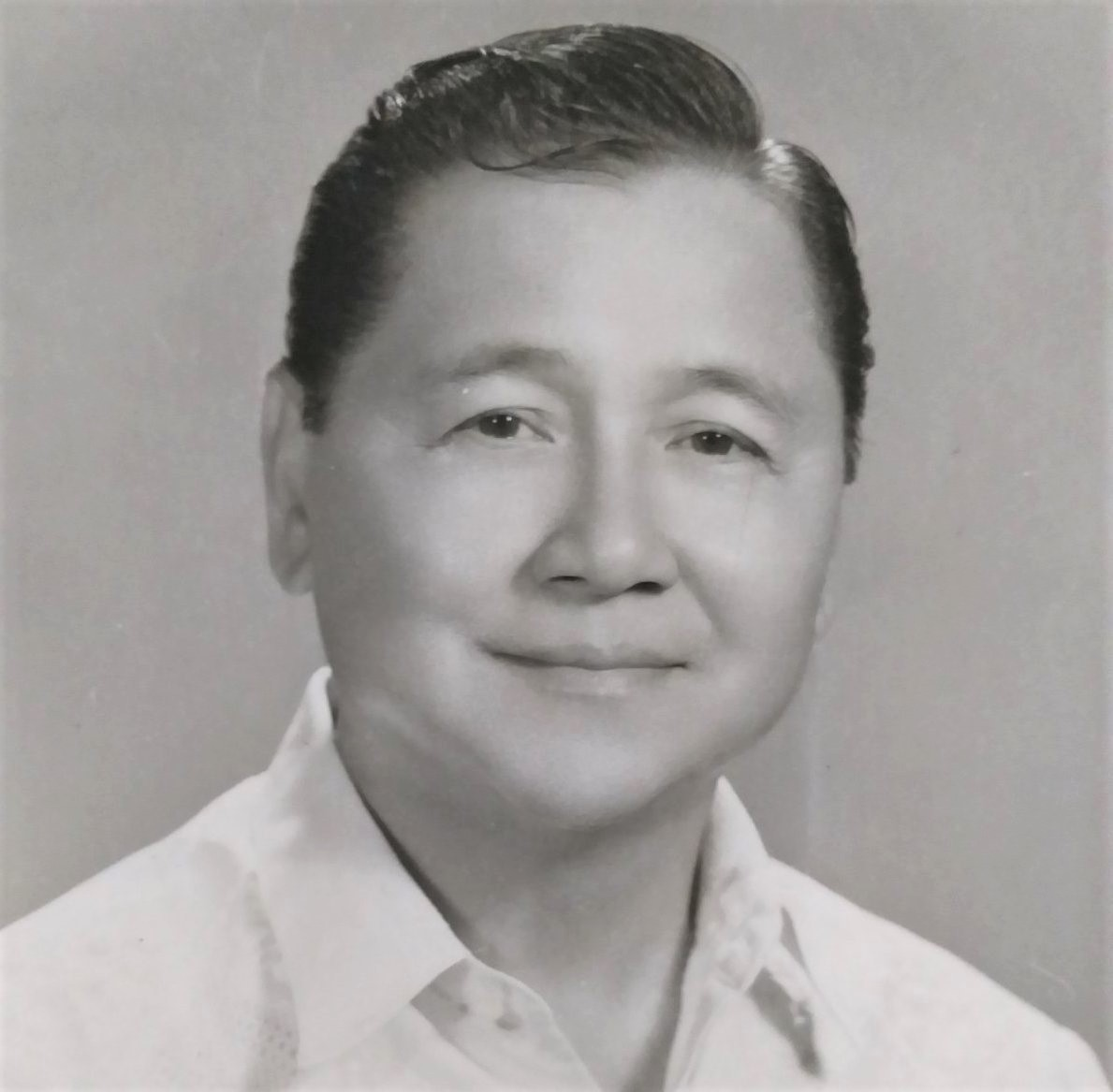

Member of the Philippine House of Representatives from Caloocan's 2nd district
- In office June 30, 1987 – June 30, 1992
- Preceded by: Post established
- Succeeded by: Luis A. Asistio

Personal details
- Born: Gerardo Paulino Cabochan; October 3, 1926 Manila, Philippines
- Died: January 31, 2014 (aged 87)
- Party: PDP–Laban
- Spouse: Clarita Villacorta
- Children: 5
- Education: University of Santo Tomas
- Occupation: Politician, entrepreneur
- Profession: Lawyer
- Website: cabochan.org

Military service
- Allegiance: Philippines
- Branch/service: United States Army Forces in the Far East
- Years of service: 1942-1945
- Rank: First Lieutenant
- Battles/wars: World War II

Gerardo "Gerry" Paulino Cabochan (October 3, 1926 – January 31, 2014) was a Filipino lawyer, soldier, storyteller, and politician who served in the House of Representatives of the Philippines from 1987 to 1992 representing the 2nd district of Caloocan.

== Early life ==
Cabochan was born in Manila on October 3, 1926, to Justo Cabochan of Cabanatuan, an advocate of the societal integration of Filipino-Chinese and Chinese immigrants, and Paula Paulino of San Miguel, Bulacan. At the age of 12, Cabochan became a First Class Boy Scout of the Maria Clara Boy Scouts of Sampaloc in Manila.

=== World War II ===
As a result of the Japanese invasion of the Philippines, his schooling was interrupted and Cabochan decided to serve the military. In August 1942, he was given the rank of First Sergeant in the U.S. Armed Forces in the Far East by Colonel Bernard L. Anderson, the personal representative to the Philippines of General Douglas MacArthur. Cabochan served as Anderson's personal secretary and interpreter in the underground movement in the Sierra Madre mountains. In 1944, he was promoted to First Lieutenant.

During his military stint, Cabochan discovered his talent and love for storytelling. He was able to share his war experiences in a playful manner, like how he was guided by the fireflies when he was lost in the mountains, and how a python wrapped around his waist to prevent his fall from the ravine.

=== Education ===
During the school year of 1947–1948, Cabochan became Cadet Colonel and president of the High School Student Council of Far Eastern University. In addition, he was the president of the Federation of High School Student Councils in Manila. In his college years, Cabochan became vice president of the Central Board of Students of the University of Santo Tomas (UST). He has also often spoken at the UST Radio Station. During the school year of 1948–1949, Cabochan was president of the UST College of Liberal Arts Student Council. He graduated with a Bachelor of Arts from UST in 1952.

== Political and civil careers ==
Cabochan became a lawyer with his general average at the bar exams of 85.95%. Before the results of the bar exams came out, he was hired by, then law professor, former Supreme Court associate justice Jose Feria and former senator Raul Manglapus as First Assistant in their law office. In 1961, Cabochan opened his own law office. As legal counsel, Cabochan has appeared numerous times before the Supreme Court.

=== Congressman ===
The 1987 Philippine Constitution created two districts for Caloocan. The first district was composed of the 70 barangays located north of Epifanio delos Santos Avenue (EDSA), while the second district was composed of 118 barangays located south of EDSA. Cabochan was elected representative of the second congressional district of Caloocan for the 8th Congress of the Philippines, and took his oath of office on October 21, 1987.

During his term of office, Cabochan was considered as the “Conscience of the House”. He was chosen to head a committee investigating a gunrunning case. Cabochan was also noted for his privilege speech at the Batasan for commending the priests of the Oblates of Mary Immaculate in the Philippines. He was able to know the priests and saw their great help to the Filipinos, especially in Mindanao. Cabochan has also co-authored many bills and resolutions, most notably and significant for Caloocan, the Republic Act No. 7550 establishing February 16 annually, as Caloocan City Day, a special non-working holiday in Caloocan.

In addition to legislation, Cabochan also helped the funding of the construction of Caloocan's City Library, the city's Non Formal Education Building, the city's Girl Scout Council Office, and Caloocan City Polytechnic College's conference room and clinic. He was also a member of the Commission on Appointments and the 1992 Philippine presidential election canvassing committee.

Former congressman Reynaldo Umali of Oriental Mindoro's 2nd district used to work for Cabochan as his legislative chief of staff.

=== Civic societies ===
In Caloocan, Cabochan continued his involvement with various civic organizations. He was the first president of the Caloocan City-Malabon-Navotas Chapter of the Integrated Bar of the Philippines from 1973 to 1975. He was also Minister Emeritus of Our Lady of Grace Parish Church in Grace Park. Cabochan also held various high positions for the Lions Club, the Caloocan City Police Trust Fund, the Caloocan City Red Cross, and the Boy Scouts Foundation of the Philippines. In addition, he was also a Chapter Commander of the Knights of Rizal, and delegate to the 1979 Manila Synod of the Catholic Church. Cabochan also held memberships at the Caloocan City Boy Scouts Executive Council and its Peace & Order Council.

=== Business organization ===
Cabochan was a Vice President of the Caloocan City Chamber of Commerce and Industry. He was also the president of CVC Supermarket, which he also owned. From 1979 to 1981, Cabochan was the president of the Philippine Association of Supermarkets. He was also a director of the Rural Bank of Angat in Bulacan.

=== Writing ===
Cabochan has written Isang Pilipino, a book published in 1987, encountering the World War II era and the underground movements during that time.

== Achievements and legacies ==
Cabochan has twice been selected as an Outstanding Citizen of Caloocan. He was also included in the books Outstanding Leaders of the Philippines and One Thousand Leaders, both written by Carlos P. Romulo. Cabochan was also included in the Kagitingan Awards.

=== Gerardo P. Cabochan Prize for Best Book of Short Fiction in Filipino ===
The 'Gerardo P. Cabochan Award for Best Short Fiction in Filipino' is among the National Book Awards presented annually by the Manila Critics' Circle and the National Book Development Board. Due to Cabochan's talent and skill in storytelling, the award was named after him.

==== Awardees ====
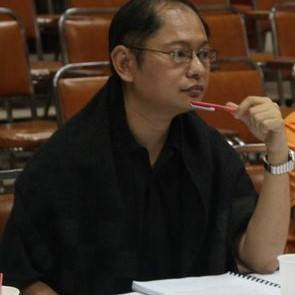
Author Allan N. Derain, winner of the Gerardo P. Cabochan Award for Best Short Fiction in Filipino of the 39th National Book Awards

Award	Title	Author	Publisher
36th National Book Awards	“Sangkatauhan, Sangkahayupan: Mga Kuwento”	Alvin B. Yapan	Ateneo de Manila University Press
37th National Book Awards	“Ang Nawawala”	Chuckberry Pascual	Visprint
38th National Book Awards	“P’wera Bisita”	Emmanuel T. Barrameda	Isang Balangay Media Productions
39th National Book Awards	“The Next Great Tagalog Novel at Iba Pang Kuwento”	Allan N. Derain	University of the Philippines Press

=== Cabochan Foundation ===
The Cabochan Foundation is a non-profit organization inspired by Cabochan's compassion to the poor and works of community development. It conducts series of outreach programs, such as free medical–dental missions and wellness advocacies.

== Personal life and death ==
Cabochan lived in Caloocan, with his wife Clarita Tongco Villacorta of Baliuag, Bulacan. The couple was married on September 3, 1955 and had four children: Jun, Ramon, Carling, and Celia. During the Japanese period, he had a son, Eddy.

The CVC Supermarket in Grace Park, Caloocan was founded by his wife, thus the initials CVC. His eldest son, Jun, established the Pandayan Bookshop, one of the well established bookshops in Luzon. His son Ramon is a doctor, while Carling and Celia are at the helm of their supermarket business.

Cabochan is also the uncle of former congressman Boji Cabochan of the 3rd district of Bulacan.

On July 3, 1991, Cabochan wrote to Jun on the back of a postcard: “Ano ang aking magagawa? Huwag mo sabihin na ikaw ay iisa lamang. Bawat Filipino ay may katungkulang magtanim o mag-alaga ng punong kahoy o halaman. Bawat tao ay may katungkulang maging masipag at matiyaga. Bawat nilalang ay may katungkulang sumunod sa batas, sumamba sa Diyos, magmahal ng kapwa tulad sa sarili. Kapag ito ay iyong ginawa, uunlad ang ating bayan.” (What can I do? Don't say you're alone. Every Filipino has a duty to plant or to take care of a tree or a plant. Every person has a duty to be diligent and to be patient. Every creature has a duty to obey the law, to worship God, and to love one's neighbor as oneself. When you do these, our country will prosper.)

Cabochan died on January 31, 2014 due to cardiac arrest.

== Sources ==
- Modesta G. Boquiren, Caloocan: Yesterday, Today, and Tomorrow - A Reference Material, H.E. Academia Enterprises (2006)
