= Tito Dupaya =

Filipino politician (1922–1989)

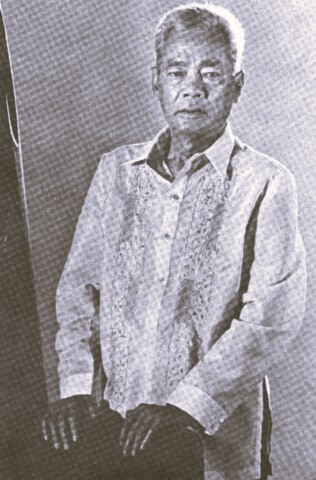
- Dupaya's official portrait during the 8th Congress

Member of the Philippine House of Representatives from Cagayan
- In office June 30, 1987 – April 1, 1989
- Preceded by: District established
- Succeeded by: Francisco Mamba
- Constituency: 3rd district
- In office December 30, 1961 – January 17, 1973
- Preceded by: Felipe Garduque
- Succeeded by: District abolished (seat later held by Domingo Tuzon in 1987)
- Constituency: 1st district

Personal details
- Born: January 1, 1922 Lal-lo, Cagayan, Philippine Islands
- Died: April 1, 1989 (aged 67) San Diego, California, U.S.
- Party: LDP (1988–1989)
- Other political affiliations: LABAN (1987–1988); UNIDO (1984); Liberal (1965–1973); Nacionalista (1961–1965)
- Spouse: Teresa Javier
- Children: 5
- Education: Far Eastern University (BS)

Tito Montilla Dupaya (January 1, 1922 – April 1, 1989) was a Filipino industrialist, businessman, and politician who served as the representative for Cagayan's 3rd congressional district in the Philippine House of Representatives from 1987 to 1992. He previously represented Cagayan's 1st district from 1961 to 1973.

== Early life and education ==
Tito Montilla Dupaya was born on January 1, 1922, in Barrio Catugan, Lal-lo, Cagayan, to Panteleon Dupaya and Nena Montilla. He attended Lal-lo Elementary School for his primary education and Cagayan High School and Cagayan Valley Atheneum for his secondary education. He later earned a Bachelor of Science degree in Foreign Service from Far Eastern University.

== Early career ==
After graduating from college, Dupaya entered business, serving as manager and proprietor of the import-export firm Dupaya Trading, president of the Lal-lo Rural Bank, and proprietor of the Lal-lo Rice Mill, Transportation, and Ice Plant companies. He also worked as a log exporter.

== House of Representatives ==
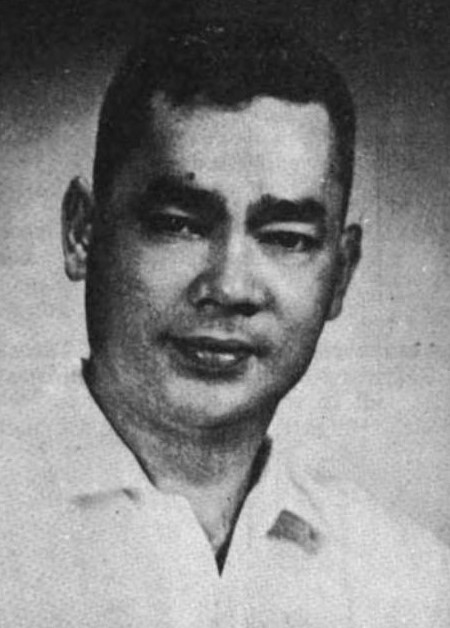
Dupaya's official portrait during the 6th Congress

Dupaya first entered politics in 1961, when he was elected to the House of Representatives, representing Cagayan's 1st congressional district under the Nacionalista Party in the 5th Congress. During his first term, he authored more than 300 bills focused on local development in his constituency, including the establishment of educational institutions, public markets, and health facilities. He was re-elected in 1965 under the Liberal Party. During his second term, he allocated his salary to scholarships for deserving students from his district. During the 6th Congress, he served as chairman of the House Committee on Reparations, vice chairman of the Committee on Public Lands, and a member of six other committees.

In 1969, Dupaya was re-elected to a third term but was unable to complete it following the abolition of Congress in the aftermath of President Ferdinand Marcos's declaration of martial law and the ratification of the 1973 Constitution.

In 1984, Dupaya ran for the Regular Batasang Pambansa under the United Nationalist Democratic Organization, representing Cagayan, but lost.

When Congress was restored in 1987, Dupaya was elected representative of Cagayan's newly created 3rd congressional district. During the 8th Congress, he served as vice chairman of the House Committee on Agriculture and Food.

Dupaya died in office on April 1, 1989, from heart failure.

== Personal life ==
Dupaya was married to Teresa Javier, who served as governor of Cagayan from 1964 to 1980 and in 1987. They had five children.

House of Representatives of the Philippines
New district	Member of the Philippine House of Representatives for Cagayan's 3rd district 1987–1989	Succeeded by Francisco Mamba
Preceded by Felipe Garduque	Member of the Philippine House of Representatives for Cagayan's 1st district 1961–1973	Vacant Martial law and adoption of the 1973 Constitution Title next held by Domingo Tuzon
