= Pedro Romualdo =

Filipino politician

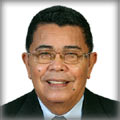
- Official portrait, 2010

Member of the Philippine House of Representatives from Camiguin's Lone District
- In office June 30, 2007 – April 24, 2013
- Preceded by: Jurdin Jesus Romualdo
- Succeeded by: Xavier Jesus Romualdo
- In office June 30, 1987 – June 30, 1998
- Preceded by: Jose Neri
- Succeeded by: Jurdin Jesus Romualdo

Governor of Camiguin
- In office June 30, 1998 – June 30, 2007
- Preceded by: Antonieto Gallardo
- Succeeded by: Jurdin Jesus Romualdo

Personal details
- Born: June 29, 1935 Mambajao, Misamis Oriental, Philippine Islands
- Died: April 24, 2013 (aged 77)
- Party: Lakas–CMD (1995–2013)
- Other political affiliations: LDP (1987–1995); Mindanao Alliance (1984–1987)
- Profession: Politician

Pedro Palarca Romualdo (June 29, 1935 – April 24, 2013) was a Filipino lawyer and politician. He was elected to five terms as a Member of the House of Representatives of the Philippines, representing the Lone District of Camiguin from 1987 to 1998, and from 2007 until his death in 2013. Between his congressional terms, Romualdo was elected governor of Camiguin, serving from 1998 to 2007. At the time of his death, he was a member of the Nationalist People's Coalition.

Preceded by Jose P. Neri	Representative, Lone District of Camiguin; 1987–1998	Succeeded by Jurdin Jesus M. Romualdo
Preceded by Jurdin Jesus M. Romualdo	Representative, Lone District of Camiguin; 2007–2013	Succeeded by Xavier Jesus Romualdo
