= Jose Calingasan =

Filipino politician

Jose Calingasan is a Filipino politician. He was a former member of the House of Representatives representing the 4th District of Batangas. He is also a co-founder of Lakas CMD. He also served as an Ambassador to Bangladesh during the administration of Fidel Ramos.

== Notes ==
House of Representatives of the Philippines
New district	Representative, 4th District of Batangas; 1987–1992	Succeeded by Ralph Recto
