= Zafiro Respicio =

Filipino politician and lawyer

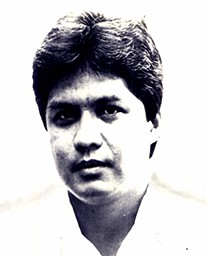
- Respicio in 1986

16th Mayor of Davao City Officer-in-Charge
- In office April 4, 1986 – November 2, 1987
- Vice Mayor: Cornelio Maskariño (April – May 1986); Rodrigo Duterte (May 1986 – 1987)
- Preceded by: Elias B. Lopez
- Succeeded by: Jacinto Rubillar Jr. (OIC)

Commissioner of Immigration and Deportation
- In office June 30, 1992 – August 22, 1994

Member of the Regular Batasang Pambansa from Davao City
- In office June 30, 1984 – March 25, 1986 Serving with Manuel Garcia

Member of the Davao City Council
- In office January 1, 1971 – March 16, 1981

Personal details
- Born: Zafiro Lucas Respicio; August 11, 1947 Makilala, North Cotabato, Philippines
- Died: March 10, 2014 (aged 66) Kidapawan, Cotabato, Philippines
- Party: Independent (1998–2014)
- Other political affiliations: Lakas (1992–1998); PDP–Laban (1982–1992); Mindanao Alliance (1978–1982); Liberal (1971–1978)
- Education: University of Mindanao (BA, LL.B)
- Profession: Lawyer

Zafiro Lucas Respicio (August 11, 1947 – March 10, 2014), also known by his nickname Zaf, was a Filipino politician, lawyer and political activist who served as OIC mayor of Davao City from 1986 to 1987. A former student leader, Respicio was one of the leading opposition figures in Mindanao against the regime of President Ferdinand Marcos.

== Biography ==
=== Early life and career ===
Respicio was born on August 11, 1947, in Makilala, North Cotabato. He studied at the University of Mindanao in Davao City, where he served as president of the student body at the College of Law. He emerged as a prominent student leader and activist who led high-profile student demonstrations against the martial law regime under President Ferdinand Marcos.

In between his college studies, Respicio ran and won as member of the Davao City Council in 1971, easing out Francisco Tesorero in the 14th spot. After obtaining his law degree from the University of Mindanao, Respicio passed the bar exams and was admitted to the practice of law on May 8, 1980. Respicio ran for mayor of Davao City in 1980 under the Mindanao Alliance, running against Mayor Luis Santos of Kilusang Bagong Lipunan, former Mayor Elias B. Lopez of the Nacionalista Party and independent city councilor Victorio Advincula. Respicio placed a close third behind Santos and Lopez, but his failed mayoral bid strengthened his political influence in Davao City.

In February 1982, Respicio co-founded Partido Demokratiko Pilipino with future senator Nene Pimentel. He led the Davao City chapter of PDP, which merged in 1983 with Lakas ng Bayan, founded by opposition leader Ninoy Aquino in 1978, to form PDP–Laban. In the aftermath of Aquino's assassination in 1983, Respicio was elected member of the Regular Batasang Pambansa for Davao City in the 1984 Philippine parliamentary election. In the 1986 snap presidential election, Respicio supported the candidacy of Aquino's widow Corazon, who ran against Marcos under the banner of the United Nationalist Democratic Organization.

=== Mayor of Davao City ===
After the People Power Revolution that overthrew the Marcos regime, Respicio was appointed officer-in-charge mayor of Davao City in March 1986 by President Corazon Aquino. Assistant City Fiscal Rodrigo Duterte, the son of the late Davao Governor Vicente Duterte, was named OIC vice mayor, replacing his mother Soledad who declined the appointment.

During his interim mayorship, Respicio pursued a local development agenda, committed to cleanse the city government of corruption and shady deals. As OIC mayor, he received strong support from the National Assistance to Local Government Units through the reorganized Department of Local Government. In 1986, Respicio united the tribal indigenous festivals in Davao City under the name Apo Duwaling, named after the city's three iconic symbols: the Mount Apo, the Durian fruit, and the waling-waling orchid flower. The Apo Duwaling Festivals was later renamed Kadayawan Festival by his successor, Rodrigo Duterte in 1988.

In 1988, during the first local elections under the 1987 Constitution, Respicio ran for mayor under PDP–Laban with former councilor Dominador Zuño Jr. of UNIDO as his running mate. Respicio was pitted against Duterte, the nominee of Lakas ng Dabaw, and independent radio broadcaster Jun Pala, the leader of the Alsa Masa vigilante group.

Respicio had the full backing and endorsement of President Aquino, DLG Secretary and former mayor Santos and businessman Jesus V. Ayala, while Duterte was supported by pro-Marcos stalwarts in Davao City such as former mayor Lopez, former Assemblyman Manuel Garcia and former senator Alejandro Almendras. Respicio appeared unbeatable with his strong popularity and solid political machinery, with local observers noting Duterte's political obscurity and association with pro-Marcos politicians. Respicio polled strong in the 1st district, while Duterte obtained formidable support in the 2nd and 3rd districts. Duterte ultimately won over Respicio by a narrow margin of 6,000 votes. Respicio protested over the conduct of counting, but the process showed him losing even to Pala, who initially placed third.

=== Post-mayorship ===
Following his defeat to Duterte, Respicio was appointed customs collector at the Ninoy Aquino International Airport by President Aquino in 1989, but he resigned a few months later due to disagreements with airport executives. Santos then recruited him into the Department of Local Government to serve as undersecretary, after which he was appointed Presidential Assistant for Local Governments, serving until 1991. In the 1992 local elections, Respicio ran once again for mayor of Davao City under the newly created Lakas ng EDSA–NUCD, seeking a rematch against Duterte, but ultimately withdrew his bid and was substituted by Councilor Alexis Almendras on the local Lakas–NUCD ticket.

In 1992, Respicio supported the successful presidential bid of former National Defense Secretary Fidel V. Ramos. In recognition for his support, Respicio was appointed by Ramos as Commissioner of the Bureau of Immigration and Deportation. In 1998, he ran for representative of Cotabato's 2nd congressional district under Lakas–NUCD–UMDP, but lost to Gregorio Ipong of Laban ng Makabayang Masang Pilipino.

In August 1994, Respicio was removed from the BID amid his alleged involvement in the case of 11 Indians who, despite faciaing criminal charges for drug trafficking, were allowed to leave the country based on a self-deportation order issued by Respicio and two associate commissioners. Respicio was convicted by the Sandiganbayan in October 2006, sentencing him to 18 years of imprisonment and perpetually disqualifying him from public office. Respicio appealed the case, which was later affirmed by the Supreme Court in June 2011.

=== Illness and death ===
Respicio suffered a heart attack at his home in Makilala, Cotabato on March 10, 2014. He was rushed to a hospital in Kidapawan, where he died at the age of 66. At the time of his death, Respicio was suffering from diabetes and was undergoing dialysis for end-stage kidney failure. He was buried at the Respicio family lot in Makilala.
