= Results of the 1998 Philippine House of Representatives elections =

The following are the results of the 1998 Philippine House of Representatives elections by legislative district.

== Abra ==
Incumbent Jeremias Zapata of Lakas–NUCD–UMDP retired. Lakas–NUCD–UMDP nominated Vicente Ysidro Valera, who won the election.

Candidate	Party	Votes	%
Vicente Ysidro Valera	Lakas–NUCD–UMDP	49,327	62.13
Conrado Balweg	Laban ng Makabayang Masang Pilipino	28,891	36.39
Eustaquio Purugganan	Kilusang Bagong Lipunan	888	1.12
Antonio Borgoña	Independent	154	0.19
Johnny Guinaban	Liberal Party	136	0.17
Total		79,396	100.00
Source: Commission on Elections

== Agusan del Norte ==
=== Agusan del Norte's 1st district ===
Term-limited incumbent Charito Plaza of the Liberal Party ran for the Senate. Leovigildo Banaag of Laban ng Makabayang Masang Pilipino won the election.

Candidate	Party	Votes	%
Leovigildo Banaag	Laban ng Makabayang Masang Pilipino	37,312	40.42
Emmanuel Balanon	Partido para sa Demokratikong Reporma	25,283	27.39
Dolfuss Go	Lakas–NUCD–UMDP	21,359	23.14
Jaime Cembrano Jr.	Independent	8,169	8.85
James Biol	Independent	184	0.20
Total		92,307	100.00
Source: Commission on Elections

=== Agusan del Norte's 2nd district ===
Incumbent Eduardo Rama Sr. of Lakas–NUCD–UMDP ran for a second term, but was defeated by Roan Libarios of Laban ng Makabayang Masang Pilipino.

Candidate	Party	Votes	%
Roan Libarios	Laban ng Makabayang Masang Pilipino	48,623	53.59
Eduardo Rama Sr. (incumbent)	Lakas–NUCD–UMDP	42,029	46.32
Gerardo Quiamjot	Independent	83	0.09
Total		90,735	100.00
Source: Commission on Elections

== Agusan del Sur ==
Incumbent Ceferino Paredes Jr. of Lakas–NUCD–UMDP retired to run for Governor of Agusan del Sur. Lakas–NUCD–UMDP nominated Timoteo Prochina, who was defeated by Alex Bascug of Laban ng Makabayang Masang Pilipino.

Candidate	Party	Votes	%
Alex Bascug	Laban ng Makabayang Masang Pilipino	60,823	41.34
Generoso Sansaet	Independent	40,714	27.67
Timoteo Prochina	Lakas–NUCD–UMDP	35,323	24.01
Tyrone Power Calo	Independent	6,148	4.18
Roberto Calangi	Nacionalista Party	2,259	1.54
Bienvenido Cebuala	Kilusang Bagong Lipunan	1,690	1.15
Roberto Ausmolo	Liberal Party	180	0.12
Total		147,137	100.00
Source: Commission on Elections

== Aklan ==
Incumbent Allan Quimpo of Laban ng Makabayang Masang Pilipino was re-elected to a third term.

Candidate	Party	Votes	%
Allen Quimpo (incumbent)	Laban ng Makabayang Masang Pilipino	101,007	61.26
Corazon Cabagnot	Lakas–NUCD–UMDP	63,867	38.74
Total		164,874	100.00
Source: Commission on Elections

== Albay ==
=== Albay's 1st district ===
Term-limited incumbent Edcel Lagman of Laban ng Makabayang Masang Pilipino (LAMMP) ran for the Senate. The LAMMP nominated Krisel Lagman, who won the election.

Candidate	Party	Votes	%
Krisel Lagman	Laban ng Makabayang Masang Pilipino	59,282	60.86
Antonio Betito	Lakas–NUCD–UMDP	38,064	39.07
Jose Bolo	Independent	69	0.07
Total		97,415	100.00
Source: Commission on Elections

=== Albay's 2nd district ===
Incumbent Carlos R. Imperial of Lakas–NUCD–UMDP was term-limited. Lakas–NUCD–UMDP nominated Norma Imperial, who won the election.

Candidate	Party	Votes	%
Norma Imperial	Lakas–NUCD–UMDP	42,856	34.31
Danilo Azaña	Laban ng Makabayang Masang Pilipino	40,559	32.47
Angelita Ago	Liberal Party	17,643	14.12
Baldo Hernandez	People's Reform Party	13,305	10.65
Manuel Arroyo	Partido para sa Demokratikong Reporma	10,553	8.45
Total		124,916	100.00
Source: Commission on Elections

=== Albay's 3rd district ===
Incumbent Romeo Salalima of Lakas–NUCD–UMDP ran for a second term, but was defeated by Joey Salceda of Laban ng Makabayang Masang Pilipino.

Candidate	Party	Votes	%
Joey Salceda	Laban ng Makabayang Masang Pilipino	64,020	47.87
Romeo Salalima (incumbent)	Lakas–NUCD–UMDP	59,168	44.24
Hermes Ribaya	Partido para sa Demokratikong Reporma	10,553	7.89
Total		133,741	100.00
Source: Commission on Elections

== Antipolo ==
Antipolo's lone district was created on February 13, 1998, from Rizal's 1st district. Victor Sumulong of Lakas–NUCD–UMDP won the election.

Candidate	Party	Votes	%
Victor Sumulong	Lakas–NUCD–UMDP	49,496	46.71
Alfredo Zapanta	Laban ng Makabayang Masang Pilipino	23,374	22.06
Manuel Sanchez	Independent	22,437	21.17
Ernesto Prias	Aksyon Demokratiko	5,374	5.07
George Concepcion	Independent	2,480	2.34
Ricardo Garcia	Independent	751	0.71
Henry Rosantina	Liberal Party	701	0.66
Macario Aggarao	Independent	675	0.64
Nicholas Fontanoza Jr.	Kilusang Bagong Lipunan	430	0.41
Honorio Mutuc Sr.	Independent	257	0.24
Total		105,975	100.00
Source: Commission on Elections

== Antique ==
Term-limited incumbent Exequiel Javier of Lakas–NUCD–UMDP ran for Governor of Antique. Lakas–NUCD–UMDP nominated Jovito Plameras Jr., who won the election.

Candidate	Party	Votes	%
Jovito Plameras Jr.	Lakas–NUCD–UMDP	75,138	51.65
Jose Perpetuo Lotilla	Laban ng Makabayang Masang Pilipino	56,760	39.02
Narzal Mallares	People's Reform Party	13,575	9.33
Total		145,473	100.00
Source: Commission on Elections

== Apayao ==
Apayao's lone district was created on February 14, 1995, from Kalinga-Apayao's lone district. Incumbent Kalinga-Apayao's lone district representative Elias Bulut of Lakas–NUCD–UMDP was re-elected to a third term unopposed.

Candidate	Party	Votes	%
Elias Bulut	Lakas–NUCD–UMDP	23,633	100.00
Total		23,633	100.00
Source: Commission on Elections

== Aurora ==
Incumbent Bella Angara of Laban ng Makabayang Masang Pilipino was re-elected to a second term.

Candidate	Party	Votes	%
Bella Angara (incumbent)	Laban ng Makabayang Masang Pilipino	37,322	62.80
Felix George Miran	Lakas–NUCD–UMDP	22,109	37.20
Total		59,431	100.00
Source: Commission on Elections

== Bacolod ==
Incumbent Romeo Guanzon of Lakas–NUCD–UMDP was term-limited. Lakas–NUCD–UMDP nominated Bacolod City Councilor Renecito Novero, who was defeated by Juan Orola Jr. of Laban ng Makabayang Masang Pilipino.

Candidate	Party	Votes	%
Juan Orola Jr.	Laban ng Makabayang Masang Pilipino	63,660	39.18
Renecito Novero	Lakas–NUCD–UMDP	63,403	39.02
Amado Parreño Jr.	Laban ng Makabayang Masang Pilipino	35,422	21.80
Total		162,485	100.00
Source: Commission on Elections

== Baguio ==
Incumbent Bernardo Vergara of Lakas–NUCD–UMDP was re-elected to a third term.

Candidate	Party	Votes	%
Bernardo Vergara (incumbent)	Lakas–NUCD–UMDP	63,597	73.15
Honorato Aquino	Laban ng Makabayang Masang Pilipino	22,119	25.44
Felipe Ramos	Lapiang Manggagawa	1,220	1.40
Total		86,936	100.00
Source: Commission on Elections

== Basilan ==
Incumbent Candu Muarip of Lakas–NUCD–UMDP retired to run for Governor of Basilan. Lakas–NUCD–UMDP nominated Abdulgani Salapuddin, who won the election.

Candidate	Party	Votes	%
Abdulgani Salapuddin	Lakas–NUCD–UMDP	47,320	55.06
Ibno Turabin	Laban ng Makabayang Masang Pilipino	16,323	18.99
Mario Mamang	Liberal Party	11,211	13.04
Julahon Aslahon	Partido para sa Demokratikong Reporma	8,245	9.59
Wilfredo Furigay	Independent	2,636	3.07
Rodrigo Dulap	Kilusang Bagong Lipunan	213	0.25
Total		85,948	100.00
Source: Commission on Elections

== Bataan ==
=== Bataan's 1st district ===
Incumbent Felicito Payumo of the Liberal Party was term-limited. The Liberal Party nominated Serafin Roman, who was defeated by Antonino Roman of Lakas–NUCD–UMDP.

Candidate	Party	Votes	%
Antonino Roman	Lakas–NUCD–UMDP	48,916	46.08
Serafin Roman	Liberal Party	30,331	28.57
Marlo Zuñiga	Aksyon Demokratiko	14,720	13.87
Efren Moncupa	Partido para sa Demokratikong Reporma	12,181	11.48
Total		106,148	100.00
Source: Commission on Elections

=== Bataan's 2nd district ===
Incumbent Tet Garcia of Lakas–NUCD–UMDP was re-elected to a second term.

Candidate	Party	Votes	%
Tet Garcia (incumbent)	Lakas–NUCD–UMDP	77,942	60.78
Dominador Venegas	Laban ng Makabayang Masang Pilipino	50,164	39.12
Eulogio Alvazar	Independent	124	0.10
Total		128,230	100.00
Source: Commission on Elections

== Batanes ==
Incumbent Florencio Abad of the Liberal Party was re-elected to a second term.

Candidate	Party	Votes	%
Florencio Abad (incumbent)	Liberal Party	4,360	65.44
Telesforo Castillejos	Lakas–NUCD–UMDP	2,303	34.56
Total		6,663	100.00
Source: Commission on Elections

== Batangas ==
=== Batangas' 1st district ===
Incumbent Eduardo Ermita of Lakas–NUCD–UMDP was re-elected to a third term.

Candidate	Party	Votes	%
Eduardo Ermita (incumbent)	Lakas–NUCD–UMDP	87,089	52.41
Rosario Apacible	Laban ng Makabayang Masang Pilipino	77,459	46.62
Benjamin Garcia II	Independent	1,395	0.84
Isidro Ilao	Independent	212	0.13
Total		166,155	100.00
Source: Commission on Elections

=== Batangas' 2nd district ===
Term-limited incumbent Hernando Perez of Lakas–NUCD–UMDP ran for the Senate. Lakas–NUCD–UMDP nominated Edgar Mendoza, who won the election.

Candidate	Party	Votes	%
Edgar Mendoza	Lakas–NUCD–UMDP	57,284	32.52
Geraldine Marie Martinez	Independent	54,870	31.14
Ma. Guia Chavez	Partido para sa Demokratikong Reporma	32,524	18.46
Resty Cabingao	Liberal Party	24,312	13.80
Reynaldo Dimayacyac	Laban ng Makabayang Masang Pilipino	7,187	4.08
Total		176,177	100.00
Source: Commission on Elections

=== Batangas' 3rd district ===
Incumbent Milagros Trinidad of Lakas–NUCD–UMDP was term-limited. Lakas–NUCD–UMDP nominated Jose Macario Laurel IV, who won the election.

Candidate	Party	Votes	%
Jose Laurel IV	Lakas–NUCD–UMDP	87,886	63.67
Nicomedes Hernandez	Liberal Party	50,147	36.33
Total		138,033	100.00
Source: Commission on Elections

=== Batangas' 4th district ===
Incumbent Ralph Recto of Lakas–NUCD–UMDP was re-elected to a third term.

Candidate	Party	Votes	%
Ralph Recto (incumbent)	Lakas–NUCD–UMDP	187,682	90.31
Efren Cordero	Laban ng Makabayang Masang Pilipino	18,120	8.72
Jose Dimayuga	Independent	2,025	0.97
Total		207,827	100.00
Source: Commission on Elections

== Benguet ==
Incumbent Ronald Cosalan of Lakas–NUCD–UMDP was re-elected to a second term.

Candidate	Party	Votes	%
Ronald Cosalan (incumbent)	Lakas–NUCD–UMDP	50,555	44.79
Samuel Dangwa	Laban ng Makabayang Masang Pilipino	40,674	36.03
Jaime Paul Panganiban	Partido para sa Demokratikong Reporma	20,281	17.97
Bial Pelaez	PDP–Laban	1,294	1.15
Bedis Guznian	Lapiang Manggagawa	79	0.07
Total		112,883	100.00
Source: Commission on Elections

== Biliran ==
Incumbent Gerardo Espina Sr. of Lakas–NUCD–UMDP was re-elected to a second term.

Candidate	Party	Votes	%
Gerardo Espina Sr.(incumbent)	Lakas–NUCD–UMDP	28,803	55.26
Ruben Almadro	Lakas–NUCD–UMDP	23,320	44.74
Total		52,123	100.00
Source: Commission on Elections

== Bohol ==
=== Bohol's 1st district ===
Incumbent Venice Agana of Lakas–NUCD–UMDP was term-limited. Lakas–NUCD–UMDP nominated Purita Soliven, who was defeated by Ernesto Herrera of Laban ng Makabayang Masang Pilipino.

Candidate	Party	Votes	%
Ernesto Herrera	Laban ng Makabayang Masang Pilipino	91,842	67.80
Purita Soliven	Lakas–NUCD–UMDP	43,488	32.10
Dionesio Quijaano	Kilusang Bagong Lipunan	75	0.06
Orlando Abitona	Independent	58	0.04
Total		135,463	100.00
Source: Commission on Elections

=== Bohol's 2nd district ===
Incumbent Erico Aumentado of Lakas–NUCD–UMDP was re-elected to a third term.

Candidate	Party	Votes	%
Erico Aumentado (incumbent)	Lakas–NUCD–UMDP	72,242	63.30
David Tirol	Laban ng Makabayang Masang Pilipino	40,323	35.33
Nenita Avenido	Independent	1,083	0.95
Eliezer Nuñez Sr.	Independent	271	0.24
Marcos Auza	Kilusang Bagong Lipunan	192	0.17
Arferando Celocia	Kilusang Bagong Lipunan	20	0.02
Total		114,131	100.00
Source: Commission on Elections

=== Bohol's 3rd district ===
Incumbent Isidro Zarraga of Lakas–NUCD–UMDP was term-limited. Lakas–NUCD–UMDP nominated Jose Flordelis, who was defeated by Eladio Jala of Laban ng Makabayang Masang Pilipino.

Candidate	Party	Votes	%
Eladio Jala	Laban ng Makabayang Masang Pilipino	55,211	41.37
Jose Flordelis	Lakas–NUCD–UMDP	40,693	30.49
Dionisio Balite	Liberal Party	32,220	24.14
Justiniano Bicar	Independent	5,166	3.87
Alvin Quijas	Kilusang Bagong Lipunan	172	0.13
Total		133,462	100.00
Source: Commission on Elections

== Bukidnon ==
=== Bukidnon's 1st district ===
Incumbent Socorro Acosta of the Liberal Party was term-limited. The Liberal Party nominated Nereus Acosta, who won the election.

Candidate	Party	Votes	%
Nereus Acosta	Liberal Party	53,416	60.33
Johnny Albarece	Lakas–NUCD–UMDP	35,129	39.67
Total		88,545	100.00
Source: Commission on Elections

=== Bukidnon's 2nd district ===
Incumbent Reginaldo Tilanduca of Lakas–NUCD–UMDP was re-elected to a third term.

Candidate	Party	Votes	%
Reginaldo Tilanduca (incumbent)	Lakas–NUCD–UMDP	107,941	96.62
Godwin Valdez	Partido para sa Demokratikong Reporma	2,821	2.53
Ruben Unabia	PDP–Laban	956	0.86
Total		111,718	100.00
Source: Commission on Elections

=== Bukidnon's 3rd district ===
Incumbent Jose Maria Zubiri Jr. of Lakas–NUCD–UMDP was term-limited. Lakas–NUCD–UMDP nominated Juan Miguel Zubiri, who won the election.

Candidate	Party	Votes	%
Juan Miguel Zubiri	Lakas–NUCD–UMDP	89,683	81.40
Eusebio Aquino	Laban ng Makabayang Masang Pilipino	14,987	13.60
Oscar Capundag Sr.	PDP–Laban	5,025	4.56
Delia Arroyo	Independent	481	0.44
Total		110,176	100.00
Source: Commission on Elections

== Bulacan ==
=== Bulacan's 1st district ===
The seat was vacant after Teodulo Natividad of Lakas–NUCD–UMDP died on January 9, 1997. Lakas–NUCD–UMDP nominated Wilhelmino Sy-Alvarado, who won the election.

Candidate	Party	Votes	%
Wilhelmino Sy-Alvarado	Lakas–NUCD–UMDP	99,624	50.49
Danny Domingo	Laban ng Makabayang Masang Pilipino	95,446	48.37
Henry Capela	Partido para sa Demokratikong Reporma	1,536	0.78
Jayson Ocampo	Independent	709	0.36
Total		197,315	100.00
Source: Commission on Elections

=== Bulacan's 2nd district ===
Incumbent Pedro Pancho of Lakas–NUCD–UMDP was re-elected to a third term.

Candidate	Party	Votes	%
Pedro Pancho (incumbent)	Lakas–NUCD–UMDP	162,454	86.51
Genaro Reyes	Laban ng Makabayang Masang Pilipino	25,326	13.49
Total		187,780	100.00
Source: Commission on Elections

=== Bulacan's 3rd district ===
Incumbent Ricardo Silverio of Lakas–NUCD–UMDP was re-elected to a third term.

Candidate	Party	Votes	%
Ricardo Silverio (incumbent)	Lakas–NUCD–UMDP	90,451	63.88
Jesus Viceo	Laban ng Makabayang Masang Pilipino	50,469	35.64
Purita Trajano	Liberal Party	683	0.48
Total		141,603	100.00
Source: Commission on Elections

=== Bulacan's 4th district ===
Incumbent Angelito Sarmiento of Lakas–NUCD–UMDP was re-elected to a third term.

Candidate	Party	Votes	%
Angelito Sarmiento (incumbent)	Lakas–NUCD–UMDP	171,422	76.51
Adriano Javier	Laban ng Makabayang Masang Pilipino	50,906	22.72
Zenaida Cecogo	PDP–Laban	665	0.30
Josefina Villanueva	Independent	658	0.29
Constantino de Leon	Kilusang Bagong Lipunan	408	0.18
Total		224,059	100.00
Source: Commission on Elections

== Cagayan ==
=== Cagayan's 1st district ===
Incumbent Patricio Antonio of Partido para sa Demokratikong Reporma (PDR) and Lapiang Manggagawa ran for Governor of Cagayan. The PDR nominated Ernesto Pallingayan, who was defeated by Jack Enrile, an independent.

Candidate	Party	Votes	%
Jack Enrile	Independent	97,214	89.62
Victor Padilla	Independent	9,956	9.18
Eliria Ragasa	Kilusang Bagong Lipunan	856	0.79
Ernesto Pallingayan	Partido para sa Demokratikong Reporma	450	0.41
Total		108,476	100.00
Source: Commission on Elections

=== Cagayan's 2nd district ===
Incumbent Edgar Lara of the Nationalist People's Coalition was re-elected to a third term.

Candidate	Party	Votes	%
Edgar Lara (incumbent)	Nationalist People's Coalition	73,113	89.32
Lazaro Ramos	Independent	6,541	7.99
Perfelito Ancheta	Kilusang Bagong Lipunan	1,167	1.43
Lee Agatep	Independent	791	0.97
Delfin Agcaoili Jr.	People's Reform Party	240	0.29
Total		81,852	100.00
Source: Commission on Elections

=== Cagayan's 3rd district ===
Incumbent Manuel Mamba of Lakas–NUCD–UMDP ran for a second term, but was defeated by Rodolfo Aguinaldo of Lakas–NUCD–UMDP.

Candidate	Party	Votes	%
Rodolfo Aguinaldo	Lakas–NUCD–UMDP	65,058	52.65
Manuel Mamba (incumbent)	Lakas–NUCD–UMDP	58,507	47.35
Total		123,565	100.00
Source: Commission on Elections

== Cagayan de Oro ==
Incumbent Erasmo Damasing of PDP–Laban retired. PDP–Laban nominated Pablo Magtajas and Rodolfo Rocamora, who were both defeated by Constantino Jaraula of Laban ng Makabayang Masang Pilipino.

Candidate	Party	Votes	%
Constantino Jaraula	Laban ng Makabayang Masang Pilipino	87,586	53.42
Pablo Magtajas	PDP–Laban	73,472	44.81
Salvador Salcedo	Kilusang Bagong Lipunan	1,059	0.65
Bert Fuentes	Independent	748	0.46
Rodolfo Rocamora	PDP–Laban	727	0.44
Angelito Marban	Independent	376	0.23
Total		163,968	100.00
Source: Commission on Elections

== Caloocan ==
=== Caloocan's 1st district ===
Incumbent Bobby Guanzon of Lakas–NUCD–UMDP ran for a second term, but was defeated by Recom Echiverri of Lakas–NUCD–UMDP.

Candidate	Party	Votes	%
Recom Echiverri	Lakas–NUCD–UMDP	92,642	41.44
Bobby Guanzon (incumbent)	Lakas–NUCD–UMDP	69,705	31.18
Aurora Henson	Laban ng Makabayang Masang Pilipino	48,605	21.74
Clarita Basaca	Independent	7,200	3.22
Nenita Perez	Kilusang Bagong Lipunan	2,797	1.25
Alexander del Prado	Independent	1,300	0.58
Abraham Henson	Independent	599	0.27
Anser Tomas	Kilusang Bagong Lipunan	518	0.23
Hipolito Paner	None	172	0.08
Total		223,538	100.00
Source: Commission on Elections

=== Caloocan's 2nd district ===
Incumbent Luis Asistio of Laban ng Makabayang Masang Pilipino was re-elected to a third term.

Candidate	Party	Votes	%
Luis Asistio (incumbent)	Laban ng Makabayang Masang Pilipino	76,561	
Gil Calalang	Lakas–NUCD–UMDP		
Leo Nagar	Kilusang Bagong Lipunan		
Julian Palad III	Independent		
Salvador Quimpo	Liberal Party		
Socrates Sotto	Independent		
Total			
Source: Commission on Elections

== Camarines Norte ==
Incumbent Emmanuel Pimentel of the Nationalist People's Coalition retired to run for Governor of Camarines Norte. Roy Padilla Jr. of Laban ng Makabayang Masang Pilipino won the election.

Candidate	Party	Votes	%
Roy Padilla Jr.	Laban ng Makabayang Masang Pilipino	65,933	44.52
Winifredo Oco	Lakas–NUCD–UMDP	58,539	39.53
Serafin Rivera	Aksyon Demokratiko	15,700	10.60
Doroteo Cañeba	Liberal Party	7,932	5.36
Total		148,104	100.00
Source: Commission on Elections

== Camarines Sur ==
=== Camarines Sur's 1st district ===
Term-limited incumbent Rolando Andaya of Lakas–NUCD–UMDP ran for the Senate. Lakas–NUCD–UMDP nominated Rolando Andaya Jr., who won the election.

Candidate	Party	Votes	%
Rolando Andaya Jr.	Lakas–NUCD–UMDP	57,268	58.47
Warren Senar	Laban ng Makabayang Masang Pilipino	22,947	23.43
Roberto Genova	Liberal Party	17,735	18.11
Total		97,950	100.00
Source: Commission on Elections

=== Camarines Sur's 2nd district ===
Incumbent Leopoldo San Buenaventura of Lakas–NUCD–UMDP ran for a second term, but was defeated by Jaime Jacob of Aksyon Demokratiko.

Candidate	Party	Votes	%
Jaime Jacob	Aksyon Demokratiko	43,241	31.11
Celso Baguio	Liberal Party	33,179	23.87
Mariano Jose Villafuerte III	Laban ng Makabayang Masang Pilipino	31,478	22.65
Leopoldo San Buenaventura (incumbent)	Lakas–NUCD–UMDP	30,951	22.27
Emelio Delfin	Independent	146	0.11
Total		138,995	100.00
Source: Commission on Elections

=== Camarines Sur's 3rd district ===
Incumbent Arnulfo Fuentebella of the Nationalist People's Coalition was re-elected to a third term.

Candidate	Party	Votes	%
Arnulfo Fuentebella (incumbent)	Nationalist People's Coalition	68,463	74.55
Gregorio Chavez	Laban ng Makabayang Masang Pilipino	22,608	24.62
Procio Pilapil	Partido para sa Demokratikong Reporma	760	0.83
Total		91,831	100.00
Source: Commission on Elections

=== Camarines Sur's 4th district ===
Term-limited incumbent Ciriaco Alfelor of Lakas–NUCD–UMDP ran for Governor of Camarines Sur. Lakas–NUCD–UMDP nominated Felix Alfelor Jr., who was defeated by Salvio Fortuno of Laban ng Makabayang Masang Pilipino.

Candidate	Party	Votes	%
Salvio Fortuno	Laban ng Makabayang Masang Pilipino	62,007	51.80
Felix Alfelor Jr.	Lakas–NUCD–UMDP	52,741	44.06
Honorato Colico	Independent	4,625	3.86
Cristino Arroyo Jr.	Independent	326	0.27
Total		119,699	100.00
Source: Commission on Elections

== Camiguin ==
Term-limited incumbent Pedro Romualdo of Lakas–NUCD–UMDP ran for Governor of Camiguin. Lakas–NUCD–UMDP nominated Jurdin Jesus Romualdo, who won the election.

Candidate	Party	Votes	%
Jurdin Jesus Romualdo	Lakas–NUCD–UMDP	23,137	59.55
Antonio Gallardo	Laban ng Makabayang Masang Pilipino	15,700	40.41
Eleuterio Zaballero	Kilusang Bagong Lipunan	14	0.04
Total		38,851	100.00
Source: Commission on Elections

== Capiz ==
=== Capiz' 1st district ===
Incumbent Mar Roxas of the Liberal Party was re-elected to a second term.

Candidate	Party	Votes	%
Mar Roxas (incumbent)	Liberal Party	78,844	62.84
Jose Avelino III	Lakas–NUCD–UMDP	46,627	37.16
Total		125,471	100.00
Source: Commission on Elections

=== Capiz' 2nd district ===
Incumbent Vicente Andaya Jr. of Lakas–NUCD–UMDP was re-elected to a third term.

Candidate	Party	Votes	%
Vicente Andaya Jr. (incumbent)	Lakas–NUCD–UMDP	82,467	83.83
Eduardo Valentine Berganio	Lakas–NUCD–UMDP	10,880	11.06
Rolando Bayot	Laban ng Makabayang Masang Pilipino	5,028	5.11
Total		98,375	100.00
Source: Commission on Elections

== Catanduanes ==
Incumbent Leandro Verceles Jr. of Lakas–NUCD–UMDP was re-elected to a third term.

Candidate	Party	Votes	%
Leandro Verceles Jr. (incumbent)	Lakas–NUCD–UMDP	43,944	61.55
Armando Lizaso	Partido para sa Demokratikong Reporma	19,115	26.77
Rosalie Estacio	Independent	7,929	11.11
Manuel Tablizo Jr.	Independent	266	0.37
Luis Sorreta	Independent	143	0.20
Total		71,397	100.00
Source: Commission on Elections

== Cavite ==
=== Cavite's 1st district ===
Incumbent Plaridel Abaya of the Nationalist People's Coalition was re-elected to a second term.

Candidate	Party	Votes	%
Plaridel Abaya (incumbent)	Nationalist People's Coalition	128,497	64.47
Dominador Nazareno Jr.	Lakas–NUCD–UMDP	44,691	22.42
Manuel Eduardo Lunas	Partido para sa Demokratikong Reporma	25,218	12.65
German Bay	PDP–Laban	898	0.45
Total		199,304	100.00
Source: Commission on Elections

=== Cavite's 2nd district ===
Term-limited incumbent Renato Dragon of Laban ng Makabayang Masang Pilipino (LAMMP) ran for Governor of Cavite. The LAMMP nominated Ayong Maliksi, who won the election.

Candidate	Party	Votes	%
Ayong Maliksi	Laban ng Makabayang Masang Pilipino	192,090	68.37
Fernando Campos	Lakas–NUCD–UMDP	85,401	30.39
Alvin Recto	Independent	2,350	0.84
Rodrigo Cantada	PDP–Laban	1,133	0.40
Total		280,974	100.00
Source: Commission on Elections

=== Cavite's 3rd district ===
Incumbent Telesforo Unas of Lakas–NUCD–UMDP retired. Lakas–NUCD–UMDP nominated Conrado Yuvienco, who was defeated by Napoleon Beratio of Laban ng Makabayang Masang Pilipino.

Candidate	Party	Votes	%
Napoleon Beratio	Laban ng Makabayang Masang Pilipino	69,146	40.93
Jose Marcel Panlilio	Liberal Party	49,511	29.31
Raymundo Beltran	Independent	18,890	11.18
Conrado Yuvienco	Lakas–NUCD–UMDP	16,635	9.85
Nathaniel Anarna	PROMDI	7,042	4.17
Nestor Medina	Partido para sa Demokratikong Reporma	6,095	3.61
Nathaniel Bendo	Independent	1,249	0.74
Benedicto Corpuz	PDP–Laban	297	0.18
Emeterio Palabrica	PDP–Laban	84	0.05
Total		168,949	100.00
Source: Commission on Elections

== Cebu ==
=== Cebu's 1st district ===
Incumbent Eduardo Gullas of PROMDI was re-elected to a third term.

Candidate	Party	Votes	%
Eduardo Gullas (incumbent)	PROMDI	129,050	82.02
David Odilao Jr.	Lakas–NUCD–UMDP	27,457	17.45
Clarence Paul Oaminal	Liberal Party	837	0.53
Total		157,344	100.00
Source: Commission on Elections

=== Cebu's 2nd district ===
Incumbent Crisologo Abines of PROMDI was term-limited. PROMDI nominated Priscilla Abines, who was defeated by Simeon Kintanar of Lakas–NUCD–UMDP.

Candidate	Party	Votes	%
Simeon Kintanar	Lakas–NUCD–UMDP	68,263	54.14
Priscilla Abines	PROMDI	51,966	41.21
Oliveros Kintanar	Laban ng Makabayang Masang Pilipino	3,598	2.85
Lucy Abines	Independent	1,622	1.29
Juan Castro	Lakas–NUCD–UMDP	522	0.41
Tomas Dueñas	Independent	122	0.10
Total		126,093	100.00
Source: Commission on Elections

=== Cebu's 3rd district ===
Incumbent John Henry Osmeña of the Nationalist People's Coalition retired to run for the Senate. Antonio Yapha Jr. of Laban ng Makabayang Masang Pilipino won the election.

Candidate	Party	Votes	%
Antonio Yapha Jr.	Laban ng Makabayang Masang Pilipino	70,529	55.22
Alex Binghay	PROMDI	57,023	44.65
Manuel Evangelista	Lakas–NUCD–UMDP	171	0.13
Total		127,723	100.00
Source: Commission on Elections

=== Cebu's 4th district ===
Incumbent Celestino Martinez Jr. of PROMDI was term-limited. PROMDI nominated Clavel Martinez, who won the election

Candidate	Party	Votes	%
Clavel Martinez	PROMDI	73,406	60.06
Benhur Salimbangon	Lakas–NUCD–UMDP	48,390	39.59
Bonifacio Charito Suson	Liberal Party	419	0.34
Total		122,215	100.00
Source: Commission on Elections

=== Cebu's 5th district ===
Incumbent Ramon Durano III of Lakas–NUCD–UMDP was term-limited. Lakas–NUCD–UMDP nominated Ace Durano, who won the election.

Candidate	Party	Votes	%
Ace Durano	Lakas–NUCD–UMDP	117,464	97.27
Adonis Montecillo	Liberal Party	3,299	2.73
Total		120,763	100.00
Source: Commission on Elections

=== Cebu's 6th district ===
Incumbent Nerissa Soon-Ruiz of Lakas–NUCD–UMDP retired. Lakas–NUCD–UMDP nominated Efren Herrera, who won the election.

Candidate	Party	Votes	%
Efren Herrera	Lakas–NUCD–UMDP	54,791	29.78
Paterno Cañete	Liberal Party	36,945	20.08
Silvino Maceren	Partido para sa Demokratikong Reporma	30,124	16.37
Federico Mercado	PROMDI	30,011	16.31
Emmanuel Pepito	Laban ng Makabayang Masang Pilipino	28,742	15.62
Vito Miñora	Independent	3,398	1.85
Total		184,011	100.00
Source: Commission on Elections

== Cebu City ==
=== Cebu City's 1st district ===
Incumbent Raul del Mar of PROMDI was term-limited. PROMDI nominated Raoul del Mar, who won the election.

Candidate	Party	Votes	%
Raoul del Mar	PROMDI	202,648	61.51
Avenescio Piramide	Lakas–NUCD–UMDP	82,654	25.09
Danilo Deen	Laban ng Makabayang Masang Pilipino	43,260	13.13
Jesus Labrador	Kilusang Bagong Lipunan	877	0.27
Total		329,439	100.00
Source: Commission on Elections

=== Cebu City's 2nd district ===
Incumbent Antonio Cuenco of PROMDI was term-limited. PROMDI nominated Nancy Cuenco, who won the election.

Candidate	Party	Votes	%
Nancy Cuenco	PROMDI	163,413	50.71
Rico Rey Francis Holganza	Lakas–NUCD–UMDP	150,404	46.67
Nicolen Aricayos	Laban ng Makabayang Masang Pilipino	5,810	1.80
Virgilio Abadilla	Independent	2,239	0.69
Manolito Langub	Kilusang Bagong Lipunan	411	0.13
Total		322,277	100.00
Source: Commission on Elections

== Compostela Valley ==
=== Compostela Valley's 1st district ===
Compostela Valley's 1st district was created on January 30, 1998, from Davao del Norte's 1st district. Incumbent Davao del Norte's 1st district representative Rogelio Sarmiento of Lakas–NUCD–UMDP was re-elected to a third term.

Candidate	Party	Votes	%
Rogelio Sarmiento	Lakas–NUCD–UMDP	42,234	53.34
Florante Garcia	Laban ng Makabayang Masang Pilipino	35,452	44.78
Netz Varona	Liberal Party	1,486	1.88
Total		79,172	100.00
Source: Commission on Elections

=== Compostela Valley's 2nd district ===
Compostela Valley's 2nd district was created on January 30, 1998, from Davao del Norte's 2nd district. Prospero Amatong of Lakas–NUCD–UMDP won the election.

Candidate	Party	Votes	%
Prospero Amatong	Lakas–NUCD–UMDP	74,919	82.85
Ruperto Garcia	Partido para sa Demokratikong Reporma	14,302	15.82
Victor Bunag Sr.	PDP–Laban	1,203	1.33
Total		90,424	100.00
Source: Commission on Elections

== Cotabato ==
=== Cotabato's 1st district ===
Incumbent Anthony Dequiña of Lakas–NUCD–UMDP was re-elected to a third term.

Candidate	Party	Votes	%
Anthony Dequiña (incumbent)	Lakas–NUCD–UMDP	68,203	47.62
Rosario Diaz	Lakas–NUCD–UMDP	60,870	42.50
Musib Buat	Laban ng Makabayang Masang Pilipino	14,146	9.88
Total		143,219	100.00
Source: Commission on Elections

=== Cotabato's 2nd district ===
Term-limited incumbent Gregorio Andolana of Lakas–NUCD–UMDP ran for Governor of Cotabato. Lakas–NUCD–UMDP nominated Zafiro Respicio and Wilfredo Jalipa, who were both defeated by Gregorio Ipong of Laban ng Makabayang Masang Pilipino.

Candidate	Party	Votes	%
Gregorio Ipong	Laban ng Makabayang Masang Pilipino	42,049	28.67
Zafiro Respicio	Lakas–NUCD–UMDP	27,818	18.97
Wilfredo Jalipa	Lakas–NUCD–UMDP	26,090	17.79
Mario Calayco	PROMDI	22,820	15.56
Alfredo Epiz	Partido para sa Demokratikong Reporma	20,399	13.91
Rene Roldan	Liberal Party	7,471	5.09
Total		146,647	100.00
Source: Commission on Elections

== Davao City ==
=== Davao City's 1st district ===
Incumbent Prospero Nograles of Lakas–NUCD–UMDP retired to run for Mayor of Davao City. Lakas–NUCD–UMDP nominated Bonifacio Militar, who was defeated by Rodrigo Duterte of Laban ng Makabayang Masang Pilipino.

Candidate	Party	Votes	%
Rodrigo Duterte	Laban ng Makabayang Masang Pilipino	123,069	73.53
Bonifacio Militar	Lakas–NUCD–UMDP	41,943	25.06
Emmanuel Duterte	People's Reform Party	1,255	0.75
Luis Moran	PDP–Laban	832	0.50
Hipolito Sapero	Kilusang Bagong Lipunan	159	0.09
Paul Sapsal	Kilusang Bagong Lipunan	69	0.04
Florencio Cabalfin Jr.	Kilusang Bagong Lipunan	43	0.03
Total		167,370	100.00
Source: Commission on Elections

=== Davao City's 2nd district ===
Incumbent Manuel Garcia of Lakas–NUCD–UMDP was re-elected to a third term.

Candidate	Party	Votes	%
Manuel Garcia (incumbent)	Lakas–NUCD–UMDP	77,609	55.93
Danilo Dayanghirang	Partido para sa Demokratikong Reporma	59,885	43.16
Manuel Velasco	PDP–Laban	684	0.49
Jorge Ibanez Jr.	Independent	304	0.22
Candido Amaro	Kilusang Bagong Lipunan	267	0.19
Total		138,749	100.00
Source: Commission on Elections

=== Davao City's 3rd district ===
Incumbent Elias Lopez of Laban ng Makabayang Masang Pilipino was re-elected to a third term.

Candidate	Party	Votes	%
Elias Lopez (incumbent)	Laban ng Makabayang Masang Pilipino	62,810	61.60
Sonja Rodriguez	Lakas–NUCD–UMDP	19,144	18.78
Frances Robillo	Partido para sa Demokratikong Reporma	17,369	17.03
Alejandro Dayot Jr.	Kilusang Bagong Lipunan	2,640	2.59
Total		101,963	100.00
Source: Commission on Elections

== Davao del Norte ==
=== Davao del Norte's 1st district ===
Incumbent Rogelio Sarmiento of Lakas–NUCD–UMDP ran for a third term in Compostela Valley's 1st district. Lakas–NUCD–UMDP nominated Pedro San Jose, who was defeated by Pantaleon Alvarez of Partido para sa Demokratikong Reporma.

Candidate	Party	Votes	%
Pantaleon Alvarez	Partido para sa Demokratikong Reporma	45,376	39.20
Shirley Aala	Laban ng Makabayang Masang Pilipino	38,933	33.63
Pedro San Jose	Lakas–NUCD–UMDP	31,453	27.17
Total		115,762	100.00
Source: Commission on Elections

=== Davao del Norte's 2nd district ===
Incumbent Baltazar Sator of Lakas–NUCD–UMDP was term-limited. Lakas–NUCD–UMDP nominated Antonio Floirendo Jr., who won the election.

Candidate	Party	Votes	%
Antonio Floirendo Jr.	Lakas–NUCD–UMDP	54,480	49.36
Winstor Villanueva	Independent	31,074	28.15
Pedro Durano	Partido para sa Demokratikong Reporma	22,343	20.24
Eli Barrido	Liberal Party	1,221	1.11
Remedios Escalera	PDP–Laban	1,042	0.94
Teodora Pagas	PDP–Laban	213	0.19
Romel Valiente	Partido para sa Demokratikong Reporma	7	0.01
Total		110,380	100.00
Source: Commission on Elections

== Davao del Sur ==
=== Davao del Sur's 1st district ===
Incumbent Alejandro Almendras Jr. of Lakas–NUCD–UMDP ran for a second term, but was defeated by Douglas Cagas of Partido para sa Demokratikong Reporma.

Candidate	Party	Votes	%
Douglas Cagas	Partido para sa Demokratikong Reporma	57,323	40.70
Pablo Villaber	Laban ng Makabayang Masang Pilipino	42,097	29.89
Alejandro Almendras Jr. (incumbent)	Lakas–NUCD–UMDP	40,979	29.10
Desiderio Caballero	PDP–Laban	432	0.31
Total		140,831	100.00
Source: Commission on Elections

=== Davao del Sur's 2nd district ===
Incumbent Benjamin Bautista Sr. of Lakas–NUCD–UMDP retired. Lakas–NUCD–UMDP nominated Franklin Bautista, who won the election unopposed.

Candidate	Party	Votes	%
Franklin Bautista	Lakas–NUCD–UMDP	65,944	100.00
Total		65,944	100.00
Source: Commission on Elections

== Davao Oriental ==
=== Davao Oriental's 1st district ===
Incumbent Maria Elena Palma Gil of Lakas–NUCD–UMDP was re-elected to a third term.

Candidate	Party	Votes	%
Maria Elena Palma Gil (incumbent)	Lakas–NUCD–UMDP	41,174	87.98
Elmo Dayanghirang	Partido para sa Demokratikong Reporma	4,762	10.18
Ortillano Tan	Bago	864	1.85
Total		46,800	100.00
Source: Commission on Elections

=== Davao Oriental's 2nd district ===
Incumbent Thelma Almario of Lakas–NUCD–UMDP was term-limited. Lakas–NUCD–UMDP nominated Joel Mayo Almario, who won the election.

Candidate	Party	Votes	%
Joel Mayo Almario	Lakas–NUCD–UMDP	35,990	39.96
Florinda Isabel Rabat	Laban ng Makabayang Masang Pilipino	30,444	33.80
Antonio Alcantara	Partido para sa Demokratikong Reporma	11,871	13.18
Adolfo Angala	Laban ng Makabayang Masang Pilipino	4,386	4.87
Amado Arciaga	Independent	3,877	4.30
Erlinda Irigo	Liberal Party	3,494	3.88
Total		90,062	100.00
Source: Commission on Elections

== Eastern Samar ==
Term-limited incumbent Jose Ramirez of Lakas–NUCD–UMDP ran for Governor of Eastern Samar. Lakas–NUCD–UMDP nominated Cornelio Sison, who was defeated by Marcelino Libanan of Laban ng Makabayang Masang Pilipino.

Candidate	Party	Votes	%
Marcelino Libanan	Laban ng Makabayang Masang Pilipino	44,690	37.01
Cornelio Sison	Lakas–NUCD–UMDP	42,211	34.96
Lutgardo Barbo	Liberal Party	32,203	26.67
Agustin Docena	Nationalist People's Coalition	1,406	1.16
Victor Lovely Jr.	Aksyon Demokratiko	242	0.20
Total		120,752	100.00
Source: Commission on Elections

== Guimaras ==
The seat was vacant after Catalino Nava of Lakas–NUCD–UMDP died on December 3, 1995. Lakas–NUCD–UMDP nominated Imelda Lopez, who won the election.

Candidate	Party	Votes	%
Imelda Lopez	Lakas–NUCD–UMDP	31,924	66.39
Vicente de Asis	Laban ng Makabayang Masang Pilipino	16,165	33.61
Total		48,089	100.00
Source: Commission on Elections

== Ifugao ==
Incumbent Benjamin Cappleman of Laban ng Makabayang Masang Pilipino was re-elected to a third term.

Candidate	Party	Votes	%
Benjamin Cappleman (incumbent)	Laban ng Makabayang Masang Pilipino	33,187	60.81
Denis Habawel	Lakas–NUCD–UMDP	21,384	39.19
Total		54,571	100.00
Source: Commission on Elections

== Ilocos Norte ==
=== Ilocos Norte's 1st district ===
Term-limited incumbent Roque Ablan Jr. of Lakas–NUCD–UMDP ran for Governor of Ilocos Norte. Lakas–NUCD–UMDP nominated Guillermo Ruiz, who was defeated by Rodolfo Fariñas, an independent.

Candidate	Party	Votes	%
Rodolfo Fariñas	Independent	56,369	53.53
Guillermo Ruiz	Lakas–NUCD–UMDP	46,072	43.75
Arnold Guerrero	Independent	2,861	2.72
Total		105,302	100.00
Source: Commission on Elections

=== Ilocos Norte's 2nd district ===
Incumbent Simeon Valdez of Lakas–NUCD–UMDP ran for a second term, but was defeated by Imee Marcos of Kilusang Bagong Lipunan.

Candidate	Party	Votes	%
Imee Marcos	Kilusang Bagong Lipunan	65,733	64.00
Simeon Valdez (incumbent)	Lakas–NUCD–UMDP	21,065	20.51
Jesus Nalupta	Nationalist People's Coalition	15,909	15.49
Total		102,707	100.00
Source: Commission on Elections

== Ilocos Sur ==
=== Ilocos Sur's 1st district ===
Incumbent Mariano Tajon of Lakas–NUCD–UMDP ran for a third term, but was defeated by Salacnib Baterina of Laban ng Makabayang Masang Pilipino.

Candidate	Party	Votes	%
Salacnib Baterina	Laban ng Makabayang Masang Pilipino	51,103	52.15
Mariano Tajon	Lakas–NUCD–UMDP	46,882	47.85
Total		97,985	100.00
Source: Commission on Elections

=== Ilocos Sur's 2nd district ===
Term-limited incumbent Eric Singson of Lakas–NUCD–UMDP ran for Governor of Ilocos Sur. Lakas–NUCD–UMDP nominated Grace Singson, who won the election.

Candidate	Party	Votes	%
Grace Singson	Lakas–NUCD–UMDP	66,125	50.68
Virgilio Valle	Laban ng Makabayang Masang Pilipino	64,338	49.32
Total		130,463	100.00
Source: Commission on Elections

== Iloilo ==
=== Iloilo's 1st district ===
Incumbent Oscar Garin of Lakas–NUCD–UMDP was term-limited. Lakas–NUCD–UMDP nominated Ninfa Garin, who won the election, and Jaime Torres.

Candidate	Party	Votes	%
Ninfa Garin	Lakas–NUCD–UMDP	60,851	50.37
Jaime Torres	Lakas–NUCD–UMDP	59,447	49.21
Rodolfo Legaspi	Liberal Party	506	0.42
Total		120,804	100.00
Source: Commission on Elections

=== Iloilo's 2nd district ===
Incumbent Alberto Lopez of Lakas–NUCD–UMDP was term-limited. Lakas–NUCD–UMDP nominated Augusto Syjuco Jr., who won the election.

Candidate	Party	Votes	%
Augusto Syjuco Jr.	Lakas–NUCD–UMDP	56,773	56.47
Joemari Gerochi	Laban ng Makabayang Masang Pilipino	43,768	43.53
Total		100,541	100.00
Source: Commission on Elections

=== Iloilo's 3rd district ===
Incumbent Licurgo Tirador of Lakas–NUCD–UMDP was term-limited. Lakas–NUCD–UMDP nominated Pototan Mayor Manuel Parcon, who won the election.

Candidate	Party	Votes	%
Manuel Parcon	Lakas–NUCD–UMDP	71,810	61.32
Robert Maroma	Laban ng Makabayang Masang Pilipino	42,888	36.63
Cipriano Peñaflorida	Liberal Party	2,172	1.85
Nolbert Gil	Independent	228	0.19
Total		117,098	100.00
Source: Commission on Elections

=== Iloilo's 4th district ===
Incumbent Narciso Monfort of Lakas–NUCD–UMDP was re-elected to a second term.

Candidate	Party	Votes	%
Narciso Monfort (incumbent)	Lakas–NUCD–UMDP	77,585	68.12
Pablito Araneta	Partido para sa Demokratikong Reporma	27,122	23.81
Douglas Edwin del Rosario	Laban ng Makabayang Masang Pilipino	9,181	8.06
Total		113,888	100.00
Source: Commission on Elections

=== Iloilo's 5th district ===
Term-limited incumbent Niel Tupas Sr. of Lakas–NUCD–UMDP ran for Governor of Iloilo. Lakas–NUCD–UMDP nominated Elizabeth Salcedo, who was defeated by 5th District Board Member Rolex Suplico of Laban ng Makabayang Masang Pilipino.

Candidate	Party	Votes	%
Rolex Suplico	Laban ng Makabayang Masang Pilipino	60,204	72.21
Elizabeth Salcedo	Lakas–NUCD–UMDP	21,668	25.99
Arturo Augustus Ariola	Liberal Party	1,502	1.80
Total		83,374	100.00
Source: Commission on Elections

== Iloilo City ==
Incumbent Raul M. Gonzalez of Lakas–NUCD–UMDP was re-elected to a second term.

Candidate	Party	Votes	%
Raul M. Gonzalez (incumbent)	Lakas–NUCD–UMDP	57,711	38.83
Rafael Lopez Vito	Independent	49,880	33.56
Salvador Britanico	Laban ng Makabayang Masang Pilipino	39,916	26.86
Pascual Espinosa Jr.	Independent	721	0.49
Pedro Prias	PDP–Laban	400	0.27
Total		148,628	100.00
Source: Commission on Elections

== Isabela ==
=== Isabela's 1st district ===
Incumbent Rodolfo Albano Jr. of Lakas–NUCD–UMDP was term-limited. Lakas–NUCD–UMDP nominated Rodolfo Albano III, who won the election.

Candidate	Party	Votes	%
Rodolfo Albano III	Lakas–NUCD–UMDP	67,139	66.75
Jose Gangan	Laban ng Makabayang Masang Pilipino	33,446	33.25
Total		100,585	100.00
Source: Commission on Elections

=== Isabela's 2nd district ===
Incumbent Faustino Dy Jr. of Lakas–NUCD–UMDP was re-elected to a third term.

Candidate	Party	Votes	%
Faustino Dy Jr. (incumbent)	Lakas–NUCD–UMDP	88,148	97.29
Luciano Lactao Sr.	Liberal Party	2,455	2.71
Total		90,603	100.00
Source: Commission on Elections

=== Isabela's 3rd district ===
Incumbent Santiago Respicio of Lakas–NUCD–UMDP was term-limited. Lakas–NUCD–UMDP nominated Ramon Reyes, who won the election.

Candidate	Party	Votes	%
Ramon Reyes	Lakas–NUCD–UMDP	48,729	45.10
Dionisio Bala Jr.	Laban ng Makabayang Masang Pilipino	30,663	28.38
Bartolome Mallillin	Liberal Party	28,645	26.51
Total		108,037	100.00
Source: Commission on Elections

=== Isabela's 4th district ===
Incumbent Antonio Abaya of the Nationalist People's Coalition was term-limited. Heherson Alvarez of Lakas–NUCD–UMDP won the election.

Candidate	Party	Votes	%
Heherson Alvarez	Lakas–NUCD–UMDP	61,801	56.16
Jolly Silverio	Laban ng Makabayang Masang Pilipino	47,603	43.26
Leo Nelmida	Independent	643	0.58
Total		110,047	100.00
Source: Commission on Elections

== Kalinga ==
Kalinga's lone district was created on May 8, 1995, from Kalinga-Apayao's lone district. Lawrence Wacnang of Lakas–NUCD–UMDP won the election.

Candidate	Party	Votes	%
Lawrence Wacnang	Lakas–NUCD–UMDP	27,648	44.76
Macario Duguiang	Laban ng Makabayang Masang Pilipino	21,644	35.04
Warren Luyaben	Kilusang Bagong Lipunan	12,328	19.96
Mencio Sapitan	PDP–Laban	147	0.24
Total		61,767	100.00
Source: Commission on Elections

== La Union ==
=== La Union's 1st district ===
Incumbent Victor Ortega of Lakas–NUCD–UMDP was term-limited. Lakas–NUCD–UMDP nominated Manuel Ortega, who won the election.

Candidate	Party	Votes	%
Manuel Ortega	Lakas–NUCD–UMDP	67,377	53.40
Casiano Ledda	Laban ng Makabayang Masang Pilipino	57,399	45.49
Fernando Gallardo Sr.	Liberal Party	1,398	1.11
Total		126,174	100.00
Source: Commission on Elections

=== La Union's 2nd district ===
Term-limited incumbent Jose Aspiras of Laban ng Makabayang Masang Pilipino (LAMMP) ran for Governor of La Union. The LAMMP nominated Tomas Dumpit, who won the election.

Candidate	Party	Votes	%
Tomas Dumpit	Laban ng Makabayang Masang Pilipino	47,692	35.22
Franco Rimando	Lakas–NUCD–UMDP	29,100	21.49
William Russell Sobrepeña	Lakas–NUCD–UMDP	24,981	18.45
Pablo Olarte	Nationalist People's Coalition	18,544	13.69
Dioscoro Yoro Jr.	Liberal Party	15,109	11.16
Total		135,426	100.00
Source: Commission on Elections

== Laguna ==
=== Laguna's 1st district ===
Incumbent Nereo Joaquin of Laban ng Makabayang Masang Pilipino (LAMMP) retired. The LAMMP nominated Uliran Joaquin, who won the election.

Candidate	Party	Votes	%
Uliran Joaquin	Laban ng Makabayang Masang Pilipino	111,659	56.01
Calixto Cataquiz	Lakas–NUCD–UMDP	77,736	38.99
Reynaldo Cardeno	Partido para sa Demokratikong Reporma	8,569	4.30
Jacinto Lappay	PDP–Laban	1,396	0.70
Total		199,360	100.00
Source: Commission on Elections

=== Laguna's 2nd district ===
Incumbent Jun Chipeco of Lakas–NUCD–UMDP was re-elected to a second term.

Candidate	Party	Votes	%
Jun Chipeco (incumbent)	Lakas–NUCD–UMDP	91,750	51.45
Rodolfo Tingzon Sr.	Lakas–NUCD–UMDP	86,581	48.55
Total		178,331	100.00
Source: Commission on Elections

=== Laguna's 3rd district ===
Term-limited incumbent Florante Aquino of Lakas–NUCD–UMDP ran for Governor of Laguna. Lakas–NUCD–UMDP nominated Dolores Potenciano, who was defeated by Danton Bueser of the Liberal Party.

Candidate	Party	Votes	%
Danton Bueser	Liberal Party	51,830	32.24
Dolores Potenciano	Lakas–NUCD–UMDP	46,236	28.76
Cesar Dizon	Laban ng Makabayang Masang Pilipino	34,508	21.46
Najie Gapangada	Partido para sa Demokratikong Reporma	24,467	15.22
Conrado Manicad	PROMDI	3,746	2.33
Total		160,787	100.00
Source: Commission on Elections

=== Laguna's 4th district ===
The seat was vacant after Magdaleno Palacol Sr. of Lakas–NUCD–UMDP died on August 21, 1997. Lakas–NUCD–UMDP nominated Erwin Maceda, who was defeated by Rodolfo San Luis of Laban ng Makabayang Masang Pilipino.

Candidate	Party	Votes	%
Rodolfo San Luis	Laban ng Makabayang Masang Pilipino	62,664	39.02
Erwin Maceda	Lakas–NUCD–UMDP	55,583	34.61
Magdaleno Palacol Jr.	Partido para sa Demokratikong Reporma	19,125	11.91
Benedicto Palacol	Partido Demokratiko Sosyalista ng Pilipinas	8,850	5.51
Antonio Relova	Liberal Party	8,315	5.18
Sesinando Fernando	Partido para sa Demokratikong Reporma	5,436	3.39
Rizalino Cariaso	Kilusang Bagong Lipunan	388	0.24
Daniel Romana	Aksyon Demokratiko	228	0.14
Total		160,589	100.00
Source: Commission on Elections

== Lanao del Norte ==
=== Lanao del Norte's 1st district ===
Incumbent Mariano Badelles of Lakas–NUCD–UMDP was term-limited. Lakas–NUCD–UMDP nominated Ramon Jacinto, who was defeated by Alipio Cirilo Badelles of Laban ng Makabayang Masang Pilipino.

Candidate	Party	Votes	%
Alipio Cirilo Badelles	Laban ng Makabayang Masang Pilipino	61,070	42.95
Ramon Jacinto	Lakas–NUCD–UMDP	53,769	37.82
Anthony Uriel Borja	Independent	26,813	18.86
Florence Villanueva	Independent	437	0.31
Michael Siangco	Independent	84	0.06
Total		142,173	100.00
Source: Commission on Elections

=== Lanao del Norte's 2nd district ===
Incumbent Abdullah Mangotara of Lakas–NUCD–UMDP was re-elected to a second term.

Candidate	Party	Votes	%
Abdullah Mangotara	Lakas–NUCD–UMDP	55,545	56.81
Mario Hisuler	Laban ng Makabayang Masang Pilipino	30,773	31.48
Allan Dimaporo	Partido para sa Demokratikong Reporma	8,152	8.34
Fe Salimbangon	Independent	3,299	3.37
Total		97,769	100.00
Source: Commission on Elections

== Lanao del Sur ==
=== Lanao del Sur's 1st district ===
Incumbent Mamintal Adiong Sr. of Lakas–NUCD–UMDP was re-elected to a third term.

Candidate	Party	Votes	%
Mamintal Adiong Sr. (incumbent)	Lakas–NUCD–UMDP	80,307	53.77
Abdulkhayr Alonto	Independent	56,503	37.83
Ombra Tamano	Laban ng Makabayang Masang Pilipino	10,978	7.35
Saripada Pacasum	Independent	791	0.53
Ahmad Cali	Laban ng Makabayang Masang Pilipino	339	0.23
Busar Magarang	Kilusang Bagong Lipunan	298	0.20
Medior Buleg	PPP	137	0.09
Total		149,353	100.00
Source: Commission on Elections

=== Lanao del Sur's 2nd district ===
Incumbent Pangalian Balindong of Lakas–NUCD–UMDP ran for a second term, but was defeated by Benasing Macarambon Jr. of the Ompia Party.

Candidate	Party	Votes	%
Benasing Macarambon Jr.	Ompia Party	46,462	46.90
Pangalian Balindong	Lakas–NUCD–UMDP	44,544	44.96
Jamil Lucman	Laban ng Makabayang Masang Pilipino	6,173	6.23
Taurac Mamacotao	Partido ng Masang Pilipino	1,592	1.61
Kasan Marohombsar	Nacionalista Party	294	0.30
Total		99,065	100.00
Source: Commission on Elections

== Las Piñas ==
Las Piñas' lone district was created on February 12, 1997, from Las Piñas–Muntinlupa's lone district. Incumbent Las Piñas–Muntinlupa's lone district representative Manny Villar of Lakas–NUCD–UMDP was re-elected to a third term.

Candidate	Party	Votes	%
Manny Villar	Lakas–NUCD–UMDP	146,310	92.65
Leoncio Enciso	Liberal Party	11,606	7.35
Total		157,916	100.00
Source: Commission on Elections

== Leyte ==
=== Leyte's 1st district ===
Incumbent Imelda Marcos of Kilusang Bagong Lipunan ran for President of the Philippines. Alfred Romualdez of Laban ng Makabayang Masang Pilipino won the election.

Candidate	Party	Votes	%
Alfred Romualdez	Laban ng Makabayang Masang Pilipino	66,488	55.16
Cirilo Montejo	Lakas–NUCD–UMDP	40,333	33.46
Emmanuel Saño	Liberal Party	5,924	4.92
Rogelio Acidre	Independent	4,347	3.61
Teresita Abiva	Independent	2,107	1.75
Lino Esteban Dunas	Partido para sa Demokratikong Reporma	1,261	1.05
Bartolome Lawsin	Lakas–NUCD–UMDP	67	0.06
Total		120,527	100.00
Source: Commission on Elections

=== Leyte's 2nd district ===
Incumbent Sergio Apostol of Lakas–NUCD–UMDP was re-elected to a third term.

Candidate	Party	Votes	%
Sergio Apostol (incumbent)	Lakas–NUCD–UMDP	76,904	77.23
Edgardo Enerlan	Laban ng Makabayang Masang Pilipino	19,331	19.41
Manuel Horca Jr.	Partido para sa Demokratikong Reporma	3,349	3.36
Total		99,584	100.00
Source: Commission on Elections

=== Leyte's 3rd district ===
Term-limited incumbent Alberto Veloso of Lakas–NUCD–UMDP ran for Governor of Leyte. Lakas–NUCD–UMDP nominated Edgar Veloso, who was defeated by Eduardo Veloso of the Liberal Party.

Candidate	Party	Votes	%
Eduardo Veloso	Liberal Party	17,739	37.89
Edgar Veloso	Lakas–NUCD–UMDP	15,104	32.26
Ralph Pastor Salazar	Independent	13,387	28.60
Eric de Veyra	Independent	354	0.76
Ramon Larrazabal Sr.	Laban ng Makabayang Masang Pilipino	230	0.49
Total		46,814	100.00
Source: Commission on Elections

=== Leyte's 4th district ===
Incumbent Carmelo Locsin of Lakas–NUCD–UMDP was term-limited. Lakas–NUCD–UMDP nominated Ma. Victoria Locsin, who won the election.

Candidate	Party	Votes	%
Ma. Victoria Locsin	Lakas–NUCD–UMDP	19,496	
Esteban Conejos Jr.	Independent		
Total			
Source: Commission on Elections

=== Leyte's 5th district ===
Incumbent Eriberto Loreto of Lakas–NUCD–UMDP was term-limited. Lakas–NUCD–UMDP nominated Nene Go, who won the election.

Candidate	Party	Votes	%
Nene Go	Lakas–NUCD–UMDP	30,475	26.34
Carmen Cari	Nationalist People's Coalition	24,162	20.88
Arturo Carlos Astorga II	Liberal Party	24,109	20.83
Jose Loreto	Laban ng Makabayang Masang Pilipino	20,263	17.51
Antonio Cablitas	Partido para sa Demokratikong Reporma	12,889	11.14
Manuel Melgazo	Kilusang Bagong Lipunan	3,358	2.90
Cirilo Tradio	Independent	461	0.40
Total		115,717	100.00
Source: Commission on Elections

== Maguindanao ==
=== Maguindanao's 1st district ===
Incumbent Didagen Dilangalen of the Laban ng Makabayang Masang Pilipino was re-elected to a second term.

Candidate	Party	Votes	%
Didagen Dilangalen (incumbent)	Laban ng Makabayang Masang Pilipino	90,565	63.60
Michael Mastura	Lakas–NUCD–UMDP	50,425	35.41
Agting Alamada	Partido para sa Demokratikong Reporma	1,120	0.79
Marcos Untong	PPP	281	0.20
Total		142,391	100.00
Source: Commission on Elections

=== Maguindanao's 2nd district ===
Incumbent Simeon Datumanong of Lakas–NUCD–UMDP was re-elected to a third term.

Candidate	Party	Votes	%
Simeon Datumanong (incumbent)	Lakas–NUCD–UMDP	68,913	66.58
Frances Cynthia Sayadi	Laban ng Makabayang Masang Pilipino	20,663	19.96
Cosain Akil	Liberal Party	13,929	13.46
Total		103,505	100.00
Source: Commission on Elections

== Makati ==
=== Makati's 1st district ===
Incumbent Joker Arroyo of Laban ng Makabayang Masang Pilipino was re-elected to a third term.

Candidate	Party	Votes	%
Joker Arroyo (incumbent)	Laban ng Makabayang Masang Pilipino	91,269	70.94
Rose Marie Arenas	Lakas–NUCD–UMDP	34,807	27.05
Alfonso Mike Policarpio	Independent	1,246	0.97
Perfecto Santos	Partido para sa Demokratikong Reporma	1,156	0.90
Adelia Insauriga	PDP–Laban	184	0.14
Total		128,662	100.00
Source: Commission on Elections

=== Makati's 2nd district ===
The seat was left vacant after Butz Aquino of Laban ng Demokratikong Pilipino, who received the most number of votes in the district in the 1995 election, was disqualified by the Commission on Elections on June 2, 1995, for lack of residency. Aquino ran in the 1998 election as the candidate of Laban ng Makabayang Masang Pilipino and won.

Candidate	Party	Votes	%
Butz Aquino	Laban ng Makabayang Masang Pilipino	76,807	65.85
Antonio Manalili	Lakas–NUCD–UMDP	19,971	17.12
Roberto Brillante	Partido para sa Demokratikong Reporma	10,334	8.86
Billy Bibit	Independent	9,232	7.92
Ramon Delloro	Kilusang Bagong Lipunan	294	0.25
Total		116,638	100.00
Source: Commission on Elections

== Malabon–Navotas ==
Term-limited incumbent Tessie Aquino-Oreta of Laban ng Makabayang Masang Pilipino (LAMMP) ran for the Senate. The LAMMP nominated Canuto Oreta, who was defeated by Ricky Sandoval of Lakas–NUCD–UMDP.

Candidate	Party	Votes	%
Ricky Sandoval	Lakas–NUCD–UMDP	86,245	45.36
Canuto Oreta	Laban ng Makabayang Masang Pilipino	82,339	43.30
Mariano Santiago	Partido para sa Demokratikong Reporma	8,579	4.51
Pedro Domingo	Liberal Party	6,277	3.30
Benito Symaco II	Independent	5,614	2.95
Warren Serna	Independent	1,090	0.57
Total		190,144	100.00
Source: Commission on Elections

== Mandaluyong ==
Incumbent Neptali Gonzales II of Lakas–NUCD–UMDP was re-elected to a second term.

Candidate	Party	Votes	%
Neptali Gonzales II	Lakas–NUCD–UMDP	75,792	63.56
Roberto Antonio	Laban ng Makabayang Masang Pilipino	43,456	36.44
Total		119,248	100.00
Source: Commission on Elections

== Manila ==
=== Manila's 1st district ===
Term-limited incumbent Martin Isidro of the Nationalist People's Coalition ran for Vice Mayor of Manila. Ernesto Nieva of Laban ng Makabayang Masang Pilipino won the election.

Candidate	Party	Votes	%
Ernesto Nieva	Laban ng Makabayang Masang Pilipino	65,136	48.88
Ernesto Dionisio	Liberal Party	46,942	35.23
Roberto Sese	Laban ng Makabayang Masang Pilipino	13,433	10.08
Honorio Lopez II	Lakas–NUCD–UMDP	7,365	5.53
Percy Lapid	Kilusang Bagong Lipunan	249	0.19
Abraham Liguidliguid	Kilusang Bagong Lipunan	121	0.09
Total		133,246	100.00
Source: Commission on Elections

=== Manila's 2nd district ===
Term-limited incumbent Jaime Lopez of Lakas–NUCD–UMDP ran for Mayor of Manila. Lakas–NUCD–UMDP nominated Flaviano Concepcion Jr., who was defeated by Nestor Ponce Jr. of the Liberal Party.

Candidate	Party	Votes	%
Nestor Ponce Jr.	Liberal Party	34,068	35.22
Natalio Beltran Jr.	Nationalist People's Coalition	28,850	29.83
Flaviano Concepcion Jr.	Lakas–NUCD–UMDP	26,841	27.75
Alberto Lim	Laban ng Makabayang Masang Pilipino	6,709	6.94
Gertrudes Reyes	Partido para sa Demokratikong Reporma	256	0.26
Total		96,724	100.00
Source: Commission on Elections

=== Manila's 3rd district ===
Incumbent Leonardo Fugoso of the Liberal Party was term-limited. The Liberal Party nominated Jhosep Lopez, who was defeated by Harry Angping of Laban ng Makabayang Masang Pilipino.

Candidate	Party	Votes	%
Harry Angping	Laban ng Makabayang Masang Pilipino	39,424	42.10
Jhosep Lopez	Liberal Party	34,387	36.72
Manuel Zarcal	Lakas–NUCD–UMDP	15,115	16.14
Joaquin Roces	Laban ng Makabayang Masang Pilipino	4,727	5.05
Total		93,653	100.00
Source: Commission on Elections

=== Manila's 4th district ===
Term-limited incumbent Ramon Bagatsing Jr. of Laban ng Makabayang Masang Pilipino (LAMMP) ran for the Senate. The LAMMP nominated Victoriano Melendez, who was defeated by Rodolfo Bacani of the Liberal Party.

Candidate	Party	Votes	%
Rodolfo Bacani	Liberal Party	43,643	37.06
Victoriano Melendez	Laban ng Makabayang Masang Pilipino	39,384	33.44
Ernesto Diokno	Lakas–NUCD–UMDP	33,858	28.75
Salvacion Aguila	Partido para sa Demokratikong Reporma	486	0.41
Douglas Santiago	Kilusang Bagong Lipunan	404	0.34
Total		117,775	100.00
Source: Commission on Elections

=== Manila's 5th district ===
Term-limited incumbent Amado Bagatsing of Laban ng Makabayang Masang Pilipino (LAMMP) ran for Mayor of Manila. The LAMMP nominated Felixberto Espiritu, who was defeated by Joey Hizon of the Liberal Party.

Candidate	Party	Votes	%
Joey Hizon	Liberal Party	64,023	61.78
Felixberto Espiritu	Laban ng Makabayang Masang Pilipino	34,347	33.15
Gonzalo Puyat II	Lakas–NUCD–UMDP	4,293	4.14
Lino Inciong	Independent	392	0.38
Mariano Abanilla	Partido para sa Demokratikong Reporma	386	0.37
Marlo de Mesa	Kilusang Bagong Lipunan	115	0.11
Ricardo Daniac	Independent	68	0.07
Total		103,624	100.00
Source: Commission on Elections

=== Manila's 6th district ===
Incumbent Rosenda Ann Ocampo of the Nationalist People's Coalition was re-elected to a third term.

Candidate	Party	Votes	%
Rosenda Ann Ocampo (incumbent)	Nationalist People's Coalition	67,721	69.27
Carlos Fernandez	Laban ng Makabayang Masang Pilipino	20,429	20.90
Arturo Añas	Lakas–NUCD–UMDP	8,881	9.08
Isidro Holgado	Kilusang Bagong Lipunan	401	0.41
Don Alvaro Gallarzan	Independent	328	0.34
Total		97,760	100.00
Source: Commission on Elections

== Marikina ==
Incumbent Romeo Candazo of the Liberal Party was re-elected to a third term.

Candidate	Party	Votes	%
Romeo Candazo (incumbent)	Liberal Party	91,661	59.55
Virgilio Farcon Jr.	Lakas–NUCD–UMDP	52,728	34.26
Rodolfo Valentino Sr.	Laban ng Makabayang Masang Pilipino	8,309	5.40
Peter Custodio	Partido para sa Demokratikong Reporma	1,218	0.79
Total		153,916	100.00
Source: Commission on Elections

== Marinduque ==
Term-limited incumbent Carmencita Reyes of Lakas–NUCD–UMDP ran for Governor of Marinduque. Lakas–NUCD–UMDP nominated Edmundo Reyes Jr., who won the election.

Candidate	Party	Votes	%
Edmundo Reyes Jr.	Lakas–NUCD–UMDP	39,331	49.02
Wilfredo Red	Lakas–NUCD–UMDP	30,705	38.27
Bernardo Jambalos	Laban ng Makabayang Masang Pilipino	10,108	12.60
Efren Marciano	Independent	85	0.11
Total		80,229	100.00
Source: Commission on Elections

== Masbate ==
=== Masbate's 1st district ===
Incumbent Vida Espinosa of Lakas–NUCD–UMDP was re-elected to a second term.

Candidate	Party	Votes	%
Vida Espinosa (incumbent)	Lakas–NUCD–UMDP	28,298	69.48
Sandra Cam	Partido para sa Demokratikong Reporma	9,934	24.39
Renato Montenegro	Laban ng Makabayang Masang Pilipino	2,497	6.13
Total		40,729	100.00
Source: Commission on Elections

=== Masbate's 2nd district ===
Term-limited incumbent Luz Cleta Bakunawa of Laban ng Makabayang Masang Pilipino (LAMMP) ran for Governor of Masbate. The LAMMP nominated Orlando Danao, who was defeated by Emilio Espinosa Jr. of Lakas–NUCD–UMDP.

Candidate	Party	Votes	%
Emilio Espinosa Jr.	Lakas–NUCD–UMDP	38,118	57.29
Orlando Danao	Laban ng Makabayang Masang Pilipino	28,421	42.71
Total		66,539	100.00
Source: Commission on Elections

=== Masbate's 3rd district ===
Incumbent Fausto Seachon Jr. of Lakas–NUCD–UMDP was re-elected to a second term.

Candidate	Party	Votes	%
Fausto Seachon Jr. (incumbent)	Lakas–NUCD–UMDP	38,006	45.41
Elisa Olga Kho	Partido para sa Demokratikong Reporma	30,115	35.98
Renato Magbalon	Independent	15,572	18.61
Total		83,693	100.00
Source: Commission on Elections

== Misamis Occidental ==
=== Misamis Occidental's 1st district ===
Incumbent Percival Catane of Lakas–NUCD–UMDP was re-elected to a third term.

Candidate	Party	Votes	%
Percival Catane (incumbent)	Lakas–NUCD–UMDP	72,934	87.72
Julio Ozamiz	Independent	8,086	9.73
Apolinario Castaño	Independent	2,124	2.55
Total		83,144	100.00
Source: Commission on Elections

=== Misamis Occidental's 2nd district ===
Incumbent Herminia Ramiro of Lakas–NUCD–UMDP retired. Lakas–NUCD–UMDP nominated Hilarion Ramiro Jr., who won the election.

Candidate	Party	Votes	%
Hilarion Ramiro Jr.	Lakas–NUCD–UMDP	39,844	39.02
Renato Parojinog	Laban ng Makabayang Masang Pilipino	32,549	31.88
Ceferino Ong	Partido para sa Demokratikong Reporma	22,700	22.23
Rodolfo Pactolin	Independent	6,571	6.44
Marino Magallanes	Independent	436	0.43
Total		102,100	100.00
Source: Commission on Elections

== Misamis Oriental ==
=== Misamis Oriental's 1st district ===
Incumbent Homobono Cezar of Lakas–NUCD–UMDP ran for a third term, but was defeated by Oscar Moreno of Lakas–NUCD–UMDP.

Candidate	Party	Votes	%
Oscar Moreno	Lakas–NUCD–UMDP	56,375	52.62
Homobono Cezar (incumbent)	Lakas–NUCD–UMDP	49,163	45.89
Demosthenes Mediante	Liberal Party	1,596	1.49
Total		107,134	100.00
Source: Commission on Elections

=== Misamis Oriental's 2nd district ===
Incumbent Victorico Chaves of Lakas–NUCD–UMDP was term-limited. Lakas–NUCD–UMDP nominated Ma. Catalina Chavez, who was defeated by Augusto Baculio of Laban ng Makabayang Masang Pilipino.

Candidate	Party	Votes	%
Augusto Baculio	Laban ng Makabayang Masang Pilipino	62,424	50.61
Ma. Catalina Chavez	Lakas–NUCD–UMDP	49,974	40.52
Santiago Sabal	Liberal Party	8,280	6.71
Cezar Gonzales	PDP–Laban	2,183	1.77
Crisanto Requino	Independent	481	0.39
Total		123,342	100.00
Source: Commission on Elections

== Mountain Province ==
Incumbent Victor Dominguez of Lakas–NUCD–UMDP was term-limited. Lakas–NUCD–UMDP nominated Josephine Dominguez, who won the election.

Candidate	Party	Votes	%
Josephine Dominguez	Lakas–NUCD–UMDP	19,559	37.30
Roy Pilando	PROMDI	19,300	36.81
Maximo Dalog	Laban ng Makabayang Masang Pilipino	13,571	25.88
Julio Bantali	PDP–Laban	2	0.00
Total		52,432	100.00
Source: Commission on Elections

== Muntinlupa ==
Muntinlupa's lone district was created on March 1, 1995, from Las Piñas–Muntinlupa's lone district. Ignacio Bunye of Lakas–NUCD–UMDP won the election.

Candidate	Party	Votes	%
Ignacio Bunye	Lakas–NUCD–UMDP	65,370	49.89
Ricardo Moldez	Laban ng Makabayang Masang Pilipino	52,496	40.06
Rufino Lizardo	Partido para sa Demokratikong Reporma	6,405	4.89
Gener Timbol	Lapiang Manggagawa	4,738	3.62
Victor Aguinaldo	Liberal Party	1,514	1.16
Ceferino Rivera	Independent	279	0.21
Alfonso Blanquisco	PDP–Laban	228	0.17
Total		131,030	100.00
Source: Commission on Elections

== Negros Occidental ==
=== Negros Occidental's 1st district ===
Incumbent Jules Ledesma of Lakas–NUCD–UMDP was re-elected to a second term unopposed.

Candidate	Party	Votes	%
Jules Ledesma (incumbent)	Lakas–NUCD–UMDP	66,537	100.00
Total		66,537	100.00
Source: Commission on Elections

=== Negros Occidental's 2nd district ===
Incumbent Alfredo Marañon of Lakas–NUCD–UMDP was re-elected to a second term unopposed.

Candidate	Party	Votes	%
Alfredo Marañon (incumbent)	Lakas–NUCD–UMDP	37,324	100.00
Total		37,324	100.00
Source: Commission on Elections

=== Negros Occidental's 3rd district ===
Incumbent Jose Carlos Lacson of Lakas–NUCD–UMDP was term-limited. Lakas–NUCD–UMDP nominated Cecila Lacson, who waas defeated by Edith Villanueva, an independent.

Candidate	Party	Votes	%
Edith Villanueva	Independent	72,453	51.70
Cecilia Lacson	Lakas–NUCD–UMDP	64,948	46.34
Ernesto Palanca	Independent	2,455	1.75
Maximo Bulilan	Kilusang Bagong Lipunan	217	0.15
Angel Dudero	People's Reform Party	72	0.05
Total		140,145	100.00
Source: Commission on Elections

=== Negros Occidental's 4th district ===
Incumbent Edward Matti of the Nationalist People's Coalition (NPC) was term-limited. The NPC nominated Charlie Cojuangco, who won the election.

Candidate	Party	Votes	%
Charlie Cojuangco	Nationalist People's Coalition	60,185	59.91
Alfredo Bustamante III	Independent	40,282	40.09
Total		100,467	100.00
Source: Commission on Elections

=== Negros Occidental's 5th district ===
Term-limited incumbent Mariano Yulo of Lakas–NUCD–UMDP ran for Governor of Negros Occidental. Lakas–NUCD–UMDP nominated Jose Apolinario Lozada, who won the election.

Candidate	Party	Votes	%
Jose Apolinario Lozada	Lakas–NUCD–UMDP	52,828	42.46
Enrique Montilla III	Nationalist People's Coalition	50,542	40.62
Gregorio Yulo	Independent	13,706	11.02
Ma. Socorro Tuvilla	Liberal Party	7,342	5.90
Total		124,418	100.00
Source: Commission on Elections

=== Negros Occidental's 6th district ===
Incumbent Genaro Alvarez Jr. of the Nationalist People's Coalition was re-elected to a second term.

Candidate	Party	Votes	%
Genaro Alvarez Jr. (incumbent)	Nationalist People's Coalition	79,118	71.30
Reynaldo Novero Jr.	Lakas–NUCD–UMDP	31,772	28.63
Pedie Loresto	Independent	77	0.07
Total		110,967	100.00
Source: Commission on Elections

== Negros Oriental ==
=== Negros Oriental's 1st district ===
Term-limited incumbent Jerome Paras of Lakas–NUCD–UMDP ran for Governor of Negros Oriental. Lakas–NUCD–UMDP nominated Jacinto Paras, who won the election.

Candidate	Party	Votes	%
Jacinto Paras	Lakas–NUCD–UMDP	63,285	70.32
Buenaventura Olladas	Laban ng Makabayang Masang Pilipino	22,049	24.50
Vicente Rabaya Sr.	Liberal Party	4,397	4.89
Auster Vailoces	Independent	175	0.19
Danilo Roble	Independent	96	0.11
Total		90,002	100.00
Source: Commission on Elections

=== Negros Oriental's 2nd district ===
Incumbent Miguel Romero of Lakas–NUCD–UMDP was term-limited. Lakas–NUCD–UMDP nominated Ramon Montaño, who was defeated by Emilio Macias of Laban ng Makabayang Masang Pilipino.

Candidate	Party	Votes	%
Emilio Macias	Laban ng Makabayang Masang Pilipino	99,241	70.02
Ramon Montaño	Lakas–NUCD–UMDP	41,746	29.45
Samuel Torres	Liberal Party	482	0.34
Raul Aniñon	Independent	271	0.19
Total		141,740	100.00
Source: Commission on Elections

=== Negros Oriental's 3rd district ===
Incumbent Margarito Teves of Lakas–NUCD–UMDP was term-limited. Lakas–NUCD–UMDP nominated Herminio Teves, who won the election.

Candidate	Party	Votes	%
Herminio Teves	Lakas–NUCD–UMDP	54,111	61.66
Jose Napigkit	Laban ng Makabayang Masang Pilipino	33,645	38.34
Total		87,756	100.00
Source: Commission on Elections

== Northern Samar ==
=== Northern Samar's 1st district ===
Term-limited incumbent Raul Daza of the Liberal Party ran for the Senate. The Liberal Party nominated Harlin Abayon, who won the election.

Candidate	Party	Votes	%
Harlin Abayon	Liberal Party	42,529	55.37
Bayani Dato	Lakas–NUCD–UMDP	32,938	42.88
Pedrito Tagle	Lakas–NUCD–UMDP	1,236	1.61
Paul Pua	Independent	103	0.13
Total		76,806	100.00
Source: Commission on Elections

=== Northern Samar's 2nd district ===
Incumbent Wilmar Lucero of the Liberal Party ran for a third term, but was defeated by Romualdo Vicencio of Lakas–NUCD–UMDP.

Candidate	Party	Votes	%
Romualdo Vicencio	Lakas–NUCD–UMDP	36,332	51.00
Wilmar Lucero (incumbent)	Liberal Party	34,904	49.00
Total		71,236	100.00
Source: Commission on Elections

== Nueva Ecija ==
=== Nueva Ecija's 1st district ===
Incumbent Renato Diaz of Lakas–NUCD–UMDP ran for a third term, but was defeated by Josefina Joson of Laban ng Makabayang Masang Pilipino.

Candidate	Party	Votes	%
Josefina Joson	Laban ng Makabayang Masang Pilipino	87,520	51.73
Renato Diaz (incumbent)	Lakas–NUCD–UMDP	81,652	48.27
Total		169,172	100.00
Source: Commission on Elections

=== Nueva Ecija's 2nd district ===
Incumbent Eleuterio Violago of Lakas–NUCD–UMDP ran for a third term, but was defeated by Simeon Garcia Jr. of Laban ng Makabayang Masang Pilipino.

Candidate	Party	Votes	%
Simeon Garcia Jr.	Laban ng Makabayang Masang Pilipino	70,275	50.80
Eleuterio Violago (incumbent)	Lakas–NUCD–UMDP	67,681	48.93
Eugenio Santos Jr.	PDP–Laban	369	0.27
Total		138,325	100.00
Source: Commission on Elections

=== Nueva Ecija's 3rd district ===
Incumbent Pacifico Fajardo of Lakas–NUCD–UMDP was re-elected to a third term.

Candidate	Party	Votes	%
Pacifico Fajardo (incumbent)	Lakas–NUCD–UMDP	73,610	46.39
Philip Ordoñez	Laban ng Makabayang Masang Pilipino	58,742	37.02
Emmanuel Santos	Lakas–NUCD–UMDP	25,833	16.28
Meliton Pajarillaga	Lakas–NUCD–UMDP	268	0.17
Presciliano Evangelista	Kilusang Bagong Lipunan	232	0.15
Total		158,685	100.00
Source: Commission on Elections

=== Nueva Ecija's 4th district ===
Incumbent Julita Villareal of Lakas–NUCD–UMDP was re-elected to a second term.

Candidate	Party	Votes	%
Julita Villareal (incumbent)	Lakas–NUCD–UMDP	103,632	60.48
Froilan Nagano	Nationalist People's Coalition	33,643	19.63
Oscar Tinio	Lakas–NUCD–UMDP	33,531	19.57
Proceso Isidro	Bago	446	0.26
Antonio Cabriza	Kilusang Bagong Lipunan	49	0.03
Evelio Jolo	PDP–Laban	46	0.03
Total		171,347	100.00
Source: Commission on Elections

== Nueva Vizcaya ==
Incumbent Carlos Padilla of Laban ng Makabayang Masang Pilipino was re-elected to a second term.

Candidate	Party	Votes	%
Carlos Padilla (incumbent)	Laban ng Makabayang Masang Pilipino	98,874	75.30
Ernesto Salunat	Lakas–NUCD–UMDP	31,889	24.29
Candido Talosig Jr.	Independent	281	0.21
Lawrence Santa Ana	Liberal Party	256	0.19
Total		131,300	100.00
Source: Commission on Elections

== Occidental Mindoro ==
Incumbent Jose Villarosa of Lakas–NUCD–UMDP retired. Lakas–NUCD–UMDP nominated Girlie Villarosa, who won the election.

Candidate	Party	Votes	%
Girlie Villarosa	Lakas–NUCD–UMDP	55,400	51.41
Ricardo Quintos	Lakas–NUCD–UMDP	52,368	48.59
Total		107,768	100.00
Source: Commission on Elections

== Oriental Mindoro ==
=== Oriental Mindoro's 1st district ===
Incumbent Renato Leviste of Lakas–NUCD–UMDP was re-elected to a third term.

Candidate	Party	Votes	%
Renato Leviste (incumbent)	Lakas–NUCD–UMDP	79,530	69.61
Arleo Magtibay	Laban ng Makabayang Masang Pilipino	32,109	28.11
Nestor Atienza	Partido para sa Demokratikong Reporma	2,537	2.22
Enrico Adeva	PDP–Laban	68	0.06
Total		114,244	100.00
Source: Commission on Elections

=== Oriental Mindoro's 2nd district ===
Term-limited incumbent Jesus Punzalan of Lakas–NUCD–UMDP ran for Governor of Oriental Mindoro. Lakas–NUCD–UMDP nominated Erwin Enriquez, who was defeated by Manuel Andaya of Laban ng Makabayang Masang Pilipino.

Candidate	Party	Votes	%
Manuel Andaya	Laban ng Makabayang Masang Pilipino	25,672	28.06
Rufino Reyes Jr.	Laban ng Makabayang Masang Pilipino	18,999	20.76
Gelacio Yason	Partido para sa Demokratikong Reporma	15,993	17.48
Erwin Enriquez	Lakas–NUCD–UMDP	12,045	13.16
Antonio delos Reyes	Independent	8,286	9.06
Renato Reyes	Liberal Party	7,425	8.11
Fausto Sangil	Independent	1,539	1.68
Manuel Morente Jr.	Independent	1,516	1.66
Miguel Ansaldo Jr.	Independent	29	0.03
Total		91,504	100.00
Source: Commission on Elections

== Palawan ==
=== Palawan's 1st district ===
Incumbent Vicente Sandoval of Lakas–NUCD–UMDP was re-elected to a second term.

Candidate	Party	Votes	%
Vicente Sandoval (incumbent)	Lakas–NUCD–UMDP	52,997	65.58
Alberto Enriquez Jr.	Partido para sa Demokratikong Reporma	27,821	34.42
Total		80,818	100.00
Source: Commission on Elections

=== Palawan's 2nd district ===
Incumbent Alfredo Abueg Jr. of Lakas–NUCD–UMDP was re-elected to a third term.

Candidate	Party
Alfredo Abueg Jr. (incumbent)	Lakas–NUCD–UMDP
Total
Source: Commission on Elections

== Pampanga ==
=== Pampanga's 1st district ===
Term-limited incumbent Carmelo Lazatin Sr. of Lakas–NUCD–UMDP ran for Mayor of Angeles City. Lakas–NUCD–UMDP nominated Edgardo Pamintuan Sr., who was defeated by Francis Nepomuceno of Laban ng Makabayang Masang Pilipino.

Candidate	Party	Votes	%
Francis Nepomuceno	Laban ng Makabayang Masang Pilipino	71,802	43.73
Edgardo Pamintuan Sr.	Lakas–NUCD–UMDP	62,237	37.91
Reynaldo Guiao	Independent	28,834	17.56
Eliseo Siopangco	Independent	741	0.45
Florante Quizon	Partido para sa Demokratikong Reporma	574	0.35
Total		164,188	100.00
Source: Commission on Elections

=== Pampanga's 2nd district ===
Incumbent Zenaida Cruz-Ducut of Laban ng Makabayang Masang Pilipino was re-elected to a second term.

Candidate	Party	Votes	%
Zenaida Cruz-Ducut (incumbent)	Laban ng Makabayang Masang Pilipino	94,226	56.57
Roy David	Lakas–NUCD–UMDP	48,845	29.33
Dante David	Liberal Party	23,407	14.05
Marcelino Manalansan	Independent	77	0.05
Total		166,555	100.00
Source: Commission on Elections

=== Pampanga's 3rd district ===
Incumbent Oscar Samson Rodriguez of Lakas–NUCD–UMDP was re-elected to a second term.

Candidate	Party	Votes	%
Oscar Samson Rodriguez (incumbent)	Lakas–NUCD–UMDP	125,640	72.86
Ma. Bernardita Herrera	Nationalist People's Coalition	43,939	25.48
Eligio Mallari	Kabalikat ng Mamamayang Pilipino	2,698	1.56
Eligio Ocampo	Kilusang Bagong Lipunan	152	0.09
Total		172,429	100.00
Source: Commission on Elections

=== Pampanga's 4th district ===
Incumbent Emigdio Bondoc of Lakas–NUCD–UMDP was term-limited. Lakas–NUCD–UMDP nominated Juan Pablo Bondoc, who won the election.

Candidate	Party	Votes	%
Juan Pablo Bondoc	Lakas–NUCD–UMDP	97,204	58.96
Marciano Pineda	Laban ng Makabayang Masang Pilipino	60,509	36.70
Edgardo Puno	Lakas–NUCD–UMDP	7,051	4.28
Jose Teofilo Mercado	Independent	53	0.03
Macario Viray	Independent	43	0.03
Total		164,860	100.00
Source: Commission on Elections

== Pangasinan ==
=== Pangasinan's 1st district ===
Incumbent Hernani Braganza of Lakas–NUCD–UMDP was re-elected to a second term unopposed.

Candidate	Party	Votes	%
Hernani Braganza (incumbent)	Lakas–NUCD–UMDP	108,604	100.00
Total		108,604	100.00
Source: Commission on Elections

=== Pangasinan's 2nd district ===
Incumbent Antonio Bengson III of Lakas–NUCD–UMDP ran for a second term, but was defeated by Teodoro Cruz of Laban ng Makabayang Masang Pilipino.

Candidate	Party	Votes	%
Teodoro Cruz	Laban ng Makabayang Masang Pilipino	80,119	54.76
Antonio Bengson III (incumbent)	Lakas–NUCD–UMDP	53,448	36.53
Alberto Zamuco	Partido para sa Demokratikong Reporma	11,941	8.16
Manuel Castro	Partido para sa Demokratikong Reporma	622	0.43
Mariano Padlan	Independent	171	0.12
Total		146,301	100.00
Source: Commission on Elections

=== Pangasinan's 3rd district ===
Incumbent Eric Galo Acuña of Lakas–NUCD–UMDP ran for a third term, but was defeated by Generoso Tulagan of Laban ng Makabayang Masang Pilipino.

Candidate	Party	Votes	%
Generoso Tulagan	Laban ng Makabayang Masang Pilipino	91,888	50.49
Eric Galo Acuña (incumbent)	Lakas–NUCD–UMDP	88,163	48.44
Gabino Samson	Independent	1,074	0.59
Sergia Abrigo	Independent	882	0.48
Total		182,007	100.00
Source: Commission on Elections

=== Pangasinan's 4th district ===
Term-limited incumbent Jose de Venecia Jr. of Lakas–NUCD–UMDP ran for President of the Philippines. Lakas–NUCD–UMDP nominated Benjamin Lim, who won the election.

Candidate	Party	Votes	%
Benjamin Lim	Lakas–NUCD–UMDP	72,027	51.02
Teresita de Venecia	Independent	63,730	45.14
Oscar Fernandez	Independent	2,253	1.60
Juan Siapno Jr.	Laban ng Makabayang Masang Pilipino	1,840	1.30
Ramoncito Manaois	Kilusang Bagong Lipunan	1,042	0.74
Modesto Capulong	Independent	204	0.14
Cipriano Torio Jr.	Independent	87	0.06
Total		141,183	100.00
Source: Commission on Elections

=== Pangasinan's 5th district ===
Incumbent Amadeo Perez Jr. of Lakas–NUCD–UMDP was re-elected to a third term unopposed.

Candidate	Party	Votes	%
Amadeo Perez Jr. (incumbent)	Lakas–NUCD–UMDP	137,085	100.00
Total		137,085	100.00
Source: Commission on Elections

=== Pangasinan's 6th district ===
Incumbent Ranjit Shahani of Lakas–NUCD–UMDP was re-elected to a second term.

Candidate	Party	Votes	%
Ranjit Shahani	Lakas–NUCD–UMDP	114,969	85.18
Emiliano Micu	Laban ng Makabayang Masang Pilipino	20,006	14.82
Total		134,975	100.00
Source: Commission on Elections

== Parañaque ==
Incumbent Roilo Golez of Laban ng Makabayang Masang Pilipino was re-elected to a third term.

Candidate	Party	Votes	%
Roilo Golez (incumbent)	Laban ng Makabayang Masang Pilipino	107,316	60.11
Walfrido Ferrer	Lakas–NUCD–UMDP	65,467	36.67
Sonia de Jesus	Aksyon Demokratiko	2,755	1.54
Pacifico Rosal	People's Reform Party	1,712	0.96
Evelyn Langit	Kilusang Bagong Lipunan	753	0.42
Ernesto Dacuycuy	Kilusang Bagong Lipunan	520	0.29
Total		178,523	100.00
Source: Commission on Elections

== Pasay ==
Incumbent Jovito Claudio of Lakas–NUCD–UMDP retired to run for Mayor of Pasay. Lakas–NUCD–UMDP nominated Elaine Cuneta, who was defeated by Rolando Briones of the Nationalist People's Coalition.

Candidate	Party	Votes	%
Rolando Briones	Nationalist People's Coalition	47,292	31.33
Edita Vergel de Dios	Laban ng Makabayang Masang Pilipino	38,920	25.79
Elaine Cuneta	Lakas–NUCD–UMDP	21,859	14.48
Reynaldo Bagatsing	Liberal Party	18,892	12.52
Cesar Ochoa	Aksyon Demokratiko	14,937	9.90
Norma Urbina	Partido para sa Demokratikong Reporma	8,189	5.43
Crisanto Cornejo	Independent	485	0.32
Rolando Ledesma	Kilusang Bagong Lipunan	364	0.24
Total		150,938	100.00
Source: Commission on Elections

== Pasig ==
Incumbent Rufino Javier of the Nationalist People's Coalition was term-limited. Henry Lanot of Laban ng Makabayang Masang Pilipino won the election.

Candidate	Party	Votes	%
Henry Lanot	Laban ng Makabayang Masang Pilipino	60,914	
Arnulfo Acedera Jr.	Lakas–NUCD–UMDP		
Marcelino Arias	Nacionalista Party		
Roberto Bassig	Independent		
Esmeraldo Batacan	Partido para sa Demokratikong Reporma		
Emiliano Caruncho III	Liberal Party		
Francisco Rivera Jr.	Partido para sa Demokratikong Reporma		
Elpidio Tuazon	Independent		
Raoul Victorino	Liberal Party		
Total			
Source: Commission on Elections

== Quezon ==
=== Quezon's 1st district ===
Term-limited incumbent Wilfrido Enverga of Laban ng Makabayang Masang Pilipino (LAMMP) ran for Governor of Quezon. The LAMMP nominated Faustino Silang and Imelda Rodriguez, who were both defeated by Rafael Nantes of Partido para sa Demokratikong Reporma.

Candidate	Party	Votes	%
Rafael Nantes	Partido para sa Demokratikong Reporma	45,180	33.22
Faustino Silang	Laban ng Makabayang Masang Pilipino	26,771	19.68
Danilo Coronacion	Lakas–NUCD–UMDP	18,709	13.76
Pilar Almira	Liberal Party	13,504	9.93
Imelda Rodriguez	Laban ng Makabayang Masang Pilipino	12,913	9.49
Eladio Pasamba	Independent	10,612	7.80
Jose Mario Buñag	Aksyon Demokratiko	5,231	3.85
Edelyn Loo	Independent	3,082	2.27
Total		136,002	100.00
Source: Commission on Elections

=== Quezon's 2nd district ===
Incumbent Marcial Punzalan Jr. of Lakas–NUCD–UMDP was re-elected to a third term.

Candidate	Party	Votes	%
Marcial Punzalan Jr. (incumbent)	Lakas–NUCD–UMDP	155,615	92.23
Hjalmar Quintana	Liberal Party	6,928	4.11
Guillermo Formaran Jr.	Laban ng Makabayang Masang Pilipino	5,740	3.40
Rolando Rafa	Independent	238	0.14
Generoso Factor	Independent	209	0.12
Total		168,730	100.00
Source: Commission on Elections

=== Quezon's 3rd district ===
Incumbent Danilo Suarez of Lakas–NUCD–UMDP was re-elected to a thirdterm.

Candidate	Party	Votes	%
Danilo Suarez (incumbent)	Lakas–NUCD–UMDP	66,207	91.39
Samson Rosales	Independent	6,237	8.61
Total		72,444	100.00
Source: Commission on Elections

=== Quezon's 4th district ===
Incumbent Wigberto Tañada of the Liberal Party was re-elected to a second term.

Candidate	Party	Votes	%
Wigberto Tañada (incumbent)	Liberal Party	75,437	56.95
Joel Arago	Lakas–NUCD–UMDP	31,708	23.94
Manolet Lavides	Partido para sa Demokratikong Reporma	25,307	19.11
Total		132,452	100.00
Source: Commission on Elections

== Quezon City ==
=== Quezon City's 1st district ===
Incumbent Reynaldo Calalay of Laban ng Makabayang Masang Pilipino was re-elected to a second term.

Candidate	Party	Votes	%
Reynaldo Calalay (incumbent)	Laban ng Makabayang Masang Pilipino	54,111	33.09
Renato Yap	Lakas–NUCD–UMDP	40,197	24.58
Victor Ferrer	Partido para sa Demokratikong Reporma	33,027	20.20
Moises Samson	Liberal Party	29,856	18.26
Salvador Tolentino	Independent	4,298	2.63
Lorenzo Gallegos	Kilusang Bagong Lipunan	1,315	0.80
Ruben Posadas	Independent	486	0.30
Gherry Guillergan	Independent	128	0.08
Cyrene Ravalo	Independent	101	0.06
Total		163,519	100.00
Source: Commission on Elections

=== Quezon City's 2nd district ===
Incumbent Dante Liban of Lakas–NUCD–UMDP was re-elected to a third term.

Candidate	Party	Votes	%
Dante Liban (incumbent)	Lakas–NUCD–UMDP	217,856	64.77
Anthony Alonzo	Partido para sa Demokratikong Reporma	60,856	18.09
Melanio Mauricio Jr.	Laban ng Makabayang Masang Pilipino	30,586	9.09
Luis Saludes	Laban ng Makabayang Masang Pilipino	15,458	4.60
Amado Valdez	Independent	7,417	2.21
Nid Anima	Liberal Party	1,333	0.40
Felizardo Francsico	Independent	717	0.21
Fortunato Gabon Jr.	PDP–Laban	687	0.20
Isidro Moral Jr.	Independent	392	0.12
Anastacio Calasang	Kilusang Bagong Lipunan	375	0.11
Jesus Ernesto Delfin	Kilusang Bagong Lipunan	342	0.10
Lino Gozum	Independent	303	0.09
Alicia Herrera	PDP–Laban	6	0.00
Total		336,328	100.00
Source: Commission on Elections

=== Quezon City's 3rd district ===
Incumbent Mike Defensor of the Liberal Party was re-elected to a second term.

Candidate	Party	Votes	%
Mike Defensor (incumbent)	Liberal Party	43,970	38.90
Ramon Orosa	Lakas–NUCD–UMDP	24,988	22.11
Franz Pumaren	Laban ng Makabayang Masang Pilipino	22,138	19.59
Cesar Dario Jr.	Aksyon Demokratiko	9,789	8.66
Anselmo Adriano	People's Reform Party	8,181	7.24
Ricardo Penson	Partido para sa Demokratikong Reporma	3,629	3.21
Eddie-Per Undag	Kilusang Bagong Lipunan	176	0.16
Rey Borromeo	Kilusang Bagong Lipunan	158	0.14
Total		113,029	100.00
Source: Commission on Elections

=== Quezon City's 4th district ===
Incumbent Feliciano Belmonte Jr. of Lakas–NUCD–UMDP was re-elected to a third term.

Candidate	Party	Votes	%
Feliciano Belmonte Jr. (incumbent)	Lakas–NUCD–UMDP	142,300	96.05
Hans Palacios	Liberal Party	3,658	2.47
Jesus Cellano Jr.	Partido para sa Demokratikong Reporma	1,423	0.96
Gerardo Sabiniano	Kilusang Bagong Lipunan	764	0.52
Total		148,145	100.00
Source: Commission on Elections

== Quirino ==
Incumbent Junie Cua of Lakas–NUCD–UMDP was term-limited. Lakas–NUCD–UMDP nominated Maria Angela Cua, who won the election.

Candidate	Party	Votes	%
Maria Angela Cua	Lakas–NUCD–UMDP	38,665	69.83
Jonathan dela Cruz	Laban ng Makabayang Masang Pilipino	6,032	10.89
Persie Aldaba	Laban ng Makabayang Masang Pilipino	5,832	10.53
Eduardo Balderas	Independent	4,323	7.81
Florentina Blando	Independent	507	0.92
Antonio Gutierrez	Partido para sa Demokratikong Reporma	11	0.02
Total		55,370	100.00
Source: Commission on Elections

== Rizal ==
=== Rizal's 1st district ===
Incumbent Gilberto Duavit Sr. of the Nationalist People's Coalition was re-elected to a second term.

Candidate	Party	Votes	%
Gilberto Duavit Sr. (incumbent)	Nationalist People's Coalition	148,261	70.30
Wilfrido Naval	Lakas–NUCD–UMDP	51,979	24.65
Danilo Sanchez	Independent	10,662	5.06
Total		210,902	100.00
Source: Commission on Elections

=== Rizal's 2nd district ===
Incumbent Emigdio Tanjuatco Jr. of Lakas–NUCD–UMDP was term-limited. Lakas–NUCD–UMDP nominated Reynaldo San Juan, who was defeated by Isidro Rodriguez Jr. of Laban ng Makabayang Masang Pilipino.

Candidate	Party	Votes	%
Isidro Rodriguez Jr.	Laban ng Makabayang Masang Pilipino	57,995	33.67
Reynaldo San Juan	Lakas–NUCD–UMDP	38,235	22.20
Nicandro Natividad	Liberal Party	30,416	17.66
Rolando Rivera	Kabalikat ng Mamamayang Pilipino	25,304	14.69
Francisco Guillermo	Lakas–NUCD–UMDP	19,441	11.29
Lydia Guido	Independent	846	0.49
Total		172,237	100.00
Source: Commission on Elections

== Romblon ==
Incumbent Eleandro Jesus Madrona of Lakas–NUCD–UMDP was re-elected to a third term.

Candidate	Party	Votes	%
Eleandro Jesus Madrona (incumbent)	Lakas–NUCD–UMDP	51,125	58.83
Jose Madrid	Independent	24,730	28.46
Renato Sison	Laban ng Makabayang Masang Pilipino	10,999	12.66
Achilles Asturias	Independent	46	0.05
Total		86,900	100.00
Source: Commission on Elections

== Samar ==
=== Samar's 1st district ===
Incumbent Rodolfo Tuazon of Lakas–NUCD–UMDP was re-elected to a third term.

Candidate	Party	Votes	%
Rodolfo Tuazon (incumbent)	Lakas–NUCD–UMDP	56,772	56.90
Pacifico Maghacot Jr.	Liberal Party	40,955	41.05
Virgilio Rosales	Laban ng Makabayang Masang Pilipino	2,028	2.03
Bonifacio Estrada	Independent	13	0.01
Total		99,768	100.00
Source: Commission on Elections

=== Samar's 2nd district ===
Incumbent Catalino Figueroa of Lakas–NUCD–UMDP ran for a third term, but was defeated by Antonio Nachura of the Liberal Party.

Candidate	Party	Votes	%
Antonio Nachura	Liberal Party	56,915	50.57
Catalino Figueroa (incumbent)	Lakas–NUCD–UMDP	52,357	46.52
Amado Deloria	Laban ng Makabayang Masang Pilipino	2,266	2.01
Venancio Garduce	Kabalikat ng Mamamayang Pilipino	1,017	0.90
Total		112,555	100.00
Source: Commission on Elections

== San Juan ==
Incumbent Ronaldo Zamora of Laban ng Makabayang Masang Pilipino (LAMMP) was term-limited. The LAMMP nominated Jose Mari Gonzales, who won the election.

Candidate	Party	Votes	%
Jose Mari Gonzales	Laban ng Makabayang Masang Pilipino	35,353	63.83
Reynaldo San Pascual	Partido para sa Demokratikong Reporma	18,394	33.21
Manuel Andrada	Independent	1,408	2.54
Arcelino Cruz	Independent	193	0.35
Rodolfo Baltazar	Kilusang Bagong Lipunan	38	0.07
Total		55,386	100.00
Source: Commission on Elections

== Sarangani ==
Incumbent James Chiongbian of Lakas–NUCD–UMDP was term-limited. Lakas–NUCD–UMDP nominated Lucille Chiongbian-Solon. Juan Domino of Laban ng Makabayang Masang Pilipino got the most number of votes in the election, but was already declared as disqualified by the Commission on Election's Second Division on May 6, 1998, due to lack of residence.

Candidate	Party	Votes	%
Juan Domino	Laban ng Makabayang Masang Pilipino	53,843	50.03
Lucille Chiongbian-Solon	Lakas–NUCD–UMDP	53,505	49.72
Rogelio Dumaguing	PDP–Laban	272	0.25
Total		107,620	100.00
Source: Commission on Elections

== Siquijor ==
Incumbent Orlando Fua of Lakas–NUCD–UMDP was term-limited. Lakas–NUCD–UMDP nominated Orlando Fua Jr., who won the election.

Candidate	Party	Votes	%
Orlando Fua Jr.	Lakas–NUCD–UMDP	21,459	59.69
Guido Ganhinhin	Laban ng Makabayang Masang Pilipino	14,425	40.12
Simeon Jaicten	PROMDI	58	0.16
Jose Vios	Independent	11	0.03
Total		35,953	100.00
Source: Commission on Elections

== Sorsogon ==
=== Sorsogon's 1st district ===
Incumbent Salvador Escudero of Lakas–NUCD–UMDP was term-limited. Lakas–NUCD–UMDP nominated Francis Escudero, who won the election, and Elizalde Diaz.

Candidate	Party	Votes	%
Francis Escudero	Lakas–NUCD–UMDP	57,121	55.59
Elizalde Diaz	Lakas–NUCD–UMDP	22,740	22.13
Fernando Duran Jr.	Laban ng Makabayang Masang Pilipino	17,108	16.65
Gil Gojol	Liberal Party	5,781	5.63
Total		102,750	100.00
Source: Commission on Elections

=== Sorsogon's 2nd district ===
Incumbent Bonifacio Gillego of Lakas–NUCD–UMDP was term-limited. Lakas–NUCD–UMDP nominated Rodolfo Gonzales, who won the election, and Eddie Dorotan.

Candidate	Party	Votes	%
Rodolfo Gonzales	Lakas–NUCD–UMDP	46,379	42.70
Eddie Dorotan	Lakas–NUCD–UMDP	24,326	22.40
Jose Solis	Laban ng Makabayang Masang Pilipino	22,182	20.42
Beda Fajardo	Liberal Party	5,966	5.49
Redentor Guyala	Laban ng Makabayang Masang Pilipino	5,347	4.92
Jose Sabater	Liberal Party	3,891	3.58
Romeo delos Reyes	Partido para sa Demokratikong Reporma	519	0.48
Total		108,610	100.00
Source: Commission on Elections

== South Cotabato ==
=== South Cotabato's 1st district ===
Incumbent Luwalhati Antonino of Laban ng Makabayang Masang Pilipino was re-elected to a third term.

Candidate	Party	Votes	%
Luwalhati Antonino (incumbent)	Laban ng Makabayang Masang Pilipino	110,423	57.62
Carmelo Royeca	Lakas–NUCD–UMDP	65,317	34.08
Edwin Torres	Independent	15,055	7.86
Ulysses Villanueva	Independent	843	0.44
Total		191,638	100.00
Source: Commission on Elections

=== South Cotabato's 2nd district ===
Incumbent Daisy Avance Fuentes of Laban ng Makabayang Masang Pilipino was re-elected to a third term.

Candidate	Party	Votes	%
Daisy Avance Fuentes (incumbent)	Laban ng Makabayang Masang Pilipino	128,159	80.43
Fernando Miguel	PROMDI	29,512	18.52
Amparo Pingoy	Liberal Party	1,105	0.69
Flor Libdan	PDP–Laban	570	0.36
Total		159,346	100.00
Source: Commission on Elections

== Southern Leyte ==
Incumbent Roger Mercado of Lakas–NUCD–UMDP ran for a third term, but was defeated by Aniceto Saludo Jr. of Laban ng Makabayang Masang Pilipino.

Candidate	Party	Votes	%
Anecito Saludo	Laban ng Makabayang Masang Pilipino	70,394	54.21
Roger Mercado (incumbent)	Lakas–NUCD–UMDP	59,465	45.79
Total		129,859	100.00
Source: Commission on Elections

== Sultan Kudarat ==
Incumbent Angelo Montilla of the Nationalist People's Coalition was re-elected to a second term.

Candidate	Party	Votes	%
Angelo Montilla (incumbent)	Nationalist People's Coalition	80,767	48.99
Nesthur Gumana	Lakas–NUCD–UMDP	66,576	40.39
Carlos Valdez Jr.	Laban ng Makabayang Masang Pilipino	16,128	9.78
Rey Payar	PDP–Laban	1,381	0.84
Total		164,852	100.00
Source: Commission on Elections

== Sulu ==
=== Sulu's 1st district ===
Incumbent Bensaudi Tulawie of Laban ng Makabayang Masang Pilipino ran for a second term, but was defeated by Hussin Ututalum Amin of Lakas–NUCD–UMDP.

Candidate	Party	Votes	%
Hussin Ututalum Amin	Lakas–NUCD–UMDP	30,978	41.45
Benjamin Loong	Lakas–NUCD–UMDP	21,994	29.43
Bensaudi Tulawie (incumbent)	Laban ng Makabayang Masang Pilipino	14,241	19.05
Hadja Nerna Tulawie	Lakas–NUCD–UMDP	7,525	10.07
Total		74,738	100.00
Source: Commission on Elections

=== Sulu's 2nd district ===
Incumbent Asani Tammang of Lakas–NUCD–UMDP was re-elected to a third term.

Candidate	Party	Votes	%
Asani Tammang (incumbent)	Lakas–NUCD–UMDP	24,749	38.73
Abdurahman Burahan	Laban ng Makabayang Masang Pilipino	20,489	32.07
Rudjia Anni	Lakas–NUCD–UMDP	17,598	27.54
Wilson Anni	Lakas–NUCD–UMDP	1,062	1.66
Total		63,898	100.00
Source: Commission on Elections

== Surigao del Norte ==
=== Surigao del Norte's 1st district ===
Incumbent Constantino Navarro Jr. of Lakas–NUCD–UMDP was re-elected to a second term.

Candidate	Party	Votes	%
Constantino Navarro Jr. (incumbent)	Lakas–NUCD–UMDP	35,837	51.91
Glenda Ecleo	Liberal Party	33,202	48.09
Total		69,039	100.00
Source: Commission on Elections

=== Surigao del Norte's 2nd district ===
Incumbent Robert Barbers of Lakas–NUCD–UMDP was appointed as the secretary of Department of the Interior and Local Government in 1996 and became vacated. His son, Ace Barbers took his place and won.

Candidate	Party	Votes	%
Robert Ace Barbers	Lakas–NUCD–UMDP	56,037	56.39
Nicanor Sering	Laban ng Makabayang Masang Pilipino	27,741	27.91
Wilfredo Chato	Partido para sa Demokratikong Reporma	12,295	12.37
Wencelito Andanar	Kabalikat ng Mamamayang Pilipino	3,309	3.33
Total		99,382	100.00
Source: Commission on Elections

== Surigao del Sur ==
=== Surigao del Sur's 1st district ===
Incumbent Mario Ty of Lakas–NUCD–UMDP was term-limited. Lakas–NUCD–UMDP nominated Prospero Pichay, who won the election.

Candidate	Party	Votes	%
Prospero Pichay	Lakas–NUCD–UMDP	54,649	53.98
Alvin Ty	Laban ng Makabayang Masang Pilipino	46,436	45.87
Gil Acosta	Independent	149	0.15
Total		101,234	100.00
Source: Commission on Elections

=== Surigao del Sur's 2nd district ===
Incumbent Jesnar Falcon of Lakas–NUCD–UMDP was re-elected to a second term.

Candidate	Party	Votes	%
Jesnar Falcon (incumbent)	Lakas–NUCD–UMDP	61,328	79.39
Quirico Lim	Laban ng Makabayang Masang Pilipino	13,166	17.04
Manuel Pepino	Lapiang Manggagawa	2,755	3.57
Total		77,249	100.00
Source: Commission on Elections

== Taguig–Pateros ==
Term-limited incumbent Dante Tiñga of Lakas–NUCD–UMDP ran for Mayor of Taguig. Lakas–NUCD–UMDP nominated Allan Paul Cruz and Sigfrido Tiñga, who both lost to Alan Peter Cayetano of the Liberal Party.

Candidate	Party	Votes	%
Alan Peter Cayetano	Liberal Party	104,491	62.33
Allan Paul Cruz	Lakas–NUCD–UMDP	41,993	25.05
Rodolfo de Guzman	Partido para sa Demokratikong Reporma	13,757	8.21
Rashid Saber	Independent	3,112	1.86
Antonino Tobias III	Independent	2,041	1.22
Sigfrido Tiñga	Lakas–NUCD–UMDP	808	0.48
Gregorio Maunahan	Independent	613	0.37
Rafael Dizon Jr.	Laban ng Makabayang Masang Pilipino	498	0.30
Damaso Flores	Nacionalista Party	176	0.10
Fidel Villegas	PDP–Laban	160	0.10
Total		167,649	100.00
Source: Commission on Elections

== Tarlac ==
=== Tarlac's 1st district ===
Incumbent Peping Cojuangco of Kabalikat ng Mamamayang Pilipino was term-limited. Gilbert Teodoro of the Nationalist People's Coalition won the election.

Candidate	Party	Votes	%
Gilbert Teodoro	Nationalist People's Coalition	95,548	72.38
Marcelino Aganon Jr.	Liberal Party	36,196	27.42
Isidro Luciano	PDP–Laban	257	0.19
Total		132,001	100.00
Source: Commission on Elections

=== Tarlac's 2nd district ===
Term-limited incumbent Jose Yap of Lakas–NUCD–UMDP ran for Governor of Tarlac. Lakas–NUCD–UMDP nominated Victor Yap, who was defeated by Benigno Aquino III of the Liberal Party.

Candidate	Party	Votes	%
Benigno Aquino III	Liberal Party	54,581	34.72
Victor Yap	Lakas–NUCD–UMDP	46,318	29.46
Susan Go	Independent	26,685	16.98
Filoteo Gozum	PDP–Laban	24,655	15.68
Norberto de Jesus	Partido para sa Demokratikong Reporma	3,144	2.00
Edilberto Zarraga	Nacionalista Party	1,683	1.07
Camilo Tiqui	Independent	99	0.06
Maria Theresa Brenda Tan	Independent	36	0.02
Total		157,201	100.00
Source: Commission on Elections

=== Tarlac's 3rd district ===
Term-limited incumbent Herminio Aquino of the Liberal Party ran for Vice Governor of Tarlac. Jesli Lapus of Lakas–NUCD–UMDP won the election.

Candidate	Party	Votes	%
Jesli Lapus	Lakas–NUCD–UMDP	39,601	36.87
Arnaldo Dizon	Lakas–NUCD–UMDP	35,321	32.89
Benito Gonzalez Jr.	Kabalikat ng Mamamayang Pilipino	14,945	13.92
Benjamin Lacson	PDP–Laban	12,582	11.72
Jose Castro	Independent	4,907	4.57
Eduardo Serrano	PDP–Laban	42	0.04
Total		107,398	100.00
Source: Commission on Elections

== Tawi-Tawi ==
Incumbent Nur Jaafar of Lakas–NUCD–UMDP was re-elected to a third term.

Candidate	Party	Votes	%
Nur Jaafar (incumbent)	Lakas–NUCD–UMDP	39,581	
Ismael Abubakar Jr.	Laban ng Makabayang Masang Pilipino		
Edgar Lim	Laban ng Makabayang Masang Pilipino		
Total			
Source: Commission on Elections

== Valenzuela ==
Term-limited incumbent Antonio Serapio of the Nationalist People's Coalition ran for Mayor of Valenzuela. Magi Gunigundo of Lakas–NUCD–UMDP won the election.

Candidate	Party	Votes	%
Magi Gunigundo	Lakas–NUCD–UMDP	56,078	33.26
Evelyn Hernandez	Liberal Party	53,425	31.69
Santiago de Guzman	Laban ng Makabayang Masang Pilipino	34,266	20.33
Eduardo Franco	Partido para sa Demokratikong Reporma	23,387	13.87
Jesus Mendoza	Independent	1,431	0.85
Total		168,587	100.00
Source: Commission on Elections

== Zambales ==
=== Zambales' 1st district ===
Incumbent James Gordon Jr. of Lakas–NUCD–UMDP was re-elected to a second term.

Candidate	Party	Votes	%
James Gordon Jr. (incumbent)	Lakas–NUCD–UMDP	85,104	67.55
Amethy Concepcion	Laban ng Makabayang Masang Pilipino	40,891	32.45
Total		125,995	100.00
Source: Commission on Elections

=== Zambales' 2nd district ===
Incumbent Antonio Diaz of Lakas–NUCD–UMDP was re-elected to a third term.

Candidate	Party	Votes	%
Antonio Diaz (incumbent)	Lakas–NUCD–UMDP	70,461	58.50
Amor Deloso	Lakas–NUCD–UMDP	48,478	40.25
George Misa	Independent	1,513	1.26
Total		120,452	100.00
Source: Commission on Elections

== Zamboanga City ==
Term-limited incumbent Maria Clara Lobregat of Laban ng Makabayang Masang Pilipino (LAMMP) ran for Mayor of Zamboanga City. The LAMMP nominated Celso Lobregat, who won the election.

Candidate	Party	Votes	%
Celso Lobregat	Laban ng Makabayang Masang Pilipino	80,421	57.99
Vitaliano Agan	Lakas–NUCD–UMDP	33,275	23.99
Reinerio Camins	Liberal Party	18,822	13.57
Alfredo Jimenez	PROMDI	4,616	3.33
Erwin Cesar Climaco	People's Reform Party	1,555	1.12
Total		138,689	100.00
Source: Commission on Elections

== Zamboanga del Norte ==
=== Zamboanga del Norte's 1st district ===
Incumbent Romeo Jalosjos Sr. of Laban ng Makabayang Masang Pilipino was re-elected to a second term.

Candidate	Party	Votes	%
Romeo Jalosjos Sr. (incumbent)	Laban ng Makabayang Masang Pilipino	44,726	55.00
Charissa Adasa	Lakas–NUCD–UMDP	32,802	40.34
Orlando Salatandre Jr.	Partido para sa Demokratikong Reporma	3,748	4.61
Manuel Sumbilon	Lakas–NUCD–UMDP	41	0.05
Total		81,317	100.00
Source: Commission on Elections

=== Zamboanga del Norte's 2nd district ===
Incumbent Cresente Llorente Jr. of Lakas–NUCD–UMDP ran for a second term, but was defeated by Roseller Barinaga of Laban ng Makabayang Masang Pilipino.

Candidate	Party	Votes	%
Roseller Barinaga	Laban ng Makabayang Masang Pilipino	64,025	60.26
Cresente Llorente Jr. (incumbent)	Lakas–NUCD–UMDP	42,153	39.68
Nurolhadi Mendoza	Lakas–NUCD–UMDP	62	0.06
Total		106,240	100.00
Source: Commission on Elections

=== Zamboanga del Norte's 3rd district ===
Incumbent Angel Carloto of Lakas–NUCD–UMDP was term-limited. Lakas–NUCD–UMDP nominated Angeles Carloto II, who won the election, and Jaime Lim.

Candidate	Party	Votes	%
Angeles Carloto II	Lakas–NUCD–UMDP	34,365	37.53
Jaime Lim	Lakas–NUCD–UMDP	28,826	31.48
Ireneo Galicia	Laban ng Makabayang Masang Pilipino	20,460	22.34
Mariano Candelaria Jr.	Partido para sa Demokratikong Reporma	7,920	8.65
Total		91,571	100.00
Source: Commission on Elections

== Zamboanga del Sur ==
=== Zamboanga del Sur's 1st district ===
Incumbent Alejandro Urro of Lakas–NUCD–UMDP was re-elected to a third term.

Candidate	Party	Votes	%
Alejandro Urro (incumbent)	Lakas–NUCD–UMDP	90,038	65.63
Ma. Lourdes Guillen	Laban ng Makabayang Masang Pilipino	45,603	33.24
Musa Malayang	Liberal Party	1,288	0.94
Elino Caba	Kilusang Bagong Lipunan	137	0.10
Porferia Preciado	Independent	127	0.09
Total		137,193	100.00
Source: Commission on Elections

=== Zamboanga del Sur's 2nd district ===
Incumbent Antonio Cerilles of Laban ng Makabayang Masang Pilipino (LAMMP) was term-limited. The LAMMP nominated Aurora E. Cerilles, who won the election.

Candidate	Party	Votes	%
Aurora E. Cerilles	Laban ng Makabayang Masang Pilipino	57,858	53.88
Filomena San Juan	Lakas–NUCD–UMDP	49,333	45.94
Amado Cabico	Kilusang Bagong Lipunan	196	0.18
Total		107,387	100.00
Source: Commission on Elections

=== Zamboanga del Sur's 3rd district ===
Incumbent Belma Cabilao of Lakas–NUCD–UMDP ran for a third term, but was defeated by George T. Hofer of Laban ng Makabayang Masang Pilipino.

Candidate	Party	Votes	%
George T. Hofer	Laban ng Makabayang Masang Pilipino	71,168	53.98
Belma Cabilao (incumbent)	Lakas–NUCD–UMDP	60,575	45.94
Florentino Ducusin Sr.	Kilusang Bagong Lipunan	107	0.08
Total		131,850	100.00
Source: Commission on Elections
