= 1988 Davao City local elections =

Philippine election

1988 Davao City mayoral election
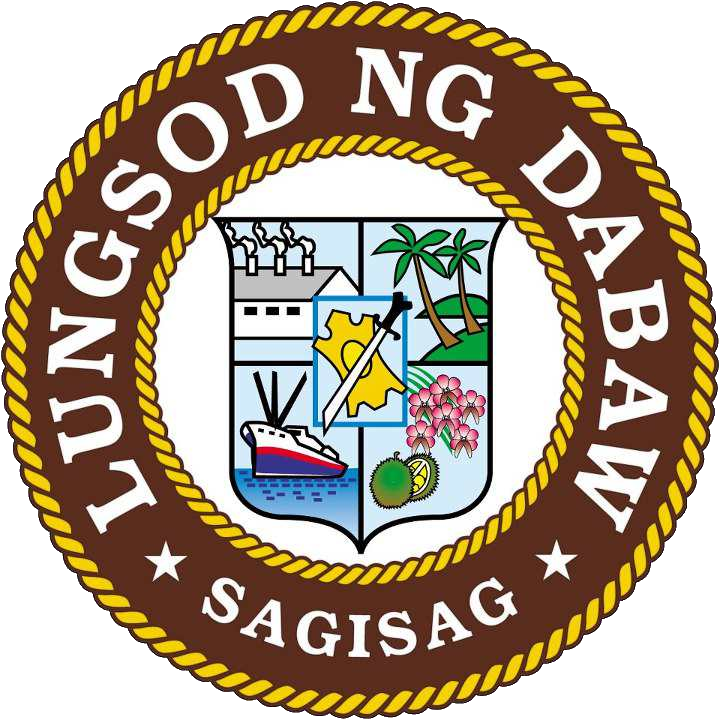
- January 18, 1988
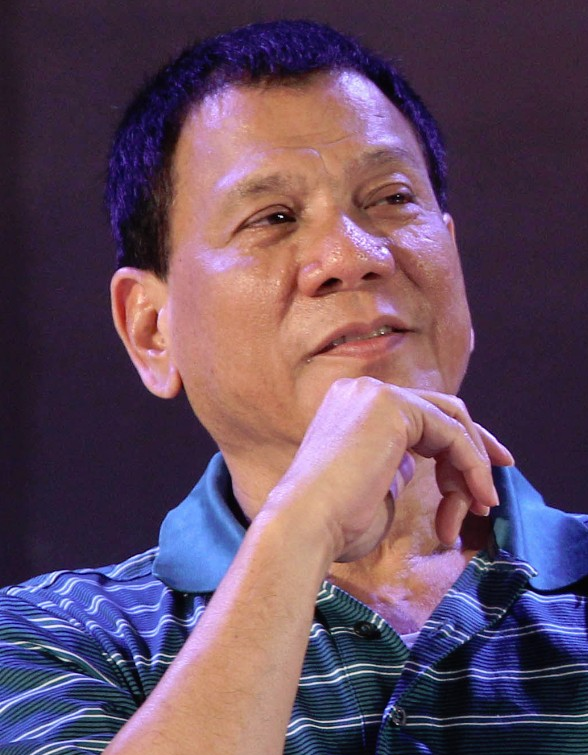

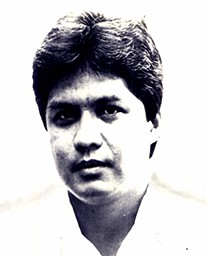
			IND
Candidate	Rodrigo Duterte	Zafiro Respicio	Jun Pala
Party	Independent	PDP–Laban	Independent
Alliance	Lakas ng Dabaw
Running mate	Carmelo Gempesaw	Dominador Zuño Jr.	Edmund Pamintuan
Popular vote	100,021	93,676	71,355
Percentage	36.94%	34.59%	26.35%
Mayor before election
Jacinto Rubillar Jr.
Lakas ng Bansa
Elected mayor
Rodrigo Duterte
Independent
- Vice mayoral election
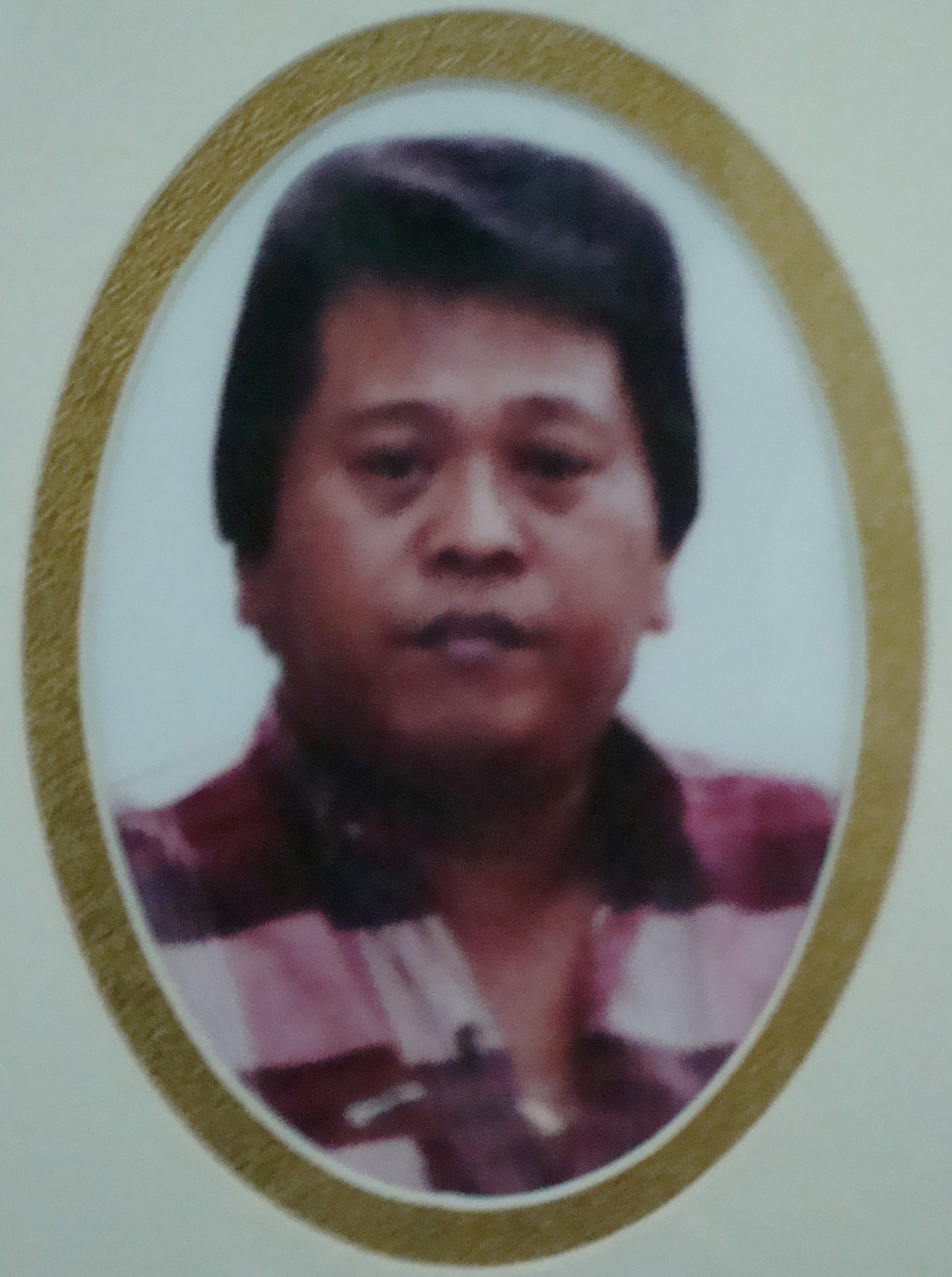

		IND
Candidate	Dominador Zuño Jr.	Carmelo Gempesaw	Edmund Pamintuan
Party	UNIDO	Independent	Anti-Communist Party of the Philippines
Alliance		Lakas ng Dabaw
Popular vote	163,404	51,681	31,600
Percentage	64.48%	20.39%	12.47%
Vice Mayor before election
Thelmo Dumadag
PDP–Laban
Elected Vice Mayor
Dominador Zuño Jr.
UNIDO

Local elections were held in Davao City on January 18, 1988, as part of the 1988 Philippine local elections. Elections for a new set of city officials were held under the new Constitution of the Philippines which was ratified in 1987.

The Lakas ng Dabaw nominee, former OIC Vice Mayor Rodrigo Duterte, defeated former OIC Mayor Zafiro Respicio of PDP–Laban and independent radio broadcaster Jun Pala.

== Background ==
After the EDSA People Power Revolution in 1986 which toppled dictator Ferdinand Marcos, President Corazon Aquino appointed opposition leader and former Assemblyman Zafiro Respicio as officer-in charge Mayor of Davao City, replacing Elias B. Lopez of the Nacionalista Party. Davao City Assistant City Prosecutor Rodrigo Duterte, a son of the late Davao Governor Vicente Duterte, was named OIC Vice Mayor. Respicio and Duterte both served until November 1987.

Respicio was heavily favored to win the mayoral election, while opposition figures in Davao City were in search of a viable candidate against Respicio. Aside from President Aquino, Respicio also had the full backing and endorsement of former mayor Luis Santos and businessman Jesus Ayala.

In 1987, Lakas ng Dabaw was organized as the major opposition coalition in Davao City. Former Senator Alejandro Almendras, a staunch pro-Marcos politician and Nacionalista stalwart, was one of its lead convenors along with other pro-Marcos figures such as Lopez and former Assemblyman Manuel Garcia.

Respicio filed his candidacy under PDP–Laban, which he co-founded in 1982 with Senator Nene Pimentel, with former city councilor Dominador Zuño Jr. as his running mate. Meanwhile, the Lakas ng Dabaw bloc nominated Duterte as its candidate for mayor. Duterte was initially reluctant to run, but he did so upon being convinced by Almendras and Lopez that he was the only opposition figure who could strongly challenge Respicio. Lawyer Carmelo Gempesaw was drafted as his running mate.

Jun Pala, a popular radio broadcaster and key spokesperson of the Alsa Masa vigilante group, also launched his bid for mayor as an independent. Pala named fellow anti-communist crusader Edmund Pamintuan as his candidate for vice mayor.

== Results ==
=== Mayor ===
Candidate	Party	Votes	%
Rodrigo Duterte	Independent	100,021	36.94
Zafiro Respicio	PDP–Laban	93,676	34.59
Jun Pala	Independent	71,355	26.35
Pedro Castillo	Independent	3,799	1.40
Elmer Isonza	Independent	1,939	0.72
Total		270,790	100.00

=== Vice mayor ===
Candidate	Party	Votes	%
Dominador Zuño Jr.	United Nationalist Democratic Organization	163,404	64.48
Carmelo Gempesaw	Independent	51,681	20.39
Edmund Pamintuan	Anti-Communist Party of the Philippines	31,600	12.47
Cipriano Villafuerte	Independent	6,721	2.65
Total		253,406	100.00

=== City Council ===
==== First District ====
Candidate	Party	Votes	%
Luis Bonguyan	Lakas ng Bansa	52,139	14.82
Bonifacio Militar	Liberal Party	48,347	13.74
Alexis Almendras	Nacionalista Party	48,012	13.65
Leonardo Avila III	Independent	46,243	13.14
Nilo Abellera	United Nationalist Democratic Organization	44,658	12.69
Aristeo Albay	Independent	38,174	10.85
Antonio Vergara	PDP–Laban	37,266	10.59
Gerardo Nograles	Independent	37,002	10.52
Total		351,841	100.00

==== Second District ====
Candidate	Party	Votes	%
Valentino Banzon	Nacionalista Party	48,069	18.23
Diosdado Mahipus	Independent	37,204	14.11
Tomas Monteverde	Nacionalista Party	36,769	13.95
Liborio Lumain	Lakas ng Bansa	31,318	11.88
Antonio Castillo	Independent	30,714	11.65
Danilo Dayanghirang	Lakas ng Bansa	27,569	10.46
Jaime Rodriguez	Lakas ng Bansa	26,785	10.16
Senforiano Alterado	Liberal Party	25,243	9.57
Total		263,671	100.00

==== Third District ====
Candidate	Party	Votes	%
Corazon Malanyaon	Lakas ng Bansa	32,204	19.25
Cesar Robillo	Independent	21,365	12.77
Renato Bangoy	Nacionalista Party	20,751	12.41
Agosto Fuentes	United Nationalist Democratic Organization	19,697	11.78
Victorio Advincula	Independent	19,679	11.76
Teofilo Venus	Lakas ng Bansa	18,892	11.29
Guillermo Saldaña	Lakas ng Bansa	17,347	10.37
Shane Dolor	Independent	17,333	10.36
Total		167,268	100.00
