= Davao City's at-large congressional district =

Legislative district of the Philippines

Davao City's at-large congressional district may refer to two occasions when a city-wide at-large district was used for elections to Philippine national legislatures from Davao City.

The district was first formed ahead of the 1943 Philippine legislative election following the ratification of the Second Philippine Republic constitution which called for a unicameral legislature composed of delegates from all provinces and chartered cities in the country. Davao, a chartered city since 1936, elected Celestino Chávez to the National Assembly, who was joined by then-mayor Alfonso Oboza as an appointed second delegate. The district became inactive following the restoration of the House of Representatives in 1945 when the city reverted to its old provincial constituency of Davao's at-large congressional district and its successor Davao del Sur's at-large congressional district.

The district was again utilized in the 1984 Philippine parliamentary election when Davao City was granted two seats in the Batasang Pambansa as a highly-urbanized city. After 1986, the city elected its representatives from three single-member congressional districts drawn under a new constitution.

== Representation history ==
#	Term of office		National Assembly	Seat A				Seat B			
#	Start	End	National Assembly	Image	Member	Party	Electoral history	Image	Member	Party	Electoral history
=== Davao City's at-large district for the National Assembly (Second Philippine Republic) ===
District created September 7, 1943.
–	September 25, 1943	February 2, 1944	1st		Celestino Chávez	KALIBAPI	Elected in 1943.		Alfonso G. Oboza	KALIBAPI	Appointed as an ex officio member.
#	Term of office		Batasang Pambansa	Seat A				Seat B			
#	Start	End	Batasang Pambansa	Image	Member	Party	Electoral history	Image	Member	Party	Electoral history
=== Davao City's at-large district for the Regular Batasang Pambansa ===
District re-created February 1, 1984.
–	July 23, 1984	March 25, 1986	2nd		Manuel M. Garcia	KBL	Elected in 1984.		Zafiro Respicio	PDP–Laban	Elected in 1984.
District dissolved into Davao City's 1st, 2nd and 3rd districts.

== See also ==
- Legislative districts of Davao City
