= Jun Pala =

Filipino journalist, columnist and pundit

The Honorable Jun Pala

Member of the Davao City Council from the 2nd district
- In office June 30, 1998 – June 30, 2001

Personal details
- Born: Juan Pajadora Pala Jr. July 17, 1954 Davao City, Philippines
- Died: September 6, 2003 (aged 49) Davao City, Philippines
- Cause of death: Murder
- Resting place: Buhangin Memorial Cemetery
- Party: Lakas (1998–2001)
- Other political affiliations: Independent (until 1998)
- Spouse: Louise Pala
- Children: 7
- Education: Holy Cross of Digos
- Occupation: Radio journalist and commentator

Juan Pajadora Pala Jr. (July 17, 1954 – September 6, 2003), popularly known as Jun Porras Pala or simply Jun Pala, was a Filipino journalist, columnist and pundit known for being the spokesperson of the Alsa Masa vigilante group in Davao City. He was killed in September 2003.

== Life and career ==
Pala was born on July 17, 1954 in Davao City. He spent his early years at Igpit and Tres de Mayo in Digos, Davao del Sur and studied at the Holy Cross of Digos.

Pala's professional career was first established when he became the main spokesperson for the Alsa Masa, an anti-communist vigilante group based in Davao City, in 1987. Alsa Masa was known for hunting down and killing members of the Communist Party of the Philippines and alleged corrupt politicians, and has also been blamed for human rights violations. He also hosted a public service radio program named Isumbong Mo Kay Pala (Complain to Pala) on DXGO-AM radio station in Davao City. His prominence led Pala to form another anti-communist group named Contra Force.

In the 1988 local elections, he ran for mayor of Davao City as an independent candidate, finishing third behind former OIC vice mayor Rodrigo Duterte and former OIC mayor Zafiro Respicio. In 1995, Pala leveraged his popularity to run for congressman of the city's second district, but he was defeated by then-congressman Manuel Garcia. Three years later, he ran and won a seat in the Davao City Council. He supported then-reelectionist mayor Benjamin de Guzman against the comebacking Duterte in the 2001 elections, but de Guzman lost the mayoral race to Duterte.

== Controversies ==
Pala's career was not without controversy. In the 1980s, Pala was met with a libel case and was suspended from his radio station for six months. After a six-month suspension, Pala was banned for life by the Kapisanan ng mga Brodkaster ng Pilipinas (KBP) for using inflammatory language while on air. With his influence and political connections and on the basis of his popularity, he was able to have the ban lifted.

During his later career, Pala aired critical commentaries against various government officials including Mayor Rodrigo Duterte and President Gloria Macapagal Arroyo. He had also exposed graft and corruption in the city involving some politicians. Nelly Castillo, one of Pala's colleagues, revealed that he admitted that he extorted money from politicians, businessmen and even his friends. However, according to Castillo, Pala's courage in exposing his own corrupt acts made him popular to his listeners.

== Death ==
On the evening of September 6, 2003, Pala was walking home from work along Davao Empress Subdivision in Panacan, Davao City when a riding-in-tandem fatally shot him in the chest four times. Pala's brother sustained minor injuries, while one of his bodyguards was also hit while attempting to wrestle the gunmen.

Prior to his death, Pala suffered two failed assassination attempts. The first attempt was in June 2001 while Pala was returning home from work when unknown gunmen fired at his taxi, grazing him in the neck. Soon after the failed ambush, Pala hired bodyguards to protect himself and his family from future attacks.

After surviving his first attempt, Pala continued to receive death threats at work. He was attacked once again by unknown gunmen in April 2003. According to his wife Louise, the second attempt on his life forced Pala to record his radio program from home via telephone. Although this was the safer option for Pala, he still preferred conducting his radio show from the studio booth.

In 2016, an alleged former hitman in Davao City linked President Rodrigo Duterte to the death squad that carried out Pala's murder while Duterte was mayor of Davao City. The Duterte administration denied the allegations.

== See also ==
- Communist rebellion in the Philippines
- DXUM
- List of journalists killed under the Arroyo administration
