= Davao City's 3rd congressional district =

Legislative district of the Philippines

- Constituency for the House of Representatives of the Philippines
- Map
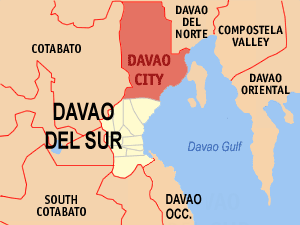
- Location of Davao City within the Davao Region
- City: Davao City
- Region: Davao Region
- Population: 524,062 (2020)
- Electorate: 307,835 (2025)
- Major settlements: 82 barangays: Barangays; Baguio (8 barangays); Calinan (19 barangays); Marilog (12 barangays); Toril (25 barangays); Tugbok (18 barangays)
- Area: 1,298.97 km^{2} (501.54 sq mi)

Current constituency
- Created: 1987
- Representative: Isidro Ungab
- Political party: HTL
- Congressional bloc: Independent

Davao City's 3rd congressional district is one of the three congressional districts of the Philippines in Davao City. It has been represented in the House of Representatives since 1987. The district covers five city districts located to the west and southwest of the city's poblacion or downtown commercial area, namely Baguio, Calinan, Marilog, Toril and Tugbok. It is currently represented in the 20th Congress by Isidro Ungab of the Hugpong sa Tawong Lungsod (HTL).

== Representation history ==
#	Image	Member	Term of office		Congress	Party	Electoral history	Constituent LGUs
#	Image	Member	Start	End	Congress	Party	Electoral history	Constituent LGUs
=== Davao City's 3rd district for the House of Representatives of the Philippines ===
District created February 2, 1987 from Davao City's at-large district.
1		Luis T. Santos	June 30, 1987	October 27, 1987	8th	LnB	Elected in 1987. Resigned on appointment as Secretary of Local Government.	1987–present Baguio, Calinan, Marilog, Toril and Tugbok
—	vacant		October 27, 1987	June 30, 1992	8th	–	No special election held to fill vacancy.	1987–present Baguio, Calinan, Marilog, Toril and Tugbok
2		Elias B. Lopez	June 30, 1992	September 1997	9th	NPC	Elected in 1992.	1987–present Baguio, Calinan, Marilog, Toril and Tugbok
2		Elias B. Lopez	June 30, 1992	September 1997	10th	NPC	Re-elected in 1995. Died.	1987–present Baguio, Calinan, Marilog, Toril and Tugbok
3		Ruy Elias C. Lopez	June 30, 1998	June 30, 2007	11th	LAMMP	Elected in 1998.	1987–present Baguio, Calinan, Marilog, Toril and Tugbok
3		Ruy Elias C. Lopez	June 30, 1998	June 30, 2007	12th	NPC	Re-elected in 2001.	1987–present Baguio, Calinan, Marilog, Toril and Tugbok
3		Ruy Elias C. Lopez	June 30, 1998	June 30, 2007	13th	NPC	Re-elected in 2004.	1987–present Baguio, Calinan, Marilog, Toril and Tugbok
4		Isidro Ungab	June 30, 2007	June 30, 2016	14th	PMP	Elected in 2007.	1987–present Baguio, Calinan, Marilog, Toril and Tugbok
4		Isidro Ungab	June 30, 2007	June 30, 2016	15th	Liberal	Re-elected in 2010.	1987–present Baguio, Calinan, Marilog, Toril and Tugbok
4		Isidro Ungab	June 30, 2007	June 30, 2016	16th	Liberal	Re-elected in 2013.	1987–present Baguio, Calinan, Marilog, Toril and Tugbok
5		Alberto T. Ungab	June 30, 2016	June 30, 2019	17th	HNP	Elected in 2016.	1987–present Baguio, Calinan, Marilog, Toril and Tugbok
(4)		Isidro Ungab	June 30, 2019	Incumbent	18th	HNP	Elected in 2019.	1987–present Baguio, Calinan, Marilog, Toril and Tugbok
(4)		Isidro Ungab	June 30, 2019	Incumbent	19th	Lakas	Re-elected in 2022.	1987–present Baguio, Calinan, Marilog, Toril and Tugbok
(4)		Isidro Ungab	June 30, 2019	Incumbent	20th	HTL	Re-elected in 2025.	1987–present Baguio, Calinan, Marilog, Toril and Tugbok

== Election results ==
=== 2025 ===
Candidate	Party	Votes	%
Isidro Ungab (incumbent)	Hugpong sa Tawong Lungsod	178,721	77.57
Nonoy Al-ag	Lakas–CMD	30,687	13.32
Ruy Elias Lopez	Partido Federal ng Pilipinas	19,243	8.35
Lito Monreal	Independent	1,133	0.49
Dindo Plaza	Independent	612	0.27
Total		230,396	100.00
Registered voters/turnout		307,835	–
Hugpong sa Tawong Lungsod hold			
Source: Commission on Elections

=== 2022 ===
2022 Philippine House of Representatives elections
Party	Candidate	Votes	%
Hugpong	Isidro Ungab (incumbent)	175,314	
Independent	Abundio Indonila	3,873	
Total votes			100.00
Hugpong hold			

=== 2019 ===
2019 Philippine House of Representatives elections
Party	Candidate	Votes	%
Hugpong	Isidro Ungab	160,732	100.00
Total votes		160,732	100.00
Hugpong hold			

=== 1987 ===
1987 Philippine House of Representatives elections
Party	Candidate	Votes	%
LnB	Luis Santos	38,147	49.36
Nacionalista	Elias B. Lopez	34,029	44.03
Independent	Leonilo Claudio	3,049	3.95
UNIDO	Agosto Fuentes	2,059	2.66
Total votes		77,284	100.00

== See also ==
- Legislative districts of Davao City
