= Tugung =

Tugung is a surname. Notable people with the surname include:

- Bob Tugung (1939–1986), Filipino teacher
- Elnorita Tugung (1939–2020), Filipino politician
