= Results of the 1995 Philippine House of Representatives elections =

The following are the results of the 1995 Philippine House of Representatives elections by legislative district.

== Abra ==
Incumbent Jeremias Zapata of Lakas–NUCD–UMDP was re-elected to a second term.

Candidate	Party	Votes	%
Jeremias Zapata (incumbent)	Lakas–NUCD–UMDP	54,823	74.02
Dionisio Tejero	Independent	12,719	17.17
Gil Valera	Nationalist People's Coalition	6,523	8.81
Total		74,065	100.00
Source: Commission on Elections

== Agusan del Norte ==
=== Agusan del Norte's 1st district ===
Incumbent Charito Plaza of Lakas–NUCD–UMDP was re-elected to a third term.

Candidate	Party	Votes	%
Charito Plaza (incumbent)	Lakas–NUCD–UMDP	48,268	54.55
Emmanuel Balanon	Laban ng Demokratikong Pilipino	33,422	37.77
Carlito Tan	Independent	5,537	6.26
Jose Cuevas	Independent	1,259	1.42
Total		88,486	100.00
Source: Commission on Elections

=== Agusan del Norte's 2nd district ===
Incumbent Edelmiro Amante of Lakas–NUCD–UMDP retired. Lakas–NUCD–UMDP nominated Eduardo Rama Sr., who won the election.

Candidate	Party	Votes	%
Eduardo Rama Sr.	Lakas–NUCD–UMDP	44,048	60.20
Roberto Aquino	Laban ng Demokratikong Pilipino	29,119	39.80
Total		73,167	100.00
Source: Commission on Elections

== Agusan del Sur ==
Incumbent Ceferino Paredes Jr. of Lakas–NUCD–UMDP was re-elected to a second term.

Candidate	Party	Votes	%
Ceferino Paredes Jr. (incumbent)	Lakas–NUCD–UMDP	55,820	49.51
Generoso Sansaet	Laban ng Demokratikong Pilipino	55,147	48.91
Dominador Calonia	Nacionalista Party	1,778	1.58
Total		112,745	100.00
Source: Commission on Elections

== Aklan ==
Incumbent Allan Quimpo of Lakas–NUCD–UMDP was re-elected to a second term.

Candidate	Party	Votes	%
Allen Quimpo (incumbent)	Lakas–NUCD–UMDP	89,674	58.26
Edmundo Tolentino	Lakas–NUCD–UMDP	61,992	40.27
Jose Tumbokon	Nationalist People's Coalition	2,257	1.47
Total		153,923	100.00
Source: Commission on Elections

== Albay ==
=== Albay's 1st district ===
Incumbent Edcel Lagman of Laban ng Demokratikong Pilipino was re-elected to a third term.

Candidate	Party	Votes	%
Edcel Lagman (incumbent)	Laban ng Demokratikong Pilipino	57,939	57.59
Jesus Calisin	Lakas–NUCD–UMDP	42,548	42.29
Jose Bolo	Independent	113	0.11
Total		100,600	100.00
Source: Commission on Elections

=== Albay's 2nd district ===
Incumbent Carlos R. Imperial of the Nationalist People's Coalition was re-elected to a third term.

Candidate	Party	Votes	%
Carlos R. Imperial (incumbent)	Nationalist People's Coalition	50,379	48.17
Benito Se	Lakas–NUCD–UMDP	29,772	28.47
Pedro Marcellana Jr.	PDP–Laban	24,076	23.02
Gilbert Calleja	Independent	356	0.34
Total		104,583	100.00
Source: Commission on Elections

=== Albay's 3rd district ===
Incumbent Al Francis Bichara of Lakas–NUCD–UMDP ran for Governor of Albay. Romeo Salalima of the Nationalist People's Coalition won the election.

Candidate	Party	Votes	%
Romeo Salalima	Nationalist People's Coalition	61,926	62.23
Benjamin Matias	Independent	21,363	21.47
Pedro Sabido Jr.	PDP–Laban	16,228	16.31
Total		99,517	100.00
Source: Commission on Elections

== Antique ==
Incumbent Exequiel Javier of Lakas–NUCD–UMDP was re-elected to a third term.

Candidate	Party	Votes	%
Exequiel Javier (incumbent)	Lakas–NUCD–UMDP	78,776	55.41
Salvacion Perez	Laban ng Demokratikong Pilipino	40,398	28.42
Arturo Pacificador	Independent	18,081	12.72
Florante Villaflor Jr.	PDP–Laban	2,500	1.76
Narzal Mallares	None	2,403	1.69
Total		142,158	100.00
Source: Commission on Elections

== Aurora ==
Incumbent Benedicto Miran of Lakas–NUCD–UMDP ran for a third term, but was defeated by Bella Angara of Lakas–NUCD–UMDP.

Candidate	Party	Votes	%
Bella Angara	Lakas–NUCD–UMDP	33,831	66.03
Benedicto Miran (incumbent)	Lakas–NUCD–UMDP	17,408	33.97
Total		51,239	100.00
Source: Commission on Elections

== Bacolod ==
Incumbent Romeo Guanzon of Lakas–NUCD–UMDP won re-election to a third term.

Candidate	Party	Votes	%
Romeo Guanzon (incumbent)	Lakas–NUCD–UMDP	62,917	47.17
Alfredo Montelibano Jr.	Independent	59,418	44.55
Wilson Gamboa	Independent	10,869	8.15
Jack Villaflor	Independent	181	0.14
Total		133,385	100.00
Source: Commission on Elections

== Baguio ==
Incumbent Bernardo Vergara of Lakas–NUCD–UMDP was re-elected to a second term.

Candidate	Party	Votes	%
Bernardo Vergara (incumbent)	Lakas–NUCD–UMDP	48,535	95.35
Zosimo Paredes	Nationalist People's Coalition	1,431	2.81
Honorato Aquino	Laban ng Demokratikong Pilipino	914	1.80
Felipe Ramos	Independent	23	0.05
Total		50,903	100.00
Source: Commission on Elections

== Basilan ==
Incumbent Elnorita Tugung of Lakas–NUCD–UMDP ran for a second term, but was defeated by Candu Muarip of Laban ng Demokratikong Pilipino.

Candidate	Party	Votes	%
Candu Muarip	Laban ng Demokratikong Pilipino	37,688	42.54
Louis Alano	Nationalist People's Coalition	27,478	31.02
Elnorita Tugung (incumbent)	Lakas–NUCD–UMDP	20,430	23.06
Mohd Yamani Habib Carama	Independent	2,993	3.38
Total		88,589	100.00
Source: Commission on Elections

== Bataan ==
=== Bataan's 1st district ===
Incumbent Felicito Payumo of the Liberal Party was re-elected to a third term unopposed.

Candidate	Party	Votes	%
Felicito Payumo (incumbent)	Liberal Party	60,748	100.00
Total		60,748	100.00
Source: Commission on Elections

=== Bataan's 2nd district ===
Incumbent Dominador Venegas of Lakas–NUCD–UMDP ran for a second term, but was defeated by Tet Garcia of the Nationalist People's Coalition.

Candidate	Party	Votes	%
Tet Garcia	Nationalist People's Coalition	47,607	45.94
Dominador Venegas (incumbent)	Lakas–NUCD–UMDP	46,213	44.59
Norberto Gonzales	Partido Demokratiko Sosyalista ng Pilipinas	7,563	7.30
Gregory Francis Banzon	Liberal Party	2,256	2.18
Total		103,639	100.00
Source: Commission on Elections

== Batanes ==
Incumbent Enrique Lizardo of Lakas–NUCD–UMDP ran for a second term, but was defeated by Florencio Abad of the Liberal Party.

Candidate	Party	Votes	%
Florencio Abad	Liberal Party	3,354	53.32
Enrique Lizardo (incumbent)	Lakas–NUCD–UMDP	2,936	46.68
Total		6,290	100.00
Source: Commission on Elections

== Batangas ==
=== Batangas' 1st district ===
Incumbent Eduardo Ermita of Lakas–NUCD–UMDP was re-elected to a second term unopposed.

Candidate	Party	Votes	%
Eduardo Ermita (incumbent)	Lakas–NUCD–UMDP	103,624	100.00
Total		103,624	100.00
Source: Commission on Elections

=== Batangas' 2nd district ===
Incumbent Hernando Perez of Laban ng Demokratikong Pilipino was re-elected to a third term.

Candidate	Party	Votes	%
Hernando Perez (incumbent)	Laban ng Demokratikong Pilipino	116,607	96.99
Luis Gutierrez	Independent	3,613	3.01
Total		120,220	100.00
Source: Commission on Elections

=== Batangas' 3rd district ===
Incumbent Milagros Trinidad of the Nacionalista Party was re-elected to a third term.

Candidate	Party	Votes	%
Milagros Trinidad (incumbent)	Nationalist People's Coalition	83,352	72.86
Dante Carandang	Lapiang Manggagawa	31,041	27.14
Total		114,393	100.00
Source: Commission on Elections

=== Batangas' 4th district ===
Incumbent Ralph Recto of Lakas–NUCD–UMDP was re-elected to a second term.

Candidate	Party	Votes	%
Ralph Recto (incumbent)	Lakas–NUCD–UMDP	148,770	96.17
Jose Dimayuga	Independent	5,920	3.83
Total		154,690	100.00
Source: Commission on Elections

== Benguet ==
Incumbent Samuel Dangwa of Lakas–NUCD–UMDP ran for a third term, but was defeated by Ronald Cosalan of Lakas–NUCD–UMDP.

Candidate	Party	Votes	%
Ronald Cosalan	Lakas–NUCD–UMDP	50,544	51.10
Samuel Dangwa (incumbent)	Lakas–NUCD–UMDP	45,487	45.99
Julio Bantali	Independent	2,674	2.70
Diosdado Ringor	Independent	135	0.14
Bedis Guznian	Lapiang Manggagawa	63	0.06
Total		98,903	100.00
Source: Commission on Elections

== Biliran ==
Biliran's lone district was created on October 10, 1991, from Leyte's 3rd district. Gerardo Espina of the Nationalist People's Coalition won the election.

Candidate	Party	Votes	%
Gerardo Espina	Nationalist People's Coalition	16,029	35.47
Amelia Jaro	Lakas–NUCD–UMDP	14,836	32.83
David Corpin	Lakas–NUCD–UMDP	10,972	24.28
Gabino Velasquez Jr.	People's Reform Party	2,937	6.50
Benjamin Diu Jr.	Nacionalista Party	235	0.52
Nilo Bacolod	Kilusang Bagong Lipunan	184	0.41
Total		45,193	100.00
Source: Commission on Elections

== Bohol ==
=== Bohol's 1st district ===
Incumbent Venice Agana of Lakas–NUCD–UMDP was re-elected to a third term.

Candidate	Party	Votes	%
Venice Agana (incumbent)	Lakas–NUCD–UMDP	48,958	43.18
Dan Lim	Laban ng Demokratikong Pilipino	41,734	36.81
Rolando Butalid	Nationalist People's Coalition	22,616	19.95
Cirilo Niño Hormachuelos	Independent	61	0.05
Total		113,369	100.00
Source: Commission on Elections

=== Bohol's 2nd district ===
Incumbent Erico Aumentado of Lakas–NUCD–UMDP was re-elected to a second term.

Candidate	Party	Votes	%
Erico Aumentado (incumbent)	Lakas–NUCD–UMDP	71,804	97.88
Eliezer Nuñez	Independent	1,552	2.12
Total		73,356	100.00
Source: Commission on Elections

=== Bohol's 3rd district ===
Incumbent Isidro Zarraga of Lakas–NUCD–UMDP was re-elected to a third term.

Candidate	Party	Votes	%
Isidro Zarraga (incumbent)	Lakas–NUCD–UMDP	96,632	98.29
Pedro Barrientos	Lapiang Manggagawa	1,686	1.71
Total		98,318	100.00
Source: Commission on Elections

== Bukidnon ==
=== Bukidnon's 1st district ===
Incumbent Socorro Acosta of Lakas–NUCD–UMDP was re-elected to a third term.

Candidate	Party	Votes	%
Socorro Acosta (incumbent)	Lakas–NUCD–UMDP	57,537	91.16
Juan Artajo	Nationalist People's Coalition	5,580	8.84
Total		63,117	100.00
Source: Commission on Elections

=== Bukidnon's 2nd district ===
Incumbent Reginaldo Tilanduca of Lakas–NUCD–UMDP was re-elected to a second term.

Candidate	Party	Votes	%
Reginaldo Tilanduca (incumbent)	Lakas–NUCD–UMDP	48,788	56.03
Vicente Polinar	Nationalist People's Coalition	29,547	33.93
Lorenzo Dinlayan Sr.	Independent	8,744	10.04
Total		87,079	100.00
Source: Commission on Elections

=== Bukidnon's 3rd district ===
Incumbent Jose Maria Zubiri Jr. of Lakas–NUCD–UMDP was re-elected to a third term unopposed.

Candidate	Party	Votes	%
Jose Maria Zubiri Jr. (incumbent)	Lakas–NUCD–UMDP	68,857	100.00
Total		68,857	100.00
Source: Commission on Elections

== Bulacan ==
=== Bulacan's 1st district ===
Incumbent Teodulo Natividad of Lakas–NUCD–UMDP was re-elected to a second term.

Candidate	Party	Votes	%
Teodulo Natividad (incumbent)	Lakas–NUCD–UMDP	107,603	75.75
Victorino Aldaba	Nationalist People's Coalition	34,128	24.02
Emmanuel Feliciano	Independent	205	0.14
Ramon Crisostomo	Partido Nacionalista ng Pilipinas	123	0.09
Total		142,059	100.00
Source: Commission on Elections

=== Bulacan's 2nd district ===
Incumbent Pedro Pancho of Lakas–NUCD–UMDP was re-elected to a second term.

Candidate	Party	Votes	%
Pedro Pancho (incumbent)	Lakas–NUCD–UMDP	92,383	60.74
Vicente Rivera Jr.	Partido ng Masang Pilipino	47,525	31.25
Santiago Morante	People's Reform Party	12,192	8.02
Total		152,100	100.00
Source: Commission on Elections

=== Bulacan's 3rd district ===
Incumbent Ricardo Silverio of Lakas–NUCD–UMDP was re-elected to a second term.

Candidate	Party	Votes	%
Ricardo Silverio (incumbent)	Lakas–NUCD–UMDP	62,502	54.81
Jose Cabochan	Lakas–NUCD–UMDP	51,528	45.19
Total		114,030	100.00
Source: Commission on Elections

=== Bulacan's 4th district ===
Incumbent Angelito Sarmiento of Lakas–NUCD–UMDP was re-elected to a second term.

Candidate	Party	Votes	%
Angelito Sarmiento (incumbent)	Lakas–NUCD–UMDP	109,007	67.02
Jesus Salvador Rodriguez	Nationalist People's Coalition	53,650	32.98
Total		162,657	100.00
Source: Commission on Elections

== Cagayan ==
=== Cagayan's 1st district ===
Incumbent Juan Ponce Enrile, an independent, retired to run for the Senate. Patricio Antonio of Lakas–NUCD–UMDP won the election.

Candidate	Party	Votes	%
Patricio Antonio	Lakas–NUCD–UMDP	57,763	65.42
Felito Ramirez	Laban ng Demokratikong Pilipino	29,262	33.14
Macario Aggarao	Laban ng Demokratikong Pilipino	1,272	1.44
Total		88,297	100.00
Source: Commission on Elections

=== Cagayan's 2nd district ===
Incumbent Edgar Lara of the Nationalist People's Coalition was re-elected to a second term.

Candidate	Party	Votes	%
Edgar Lara (incumbent)	Nationalist People's Coalition	60,485	85.15
Leoncio Puzon	Lakas–NUCD–UMDP	10,269	14.46
Pacifico Monje	Independent	276	0.39
Total		71,030	100.00
Source: Commission on Elections

=== Cagayan's 3rd district ===
Incumbent Francisco Mamba of Lakas–NUCD–UMDP retired. Lakas–NUCD–UMDP nominated Manuel Mamba, who won the election.

Candidate	Party	Votes	%
Manuel Mamba	Lakas–NUCD–UMDP	37,981	37.59
Oscar Pagulayan	Laban ng Demokratikong Pilipino	32,238	31.91
Vicente Valdepeñas Jr.	Liberal Party	14,462	14.31
Raphael Ting	Independent	10,607	10.50
Orlando Molina	People's Reform Party	5,742	5.68
Total		101,030	100.00
Source: Commission on Elections

== Cagayan de Oro ==
Incumbent Erasmo Damasing of PDP–Laban was re-elected to a second term.

Candidate	Party	Votes	%
Erasmo Damasing (incumbent)	PDP–Laban	79,613	69.50
Eddie Tomondong	Independent	26,969	23.54
Remedios Llego	Independent	7,644	6.67
Ernesto Padernos	Independent	323	0.28
Total		114,549	100.00
Source: Commission on Elections

== Caloocan ==
=== Caloocan's 1st district ===
Incumbent Aurora Henson of the Nationalist People's Coalition ran for a second term, but was defeated by Bobby Guanzon of Lakas–NUCD–UMDP.

Candidate	Party	Votes	%
Bobby Guanzon	Lakas–NUCD–UMDP	69,281	58.70
Aurora Henson (incumbent)	Nationalist People's Coalition	46,265	39.20
Ernesto Adalem	Laban ng Demokratikong Pilipino	2,328	1.97
Aproniano Camba	Independent	145	0.12
Total		118,019	100.00
Source: Commission on Elections

=== Caloocan's 2nd district ===
Incumbent Luis Asistio of the Nationalist People's Coalition was re-elected to a second term.

Candidate	Party	Votes	%
Luis Asistio (incumbent)	Nationalist People's Coalition	55,405	60.08
Virgilio Robles	Lakas–NUCD–UMDP	32,812	35.58
Carmelito Montano	Independent	4,003	4.34
Total		92,220	100.00
Source: Commission on Elections

== Camarines Norte ==
Incumbent Emmanuel Pimentel of the Nationalist People's Coalition was re-elected to a second term.

Candidate	Party	Votes	%
Emmanuel Pimentel (incumbent)	Nationalist People's Coalition	43,215	33.15
Renato Unico	Laban ng Demokratikong Pilipino	37,411	28.70
Winifredo Oco	Lakas–NUCD–UMDP	35,328	27.10
Renato Verzo	Nacionalista Party	6,214	4.77
Doroteo Cañeba	Independent	6,132	4.70
Edwin Ferrer Sr.	Independent	1,294	0.99
Luis Dictado	Partido ng Masang Pilipino	773	0.59
Total		130,367	100.00
Source: Commission on Elections

== Camarines Sur ==
=== Camarines Sur's 1st district ===
Incumbent Rolando Andaya of Lakas–NUCD–UMDP was re-elected to a third term.

Candidate	Party	Votes	%
Rolando Andaya (incumbent)	Lakas–NUCD–UMDP	84,793	92.62
Redentor Castañeda	Laban ng Demokratikong Pilipino	6,621	7.23
Anacleto de Ocampo III	Independent	131	0.14
Total		91,545	100.00
Source: Commission on Elections

=== Camarines Sur's 2nd district ===
Incumbent Celso Baguio of Lakas–NUCD–UMDP ran for a second term, but was defeated by Leopoldo San Buenaventura of PDP–Laban.

Candidate	Party	Votes	%
Leopoldo San Buenaventura	PDP–Laban	51,752	45.63
Celso Baguio (incumbent)	Lakas–NUCD–UMDP	46,807	41.27
Agapito Tria	Lakas–NUCD–UMDP	10,517	9.27
Rodolfo Fortuno	Independent	4,333	3.82
Total		113,409	100.00
Source: Commission on Elections

=== Camarines Sur's 3rd district ===
Incumbent Arnulfo Fuentebella of the Nationalist People's Coalition was re-elected to a second term.

Candidate	Party	Votes	%
Arnulfo Fuentebella (incumbent)	Nationalist People's Coalition	46,848	55.53
Ernesto Pilapil	Lakas–NUCD–UMDP	21,150	25.07
Amador Simando	Laban ng Demokratikong Pilipino	13,958	16.55
Eden Balcueva	Independent	2,405	2.85
Total		84,361	100.00
Source: Commission on Elections

=== Camarines Sur's 4th district ===
Incumbent Ciriaco Alfelor of the Liberal was re-elected to a third term.

Candidate	Party	Votes	%
Ciriaco Alfelor (incumbent)	Liberal Party	61,822	58.80
Melquiades Gaite	Laban ng Demokratikong Pilipino	42,557	40.48
Mariano Trinidad	People's Reform Party	761	0.72
Total		105,140	100.00
Source: Commission on Elections

== Camiguin ==
Incumbent Pedro Romualdo of Lakas–NUCD–UMDP was re-elected to a third term.

Candidate	Party	Votes	%
Pedro Romualdo (incumbent)	Lakas–NUCD–UMDP	17,307	50.49
Homobono Adaza	Nacionalista Party	16,970	49.51
Total		34,277	100.00
Source: Commission on Elections

== Capiz ==
=== Capiz' 1st district ===
Incumbent Mar Roxas of the Liberal Party was elected on August 30, 1993, to succeed Gerardo Roxas Jr. of the Liberal Party, who died on April 4, 1993. Mar Roxas was elected to a full term unopposed.

Candidate	Party	Votes	%
Mar Roxas (incumbent)	Liberal Party	80,369	100.00
Total		80,369	100.00
Source: Commission on Elections

=== Capiz' 2nd district ===
Incumbent Vicente Andaya Jr. of Lakas–NUCD–UMDP was re-elected to a second term.

Candidate	Party	Votes	%
Vicente Andaya Jr. (incumbent)	Lakas–NUCD–UMDP	75,191	73.90
Eduardo Kapunan Jr.	Lakas–NUCD–UMDP	26,446	25.99
Manuel Supetran	Independent	105	0.10
Total		101,742	100.00
Source: Commission on Elections

== Catanduanes ==
Incumbent Leandro Verceles Jr. of Lakas–NUCD–UMDP was re-elected to a second term.

Candidate	Party	Votes	%
Leandro Verceles Jr. (incumbent)	Lakas–NUCD–UMDP	56,620	81.04
Jose Alberto Jr.	Independent	11,987	17.16
Apolonio Reyes	Nationalist People's Coalition	875	1.25
Luis Sorreta	Independent	301	0.43
Justo Evangelista	Independent	80	0.11
Total		69,863	100.00
Source: Commission on Elections

== Cavite ==
=== Cavite's 1st district ===
Incumbent Dominador Nazareno Jr. of Lakas–NUCD–UMDP ran for a second term, but was defeated by Plaridel Abaya of the Nationalist People's Coalition.

Candidate	Party	Votes	%
Plaridel Abaya	Nationalist People's Coalition	58,043	39.40
Dominador Nazareno Jr. (incumbent)	Lakas–NUCD–UMDP	51,892	35.23
Osmundo Umali	Nacionalista Party	19,823	13.46
Ramon Esguerra	Independent	13,735	9.32
Myrna Santiago	Liberal Party	2,664	1.81
Samuel Gabot	Independent	742	0.50
Restituto Ledesma	People's Reform Party	401	0.27
Total		147,300	100.00
Source: Commission on Elections

=== Cavite's 2nd district ===
Incumbent Renato Dragon of Laban ng Demokratikong Pilipino was re-elected to a third term.

Candidate	Party	Votes	%
Renato Dragon (incumbent)	Laban ng Demokratikong Pilipino	99,329	57.80
Amado Fojas	Liberal Party	72,534	42.20
Total		171,863	100.00
Source: Commission on Elections

=== Cavite's 3rd district ===
Incumbent Telesforo Unas of Laban ng Demokratikong Pilipino was re-elected to a second term.

Candidate	Party	Votes	%
Telesforo Unas (incumbent)	Laban ng Demokratikong Pilipino	64,474	54.97
Antonio Poblete	Lapiang Manggagawa	40,741	34.74
Jorge Nuñez	Independent	11,806	10.07
Romeo Roxas	Independent	262	0.22
Total		117,283	100.00
Source: Commission on Elections

== Cebu ==
=== Cebu's 1st district ===
Incumbent Eduardo Gullas of Lakas–NUCD–UMDP was re-elected to a second term.

Candidate	Party	Votes	%
Eduardo Gullas (incumbent)	Lakas–NUCD–UMDP	92,076	86.43
Miguel Enriquez Jr.	Independent	14,459	13.57
Total		106,535	100.00
Source: Commission on Elections

=== Cebu's 2nd district ===
Incumbent Crisologo Abines of Laban ng Demokratikong Pilipino was re-elected to a third term.

Candidate	Party	Votes	%
Crisologo Abines (incumbent)	Lakas–NUCD–UMDP	70,973	66.48
Oliveros Kintanar	Nationalist People's Coalition	20,151	18.88
Delano Tecson	Lakas–NUCD–UMDP	15,631	14.64
Total		106,755	100.00
Source: Commission on Elections

=== Cebu's 3rd district ===
Incumbent Pablo P. Garcia of Lakas–NUCD–UMDP retired to run for Governor of Cebu. John Henry Osmeña of Laban ng Demokratikong Pilipino won the election.

Candidate	Party	Votes	%
John Henry Osmeña	Laban ng Demokratikong Pilipino	86,627	97.21
Eufronio Son	Independent	1,901	2.13
Julito Zosa	Independent	588	0.66
Total		89,116	100.00
Source: Commission on Elections

=== Cebu's 4th district ===
Incumbent Celestino Martinez Jr. of the Nationalist People's Coalition was re-elected to a third term unopposed.

Candidate	Party	Votes	%
Celestino Martinez Jr. (incumbent)	Nationalist People's Coalition	76,685	100.00
Total		76,685	100.00
Source: Commission on Elections

=== Cebu's 5th district ===
Incumbent Ramon Durano III of Lakas–NUCD–UMDP was re-elected to a third term unopposed.

Candidate	Party	Votes	%
Ramon Durano III (incumbent)	Lakas–NUCD–UMDP	101,255	100.00
Total		101,255	100.00
Source: Commission on Elections

=== Cebu's 6th district ===
Incumbent Nerissa Soon-Ruiz of Lakas–NUCD–UMDP was re-elected to a second term.

Candidate	Party	Votes	%
Nerissa Soon-Ruiz (incumbent)	Lakas–NUCD–UMDP	94,489	65.37
Manuel Cantos	Independent	29,969	20.73
Dindo Antonio Perez	Nationalist People's Coalition	20,085	13.90
Total		144,543	100.00
Source: Commission on Elections

== Cebu City ==
=== Cebu City's 1st district ===
Incumbent Raul del Mar of Lakas–NUCD–UMDP was re-elected to a third term.

Candidate	Party	Votes	%
Raul del Mar (incumbent)	Lakas–NUCD–UMDP	87,000	
Total			
Source: Commission on Elections

=== Cebu City's 2nd district ===
Incumbent Antonio Cuenco of Lakas–NUCD–UMDP was re-elected to a third term.

Candidate	Party	Votes	%
Antonio Cuenco (incumbent)	Lakas–NUCD–UMDP	81,037	
Total			
Source: Commission on Elections

== Cotabato ==
=== Cotabato's 1st district ===
Incumbent Anthony Dequiña of the Nationalist People's Coalition was re-elected to a second term.

Candidate	Party	Votes	%
Anthony Dequiña (incumbent)	Nationalist People's Coalition	69,253	58.56
Cesar Tapia	Lakas–NUCD–UMDP	18,726	15.84
Midpantao Adil	Laban ng Demokratikong Pilipino	18,310	15.48
Nestor Quintana	Independent	6,373	5.39
Rodrigo Gutang	Independent	5,590	4.73
Total		118,252	100.00
Source: Commission on Elections

=== Cotabato's 2nd district ===
Incumbent Gregorio Andolana of Lakas–NUCD–UMDP was re-elected to a third term.

Candidate	Party	Votes	%
Gregorio Andolana (incumbent)	Lakas–NUCD–UMDP	95,239	96.79
Vicente Witara	Lapiang Manggagawa	3,162	3.21
Total		98,401	100.00
Source: Commission on Elections

== Davao City ==
=== Davao City's 1st district ===
Prospero Nograles, an independent, won the election.

Candidate	Party	Votes	%
Prospero Nograles	Independent	63,400	
Total			
Source: Commission on Elections

=== Davao City's 2nd district ===
Incumbent Manuel Garcia of Lakas–NUCD–UMDP was re-elected to a second term.

Candidate	Party	Votes	%
Manuel Garcia (incumbent)	Lakas–NUCD–UMDP	39,025	
Total			
Source: Commission on Elections

=== Davao City's 3rd district ===
Incumbent Elias Lopez of the Nationalist People's Coalition was re-elected to a second term.

Candidate	Party	Votes	%
Elias Lopez (incumbent)	Nationalist People's Coalition	29,904	
Total			
Source: Commission on Elections

== Davao del Norte ==
=== Davao del Norte's 1st district ===
Incumbent Rogelio Sarmiento of Lakas–NUCD–UMDP was re-elected to a second term.

Candidate	Party	Votes	%
Rogelio Sarmiento (incumbent)	Lakas–NUCD–UMDP	75,932	98.61
Nithler Varona	Nationalist People's Coalition	1,073	1.39
Total		77,005	100.00
Source: Commission on Elections

=== Davao del Norte's 2nd district ===
Incumbent Baltazar Sator of Lakas–NUCD–UMDP was re-elected to a third term.

Candidate	Party	Votes	%
Baltazar Sator (incumbent)	Lakas–NUCD–UMDP	66,548	52.62
Jose Caballero	Partido ng Masang Pilipino	37,830	29.91
Fortunato Dayot	Nationalist People's Coalition	22,101	17.47
Total		126,479	100.00
Source: Commission on Elections

=== Davao del Norte's 3rd district ===
Incumbent Rodolfo del Rosario of Laban ng Demokratikong Pilipino was re-elected to a third term.

Candidate	Party	Votes	%
Rodolfo del Rosario (incumbent)	Lakas–NUCD–UMDP	76,772	93.90
Eli Barrido	Nationalist People's Coalition	4,987	6.10
Total		81,759	100.00
Source: Commission on Elections

== Davao del Sur ==
=== Davao del Sur's 1st district ===
Incumbent Alejandro Almendras of Lakas–NUCD–UMDP retired. Lakas–NUCD–UMDP nominated Alejandro Almendras Jr., who won the election.

Candidate	Party	Votes	%
Alejandro Almendras Jr.	Lakas–NUCD–UMDP	47,645	44.99
Josefina Almazan	None	33,816	31.93
Pablo Villaber	None	21,776	20.56
Wilfredo Granada	None	2,655	2.51
Total		105,892	100.00
Source: Commission on Elections

=== Davao del Sur's 2nd district ===
Incumbent Benjamin Bautista Sr. of Lakas–NUCD–UMDP was re-elected to a third term.

Candidate	Party	Votes	%
Benjamin Bautista Sr. (incumbent)	Lakas–NUCD–UMDP	55,681	78.08
Leopoldo Diones Jr.	None	15,629	21.92
Total		71,310	100.00
Source: Commission on Elections

== Davao Oriental ==
=== Davao Oriental's 1st district ===
Incumbent Maria Elena Palma Gil of Lakas–NUCD–UMDP was re-elected to a second term.

Candidate	Party	Votes	%
Maria Elena Palma Gil (incumbent)	Lakas–NUCD–UMDP	33,943	91.54
Navarro Batingana	Nationalist People's Coalition	3,135	8.46
Total		37,078	100.00
Source: Commission on Elections

=== Davao Oriental's 2nd district ===
Incumbent Thelma Almario of Lakas–NUCD–UMDP was re-elected to a third term.

Candidate	Party	Votes	%
Thelma Almario (incumbent)	Lakas–NUCD–UMDP	49,802	78.67
Alan Andrada	Independent	8,352	13.19
Arnulfo Agleron Sr.	Nationalist People's Coalition	5,150	8.14
Total		63,304	100.00
Source: Commission on Elections

== Eastern Samar ==
Incumbent Jose Ramirez of Lakas–NUCD–UMDP was re-elected to a third term.

Candidate	Party	Votes	%
Jose Ramirez (incumbent)	Lakas–NUCD–UMDP	41,523	37.35
Marcelino Libanan	Lakas–NUCD–UMDP	40,869	36.76
Ben Evardone	Laban ng Demokratikong Pilipino	28,788	25.89
Total		111,180	100.00
Source: Commission on Elections

== Guimaras ==
Guimaras' lone district was created on October 10, 1991, from Iloilo's 2nd district. Catalino Nava of Lakas–NUCD–UMDP won the election.

Candidate	Party	Votes	%
Catalino Nava	Lakas–NUCD–UMDP	22,760	56.67
Roman Mosqueda	People's Reform Party	17,403	43.33
Total		40,163	100.00
Source: Commission on Elections

== Ifugao ==
Incumbent Benjamin Cappleman of the Nationalist People's Coalition was re-elected to a second term.

Candidate	Party	Votes	%
Benjamin Cappleman (incumbent)	Nationalist People's Coalition	34,900	66.45
Gualberto Lumawig	Lakas–NUCD–UMDP	17,619	33.55
Total		52,519	100.00
Source: Commission on Elections

== Ilocos Norte ==
=== Ilocos Norte's 1st district ===
Incumbent Roque Ablan Jr. of Lakas–NUCD–UMDP was re-elected to a third term.

Candidate	Party	Votes	%
Roque Ablan Jr. (incumbent)	Lakas–NUCD–UMDP	45,298	45.08
Rolando Abadilla	Independent	37,909	37.73
Lita Marcos	Independent	17,275	17.19
Total		100,482	100.00
Source: Commission on Elections

=== Ilocos Norte's 2nd district ===
Incumbent Bongbong Marcos of Kilusang Bagong Lipunan retired to run for the Senate. Simeon Valdez of Lakas–NUCD–UMDP won the election unopposed.

Candidate	Party	Votes	%
Simeon Valdez	Lakas–NUCD–UMDP	64,905	100.00
Total		64,905	100.00
Source: Commission on Elections

== Ilocos Sur ==
=== Ilocos Sur's 1st district ===
Incumbent Mariano Tajon of Lakas–NUCD–UMDP was re-elected to a second term.

Candidate	Party	Votes	%
Mariano Tajon (incumbent)	Lakas–NUCD–UMDP	32,931	38.32
Salacnib Baterina	Independent	29,045	33.80
Ma. Livia de Leon	Independent	23,954	27.88
Total		85,930	100.00
Source: Commission on Elections

=== Ilocos Sur's 2nd district ===
Incumbent Eric Singson of Lakas–NUCD–UMDP was re-elected to a third term.

Candidate	Party	Votes	%
Eric Singson (incumbent)	Lakas–NUCD–UMDP	97,063	89.14
Candido Balbin Jr.	Lapiang Manggagawa	11,828	10.86
Total		108,891	100.00
Source: Commission on Elections

== Iloilo ==
=== Iloilo's 1st district ===
Incumbent Oscar Garin of Lakas–NUCD–UMDP was re-elected to a third term.

Candidate	Party	Votes	%
Oscar Garin (incumbent)	Lakas–NUCD–UMDP	61,303	56.14
Gerardo Flores	Laban ng Demokratikong Pilipino	47,895	43.86
Total		109,198	100.00
Source: Commission on Elections

=== Iloilo's 2nd district ===
Incumbent Alberto Lopez of Lakas–NUCD–UMDP was re-elected to a third term.

Candidate	Party	Votes	%
Alberto Lopez (incumbent)	Lakas–NUCD–UMDP	66,671	84.01
Simplicio Griño	People's Reform Party	12,692	15.99
Total		79,363	100.00
Source: Commission on Elections

=== Iloilo's 3rd district ===
Incumbent Licurgo Tirador of Lakas–NUCD–UMDP won re-election to a third term.

Candidate	Party	Votes	%
Licurgo Tirador (incumbent)	Lakas–NUCD–UMDP	66,165	61.73
Rene Villa	Laban ng Demokratikong Pilipino	41,025	38.27
Total		107,190	100.00
Source: Commission on Elections

=== Iloilo's 4th district ===
Incumbent Nicetas Panes of Lakas–NUCD–UMDP ran for a second term, but was defeated by Narciso Monfort of Laban ng Demokratikong Pilipino.

Candidate	Party	Votes	%
Narciso Monfort	Laban ng Demokratikong Pilipino	64,904	63.81
Nicetas Panes (incumbent)	Lakas–NUCD–UMDP	36,811	36.19
Total		101,715	100.00
Source: Commission on Elections

=== Iloilo's 5th district ===
Incumbent Niel Tupas Sr. of Lakas–NUCD–UMDP was re-elected to a third term.

Candidate	Party	Votes	%
Niel Tupas Sr. (incumbent)	Lakas–NUCD–UMDP	76,445	83.61
Mario Salcedo Jr.	Laban ng Demokratikong Pilipino	14,983	16.39
Total		91,428	100.00
Source: Commission on Elections

== Iloilo City ==
Incumbent Rafael Lopez-Vito of Lakas–NUCD–UMDP ran for a third term, but was defeated by Raul M. Gonzalez of the Nacionalista Party.

Candidate	Party	Votes	%
Raul M. Gonzalez	Nacionalista Party	59,663	46.24
Rafael Lopez Vito (incumbent)	Lakas–NUCD–UMDP	48,018	37.22
Rolando Dabao	Laban ng Demokratikong Pilipino	21,339	16.54
Total		129,020	100.00
Source: Commission on Elections

== Isabela ==
=== Isabela's 1st district ===
Incumbent Rodolfo Albano Jr. of Lakas–NUCD–UMDP was re-elected to a third term.

Candidate	Party	Votes	%
Rodolfo Albano Jr. (incumbent)	Lakas–NUCD–UMDP	54,692	74.76
Manuel Binag	Nationalist People's Coalition	13,339	18.23
Alfonso Singson	Liberal Party	5,125	7.01
Total		73,156	100.00
Source: Commission on Elections

=== Isabela's 2nd district ===
Incumbent Faustino Dy Jr. of Lakas–NUCD–UMDP was re-elected to a second term.

Candidate	Party	Votes	%
Faustino Dy Jr. (incumbent)	Lakas–NUCD–UMDP	66,000	92.28
Luciano Lactao	Liberal Party	5,522	7.72
Total		71,522	100.00
Source: Commission on Elections

=== Isabela's 3rd district ===
Incumbent Santiago Respicio of Lakas–NUCD–UMDP was re-elected to a third term.

Candidate	Party	Votes	%
Santiago Respicio (incumbent)	Lakas–NUCD–UMDP	46,672	69.52
Rogelio Siquitan Jr.	Independent	20,139	30.00
Ismael Santos	Independent	322	0.48
Total		67,133	100.00
Source: Commission on Elections

=== Isabela's 4th district ===
Incumbent Antonio Abaya of the Nationalist People's Coalition was re-elected to a third term.

Candidate	Party	Votes	%
Antonio Abaya (incumbent)	Nationalist People's Coalition	74,977	82.61
Abraham Sable	Independent	15,786	17.39
Total		90,763	100.00
Source: Commission on Elections

== Kalinga-Apayao ==
Incumbent Elias Bulut of Lakas–NUCD–UMDP was re-elected to a second term.

Candidate	Party	Votes	%
Elias Bulut (incumbent)	Lakas–NUCD–UMDP	62,386	76.06
Amelia Miranda	Nationalist People's Coalition	11,013	13.43
Juanito Eyadan	Laban ng Demokratikong Pilipino	8,618	10.51
Total		82,017	100.00
Source: Commission on Elections

== La Union ==
=== La Union's 1st district ===
Incumbent Victor Ortega of the Lakas–NUCD–UMDP was re-elected to a third term.

Candidate	Party	Votes	%
Victor Ortega (incumbent)	Lakas–NUCD–UMDP	60,132	57.69
Artemio Tadiar Jr.	Nationalist People's Coalition	43,944	42.16
Jesus Balingit	Independent	158	0.15
Total		104,234	100.00
Source: Commission on Elections

=== La Union's 2nd district ===
Incumbent Jose Aspiras of Lakas–NUCD–UMDP was re-elected to a third term.

Candidate	Party	Votes	%
Jose Aspiras (incumbent)	Lakas–NUCD–UMDP	67,017	61.91
Dioscoro Yoro	Nationalist People's Coalition	41,227	38.09
Total		108,244	100.00
Source: Commission on Elections

== Laguna ==
=== Laguna's 1st district ===
Incumbent Roy Almoro of Lakas–NUCD–UMDP ran for a second term, but was defeated by Nereo Joaquin of Laban ng Demokratikong Pilipino.

Candidate	Party	Votes	%
Nereo Joaquin	Laban ng Demokratikong Pilipino	71,692	53.39
Roy Almoro (incumbent)	Lakas–NUCD–UMDP	62,576	46.61
Total		134,268	100.00
Source: Commission on Elections

=== Laguna's 2nd district ===
Incumbent Rodolfo Tingzon of Lakas–NUCD–UMDP retired to run for Governor of Laguna. Lakas–NUCD–UMDP nominated Emelita Carayblas, who was defeated by Jun Chipeco of Laban ng Demokratikong Pilipino.

Candidate	Party	Votes	%
Jun Chipeco	Laban ng Demokratikong Pilipino	67,466	59.62
Emelita Carayblas	Lakas–NUCD–UMDP	45,296	40.03
Fidel Bardos	Independent	391	0.35
Total		113,153	100.00
Source: Commission on Elections

=== Laguna's 3rd district ===
Incumbent Florante Aquino of Lakas–NUCD–UMDP was re-elected to a third term.

Candidate	Party	Votes	%
Florante Aquino (incumbent)	Lakas–NUCD–UMDP	74,835	55.86
Dolores Potenciano	Laban ng Demokratikong Pilipino	43,821	32.71
Nelson Agapay Sr.	Nationalist People's Coalition	15,316	11.43
Total		133,972	100.00
Source: Commission on Elections

=== Laguna's 4th district ===
Incumbent Magdaleno Palacol Sr. of Lakas–NUCD–UMDP was re-elected to a third term.

Candidate	Party	Votes	%
Magdaleno Palacol Sr. (incumbent)	Lakas–NUCD–UMDP	62,700	46.91
Benjamin Agarao Jr.	Lakas–NUCD–UMDP	31,838	23.82
Wendell Lagumbay	Nationalist People's Coalition	18,613	13.93
Leonides de Leon	Nacionalista Party	13,014	9.74
Florentino Cruz	People's Reform Party	4,313	3.23
Bernardo Relova	Independent	3,168	2.37
Total		133,646	100.00
Source: Commission on Elections

== Lanao del Norte ==
=== Lanao del Norte's 1st district ===
Incumbent Mariano Badelles of Lakas–NUCD–UMDP was re-elected to a third term.

Candidate	Party	Votes	%
Mariano Badelles (incumbent)	Lakas–NUCD–UMDP	72,446	65.56
Uriel Anthony Borja	Laban ng Demokratikong Pilipino	27,689	25.06
Franco Badelles	Nationalist People's Coalition	10,362	9.38
Total		110,497	100.00
Source: Commission on Elections

=== Lanao del Norte's 2nd district ===
Incumbent Mario Hisuler of Laban ng Demokratikong Pilipino took office on October 5, 1994, after winning an electoral protest against Macabangkit Lanto of Lakas–NUCD–UMDP. Hisuler ran for a full term, but was defeated by Abdullah Mangotara, an independent.

Candidate	Party	Votes	%
Abdullah Mangotara	Independent	42,658	47.69
Mario Hisuler (incumbent)	Laban ng Demokratikong Pilipino	25,061	28.02
Macabangkit Lanto	Lakas–NUCD–UMDP	21,730	24.29
Total		89,449	100.00
Source: Commission on Elections

== Lanao del Sur ==
=== Lanao del Sur's 1st district ===
Incumbent Mamintal Adiong Sr. of Lakas–NUCD–UMDP was re-elected to a second term.

Candidate	Party	Votes	%
Mamintal Adiong Sr. (incumbent)	Lakas–NUCD–UMDP		
Abdulgaffur Madki Alonto	Independent	34,743	
Jiamil Dianalan	Nationalist People's Coalition	16,879	
Arkia Batua	Nacionalista Party	2,891	
Total			
Source: Commission on Elections

=== Lanao del Sur's 2nd district ===
Incumbent Mohammad Ali Dimaporo of Lakas–NUCD–UMDP retired to run for Governor of Lanao del Sur. Lakas–NUCD–UMDP nominated Pangalian Balindong, who won the election.

Candidate	Party	Votes	%
Pangalian Balindong	Lakas–NUCD–UMDP		
Taib Pala Dipatuan	Laban ng Demokratikong Pilipino	23,258	
Unotan Lucman	Nationalist People's Coalition	10,280	
Sultan Magdara Palawan	Liberal	650	
Total			
Source: Commission on Elections

== Las Piñas–Muntinlupa ==
Incumbent Manny Villar of Lakas–NUCD–UMDP was re-elected to a second term.

Candidate	Party	Votes	%
Manny Villar (incumbent)	Lakas–NUCD–UMDP	142,494	84.10
Edgardo Blanco	Independent	24,024	14.18
Eduardo Garcia	Independent	2,922	1.72
Total		169,440	100.00
Source: Commission on Elections

== Leyte ==
=== Leyte's 1st district ===
Incumbent Cirilo Roy Montejo of Lakas–NUCD–UMDP ran for a third term, but was defeated by Imelda Marcos of Kilusang Bagong Lipunan.

Candidate	Party	Votes	%
Imelda Marcos	Kilusang Bagong Lipunan	70,471	65.67
Cirilo Montejo (incumbent)	Lakas–NUCD–UMDP	36,833	34.33
Total		107,304	100.00
Source: Commission on Elections

=== Leyte's 2nd district ===
Incumbent Sergio Apostol of Lakas–NUCD–UMDP was re-elected to a second term.

Candidate	Party	Votes	%
Sergio Apostol (incumbent)	Lakas–NUCD–UMDP	41,024	44.43
Edgardo Enerlan	Partido ng Masang Pilipino	28,432	30.79
Simeon Kempis Jr.	Independent	22,882	24.78
Total		92,338	100.00
Source: Commission on Elections

=== Leyte's 3rd district ===
Incumbent Alberto Veloso of Lakas–NUCD–UMDP was re-elected to a third term.

Candidate	Party	Votes	%
Alberto Veloso (incumbent)	Lakas–NUCD–UMDP	20,696	98.60
Ranulfo Payos	Nationalist People's Coalition	294	1.40
Total		20,990	100.00
Source: Commission on Elections

=== Leyte's 4th district ===
Incumbent Carmelo Locsin of Lakas–NUCD–UMDP was re-elected to a third term.

Candidate	Party	Votes	%
Carmelo Locsin (incumbent)	Lakas–NUCD–UMDP	62,068	59.05
Esteban Conejos Jr.	Kilusang Bagong Lipunan	43,049	40.95
Total		105,117	100.00
Source: Commission on Elections

=== Leyte's 5th district ===
Incumbent Eriberto Loreto of Lakas–NUCD–UMDP was re-elected to a third term.

Candidate	Party	Votes	%
Eriberto Loreto (incumbent)	Lakas–NUCD–UMDP	52,620	60.24
Arturo Carlos Astorga II	Nationalist People's Coalition	34,563	39.57
Ambrosio Fernandez	Independent	165	0.19
Total		87,348	100.00
Source: Commission on Elections

== Maguindanao ==
=== Maguindanao's 1st district ===
Incumbent Michael Mastura of Lakas–NUCD–UMDP ran for a third term, but was defeated by Didagen Dilangalen of the Nationalist People's Coalition.

Candidate	Party	Votes	%
Didagen Dilangalen	Nationalist People's Coalition	71,302	50.92
Michael Mastura (incumbent)	Lakas–NUCD–UMDP	68,714	49.08
Total		140,016	100.00
Source: Commission on Elections

=== Maguindanao's 2nd district ===
Incumbent Simeon Datumanong of Lakas–NUCD–UMDP was re-elected to a second term.

Candidate	Party	Votes	%
Simeon Datumanong (incumbent)	Lakas–NUCD–UMDP	65,869	61.83
Pike Mentang	Nationalist People's Coalition	40,658	38.17
Total		106,527	100.00
Source: Commission on Elections

== Makati ==
=== Makati's 1st district ===
Makati's 1st district was created on January 2, 1995, from Makati's lone district. Incumbent Makati's lone district representative Joker Arroyo, an independent, was re-elected to a second term.

Candidate	Party	Votes	%
Joker Arroyo	Independent	68,092	72.67
Maria Consuelo Puyat-Reyes	Lakas–NUCD–UMDP	19,649	20.97
Enrico Sampang	People's Reform Party	5,961	6.36
Total		93,702	100.00
Source: Commission on Elections

=== Makati's 2nd district ===
Makati's 2nd district was created on January 2, 1995, from Makati's lone district. Butz Aquino of Laban ng Demokratikong Pilipino received the most number of votes, but was disqualified by the Commission on Elections on June 2, 1995, for lack of residency.

Candidate	Party	Votes	%
Butz Aquino	Laban ng Demokratikong Pilipino	38,547	41.34
Augusto Syjuco Jr.	Lakas–NUCD–UMDP	35,910	38.52
Nemesio Yabut Jr.	Nationalist People's Coalition	10,059	10.79
Billy Bibit	Independent	8,626	9.25
Ramon Delloro	Independent	91	0.10
Total		93,233	100.00
Source: Commission on Elections, The Lawphil Project

== Malabon–Navotas ==
Incumbent Tessie Aquino-Oreta of Laban ng Demokratikong Pilipino was re-elected to a third term.

Candidate	Party	Votes	%
Tessie Aquino-Oreta (incumbent)	Laban ng Demokratikong Pilipino	80,940	57.42
Jesus Tachanco	Lakas–NUCD–UMDP	60,017	42.58
Total		140,957	100.00
Source: Commission on Elections

== Mandaluyong ==
Mandaluyong's lone district was created on February 9, 1994, from San Juan–Mandaluyong's lone district. Neptali Gonzales II of Lakas–NUCD–UMDP won the election.

Candidate	Party	Votes	%
Neptali Gonzales II	Lakas–NUCD–UMDP	41,112	44.50
Roberto Antonio	Nationalist People's Coalition	25,216	27.29
Antonio Bernardo	People's Reform Party	24,506	26.53
Criselda Marcia Calupitan	Nacionalista Party	1,351	1.46
Simeon Carbonell Jr.	Kilusang Bagong Lipunan	199	0.22
Total		92,384	100.00
Source: Commission on Elections

== Manila ==
=== Manila's 1st district ===
Incumbent Martin Isidro of Laban ng Demokratikong Pilipino was re-elected to a third term.

Candidate	Party	Votes	%
Martin Isidro (incumbent)	Laban ng Demokratikong Pilipino	79,202	75.18
Honorio Lopez II	Lakas–NUCD–UMDP	24,885	23.62
Johnny Regalado	Kilusang Bagong Lipunan	1,256	1.19
Total		105,343	100.00
Source: Commission on Elections

=== Manila's 2nd district ===
Incumbent Jaime Lopez of Lakas–NUCD–UMDP was re-elected to a third term.

Candidate	Party	Votes	%
Jaime Lopez (incumbent)	Lakas–NUCD–UMDP	39,818	48.11
Natalio Beltran Jr.	Nationalist People's Coalition	26,501	32.02
Reynaldo Jaylo	People's Reform Party	15,776	19.06
Antonio Martelino	Independent	666	0.80
Total		82,761	100.00
Source: Commission on Elections

=== Manila's 3rd district ===
Incumbent Leonardo Fugoso of the Liberal Party was re-elected to a third term.

Candidate	Party	Votes	%
Leonardo Fugoso (incumbent)	Liberal Party	36,297	49.54
Harry Angping	Lakas–NUCD–UMDP	25,029	34.16
Meliza Galang	Nationalist People's Coalition	9,561	13.05
Henry Palao	Lakas–NUCD–UMDP	1,235	1.69
Rosalinda Sia	Independent	943	1.29
Brigido Mesina Jr.	Independent	209	0.29
Total		73,274	100.00
Source: Commission on Elections

=== Manila's 4th district ===
Incumbent Ramon Bagatsing Jr. of Laban ng Demokratikong Pilipino was re-elected to a third term.

Candidate	Party	Votes	%
Ramon Bagatsing Jr. (incumbent)	Laban ng Demokratikong Pilipino	52,439	58.13
Ernesto Diokno	Lakas–NUCD–UMDP	24,888	27.59
Emilio Bonoan	Lapiang Manggagawa	12,889	14.29
Total		90,216	100.00
Source: Commission on Elections

=== Manila's 5th district ===
Incumbent Amado Bagatsing of Laban ng Demokratikong Pilipino was re-elected to a third term.

Candidate	Party	Votes	%
Amado Bagatsing (incumbent)	Laban ng Demokratikong Pilipino	80,653	84.37
Robert Evangelista	Lakas–NUCD–UMDP	14,937	15.63
Total		95,590	100.00
Source: Commission on Elections

=== Manila's 6th district ===
Incumbent Rosenda Ann Ocampo of the Nationalist People's Coalition was re-elected to a second term.

Candidate	Party	Votes	%
Rosenda Ann Ocampo (incumbent)	Nationalist People's Coalition	47,490	49.85
Casimiro Sison	Lakas–NUCD–UMDP	22,089	23.19
Maria Corazon Caballes	Laban ng Demokratikong Pilipino	13,957	14.65
Benedicto Dorado	Nacionalista Party	11,505	12.08
Castor Macariola	Independent	223	0.23
Total		95,264	100.00
Source: Commission on Elections

== Marikina ==
Incumbent Romeo Candazo of Liberal Party was re-elected to a second term.

Candidate	Party	Votes	%
Romeo Candazo (incumbent)	Liberal Party	47,594	43.42
Wilfredo Banzon	Lakas–NUCD–UMDP	43,927	40.08
Cesar Ching	People's Reform Party	11,595	10.58
Antonio Tinio	Independent	6,206	5.66
Domingo Garcia	Independent	282	0.26
Total		109,604	100.00
Source: Commission on Elections

== Marinduque ==
Incumbent Carmencita Reyes of Lakas–NUCD–UMDP was re-elected to a third term.

Candidate	Party	Votes	%
Carmencita Reyes (incumbent)	Lakas–NUCD–UMDP	47,687	73.05
Francisco Lecaroz	Nationalist People's Coalition	17,596	26.95
Total		65,283	100.00
Source: Commission on Elections

== Masbate ==
=== Masbate's 1st district ===
The seat was vacant after Tito Espinosa of Lakas–NUCD–UMDP was assassinated on February 28, 1995. Lakas–NUCD–UMDP nominated Vida Espinosa, who won the election.

Candidate	Party	Votes	%
Vida Espinosa	Lakas–NUCD–UMDP	22,869	62.35
Manuel Bunan	Independent	12,272	33.46
Angelito Clemente	Laban ng Demokratikong Pilipino	1,539	4.20
Total		36,680	100.00
Source: Commission on Elections

=== Masbate's 2nd district ===
Incumbent Luz Cleta Bakunawa of Lakas–NUCD–UMDP was re-elected to a third term.

Candidate	Party	Votes	%
Luz Cleta Bakunawa (incumbent)	Lakas–NUCD–UMDP	41,820	69.11
Raul Estrella	Liberal Party	18,689	30.89
Total		60,509	100.00
Source: Commission on Elections

=== Masbate's 3rd district ===
Incumbent Antonio Kho of Liberal Party retired to run for Governor of Masbate. The Liberal Party nominated Ruperto Gadia, who was defeated by Fausto Seachon Jr. of the Independent Nacionalistas and Allies.

Candidate	Party	Votes	%
Fausto Seachon Jr.	Independent Nacionalistas and Allies	31,178	46.22
Ruperto Gadia	Liberal Party	25,617	37.98
Romulo Benito San Juan	Lakas–NUCD–UMDP	5,372	7.96
Titus Adorna	Laban ng Demokratikong Pilipino	3,814	5.65
Pablo Bautista	Independent	1,471	2.18
Total		67,452	100.00
Source: Commission on Elections

== Misamis Occidental ==
=== Misamis Occidental's 1st district ===
Incumbent Percival Catane of Lakas–NUCD–UMDP was re-elected to a second term.

Candidate	Party	Votes	%
Percival Catane (incumbent)	Lakas–NUCD–UMDP	59,906	83.29
Julio Ozamiz	Laban ng Demokratikong Pilipino	12,018	16.71
Total		71,924	100.00
Source: Commission on Elections

=== Misamis Occidental's 2nd district ===
Incumbent Hilarion Ramiro Jr. of Lakas–NUCD–UMDP retired. Lakas–NUCD–UMDP nominated Herminia Ramiro, who won the election.

Candidate	Party	Votes	%
Herminia Ramiro	Lakas–NUCD–UMDP	61,586	80.06
Marcelian Tapayan	Independent	15,343	19.94
Total		76,929	100.00
Source: Commission on Elections

== Misamis Oriental ==
=== Misamis Oriental's 1st district ===
Incumbent Homobono Cezar of Lakas–NUCD–UMDP was re-elected to a second term.

Candidate	Party	Votes	%
Homobono Cezar (incumbent)	Lakas–NUCD–UMDP	53,228	59.00
Oscar Moreno	IPP	36,292	40.23
Alexander Tagarda	Independent	443	0.49
Rommel Zagado	Independent	253	0.28
Total		90,216	100.00
Source: Commission on Elections

=== Misamis Oriental's 2nd district ===
Incumbent Victorico Chaves of Lakas–NUCD–UMDP was re-elected to a third term.

Candidate	Party	Votes	%
Victorico Chaves (incumbent)	Lakas–NUCD–UMDP	54,863	52.23
Augusto Baculio	IPP	50,181	47.77
Total		105,044	100.00
Source: Commission on Elections

== Mountain Province ==
Incumbent Victor Dominguez of Lakas–NUCD–UMDP was re-elected to a third term.

Candidate	Party	Votes	%
Victor Dominguez (incumbent)	Lakas–NUCD–UMDP	32,521	66.67
William Claver	PDP–Laban	16,255	33.33
Total		48,776	100.00
Source: Commission on Elections

== Negros Occidental ==
=== Negros Occidental's 1st district ===
Incumbent Tranquilino Carmona of the Nationalist People's Coalition ran for a second term, but was defeated by Jules Ledesma of Lakas–NUCD–UMDP.

Candidate	Party	Votes	%
Jules Ledesma	Lakas–NUCD–UMDP	43,773	49.77
Tranquilino Carmona (incumbent)	Nationalist People's Coalition	41,368	47.04
Tranquilino Gale	Independent	2,325	2.64
Larry Dilag	Liberal Party	485	0.55
Total		87,951	100.00
Source: Commission on Elections

=== Negros Occidental's 2nd district ===
Incumbent Manuel Puey of Liberal Party ran for a third term, but was defeated by Alfredo Marañon of Lakas–NUCD–UMDP.

Candidate	Party	Votes	%
Alfredo Marañon	Lakas–NUCD–UMDP	40,548	52.19
Manuel Puey (incumbent)	Liberal Party	37,138	47.81
Total		77,686	100.00
Source: Commission on Elections

=== Negros Occidental's 3rd district ===
Incumbent Jose Carlos Lacson of Lakas–NUCD–UMDP was re-elected to a third term.

Candidate	Party	Votes	%
Jose Carlos Lacson (incumbent)	Lakas–NUCD–UMDP	89,792	95.41
German Valladarez Sr.	Independent	3,981	4.23
Angel Dudero	Independent	340	0.36
Total		94,113	100.00
Source: Commission on Elections

=== Negros Occidental's 4th district ===
Incumbent Edward Matti of the Nationalist People's Coalition was re-elected to a third term unopposed.

Candidate	Party	Votes	%
Edward Matti (incumbent)	Nationalist People's Coalition	70,132	100.00
Total		70,132	100.00
Source: Commission on Elections

=== Negros Occidental's 5th district ===
Incumbent Mariano Yulo of the Nationalist People's Coalition was re-elected to a third term unopposed.

Candidate	Party	Votes	%
Mariano Yulo (incumbent)	Nationalist People's Coalition	54,315	100.00
Total		54,315	100.00
Source: Commission on Elections

=== Negros Occidental's 6th district ===
Incumbent Hortensia Starke of Lakas–NUCD–UMDP ran for a third term, but was defeated by Genaro Alvarez Jr. of the Nationalist People's Coalition.

Candidate	Party	Votes	%
Genaro Alvarez Jr.	Nationalist People's Coalition	50,257	55.31
Hortensia Starke (incumbent)	Lakas–NUCD–UMDP	40,059	44.09
Charles Pfleider	Independent	548	0.60
Total		90,864	100.00
Source: Commission on Elections

== Negros Oriental ==
=== Negros Oriental's 1st district ===
Incumbent Jerome Paras of Lakas–NUCD–UMDP was re-elected to a third term unopposed.

Candidate	Party	Votes	%
Jerome Paras (incumbent)	Lakas–NUCD–UMDP	59,349	100.00
Total		59,349	100.00
Source: Commission on Elections

=== Negros Oriental's 2nd district ===
Incumbent Miguel Romero of Lakas–NUCD–UMDP was re-elected to a third term unopposed.

Candidate	Party	Votes	%
Miguel Romero (incumbent)	Lakas–NUCD–UMDP	77,315	100.00
Total		77,315	100.00
Source: Commission on Elections

=== Negros Oriental's 3rd district ===
Incumbent Margarito Teves of Laban ng Demokratikong Pilipino was re-elected to a third term.

Candidate	Party	Votes	%
Margarito Teves (incumbent)	Laban ng Demokratikong Pilipino	57,913	99.02
Pedro Viente	Lapiang Manggagawa	573	0.98
Total		58,486	100.00
Source: Commission on Elections

== Northern Samar ==
=== Northern Samar's 1st district ===
Incumbent Raul Daza of the Liberal Party was re-elected to a third term.

Candidate	Party	Votes	%
Raul Daza (incumbent)	Liberal Party	2,565	
Total			
Source: Commission on Elections

=== Northern Samar's 2nd district ===
Incumbent Wilmar Lucero of the Liberal Party was re-elected to a second term.

Candidate	Party	Votes	%
Wilmar Lucero (incumbent)	Liberal Party	33,147	51.25
Romualdo Vicencio	Laban ng Demokratikong Pilipino	31,524	48.75
Total		64,671	100.00
Source: Commission on Elections

== Nueva Ecija ==
=== Nueva Ecija's 1st district ===
Incumbent Renato Diaz of Lakas–NUCD–UMDP was re-elected to a second term.

Candidate	Party	Votes	%
Renato Diaz (incumbent)	Lakas–NUCD–UMDP	67,820	52.76
Josefina Joson	None	60,725	47.24
Total		128,545	100.00
Source: Commission on Elections

=== Nueva Ecija's 2nd district ===
Incumbent Eleuterio Violago of Lakas–NUCD–UMDP was re-elected to a second term.

Candidate	Party	Votes	%
Eleuterio Violago (incumbent)	Lakas–NUCD–UMDP	64,313	60.66
Simeon Garcia Jr.	Nationalist People's Coalition	41,713	39.34
Total		106,026	100.00
Source: Commission on Elections

=== Nueva Ecija's 3rd district ===
Incumbent Pacifico Fajardo of Lakas–NUCD–UMDP was re-elected to a second term.

Candidate	Party	Votes	%
Pacifico Fajardo (incumbent)	Lakas–NUCD–UMDP	45,449	36.34
Philip Ordoñez	Independent	40,643	32.50
Tomas Talavera	Nationalist People's Coalition	36,588	29.26
Rizalino Yazon Jr.	Kilusang Bagong Lipunan	2,378	1.90
Total		125,058	100.00
Source: Commission on Elections

=== Nueva Ecija's 4th district ===
Incumbent Victorio Lorenzo of Lakas–NUCD–UMDP ran for a second term, but was defeated by Julita Villareal of Laban ng Demokratikong Pilipino.

Candidate	Party	Votes	%
Julita Villareal	Laban ng Demokratikong Pilipino	69,940	54.68
Victorio Lorenzo (incumbent)	Lakas–NUCD–UMDP	50,536	39.51
Carolina de Jesus	Partido ng Masang Pilipino	7,436	5.81
Total		127,912	100.00
Source: Commission on Elections

== Nueva Vizcaya ==
Incumbent Leonardo B. Perez of the Nationalist People's Coalition ran for a second term, but was defeated by Carlos Padilla of Laban ng Demokratikong Pilipino.

Candidate	Party	Votes	%
Carlos Padilla	Laban ng Demokratikong Pilipino	59,369	51.74
Leonardo B. Perez (incumbent)	Nationalist People's Coalition	54,868	47.82
Lawrence Santa Ana	Independent	506	0.44
Total		114,743	100.00
Source: Commission on Elections

== Occidental Mindoro ==
Incumbent Jose Villarosa of Lakas–NUCD–UMDP was re-elected to a second term.

Candidate	Party	Votes	%
Jose Villarosa (incumbent)	Lakas–NUCD–UMDP	39,314	42.25
Ricardo Quintos	Lakas–NUCD–UMDP	30,591	32.87
Pedro Mendiola Jr.	Laban ng Demokratikong Pilipino	23,153	24.88
Total		93,058	100.00
Source: Commission on Elections

== Oriental Mindoro ==
=== Oriental Mindoro's 1st district ===
Incumbent Renato Leviste of Lakas–NUCD–UMDP was re-elected to a second term.

Candidate	Party	Votes	%
Renato Leviste (incumbent)	Lakas–NUCD–UMDP	71,693	78.44
Ireneo Apasan	Nationalist People's Coalition	19,704	21.56
Total		91,397	100.00
Source: Commission on Elections

=== Oriental Mindoro's 2nd district ===
Incumbent Jesus Punzalan of Lakas–NUCD–UMDP was re-elected to a third term.

Candidate	Party	Votes	%
Jesus Punzalan (incumbent)	Lakas–NUCD–UMDP	31,613	40.35
Manuel Andaya	Laban ng Demokratikong Pilipino	15,051	19.21
Reynaldo Umali	Lakas–NUCD–UMDP	14,943	19.07
Bayani Anastacio	Liberal Party	10,264	13.10
Emmanuel Buenaventura	People's Reform Party	6,470	8.26
Total		78,341	100.00
Source: Commission on Elections

== Palawan ==
=== Palawan's 1st district ===
Incumbent David Ponce de Leon of Lakas–NUCD–UMDP ran for a third term, but was defeated by Vicente Sandoval of Lakas–NUCD–UMDP.

Candidate	Party	Votes	%
Vicente Sandoval	Lakas–NUCD–UMDP	37,709	53.74
David Ponce de Leon (incumbent)	Lakas–NUCD–UMDP	32,387	46.16
Edmundo Palanca	Independent	70	0.10
Total		70,166	100.00
Source: Commission on Elections

=== Palawan's 2nd district ===
Incumbent Alfredo Amor Abueg Jr. of Lakas–NUCD–UMDP was re-elected to a second term.

Candidate	Party	Votes	%
Alfredo Amor Abueg Jr. (incumbent)	Lakas–NUCD–UMDP	52,967	53.46
Teodoro Peña	Lakas–NUCD–UMDP	46,023	46.46
Alberto Setias	Independent	79	0.08
Total		99,069	100.00
Source: Commission on Elections

== Pampanga ==
=== Pampanga's 1st district ===
Incumbent Carmelo Lazatin Sr. of Lakas–NUCD–UMDP was re-elected to a third term.

Candidate	Party	Votes	%
Carmelo Lazatin Sr. (incumbent)	Lakas–NUCD–UMDP	79,399	70.03
Catalino Domingo	Nacionalista Party	25,950	22.89
Eller Torres	Nationalist People's Coalition	7,839	6.91
Allan Villanueva	Independent	184	0.16
Total		113,372	100.00
Source: Commission on Elections

=== Pampanga's 2nd district ===
Incumbent Emigdio Lingad of Lakas–NUCD–UMDP ran for a third term, but was defeated by Zenaida Cruz-Ducut of the Nationalist People's Coalition.

Candidate	Party	Votes	%
Zenaida Cruz-Ducut	Nationalist People's Coalition	67,754	53.07
Emigdio Lingad (incumbent)	Lakas–NUCD–UMDP	59,656	46.73
Marcelino Manalansan	Kilusang Bagong Lipunan	264	0.21
Total		127,674	100.00
Source: Commission on Elections

=== Pampanga's 3rd district ===
Incumbent Andrea D. Domingo of Lakas–NUCD–UMDP ran for a second term, but was defeated by Oscar Samson Rodriguez of Laban ng Demokratikong Pilipino.

Candidate	Party	Votes	%
Oscar Samson Rodriguez	Laban ng Demokratikong Pilipino	77,397	57.99
Andrea D. Domingo (incumbent)	Lakas–NUCD–UMDP	56,058	42.01
Total		133,455	100.00
Source: Commission on Elections

=== Pampanga's 4th district ===
Incumbent Emigdio Bondoc of Lakas–NUCD–UMDP was re-elected to a third term.

Candidate	Party	Votes	%
Emigdio Bondoc (incumbent)	Lakas–NUCD–UMDP	68,789	57.87
Ma. Cristina Tetangco	Independent	49,686	41.80
Alfonso Sagcal	Independent	395	0.33
Total		118,870	100.00
Source: Commission on Elections

== Pangasinan ==
=== Pangasinan's 1st district ===
Incumbent Oscar Orbos of Lakas–NUCD–UMDP retired to run for Governor of Pangasinan. Lakas–NUCD–UMDP nominated Anthony Rene Sison, who was defeated by Hernani Braganza, an independent.

Candidate	Party	Votes	%
Hernani Braganza	Independent	35,150	34.97
Anthony Rene Sison	Lakas–NUCD–UMDP	33,492	33.32
Vicente Millora	Kilusang Bagong Lipunan	24,274	24.15
Oscar Villareal	Independent	7,593	7.55
Total		100,509	100.00
Source: Commission on Elections

=== Pangasinan's 2nd district ===
Incumbent Chris Mendoza of Lakas–NUCD–UMDP ran for a second term, but was defeated by Antonio Bengson III of Laban ng Demokratikong Pilipino.

Candidate	Party	Votes	%
Antonio Bengson III	Laban ng Demokratikong Pilipino	56,966	48.12
Chris Mendoza (incumbent)	Lakas–NUCD–UMDP	52,884	44.67
Bonifacio Doria	Independent	8,241	6.96
Mariano Padlan	Independent	284	0.24
Total		118,375	100.00
Source: Commission on Elections

=== Pangasinan's 3rd district ===
Incumbent Eric Galo Acuña of Lakas–NUCD–UMDP was re-elected to a second term.

Candidate	Party	Votes	%
Eric Galo Acuña (incumbent)	Lakas–NUCD–UMDP	89,161	56.89
Generoso Tulagan	Nationalist People's Coalition	67,376	42.99
Sergia Abrigo	Independent	185	0.12
Total		156,722	100.00
Source: Commission on Elections

=== Pangasinan's 4th district ===
Incumbent Jose de Venecia Jr. of Lakas–NUCD–UMDP was re-elected to a third term unopposed.

Candidate	Party	Votes	%
Jose de Venecia Jr. (incumbent)	Lakas–NUCD–UMDP	105,153	100.00
Total		105,153	100.00
Source: Commission on Elections

=== Pangasinan's 5th district ===
Incumbent Amadeo Perez Jr. of Lakas–NUCD–UMDP was re-elected to a second term.

Candidate	Party
Amadeo Perez Jr. (incumbent)	Lakas–NUCD–UMDP
Total
Source: Commission on Elections

=== Pangasinan's 6th district ===
Incumbent Conrado Estrella III of the Nationalist People's Coalition retired. The NPC nominated Rafael Colet, who was defeated by Ranjit Shahani of Lakas–NUCD–UMDP.

Candidate	Party	Votes	%
Ranjit Shahani	Lakas–NUCD–UMDP	75,052	60.69
Rafael Colet	Nationalist People's Coalition	48,606	39.31
Total		123,658	100.00
Source: Commission on Elections

== Parañaque ==
Incumbent Roilo Golez of Lakas–NUCD–UMDP was re-elected to a second term.

Candidate	Party	Votes	%
Roilo Golez (incumbent)	Lakas–NUCD–UMDP	100,727	67.10
Eddie Gutierrez	Liberal Party	38,973	25.96
Evelyn Arranza	People's Reform Party	6,961	4.64
Sonia de Jesus	Independent	2,593	1.73
Evelyn Langit	Laban ng Demokratikong Pilipino	862	0.57
Total		150,116	100.00
Source: Commission on Elections

== Pasay ==
Incumbent Jovito Claudio of Lakas–NUCD–UMDP was re-elected to a second term.

Candidate	Party	Votes	%
Jovito Claudio (incumbent)	Lakas–NUCD–UMDP	67,405	55.58
Elaine Cuneta	Laban ng Demokratikong Pilipino	53,863	44.42
Total		121,268	100.00
Source: Commission on Elections

== Pasig ==
Incumbent Rufino Javier of the Nationalist People's Coalition was re-elected to a third term.

Candidate	Party	Votes	%
Rufino Javier (incumbent)	Nationalist People's Coalition	59,872	44.81
Francisco Rivera Jr.	Laban ng Demokratikong Pilipino	44,339	33.19
Noel Medina	Liberal Party	29,110	21.79
Ernesto Samano	Kilusang Bagong Lipunan	287	0.21
Total		133,608	100.00
Source: Commission on Elections

== Quezon ==
=== Quezon's 1st district ===
Incumbent Wilfrido Enverga of Lakas–NUCD–UMDP was re-elected to a third term.

Candidate	Party	Votes	%
Wilfrido Enverga (incumbent)	Lakas–NUCD–UMDP	60,681	62.17
Manuel Barcelona Jr.	Nationalist People's Coalition	21,300	21.82
Hjalmar Quintana	Nacionalista Party	15,631	16.01
Total		97,612	100.00
Source: Commission on Elections

=== Quezon's 2nd district ===
Incumbent Marcial Punzalan Jr. of Lakas–NUCD–UMDP was re-elected to a second term.

Candidate	Party	Votes	%
Marcial Punzalan Jr. (incumbent)	Lakas–NUCD–UMDP	78,118	58.25
Rodolfo Robles	Lakas–NUCD–UMDP	55,991	41.75
Total		134,109	100.00
Source: Commission on Elections

=== Quezon's 3rd district ===
Incumbent Danilo Suarez of Lakas–NUCD–UMDP was re-elected to a second term.

Candidate	Party	Votes	%
Danilo Suarez (incumbent)	Lakas–NUCD–UMDP	66,673	84.22
Monchito Rosales	Independent	12,494	15.78
Total		79,167	100.00
Source: Commission on Elections

=== Quezon's 4th district ===
Incumbent Manolet Lavides of Lakas–NUCD–UMDP ran for a second term, but was defeated by Wigberto Tañada of the Liberal Party.

Candidate	Party	Votes	%
Wigberto Tañada	Liberal Party	64,060	57.10
Manolet Lavides (incumbent)	Lakas–NUCD–UMDP	44,712	39.85
Dante Mercado	Nationalist People's Coalition	3,421	3.05
Total		112,193	100.00
Source: Commission on Elections

== Quezon City ==
=== Quezon City's 1st district ===
Incumbent Renato Yap of Lakas–NUCD–UMDP ran for a third term, but was defeated by Reynaldo Calalay of Partido ng Masang Pilipino.

Candidate	Party	Votes	%
Reynaldo Calalay	Partido ng Masang Pilipino	51,761	40.73
Renato Yap (incumbent)	Lakas–NUCD–UMDP	48,201	37.93
Vincent Crisologo	Nationalist People's Coalition	27,130	21.35
Total		127,092	100.00
Source: Commission on Elections

=== Quezon City's 2nd district ===
Incumbent Dante Liban of Lakas–NUCD–UMDP was re-elected to a second term.

Candidate	Party	Votes	%
Dante Liban (incumbent)	Lakas–NUCD–UMDP	123,415	56.74
Ismael Mathay III	Independent	61,843	28.43
Jaime Torres	People's Reform Party	29,499	13.56
Maximo Torres	Lakas–NUCD–UMDP	1,041	0.48
Jose Leny Quimpo	PDP–Laban	696	0.32
Walter Jimenez	Nacionalista Party	627	0.29
Wilfredo Torres	Independent	402	0.18
Total		217,523	100.00
Source: Commission on Elections

=== Quezon City's 3rd district ===
Incumbent Dennis Roldan of Lakas–NUCD–UMDP ran for a second term, but was defeated by Mike Defensor of the Laban ng Demokratikong Pilipino (LDP).

Candidate	Party	Votes	%
Mike Defensor	Laban ng Demokratikong Pilipino	29,663	30.29
Dennis Roldan (incumbent)	Lakas–NUCD–UMDP	20,241	20.67
Ramon Orosa	PDP–Laban	15,403	15.73
Juan Domino	Nationalist People's Coalition	14,891	15.21
Manuel Urbano Jr.	People's Reform Party	12,434	12.70
Edward Buenaflor	Independent	4,990	5.10
Nazario Segundo Jr.	Independent	304	0.31
Total		97,926	100.00
Source: Commission on Elections

=== Quezon City's 4th district ===
Incumbent Feliciano Belmonte Jr. of Lakas–NUCD–UMDP was re-elected to a second term.

Candidate	Party	Votes	%
Feliciano Belmonte Jr. (incumbent)	Lakas–NUCD–UMDP	103,195	98.79
Conrado Tinsay	Independent	1,259	1.21
Total		104,454	100.00
Source: Commission on Elections

== Quirino ==
Incumbent Junie Cua of Lakas–NUCD–UMDP was re-elected to a third term.

Candidate	Party	Votes	%
Junie Cua (incumbent)	Lakas–NUCD–UMDP	38,468	98.23
Maria Angela Cua	Independent	694	1.77
Total		39,162	100.00
Source: Commission on Elections

== Rizal ==
=== Rizal's 1st district ===
Incumbent Gilberto Duavit Sr. of the Nationalist People's Coalition was elected on March 7, 1994, to succeed Manuel Sanchez, who was removed by the Supreme Court on December 7, 1993, after an electoral protest. Duavit was elected to a full term.

Candidate	Party	Votes	%
Gilberto Duavit Sr. (incumbenet)	Nationalist People's Coalition	123,707	64.47
Wilfrido Naval	Lakas–NUCD–UMDP	43,589	22.72
Eduardo Inlayo	Independent	24,592	12.82
Total		191,888	100.00
Source: Commission on Elections

=== Rizal's 2nd district ===
Incumbent Emigdio Tanjuatco Jr. of Lakas–NUCD–UMDP was re-elected to a third term.

Candidate	Party	Votes	%
Emigdio Tanjuatco Jr. (incumbent)	Lakas–NUCD–UMDP	73,334	56.86
Adelaida Magsaysay	Nationalist People's Coalition	54,153	41.99
Julian Maronilla	Lapiang Manggagawa	1,485	1.15
Total		128,972	100.00
Source: Commission on Elections

== Romblon ==
Incumbent Eleandro Jesus Madrona of Lakas–NUCD–UMDP was re-elected to a second term.

Candidate	Party	Votes	%
Eleandro Jesus Madrona (incumbent)	Lakas–NUCD–UMDP	42,251	56.21
Nicanor Hernandez	Nationalist People's Coalition	31,060	41.32
Marcelo Marquez	Partido ng Masang Pilipino	1,768	2.35
Lorenzo Rogon	Independent	88	0.12
Total		75,167	100.00
Source: Commission on Elections

== Samar ==
=== Samar's 1st district ===
Incumbent Rodolfo Tuazon of Lakas–NUCD–UMDP was re-elected to a second term.

Candidate	Party	Votes	%
Rodolfo Tuazon (incumbent)	Lakas–NUCD–UMDP	45,251	55.65
Regina Rabuya	Liberal Party	36,063	44.35
Total		81,314	100.00
Source: Commission on Elections

=== Samar's 2nd district ===
Incumbent Catalino Figueroa of Lakas–NUCD–UMDP was re-elected to a second term.

Candidate	Party	Votes	%
Catalino Figueroa (incumbent)	Lakas–NUCD–UMDP	53,279	50.32
Antonio Bolastig	Nationalist People's Coalition	46,445	43.86
Ramon Mijares	Kilusang Bagong Lipunan	4,104	3.88
Hermogenes Teves	Partido ng Masang Pilipino	2,056	1.94
Total		105,884	100.00
Source: Commission on Elections

== San Juan ==
San Juan's lone district was created on February 9, 1994, from San Juan–Mandaluyong's lone district. Incumbent San Juan–Mandaluyong's lone district representative Ronaldo Zamora of the Nationalist People's Coalition was re-elected to a second term.

Candidate	Party	Votes	%
Ronaldo Zamora	Nationalist People's Coalition	34,857	75.54
Reynaldo San Pascual	Lakas–NUCD–UMDP	10,966	23.76
Ramon Dimen	Lakas–NUCD–UMDP	323	0.70
Total		46,146	100.00
Source: Commission on Elections

== Sarangani ==
Sarangani's lone district was created on March 16, 1992, from South Cotabato's 3rd district. Incumbent South Cotabato's 3rd district representative James Chiongbian of Lakas–NUCD–UMDP was re-elected to a third term.

Candidate	Party	Votes	%
James Chiongbian	Lakas–NUCD–UMDP	48,533	100.00
Total		48,533	100.00
Source: Commission on Elections

== Siquijor ==
Incumbent Orlando Fua of Lakas–NUCD–UMDP was re-elected to a third term.

Candidate	Party	Votes	%
Orlando Fua (incumbent)	Lakas–NUCD–UMDP	17,520	48.39
Guido Ganhinhin	Laban ng Demokratikong Pilipino	12,284	33.93
Fidelito Avanzado	Independent	6,321	17.46
Simeon Jaicten	Nationalist People's Coalition	80	0.22
Total		36,205	100.00
Source: Commission on Elections

== Sorsogon ==
=== Sorsogon's 1st district ===
Incumbent Salvador Escudero of the Lakas–NUCD–UMDP was re-elected to a third term.

Candidate	Party	Votes	%
Salvador Escudero (incumbent)	Lakas–NUCD–UMDP	37,384	44.24
Elizalde Diaz	PDP–Laban	24,800	29.35
Augusto Ortiz	Nationalist People's Coalition	20,956	24.80
Roberto Labitag	Independent	1,365	1.62
Total		84,505	100.00
Source: Commission on Elections

=== Sorsogon's 2nd district ===
Incumbent Bonifacio Gillego of Lakas–NUCD–UMDP was re-elected to a third term.

Candidate	Party	Votes	%
Bonifacio Gillego (incumbent)	Lakas–NUCD–UMDP	48,654	57.04
Jose Sabater	Nationalist People's Coalition	36,650	42.96
Total		85,304	100.00
Source: Commission on Elections

== South Cotabato ==
=== South Cotabato's 1st district ===
Incumbent Luwalhati Antonino of Lakas–NUCD–UMDP was re-elected to a second term.

Candidate	Party	Votes	%
Luwalhati Antonino (incumbent)	Lakas–NUCD–UMDP	65,468	54.92
Rufino Bañas	Independent	53,742	45.08
Total		119,210	100.00
Source: Commission on Elections

=== South Cotabato's 2nd district ===
Incumbent Daisy Avance Fuentes of Nationalist People's Coalition was re-elected to a second term.

Candidate	Party	Votes	%
Daisy Avance Fuentes (incumbent)	Nationalist People's Coalition	87,241	75.95
Ernesto Catedral	Lakas–NUCD–UMDP	27,620	24.05
Total		114,861	100.00
Source: Commission on Elections

== Southern Leyte ==
Incumbent Roger Mercado of Lakas–NUCD–UMDP was re-elected to a second term.

Candidate	Party	Votes	%
Roger Mercado (incumbent)	Lakas–NUCD–UMDP	61,837	51.57
Anecito Saludo	Nationalist People's Coalition	58,071	48.43
Total		119,908	100.00
Source: Commission on Elections

== Sultan Kudarat ==
Incumbent Estanislao Valdez of Lakas–NUCD–UMDP ran for a third term, but was defeated by Angelo Montilla of Lakas–NUCD–UMDP.

Candidate	Party	Votes	%
Angelo Montilla	Lakas–NUCD–UMDP	66,535	57.64
Estanislao Valdez (incumbent)	Lakas–NUCD–UMDP	48,892	42.36
Total		115,427	100.00
Source: Commission on Elections

== Sulu ==
=== Sulu's 1st district ===
Incumbent Bensaudi Tulawie of Lakas–NUCD–UMDP was re-elected to a second term.

Candidate	Party	Votes	%
Bensaudi Tulawie (incumbent)	Lakas–NUCD–UMDP	56,762	73.36
Hussin Loong	Independent	20,611	26.64
Total		77,373	100.00
Source: Commission on Elections

=== Sulu's 2nd district ===
Incumbent Asani Tammang of Lakas–NUCD–UMDP was re-elected to a second term.

Candidate	Party	Votes	%
Asani Tammang (incumbent)	Lakas–NUCD–UMDP	61,874	52.14
Arden Anni	Lakas–NUCD–UMDP	55,901	47.11
Parsons Nabiula	Kilusang Bagong Lipunan	867	0.73
Ahmed Tillah	Lakas–NUCD–UMDP	28	0.02
Total		118,670	100.00
Source: Commission on Elections

== Surigao del Norte ==
=== Surigao del Norte's 1st district ===
Incumbent Glenda Ecleo of the Nationalist People's Coalition ran for a third term, but was defeated by Constantino Navarro Jr. of Lakas–NUCD–UMDP.

Candidate	Party	Votes	%
Constantino Navarro Jr.	Lakas–NUCD–UMDP	38,729	52.44
Glenda Ecleo (incumbent)	Nationalist People's Coalition	34,997	47.39
Eugeneo Banibane III	Independent	129	0.17
Total		73,855	100.00
Source: Commission on Elections

=== Surigao del Norte's 2nd district ===
Incumbent Robert Barbers of Lakas–NUCD–UMDP was re-elected to a second term unopposed.

Candidate	Party	Votes	%
Robert Barbers (incumbent)	Lakas–NUCD–UMDP	65,849	100.00
Total		65,849	100.00
Source: Commission on Elections

== Surigao del Sur ==
=== Surigao del Sur's 1st district ===
Incumbent Mario Ty of Lakas–NUCD–UMDP was re-elected to a third term.

Candidate	Party	Votes	%
Mario Ty (incumbent)	Lakas–NUCD–UMDP	31,090	36.20
Mateo Tan	Lakas–NUCD–UMDP	30,011	34.94
Jesus Magno	Lakas–NUCD–UMDP	23,303	27.13
Geronimo Castaños	Independent	887	1.03
Augusto Arreza	Independent	599	0.70
Total		85,890	100.00
Source: Commission on Elections

=== Surigao del Sur's 2nd district ===
Incumbent Ernesto Estrella of Lakas–NUCD–UMDP ran for a third term, but was defeated by Jesnar Falcon of Lakas–NUCD–UMDP.

Candidate	Party	Votes	%
Jesnar Falcon	Lakas–NUCD–UMDP	26,884	39.48
Ernesto Estrella (incumbent)	Lakas–NUCD–UMDP	19,390	28.48
Remedios Alvizo	Lakas–NUCD–UMDP	15,726	23.10
Mamerto Alciso Jr.	Nationalist People's Coalition	6,088	8.94
Total		68,088	100.00
Source: Commission on Elections

== Taguig–Pateros ==
Incumbent Dante Tiñga of Lakas–NUCD–UMDP was re-elected to a third term.

Candidate	Party	Votes	%
Dante Tiñga (incumbent)	Lakas–NUCD–UMDP	62,057	57.40
Rafael Dizon	Laban ng Demokratikong Pilipino	43,924	40.63
Jose Bernabe	Nacionalista Party	2,136	1.98
Total		108,117	100.00
Source: Commission on Elections

== Tarlac ==
=== Tarlac's 1st district ===
Incumbent Peping Cojuangco of Laban ng Demokratikong Pilipino was re-elected to a third term.

Candidate	Party	Votes	%
Peping Cojuangco (incumbent)	Laban ng Demokratikong Pilipino	102,940	96.21
Paul Concepcion	Independent	3,785	3.54
Joseph Pamintuan	Lakas–NUCD–UMDP	265	0.25
Total		106,990	100.00
Source: Commission on Elections

=== Tarlac's 2nd district ===
Incumbent Jose Yap of Lakas–NUCD–UMDP was re-elected to a third term.

Candidate	Party	Votes	%
Jose Yap (incumbent)	Lakas–NUCD–UMDP	85,727	76.41
Liborio de Jesus	Laban ng Demokratikong Pilipino	23,877	21.28
Antonio Agustin	People's Reform Party	1,811	1.61
Ricardo Beltran	Lakas–NUCD–UMDP	772	0.69
Total		112,187	100.00
Source: Commission on Elections

=== Tarlac's 3rd district ===
Incumbent Herminio Aquino of Laban ng Demokratikong Pilipino was re-elected to a third term.

Candidate	Party	Votes	%
Herminio Aquino (incumbent)	Laban ng Demokratikong Pilipino	48,170	65.57
Nicolas Feliciano Jr.	Independent	25,240	34.36
Sol Lugay	Lakas–NUCD–UMDP	53	0.07
Total		73,463	100.00
Source: Commission on Elections

== Tawi-Tawi ==
Incumbent Nur Jaafar of Lakas–NUCD–UMDP was re-elected to a second term.

Candidate	Party	Votes	%
Nur Jaafar (incumbent)	Lakas–NUCD–UMDP	30,535	40.56
Ismael Abubakar Jr.	Independent	25,955	34.48
Alawadin Bandon Jr.	Independent	14,427	19.16
Abubakar Halun	Laban ng Demokratikong Pilipino	4,363	5.80
Total		75,280	100.00
Source: Commission on Elections

== Valenzuela ==
Incumbent Antonio Serapio of the Nationalist People's Coalition was re-elected to a third term.

Candidate	Party	Votes	%
Antonio Serapio (incumbent)	Nationalist People's Coalition	55,126	67.03
Eduardo Franco	Lakas–NUCD–UMDP	17,129	20.83
Melencio Cea	Nacionalista Party	9,989	12.15
Total		82,244	100.00
Source: Commission on Elections

== Zambales ==
=== Zambales' 1st district ===
Incumbent Katherine Gordon of the Nacionalista Party retired. The Nacionalista Party nominated James Gordon Jr., who won the election.

Candidate	Party	Votes	%
James Gordon Jr.	Nacionalista Party	49,000	49.54
Loretta de Llana	Lakas–NUCD–UMDP	40,327	40.77
Eduardo Piega	Laban ng Demokratikong Pilipino	9,589	9.69
Total		98,916	100.00
Source: Commission on Elections

=== Zambales' 2nd district ===
Incumbent Antonio Diaz of Lakas–NUCD–UMDP was re-elected to a second term.

Candidate	Party	Votes	%
Antonio Diaz (incumbent)	Lakas–NUCD–UMDP	62,810	66.79
Augusto Deloso	Independent	26,058	27.71
Joey Pareja	Independent	5,175	5.50
Total		94,043	100.00
Source: Commission on Elections

== Zamboanga City ==
Incumbent Maria Clara Lobregat of Laban ng Demokratikong Pilipino was re-elected to a third term.

Candidate	Party	Votes	%
Maria Clara Lobregat (incumbent)	Laban ng Demokratikong Pilipino	77,508	
Rafael Atilano	Liberal Party		
Julio Cesar Climaco	Nationalist People's Coalition		
Sharif Faruan Guilot	Laban ng Demokratikong Pilipino		
Total			
Source: Commission on Elections

== Zamboanga del Norte ==
=== Zamboanga del Norte's 1st district ===
Incumbent Artemio Adasa Jr. of Lakas–NUCD–UMDP ran for a third term, but was defeated by Romeo Jalosjos Sr., an independent.

Candidate	Party	Votes	%
Romeo Jalosjos Sr.	Independent	41,416	56.90
Artemio Adasa Jr. (incumbent)	Lakas–NUCD–UMDP	31,373	43.10
Total		72,789	100.00
Source: Commission on Elections

=== Zamboanga del Norte's 2nd district ===
Incumbent Ernesto Amatong of the Liberal Party ran for a third term, but was defeated Cresente Llorente Jr. of the Nationalist People's Coalition.

Candidate	Party	Votes	%
Cresente Llorente Jr.	Nationalist People's Coalition	47,150	50.96
Ernesto Amatong (incumbent)	Liberal Party	45,367	49.04
Total		92,517	100.00
Source: Commission on Elections

=== Zamboanga del Norte's 3rd district ===
Incumbent Angel Carloto of Lakas–NUCD–UMDP was re-elected to a third term.

Candidate	Party	Votes	%
Angel Carloto (incumbent)	Lakas–NUCD–UMDP	32,417	41.98
Jaime Lim	Lakas–NUCD–UMDP	27,605	35.75
Edgar Tarriela	Lakas–NUCD–UMDP	17,194	22.27
Total		77,216	100.00
Source: Commission on Elections

== Zamboanga del Sur ==
=== Zamboanga del Sur's 1st district ===
Incumbent Alejandro Urro of Lakas–NUCD–UMDP was re-elected to a second term.

Candidate	Party	Votes	%
Alejandro Urro (incumbent)	Lakas–NUCD–UMDP	76,698	71.44
Paquito Tabora	Laban ng Demokratikong Pilipino	29,708	27.67
Samuel Arcamo	Kilusang Bagong Lipunan	743	0.69
Sultan Elino Caba	Kilusang Bagong Lipunan	150	0.14
Delfin Agbu	Laban ng Demokratikong Pilipino	67	0.06
Total		107,366	100.00
Source: Commission on Elections

=== Zamboanga del Sur's 2nd district ===
Incumbent Antonio Cerilles of the Nationalist People's Coalition was re-elected to a third term.

Candidate	Party	Votes	%
Antonio Cerilles (incumbent)	Nationalist People's Coalition	45,450	58.67
Editho Pinga	Lakas–NUCD–UMDP	31,178	40.25
Jose Bersales	Laban ng Demokratikong Pilipino	748	0.97
Sultan George Ramirez	Kilusang Bagong Lipunan	93	0.12
Total		77,469	100.00
Source: Commission on Elections

=== Zamboanga del Sur's 3rd district ===
Incumbent Belma Cabilao of Lakas–NUCD–UMDP was re-elected to a second term.

Candidate	Party	Votes	%
Belma Cabilao (incumbent)	Lakas–NUCD–UMDP	51,019	50.97
Eric Palma	Nationalist People's Coalition	24,296	24.27
Jose Tiu	Laban ng Demokratikong Pilipino	24,237	24.21
Florentino Ducusin Sr.	Kilusang Bagong Lipunan	374	0.37
Reynaldo Tecechian	Independent	166	0.17
Total		100,092	100.00
Source: Commission on Elections
