= 2004 Philippine gubernatorial elections =

- May 10, 2004

All 79 provincial governorships
	First party	Second party
Party	Lakas	NPC
Last election	28	17
Seats before	44	16
Seats after	39	12
Seat change	▼5	▼4
	Third party	Fourth party
Party	Liberal	LDP
Last election	5	10
Seats before	9	5
Seats after	8	7
Seat change	▼1	▲2
President of the League of Provinces of the Philippines before election
Rodolfo del Rosario (Davao del Norte)
Lakas
Elected President of the League of Provinces of the Philippines
Erico Aumentado (Bohol)
Lakas

Gubernatorial elections were held in the Philippines on May 10, 2004. All provinces will elect their provincial governors for three-year terms, who will be inaugurated on June 30, 2004, after their proclamation. Governors that are currently serving their third consecutive terms are prohibited from running as governors (they may run for any other posts however).

Metro Manila and highly urbanized and independent component cities such as Angeles City, Cebu City and Davao City are outside the jurisdiction of any province and thus do not run elections for governors of their mother provinces (Pampanga, Cebu and Davao del Sur respectively). These shall elect mayors instead.

== Luzon ==
- Note: All incumbents are marked in Italics.

=== Ilocos Region ===
==== Ilocos Norte ====
Ilocos Norte gubernatorial election
Candidate	Party	Votes	%
Ferdinand Marcos Jr.	Kilusang Bagong Lipunan	111,657	100.00
Total		111,657	100.00
Kilusang Bagong Lipunan hold			

==== Ilocos Sur ====
Ilocos Sur gubernatorial election
Candidate	Party	Votes	%
Luis Singson	Lakas–CMD	157,869	57.94
Efren Rafanan	Laban ng Demokratikong Pilipino	114,614	42.06
Total		272,483	100.00
Lakas–CMD hold			

==== La Union ====
La Union gubernatorial election
Candidate	Party	Votes	%
Victor Francisco Ortega	Lakas–CMD	197,869	69.61
Thomas Dumpit Jr.	Laban ng Demokratikong Pilipino	86,384	30.39
Total		284,253	100.00
Lakas–CMD hold			

==== Pangasinan ====
Pangasinan gubernatorial election
Candidate	Party	Votes	%
Victor Aguedo Agbayani	Lakas–CMD	840,009	92.92
Marietta Primicias–Goco	PDP–Laban	64,050	7.08
Total		904,059	100.00
Lakas–CMD hold			

=== Cagayan Valley ===
==== Batanes ====
Batanes gubernatorial election
Candidate	Party	Votes	%
Vicente Gato	Liberal Party	4,590	60.18
German Caccam	Lakas–CMD	3,037	39.82
Total		7,627	100.00
Liberal Party hold			

==== Cagayan ====
Cagayan gubernatorial election
Candidate	Party	Votes	%
Edgar Lara	Nationalist People's Coalition	268,813	77.11
Leonides Fausto	Lakas–CMD	76,730	22.01
Jose Perez	Independent	1,988	0.57
Joven Delos Santos	Independent	1,058	0.30
Total		348,589	100.00
Nationalist People's Coalition hold			

==== Isabela ====
Isabela gubernatorial election
Candidate	Party	Votes	%
Ma. Gracia Cielo Padaca	Aksyon Demokratiko	242,995	54.66
Faustino Dy Jr.	Nationalist People's Coalition	198,703	44.70
Charlito Amurao	Independent	1,511	0.34
Mariano Barillo	Partido Isang Bansa, Isang Diwa	932	0.21
Manuel Siquian	Laban ng Demokratikong Pilipino	390	0.09
Total		444,531	100.00
Aksyon Demokratiko gain from Nationalist People's Coalition			

==== Nueva Vizcaya ====
Nueva Vizcaya gubernatorial election
Candidate	Party	Votes	%
Luisa Cuaresma	Laban ng Demokratikong Pilipino	56,008	39.64
Leonardo Byron Perez	Nationalist People's Coalition	53,227	37.67
Ernesto Salun-at	Lakas–CMD	32,062	22.69
Total		141,297	100.00
Laban ng Demokratikong Pilipino hold			

==== Quirino ====
Quirino gubernatorial election
Candidate	Party	Votes	%
Pedro Bacani	Liberal Party	49,154	85.32
Lorenzo Itchon Jr.	Independent	8,457	14.68
Total		57,611	100.00
Liberal Party hold			

=== Cordillera Administrative Region ===
==== Abra ====
Abra gubernatorial election
Candidate	Party	Votes	%
Vicente Valera	Nationalist People's Coalition	69,662	75.66
Roger Luna	Liberal Party	22,414	24.34
Total		92,076	100.00
Nationalist People's Coalition hold			

==== Apayao ====
Apayao gubernatorial election
Candidate	Party	Votes	%
Elias Bulut Sr.	Pwersa ng Masang Pilipino	34,374	92.17
Ambaro Sagle	Independent	2,265	6.07
Robert Angco	Independent	655	1.76
Total		37,294	100.00
Pwersa ng Masang Pilipino hold			

==== Benguet ====
Benguet gubernatorial election
Candidate	Party	Votes	%
Borromeo Melchor	Laban ng Demokratikong Pilipino	46,630	37.56
Edna Tabanda	Nationalist People's Coalition	42,671	34.37
Robert Tinda-an	Lakas–CMD	32,508	26.18
Abundio Awal	Laban ng Demokratikong Pilipino	2,342	1.89
Total		124,151	100.00
Laban ng Demokratikong Pilipino gain from Nationalist People's Coalition			

==== Ifugao ====
Ifugao gubernatorial election
Candidate	Party	Votes	%
Benjamin Cappleman	Independent	27,651	39.87
Teodoro Baguilat Jr.	Lakas–CMD	26,760	38.58
Alex Kindipan	Liberal Party	14,838	21.39
Manuel Dangayo	Independent	111	0.16
Total		69,360	100.00
Independent gain from Lakas–CMD			

==== Kalinga ====
Kalinga gubernatorial election
Candidate	Party	Votes	%
Dominador Belac	Liberal Party	39,712	50.98
Macario Duguiang	Nationalist People's Coalition	38,178	49.02
Total		77,890	100.00
Liberal Party gain from Nationalist People's Coalition			

==== Mountain Province ====
Mountain Province gubernatorial election
Candidate	Party	Votes	%
Maximo Dalog	Laban ng Demokratikong Pilipino	22,883	36.58
Leonard Mayaen	Independent	16,627	26.58
Sario Malinias	Laban ng Demokratikong Pilipino	13,442	21.49
Harry Dominguez	Nationalist People's Coalition	9,611	15.36
Total		62,563	100.00
Laban ng Demokratikong Pilipino gain from Laban ng Demokratikong Pilipino			

=== Central Luzon ===
==== Aurora ====
Aurora gubernatorial election
Candidate	Party	Votes	%
Bellaflor Angara	Laban ng Demokratikong Pilipino	44,635	61.78
Edgardo Ong	Independent	27,561	38.15
Hardy Callos	Partido Isang Bansa, Isang Diwa	47	0.07
Total		72,243	100.00
Laban ng Demokratikong Pilipino gain from Lakas–CMD			

==== Bataan ====
Bataan gubernatorial election
Candidate	Party	Votes	%
Enrique Garcia Jr.	Lakas–CMD	145,431	52.80
Rogelio Roque	Nationalist People's Coalition	114,312	41.50
Zenaida Gonzales	Partido Demokratiko Sosyalista ng Pilipinas	15,252	5.54
Ramson Cordero	Partido Isang Bansa, Isang Diwa	283	0.10
Remedios Balbino	Independent	152	0.06
Total		275,430	100.00
Lakas–CMD gain from Nationalist People's Coalition			

==== Bulacan ====
Bulacan gubernatorial election
Candidate	Party	Votes	%
Josefina Dela Cruz	Lakas–CMD	788,892	88.89
Rommel Maganto	Pwersa ng Masang Pilipino	97,449	10.98
Danny Senosin	Democratic Group for Integrity and Progress in the Philippines	1,174	0.13
Total		887,515	100.00
Lakas–CMD hold			

==== Nueva Ecija ====
Nueva Ecija gubernatorial election
Candidate	Party	Votes	%
Tomas Joson III (Note: Also a member of the Nationalist People's Coalition.)	Bagong Lakas ng Nueva Ecija	394,870	53.96
Julita Villareal	Kabalikat ng Malayang Pilipino	335,613	45.86
Dominador Alvaran	Independent	1,276	0.17
Total		731,759	100.00
Bagong Lakas ng Nueva Ecija hold			

==== Pampanga ====
Pampanga gubernatorial election
Candidate	Party	Votes	%
Mark Lapid	Lakas–CMD	357,281	54.07
Juan Pablo Bondoc	Nationalist People's Coalition	173,520	26.26
Zenaida Cruz-Ducut	Nagkakaisang Partido ng mga Kapampangan	129,582	19.61
Clark Field Arroño III	Independent	366	0.06
Total		660,749	100.00
Lakas–CMD hold			

==== Tarlac ====
Tarlac gubernatorial election
Candidate	Party	Votes	%
Jose Villa Yap Sr.	Nationalist People's Coalition	309,628	79.39
Isaias Apostol	Lakas–CMD	69,978	17.94
Pedro Aquino	Partido Isang Bansa, Isang Diwa	5,234	1.34
Nicolas Feliciano Jr.	Independent	1,848	0.47
Antonio Agustin	Independent	1,662	0.43
Ernesto Calma	Independent	1,172	0.30
Feliciano Maliwa	Independent	483	0.12
Total		390,005	100.00
Nationalist People's Coalition hold			

==== Zambales ====
Zambales gubernatorial election
Candidate	Party	Votes	%
Vicente Magsaysay	Lakas–CMD	107,439	57.10
Cheryl Deloso–Montalla	Partido para sa Demokratikong Reporma–Lapiang Manggagawa	80,717	42.90
Total		188,156	100.00
Lakas–CMD hold			

=== Calabarzon ===
==== Batangas ====
Batangas gubernatorial election
Candidate	Party	Votes	%
Armando Sanchez	Liberal Party	305,631	36.81
Rosario Apacible	Laban ng Demokratikong Pilipino	248,304	29.91
Hernando Perez	Lakas–CMD	216,787	26.11
Nicomedes Hernandez	Partido para sa Demokratikong Reporma–Lapiang Manggagawa	36,094	4.35
Marcos Mandanas Sr.	Independent	21,157	2.55
Arturo Atienza	Independent	2,249	0.27
Total		830,222	100.00
Liberal Party hold			

==== Cavite ====
Cavite gubernatorial election
Candidate	Party	Votes	%
Erineo Maliksi	Laban ng Demokratikong Pilipino	605,376	73.69
Epimaco Velasco	Lakas–CMD	214,083	26.06
Virginia Uy	Democratic Group for Integrity and Progress in the Philippines	2,008	0.24
Total		821,467	100.00
Laban ng Demokratikong Pilipino hold			

==== Laguna ====
Laguna gubernatorial election
Candidate	Party	Votes	%
Teresita Lazaro	Lakas–CMD	317,116	35.32
Danilo Ramon Fernandez	Partido Demokratiko Sosyalista ng Pilipinas	302,654	33.71
Rodolfo San Luis	Laban ng Demokratikong Pilipino	278,108	30.97
Total		897,878	100.00
Lakas–CMD hold			

==== Quezon ====
Quezon gubernatorial election
Candidate	Party	Votes	%
Wilfrido Enverga	Koalisyon ng Nagkakaisang Pilipino	373,399	71.83
Serafin Dator	Liberal Party	87,430	16.82
Frumencio Pulgar	Lakas–CMD	58,983	11.35
Total		519,812	100.00
Koalisyon ng Nagkakaisang Pilipino hold			

==== Rizal ====
Rizal gubernatorial election
Candidate	Party	Votes	%
Casimiro Ynares Jr.	Pwersa ng Masang Pilipino	463,320	72.91
Jovita Rodriguez	Independent	165,174	25.99
Romeo Oliva	Partido Isang Bansa, Isang Diwa	7,017	1.10
Total		635,511	100.00
Pwersa ng Masang Pilipino hold			

=== Mimaropa ===
==== Marinduque ====
Marinduque gubernatorial election
Candidate	Party	Votes	%
Carmencita Reyes	Lakas–CMD	53,709	61.49
Jose Antonio Carrion	Nationalist People's Coalition	17,727	20.30
Roberto Madla	Pwersa ng Masang Pilipino	11,969	13.70
Rosa Lecaroz	Independent	3,940	4.51
Total		87,345	100.00
Lakas–CMD hold			

==== Occidental Mindoro ====
Occidental Mindoro gubernatorial election
Candidate	Party	Votes	%
Josephine Sato	Nationalist People's Coalition	80,585	58.54
Jose Villarosa	Lakas–CMD	57,067	41.46
Total		137,652	100.00
Nationalist People's Coalition gain from Lakas–CMD			

==== Oriental Mindoro ====
Oriental Mindoro gubernatorial election
Candidate	Party	Votes	%
Bartolome Marasigan Sr.	Lakas–CMD	135,064	56.39
Thaddeus Venturanza	Independent	104,454	43.61
Total		239,518	100.00
Lakas–CMD hold			

==== Palawan ====
Palawan gubernatorial election
Candidate	Party	Votes	%
Mario Joel Reyes	Lakas–CMD	141,113	51.89
Vicente Sandoval	Liberal Party	90,613	33.32
Gerardo Ortega	PDP–Laban	39,414	14.49
Mark Buncag	Independent	416	0.15
Alexander Garcia	Independent	398	0.15
Total		271,954	100.00
Lakas–CMD hold			

==== Romblon ====
Romblon gubernatorial election
Candidate	Party	Votes	%
Perpetuo Ylagan	Nationalist People's Coalition	45,058	44.17
Pacifico Mayor	Partido Demokratiko Sosyalista ng Pilipinas	25,351	24.85
Romeo Robiso	Laban ng Demokratikong Pilipino	19,733	19.35
Jose Cesar Cabrera	Laban ng Demokratikong Pilipino	11,863	11.63
Total		102,005	100.00
Nationalist People's Coalition gain from Lakas–CMD			

=== Bicol Region ===
==== Albay ====
Albay gubernatorial election
Candidate	Party	Votes	%
Fernando Gonzales	Independent	188,318	44.45
Alfonso Bichara	Lakas–CMD	142,925	33.73
Brando Sael (Note: Also a member of the Koalisyon ng Nagkakaisang Pilipino.)	Pwersa ng Masang Pilipino	46,913	11.07
Remedios Manzanilla	Aksyon Demokratiko	36,850	8.70
Sotero Llamas	Laban ng Demokratikong Pilipino	8,691	2.05
Total		423,697	100.00
Independent gain from Lakas–CMD			

==== Camarines Norte ====
Camarines Norte gubernatorial election
Candidate	Party	Votes	%
Jesus Typoco Jr.	Lakas–CMD	92,129	55.11
Casimiro Roy Padilla Jr.	Nationalist People's Coalition	51,953	31.08
Emmanuel Pimentel	Laban ng Demokratikong Pilipino	22,925	13.71
Agustin Villagracia	Partido Isang Bansa, Isang Diwa	155	0.09
Total		167,162	100.00
Lakas–CMD hold			

==== Camarines Sur ====
Camarines Sur gubernatorial election
Candidate	Party	Votes	%
Luis Raymund Villafuerte Jr.	Lakas–CMD	246,785	49.65
Felix William Fuentebella	Nationalist People's Coalition	151,716	30.53
Emmanuel Alfelor Sr. (Note: Also a member of the Lakas–CMD.)	Liberal Party	97,937	19.70
Sadam Delfin Sr.	Independent	261	0.05
Jose Beltrano	Partido Isang Bansa, Isang Diwa	187	0.04
Romeo Marpuri	Independent	133	0.03
Total		497,019	100.00
Lakas–CMD hold			

==== Catanduanes ====
Catanduanes gubernatorial election
Candidate	Party	Votes	%
Leandro Verceles Jr.	Lakas–CMD	43,801	48.27
Joseph Cua	Kabalikat ng Malayang Pilipino	41,622	45.87
Evelyn San Ramon	Partido Demokratiko Sosyalista ng Pilipinas	1,762	1.94
Susan Ubalde–Ordinario	Laban ng Demokratikong Pilipino	1,560	1.72
Juan Zafe	Independent	984	1.08
Joanetto Victor Romano	Independent	754	0.83
Salvador Gianan	Independent	175	0.19
Allan Tebelin	Independent	87	0.10
Total		90,745	100.00
Lakas–CMD Hold			

==== Masbate ====
Masbate gubernatorial election
Candidate	Party	Votes	%
Antonio Kho	Lakas–CMD	122,402	50.49
Fausto Seachon Jr.	Nationalist People's Coalition	119,478	49.29
Sirnante Villar	Independent	361	0.15
Salem Abubakar	Independent	172	0.07
Total		242,413	100.00
Lakas–CMD hold			

==== Sorsogon ====
Sorsogon gubernatorial election
Candidate	Party	Votes	%
Raul Lee	Lakas–CMD	126,856	55.47
Josephine Frivaldo (Note: Also a member of the PDP–Laban.)	Nationalist People's Coalition	100,449	43.92
Pedro Terrado Jr.	Independent	1,404	0.61
Total		228,709	100.00
Lakas–CMD hold			

== Visayas ==
- Note: All incumbents are marked in Italics.

=== Western Visayas ===
==== Aklan ====
Aklan gubernatorial election
Candidate	Party	Votes	%
Carlito Marquez	Lakas–CMD	78,581	40.19
Victoria Ramos	Pwersa ng Masang Pilipino	71,123	36.38
Efren Fernandez	Lakas–CMD	45,816	23.43
Total		195,520	100.00
Lakas–CMD hold			

==== Antique ====
Antique gubernatorial election
Candidate	Party	Votes	%
Salvacion Perez	Liberal Party	95,368	55.01
Roberto Operiano	Lakas–CMD	78,012	44.99
Total		173,380	100.00
Liberal Party hold			

==== Capiz ====
Capiz gubernatorial election
Candidate	Party	Votes	%
Vicente Bermejo	Liberal Party	204,785	98.98
Zenon Amoroso	Independent	2,100	1.02
Total		206,885	100.00
Liberal Party hold			

==== Guimaras ====
Guimaras gubernatorial election
Candidate	Party	Votes	%
Joaquin Carlos Nava	Liberal Party	42,127	72.31
Arturo Fernandez	Lakas–CMD	16,135	27.69
Total		58,262	100.00
Liberal Party hold			

==== Iloilo ====
Iloilo gubernatorial election
Candidate	Party	Votes	%
Niel Tupas Sr.	Liberal Party	416,593	62.00
Oscar Garin Sr.	Lakas–CMD	254,751	37.91
Nolbert Gil	Independent	601	0.09
Total		671,945	100.00
Liberal Party hold			

==== Negros Occidental ====
Negros Occidental gubernatorial election
Candidate	Party	Votes	%
Joseph Marañon	Nationalist People's Coalition	424,739	81.84
Delia Ediltrudes Locsin	Independent	94,249	18.16
Total		518,988	100.00
Nationalist People's Coalition hold			

=== Central Visayas ===
==== Bohol ====
Bohol gubernatorial election
Candidate	Party	Votes	%
Erico Aumentado	Lakas–CMD	238,497	54.32
Rene Relampagos	Kabalikat ng Malayang Pilipino	200,038	45.56
Peter Pelegrino	Independent	535	0.12
Total		439,070	100.00
Lakas–CMD hold			

==== Cebu ====
Cebu gubernatorial election
Candidate	Party	Votes	%
Gwendolyn Garcia–Codilla	Lakas–CMD	405,852	39.64
Celestino Martinez Jr.	Independent	398,323	38.90
John Henry Gregory Osmeña Jr.	Nationalist People's Coalition	209,728	20.48
Welfredo Tuadles	Pwersa ng Masang Pilipino	6,391	0.62
Rafael Cezar Jr.	Independent	3,620	0.35
Total		1,023,914	100.00
Lakas–CMD hold			

==== Negros Oriental ====
Negros Oriental gubernatorial election
Candidate	Party	Votes	%
George Arnaiz	Nationalist People's Coalition	301,315	98.51
Lorenzo Tayhon	Independent	4,556	1.49
Total		305,871	100.00
Nationalist People's Coalition hold			

==== Siquijor ====
Siquijor gubernatorial election
Candidate	Party	Votes	%
Orlando Fua Sr.	Lakas–CMD	23,554	52.33
Dean Villa	Nationalist People's Coalition	20,380	45.27
Arthur Chan	Pwersa ng Masang Pilipino	1,080	2.40
Total		45,014	100.00
Lakas–CMD hold			

=== Eastern Visayas ===
==== Biliran ====
Biliran gubernatorial election
Candidate	Party	Votes	%
Rogelio Espina	Lakas–CMD	44,528	72.52
Ranulfo Verian (Note: Also a member of the Pwersa ng Masang Pilipino.)	Laban ng Demokratikong Pilipino	16,734	27.25
Mariano Rosario	Democratic Group for Integrity and Progress in the Philippines	139	0.23
Total		61,401	100.00
Lakas–CMD hold			

==== Eastern Samar ====
Eastern Samar gubernatorial election
Candidate	Party	Votes	%
Ben Evardone	Laban ng Demokratikong Pilipino	75,445	50.20
Clotilde Hilaria Salazar	Nationalist People's Coalition	49,107	32.68
Ruperto Ambil Jr.	Laban ng Demokratikong Pilipino	25,549	17.00
Jose Castillo	Democratic Group for Integrity and Progress in the Philippines	185	0.12
Total		150,286	100.00
Laban ng Demokratikong Pilipino gain from Nationalist People's Coalition			

==== Leyte ====
Leyte gubernatorial election
Candidate	Party	Votes	%
Carlos Jericho Petilla	Nationalist People's Coalition	257,609	52.76
Sergio Antonio Apostol	Lakas–CMD	222,273	45.52
Adolfo Larrazabal	Partido para sa Demokratikong Reporma–Lapiang Manggagawa	4,771	0.98
Roberto Sotto	Independent	2,316	0.47
Hermela Pagayanan	Nacionalista Party	1,306	0.27
Total		488,275	100.00
Nationalist People's Coalition hold			

==== Northern Samar ====
Northern Samar gubernatorial election
Candidate	Party	Votes	%
Raul Daza	Liberal Party	110,681	74.41
Sixto Balanquit Jr.	Independent	36,368	24.45
Teddy Morales	Kilusang Bagong Lipunan	931	0.63
Serafin Cabacang Jr.	Democratic Group for Integrity and Progress in the Philippines	757	0.51
Total		148,737	100.00
Liberal Party hold			

==== Samar ====
Samar gubernatorial election
Candidate	Party	Votes	%
Milagrosa Tan	Liberal Party	131,761	55.11
Mario Roño	Independent	77,188	32.28
Melchor Nacario	Partido Demokratiko Sosyalista ng Pilipinas	28,380	11.87
Claro Piczon	Independent	1,502	0.63
Renato Llamado	Independent	259	0.11
Total		239,090	100.00
Liberal Party hold			

==== Southern Leyte ====
Southern Leyte gubernatorial election
Candidate	Party	Votes	%
Rosette Lerias	Nationalist People's Coalition	107,596	68.58
Ma. Salvacion Saludo	Pwersa ng Masang Pilipino	48,911	31.18
Gil Parmis	Democratic Group for Integrity and Progress in the Philippines	380	0.24
Total		156,887	100.00
Nationalist People's Coalition hold			

== Mindanao ==
=== Zamboanga Peninsula ===
==== Zamboanga del Norte ====
Zamboanga del Norte gubernatorial election
Candidate	Party	Votes	%
Rolando Yebes	Partido Demokratiko Sosyalista ng Pilipinas	173,091	51.35
Isagani Amatong	Lakas–CMD	163,965	48.65
Total		337,056	100.00
Partido Demokratiko Sosyalista ng Pilipinas gain from Lakas–CMD			

==== Zamboanga del Sur ====
Zamboanga del Sur gubernatorial election
Candidate	Party	Votes	%
Aurora Cerilles	Nationalist People's Coalition	169,188	53.78
Romeo Vera Cruz	Lakas–CMD	145,103	46.12
Fernando Polon	Independent	186	0.06
Gadiel Cadallo	Partido Isang Bansa, Isang Diwa	129	0.04
Total		314,606	100.00
Nationalist People's Coalition hold			

==== Zamboanga Sibugay ====
Zamboanga Sibugay gubernatorial election
Candidate	Party	Votes	%
George Hofer	Laban ng Demokratikong Pilipino	68,106	41.55
Eugenio Famor	Lakas–CMD	54,503	33.25
Alfredo Chu	Pwersa ng Masang Pilipino	40,985	25.00
Lodrito Sabaiton	Independent	337	0.21
Total		163,931	100.00
Laban ng Demokratikong Pilipino hold			

=== Northern Mindanao ===
==== Bukidnon ====
Bukidnon gubernatorial election
Candidate	Party	Votes	%
Jose Ma. Zubiri Jr.	Lakas–CMD	333,769	88.84
Ernesto Tabios	Laban ng Demokratikong Pilipino	27,898	7.43
Wilhelmina Catane	Partido Demokratiko Sosyalista ng Pilipinas	12,030	3.20
Joel Valendez	Partido Isang Bansa, Isang Diwa	1,555	0.41
Alfredo Kiniman	Independent	436	0.12
Total		375,688	100.00
Lakas–CMD hold			

==== Camiguin ====
Camiguin gubernatorial election
Candidate	Party	Votes	%
Pedro Romualdo	Lakas–CMD	32,095	79.65
Jose Antonio Gabucan	Laban ng Demokratikong Pilipino	8,200	20.35
Total		40,295	100.00
Lakas–CMD hold			

==== Lanao del Norte ====
Lanao del Norte gubernatorial election
Candidate	Party	Votes	%
Imelda Dimaporo	Lakas–CMD	135,984	72.51
Abdullah Mangotara	Koalisyon ng Nagkakaisang Pilipino	51,221	27.31
Ibrahimabul Malik Angni	Partido Isang Bansa, Isang Diwa	333	0.18
Total		187,538	100.00
Lakas–CMD hold			

==== Misamis Occidental ====
Misamis Occidental gubernatorial election
Candidate	Party	Votes	%
Loreto Leo Ocampos	Lakas–CMD	179,955	92.16
Connie Bernardino	Pwersa ng Masang Pilipino	11,526	5.90
Christopher Ramayrat	Laban ng Demokratikong Pilipino	3,781	1.94
Total		195,262	100.00
Lakas–CMD hold			

==== Misamis Oriental ====
Misamis Oriental gubernatorial election
Candidate	Party	Votes	%
Oscar Moreno	Lakas–CMD	195,239	66.47
Antonio Calingin	Laban ng Demokratikong Pilipino	96,741	32.93
Elizabeth Aragon	Democratic Group for Integrity and Progress in the Philippines	804	0.27
Vicente Calo Jr.	Independent	745	0.25
Richard Guillar	Partido Isang Bansa, Isang Diwa	210	0.07
Total		293,739	100.00
Lakas–CMD gain from Laban ng Demokratikong Pilipino			

=== Davao Region ===
==== Compostela Valley ====
Compostela Valley gubernatorial election
Candidate	Party	Votes	%
Jose Caballero	Lakas–CMD	158,893	80.30
Trino Tirol	Nationalist People's Coalition	38,393	19.40
Rodrigo Pajarito Sr.	Independent	594	0.30
Total		197,880	100.00
Lakas–CMD hold			

==== Davao del Norte ====
Davao del Norte gubernatorial election
Candidate	Party	Votes	%
Gelacio Gementiza	Lakas–CMD	226,120	83.68
Roberto Sebastian	Partido para sa Demokratikong Reporma–Lapiang Manggagawa	40,419	14.96
Alejandro Adalin	Democratic Group for Integrity and Progress in the Philippines	2,266	0.84
Danilo Concepcion	Independent	1,424	0.53
Total		270,229	100.00
Lakas–CMD hold			

==== Davao del Sur ====
Davao del Sur gubernatorial election
Candidate	Party	Votes	%
Benjamin Bautista Jr.	Nationalist People's Coalition	144,932	53.37
Fe Llanos	Lakas–CMD	125,680	46.28
Carlos Roldan	Independent	949	0.35
Total		271,561	100.00
Nationalist People's Coalition gain from Lakas–CMD			

==== Davao Oriental ====
Davao Oriental gubernatorial election
Candidate	Party	Votes	%
Ma. Elena Palma Gil	Lakas–CMD	82,564	51.48
Thelma Almario	Kabalikat ng Malayang Pilipino	77,819	48.52
Total		160,383	100.00
Lakas–CMD hold			

=== Soccsksargen ===
==== Cotabato ====
Cotabato gubernatorial election
Candidate	Party	Votes	%
Emmanuel Piñol	Lakas–CMD	277,683	75.35
Rolando Pelonio Sr.	Partido Demokratiko Sosyalista ng Pilipinas	87,832	23.83
Garcia Makalilay	Independent	2,286	0.62
Julito Fortines	United Independence Party	713	0.19
Total		368,514	100.00
Lakas–CMD hold			

==== Sarangani ====
Sarangani gubernatorial election
Candidate	Party	Votes	%
Paul Rene Dominguez	Sarangani Reconciliation and Reformation Organization	81,556	60.84
Miguel Escobar	Lakas–CMD	43,056	32.12
Lito Mondragon	Laban ng Demokratikong Pilipino	8,853	6.60
Raymond Manlunas	Pwersa ng Masang Pilipino	574	0.43
Total		134,039	100.00
Sarangani Reconciliation and Reformation Organization gain from Lakas–CMD			

==== South Cotabato ====
South Cotabato gubernatorial election
Candidate	Party	Votes	%
Daisy Avance Fuentes	Nationalist People's Coalition	145,984	56.11
Hilario De Pedro III	Lakas–CMD	113,758	43.72
Rachel Bigay	Independent	442	0.17
Total		260,184	100.00
Nationalist People's Coalition hold			

==== Sultan Kudarat ====
Sultan Kudarat gubernatorial election
Candidate	Party	Votes	%
Pakung Mangudadatu	Lakas–CMD	119,255	60.37
Angelo Montilla	Nationalist People's Coalition	77,804	39.39
Loney Publico	Laban ng Demokratikong Pilipino	359	0.18
Datu Ben Delangalen	Partido Isang Bansa, Isang Diwa	126	0.06
Total		197,544	100.00
Lakas–CMD hold			

=== Caraga ===
==== Agusan del Norte ====
Agusan del Norte gubernatorial election
Candidate	Party	Votes	%
Erlpe John Amante	Lakas–CMD	64,198	51.98
Nilo Soliva	Liberal Party	58,808	47.61
Saturnino Cupin	Independent	504	0.41
Total		123,510	100.00
Lakas–CMD hold			

==== Agusan del Sur ====
Agusan del Sur gubernatorial election
Candidate	Party	Votes	%
Adolph Edward Plaza	Lakas–CMD	113,662	64.99
Ceferino Paredes Jr.	Partido Demokratiko Sosyalista ng Pilipinas	59,959	34.28
Elmor Baylon	Democratic Group for Integrity and Progress in the Philippines	1,273	0.73
Total		174,894	100.00
Lakas–CMD hold			

==== Surigao del Norte ====
Surigao del Norte gubernatorial election
Candidate	Party	Votes	%
Robert Lyndon Barbers	Lakas–CMD	118,101	53.64
Francisco Matugas	Pwersa ng Masang Pilipino	102,092	46.36
Total		220,193	100.00
Lakas–CMD hold			

==== Surigao del Sur ====
Surigao del Sur gubernatorial election
Candidate	Party	Votes	%
Vicente Pimentel Jr.	Lakas–CMD	140,706	73.52
Mateo Tan	Pwersa ng Masang Pilipino	50,677	26.48
Total		191,383	100.00
Lakas–CMD hold			

=== Autonomous Region in Muslim Mindanao ===
==== Basilan ====
Basilan gubernatorial election
Candidate	Party	Votes	%
Ustadz Wahab Akbar	Lakas–CMD	83,432	
Hadjiman Hataman–Salliman	Liberal Party		
Ojong Amil	Pwersa ng Masang Pilipino		
Sahidullah Pakirullah	Independent		
Ustadz Mohammed Ambil	Partido Isang Bansa, Isang Diwa		
Mahmud Sucok	Independent		
Total			
Lakas–CMD hold			

==== Lanao del Sur ====
Lanao del Sur gubernatorial election
Candidate	Party	Votes	%
Mamintal Adiong Sr.	Lakas–CMD	94,557	
Dimalotang Basar Ali	People's Leadership Party		
Omarbasha Lucma	Partido Demokratiko Sosyalista ng Pilipinas		
Saadoddin Sarip	Pwersa ng Masang Pilipino		
Yusoph Yanya	Independent		
Omar Barangai	Independent		
Ameroddin Sarangani	Pwersa ng Masang Pilipino		
Mapupuno Bacol	Partido Isang Bansa, Isang Diwa		
Farouk Maruhombsar Cali	Laban ng Demokratikong Pilipino		
Bobby Datimbang	Laban ng Demokratikong Pilipino		
Dimapuno Datu	Aksyon Demokratiko		
Mahid Mutilan	Ompia Party		
Total			
Lakas–CMD hold			

==== Maguindanao ====
Maguindanao gubernatorial election
Candidate	Party	Votes	%
Andal Ampatuan Sr.	Lakas–CMD	218,018	80.00
Guimid Matalam	Islamic Party of the Philippines	54,494	20.00
Total		272,512	100.00
Lakas–CMD hold			

==== Sulu ====
Sulu gubernatorial election
Candidate	Party	Votes	%
Benjamin Loong	Lakas–CMD	46,921	31.33
Yusop Jikiri	Lakas–CMD	39,953	26.68
Abdusakur Mahail Tan	Pwersa ng Masang Pilipino	36,336	24.27
Nurallaji Misuari	Independent	25,320	16.91
Hadji Ramon Gonzales	Kilusang Bagong Lipunan	765	0.51
Kadra Masihul	Independent	270	0.18
Sukarno Sappayani	Kilusang Bagong Lipunan	177	0.12
Total		149,742	100.00
Lakas–CMD gain from Lakas–CMD			

==== Tawi-Tawi ====
Tawi-Tawi gubernatorial election
Candidate	Party	Votes	%
Hadji Sadikul Sahali	Pwersa ng Masang Pilipino	40,492	
Rashidin Matba	Lakas–CMD		
Abduhasan Sali	Laban ng Demokratikong Pilipino		
Nazif Ahmad Abdurahman	Partido para sa Demokratikong Reporma–Lapiang Manggagawa		
Ibrahim Albani	Kilusang Bagong Lipunan		
Namli Yacob	Partido Isang Bansa, Isang Diwa		
Abdulkarim Ladjamatli	Independent		
Total			
Pwersa ng Masang Pilipino gain from Lakas–CMD			
