= Zenaida Cruz-Ducut =

Filipino lawyer and politician (born 1956)

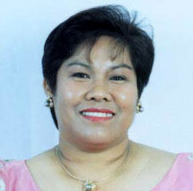
- Cruz-Ducut in 2004

Chairman of the Energy Regulatory Commission
- In office July 10, 2008 – July 10, 2015
- Appointed by: Gloria Macapagal Arroyo
- Preceded by: Rodolfo Albano Jr.
- Succeeded by: Jose Vicente Salazar

Member of the House of Representatives from Pampanga's 2nd District
- In office June 30, 1995 – June 30, 2004
- Preceded by: Emigdio Lingad
- Succeeded by: Mikey Arroyo

Member of the Lubao Municipal Council
- In office June 30, 1992 – June 30, 1995

Personal details
- Born: February 5, 1956 (age 70) Lubao, Pampanga, Philippines
- Party: Independent (2004–present)
- Other political affiliations: NPK (2003–2004); LAMMP (1998–2001); NPC (1995–2004)
- Spouse: Crisanto Ducut
- Children: 4
- Education: Far Eastern University (AB) (LL.B.)
- Profession: Lawyer, politician

Zenaida Garcia Cruz-Ducut (born February 5, 1956) is a Filipino lawyer and former politician. She represented the Pampanga's 2nd district in the House of Representatives of the Philippines from 1995 to 2004. She served as chairman of the Energy Regulatory Commission from 2008 to 2015.

== Early life and education ==
Cruz-Ducut was born on February 5, 1956 at Barangay Santa Catalina in Lubao, Pampanga to Bienvenido Cruz, a farmer and Rosario Garcia, a housewife. She studied Graciano Paule Elementary School in her primary education and she studied Holy Rosary Academy in Lubao, Pampanga in her secondary education. She entered her studies at the Far Eastern University where she received Major in Political Science and Bachelor of Laws. In 1986, Cruz-Ducut passed the bar examinations.

== Political career ==
In 1992, Cruz-Ducut entered politics when she was a councilor of Lubao until 1995.

In 1995 elections, Cruz-Ducut elected as representative in the second district of Pampanga where she served for three consecutive terms.

In 2004, Cruz-Ducut ran for governor of Pampanga but she lost to Mark Lapid and placed third.

== Later career ==
In 2008, Cruz-Ducut was appointed as chairman of the Energy Regulatory Commission by President Gloria Macapagal Arroyo.

== Personal life ==
Cruz-Ducut is married to Crisanto Ducut, a engineer and has four children.

== Awards and recognitions ==
Cruz-Ducut received the multiple awards and citations, such as; Presidential Citation as the Energetic Legal Aid Lawyer; Distinguished Professor Award of the Harvadian College in San Fernando, Pampanga; Distinguish Kapampangan Awardee in Public Service and Most Outstanding Congresswoman of 1997 and 1998.

== Electoral history ==
Electoral history of Zenaida Cruz-Ducut
Year	Office	Party	Votes received				Result
Year	Office	Party	Total	%	P.	Swing	Result
1995	Representative (Pampanga–2nd)	NPC	67,754	53.07%	1st	—N/a	Won
1998	Representative (Pampanga–2nd)	LAMMP	94,226	56.57%	1st	—N/a	Won
2001	Representative (Pampanga–2nd)	NPC	82,011	—N/a	1st	—N/a	Won
2004	Governor of Pampanga	NPK (Note: Also a member of the Nationalist People's Coalition.)	129,582	19.61%	3rd	—N/a	Lost

== See also ==
- List of female members of the House of Representatives of the Philippines

== Notes ==
House of Representatives of the Philippines
Preceded by Emigdio Lingad	Representative of 2nd District of Pampanga; 1995–2004	Succeeded by Mikey Arroyo
