= Patrick Azanza =

Filipino educator and politician

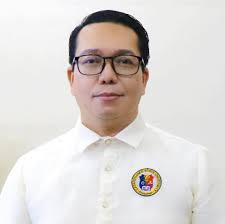

13th Governor of Catanduanes
- Incumbent
- Assumed office June 30, 2025
- Vice Governor: Robert A. Fernandez
- Preceded by: Joseph Cua

President of Catanduanes State University
- In office June 24, 2021 – October 8, 2024
- Preceded by: Minerva I. Morales
- Succeeded by: Roberto B. Barba Jr. (OIC)

Personal details
- Born: Patrick Alain T, Azanza; December 18, 1968 (age 57) Virac, Catanduanes, Philippines
- Party: NUP (2025–present)
- Other political affiliations: Independent (2024–2025)
- Spouse: Jane Rose Azanza
- Education: University of the Philippines Los Baños; University of the Philippines Diliman; Harvard University
- Occupation: Politician, educator

Patrick Alain Tejero Azanza (born December 18, 1968) is a Filipino educator and politician who is currently serving as the 13th Governor of Catanduanes since June 30, 2025. He previously served as President of Catanduanes State University until his automatic resignation.

== Early life and education ==
Patrick Azanza hailed from Virac, Catanduanes. He finished his Bachelor of Arts in Sociology in 1990 at University of the Philippines Los Baños. In 1995, he finished his Master of Arts in Sociology at University of the Philippines Diliman then in 2003, he finished his Doctor of Philosophy in Educational Administration in the same university. He also finished his Juris Doctor Degree at University of the Philippines College of Law in 2008.

In 2003, he finished his Post-Doctoral Leadership Program in Education at Harvard University.

== Political career ==
In October 8, 2024, Azanza filed his Certificate of Candidacy to challenge Vice Gov. Peter C. Cua, brother of then incumbent Gov. Joseph Cua who was term limited. He defeated his rival by a margin of 362 votes and assumed the governor post on June 30, 2025.
