= Governor of Catanduanes =

Local chief executive

- Gobernador ng Lalawigan ng Catanduanes
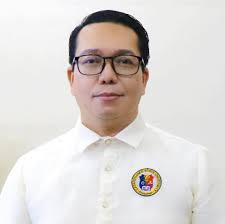
- Incumbent; Patrick Alain Azanza since June 30, 2025
- Style: The Honorable
- Seat: Catanduanes Provincial Capitol, Virac, Catanduanes
- Term length: 3 years, renewable maximum not eligible for re-election immediately after three consecutive terms
- Inaugural holder: Felipe Olesco Usero (de facto, as Lt. Governor of Catanduanes ) Remigio Socito (de jure, as appointed Governor of Province of Catanduanes)
- Formation: September 26, 1945
- Deputy: Vice Governor

The governor of Catanduanes is the local chief executive and head of the Provincial Government of Catanduanes in the Philippines. Along with the governors of Albay, Camarines Norte, Camarines Sur, Masbate, and Sorsogon, the province's chief executive is a member of the Regional Development Council of the Bicol Region.

== List of governors of Catanduanes ==
Governors of Catanduanes

1. THIRD PHILIPPINE REPUBLIC (1945–1981)
No.	Name	Term	Origin	Note(s)
1	Remigio Socito	September 26, 1945 - December 30, 1947	Virac	Last Lieutenant governor of subprovince of Catanduanes under Albay. Appointed first governor.
2	Alfonso Vera Usero	December 30, 1947 - December 30, 1951	Viga	first elected governor.
3	Juan Molina Alberto	December 30, 1951 - December 30, 1959	Virac	Elected twice.
4	Jorge Vera Almojuela	December 30, 1959 - December 30, 1967	Pandan	Elected twice
5	Vicente Molina Alberto	December 30, 1967 - June 30, 1981	Virac	Elected in 3 consecutive terms.

2. FOURTH PHILIPPINE REPUBLIC (1981–1986)
No.	Name	Term	Origin	Note(s)
(5)	Vicente Molina Alberto	June 30, 1981 - March 15, 1986	Virac	Longest serving governor.

3. FIFTH PHILIPPINE REPUBLIC (1986–present)
No.	Image	Name	Term	Origin	Note(s)
6		Leandro I. Verceles Sr.	March 16, 1986 - January 31, 1988	Virac	Former ambassador. Appointed by President Corazon C. Aquino.
6		Leandro I. Verceles Sr.	February 1, 1988 - June 30, 1992	Virac	Elected
7		Rosalie Alberto-Estacio	June 30, 1992 - June 30, 1995	Virac	
8		Severo C. Alcantara	June 30, 1995 - June 30, 1998	Virac	
9		Hector S. Sanchez	June 30, 1998 - June 30, 2001	Virac	
10		Leandro Buenconsejo Verceles Jr.	June 30, 2001 - June 30, 2007	Virac	Elected twice.
11		Joseph Chua Cua	June 30, 2007 - June 30, 2013	San Andres	Elected twice.
12		Araceli B. Wong	June 30, 2013 - June 30, 2016	Pandan	
(11)		Joseph Chua Cua	June 30, 2016 - June 30, 2025	San Andres	Elected in 3 consecutive terms.
13		Patrick Alain T. Azanza	June 30, 2025 -	Virac	
