= Lupong Tagapagpaganap ng Pook =

Overview
- Country: Philippines
- Polity: Autonomous Region in Muslim Mindanao
- Leader: Lupon Chairman
- Appointed by: President of the Philippines

The Lupong Tagapagpaganap ng Pook (LTP; transl. Regional Executive Council) was the executive body for the two former autonomous regions of Western Mindanao and Central Mindanao in the Philippines.

== Chairman ==
Chairman of the Lupong Tagapagpaganap ng Pook
- Tagapangulo ng Lupong Tagapagpaganap ng Pook
- Reports to: President of the Philippines
- Unofficial names: Lupon Chairman

Each of the LTP was headed by the Lupon Chairman which directly reported to the President of the Philippines. Holders of the position were also the chairman of their respective region's Regional Development Councils. The chairman was responsible for the implementation or supervision of the implementation of policies, programs and legislations enacted by the Sangguniang Pampook (Regional Legislative Assembly). The Chairman could approve or veto any legislation proposed by the Sangguniang Pampook. In the case of the latter, the legislature could override a veto by a two-thirds majority vote.

=== List of chairmen ===
==== Western Mindanao (Region IX) ====
- Ulbert Ulama Tugung (December 9, 1979–1984; July 16, 1986 – November 22, 1986)
- Sali Wali
- Noring Tugung
- Elnorita Tugung (November 27, 1986–?)

==== Central Mindanao (Region XII) ====
- Simeon Datumanong (December 9, 1979–1984)
- Amelil Malaguio (1984–1986)
- Zacaria Candao
- Abdulrahman Alam
- Ali Bashir Lucman
