= Leandro Verceles Jr. =

Filipino politician and lawyer

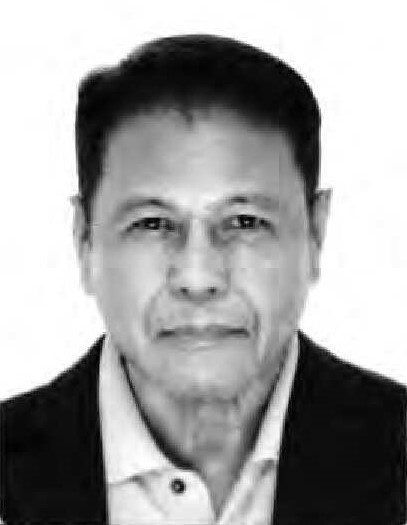
- Verceles certificate of candidacy photo in 2024

10th Governor of Catanduanes
- In office June 30, 2001 – June 30, 2007
- Vice Governor: Cesar Sarmiento (2001–2004); Vincent Villaluna (2004–2007)
- Preceded by: Hector S. Sanchez
- Succeeded by: Joseph Cua

Member of the Philippine House of Representatives from Catanduanes' Lone District
- In office June 30, 1992 – June 30, 2001
- Preceded by: Moises M. Tapia
- Succeeded by: Joseph Santiago

Personal details
- Born: Leandro Buenconsejo Verceles Jr. January 11, 1957 (age 69) Manila, Philippines
- Citizenship: Philippines
- Party: Independent (2007–2022, 2025–present)
- Other political affiliations: Lakas (1991–2007); PFP (2022–2025)
- Spouse: Nathalie Lourdes Africa
- Education: University of the Philippines
- Profession: Lawyer

Leandro "Jun" Buenconsejo Verceles Jr. (born January 11, 1957) is a former congressman and governor of Catanduanes from 1992 to 2001 and 2001 to 2007, respectively. He was also a candidate for Catanduanes's at-large congressional district in 2010, 2013, and 2016. He ran for a senatorial seat in the 2025 Philippine Senate election as an independent candidate, which he lost.

== Early life ==
Verceles was born in Manila on January 11, 1957. In 1980, he gained a degree for Business Administration from the University of the Philippines. In 1987, he gained a law degree from Ateneo de Manila University. He also obtained a master's degree in public administration from the University of the Philippines and studied at Harvard. From 1987 to 1991, he worked at the Angara Abello Concepcion Regala & Cruz Law Offices.

== Political career ==
In 1992, he was elected to the lone district of Catanduanes. During his term, he was an advocate for technology. After his term in congress, he was elected in the 2001 Philippine gubernatorial elections as the Governor of Catanduanes. He served another term after he was elected again in the 2004 Philippine gubernatorial elections.

=== Post-governor ===
He ran for congressman in 2010, 2013, and 2016, but lost in all three. In the 2016 Philippine House of Representatives elections, he ran independently and gained last place with 6,228 votes. Just after the 2022 Philippine general election, he was elected as the president of the political party Partido Federal ng Pilipinas in an assembly in Pasig. After, he asked support from other national officers. In 2025, he filed his certificate of candidacy for senator in the 2025 Philippine Senate election under Partido Federal ng Pilipinas, the party of Marcos, but changed to an independent candidate.

== Controversy ==
In 2004, he was accused of purchasing fertilizers irregularly by the Sandiganbayan. He was charged with a violation of Republic Act 3019, Anti-Graft and Corrupt Practices Act. He was accused with Provincial Treasurer Julieta Tasarra, Provincial Department Head Rodolfo Maliñana, Administrative Officer IV Roger Pitajen, and Assistant Provincial Assessor Abelardo Abundo Jr. After 14 years, he pled guilty to a lesser fine.
