= Bob Tugung =

Filipino teacher, newsman, and politician

Ulbert Ulama Tugung

Chair of the Lupong Tagapagpaganap ng Pook of Western Mindanao (Region IX)
- In office December 1979 – 1984
- President: Ferdinand Marcos
- Preceded by: Romulo Espaldon (as Regional Commissioner)
- In office July 16, 1986 – November 22, 1986
- President: Corazon Aquino
- Succeeded by: Elnorita Tugung

Personal details
- Born: November 10, 1939 Bongao, Sulu, Philippine Commonwealth
- Died: November 22, 1986 (aged 47) Manila, Philippines
- Spouse: Elnorita Tugung

Ulbert Ulama “Bob” Tugung (November 10, 1939 – November 22, 1986) was a Filipino teacher, newsman, and politician. He served as Chairman of the Lupong Tagapagpaganap ng Pook (LTP) of Autonomous Region IX in Mindanao from 1979 until his assassination in 1986.

== Early life and education ==
Ulama was born on November 10, 1939, in Bongao, Sulu (now Tawi-Tawi) to Hadji Pangalampas Tugung and Hadja Naradja.

He graduated valedictorian at Tubig-Indanan Elementary School (now Panglima Ibrahim Elementary School) in Simunul then went to Notre Dame of Bongao for high school. He obtained his law degree from the Zamboanga A.E. Colleges (now Universidad de Zamboanga) in Zamboanga City.

Fresh out of college, he ran for mayor at the age of 23 in the 1961 local elections in Bongao but did not succeed. The following year, he married Elnorita Pamaran of Lamitan, Basilan. They both became school teachers at Claret College of Isabela. From 1968 to 1973, he was publisher of the Basilan Newsweek.

== Career ==
In 1970, Ulama was elected municipal councilor of Basilan when he ran as the lone opposition candidate against the slate of former mayor Leroy Brown.

At the height of the Muslim secessionist movement led by the Moro National Liberation Front (MNLF) in the mid-1970s, Basilan became the scene of some of the bloodiest fighting between rebels and government forces. Tugung actively negotiated the surrender of thousands of rebels and saw to their subsequent rehabilitation.

When the city of Basilan was converted into a province in 1974, Tugung was appointed provincial board member, and concurrently deputy governor to the military governor and OIC Mayor of Isabela.

In 1976, he was appointed Executive Assistant of the Mindanao Executive Development Academy and subsequently promoted as Director of the Local Government Monitoring Office of the newly organized Office of the Regional Commissioner (ORC) headed by Rear Admiral Romulo Espaldon. In January 1977, he became the ORC's Executive Director.

In May 1979, Tugung was elected Regional Assemblyman of the Regional Autonomous Government's legislative assembly. He was subsequently appointed Chairman of the LTP (Regional Executive Council) of Region IX in December 1979 and implemented massive infrastructure and social projects in the Sulu Archipelago and Zamboanga Peninsula.

In 1984, he had a falling out with the Marcos administration during the 1984 elections for the Batasang Pambansa, for which he was consequently removed as LTP chairman, although he remained a Regional Assemblyman representing Basilan. He founded the Basilan United Opposition (BUO) and successfully campaigned in the province for Corazon C. Aquino in the 1986 snap election. He was reappointed as LTP Chairman on July 16, 1986.

== Death ==
In the evening of November 22, 1986, Tugung and his aide, Anijay Jumaani, were fatally shot as they were emerging from Hotel Aurelio in Manila after a long day of conferences with other Mindanao leaders. He was interred in a Muslim cemetery in Tabuk, Isabela, Basilan.

His widow, Elnorita, was appointed by President Aquino to succeed him as LTP chairman on November 27, 1986. In 1992, she was elected as Member of the House of Representatives for the Lone District of Basilan.

== Memorial ==
For his contributions in Mindanao, Tugung Street in Isabela, Basilan and Tugung Avenue in Zamboanga City were named after him.

In 1988, the Bob Tugung Peace and Development Foundation was founded with a focus on education by granting scholarship to deserving students and other education-related activities.
