= Joseph Cua =

Filipino politician

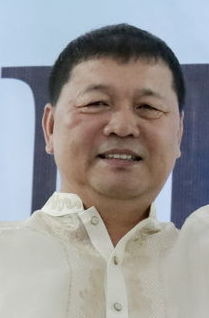

11th Governor of Catanduanes
- In office June 30, 2016 – June 30, 2025
- Vice Governor: Peter Cua (2022–2025); Shirley Abundo (2016–2022)
- Preceded by: Araceli Wong
- Succeeded by: Patrick Azanza
- In office June 30, 2007 – June 30, 2013
- Vice Governor: Jose Teves Jr. (2010–2013); Alfred Aquino (2007–2010)
- Preceded by: Leandro Verceles Jr.
- Succeeded by: Araceli Wong

Personal details
- Born: October 16, 1962 (age 63) Calolbon, Catanduanes, Philippines
- Party: Lakas–CMD (2007–2010; 2024–present)
- Other party: NPC (2021–2024); UNA (2016–2021); Liberal (2010–2016); Independent (2006–2007); KAMPI (2004–2006)

Joseph "Boboy" Chua Cua (born October 16, 1962) is a Filipino politician from the province of Catanduanes, Philippines who served as Governor of Catanduanes. He was first elected as Governor of the province in 2007 and he was re-elected in the 2010, 2016, and 2019 elections.

In 2019, Cua was suspended by the Office of the Ombudsman for Luzon. This was due to his "abuse of authority" and "grave misconduct in public service" during his term as governor. This was further implemented by the Department of the Interior and Local Government (DILG). After the suspension, DILG Bicol director Anthony Nuyda directed Vice Governor Shirley Abundo to assume office as acting governor.

On April 30, 2020, he reassumes his post again as governor after his 365-day suspension period from May 1, 2019, until April 29, 2020. According to Nuyda, this was in accordance to article 13 of the Civil Code of the Philippines.

== As governor ==
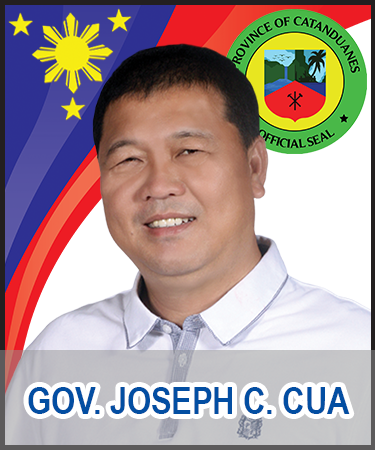
Portrait of Cua as governor of Catanduanes

After his suspension as governor in 2020, during his State of the Province Address, Cua admits that the province lacks the needed infrastracture. Cua also praised his Assistance to Individuals in Crisis Situations (AICS) program that distributed 18 million Philippine pesos to 3,000 constituents and was able to provide help for the citizens of the province under the TUPAD (Tulong Panghanap-Buhay sa Disadvantaged/Displaced Workers) that distributed P9.7 million Php to 1,887 beneficiaries. Most of them worked for the typhoon rehab, street cleaning, and abaca rehab programs in the province.

In 2024, Cua's administration cooperated with the Bicol Regional Plan Advocacy Committee (RPAC) of NEDA under the Bicol Regional Development Plan (RDP) 2023-2028. According to Cua, this partnership will improve air and maritime ports and boost the energy sector of Catanduanes.

== Controversies ==
=== Illegal drug trade accusation ===
In December 2016, the Department of Justice (DOJ) Secretary Vitaliano Aguirre II sent two prosecutors to conduct an investigation in an illegal drug laboratory in Virac, Catanduanes and for the alleged involvement of Cua, Virac Mayor Samuel Laynes and former National Bureau of Investigation regional director Eric Isidoro. In May 2, 2017, Cua was charged with murder before the DOJ by Edralyn Pangilinan, the live-in partner of the murdered news publisher of Catanduanes News Now, Larry Que. According to the 27-page complaint presented to the DOJ, the newspaper was said to "uncover" a mega-sized drug laboratory in Virac. In July 2017, officials from the Dangerous Drugs Board have accused him of being involved in the illegal drug trade.

However, the Philippine Ombudsman dropped the cases against him due to lack of evidences in 2018.

=== Suspension as Governor ===
Four months before the 2019 Philippine general election, the Department of the Interior and Local Government has suspended re-electionist Catanduanes Governor Joseph Cua for abuse of authority.

Cua's suspension for six months stemmed from an administrative complaint filed by a certain Rey Mendez for allegedly allowing a construction firm owned by Mayor Eulogio Rodriguez of Bato town to use a lot owned by the provincial government free of charge even without authorization from the Sangguniang Panlalawigan.

In January 2020, Cua proclaimed himself as governor and said that he served his suspension completely. His self-reinstatement was blocked by DILG Secretary Eduardo Año. According to the department, they did not recognize his assumption in office and ordered him to vacate the post-pending resolution from the Office of the Ombudsman.

He reassumes his post again as governor on April 30, 2020, after his 365-day suspension. This was stated by Atty. Anthony Nuyda, the regional director of DILG, citing article 13 of the Civil Code of the Philippines.

=== 2025 midterm elections ===
In July 2025, the Commission on Elections (COMELEC) disqualified Cua as a candidate for the mayorship of Virac due to his unresolved issues in his citizenship. The decision was released after Cua lost to Sinforoso Sarmiento for the mayoral race.
