= Elnorita Tugung =

Filipino politician (died 2020)

Chair of the Lupong Tagapagpaganap ng Pook of Western Mindanao (Region IX)
- In office 1986–?
- President: Corazon Aquino
- Preceded by: Ulbert Ulama Tugung

Member of the Philippine House of Representatives from Basilan's at-large congressional district
- In office June 30, 1992 – June 30, 1995
- Preceded by: Alvin G. Dans
- Succeeded by: Candu I. Muarip

Personal details
- Born: Elnorita Pamaran; September 20, 1939
- Died: October 30, 2020 (aged 81)
- Spouse: Ulbert Ulama Tugung

Elnorita Pamaran Tugung (September 20, 1939 – December 8, 2019) was a Filipino politician who served as Lupon Chairman of the nominal autonomous region of Western Mindanao (Region IX). She was also a member of the House of Representatives of the Philippines for Basilan's lone district from 1992 to 1995.

She was appointed chairman of the region in 1986 by President Corazon Aquino, after her predecessor and husband Ulbert Ulama Tugung was assassinated.

Tugung died in 2019 aged 80.
