= 1998 Philippine House of Representatives elections =

18th Philippine House of Representatives elections

- May 11, 1998

All 257 seats in the House of Representatives (including 38 underhang seats) 129 seats needed for a majority
- Congressional district elections
- All 206 seats from congressional districts
| Party | Vote % | Seats | +/– |
|---|---|---|---|
| Lakas | 49.01 | 111 | +11 |
| LAMMP | 26.68 | 55 | +55 |
| Liberal | 7.25 | 15 | +10 |
| NPC | 4.08 | 9 | −13 |
| Reporma | 3.95 | 4 | +4 |
| PROMDI | 2.40 | 4 | +4 |
| Aksyon | 0.44 | 1 | +1 |
| Others | 1.61 | 5 | +5 |
| Independent | 3.42 | 2 | −5 |
This lists parties that won seats. See the complete results below.
- Party-list election
- All 51 seats under the party-list system
| Party | Vote % | Seats | +/– |
|---|---|---|---|
| APEC | 5.50 | 2 | +2 |
| ABA | 3.51 | 1 | +1 |
| Alagad | 3.41 | 1 | +1 |
| VFP | 3.33 | 1 | +1 |
| PROMDI | 2.79 | 1 | +1 |
| AKO BAHAY | 2.61 | 1 | +1 |
| SCFO | 2.60 | 1 | +1 |
| Abanse! Pinay | 2.57 | 1 | +1 |
| Akbayan | 2.54 | 1 | +1 |
| Butil | 2.36 | 1 | +1 |
| Sanlakas | 2.13 | 1 | +1 |
| Coop-NATCCO | 2.07 | 1 | +1 |
| COCOFED | 2.04 | 1 | +1 |
This lists parties that won seats. See the complete results below.
| Speaker before | Speaker after |
|---|---|
| Jose de Venecia Jr. Lakas | Manny Villar; LAMMP |

Elections for the House of Representatives of the Philippines were held on May 11, 1998. Held on the same day as the presidential election, the party of the incumbent president, Fidel V. Ramos' Lakas–NUCD–UMDP (Lakas), won majority of the seats in the House of Representatives. For the first time since the People Power Revolution, a party won majority of the seats in the House; Lakas had a seat over the majority. This is also the first Philippine elections that included the party-list system.

However, with Joseph Estrada of the opposition Laban ng Makabayang Masang Pilipino (LAMMP; an electoral alliance between the Partido ng Masang Pilipino (PMP), the NPC and the Laban ng Demokratikong Pilipino (LDP)) winning the presidential election, the majority of the elected Lakas congressmen switched sides to LAMMP. This led to Manuel Villar, Jr. (formerly of Lakas but became a LAMMP member prior to the election) on being elected as the Speaker of the House.

The elected representatives served in the 11th Congress from 1998 to 2001.

== Electoral system ==
The House of Representatives shall have not more than 250 members, unless otherwise fixed by law, of which 20% shall be elected via the party-list system, while the rest are elected via congressional districts. This is the first time that there shall be a party-list election, after the passage of the Party-List System Act.

In this election, there are 206 seats voted via first-past-the-post in single-member districts. Each province, and a city with a population of 250,000, is guaranteed a seat, with more populous provinces and cities divided into two or more districts.

Congress has the power of redistricting three years after each census.

As there are 206 congressional districts, there shall be 51 seats available under the party-list system. According to the Party-List System Act, party is initially guaranteed a seat for every 2% of the vote, for up to three maximum seats.

== Redistricting ==
Reapportioning (redistricting) the number of seats is either via national reapportionment three years after the release of every census, or via piecemeal redistricting for every province or city. National reapportionment has not happened since the 1987 constitution took effect, and aside from piecemeal redistricting, the apportionment was based on the ordinance from the constitution, which was in turn based from the 1980 census.

Seven new districts were created, with one from Antipolo, two from the newly created province of Compostela Valley, a new district from the division of Kalinga-Apayao, which became Apayao and Kalinga, and two new districts from the division of Las Piñas–Muntinlupa district.

=== Changes from the outgoing Congress ===
- Division of Kalinga-Apayao and its at-large district to Apayao and Kalinga provinces
  - Apayao becomes a province and its own at-large district.
  - Kalinga becomes a province and its own at-large district.
  - Enacted into law as Republic Act No. 7878.
  - Approved in a plebiscite on May 8, 1995.
- Division of Las Piñas–Muntinlupa's at-large district to two districts
  - Muntinlupa attains cityhood and becomes its own at-large district.
  - Las Piñas becomes its own at-large district.
  - Enacted into law as Republic Act No. 7928.
  - Approved in a plebiscite on May 8, 1995.

== Retiring and term-limited incumbents ==
This is the first election under the 1987 constitution where the three-term limit was in use. Members who had been elected consecutively since 1987 (1987, 1992, 1995_ are term-limited.

=== Retiring incumbents ===
1. Abra: Jeremias Zapata (Lakas)
2. Agusan del Sur: Ceferino Paredes Jr. (Lakas), ran for governor of Agusan del Sur
3. Basilan: Candu Muarip (Lakas), ran for governor of Basilan
4. Cagayan de Oro: Erasmo Damasing (PDP–Laban)
5. Camarines Norte: Emmanuel Pimentel (NPC), ran for governor of Camarines Norte
6. Cavite–3rd: Telesforo Unas (Lakas)
7. Cebu–3rd: John Henry Osmeña (NPC), ran for senator
8. Cebu–6th: Nerissa Soon-Ruiz (Lakas)
9. Davao City–1st: Prospero Nograles (Lakas), ran for mayor of Davao City
10. Davao del Sur–2nd: Benjamin Bautista Sr. (Lakas)
11. Laguna–1st: Nereo Joaquin (LAMMP)
12. Misamis Occidental–2nd: Herminia Ramiro (Lakas)
13. Occidental Mindoro: Jose Villarosa (Lakas)
14. Pasay: Jovito Claudio (Lakas), ran for mayor of Pasay

=== Term-limited incumbents ===
1. Agusan del Norte–1st: Charito Plaza (Liberal), ran for senator
2. Albay–1st: Edcel Lagman (LAMMP), ran for senator
3. Albay–2nd: Carlos R. Imperial (Lakas)
4. Antique: Exequiel Javier (Lakas), ran for governor of Antique
5. Bacolod: Romeo Guanzon (Lakas)
6. Bataan–1st: Felicito Payumo (Liberal)
7. Batangas–2nd: Hernando Perez (Lakas), ran for senator
8. Batangas–3rd: Milagros Trinidad (Lakas)
9. Bohol–1st: Venice Agana (Lakas)
10. Bohol–3rd: Isidro Zarraga (Lakas)
11. Bukidnon–1st: Socorro Acosta (Liberal)
12. Bukidnon–3rd: Jose Maria Zubiri Jr. (Lakas)
13. Camarines Sur–1st: Rolando Andaya (Lakas), ran for senator
14. Camarines Sur–4th: Ciriaco Alfelor (Lakas), ran for governor of Camarines Sur
15. Camiguin: Pedro Romualdo (Lakas), ran for governor of Camiguin
16. Cavite–2nd: Renato Dragon (LAMMP), ran for governor of Cavite
17. Cebu–2nd: Crisologo Abines (PROMDI)
18. Cebu–4th: Celestino Martinez Jr. (PROMDI)
19. Cebu–5th: Ramon Durano III (Lakas)
20. Cebu City–1st: Raul del Mar (PROMDI)
21. Cebu City–2nd: Antonio Cuenco (PROMDI)
22. Cotabato–2nd: Gregorio Andolana (Lakas), ran for governor of Cotabato
23. Davao del Norte–2nd: Baltazar Sator (Lakas)
24. Davao del Norte–3rd: Rodolfo del Rosario (Lakas), district redistricted into Davao del Norte–2nd
25. Davao Oriental–2nd: Thelma Almario (Lakas)
26. Eastern Samar: Jose Ramirez (Lakas), ran for governor of Eastern Samar
27. Ilocos Norte–1st: Roque Ablan Jr. (Lakas), ran for governor of Ilocos Norte
28. Ilocos Sur–2nd: Eric Singson (Lakas), ran for governor of Ilocos Sur
29. Iloilo–1st: Oscar Garin (Lakas)
30. Iloilo–2nd: Alberto Lopez (Lakas)
31. Iloilo–3rd: Licurgo Tirador (Lakas)
32. Iloilo–5th: Niel Tupas Sr. (Lakas)
33. Isabela–1st: Rodolfo Albano Jr. (Lakas)
34. Isabela–3rd: Santiago Respicio (Lakas)
35. Isabela–4th: Antonio Abaya (NPC)
36. La Union–1st: Victor Ortega (Lakas)
37. La Union–2nd: Jose Aspiras (LAMMP), ran for governor of La Union
38. Laguna–3rd: Florante Aquino (Lakas), ran for governor of Laguna
39. Lanao del Norte–1st: Mariano Badelles (Lakas)
40. Leyte–3rd: Alberto Veloso (Lakas), ran for governor of Leyte
41. Leyte–4th: Carmelo Locsin (Lakas)
42. Leyte–5th: Eriberto Loreto (Lakas)
43. Malabon–Navotas: Tessie Aquino-Oreta (LAMMP), ran for senator
44. Manila–1st: Martin Isidro (NPC), ran for vice mayor of Manila
45. Manila–2nd: Jaime Lopez (Lakas), ran for mayor of Manila
46. Manila–3rd: Leonardo Fugoso (Liberal)
47. Manila–4th: Ramon Bagatsing Jr. (LAMMP), ran for senator
48. Manila–5th: Amado Bagatsing (LAMMP), ran for mayor of Manila
49. Marinduque: Carmencita Reyes (Lakas), ran for governor of Marinduque
50. Masbate–2nd: Luz Cleta Bakunawa (LAMMP), ran for governor of Masbate
51. Misamis Oriental–2nd: Victorico Chaves (Lakas)
52. Mountain Province: Victor Dominguez (Lakas)
53. Negros Occidental–3rd: Jose Carlos Lacson (Lakas)
54. Negros Occidental–4th: Edward Matti (NPC)
55. Negros Occidental–5th: Mariano Yulo (Lakas), ran for governor of Negros Occidental
56. Negros Oriental–1st: Jerome Paras (Lakas), ran for governor of Negros Oriental
57. Negros Oriental–2nd: Miguel Romero (Lakas)
58. Negros Oriental–3rd: Margarito Teves (Lakas)
59. Northern Samar–1st: Raul Daza (Liberal), ran for senator
60. Oriental Mindoro–2nd: Jesus Punzalan (Lakas), ran for governor of Oriental Mindoro
61. Pampanga–1st: Carmelo Lazatin Sr. (Lakas), ran for mayor of Angeles City
62. Pampanga–4th: Emigdio Bondoc (Lakas)
63. Pangasinan–4th: Jose de Venecia Jr. (Lakas), ran for president of the Philippines
64. Pasig: Rufino Javier (NPC)
65. Quezon–1st: Wilfrido Enverga (LAMMP), ran for governor of Quezon
66. Quirino: Junie Cua (Lakas)
67. Rizal–2nd: Emigdio Tanjuatco Jr. (Lakas)
68. San Juan: Ronaldo Zamora (LAMMP)
69. Sarangani: James Chiongbian (Lakas)
70. Siquijor: Orlando Fua (Lakas)
71. Sorsogon–1st: Salvador Escudero (Lakas)
72. Sorsogon–2nd: Bonifacio Gillego (Lakas)
73. Surigao del Sur–1st: Mario Ty (Lakas)
74. Taguig–Pateros: Dante Tiñga (Lakas), ran for mayor of Taguig
75. Tarlac–1st: Peping Cojuangco (Kampi)
76. Tarlac–2nd: Jose Yap (Lakas), ran for governor of Tarlac
77. Tarlac–3rd: Herminio Aquino (Liberal), ran for vice governor of Tarlac
78. Valenzuela: Antonio Serapio (NPC), ran for mayor of Valenzuela
79. Zamboanga City: Maria Clara Lobregat (LAMMP), ran for mayor of Zamboanga City
80. Zamboanga del Norte–3rd: Angel Carloto (Lakas)
81. Zamboanga del Sur–2nd: Antonio Cerilles (NPC)

== Vacancies ==
1. Bulacan–1st: Teodulo Natividad (Lakas) died on January 9, 1997.
2. Guimaras: Catalino Nava (Lakas) died on December 3, 1995.
3. Laguna–4th: Magdaleno Palacol Sr. (Lakas) died on August 21, 1997.
4. Makati–2nd: Butz Aquino (LDP) received the most number of votes in the 1995 election, but was disqualified by the Commission on Elections on June 2, 1995.

== Results ==
=== District elections ===
| Party | Votes | % | +/– | Seats | +/– |
|---|---|---|---|---|---|
| Lakas–NUCD–UMDP | 11,981,024 | 49.01 | +8.35 | 111 | +11 |
| Laban ng Makabayang Masang Pilipino | 6,520,744 | 26.68 | New | 55 | New |
| Liberal Party | 1,773,124 | 7.25 | +5.39 | 15 | +10 |
| Nationalist People's Coalition | 998,239 | 4.08 | −8.11 | 9 | −13 |
| Partido para sa Demokratikong Reporma | 966,653 | 3.95 | New | 4 | New |
| Probinsya Muna Development Initiative | 586,954 | 2.40 | New | 4 | New |
| PDP–Laban | 134,331 | 0.55 | −0.13 | 0 | −1 |
| Aksyon Demokratiko | 106,843 | 0.44 | New | 1 | New |
| Kabalikat ng Malayang Pilipino | 47,273 | 0.19 | New | 0 | New |
| Ompia Party | 46,462 | 0.19 | New | 1 | New |
| People's Reform Party | 38,640 | 0.16 | −0.73 | 0 | 0 |
| Kilusang Bagong Lipunan | 35,522 | 0.15 | New | 0 | 0 |
| Partido Demokratiko Sosyalista ng Pilipinas | 8,850 | 0.04 | −0.00 | 0 | 0 |
| Lapiang Manggagawa | 8,792 | 0.04 | −0.50 | 0 | 0 |
| Nacionalista Party | 4,412 | 0.02 | −0.78 | 0 | −1 |
| Partido ng Masang Pilipino | 2,010 | 0.01 | −0.52 | 0 | −1 |
| Kilusan para sa Pambansang Pagpapabago | 1,310 | 0.01 | New | 0 | New |
| Unaffiliated | 348,281 | 1.42 | New | 4 | New |
| Independent | 834,934 | 3.42 | −3.03 | 2 | −5 |
| Party-list seats (Note: Only 14 were seated in the party-list election.) | | | | 51 | +51 |
| Total | 24,444,398 | 100.00 | – | 257 | +37 |
| Valid votes | 24,444,398 | 83.47 | | | |
| Invalid/blank votes | 4,841,377 | 16.53 | | | |
| Total votes | 29,285,775 | 100.00 | | | |
| Registered voters/turnout | 33,873,665 | 86.46 | | | |
Source: Nohlen, Grotz and Hartmann and Teehankee

Vote share
| Lakas | 49.01% |
| LAMMP | 26.68% |
| Liberal | 7.25% |
| NPC | 4.08% |
| Reporma | 3.95% |
| PROMDI | 2.40% |
| Others | 4.65% |

District seats
| Lakas | 53.88% |
| LAMMP | 26.70% |
| Liberal | 7.28% |
| NPC | 4.37% |
| Reporma | 1.94% |
| PROMDI | 1.94% |
| Others | 3.89% |

==== Summary by district ====
| Congressional district | Incumbent | Incumbent's party | Winner | Winner's party |
|---|---|---|---|---|
| Abra | Jeremias Zapata | Lakas | Vicente Ysidro Valera | Lakas |
| Agusan del Norte–1st | Charito Plaza | Liberal | Leovigildo Banaag | LAMMP |
| Agusan del Norte–2nd | Eduardo Rama Sr. | Lakas | Roan Libarios | LAMMP |
| Agusan del Sur | Ceferino Paredes Jr. | Lakas | Alex Bascug | LAMMP |
| Aklan | Allen Quimpo | LAMMP | Allen Quimpo | LAMMP |
| Albay–1st | Edcel Lagman | LAMMP | Krisel Lagman | LAMMP |
| Albay–2nd | Carlos R. Imperial | Lakas | Norma Imperial | Lakas |
| Albay–3rd | Romeo Salalima | Lakas | Joey Salceda | LAMMP |
| Antipolo | New district | | Victor Sumulong | Lakas |
| Antique | Exequiel Javier | Lakas | Jovito Plameras Jr. | Lakas |
| Apayao | New district | | Elias Bulut | Lakas |
| Aurora | Bella Angara | LAMMP | Bella Angara | LAMMP |
| Bacolod | Romeo Guanzon | Lakas | Juan Orola Jr. | LAMMP |
| Baguio | Bernardo Vergara | Lakas | Bernardo Vergara | Lakas |
| Basilan | Candu Muarip | Lakas | Abdulgani Salapuddin | Lakas |
| Bataan–1st | Felicito Payumo | Liberal | Antonino Roman | Lakas |
| Bataan–2nd | Tet Garcia | Lakas | Tet Garcia | Lakas |
| Batanes | Florencio Abad | Liberal | Florencio Abad | Liberal |
| Batangas–1st | Eduardo Ermita | Lakas | Eduardo Ermita | Lakas |
| Batangas–2nd | Hernando Perez | Lakas | Edgar Mendoza | Lakas |
| Batangas–3rd | Milagros Trinidad | Lakas | Jose Laurel IV | Lakas |
| Batangas–4th | Ralph Recto | Lakas | Ralph Recto | Lakas |
| Benguet | Ronald Cosalan | Lakas | Ronald Cosalan | Lakas |
| Biliran | Gerardo Espina Sr. | Lakas | Gerardo Espina Sr. | Lakas |
| Bohol–1st | Venice Agana | Lakas | Ernesto Herrera | LAMMP |
| Bohol–2nd | Erico Aumentado | Lakas | Erico Aumentado | Lakas |
| Bohol–3rd | Isidro Zarraga | Lakas | Eladio Jala | LAMMP |
| Bukidnon–1st | Socorro Acosta | Liberal | Nereus Acosta | Liberal |
| Bukidnon–2nd | Reginaldo Tilanduca | Lakas | Reginaldo Tilanduca | Lakas |
| Bukidnon–3rd | Jose Maria Zubiri Jr. | Lakas | Juan Miguel Zubiri | Lakas |
| Bulacan–1st | Vacant | | Wilhelmino Sy-Alvarado | Lakas |
| Bulacan–2nd | Pedro Pancho | Lakas | Pedro Pancho | Lakas |
| Bulacan–3rd | Ricardo Silverio | Lakas | Ricardo Silverio | Lakas |
| Bulacan–4th | Angelito Sarmiento | Lakas | Angelito Sarmiento | Lakas |
| Cagayan–1st | Patricio Antonio | Reporma | Jack Enrile | Independent |
| Cagayan–2nd | Edgar Lara | NPC | Edgar Lara | NPC |
| Cagayan–3rd | Manuel Mamba | Lakas | Rodolfo Aguinaldo | Lakas |
| Cagayan de Oro | Erasmo Damasing | PDP–Laban | Constantino Jaraula | LAMMP |
| Caloocan–1st | Bobby Guanzon | Lakas | Recom Echiverri | Lakas |
| Caloocan–2nd | Luis Asistio | LAMMP | Luis Asistio | LAMMP |
| Camarines Norte | Emmanuel Pimentel | NPC | Roy Padilla Jr. | LAMMP |
| Camarines Sur–1st | Rolando Andaya | Lakas | Rolando Andaya Jr. | Lakas |
| Camarines Sur–2nd | Leopoldo San Buenaventura | Lakas | Jaime Jacob | Aksyon |
| Camarines Sur–3rd | Arnulfo Fuentebella | NPC | Arnulfo Fuentebella | NPC |
| Camarines Sur–4th | Ciriaco Alfelor | Lakas | Salvio Fortuno | LAMMP |
| Camiguin | Pedro Romualdo | Lakas | Jurdin Jesus Romualdo | Lakas |
| Capiz–1st | Mar Roxas | Liberal | Mar Roxas | Liberal |
| Capiz–2nd | Vicente Andaya Jr. | Lakas | Vicente Andaya Jr. | Lakas |
| Catanduanes | Leandro Verceles Jr. | Lakas | Leandro Verceles Jr. | Lakas |
| Cavite–1st | Plaridel Abaya | NPC | Plaridel Abaya | NPC |
| Cavite–2nd | Renato Dragon | LAMMP | Ayong Maliksi | LAMMP |
| Cavite–3rd | Telesforo Unas | Lakas | Napoleon Beratio | LAMMP |
| Cebu–1st | Eduardo Gullas | PROMDI | Eduardo Gullas | PROMDI |
| Cebu–2nd | Crisologo Abines | PROMDI | Simeon Kintanar | Lakas |
| Cebu–3rd | John Henry Osmeña | NPC | Antonio Yapha | LAMMP |
| Cebu–4th | Celestino Martinez Jr. | PROMDI | Clavel Martinez | PROMDI |
| Cebu–5th | Ramon Durano III | Lakas | Ace Durano | Lakas |
| Cebu–6th | Nerissa Soon-Ruiz | Lakas | Efren Herrera | Lakas |
| Cebu City–1st | Raul del Mar | PROMDI | Raoul del Mar | PROMDI |
| Cebu City–2nd | Antonio Cuenco | PROMDI | Nancy Cuenco | PROMDI |
| Compostela Valley–1st | New district | | Rogelio Sarmiento | Lakas |
| Compostela Valley–2nd | New district | | Prospero Amatong | Lakas |
| Cotabato–1st | Anthony Dequiña | Lakas | Anthony Dequiña | Lakas |
| Cotabato–2nd | Gregorio Andolana | Lakas | Gregorio Ipong | LAMMP |
| Davao City–1st | Prospero Nograles | Lakas | Rodrigo Duterte | LAMMP |
| Davao City–2nd | Manuel Garcia | Lakas | Manuel Garcia | Lakas |
| Davao City–3rd | Elias Lopez | LAMMP | Elias Lopez | LAMMP |
| Davao del Norte–1st | Rogelio Sarmiento | Lakas | Pantaleon Alvarez | Reporma |
| Davao del Norte–2nd | Baltazar Sator | Lakas | Antonio Floirendo Jr. | Lakas |
| Davao del Sur–1st | Alejandro Almendras Jr. | Lakas | Douglas Cagas | Reporma |
| Davao del Sur–2nd | Benjamin Bautista Sr. | Lakas | Franklin Bautista | Lakas |
| Davao Oriental–1st | Maria Elena Palma-Gil | Lakas | Maria Elena Palma-Gil | Lakas |
| Davao Oriental–2nd | Thelma Almario | Lakas | Joel Mayo Almario | Lakas |
| Eastern Samar | Jose Ramirez | Lakas | Marcelino Libanan | LAMMP |
| Guimaras | Vacant | | Emily Lopez | Lakas |
| Ifugao | Benjamin Cappleman | LAMMP | Benjamin Cappleman | LAMMP |
| Ilocos Norte–1st | Roque Ablan Jr. | Lakas | Rodolfo Fariñas | Independent |
| Ilocos Norte–2nd | Simeon Valdez | Lakas | Imee Marcos | KBL |
| Ilocos Sur–1st | Mariano Tajon | Lakas | Salacnib Baterina | LAMMP |
| Ilocos Sur–2nd | Eric Singson | Lakas | Grace Singson | Lakas |
| Iloilo–1st | Oscar Garin | Lakas | Nimfa Garin | Lakas |
| Iloilo–2nd | Alberto Lopez | Lakas | Augusto Syjuco Jr. | Lakas |
| Iloilo–3rd | Licurgo Tirador | Lakas | Manuel Parcon | Lakas |
| Iloilo–4th | Narciso Monfort | Lakas | Narciso Monfort | Lakas |
| Iloilo–5th | Niel Tupas Sr. | Lakas | Rolex Suplico | LAMMP |
| Iloilo City | Raul M. Gonzalez | Lakas | Raul M. Gonzalez | Lakas |
| Isabela–1st | Rodolfo Albano Jr. | Lakas | Rodolfo Albano III | Lakas |
| Isabela–2nd | Faustino Dy Jr. | Lakas | Faustino Dy Jr. | Lakas |
| Isabela–3rd | Santiago Respicio | Lakas | Ramon Reyes | Lakas |
| Isabela–4th | Antonio Abaya | NPC | Heherson Alvarez | Lakas |
| Kalinga | New district | | Lawrence Wacnang | Lakas |
| La Union–1st | Victor Ortega | Lakas | Manuel Ortega | Lakas |
| La Union–2nd | Jose Aspiras | LAMMP | Tomas Dumpit | LAMMP |
| Laguna–1st | Nereo Joaquin | LAMMP | Uliran Joaquin | LAMMP |
| Laguna–2nd | Jun Chipeco | Lakas | Jun Chipeco | Lakas |
| Laguna–3rd | Florante Aquino | Lakas | Danton Bueser | Liberal |
| Laguna–4th | Vacant | | Rodolfo San Luis | LAMMP |
| Lanao del Norte–1st | Mariano Badelles | Lakas | Alipio Cirilo Badelles | LAMMP |
| Lanao del Norte–2nd | Abdullah Mangotara | Lakas | Abdullah Mangotara | Lakas |
| Lanao del Sur–1st | Mamintal Adiong Sr. | Lakas | Mamintal Adiong Sr. | Lakas |
| Lanao del Sur–2nd | Pangalian Balindong | Lakas | Benasing Macarambon Jr. | Ompia |
| Las Piñas | New district | | Manny Villar | Lakas |
| Leyte–1st | Imelda Marcos | KBL | Alfred Romualdez | LAMMP |
| Leyte–2nd | Sergio Apostol | Lakas | Sergio Apostol | Lakas |
| Leyte–3rd | Alberto Veloso | Lakas | Eduardo Veloso | Liberal |
| Leyte–4th | Carmelo Locsin | Lakas | Maria Victoria Locsin | Lakas |
| Leyte–5th | Eriberto Loreto | Lakas | Nene Go | Lakas |
| Maguindanao–1st | Didagen Dilangalen | LAMMP | Didagen Dilangalen | LAMMP |
| Maguindanao–2nd | Simeon Datumanong | Lakas | Simeon Datumanong | Lakas |
| Makati–1st | Joker Arroyo | LAMMP | Joker Arroyo | LAMMP |
| Makati–2nd | Vacant | | Butz Aquino | LAMMP |
| Malabon–Navotas | Tessie Aquino-Oreta | LAMMP | Ricky Sandoval | Lakas |
| Mandaluyong | Neptali Gonzales II | Lakas | Neptali Gonzales II | Lakas |
| Manila–1st | Martin Isidro | NPC | Ernesto Nieva | LAMMP |
| Manila–2nd | Jaime Lopez | Lakas | Nestor Ponce Jr. | Liberal |
| Manila–3rd | Leonardo Fugoso | Liberal | Harry Angping | LAMMP |
| Manila–4th | Ramon Bagatsing Jr. | LAMMP | Rodolfo Bacani | Liberal |
| Manila–5th | Amado Bagatsing | LAMMP | Joey Hizon | Liberal |
| Manila–6th | Rosenda Ann Ocampo | NPC | Rosenda Ann Ocampo | NPC |
| Marikina | Romeo Candazo | Liberal | Romeo Candazo | Liberal |
| Marinduque | Carmencita Reyes | Lakas | Edmundo Reyes Jr. | Lakas |
| Masbate–1st | Vida Espinosa | Lakas | Vida Espinosa | Lakas |
| Masbate–2nd | Luz Cleta Bakunawa | LAMMP | Emilio Espinosa Jr. | Lakas |
| Masbate–3rd | Fausto Seachon Jr. | Lakas | Fausto Seachon Jr. | Lakas |
| Misamis Occidental–1st | Percival Catane | Lakas | Percival Catane | Lakas |
| Misamis Occidental–2nd | Herminia Ramiro | Lakas | Hilarion Ramiro Jr. | Lakas |
| Misamis Oriental–1st | Homobono Cesar | Lakas | Oscar Moreno | Lakas |
| Misamis Oriental–2nd | Victorico Chaves | Lakas | Augusto Baculio | LAMMP |
| Mountain Province | Victor Dominguez | Lakas | Josephine Dominguez | Lakas |
| Muntinlupa | New district | | Ignacio Bunye | Lakas |
| Negros Occidental–1st | Jules Ledesma | Lakas | Jules Ledesma | Lakas |
| Negros Occidental–2nd | Alfredo Marañon | Lakas | Alfredo Marañon | Lakas |
| Negros Occidental–3rd | Jose Carlos Lacson | Lakas | Edith Yotoko-Villanueva | Independent |
| Negros Occidental–4th | Edward Matti | NPC | Charlie Cojuangco | NPC |
| Negros Occidental–5th | Mariano Yulo | Lakas | Jose Apolinario Lozada | Lakas |
| Negros Occidental–6th | Genaro Alvarez Jr. | NPC | Genaro Alvarez Jr. | NPC |
| Negros Oriental–1st | Jerome Paras | Lakas | Jacinto Paras | Lakas |
| Negros Oriental–2nd | Miguel Romero | Lakas | Emilio Macias | LAMMP |
| Negros Oriental–3rd | Margarito Teves | Lakas | Herminio Teves | Lakas |
| Northern Samar–1st | Raul Daza | Liberal | Harlin Abayon | Liberal |
| Northern Samar–2nd | Wilmar Lucero | Liberal | Romualdo Vicencio | Lakas |
| Nueva Ecija–1st | Renato Diaz | Lakas | Josefina Joson | LAMMP |
| Nueva Ecija–2nd | Eleuterio Violago | Lakas | Simeon Garcia Jr. | LAMMP |
| Nueva Ecija–3rd | Pacifico Fajardo | Lakas | Pacifico Fajardo | Lakas |
| Nueva Ecija–4th | Julita Villareal | Lakas | Julita Villareal | Lakas |
| Nueva Vizcaya | Carlos Padilla | LAMMP | Carlos Padilla | LAMMP |
| Occidental Mindoro | Jose Villarosa | Lakas | Girlie Villarosa | Lakas |
| Oriental Mindoro–1st | Renato Leviste | Lakas | Renato Leviste | Lakas |
| Oriental Mindoro–2nd | Jesus Punzalan | Lakas | Manuel Andaya | LAMMP |
| Palawan–1st | Vicente Sandoval | Lakas | Vicente Sandoval | Lakas |
| Palawan–2nd | Alfredo Amor Abueg Jr. | Lakas | Alfredo Amor Abueg Jr. | Lakas |
| Pampanga–1st | Carmelo Lazatin Sr. | Lakas | Francis Nepomuceno | LAMMP |
| Pampanga–2nd | Zenaida Cruz-Ducut | LAMMP | Zenaida Cruz-Ducut | LAMMP |
| Pampanga–3rd | Oscar Samson Rodriguez | Lakas | Oscar Samson Rodriguez | Lakas |
| Pampanga–4th | Emigdio Bondoc | Lakas | Juan Pablo Bondoc | Lakas |
| Pangasinan–1st | Hernani Braganza | Lakas | Hernani Braganza | Lakas |
| Pangasinan–2nd | Antonio Bengson III | Lakas | Teodoro Cruz | LAMMP |
| Pangasinan–3rd | Eric Galo Acuña | Lakas | Generoso Tulagan | LAMMP |
| Pangasinan–4th | Jose de Venecia Jr. | Lakas | Benjamin Lim | Lakas |
| Pangasinan–5th | Amadeo Perez Jr. | Lakas | Amadeo Perez Jr. | Lakas |
| Pangasinan–6th | Ranjit Shahani | Lakas | Ranjit Shahani | Lakas |
| Parañaque | Roilo Golez | LAMMP | Roilo Golez | LAMMP |
| Pasay | Jovito Claudio | Lakas | Rolando Briones | NPC |
| Pasig | Rufino Javier | NPC | Henry Lanot | LAMMP |
| Quezon–1st | Wilfrido Enverga | LAMMP | Rafael Nantes | Reporma |
| Quezon–2nd | Marcial Punzalan Jr. | Lakas | Marcial Punzalan Jr. | Lakas |
| Quezon–3rd | Danilo Suarez | Lakas | Danilo Suarez | Lakas |
| Quezon–4th | Wigberto Tañada | Liberal | Wigberto Tañada | Liberal |
| Quezon City–1st | Reynaldo Calalay | LAMMP | Reynaldo Calalay | LAMMP |
| Quezon City–2nd | Dante Liban | Lakas | Dante Liban | Lakas |
| Quezon City–3rd | Mike Defensor | Liberal | Mike Defensor | Liberal |
| Quezon City–4th | Feliciano Belmonte Jr. | Lakas | Feliciano Belmonte Jr. | Lakas |
| Quirino | Junie Cua | Lakas | Maria Angela Cua | Lakas |
| Rizal–1st | Gilberto Duavit Sr. | NPC | Gilberto Duavit Sr. | NPC |
| Rizal–2nd | Emigdio Tanjuatco Jr. | Lakas | Isidro Rodriguez Jr. | LAMMP |
| Romblon | Eleandro Jesus Madrona | Lakas | Eleandro Jesus Madrona | Lakas |
| Samar–1st | Rodolfo Tuazon | Lakas | Rodolfo Tuazon | Lakas |
| Samar–2nd | Catalino Figueroa | Lakas | Antonio Nachura | Liberal |
| San Juan | Ronaldo Zamora | LAMMP | Jose Mari Gonzales | LAMMP |
| Sarangani | James Chiongbian | Lakas | No winner | |
| Siquijor | Orlando Fua | Lakas | Orlando Fua Jr. | Lakas |
| Sorsogon–1st | Salvador Escudero | Lakas | Francis Escudero | Lakas |
| Sorsogon–2nd | Bonifacio Gillego | Lakas | Rodolfo Gonzales | Lakas |
| South Cotabato–1st | Luwalhati Antonino | LAMMP | Luwalhati Antonino | LAMMP |
| South Cotabato–2nd | Daisy Avance Fuentes | LAMMP | Daisy Avance Fuentes | LAMMP |
| Southern Leyte | Roger Mercado | Lakas | Aniceto Saludo Jr. | LAMMP |
| Sultan Kudarat | Angelo Montilla | NPC | Angelo Montilla | NPC |
| Sulu–1st | Bensaudi Tulawie | Lakas | Hussin Ututalum Amin | Lakas |
| Sulu–2nd | Asani Tammang | Lakas | Asani Tammang | Lakas |
| Surigao del Norte–1st | Constantino Navarro Jr. | Lakas | Constantino Navarro Jr. | Lakas |
| Surigao del Norte–2nd | Robert Barbers | Lakas | Robert Barbers | Lakas |
| Surigao del Sur–1st | Mario Ty | Lakas | Prospero Pichay Jr. | Lakas |
| Surigao del Sur–2nd | Jesnar Falcon | Lakas | Jesnar Falcon | Lakas |
| Taguig–Pateros | Dante Tiñga | Lakas | Alan Peter Cayetano | Liberal |
| Tarlac–1st | Peping Cojuangco | Kampi | Gilbert Teodoro | NPC |
| Tarlac–2nd | Jose Yap | Lakas | Benigno Aquino III | Liberal |
| Tarlac–3rd | Herminio Aquino | Liberal | Jesli Lapus | Lakas |
| Tawi-Tawi | Nur Jaafar | Lakas | Nur Jaafar | Lakas |
| Valenzuela | Antonio Serapio | NPC | Magi Gunigundo | Lakas |
| Zambales–1st | James Gordon Jr. | Lakas | James Gordon Jr. | Lakas |
| Zambales–2nd | Antonio Diaz | Lakas | Antonio Diaz | Lakas |
| Zamboanga City | Maria Clara Lobregat | LAMMP | Celso Lobregat | LAMMP |
| Zamboanga del Norte–1st | Romeo Jalosjos Sr. | LAMMP | Romeo Jalosjos Sr. | LAMMP |
| Zamboanga del Norte–2nd | Cresente Llorente Jr. | Lakas | Roseller Barinaga | LAMMP |
| Zamboanga del Norte–3rd | Angel Carloto | Lakas | Angeles Carloto II | Lakas |
| Zamboanga del Sur–1st | Alejandro Urro | Lakas | Alejandro Urro | Lakas |
| Zamboanga del Sur–2nd | Antonio Cerilles | NPC | Aurora E. Cerilles | LAMMP |
| Zamboanga del Sur–3rd | Belma Cabilao | Lakas | George T. Hofer | LAMMP |

=== Party-list election ===
There were 52 seats for sectoral representatives that were contested. Each party has to get 2% of the national vote to win one seat; they would win an additional seat for every 2% of the vote, up to the maximum three seats. Only 14 party-list representatives were elected under this rule, leaving 38 unfilled seats. Eventually, the "2–4–6%" rule was ruled as unconstitutional by the Supreme Court on October 6, 2000 on the case Veterans Federation Party, et al. vs. COMELEC. Despite this ruling, no additional seats were awarded to any party-lists.

| Party | Votes | % | Seats |
|---|---|---|---|
| Association of Philippine Electric Cooperatives | 503,487 | 5.50 | 2 |
| Alyansang Bayanihan ng mga Magsasaka, Manggagawang Bukid at Mangingisda | 321,646 | 3.51 | 1 |
| Alagad | 312,500 | 3.41 | 1 |
| Veterans Federation Party | 304,902 | 3.33 | 1 |
| Probinsya Muna Development Initiative | 255,184 | 2.79 | 1 |
| Adhikain at Kilusan ng Ordinaryong Tao Para sa Lupa, Pabahay, Hanapbuhay at Kaunlaran | 239,042 | 2.61 | 1 |
| National Federation of Small Coconut Farmers Organization | 238,303 | 2.60 | 1 |
| Abanse! Pinay | 235,548 | 2.57 | 1 |
| Akbayan | 232,376 | 2.54 | 1 |
| Luzon Farmers Party | 215,643 | 2.36 | 1 |
| Sanlakas | 194,617 | 2.13 | 1 |
| Cooperative NATCCO Network Party | 189,802 | 2.07 | 1 |
| Philippine Coconut Producers Federation | 186,388 | 2.04 | 1 |
| Coalition of Associations of Senior Citizens in the Philippines | 143,444 | 1.57 | 0 |
| Others | 5,582,427 | 60.97 | 0 |
| Total | 9,155,309 | 100.00 | 14 |
| Valid votes | 9,155,309 | 31.26 | |
| Invalid/blank votes | 20,130,466 | 68.74 | |
| Total votes | 29,285,775 | 100.00 | |
| Registered voters/turnout | 33,873,665 | 86.46 | |
Source: Supreme Court, Dieter Nohlen

== Defeated incumbents ==
1. Agusan del Norte–2nd: Eduardo Rama Sr. (Lakas) lost to Roan Libarios (LAMMP)
2. Albay–3rd: Romeo Salalima (Lakas) lost to Joey Salceda (LAMMP)
3. Cagayan–3rd: Manuel Mamba (Lakas) lost to Rodolfo Aguinaldo (Lakas)
4. Caloocan–1st: Bobby Guanzon (Lakas) lost to Recom Echiverri (Lakas)
5. Camarines Sur–2nd: Leopoldo San Buenaventura (Lakas) lost to Jaime Jacob (Aksyon)
6. Davao del Sur–1st: Alejandro Almendras Jr. (Lakas) lost to Douglas Cagas (Reporma)
7. Ilocos Norte–2nd: Simeon Valdez (Lakas) lost to Imee Marcos (KBL)
8. Ilocos Sur–1st: Mariano Tajon (Lakas) lost to Salacnib Baterina (LAMMP)
9. Lanao del Sur–2nd: Pangalian Balindong (Lakas) lost to Benasing Macarambon Jr. (Ompia)
10. Misamis Oriental–1st: Homobono Cesar (Lakas) lost to Oscar Moreno (Lakas)
11. Northern Samar–2nd: Wilmar Lucero (Liberal) lost to Romualdo Vicencio (Lakas)
12. Nueva Ecija–1st: Renato Diaz (Lakas) lost to Josefina Joson (LAMMP)
13. Nueva Ecija–2nd: Eleuterio Violago (Lakas) lost to Simeon Garcia Jr. (LAMMP)
14. Pangasinan–2nd: Antonio Bengson III (Lakas) lost to Teodoro Cruz (LAMMP)
15. Pangasinan–3rd: Eric Galo Acuña (Lakas) lost to Generoso Tulagan (LAMMP)
16. Samar–2nd: Catalino Figueroa (Lakas) lost to Antonio Nachura (Liberal)
17. Southern Leyte: Roger Mercado (Lakas) lost to Aniceto Saludo Jr. (LAMMP)
18. Sulu–1st: Bensaudi Tulawie (Lakas) lost to Hussin Ututalum Amin (Lakas)
19. Zamboanga del Norte–2nd: Cresente Llorente Jr. (Lakas) lost to Roseller Barinaga (LAMMP)
20. Zamboanga del Sur–3rd: Belma Cabilao (Lakas) lost to George T. Hofer (LAMMP)

== See also ==
- 11th Congress of the Philippines

== Bibliography ==
- Paras, Corazon L. (2000). The Presidents of the Senate of the Republic of the Philippines. Giraffe Books. ISBN 971-8832-24-6.
- Pobre, Cesar P. (2000). Philippine Legislature 100 Years. Philippine Historical Association. ISBN 971-92245-0-9.
