= 11th Congress of the Philippines =

32nd legislative term of the Philippines

←	10th	12th	→
- GSIS Building (2010) (top) and Batasang Pambansa Complex (2010) (bottom)

Overview
- Term: July 27, 1998 – June 8, 2001
- President: Joseph Estrada (until January 20, 2001); Gloria Macapagal Arroyo (from January 20, 2001)
- Vice President: Gloria Macapagal Arroyo (until January 20, 2001); Teofisto Guingona Jr. (from February 7, 2001)

Senate
- Members: 24
- President: Marcelo Fernan (until June 28, 1999); Blas Ople (June 29, 1999 – April 12, 2000); Franklin Drilon (April 12 – November 13, 2000); Nene Pimentel (from November 13, 2000)
- President pro tempore: Blas Ople (until June 29, 1999, and from April 12, 2000); John Henry Osmeña (June 29, 1999 – April 12, 2000)
- Majority leader: Franklin Drilon (until April 12, 2000); Francisco Tatad (from April 12, 2000)
- Minority leader: Teofisto Guingona Jr. (until February 7, 2001); Rene Cayetano (from February 9, 2001)

House of Representatives
- Members: 257
- Speaker: Manny Villar (until November 13, 2000); Arnulfo Fuentebella (November 13, 2000 – January 24, 2001); Feliciano Belmonte Jr. (from January 24, 2001)
- Deputy Speakers: Alfredo Abueg Jr. (until November 22, 2000); Eduardo Gullas (until January 17, 2000); Daisy Avance Fuentes (until January 24, 2001); Erico Aumentado (January 24 – November 22, 2000); Butz Aquino (November 22, 2000 – January 24, 2001); Gerardo Espina Sr. (November 22, 2000 – January 24, 2001); Carlos Padilla (from January 24, 2001); Raul M. Gonzalez (from January 24, 2001); Nur Jaafar (from January 24, 2001)
- Majority leader: Mar Roxas (until January 17, 2000); Eduardo Gullas (January 17 – November 13, 2000); Bella Angara (November 13, 2000 – January 24, 2001); Sergio Apostol (from January 24, 2001)
- Minority leader: Feliciano Belmonte Jr. (until January 24, 2001); Butz Aquino (from January 24, 2001)

The 11th Congress of the Philippines (Filipino: Ikalabing-isang Kongreso ng Pilipinas), composed of the Philippine Senate and House of Representatives, met from July 27, 1998, until June 8, 2001, during the 31-month presidency of Joseph Estrada and the first four months of Gloria Macapagal Arroyo's presidency. The convening of the 11th Congress followed the 1998 national elections, which replaced half of the Senate membership, and the entire membership of the House of Representatives. The Estrada impeachment was the highlight of the 11th Congress.

== Sessions ==
- First Regular Session: July 27, 1998 – June 4, 1999
  - First Special Session: January 4 – February 5, 1999
- Second Regular Session: July 26, 1999 – June 9, 2000
  - Second Special Session: January 3 – February 4, 2000
- Third Regular Session: July 24, 2000 – June 8, 2001
  - Third Special Session: January 1 – February 16, 2001

== Leadership ==
=== Senate ===
Senate President

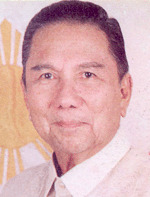
Marcelo Fernan,
until June 28, 1999

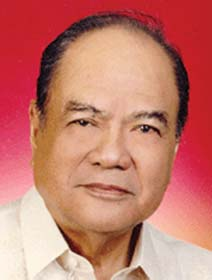
Blas Ople,
June 29, 1999 – July 12, 2000

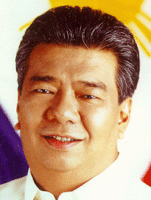
Franklin Drilon,
July 12 – November 13, 2000

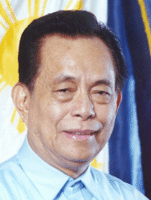
Nene Pimentel,
from November 13, 2000

- President:
  - Marcelo Fernan (LDP), until June 28, 1999
  - Blas Ople (LDP), June 29, 1999 – April 12, 2000
  - Franklin Drilon (LAMMP), April 12 – November 13, 2000
  - Nene Pimentel (PDP–Laban), from November 13, 2000
- President pro tempore:
  - Blas Ople (LDP), until June 29, 1999, and from April 12, 2000
  - John Henry Osmeña (LDP), June 29, 1999 – April 12, 2000
- Majority Floor Leader:
  - Franklin Drilon (LAMMP), until April 12, 2000
  - Francisco Tatad (Gabay Bayan), from April 12, 2000
- Minority Floor Leader:
  - Teofisto Guingona Jr. (Lakas), until February 7, 2001
  - Rene Cayetano (Lakas), from February 9, 2001

=== House of Representatives ===
House Speaker

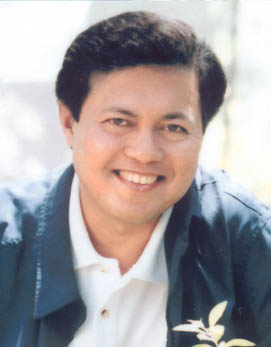
Manny Villar,
until November 13, 2000

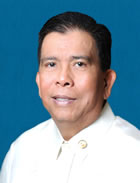
Arnulfo Fuentebella,
November 13, 2000 – January 24, 2001

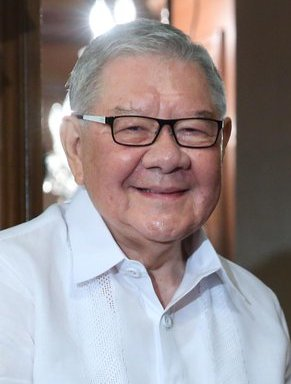
Feliciano Belmonte Jr.,
from January 24, 2001

- Speaker:
  - Manny Villar (Las Piñas–Lone, LAMMP), until November 13, 2000
  - Arnulfo Fuentebella (Camarines Sur–3rd, LAMMP), November 13, 2000 – January 24, 2001
  - Feliciano Belmonte Jr. (Quezon City–4th, Lakas), from January 24, 2001
- Deputy Speakers:
  - Luzon:
    - Alfredo Abueg Jr. (Palawan–2nd, LAMMP), until November 22, 2000
    - Butz Aquino (Makati–2nd, LDP), November 22, 2000 – January 24, 2001
    - Carlos Padilla (Nueva Vizcaya–Lone, LAMMP), from January 24, 2001
  - Visayas:
    - Eduardo Gullas (Cebu–1st, LAMMP), until January 17, 2000
    - Erico Aumentado (Bohol–1st, LAMMP), January 24 – November 22, 2000
    - Gerardo Espina Sr. (Biliran–Lone, NPC), November 22, 2000 – January 24, 2001
    - Raul M. Gonzalez (Iloilo City–Lone, Nacionalista), from January 24, 2001
  - Mindanao:
    - Daisy Avance Fuentes (South Cotabato–2nd, LAMMP), until January 24, 2001
    - Nur Jaafar (Tawi-Tawi–Lone, LAMMP), from January 24, 2001
- Majority Floor Leader:
  - Mar Roxas (Capiz–1st, Liberal), until January 17, 2000
  - Eduardo Gullas (Cebu–1st, LAMMP), January 17 – November 13, 2000
  - Bella Angara (Aurora–Lone, LDP), November 13, 2000 – January 24, 2001
  - Sergio Apostol (Leyte–2nd, Lakas), from January 24, 2001
- Minority Floor Leader:
  - Feliciano Belmonte Jr. (Quezon City–4th, Lakas), until January 24, 2001
  - Butz Aquino (Makati–2nd, LDP), from January 24, 2001

== Members ==
=== Senate ===
Final Senate composition.

The following are the terms of the senators of this Congress, according to the date of election:

- For senators elected on May 8, 1995: June 30, 1995 – June 30, 2001
- For senators elected on May 11, 1998: June 30, 1998 – June 30, 2004

Senator	Party (Note: Party affiliation as of the 1998 election.)	Term	Term end
Tessie Aquino-Oreta	LDP	1	2004
Robert Barbers	Lakas	1	2004
Rodolfo Biazon	LDP	1	2004
Rene Cayetano	Lakas	1	2004
Nikki Coseteng	NPC	2	2001
Miriam Defensor Santiago	PRP	1	2001
Franklin Drilon	LAMMP	1	2001
Marcelo Fernan (Note: Marcelo Fernan died on July 11, 1999.)	LDP	1	2001
Teofisto Guingona Jr. (Note: Teofisto Guingona Jr. resigned on February 7, 2001, upon being appointed as Vice President of the Philippines.)	Lakas	1	2004
Juan Flavier	Lakas	1	2001
Gregorio Honasan	Independent	1	2001
Robert Jaworski	LAMMP	1	2004
Loren Legarda	Lakas	1	2004
Ramon Magsaysay Jr.	LAMMP	1	2001
Blas Ople	LDP	2	2004
John Henry Osmeña	LDP	1	2004
Serge Osmeña	Liberal	1	2001
Nene Pimentel	PDP–Laban	1	2004
Juan Ponce Enrile	Independent	1	2001
Ramon Revilla Sr.	LAMMP	2	2004
Raul Roco (Note: Raul Roco resigned on February 9, 2001, upon being appointed as Secretary of Education, Culture and Sports.)	Aksyon	2	2001
Tito Sotto	LDP	2	2004
Francisco Tatad	Gabay Bayan	2	2001

=== House of Representatives ===
Final House of Representatives composition.

Eleventh Congress representation map of the Philippines

Province/City	District	Representative	Party (Note: Party affiliation at election.)	Term
Abra	Lone	Vicente Ysidro Valera	Lakas	1
Agusan del Norte	1st	Leovigildo Banaag	LAMMP	1
Agusan del Norte	2nd	Roan Libarios	LAMMP	1
Agusan del Sur	Lone	Alex Bascug	LAMMP	1
Aklan	Lone	Allen Quimpo	LAMMP	3
Albay	1st	Krisel Lagman	LAMMP	1
Albay	2nd	Norma Imperial (Note: Norma Imperial died on September 29, 2000.)	Lakas	1
Albay	3rd	Joey Salceda	LAMMP	1
Antipolo	Lone	Victor Sumulong	Lakas	1
Antique	Lone	Jovito Plameras Jr.	Lakas	1
Apayao	Lone	Elias Bulut	Lakas	3
Aurora	Lone	Bella Angara	LAMMP	2
Bacolod	Lone	Juan Orola Jr.	LAMMP	1
Baguio	Lone	Bernardo Vergara	Lakas	3
Basilan	Lone	Abdulgani Salapuddin	Lakas	1
Bataan	1st	Antonino Roman	Lakas	1
Bataan	2nd	Tet Garcia	Lakas	2
Batanes	Lone	Florencio Abad	Liberal	2
Batangas	1st	Eduardo Ermita (Note: Eduardo Ermita resigned on January 25, 2001, upon being appointed as Secretary of National Defense.)	Lakas	3
Batangas	2nd	Edgar Mendoza	Lakas	1
Batangas	3rd	Jose Laurel IV	Lakas	1
Batangas	4th	Ralph Recto	Lakas	3
Benguet	Lone	Ronald Cosalan	Lakas	2
Biliran	Lone	Gerardo Espina Sr.	Lakas	2
Bohol	1st	Ernesto Herrera	LAMMP	1
Bohol	2nd	Erico Aumentado	Lakas	3
Bohol	3rd	Eladio Jala	LAMMP	1
Bukidnon	1st	Nereus Acosta	Liberal	1
Bukidnon	2nd	Reginaldo Tilanduca	Lakas	3
Bukidnon	3rd	Juan Miguel Zubiri	Lakas	1
Bulacan	1st	Wilhelmino Sy-Alvarado	Lakas	1
Bulacan	2nd	Pedro Pancho	Lakas	3
Bulacan	3rd	Ricardo Silverio	Lakas	3
Bulacan	4th	Angelito Sarmiento	Lakas	3
Cagayan	1st	Jack Enrile	Independent	1
Cagayan	2nd	Edgar Lara	NPC	3
Cagayan	3rd	Rodolfo Aguinaldo (Note: Rodolfo Aguinaldo died on June 12, 2001.)	Lakas	1
Cagayan de Oro	Lone	Constantino Jaraula	LAMMP	1
Caloocan	1st	Recom Echiverri	Lakas	1
Caloocan	2nd	Luis Asistio	LAMMP	3
Camarines Norte	Lone	Roy Padilla Jr.	LAMMP	1
Camarines Sur	1st	Rolando Andaya Jr.	Lakas	1
Camarines Sur	2nd	Jaime Jacob	Aksyon	1
Camarines Sur	3rd	Arnulfo Fuentebella	NPC	3
Camarines Sur	4th	Salvio Fortuno	LAMMP	1
Camiguin	Lone	Jurdin Jesus Romualdo	Lakas	1
Capiz	1st	Mar Roxas (Note: Mar Roxas resigned on January 2, 2000, upon being appointed as Secretary of Trade and Industry.)	Liberal	3
Capiz	2nd	Vicente Andaya Jr.	Lakas	3
Catanduanes	Lone	Leandro Verceles Jr.	Lakas	3
Cavite	1st	Plaridel Abaya	NPC	2
Cavite	2nd	Ayong Maliksi	LAMMP	1
Cavite	3rd	Napoleon Beratio	LAMMP	1
Cebu	1st	Eduardo Gullas	PROMDI	3
Cebu	2nd	Simeon Kintanar	Lakas	1
Cebu	3rd	Antonio Yapha	LAMMP	1
Cebu	4th	Clavel Martinez	PROMDI	1
Cebu	5th	Ace Durano	Lakas	1
Cebu	6th	Efren Herrera	Lakas	1
Cebu City	1st	Raoul del Mar	PROMDI	1
Cebu City	2nd	Nancy Cuenco	PROMDI	1
Compostela Valley	1st	Rogelio Sarmiento	Lakas	3
Compostela Valley	2nd	Prospero Amatong	Lakas	1
Cotabato	1st	Anthony Dequiña	Lakas	3
Cotabato	2nd	Gregorio Ipong	LAMMP	1
Davao City	1st	Rodrigo Duterte	LAMMP	1
Davao City	2nd	Manuel Garcia	Lakas	3
Davao City	3rd	Ruy Elias Lopez	LAMMP	1
Davao del Norte	1st	Pantaleon Alvarez (Note: Pantaleon Alvarez resigned on January 24, 2001, upon being appointed as Secretary of Transportation.)	Reporma	1
Davao del Norte	2nd	Antonio Floirendo Jr.	Lakas	1
Davao del Sur	1st	Douglas Cagas	Reporma	1
Davao del Sur	2nd	Franklin Bautista	Lakas	1
Davao Oriental	1st	Maria Elena Palma-Gil	Lakas	3
Davao Oriental	2nd	Joel Mayo Almario	Lakas	1
Eastern Samar	Lone	Marcelino Libanan	LAMMP	1
Guimaras	Lone	Emily Lopez	Lakas	1
Ifugao	Lone	Benjamin Cappleman	LAMMP	3
Ilocos Norte	1st	Rodolfo Fariñas	Independent	1
Ilocos Norte	2nd	Imee Marcos	KBL	1
Ilocos Sur	1st	Salacnib Baterina	LAMMP	1
Ilocos Sur	2nd	Grace Singson	Lakas	1
Iloilo	1st	Nimfa Garin	Lakas	1
Iloilo	2nd	Augusto Syjuco Jr.	Lakas	1
Iloilo	3rd	Manuel Parcon	Lakas	1
Iloilo	4th	Narciso Monfort	Lakas	2
Iloilo	5th	Rolex Suplico	LAMMP	1
Iloilo City	Lone	Raul M. Gonzalez	Lakas	2
Isabela	1st	Rodolfo Albano III	Lakas	1
Isabela	2nd	Faustino Dy Jr.	Lakas	3
Isabela	3rd	Ramon Reyes	Lakas	1
Isabela	4th	Heherson Alvarez (Note: Heherson Alvarez resigned on March 29, 2001, upon being appointed as Secretary of Environment and Natural Resources.)	Lakas	1
Kalinga	Lone	Lawrence Wacnang	Lakas	1
La Union	1st	Manuel Ortega	Lakas	1
La Union	2nd	Tomas Dumpit	LAMMP	1
Laguna	1st	Uliran Joaquin	LAMMP	1
Laguna	2nd	Jun Chipeco	Lakas	2
Laguna	3rd	Danton Bueser	Liberal	1
Laguna	4th	Rodolfo San Luis	LAMMP	1
Lanao del Norte	1st	Alipio Cirilo Badelles	LAMMP	1
Lanao del Norte	2nd	Abdullah Mangotara	Lakas	2
Lanao del Sur	1st	Mamintal Adiong Sr.	Lakas	3
Lanao del Sur	2nd	Benasing Macarambon Jr.	Ompia	1
Las Piñas	Lone	Manny Villar	Lakas	3
Leyte	1st	Alfred Romualdez	LAMMP	1
Leyte	2nd	Sergio Apostol	Lakas	3
Leyte	3rd	Eduardo Veloso	Liberal	1
Leyte	4th	Maria Victoria Locsin	Lakas	1
Leyte	5th	Nene Go	Lakas	1
Maguindanao	1st	Didagen Dilangalen	LAMMP	2
Maguindanao	2nd	Simeon Datumanong	Lakas	3
Makati	1st	Joker Arroyo	LAMMP	3
Makati	2nd	Butz Aquino	LAMMP	1
Malabon–Navotas	Lone	Ricky Sandoval	Lakas	1
Mandaluyong	Lone	Neptali Gonzales II	Lakas	2
Manila	1st	Ernesto Nieva	LAMMP	1
Manila	2nd	Nestor Ponce Jr.	Liberal	1
Manila	3rd	Harry Angping	LAMMP	1
Manila	4th	Rodolfo Bacani	Liberal	1
Manila	5th	Joey Hizon	Liberal	1
Manila	6th	Rosenda Ann Ocampo	NPC	3
Marikina	Lone	Romeo Candazo	Liberal	3
Marinduque	Lone	Edmundo Reyes Jr.	Lakas	1
Masbate	1st	Vida Espinosa	Lakas	2
Masbate	2nd	Emilio Espinosa Jr.	Lakas	1
Masbate	3rd	Fausto Seachon Jr.	Lakas	2
Misamis Occidental	1st	Percival Catane (Note: Percival Catane died on July 15, 1998.)	Lakas	3
Misamis Occidental	2nd	Hilarion Ramiro Jr. (Note: Hilarion Ramiro Jr. died on January 5, 2001.)	Lakas	1
Misamis Oriental	1st	Oscar Moreno	Lakas	1
Misamis Oriental	2nd	Augusto Baculio	LAMMP	1
Mountain Province	Lone	Josephine Dominguez	Lakas	1
Muntinlupa	Lone	Ignacio Bunye	Lakas	1
Negros Occidental	1st	Jules Ledesma	Lakas	2
Negros Occidental	2nd	Alfredo Marañon	Lakas	2
Negros Occidental	3rd	Edith Yotoko-Villanueva	Independent	1
Negros Occidental	4th	Charlie Cojuangco	NPC	1
Negros Occidental	5th	Jose Apolinario Lozada	Lakas	1
Negros Occidental	6th	Genaro Alvarez Jr.	NPC	2
Negros Oriental	1st	Jacinto Paras	Lakas	1
Negros Oriental	2nd	Emilio Macias	LAMMP	1
Negros Oriental	3rd	Herminio Teves	Lakas	1
Northern Samar	1st	Harlin Abayon	Liberal	1
Northern Samar	2nd	Romualdo Vicencio	Lakas	1
Nueva Ecija	1st	Josefina Joson	LAMMP	1
Nueva Ecija	2nd	Simeon Garcia Jr.	LAMMP	1
Nueva Ecija	3rd	Pacifico Fajardo	Lakas	3
Nueva Ecija	4th	Julita Lorenzo-Villareal	Lakas	2
Nueva Vizcaya	Lone	Carlos Padilla	LAMMP	2
Occidental Mindoro	Lone	Girlie Villarosa (Note: Girlie Villarosa was removed by the House of Representatives Electoral Tribunal on July 27, 2000, after an electoral protest.)	Lakas	1
Occidental Mindoro	Lone	Ricardo Quintos (Note: Ricardo Quintos took office on August 29, 2000, after winning an electoral protest against Girlie Villarosa.)	LDP	0
Oriental Mindoro	1st	Renato Leviste	Lakas	3
Oriental Mindoro	2nd	Manuel Andaya	LAMMP	1
Palawan	1st	Vicente Sandoval	Lakas	2
Palawan	2nd	Alfredo Abueg Jr.	Lakas	3
Pampanga	1st	Francis Nepomuceno	LAMMP	1
Pampanga	2nd	Zenaida Cruz-Ducut	LAMMP	2
Pampanga	3rd	Oscar Samson Rodriguez	Lakas	2
Pampanga	4th	Juan Pablo Bondoc	Lakas	1
Pangasinan	1st	Hernani Braganza	Lakas	2
Pangasinan	2nd	Teodoro Cruz	LAMMP	1
Pangasinan	3rd	Generoso Tulagan	LAMMP	1
Pangasinan	4th	Benjamin Lim	Lakas	1
Pangasinan	5th	Amadeo Perez Jr.	Lakas	3
Pangasinan	6th	Ranjit Shahani	Lakas	2
Parañaque	Lone	Roilo Golez (Note: Roilo Golez resigned on February 19, 2001, upon being appointed as National Security Adviser.)	LAMMP	3
Pasay	Lone	Rolando Briones	NPC	1
Pasig	Lone	Henry Lanot	LAMMP	1
Quezon	1st	Rafael Nantes	Reporma	1
Quezon	2nd	Marcial Punzalan Jr. (Note: Marcial Punzalan Jr. died on May 12, 2001.)	Lakas	3
Quezon	3rd	Danilo Suarez	Lakas	3
Quezon	4th	Wigberto Tañada	Liberal	2
Quezon City	1st	Reynaldo Calalay	LAMMP	2
Quezon City	2nd	Dante Liban	Lakas	3
Quezon City	3rd	Mike Defensor	Liberal	2
Quezon City	4th	Feliciano Belmonte Jr.	Lakas	3
Quirino	Lone	Maria Angela Cua	Lakas	1
Rizal	1st	Gilberto Duavit Sr.	NPC	3
Rizal	2nd	Isidro Rodriguez Jr.	LAMMP	1
Romblon	Lone	Eleandro Jesus Madrona	Lakas	3
Samar	1st	Rodolfo Tuazon	Lakas	3
Samar	2nd	Antonio Nachura	Liberal	1
San Juan	Lone	Jose Mari Gonzales	LAMMP	1
Sarangani	Lone	Vacant (Note: Juan Domino received the highest number of votes in the 1998 election, but was not proclaimed as congressman-elect after the Second Division of the Commission on Election (COMELEC) disqualified him on May 6, 1998, due to lack of residency. Domino's disqualification was affirmed by the COMELEC en banc on May 29, 1998, and by the Supreme Court on July 19, 1999.)	—	—
Siquijor	Lone	Orlando Fua Jr.	Lakas	1
Sorsogon	1st	Francis Escudero	Lakas	1
Sorsogon	2nd	Rodolfo Gonzales	Lakas	1
South Cotabato	1st	Luwalhati Antonino	LAMMP	3
South Cotabato	2nd	Daisy Avance Fuentes	LAMMP	3
Southern Leyte	Lone	Aniceto Saludo Jr.	LAMMP	1
Sultan Kudarat	Lone	Angelo Montilla	NPC	2
Sulu	1st	Hussin Ututalum Amin	Lakas	1
Sulu	2nd	Asani Tammang	Lakas	3
Surigao del Norte	1st	Constantino Navarro Jr.	Lakas	2
Surigao del Norte	2nd	Ace Barbers	Lakas	1
Surigao del Sur	1st	Prospero Pichay Jr.	Lakas	1
Surigao del Sur	2nd	Jesnar Falcon	Lakas	2
Taguig–Pateros	Lone	Alan Peter Cayetano	Liberal	1
Tarlac	1st	Gilbert Teodoro	NPC	1
Tarlac	2nd	Benigno Aquino III	Liberal	1
Tarlac	3rd	Jesli Lapus	Lakas	1
Tawi-Tawi	Lone	Nur Jaafar	Lakas	3
Valenzuela	Lone	Magi Gunigundo	Lakas	1
Zambales	1st	James Gordon Jr.	Lakas	2
Zambales	2nd	Antonio Diaz	Lakas	3
Zamboanga City	Lone	Celso Lobregat	LAMMP	1
Zamboanga del Norte	1st	Romeo Jalosjos Sr.	LAMMP	2
Zamboanga del Norte	2nd	Roseller Barinaga	LAMMP	1
Zamboanga del Norte	3rd	Angeles Carloto II	Lakas	1
Zamboanga del Sur	1st	Alejandro Urro	Lakas	3
Zamboanga del Sur	2nd	Aurora E. Cerilles	LAMMP	1
Zamboanga del Sur	3rd	George T. Hofer	LAMMP	1
Party-list		Leonardo Montemayor (Note: Leonardo Montemayor resigned on February 12, 2001, upon being appointed as Secretary of Agriculture.)	ABA	3
Party-list		Dioscoro Granada (Note: Dioscoro Granada took office on March 19, 2001, to succeed Leonardo Montemayor.)	ABA	0
Party-list		Patricia Sarenas	Abanse	1
Party-list		Etta Rosales	Akbayan	1
Party-list		Ariel Zartiga	AKO	3
Party-list		Diogenes Osabel	Alagad	1
Party-list		Melvyn Eballe	APEC	1
Party-list		Rene Silos	APEC	1
Party-list		Benjamin Cruz	Butil	1
Party-list		Emerito Calderon	Cocofed	1
Party-list		Cresente Paez	Coop-NATCCO	1
Party-list		Gorgonio Unde	NFSCFO	1
Party-list		Joy Augustus Young	PROMDI	1
Party-list		Rene Magtubo (Note: Rene Magtubo was no longer a member of the House of Representatives as of March 19, 2001.)	Sanlakas	1
Party-list		Mario Cruz (Note: Mario Cruz took office on March 19, 2001, to succeed Rene Magtubo.)	Sanlakas	1
Party-list		Eduardo Pilapil	VFP	1

== See also ==
- Congress of the Philippines
- Senate of the Philippines
- House of Representatives of the Philippines
- 1998 Philippine general election
