= AGAP Partylist =

Political party in Philippines

AGAP
- — Philippine partylist —
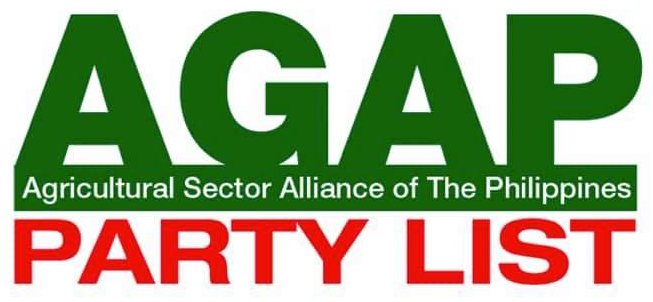
- Full name: Agricultural Sector Alliance of the Philippines, Inc.
- Sector(s) represented: Agriculture
- Founded: 2003; 23 years ago
- COMELEC accreditation: 2006; 20 years ago
- Ideology: Agrarianism
- Colors: Green

Current representation (20th Congress)
- Seats in the House of Representatives: 1 / 3 (Out of 63 party-list seats)
- Representative(s): Nicanor Briones

Website
- www.agripartylist.com

The Agricultural Sector Alliance of the Philippines, Inc. (AGAP) is a party-list in the Philippines. The organization was established in 2003 to protect and promote the welfare of farmers. Since then, it has been pursuing endeavors that would benefit the agricultural industry nationwide.

In the 14 May 2007 election, the party won 2 seats in the nationwide party-list vote. In the 2010, AGAP one 1 seat, down from 2, while in the next election, they regained a seat with 592,463 (2.14% of the popular vote), the most successful election AGAP has had so far. Their incumbent representative is Rep. Nicanor Briones, who was also their representative from 2007 to 2016. Nicanor Briones succeeded Rico Geron, who served as representative from 2013 to 2022.

AGAP is coordinating with different government agencies such as the Department of Agriculture, Department of Finance, Bureau of Customs, Tariff Commission, Presidential Anti-smuggling Task Force and the Office of President on issues that affect the agricultural industry.

== Electoral performance ==
Year	Votes	%	Seats	Representatives to Congress
2007	328,814	2.05%	2	Nicanor Briones, Caesar Cobrador
2010	516,052	1.76%	1	Nicanor Briones
2013	592,463	2.14%	2	Nicanor Briones, Rico Geron
2016	593,748	1.83%	1	Rico Geron
2019	208,752	0.75%	1	Rico Geron
2022	367,533	1.00%	1	Nicanor Briones
2025	469,412	1.12%	1	Nicanor Briones

== Other involvements ==
AGAP President Nicanor Briones has been working with different sectors in protecting farmers' livelihood and economic welfare by fighting against excessive importation of pork that would affect the income of local pork producers and sellers, unfair reduction of tariff rates for imported pork, and technical smuggling. He has been calling for the establishment of several meat inspection laboratories to prevent the spread of African Swine Fever (ASF) as well as indemnification for local pork producers affected by ASF.

In August 2025, along with APEC Partylist representative Sergio Dagooc, sole representative Briones became viral on social media after he was caught by an unknown photographer watching a video of sabong during then incumbent president Bongbong Marcos's 2025 State of the Nation Address. Briones insists that he does not participate in cockfighting or gambling in any form, and said that this was an attempt by alleged "smugglers" to destroy his image. As a result of this incident, Briones lost his seat in the Commission on Appointments as a member of the 12-seated minority bloc and was replaced by LPGMA Partylist representative Allan Ty.
