= Nicanor Briones =

Filipino politician

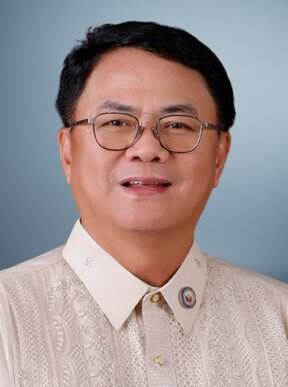
- Official portrait, 2025

Member of the House of Representatives of the Philippines for AGAP
- Incumbent
- Assumed office July 25, 2022
- Preceded by: Rico Geron
- In office 2007–2016 Serving with Caesar Cobrador (2007-2010), Rico Geron (2013-2016)
- Preceded by: Title Established
- Succeeded by: Rico Geron

Personal details
- Born: Nicanor Miral Briones; September 23, 1959 (age 66) San Jose, Batangas, Philippines
- Party: AGAP (party-list; 2007–present)
- Other political affiliations: PDP-Laban (2015–2016)
- Occupation: Politician

Nicanor 'Nikki' Miral Briones (born September 23, 1959) is a politician and is the current representative for the AGAP Partylist for the House of Representatives of the Philippines.

== Career ==
=== Politics ===
Briones was a representative for the AGAP Partylist from 2007 to 2016, from which he was succeeded by Rep. Rico Geron.

In 2012, election watchdog Kontra Daya criticized AGAP, saying Briones was not part of the farmer sector and was, in fact, the owner of a large security firm.

In July 2013, Briones was picked to be the leader of the third-largest political bloc in the Philippine House of Representatives, consisting of 34 members.

In 2016, Briones ran for governor of Batangas under PDP-Laban but lost.

In 2022, Briones was among the nominees of the AGAP Partylist, which gained one seat, he was later picked to be the representative of the partylist.

In August 2025, along with APEC Partylist representative Sergio Dagooc, Briones became viral on social media after he was caught by an unknown photographer watching a video of sabong during then incumbent president Bongbong Marcos's 2025 State of the Nation Address. Briones insists that he does not participate in cockfighting or gambling in any form, and said that this was an attempt by alleged "smugglers" to destroy his image. As a result of this incident, Briones lost his seat in the Commission on Appointments as a member of the 12-seated minority bloc and was replaced by LPGMA Partylist representative Allan Ty.

==== Bills and Committees ====
As of July 2024, Briones has Principally authored 65 bills and Co-authored 16 bills.

Briones is also part of the following committees:

- Cooperatives Development - Chairperson
- Agriculture And Food - Vice Chairperson
- Ways And Means - Vice Chairperson
- Flagship Programs and Projects - Member for the Majority
- Food Security - Member for the Majority
- Public Order and Safety - Member for the Majority
- Public Works and Highways - Member for the Majority
- Tourism - Member for the Majority

== Political positions ==
Briones supports local farming; he aims to increase the budget of the Department of Agriculture to help farmers. Briones stated “Sana tangkilikin natin ang local na produksyon ng mga magsasaka sapagkat mas masarap, mas malinis, ang sariwa, at bawat kilong nabibili ang natutulungan ay bawat Pilipinong manggagawa (I hope we can enjoy the local production of the farmers because it is tastier, cleaner, fresher, and every kilo we buy helps every Filipino worker)”.
