= Abanse! Pinay =

- — Philippine partylist —
- Full name: Abanse, Kababaihan ng Pilipinas
- Abbreviation: Abanse
- Sector(s) represented: Women
- Founded: August 8, 1997; 28 years ago
- Delisted: 2009
- Ideology: Feminism; Social democracy
- Political position: Center-left

Website
- www.abansepinay.com (archived)

Abanse, Kababaihan ng Pilipinas (lit. 'Advance, Women of the Philippines'), also known as Abanse! Pinay (lit. 'Advance! Filipino Women'), was a women's political movement which had party-list representation in the House of Representatives of the Philippines.

== History ==
Abanse, Kababaihan ng Pilipinas or Abanse! Pinay was launched on August 8, 1997, by members of PILIPINA (a mass-based feminist organization), Ugnayan ng Kababaihan sa Politika (UKP), and Women in Nation Building (WIN) for the purpose of securing party-list representation for Filipina women in the House of Representatives through the 1998 election – the first time party-list groups contested for seats in the lower house.

Abanse won a seat in the 1998 election, with its rival women's party-lists Ang Bagong Pilipina, Babayi, National Council of Women in the Philippines, and Gloria's League of Women failing to garner enough votes for a seat. The seat was filled by Patricia Sarenas, who is also the first Mindanaoan party-list representative and sole party-list representative from the island.

No women's party-list outright secured seat in the 2001 elections. The women's group did win a seat but their eligibility was challenged causing a delay of the assumption of Abanse's representative. Commission on Elections (COMELEC) belatedly proclaimed Sarenas as Abasne representative on July 10, 2003.

Abanse contested again in the 2004 elections competing with the Gabriela as the women's partylist but failed to win a seat. It had a similar result in the 2007 elections.

It was delisted as a party-list organization by the COMELEC in 2009.

== Representative ==
Andrea Maria Patricia Sarenas was a member of the House of Representatives for Abanse! Pinay in the 11th (1998–2001) and 12th Congress (2003–2004). Hailing from Davao, Sarenas was a development worker who was involved in the local government support program of the Canadian International Development Agency in Mindanao prior to her role with Abanse.

== Political positions ==
Abanse! Pinay sought to represent the interest of Filipino women. They advocated for laws penalizing domestic violence, decriminalization vagrancy and prostitution, and amending laws concerning adultery and concubinage which they deemed discriminatory towards women.

It claims credit in passing The Solo Parents' Welfare Act of 2000 (Republic Act No. 8972), Anti-Trafficking in Persons, Especially Women and Children, Act of 2003 (R.A. No. 9208), and the Violence Against Women & their Children Law (R.A. No. 9262)
