= Eduardo Roquero =

Filipino physician and politician

The Honorable Eduardo V. Roquero
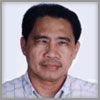
- Official portrait, 2004

City Mayor of San Jose del Monte
- In office June 30, 2007 – August 24, 2009
- Vice Mayor: Reynaldo S. San Pedro
- Preceded by: Angelito M. Sarmiento
- Succeeded by: Reynaldo S. San Pedro (Acting)
- In office June 30, 1995 – June 30, 2004
- Preceded by: Reynaldo Villano
- Succeeded by: Angelito M. Sarmiento
- In office February 2, 1988 – June 30, 1992
- Preceded by: Reynaldo Villano
- Succeeded by: Reynaldo Villano

Member of the Philippine House of Representatives from San Jose del Monte's at-large congressional district
- In office June 30, 2004 – June 30, 2007
- Preceded by: District created
- Succeeded by: Arthur Robes

Personal details
- Born: October 18, 1949 Midsayap, Cotabato, Philippines (now Pigcawayan, Cotabato)
- Died: August 24, 2009 (aged 59) Manila, Philippines
- Party: Lakas-CMD (2008-2009)
- Other political affiliations: KAMPI (2007-2008); Lakas-NUCD (2004-2007); LDP (1995-2004); NPC (1992-1995); Liberal (1988-1992)
- Spouse: Isabelita Roquero
- Profession: Physician

Eduardo V. Roquero or Dr. Ed (October 18, 1949 – August 24, 2009) was a Filipino physician and politician.

Coming from a family of politicians, his father, an uncle and also one of his brothers all served as mayors of Pigkawayan, North Cotabato. Hon. Eduardo V. Roquero began as a Rural Health Physician and NGO Family Planning Physician of San Jose del Monte in the 1980s, at that time, he was also the owner and director of Roquero General Hospital.

He served as Municipal Mayor of San Jose del Monte from 1988–1992 and 1994–2000 and City Mayor of San Jose del Monte from 2000–2004 and 2007–2009, making him the first city mayor from the time San Jose del Monte was converted from a municipality in 2000 to become the province's first component city. Under his administration, San Jose del Monte was converted from a 5th Class to a 1st Class Municipality. He also served as the city's first Representative to the House of Representatives from the time its congressional district was carved out of the fourth congressional district of Bulacan.

Known as the Brain and Father of Cityhood and the Man behind San Jose del Monte's Golden Age of Governance, Hon. Eduardo V. Roquero received numerous recognitions and awards such as Most Outstanding Mayor of the Philippines in 2008 and Most Outstanding Congressman of the Philippines in 2006. A year after his death in 2009, he was given the "Dangal ng Lahing San Jose Award" which is the highest form of recognition to a public servant.

Political offices
Preceded by Reynaldo A. Villano	Mayor of San Jose del Monte; 1988–1992	Succeeded by Reynaldo A. Villano
Preceded by Reynaldo A. Villano	Mayor of San Jose del Monte; 1998–2004	Succeeded by Angelito M. Sarmiento
Preceded by Angelito M. Sarmiento	Mayor of San Jose del Monte; 2007 - 2009	Succeeded by Reynaldo S. San Pedro (acting)
House of Representatives of the Philippines
New district	Representative, Lone District of San Jose del Monte; 2004–2007	Succeeded by Arthur Robes
