= Cocofed =

Philippine coconut producers association

- — Philippine partylist —
- Full name: Philippine Coconut Producers Federation, Inc.
- Abbreviation: Cocofed
- Sector(s) represented: Coconut farmers
- Founded: 1947; 78 years ago
- Delisted: March 20, 2018

Philippine Coconut Producers Federation, Inc. or Cocofed is an association for coconut producers based in Makati. They historically had party-list representation in the House of Representatives of the Philippines.

== Background ==
The Philippine Coconut Producers Federation, Inc. (Cocofed) was established in 1947 as a non-stock, non-profit organization of coconut farmers and producers.

The group has been claiming ownership over the sequestered Coco Levy funds for the development of the coconut industry.

== As a party-list group ==
Cocofed is among the first candidate groups for party-list representation in the House of Representatives , taking part at the 1998 election winning a sole seat. Emerito Calderon filled the seat.

The group made a bid to at least retain a seat in the 2001 election. It was however disqualified by the Commission on Elections (Comelec) due to being "adjunct of the government" which was later reversed by the Supreme Court in a decision on June 25, 2003. Calderon assumed his position again.

They lost the seat following the 2004 election, although they regain a place in the lower house after the 2007 election. Domingo Espina belately filled the seat in 2010.

The group lost the seat again in the 2010 election. In the 2013 election, Cocofed was disqualified by the Comelec due only submitting two names as its nominees which does not satisfy the minimum of five nominees requirement. They would not have won a seat as they only received around 100,000 votes. Cocofed did not participate in the 2016 election and its registration as a partylist organization was cancelled in March 20, 2018.

== Representatives to Congress ==
Period	Representative
11th Congress; 1998–2001	Emerito Calderon
12th Congress; 2001–2004	Emerito Calderon (from 2003)
13th Congress; 2004–2007	Out of Congress
14th Congress; 2007–2010	Domingo Espina (2010)
Note: A party-list group, can win a maximum of three seats in the House of Representatives.
