= Raul del Mar =

Filipino politician (1941–2020)

The Honorable Raul del Mar
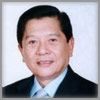
- Official portrait, 2004

Member of the Philippine House of Representatives from Cebu City's 1st district
- In office June 30, 2013 – November 16, 2020
- Preceded by: Rachel del Mar
- Succeeded by: Rachel del Mar
- In office June 30, 2001 – June 30, 2010
- Preceded by: Raoul del Mar
- Succeeded by: Rachel del Mar
- In office June 30, 1987 – June 30, 1998
- Preceded by: Post created
- Succeeded by: Raoul del Mar

Deputy Speaker of the Philippine House of Representatives for Visayas
- In office November 8, 2004 – June 30, 2010

Personal details
- Born: Raul Veloso del Mar; March 20, 1941 Cebu City, Cebu, Commonwealth of the Philippines
- Died: November 16, 2020 (aged 79) Manila, Philippines
- Party: Panaghiusa (local, 1987-1988); BOPK (local, 1988-2020); Liberal (national, 2013–2020)
- Other political affiliations: Lakas-Kampi (1995–2010); LDP (1988–1995); Lakas ng Bansa (1987–1988)
- Spouse: Melanie C. Borromeo
- Children: 3, including Rannie and Cutie
- Relatives: Del Mar family
- Education: University of San Carlos (B.A.); Ateneo Law School (LL.B.)
- Occupation: Politician
- Profession: Lawyer

Raul Veloso del Mar (March 20, 1941 – November 16, 2020) was a Filipino politician and lawyer who served nine terms as the Representative of Cebu City's 1st district three times: from 1987 to 1998, from 2001 to 2010, and from 2013 until his death in 2020.

== Education ==
He was a graduate of the University of San Carlos and the Ateneo Law School (1963).

== Electoral history ==
Del Mar ran in a total of ten elections from 1987 to 2019, winning every election after his failed first attempt. More detailed lists of candidates and votes in each election may be found in most of the respective election's articles.

Electoral history of Raul V. Del Mar
Year	Office Constituency	Party (Note: Filipino local politicians more commonly campaign in their constituencies based on local parties and alliances, rather than on their national parties. It is also common for local parties and alliances to switch affiliations to another national party, especially following the election of a new President.)		Main opponent (Note: The listed main opponent is either the victorious candidate (in an election defeat) or the second-ranked candidate (in a victory).)		Votes for Del Mar					Result	Ref
Year	Office Constituency	Local	National	Name	Party	Total	%	±%	Mgn.	P.	Result	Ref
1984	Assemblyman; Cebu City	Independent		—N/a		35,003	—N/a	—N/a	—N/a	6th	Lost	
1987	Representative; Cebu City 1st district	Panaghiusa	LABAN	—N/a		120,704	41.3%	—N/a	—N/a	1st	Won	
1992	Representative; Cebu City 1st district	— (Note: Sources contradict each other as to Del Mar's local political affiliation during the 1992 elections; Teehankee (2001) writes that Del Mar ran for re-election in 1992 under the same party as 1987 (Panaghiusa) before shifting parties for the 1995 elections, while more recent local news sources reporting on Del Mar's death in 2020 either directly state or quote Tomas Osmeña as saying that Del mar was affiliated with BOPK since 1987 or 1988.)	LDP	—N/a		158,849	—N/a	—N/a	—N/a	1st	Won	
1995	Representative; Cebu City 1st district	BOPK	Lakas	Unopposed		169,512	—N/a	—N/a	—N/a	1st	Won	
1998	Term-limited for Representative, did not run (Note: In 2001, BOPK fielded Del Mar's son Raoul "Rannie" del Mar, who succeeded his father for one term.)											
2001	Representative; Cebu City 1st district	BOPK	PROMDI	Florencio Villarin	Independent	56,084	89.94%	—N/a	—N/a	1st	Won	
2004	Representative; Cebu City 1st district	BOPK	Lakas-CMD	Danilo Fernan	KUSUG	—N/a	—N/a	—N/a	—N/a	1st	Won	
2007	Representative; Cebu City 1st district	BOPK	Lakas-CMD	Mary Ann De los Santos	KUSUG	122,988	—N/a	—N/a	—N/a	1st	Won	
2010	Term-limited for Representative, did not run (Note: In 2010, BOPK fielded Del Mar's daughter Raoul "Cutie" del Mar, who succeeded her father for one term.)											
2013	Representative; Cebu City 1st district	BOPK	Liberal	Anabelle Rama	BARUG	133,149	74.55%	—N/a	54.55%	1st	Won	
2016	Representative; Cebu City 1st district	BOPK	Liberal	Alvin Garcia	BARUG	134,940	62.26%	-12.29%	34.66%	1st	Won	
2019	Representative; Cebu City 1st district	BOPK	Liberal	Richard Yap	BARUG	135,528	61.34%	-0.92%	24.42%	1st	Won	
Died in office on November 16, 2020

== Personal life ==
Del Mar is a member of the Del Mar family, an old political clan originating from the town of Parian during the Spanish colonial era before its incorporation into the Municipality of Cebu (the future Cebu City) under American colonial rule.

He was married to Melanie Chan Borromeo, with whom he had three children: doctor Raoul ("Rannie"), Rachel ("Cutie"), and Ryan. Rannie, a pediatrician now based in California, served a single term in Congress from 1998 to 2001, after their father was term-limited following the end of his third term. Cutie likewise served in Congress from 2010 to 2013 after Del Mar was once again limited after his sixth term, and succeeded her father again from 2022 up to the present following his death in 2020.

== Death ==
Del Mar died on November 16, 2020, at the age of 79.

== Ancestry ==
Ancestors of Raul V. del Mar

8. Sebastian S. del Mar
4. Mariano C. del Mar
9. Fernanda Castro
2. José María L. del Mar Sr.
10. Pablo Lasala
5. Juanita R. Lasala
11. Maria Rosales
1. Raul V. del Mar
12. Nicasio Chiong Veloso
6. Potenciano R. Chiong Veloso
13. Genoveva Visitación Rosales
3. Rosario C. Veloso
14. Leodegario Ricablanca
7. Damasa G. Ricablanca
15. Maria Gusman

House of Representatives of the Philippines
Preceded by post created	Member of the Philippine House of Representatives from 1st District of Cebu City; 1987–1998	Succeeded by Raoul del Mar
Preceded by Raoul del Mar	Member of the Philippine House of Representatives from 1st District of Cebu City; 2001–2010	Succeeded by Rachel del Mar
Preceded by Rachel del Mar	Member of the Philippine House of Representatives from 1st District of Cebu City; 2013–2020	Succeeded by Rachel del Mar
