= 2001 Philippine House of Representatives elections =

19th Philippine House of Representatives elections

- May 14, 2001

All 261 seats in the House of Representatives (including underhangs) 130 seats needed for a majority
- Congressional district elections
- All 209 seats from congressional districts
| Party | Seats | +/– |
|---|---|---|
| Lakas | 79 | −32 |
| NPC | 42 | +33 |
| LDP | 21 | +21 |
| Liberal | 19 | +4 |
| PMP | 4 | +4 |
| PROMDI | 2 | −1 |
| Aksyon | 2 | +1 |
| PDP–Laban | 2 | +2 |
| Reporma–LM | 2 | −2 |
| KAMPI | 1 | +1 |
| KBL | 1 | +1 |
| PDSP | 1 | +1 |
| PPC | 1 | +1 |
| Others | 32 | +26 |
This lists parties that won seats. See the complete results below.
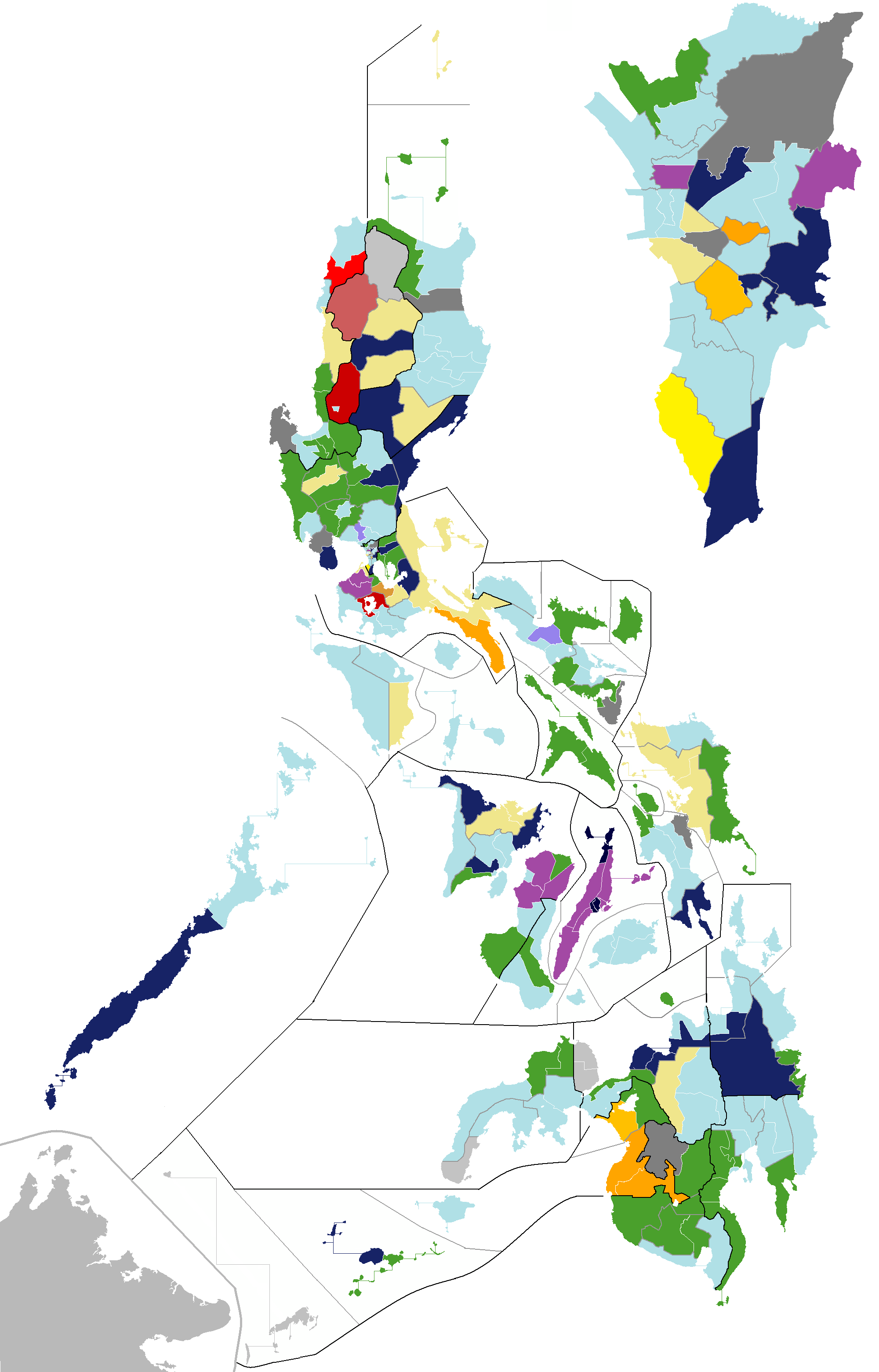
- Party-list election
- All 52 seats under the party-list system
| Party | Vote % | Seats | +/– |
|---|---|---|---|
| Bayan Muna | 26.19 | 3 | +3 |
| APEC | 12.30 | 3 | +1 |
| Akbayan | 5.79 | 2 | +1 |
| BUTIL | 5.06 | 2 | +1 |
| CIBAC | 4.96 | 2 | +2 |
| Buhay | 4.46 | 2 | +2 |
| Anak Mindanao | 3.86 | 1 | +1 |
| ABA | 3.71 | 1 | 0 |
| COCOFED | 3.51 | 1 | 0 |
| PM | 3.32 | 1 | +1 |
| Sanlakas | 2.32 | 1 | 0 |
| Abanse! Pinay | 2.07 | 1 | +1 |
This lists parties that won seats. See the complete results below.
| Speaker before | Speaker after |
|---|---|
| Feliciano Belmonte Jr. Lakas | Jose de Venecia Jr. Lakas |

Elections for the House of Representatives of the Philippines were held on May 14, 2001. This was the next election succeeding the events of the 2001 EDSA Revolution that deposed Joseph Estrada from the presidency; his vice president, Gloria Macapagal Arroyo became president, and her party, Lakas, and by extension the People Power Coalition (PPC), dominated the midterm elections winning majority of the seats in the Senate and in the House of Representatives.

The elected representatives served in the 12th Congress from 2001 to 2004.

== Electoral system ==
The House of Representatives shall have not more than 250 members, unless otherwise fixed by law, of which 20% shall be elected via the party-list system, while the rest are elected via congressional districts.

In this election, there are 209 seats voted via first-past-the-post in single-member districts. Each province, and a city with a population of 250,000, is guaranteed a seat, with more populous provinces and cities divided into two or more districts.

Congress has the power of redistricting three years after each census.

As there are 209 congressional districts, there shall be 52 seats available under the party-list system. In 2000, the Supreme Court ruled the 2%–4%–6% method of allocating seats as unconstitutional. It then devised a new way of allocating the seats. It held the 2% electoral threshold for winning a guaranteed seat as constitutional. Next, the court ruled that the first-placed party should always have more seats than the other parties, and that the 2%–4%–6% method will only be used for the first-placed party. As for parties that got 2% of the vote but did not have the most votes, they will automatically have one more seat, then any extra seats will be determined via dividing their votes to the number of votes of the party with the most votes, then the quotient will be multiplied by the number of seats the party with the most votes has. The product, disregarding decimals (it is not rounded), will be the number of seats a party will get.

== Redistricting ==
Reapportioning (redistricting) the number of seats is either via national reapportionment three years after the release of every census, or via piecemeal redistricting for every province or city. National reapportionment has not occurred since the 1987 constitution took effect, and aside from piecemeal redistricting, apportionment has been based on the constitution's ordinance, which was in turn based on the 1980 census.

Three new districts were created in Valenzuela, and Compostela Valley was created from Davao del Norte. The creation of Zamboanga Sibugay province from Zamboanga del Sur did not increase the number of districts.

=== Changes from the previous Congress ===
- Creation of Compostela Valley province
  - The 1st and 2nd districts of Davao del Norte becomes the new province of Compostela Valley, as its 1st and 2nd districts
  - The remaining Davao del Norte's 3rd district was redistricted, becoming the new 1st and 2nd districts .
  - Enacted into law as Republic Act No. 8470.
  - Approved in a plebiscite on March 7, 1998.
- Division of Valenzuela's at-large congressional district to two districts
  - Valenzuela's northwestern barangays becomes the 1st district.
  - The southeastern barangays becomes the 2nd district.
  - Enacted into law as Republic Act No. 8526.
  - Approved in a plebiscite on December 30, 1998.

=== Changes from the outgoing Congress ===
- Creation of Zamboanga Sibugay province
  - The municipalities included in Zamboanga del Sur's 3rd district becomes the at-large district of the newly created province of Zamboanga Sibugay.
  - Zamboanga del Sur's 1st and 2nd districts were left intact.
  - Enacted into law as Republic Act No. 8973.
  - Approved in a plebiscite held on February 22, 2001.

== Results ==
=== District elections ===
| Party | Seats | +/– |
|---|---|---|
| Lakas–NUCD–UMDP | 79 | −32 |
| Nationalist People's Coalition | 42 | +33 |
| Laban ng Demokratikong Pilipino | 21 | +21 |
| Liberal Party | 19 | +4 |
| Alayon Alang sa Kalambu-an ng Kalinaw | 4 | New |
| Partido ng Masang Pilipino | 4 | +4 |
| Nationalist People's Coalition–INA | 3 | New |
| United Negros Alliance | 3 | New |
| PROMDI | 3 | −1 |
| Aksyon Demokratiko | 2 | +1 |
| Partido Magdalo | 2 | New |
| PDP–Laban | 2 | +2 |
| Partido para sa Demokratikong Reporma–Lapiang Manggagawa | 2 | −2 |
| Barug Alang sa Kauswagan ug Demokrasya–Alayon Alang sa Kalambu-an ng Kalinaw | 1 | New |
| Kabayani | 1 | New |
| Kabalikat ng Malayang Pilipino | 1 | +1 |
| Kilusang Bagong Lipunan | 1 | +1 |
| Laban ng Demokratikong Pilipino–Nationalist People's Coalition | 1 | New |
| Liping Kalookan | 1 | New |
| Nationalist People's Coalition–Achievers with Integrity Movement | 1 | New |
| Nationalist People's Coalition–United Negros Alliance | 1 | New |
| Partido Demokratiko Sosyalista ng Pilipinas | 1 | +1 |
| People Power Coalition | 1 | New |
| Not indicated and undeclared | 5 | +1 |
| Independent | 8 | +6 |
| Party-list seats (Note: Only 16 were seated in the party-list election.) | 52 | +1 |
| Total | 261 | +3 |
Source: COMELEC (via Wayback Machine NCR, Luzon, Visayas, Mindanao)

=== Party-list election ===
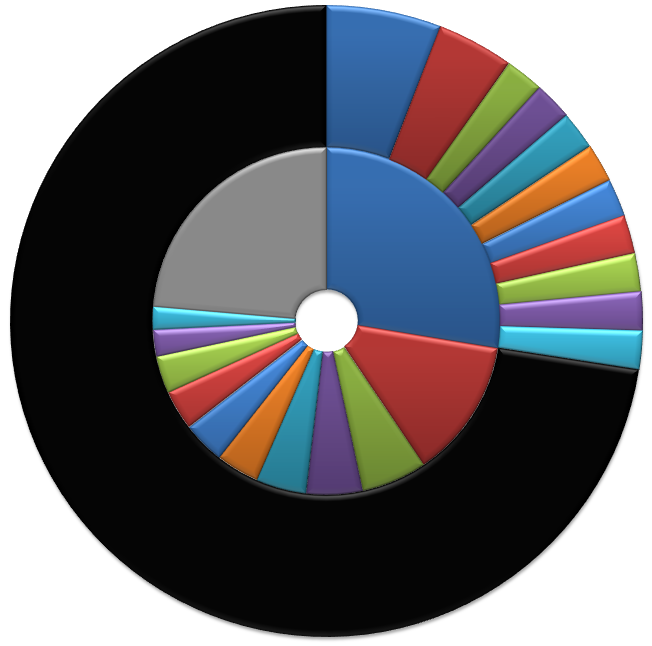
Result of the Philippine House of Representatives party-list election. Proportion of votes (inner ring) as compared to proportion of seats (outer ring) of the political parties. Parties that did not win any seat are represented by a gray pie slice, unfilled seats due to the 3-seat cap and 2% threshold are denoted by a black slice.

| Party | Votes | % | Seats |
|---|---|---|---|
| Bayan Muna | 1,708,253 | 26.19 | 3 |
| Association of Philippine Electric Cooperatives | 802,060 | 12.30 | 3 |
| Akbayan | 377,852 | 5.79 | 2 |
| Luzon Farmers Party | 330,282 | 5.06 | 2 |
| Citizens' Battle Against Corruption | 323,810 | 4.96 | 2 |
| Buhay Hayaan Yumabong | 290,760 | 4.46 | 2 |
| Anak Mindanao | 252,051 | 3.86 | 1 |
| Alyansang Bayanihan ng mga Magsasaka, Manggagawang Bukid at Mangingisda | 242,199 | 3.71 | 1 |
| Philippine Coconut Producers Federation | 229,165 | 3.51 | 1 |
| Partido ng Manggagawa | 216,823 | 3.32 | 1 |
| Sanlakas | 151,017 | 2.32 | 1 |
| Abanse! Pinay | 135,211 | 2.07 | 1 |
| Adhikain at Kilusan ng Ordinaryong Tao para sa Lupa, Pabahay, Hanapbuhay at Kaunlaran | 126,012 | 1.93 | 0 |
| Alagad | 117,161 | 1.80 | 0 |
| Senior Citizens/Elderly Sectoral Party | 106,496 | 1.63 | 0 |
| All Trade Union Congress of the Philippines | 103,273 | 1.58 | 0 |
| Maritime Party | 98,946 | 1.52 | 0 |
| Ang Bagong Bayani-OFW Labor Party | 97,085 | 1.49 | 0 |
| Aniban ng mga Magsasaka, Mangingisda at Manggagawa sa Agrikultura Katipunan | 65,735 | 1.01 | 0 |
| Alyansa ng Nagkakaisang Kabataan ng Sambayanan Para sa Kaunlaran | 63,312 | 0.97 | 0 |
| Alyansa ng may Kapansanan sa Pilipinas | 54,925 | 0.84 | 0 |
| Mindanao Federation of Small Coconut Farmers Organization | 49,914 | 0.77 | 0 |
| Womenpower | 46,831 | 0.72 | 0 |
| Aggrupation and Alliance Farmers and Fisherfolks of the Phils. | 43,882 | 0.67 | 0 |
| All Workers Alliance Trade Unions | 42,149 | 0.65 | 0 |
| National Confederation of Tricycle Operators and Driver's Association of the Phils. | 38,898 | 0.60 | 0 |
| National Federation of Small Coconut Farmers Organization | 37,470 | 0.57 | 0 |
| Tribal Communities Association of the Philippines | 35,807 | 0.55 | 0 |
| Pilipinong May Kapansanan | 32,151 | 0.49 | 0 |
| Veterans Care and Welfare Organization | 31,694 | 0.49 | 0 |
| Union of the Filipino Overseas Workers | 29,400 | 0.45 | 0 |
| Pilipino Workers Party | 24,182 | 0.37 | 0 |
| Democratic Alliance | 24,029 | 0.37 | 0 |
| Philippine Association of Retired Persons | 23,297 | 0.36 | 0 |
| Alliance of Retired Postal Employees and Senior Citizens | 22,497 | 0.34 | 0 |
| Agrarian Reform Beneficiaries Association | 22,345 | 0.34 | 0 |
| Federation of Jeepney Operators and Drivers Association of the Phils. | 21,335 | 0.33 | 0 |
| Gabay ng Manggagawang Pilipino Party | 17,777 | 0.27 | 0 |
| Alternative Approaches of Settlers Advocacy for the Holistic Advancement of the Nation Party | 16,787 | 0.26 | 0 |
| Alliance for Youth Solidarity | 15,871 | 0.24 | 0 |
| Party for Overseas Workers and Empowerment and Re-Integration | 13,050 | 0.20 | 0 |
| Kilos Kabataang Pilipino | 11,170 | 0.17 | 0 |
| Kaloob-Ka Isang Loob para sa Marangal na Paninirahan | 9,137 | 0.14 | 0 |
| Alyansa ng Mga Mamamayan at Magdaragat Sa Lawa ng Laguna | 7,882 | 0.12 | 0 |
| Partido Katutubong Pilipino | 6,602 | 0.10 | 0 |
| Development Foundation of the Philippines | 6,600 | 0.10 | 0 |
| Total | 6,523,185 | 100.00 | 20 |
| Valid votes | 6,523,185 | 22.13 | |
| Invalid/blank votes | 22,951,124 | 77.87 | |
| Total votes | 29,474,309 | 100.00 | |
| Registered voters/turnout | 36,271,782 | 81.26 | |
Source: Supreme Court (G.R. No. 147589); COMELEC (Canvass report (archived))

Invalid votes included votes from the following disqualified party-lists:

- Mamamayan Ayaw sa Droga: 1,515,693
- Veterans Federation Party: 580,781
- Abag Promdi: 422,430
- Nationalist People's Coalition: 385,151
- Lakas–NUCD–UMDP: 329,237
- Laban ng Demokratikong Pilipino: 308,639
- Cooperative Natcco Network Party: 226,322
- National Confederation of Irrigators Association: 223,996
- Asosasyon para sa Kaunlaran ng Industriya ng Aklat: 210,052
- The True Marcos Loyalist (For God, Country and People) Association of the Philippines: 172,666
- Chamber of Real Estate and Builders Association: 160,255
- Bigkis Pinoy Foundation: 155,941
- Aksyon Demokratiko: 135,156
- Green Philippines Foundation: 128,589
- Partido ng Masang Pilipino: 120,224
- Ang Lakas ng Bagong Kooperatiba: 111,463
- Partido ng Maralitang Pilipino-Pinatubo Party: 111,353
- Rebolusyonaryong Alyansang Makabansa: 106,637
- Bagong Bayani Organization: 104,791
- Bayan na Nagtataguyod ng Demokratikong Ideologiya at Layunin: 104,467
- Kabataan ng Masang Pilipino: 102,606
- Aarangkada ang mga Handa Oras-Oras para sa Bayan: 101,751
- Philippine Medical Association: 94,888
- Alliance to Alleviate the Socio Economic and Social Order: 94,212
- PDP–Laban: 90,245
- Cooperative Union of the Philippines: 88,444
- Partido Demokratiko Sosyalista ng Pilipinas: 88,187
- Atin: 86,385
- Volunteers Against Crime and Corruption: 78,486
- Association of Builders Consultants and Designers: 74,656
- Liberal Party: 73,784
- Citizen's Drugwatch Foundation: 71,046
- Alay sa Bayan para sa Kalayaan at Demokrasya: 67,741
- Asosasyon ng mga Taga Insurance sa Pilipinas: 67,008
- Ang Lakas ng Overseas Contract Workers: 66,218
- Kabalikat ng Bayan Party: 64,644
- National Federation of Sugar Planters: 64,574
- Bantay Bayan Foundation Party: 59,208
- Abante Kilusang Kooperatiba sa Gitnang Luzon: 58,023
- Green Philippines: 54,721
- Philippine Association of Detective and Protective Agency Operators: 51,991
- Alliance for Greater Achievements in Peace and Prosperity: 51,801
- Alyansa ng Kooberatibang Pangkabuhayan Party: 50,436
- National Alliance for Democracy Party: 49,147
- People Power Party: 48,835
- Philippine Technological Council: 48,008
- Philippine Local Autonomy Movement: 43,725
- Professional Criminologist Association of the Philippines: 43,172
- Citizens' Movement for Justice, Economy, Environment and Peace: 41,423
- Aalagahan Ang Ating Kalikasan Nationwide: 35,626
- Confederation of Non-Stock Savings and Loan Association: 29,477
- Consumers Union of the Philippines: 29,415
- Partido para sa Demokratikong Reporma: 29,359
- People's Progressive Alliance for Peace and Good Government Towards Alleviation of Poverty and Social Advancement: 28,877
- Ahonbayan: 28,373
- A Peaceful Organization Leadership, Friendship, Service Movement: 27,104
- Angat: 27,017
- Sama-Sama Kaya Natin 'To Foundation: 26,846
- Philippine Dental Association: 26,634
- Pusyon (Bisaya) Pilipino: 26,037
- Social Justice Society: 25,213
- Citizens Anti-Crime Assistant Group: 24,825
- Asa at Samahan ng Karaniwang Pilipino: 23,163
- Abay Pamilya Foundation: 22,127
- United Architect of the Philippine: 22,125
- Businessman and Enterpreneurs Association: 22,034
- People's Reform Party: 20,663
- Coalition for Consumer Protection and Welfare: 20,247
- Rizalist Party: 19,266
- Naional Urban Poor Assembly: 18,670
- Alliance for Meritocracy: 18,456
- Balikatan sa Kabuhayan Buhay Coalition: 18,196
- Bantay Dagat: 18,041
- Confederation of Homeowner's Association for Reforms in Governance and Environment: 17,749
- Port Users Confederation: 17,494
- Laban para sa Kapayapaan, Katarungan, at Kaunlaran: 17,282
- Bonding Idealism for National Human Initiative: 16,877
- Katipunan ng mg Bantay Bayan ng Pilipinas: 16,001
- Federation of Sons and Daughters of Philippine Veterans.: 14,711
- Prime Movers for Peace and Progress: 14,369
- Progressive Alliance of Citizens for Democracy: 13,411
- Council of Agricultural Producers: 13,276
- Tapat Foundation: 13,077
- Alliance for Alleviation of National Governance and Trust Party: 12,971
- Ang Ipaglaban Mo Foundation: 12,195
- Philippine Mine Safety and Environment Association: 11,932
- Bicol Saro Party: 11,431
- Aabante Ka Pilipinas Party: 10,800
- Philippine People's Parliament: 10,794
- Kilusan Tungo sa Pambansang Tangkilikan: 10,637
- Sports and Health Advancement Foundation: 10,610
- Citizens Foundation for the Prevention of Crimes and Injustices: 10,306
- Nacionalista Party: 9,977
- Sandigang Maralita: 9,920
- Oneway Printing Technical Foundation: 9,666
- Philippine Jury Movement: 8,847
- Alternative Action: 8,143
- Democratic Workers Party: 7,907
- Security United League Nationwide Guards: 7,677
- Organisasyong Kaugnayan Nasyonal sa Pag-unlad: 7,298
- Pambansang Sangguniang Katipunan ng Barangay Kagawad ng Pilipinas.: 7,112
- National Council for Community Organizer: 5,975
- Nationwide Association of Consumers, Inc.: 5,568
- Luzviminda Economic Dev't. Foundation, Inc.: 5,328
- Tindog para han Kabubuwason para han Waraynon: 4,815
- Federation of Land Reform Farmers of the Philippines: 4,786
- Katribu Mindanao, Inc.: 4,231
- Demokratikong Ugnayang Tapat Sa Sambayanan: 3,966
- Katarungan sa Bayan Tagapagtanggol ng Sambayanan: 3,899
- Pambansang Samahang Lingkod ng Bayan: 3,221
- Go Go Philippines Movement: 3,151
- Philippine Reformist Society: 2,757
- Gabaybayan: 2,722
- Aluhai Neighborhood Association, Inc.: 2,567
- Organized Support for the Movement to Enhance the National Agenda: 1,676

== See also ==
- 12th Congress of the Philippines
- Sunshine Coalition

== Bibliography ==
- Paras, Corazon L. (2000). The Presidents of the Senate of the Republic of the Philippines. ISBN 971-8832-24-6.
- Pobre, Cesar P. (2000). Philippine Legislature 100 Years. ISBN 971-92245-0-9.
- Teehankee, Julio. "Electoral Politics in the Philippines" (PDF). quezon.ph.
