= Mayor of San Jose del Monte =

Head of local government of San Jose del Monte, Bulacan, Philippines

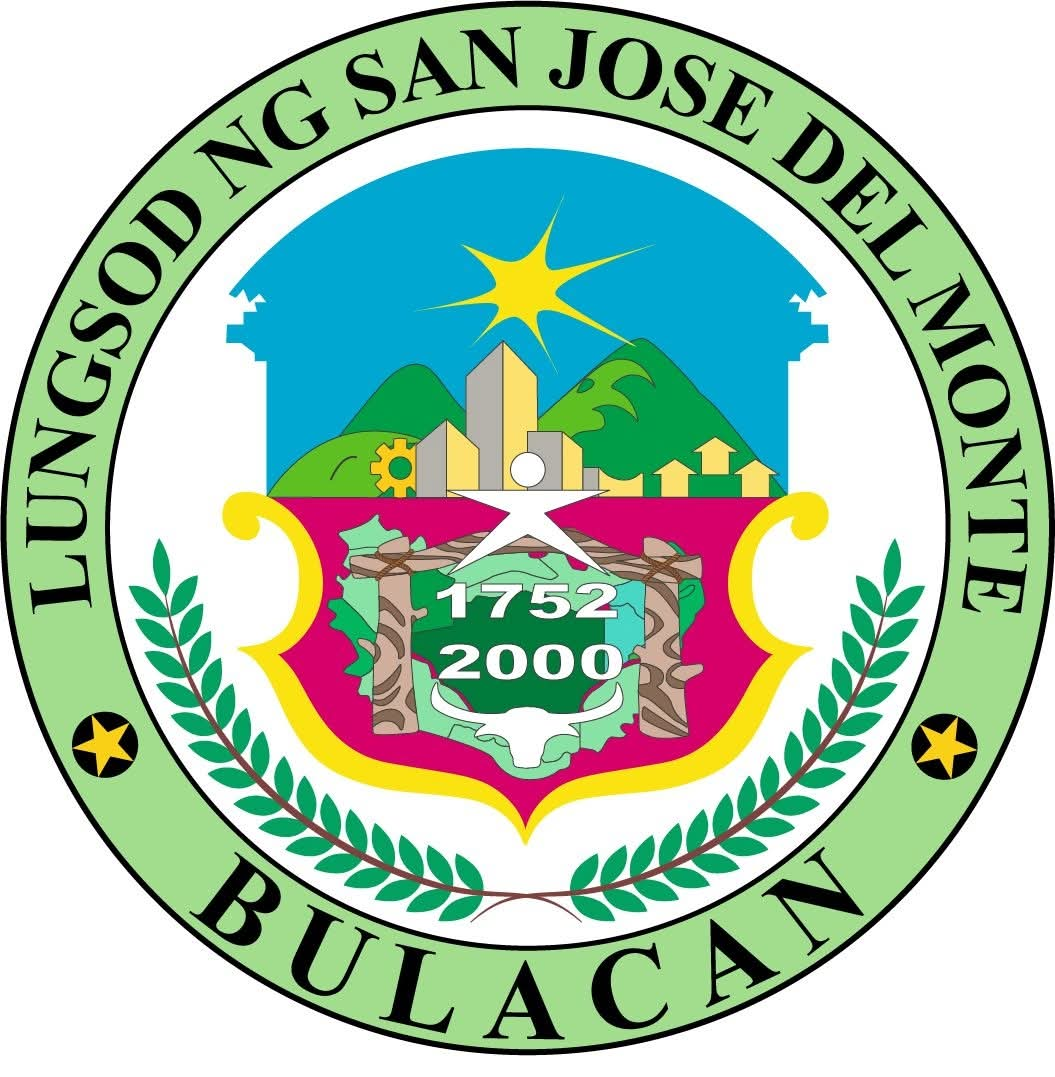
- Seal of San Jose del Monte

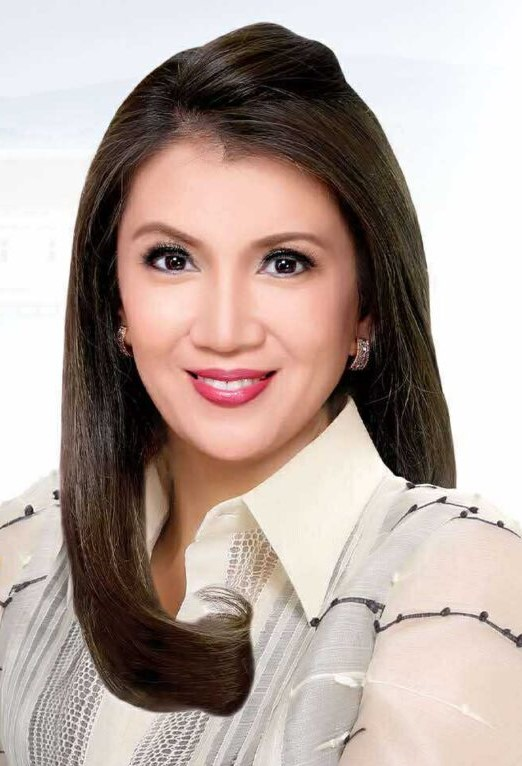
- Incumbent; Florida Robes since June 30, 2025
- Appointer: Elected via popular vote
- Term length: 3 years
- Inaugural holder: Ceriaco Gallardo
- Formation: 1918

The mayor of San Jose del Monte (Filipino: Punong Lungsod ng San Jose del Monte) is the head of the local government of the city who elected to three year terms. The Mayor is also the executive head and leads the city's departments in executing the city ordinances and improving public services. The city mayor is restricted to three consecutive terms, totaling nine years, although a mayor can be elected again after an interruption of one term.

The current mayor is Florida Robes since June 30, 2025.

== List of mayors of San Jose del Monte ==
#	Image	Municipal Mayors	Term
Municipality of San Jose del Monte, Bulacan (1918–2000)
1		Ceriaco Gallardo	1918 - 1921
2		Sinforoso Avena	1922 - 1924
3		Felicano Avanceña	1925 - 1930
4		Quirico Villano	1931 - 1936
5		Felicano Avanceña	1937 - 1939
6		Jose Avanceña Appointed Mayor	1940 - 1941
7		Adriano Capa	1942 - 1943
8		Ricardo Marcelo (Note: Caretaker of Mayorship)	1943 - 1944
9		Bonifacio Inocencio	1945
10		Jose Avanceña	1945 - 1946
11		Felicano Avanceña	1946 - 1955
12		Eusebio Aguirre	1956 - 1963
13		Quirico Villano	1964 - 1967
14		Constantino Aguirre	1968 - 1973
15		Jose Guballa	1973 - 1980
16		Guillermo Robes	1980 - 1986
17		Reynaldo A. Villano	1986 - 1988
18		Eduardo V. Roquero M.D.	1988 - 1992
19		Reynaldo A. Villano	1992 - 1995
20		Eduardo V. Roquero M.D.	1995 - 2000
City of San Jose del Monte, Bulacan (2000–Present)
20		Eduardo V. Roquero M.D.	2000 - 2004
21		Angelito M. Sarmiento	2004 - 2007
22		Eduardo V. Roquero M.D.	2007 - 2009
–		Reynaldo S. San Pedro (Note: Acting Mayor)	2009
–		Angelito M. Sarmiento	2009 - 2010
23		Reynaldo S. San Pedro	2010 - 2016
24		Arthur B. Robes	2016 – 2025
25		Florida P. Robes	2025 – present

== See also ==
- San Jose del Monte
- San Jose del Monte's at-large congressional district
- Angelito M. Sarmiento
- Eduardo V. Roquero M.D.
