= Raoul del Mar =

Filipino physician and former politician

Member of the Philippine House of Representatives from Cebu City's 1st district
- In office June 30, 1998 – June 30, 2001
- Preceded by: Raul del Mar
- Succeeded by: Raul del Mar

Personal details
- Born: Raoul Borromeo del Mar; February 10, 1965 (age 61) Cebu City, Philippines
- Citizenship: Filipino
- Party: Lakas–CMD; PROMDI; BOPK (local; 1997–2001)
- Other political affiliations: LAMP (1998)
- Children: 2
- Parents: Raul V. del Mar (father); Melanie C. Borromeo (mother)
- Relatives: Del Mar family, including sister Rachel
- Education: Cebu Doctors' College (MD)
- Profession: Physician, politician
- Nickname: Rannie

Raoul "Rannie" Borromeo del Mar (born February 10, 1965) is a Filipino physician and former politician. He served as the representative for the 1st district of Cebu City from 1998 to 2001.

== Early life and education ==
Raoul was born to Raul del Mar and Melanie Borromeo del Mar. He has a younger sister, Rachel, and younger brother, Ryan. He completed his medical studies at then Cebu Doctors' College and was able to do externships in various Los Angeles and Maryland hospitals.

== Career ==
As Raoul practiced his medical profession, he was accepted for residency at the State University of New York. He finished his residency at University Hospital Rainbow Babies and Children's Hospital, Cleveland, Ohio. He later served as chief of staff from 1997 to 1998 for his father who was then serving as representative for the 1st district of Cebu City.

With his father limited to three consecutive terms, Raoul was thrust into the political scene. "Their being the congressman's relative is only incidental. They are academically qualified, in fact more qualified than we are. We should not make a big issue out of it," the older del Mar said in defending his decision to field his son for public office.

In the 1998 elections, he ran under the banner of Probinsya Muna Development Initiative (PROMDI) and was elected unopposed to succeed his father as the district's new representative. He joined the Lapian ng Masang Pilipino (LAMP) of then President Joseph Estrada after the said elections. However, he was among those purged by then Senator John Henry Osmeña, in his capacity as LAMP Vice President for the Visayas, for being identified with PROMDI. He was one of the critics of the Estrada administration's push on amending the 1987 constitution. He later affiliated himself with Lakas–CMD and only served a single term until which he was succeeded by his father who went on to serve for another nine consecutive years.

He is currently working as a physician based in Rocklin, California. He is married to his high school sweetheart, Maika Abad, and has two children, Veronica and Rance.

House of Representatives of the Philippines
Preceded by Raul del Mar	Member of the Philippine House of Representatives from 1st District of Cebu City; 1998–2001	Succeeded by Raul del Mar
