= Butil Farmers Party =

- Founded: 2001
- Ideology: Agrarianism
- Political position: Centre-left
- Colors: Green

The Butil Farmers Party (Butil), formerly the Luzon Farmers Party, is a political party in Luzon, Philippines. Butil is the electoral wing of the National Farmers Supreme Council (SANDUGO).

In the 2004 elections for the House of Representatives, the party got 429,259 votes (3.3742%) and one seat (Benjamin A. Cruz). In the previous congress, the party had two seats, Benjamin A. Cruz and Leonila V. Chavez ('Ka Nellie').

The party supported the candidacy of Gloria Macapagal Arroyo in the 2004 election.

Cruz died on October 15, 2004. His seat was filled by Chavez. In the 14 May 2007 election, the party won one seat in the nationwide party-list vote.

== Electoral performance ==
Election	Votes	%	Seats	1st representative	2nd representative	3rd representative
1998	215,643	2.36%	1	Benjamin Cruz	—	—
2001	330,282	2.18%	2	Benjamin Cruz	Leonila Chavez	—
2004	429,259	3.37%	1	Benjamin Cruz (Note: Died in office); Leonila Chavez	—	—
2007	409,160	2.57%	2	Leonila Chavez	Agapito Guanlao	
2010	506,703	1.67%	1	Agapito Guanlao	—	—
2013	438,601	1.60%	1	Agapito Guanlao	—	—
2016	395,011	1.22%	1	Cecilia Leonila Chavez	—	—
2019	163,927	0.59%	0	—	—	—
2022	87,305	0.24%	0	—	—	—
