= Eriberto Loreto =

Filipino politician (1931–2005)

Eriberto V. Loreto
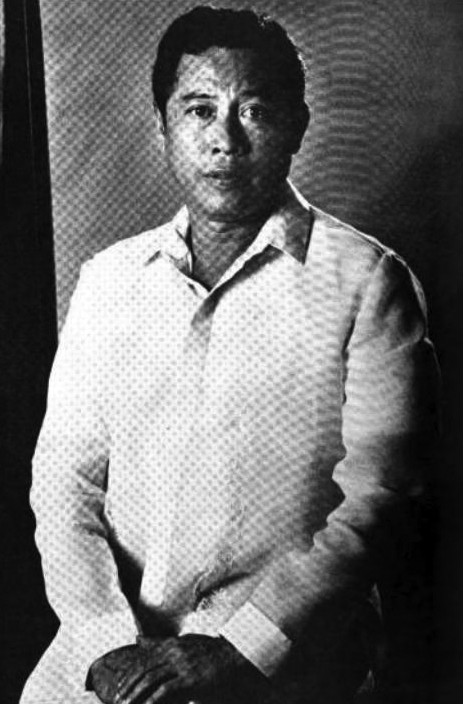

Member of Philippine House of Representatives from Leyte's 5th district
- In office June 30, 1987 – June 30, 1998
- Preceded by: Vacant (last held by Alberto T. Aguja)
- Succeeded by: Nene Go

Mayor of Baybay
- In office 1964–1979
- Preceded by: Nello Roa
- Succeeded by: Jose Loreto

Personal details
- Born: Eriberto V. Loreto; September 6, 1931 Baybay, Leyte, Philippine Islands
- Died: June 21, 2005 (aged 73)
- Party: Lakas–CMD
- Other political affiliations: Independent (until 1991); LDP (1991–1992)

Eriberto Veloso Loreto (September 6, 1931– June 21, 2005), also known as the Honorable Berting Loreto, was a Filipino lawyer and politician who served as mayor of Baybay, Leyte and Representative of Leyte's 5th district.
