= Socorro Acosta =

Filipino politician

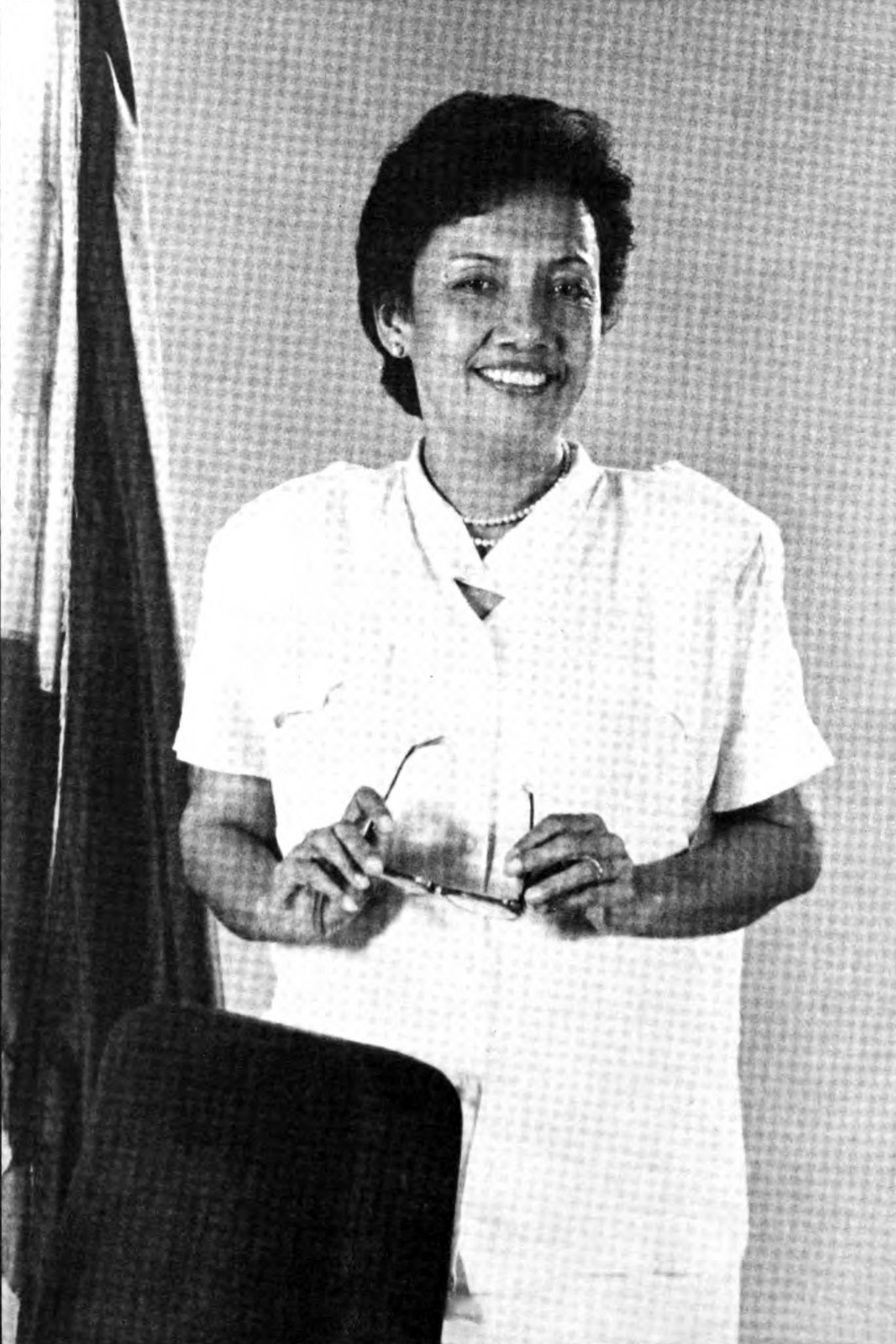
- Socorro Acosta, c. 1988

Member of the House of Representatives from Bukidnon's 1st District
- In office June 30, 1987 – June 30, 1998
- Preceded by: constituency established
- Succeeded by: Nereus Acosta

Personal details
- Born: Ma. Socorro Fama Olaivar; November 17, 1934 Bohol, Philippine Islands
- Died: March 14, 2024 (aged 89) Manolo Fortich, Bukidnon, Philippines
- Party: Bukidnon Paglaum (2016–2024)
- Other political affiliations: Liberal (1987–2016)
- Children: 4, including Nereus and Malou

Ma. Socorro "Coring" Fama Olaivar-Acosta (November 17, 1934 – March 14, 2024) was a Filipino politician who was a member of the House of Representatives who represented Bukidnon's 1st congressional district from 1987 to 1998.

== See also ==
- List of female members of the House of Representatives of the Philippines
- 8th Congress of the Philippines
- 9th Congress of the Philippines
- 10th Congress of the Philippines

House of Representatives of the Philippines
Preceded by constituency established	Member of the House of Representatives from Bukidnon's 1st district 1987–1987	Succeeded by Nereus Acosta
