= Angelito Sarmiento =

Filipino politician

The Honorable Angelito M. Sarmiento

City Mayor of San Jose del Monte City
- In office October 26, 2009 – June 30, 2010
- Vice Mayor: Reynaldo S. San Pedro
- Preceded by: Reynaldo S. San Pedro (Acting)
- Succeeded by: Reynaldo S. San Pedro
- In office June 30, 2004 – June 30, 2007
- Preceded by: Eduardo V. Roquero
- Succeeded by: Eduardo V. Roquero

Presidential Adviser on Agricultural Modernization
- In office 2001–2004

Member of the Philippine House of Representatives from Bulacan's 4th congressional district
- In office June 30, 1992 – March 26, 2001
- Preceded by: Rogaciano Mercado
- Succeeded by: Reylina Nicolas

Personal details
- Born: January 7, 1947 Manila, Philippines
- Died: October 1, 2015 (aged 68) Bulacan, Philippines
- Party: Liberal (2009-2015); Partido Del Pilar (local party)
- Other political affiliations: Lakas-CMD (1992-2009)
- Profession: Businessman

Angelito Monsura Sarmiento (nickname Lito or Boy) (January 7, 1947 – October 1, 2015) was a Filipino politician. A member of Liberal Party/Partido Del Pilar, he served as the mayor of the City of San Jose del Monte, Bulacan from 2004 and 2007 and from 2009 to 2010.

== Political career ==
=== As legislator ===
Sarmiento served three terms as representative of the 4th District of Bulacan from 1992–2001. It was under that term that he authored Republic Act 8797, an act converting the Municipality of San Jose del Monte in the Province of Bulacan into a component city to be known as the City of San Jose del Monte. Three months before the end of his third and final term, he was appointed by Gloria Macapagal Arroyo as Presidential Adviser on Agricultural Modernization and concurrently appointed as Chairman of the National Food Authority, a position he held until 2004.

=== As city mayor ===
Sarmiento successfully vied for mayor of San Jose del Monte in 2004 but later lost his re-election bid to then Representative and former two-term Municipal Mayor and the first City Mayor Eduardo V. Roquero (who ran under the Kampi banner) in 2007, amid allegations of cheating and bomb threats. In 2009, after a seemingly lengthy legal battle on the resolution of his election protest which affected even the residents of the city (the Comelec earlier ruled that Sarmiento is the duly-elected mayor, thus nullifying Roquero's election, he returned to his mayoralty seat after the Supreme Court dismissed the petition of Acting Mayor Reynaldo San Pedro to stop Sarmiento from assuming the seat. San Pedro became the Acting Mayor of the city when Mayor Eduardo V. Roquero died on August 24, 2009.

Sarmiento formally assumed control of City Hall on October 26, 2009, after San Pedro peacefully conceded his hold of the mayorship of the city, following the Supreme Court, Comelec and DILG decisions and the effectivity of the contested Comelec resolution. As per the Department of the Interior and Local Government (DILG) order, San Pedro was reverted to his old position of vice mayor.

He ran for a full term as city mayor on 2010 but lost to Reynaldo San Pedro.

== Outside politics ==
Known as the "Dean of Agribusiness" during his term in Congress, Sarmiento sits as a member of the board of directors of the family-owned Vitarich Corporation, an agribusiness company which manufactures hog feeds, aquaculture feeds, agricultural feeds, speciality feeds (i.e. feeds for gamecocks), and livestock products (dressed chicken, dory fish, and day-old chicks). On October 1, 2015, he died of a heart attack.

House of Representatives of the Philippines
Preceded by Rogaciano M. Mercado	Representative, 4th District of Bulacan; 1992-2001	Succeeded by Reylina G. Nicolas
Political offices
Preceded by Eduardo V. Roquero	City Mayor of San Jose del Monte; 2004 - 2007	Succeeded by Eduardo V. Roquero
Preceded by Reynaldo S. San Pedro (Acting Mayor)	City Mayor of San Jose del Monte; 2009 - 2010	Succeeded by Reynaldo S. San Pedro
