= Nene Go =

Ma. Catalina L. Go

Member of Philippine House of Representatives from Leyte's 5th congressional district
- In office June 30, 1998 – June 30, 2001
- Preceded by: Eriberto V. Loreto
- Succeeded by: Carmen Loreto–Cari

Personal details
- Born: Ma. Catalina L. Loreto; February 5, 1962 (age 64) Baybay, Leyte, Philippines
- Parent: Eriberto Loreto (father)

Ma. Catalina L. Loreto-Go also known as Nene L. Go (born February 5, 1962, in Baybay, Leyte) is a former member of the House of Representatives of the Philippines, representing the Fifth District. She is the daughter of former Mayor of Baybay and congressional representative Eriberto V. Loreto.
