= Sergio Dagooc =

Filipino politician

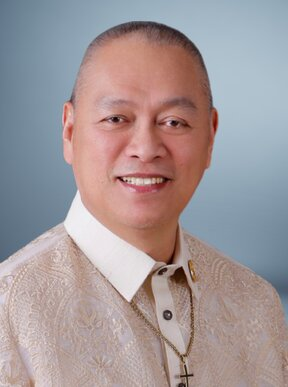
- Official portrait, 2025

Representative of APEC Partylist to the House of Representatives of the Philippines
- Incumbent
- Assumed office June 30, 2019
- Preceded by: Ponciano Payuyo

House Deputy Minority Leader
- Incumbent
- Assumed office July 30, 2025
- Leader: Marcelino Libanan

Personal details
- Born: Sergio Cabajes Dagooc; April 11, 1961 (age 64) Libjo, Surigao del Norte (now Dinagat Islands)
- Party: APEC Partylist
- Occupation: Politician

Sergio Cabajes Dagooc (born April 11, 1961) is a Filipino politician and representative to the House of Representatives of the Philippines for the APEC Partylist. He was born in Libjo. In his tenure as congressman, he principally authored 384 bills and co-authored 25.

== Early life ==
Sergio Cabajes Dagooc was born in Libjo, Surigao del Norte (now Dinagat Islands) on April 11, 1961. Just before his tenure as congressman, he was the General Manager for the Dinagat Island Electric Cooperative.

== Political career ==
APEC Partylist gained 11th place in the 2019 Philippine House of Representatives elections with 479,729 votes, 1.74 percent of the votes. Since Dagooc was a member of APEC, he gained a seat. On July 26, 2019, he was held at Ninoy Aquino International Airport after he joked that his bag contained a bomb. On November 1, 2021, he told the Department of Energy to try removing the excise tax in fuel products used by power plants. APEC Partylist gained 49th place in the 2022 Philippine House of Representatives elections with 271,380 votes, 0.74 percent of the votes. Since Dagooc was a member, he gained another seat. On September 24, 2022, he questioned the Armed Forces of the Philippines 'Palabra de Honor' because it failed to pay the electric bills of the camps. On February 28, 2024, he had a debate with Orion Dumdum, a quiz show participant over economic restrictions in the 1987 Constitution. He is the first nominee of APEC for the 2025 Philippine House of Representatives elections.
