= Hussin Ututalum Amin =

Filipino politician and scholar (born 1951)

- هُسِّنْ اُتُْتَلُمْ اَمِنْ

Mayor of Jolo
- In office June 30, 2007 – June 30, 2016

Member of the Philippine House of Representatives from Sulu's First District
- In office June 30, 1998 – June 30, 2007
- Preceded by: Bensaudi Tulawie
- Succeeded by: Yusop Jikiri

Personal details
- Born: October 3, 1951 (age 75) Jolo, Sulu, Philippines
- Party: Lakas (2001–2007; 2008–2016)
- Other political affiliations: KAMPI (2007–2008); LAMMP (1998–2001)
- Education: Philippine Muslim College; University of the East

Hussin Ututalum Amin (born October 3, 1951) is a Filipino politician and scholar.

== Biography ==
Amin was born in Bus-bus, Jolo, and attended the Philippine Muslim College in Jolo, where he obtained a Bachelor of Arts degree in History in 1972. Later, he pursued his legal education at the University of the East, earning a Bachelor of Laws degree in 1978. He also served in the Philippine Army stationed in Zamboanga City.

In 2024, he was acquitted by the Sandiganbayan of graft over his involvement in the Fertilizer Fund scam in 2004.
