= Sergio Apostol =

Filipino lawyer and politician (born 1935)

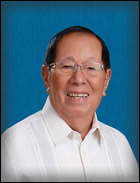
- Official portrait, 2013

House Majority Leader
- In office January 24, 2001 – June 8, 2001
- Preceded by: Bella Angara
- Succeeded by: Neptali Gonzales II

3rd Chief Presidential Legal Counsel
- In office January 20, 2001 – June 30, 2010
- President: Gloria Macapagal Arroyo
- Preceded by: Antonio Nachura
- Succeeded by: Eduardo de Mesa

Member of the Philippine House of Representatives from Leyte's 2nd congressional district
- In office June 30, 2010 – June 30, 2016
- Preceded by: Trinidad G. Apostol
- Succeeded by: Henry Ong
- In office June 30, 1992 – June 30, 2001
- Preceded by: Manuel L. Horca Jr.
- Succeeded by: Trinidad G. Apostol

Personal details
- Born: Sergio Antonio Figueroa Apostol; January 17, 1935 (age 91) Catbalogan, Samar, Philippine Islands
- Party: Liberal (2009–present)
- Other political affiliations: KBL (until 1992); Lakas–CMD (1992–2009)
- Profession: Politician

Sergio Antonio Figueroa Apostol (born January 17, 1935) is a Filipino lawyer and politician who served as a Philippine representative in the Leyte's 2nd district from 1992 to 2001 and again from 2010 to 2016.

== Biography ==
Apostol, a Roman Catholic, graduated from the Ateneo Law School and was a member of the Ateneo Law Journal. He passed the Philippine Bar exams in 1958, finishing 7th. He was the City Fiscal for Quezon City, Regional Trial Court Judge, Philippine Congressman for the 2nd District of Leyte, chairman and CEO of Philippine National Oil Company and Cabinet Secretary.

In 2008, Sergio Apostol was Chief Presidential Legal Counsel for Philippine President Gloria Macapagal Arroyo. On October 8, 2008, Eduardo Ermita confirmed Apostol's resignation, effective October 30, to prepare for his candidacy, for Leyte congressional seat, in the 2010 Philippine general election. Apostol is a member of the board of Union Bank and the legal consultant of the SSS’ Social Security Commission (SSC). After winning his district's seat as member of Lakas–CMD, Apostol switched allegiance to the Liberal Party of Benigno Aquino III, the winner of the 2010 presidential election.

=== Controversy ===
As Arroyo's Presidential Legal Counsel, Apostol engineered the pardon of Joseph Estrada. The Gloria Macapagal Arroyo government thought of an amnesty for Estrada in hope of "reconciling with the opposition" and "unifying the country."

House of Representatives of the Philippines
Preceded by Trini Apostol	Member of the House of Representatives from Leyte's 2nd district 2010–2016	Succeeded by Henry Ong
Preceded by Manuel Horca Jr.	Member of the House of Representatives from Leyte's 2nd district 1992–2001	Succeeded by Trini Apostol
Preceded by Bella Angara	House Majority Leader; 2001	Succeeded by Neptali Gonzales II
