= Nereus Acosta =

Filipino politician

Neric Acosta
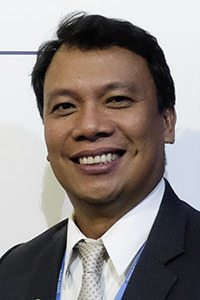

Presidential Adviser for Environmental Protection
- In office August 24, 2011 – June 30, 2016
- President: Benigno S. Aquino III

General Manager, Laguna Lake Development Authority
- In office September 2011 – June 30, 2016
- Preceded by: Rodrigo Cabrera

Member of the Philippine House of Representatives from Bukidnon's 1st congressional district
- In office June 30, 1998 – June 30, 2007
- Preceded by: Socorro Acosta
- Succeeded by: Candido Pancrudo Jr.

Member of the Provincial Board of Bukidnon
- In office June 30, 1995 – June 30, 1998

Personal details
- Born: May 14, 1966 (age 60) Manolo Fortich, Bukidnon, Philippines
- Party: Independent (2021–present)
- Other political affiliations: Liberal (1995–2021)
- Spouse: Carina Chotirawe
- Relations: Maria Lourdes Acosta-Alba (sister); Jose Manuel Alba (brother-in-law)
- Parent: Socorro Acosta (mother)
- Education: University of the Philippines Diliman (B.A.); Indiana University of Pennsylvania (M.A.); University of Hawaii at Manoa (PhD)

Juan Romeo Nereus Olaivar Acosta (born May 14, 1966), popularly known as Neric Acosta, is a Filipino politician, academician, and political scientist in the Philippines. He is a former member of the Philippine House of Representatives, representing the first district of the province of Bukidnon from 1998 to 2007. He was the Presidential Adviser for Environmental Protection and General Manager of the Laguna Lake Development Authority during the administration of President Benigno Aquino III.

== Early life and education ==
Acosta was born on May 14, 1966, in Camp Phillips, Manolo Fortich in Bukidnon.

Acosta studied at Our Lady of Lourdes Elementary School in Phillips, Bukidnon, graduating valedictorian in 1979. He studied in Xavier University - Ateneo de Cagayan during high school, graduating first honors in 1981.

Acosta earned a Bachelor of Arts in political science from the University of the Philippines Diliman in 1986, and attended the UP College of Law but did not graduate.

Acosta obtained a Master of Arts in public affairs with distinction (international relations and political studies concentration) from Indiana University of Pennsylvania in 1987. He was conferred a Doctor of Philosophy in political science from the University of Hawaii at Manoa, as a scholar of the East West Center, in 1994. He similarly attended the special programs on Leaders in Development Program (1999) and Environmental Economics (2002) at Harvard Kennedy School at Harvard University.

In 2004, Acosta was recognized as the first Filipino World Fellow of Yale University.

== Career ==
Acosta started as a staff researcher in the Committee on International Economic Policy of Representative Ramon Bagatsing in 1989. He was project director of the Bukidnon Integrated Network of Home Industries, Inc. (BINHI), a non-governmental organization involved in Grameen banking, in 1995.

A believer in education as a great equalizer, Acosta co-founded the Northern Bukidnon Community College, which caters primarily to Lumad (indigenous) students and scholars. He is also a member of the Board of the Cagayan de Oro College.

Acosta taught as professor and academic consultant in Xavier University - Ateneo de Cagayan, University of the Philippines Diliman and the Bukidnon State University from 1992 to 1998. He was also a professorial lecturer at the School of Government of Ateneo de Manila University and at the Department of Political Science of De La Salle University, teaching graduate students on public policy and the Philippine development experience. Currently, Acosta is a core professor of the Executive Education and Lifelong Learning Center (EXCELL) of the Asian Institute of Management. Well respected by his students, his teaching style is facilitative, insightful, and thought-provoking.

Meanwhile, he continues to live his environmental advocacy through his memberships in the Boards of the Earth Council of the Philippines, and the PATH Foundation Philippines, Inc. (PFPI) promoting the integrated Population, Health and the Environment (PHE) approach. He is also an active member of the Partnership for clean Air, Philippines, and the Founding Director of E-LEAD (Center for Ecological Governance, Leadership and Development). Acosta recently served as Lead Convenor of The Philippine Climate Change Imperative, an initiative that aims to engage the private sector in drawing up a proposal that will address the issues of climate change. In 2011, he was part of the Philippine delegation to the 2011 United Nations Climate Change Conference in Durban, South Africa, which aimed to establish a new global treaty to limit carbon emissions.

=== Political life ===
In 2009, Acosta was selected to run under Benigno Aquino III for the Philippine Senate in the 2010 Philippine general election along with Sonia Roco, General Danilo Lim, Martin Bautista, Alex Lacson, fellow Bukidnon Congressman Teofisto Guingona III, Muslim peace advocate Yasmin Busran-Lao, former senator Serge Osmena, Muntinlupa Congressman Ruffy Biazon, former senator Ralph Recto, Akbayan congresswoman Risa Hontiveros and former senator Franklin Drilon. He eventually lost.

He first ran and won as a provincial board member of Bukidnon from 1995 to 1998. He ran and won a seat as Representative of the First District of Bukidnon province in Northern Mindanao for three consecutive terms from 1998 to 2007. He served as Chairman of the Committee on Ecology and Vice Chairman of the Committees on Science and Technology, Human Rights, and Foreign Relations of the House of Representatives.

He is the principal author of many environmental laws in the Philippines, including the groundbreaking Clean Air Act, the Clean Water Act, the Solid Waste Management Act, and the Biodiversity Protection Act. The Clean Air Act of 1999 received various awards and citations, including the Oscar Escobar Environmental Award and the Citizens' Movement Against Pollution Award, both in 2002.

He has represented the Philippines in numerous international forums, including the United Nations Special Assembly on HIV/AIDS and the Asian Forum of Parliamentarians on Population and Development, where he served as the Deputy Secretary General.

From 1998 to 2001, he served as the national chairperson of the Kabataang Liberal ng Pilipinas, the youth arm of the Liberal Party (Philippines), where he is now Secretary General. He is also at present the Secretary General of the Council of Asian Liberals and Democrats.

=== Authorship ===
Acosta has authored various articles on politics, leadership and governance, development, education, and the environment, and has published widely in various magazines and national dailies. He co-authored a book entitled "The Philippine Political Culture (View from Inside the Halls of Power)" in 2001. He has also published "Population, Poverty, and Politics" (2001), and "Alternative Political Campaign Strategies" for the Friedrich Nauman Stiftung-Philippines in 2005. Meanwhile, his essay on "Internationalization and the Search for Global Identities" won the plum prize during a competition for the magazine Intersect-Japan and the PHP Institute of America in Japan in 1995.

His articles on political and public life regularly appear in the Perspectives section of the website, TheLobbyist.Biz.

=== Awards ===
Nereus (Neric) Acosta was named by Yale University as one of the 16 distinguished World Fellows from around the world, the first Filipino to be given such distinction (2004). As Presidential Adviser for Environmental Protection and member of the Cabinet of President Benigno Aquino III, Acosta co-headed, along with the Climate Change Commission, the Philippine delegation to the 21st United Nations Conference of Parties (COP 21) on Climate Change in Paris, France (2015). In recognition of his contributions to policy-making, education, and advocacy work, Acosta was included in NewsBizAsia's 100 Most Influential Filipinos (2002), and was cited by Asiaweek as representing the "youthful, hopeful change for the country." Adding to his numerous accomplishments, he was also selected as one of The Outstanding Young Persons (TOYP) - Asia Pacific by the Osaka, Japan Junior Chamber (1995).

== Private life ==
Acosta is married to Carina Chotirawe, a full-time professor at Chulalongkorn University in Thailand. They have a son, Inigo Juan. Acosta is also featured in the book Profiles encourage: Ordinary Filipinos making an extraordinary difference, published by Anvil Publishing, along with others who have made significant contributions in Philippine society.

House of Representatives of the Philippines
Preceded by Socorro Acosta	Member of the House of Representatives from Bukidnon's 1st district 1998–2007	Succeeded by Candido Pancrudo Jr.
