= APEC Partylist =

Political party in the Philippines

APEC
- — Philippine partylist —
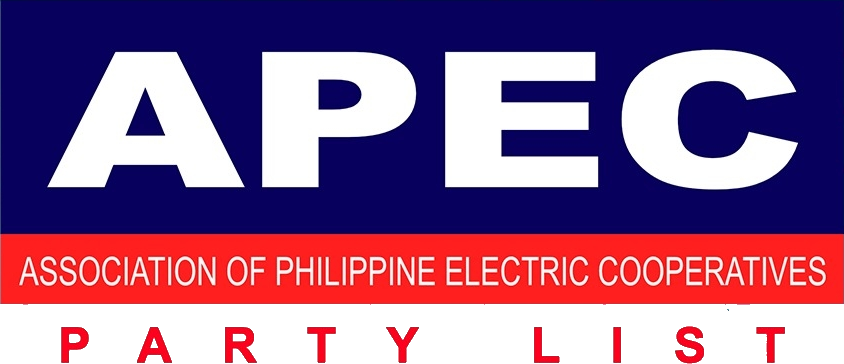
- Full name: Association of Philippine Electric Cooperatives
- Sector(s) represented: Electric power cooperatives
- Colors: Navy Blue, Red

Current representation (20th Congress)
- Seats in the House of Representatives: 1 / 3 (Out of 63 party-list seats)
- Representative(s): Sergio Dagooc

The Association of Philippine Electric Cooperatives, also known as the APEC Partylist, is a party list in the Philippines representing cooperatives in the electricity sector, mainly urban and suburban areas. Sunny Rose Madamba, Ernesto Pablo, and Edgar Valdez are the party's three representatives in the House of Representatives. In the 14 May 2007 election, the party won 2 seats in the nationwide party-list vote.

== History ==
The Association of Philippine Electric Cooperatives (APEC) was formed for the purpose of joining the 1998 Philippine House of Representatives elections, the first ever election where party-list groups were elected to the lower house of the Congress. Five months prior to the election, electric cooperatives mostly from Mindanao hastily formed APEC including its names and nominees. It is the only organization garner more than 4 percent votes.

This along with the consequential lack of a track record caused APEC's eligibility be questioned before the Commission on Elections (Comelec) which was later won by the group. APEC insisted that it can't be faulted for the Comelec's late issuance of the implementing rules and regulations for Republic Act No. 7941 of the Partylist law. The Supreme Court dismissed the disqualification case against APEC in 2002.

Former APEC representative Edgar Valdez was charged with receiving P57.787 million in kickbacks through bogus foundations formed by Janet Lim-Napoles. In February 2015, the Sandiganbayan anti-graft court issued a warrant of arrest against Valdez on plunder charges in connection with the pork barrel scam.

== Electoral performance ==
Election	Votes	%	Seats
1998	503,487	5.50%	2 / 51
2001	802,060	5.30%	2 / 52
2004	934,995	7.35%	3 / 52
2007	619,657	3.88%	2 / 53
2010	313,359	1.04%	1 / 57
2013	146,111	0.53%	0 / 59
2016	-	-	0 / 59
2019	479,729	1.74%	1 / 61
2022	271,380	0.74%	1 / 63
2025	310,427	0.74%	1 / 63

== Representatives to Congress ==
Period	1st Representative	2nd Representative	3rd Representative
13th Congress; 2004–2007	Sunny Rose Madamba	Ernesto Pablo	Edgar Valdez
14th Congress; 2007–2010	Ernesto Pablo	Edgar Valdez	—N/a
15th Congress; 2010–2013	Ponciano Payuyo	—N/a	—N/a
18th Congress; 2019–2022	Sergio Dagooc	—N/a	—N/a
19th Congress; 2022–2025	Sergio Dagooc	—N/a	—N/a
20th Congress; 2025–2028	Sergio Dagooc	—N/a	—N/a
