= 9th Congress of the Philippines =

30th legislative term of the Philippines

←	8th	10th	→
- Old Legislative Building (c. 1988) (top) and Batasang Pambansa Complex (2010) (bottom)

Overview
- Term: July 27, 1992 – June 9, 1995
- President: Fidel Ramos
- Vice President: Joseph Estrada

Senate
- Members: 24
- President: Neptali Gonzales (until January 18, 1993); Edgardo Angara (from January 18, 1993)
- President pro tempore: Ernesto Maceda (until January 18, 1993); Teofisto Guingona Jr. (January 18 – July 6, 1993); Leticia Ramos-Shahani (from July 6, 1993)
- Majority leader: Alberto Romulo
- Minority leader: Wigberto Tañada

House of Representatives
- Members: 216
- Speaker: Jose de Venecia Jr.
- Speaker pro tempore: Raul Daza
- Majority leader: Ronaldo Zamora
- Minority leader: Hernando Perez

The 9th Congress of the Philippines (Filipino: Ikasiyam na Kongreso ng Pilipinas), composed of the Philippine Senate and House of Representatives, met from July 27, 1992, until June 9, 1995, during the first three years of Fidel Ramos's presidency. The convening of the 9th Congress follows the 1992 national elections, where, under the transitory provisions of the Constitution, the first 12 senators who garnered the highest votes would have a six-year term while the next 12 senators would have a three-year term and the entire membership of the House of Representatives was replaced.

== Sessions ==
- First Regular Session: July 27, 1992 – June 4, 1993
  - First Special Session: January 4 – February 26, 1993
  - Second Special Session: March 8 – April 16, 1993
- Second Regular Session: July 26, 1993 – June 10, 1994
  - Third Special Session: January 3 – April 1, 1994
- Third Regular Session: July 25, 1994 – June 9, 1995
  - Fourth Special Session: January 2 – February 24, 1995
  - Fifth Special Session: February 27 – March 24, 1995
  - Sixth Special Session: March 27 – April 7, 1995
  - Seventh Special Session: April 10 – May 5, 1995

== Leadership ==
=== Senate ===
Senate President

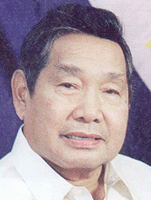
Neptali Gonzales,
until January 18, 1993

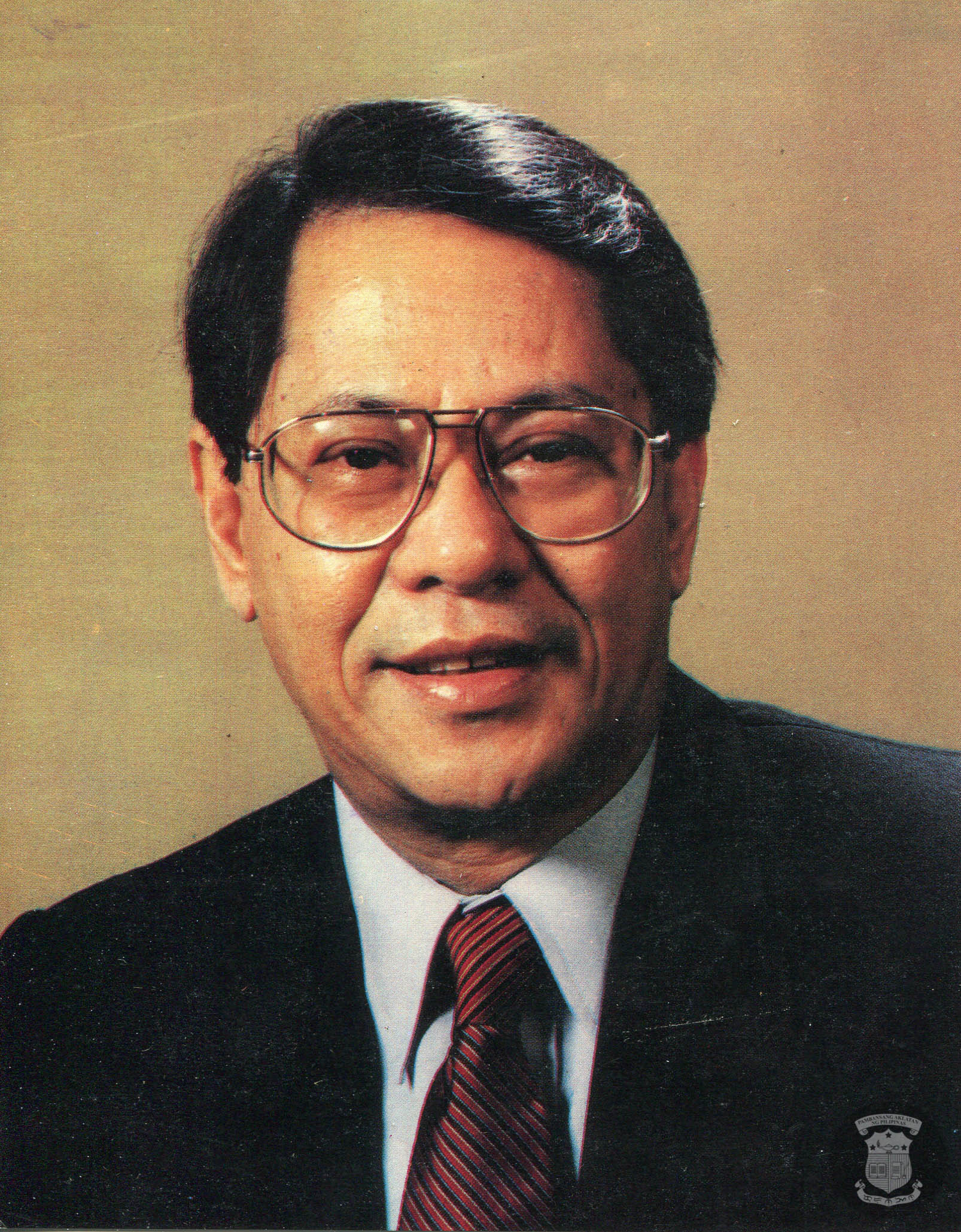
Edgardo Angara,
from January 18, 1993

- President:
  - Neptali Gonzales (LDP), until January 18, 1993
  - Edgardo Angara (LDP), from January 18, 1993
- President pro tempore:
  - Ernesto Maceda (NPC), until January 18, 1993
  - Teofisto Guingona Jr. (LDP), January 18 – July 6, 1993
  - Leticia Ramos-Shahani (Lakas), from July 6, 1993
- Majority Floor Leader: Alberto Romulo (LDP)
- Minority Floor Leader: Wigberto Tañada (LP–PDP)

=== House of Representatives ===
House Speaker

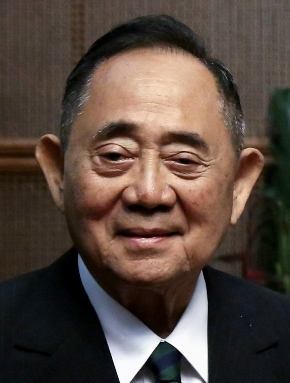
Jose de Venecia Jr.

- Speaker: Jose de Venecia Jr. (Pangasinan–4th, Lakas)
- Speaker pro tempore: Raul Daza (Northern Samar–1st, LP–PDP)
- Majority Floor Leader: Ronaldo Zamora (San Juan–Mandaluyong–Lone, LDP)
- Minority Floor Leader: Hernando Perez (Batangas–2nd, LDP)

== Members ==
=== Senate ===
Final Senate composition.

All senators of this Congress were elected on May 11, 1992 for the following terms, according to their ranking:

- For the first twelve senators: June 30, 1992 – June 30, 1998
- For the other twelve senators: June 30, 1992 – June 30, 1995

Senator	Party (Note: Party affiliation at election.)	Term	Term end
Heherson Alvarez	LDP	2	1998
Edgardo Angara	LDP	2	1998
Butz Aquino	LDP	2	1995
Rodolfo Biazon	LDP	1	1995
Nikki Coseteng	NPC	1	1995
Neptali Gonzales	LDP	2	1998
Teofisto Guingona Jr. (Note: Teofisto Guingona Jr. resigned on July 6, 1993, upon being appointed as Executive Secretary.)	LDP	2	1995
Ernesto Herrera	LDP	2	1998
Joey Lina	LDP	2	1995
Gloria Macapagal Arroyo	LDP	1	1995
Ernesto Maceda	NPC	2	1998
Orly Mercado	LDP	2	1998
Blas Ople	LDP	1	1998
John Henry Osmeña	NPC	2	1995
Nina Rasul	Lakas	2	1995
Ramon Revilla Sr.	LDP	1	1998
Raul Roco	LDP	1	1995
Alberto Romulo	LDP	2	1998
Leticia Ramos-Shahani	Lakas	2	1998
Tito Sotto	LDP	1	1998
Wigberto Tañada	LP–PDP	2	1995
Francisco Tatad	NPC	1	1995
Arturo Tolentino	NPC	1	1995
Freddie Webb	LDP	1	1998

=== House of Representatives ===
Final House of Representatives composition.

Ninth Congress representation map of the Philippines

Province/City	District	Representative	Party	Term
Abra	Lone	Jeremias Zapata	Lakas	1
Agusan del Norte	1st	Charito Plaza	LDP	2
Agusan del Norte	2nd	Edelmiro Amante (Note: Edelmiro Amante resigned on September 14, 1992, upon being appointed as Executive Secretary. He was elected again on August 30, 1993, and retook office on September 6, 1993.)	Lakas	2
Agusan del Sur	Lone	Ceferino Paredes Jr.	NPC (Note: Also affiliated with Pagtinabangay.)	1
Aklan	Lone	Allen Quimpo	LDP	1
Albay	1st	Edcel Lagman	LDP	2
Albay	2nd	Carlos R. Imperial	NPC	2
Albay	3rd	Al Francis Bichara	NPC	1
Antique	Lone	Exequiel Javier	Lakas	2
Aurora	Lone	Benedicto Miran	LDP	2
Bacolod	Lone	Romeo Guanzon	LDP	2
Baguio	Lone	Bernardo Vergara	NPC	1
Basilan	Lone	Elnorita Tugung	Lakas	1
Bataan	1st	Felicito Payumo	LP–PDP	2
Bataan	2nd	Dominador Venegas	NPC	1
Batanes	Lone	Enrique Lizardo	LDP	1
Batangas	1st	Eduardo Ermita	Lakas	1
Batangas	2nd	Hernando Perez	LDP	2
Batangas	3rd	Milagros Laurel-Trinidad	Nacionalista	2
Batangas	4th	Ralph Recto	Nacionalista	1
Benguet	Lone	Samuel Dangwa	LDP	2
Bohol	1st	Venice Borja-Agana	Lakas	2
Bohol	2nd	Erico Aumentado	Nacionalista (Note: Also affiliated with the Nationalist People's Coalition.)	1
Bohol	3rd	Isidro Zarraga	LDP	2
Bukidnon	1st	Socorro Acosta	LP–PDP	2
Bukidnon	2nd	Reginaldo Tilanduca	NPC	1
Bukidnon	3rd	Jose Maria Zubiri Jr.	NPC	2
Bulacan	1st	Teodulo Natividad	Lakas	1
Bulacan	2nd	Pedro Pancho	NPC	1
Bulacan	3rd	Ricardo Silverio	LDP	1
Bulacan	4th	Angelito Sarmiento	Lakas	1
Cagayan	1st	Juan Ponce Enrile	Nacionalista	1
Cagayan	2nd	Edgar Lara	NPC	1
Cagayan	3rd	Francisco Mamba	Lakas	1
Cagayan de Oro	Lone	Erasmo Damasing	LP–PDP	1
Caloocan	1st	Aurora Henson	Independent (Note: Also affiliated with Liping Kalookan.)	1
Caloocan	2nd	Luis Asistio	Independent	1
Camarines Norte	Lone	Emmanuel Pimentel	NPC	1
Camarines Sur	1st	Rolando Andaya	Lakas	2
Camarines Sur	2nd	Celso Baguio	PMP	1
Camarines Sur	3rd	Arnulfo Fuentebella	Nacionalista	1
Camarines Sur	4th	Ciriaco Alfelor	LP–PDP	2
Camiguin	Lone	Pedro Romualdo	LDP	2
Capiz	1st	Gerardo Roxas Jr. (Note: Gerardo Roxas Jr. died on April 4, 1993.)	LP–PDP (Note: Also affiliated with Lakas–NUCD.) (Note: Also affiliated with the Nacionalista Party.)	2
Capiz	1st	Mar Roxas (Note: Mar Roxas was elected on August 30, 1993, to succeed Gerardo Roxas Jr.. He took office on September 1, 1993.)	Liberal	0
Capiz	2nd	Vicente Andaya Jr.	Lakas (Note: Also affiliated with the Koalisyong Pambansa.)	1
Catanduanes	Lone	Leandro Verceles Jr.	Lakas	1
Cavite	1st	Dominador Nazareno Jr.	NPC	1
Cavite	2nd	Renato Dragon	LDP (Note: Also affiliated with the Partido Magdalo.)	2
Cavite	3rd	Telesforo Unas	LDP	1
Cebu	1st	Eduardo Gullas	NPC	1
Cebu	2nd	Crisologo Abines	LDP	2
Cebu	3rd	Pablo P. Garcia	Lakas	2
Cebu	4th	Celestino Martinez Jr.	LDP	2
Cebu	5th	Ramon Durano III	LDP	2
Cebu	6th	Nerissa Soon-Ruiz	NPC	1
Cebu City	1st	Raul del Mar	Panaghiusa	2
Cebu City	2nd	Antonio Cuenco	LDP	2
Cotabato	1st	Anthony Dequiña	NPC (Note: Also affiliated with the Grand Alliance for Democracy.)	1
Cotabato	2nd	Gregorio Andolana	LDP	2
Davao City	1st	Jesus Dureza	NPC	2
Davao City	2nd	Manuel Garcia	NPC	1
Davao City	3rd	Elias Lopez	NPC	1
Davao del Norte	1st	Rogelio Sarmiento	LDP	1
Davao del Norte	2nd	Baltazar Sator	LDP	2
Davao del Norte	3rd	Rodolfo del Rosario	LDP	2
Davao del Sur	1st	Alejandro Almendras	Lakas	1
Davao del Sur	2nd	Benjamin Bautista Sr.	NPC (Note: Also affiliated with the Kilusang Bagong Lipunan.)	2
Davao Oriental	1st	Maria Elena Palma-Gil	LDP	1
Davao Oriental	2nd	Thelma Almario	LDP	2
Eastern Samar	Lone	Jose Ramirez	Lakas	2
Ifugao	Lone	Benjamin Cappleman	LDP	1
Ilocos Norte	1st	Roque Ablan Jr.	KBL	2
Ilocos Norte	2nd	Bongbong Marcos	KBL	1
Ilocos Sur	1st	Mariano Tajon	LDP	1
Ilocos Sur	2nd	Eric Singson	LDP	2
Iloilo	1st	Oscar Garin	Lakas	2
Iloilo	2nd	Alberto Lopez	Lakas	2
Iloilo	3rd	Licurgo Tirador	Lakas	2
Iloilo	4th	Nicetas Panes	LDP	1
Iloilo	5th	Niel Tupas Sr.	LP–PDP	2
Iloilo City	Lone	Rafael Lopez-Vito	Lakas	2
Isabela	1st	Rodolfo Albano Jr.	NPC	2
Isabela	2nd	Faustino Dy Jr.	Lakas (Note: Also affiliated with the Laban ng Demokratikong Pilipino.)	1
Isabela	3rd	Santiago Respicio	Lakas	2
Isabela	4th	Antonio Abaya	NPC	2
Kalinga-Apayao	Lone	Elias Bulut	LDP	1
La Union	1st	Victor Ortega	NPC	2
La Union	2nd	Jose Aspiras	NPC	2
Laguna	1st	Roy Almoro	LDP	1
Laguna	2nd	Rodolfo Tingzon	LDP	1
Laguna	3rd	Florante Aquino	LDP	2
Laguna	4th	Magdaleno Palacol Sr.	LDP	2
Lanao del Norte	1st	Mariano Badelles	LDP	2
Lanao del Norte	2nd	Macabangkit Lanto (Note: Macabangkit Lanto was removed by the House of Representatives Electoral Tribunal on July 22, 1994, after an electoral protest.)	Lakas	1
Lanao del Norte	2nd	Mario Hisuler (Note: Mario Hisuler took office on October 5, 1994, after winning an electoral protest against Macabangkit Lanto.)	LDP	0
Lanao del Sur	1st	Mamintal Adiong Sr.	Lakas	1
Lanao del Sur	2nd	Mohammad Ali Dimaporo	KBL	2
Las Piñas–Muntinlupa	Lone	Manny Villar	Independent	1
Leyte	1st	Cirilo Roy Montejo	LDP	2
Leyte	2nd	Sergio Apostol	KBL	1
Leyte	3rd	Alberto Veloso	LDP	2
Leyte	4th	Carmelo Locsin	Lakas	2
Leyte	5th	Eriberto Loreto	LDP	2
Maguindanao	1st	Michael Mastura	LDP	2
Maguindanao	2nd	Simeon Datumanong	LDP	1
Makati	Lone	Joker Arroyo (Note: Joker Arroyo was removed by the House of Representatives Electoral Tribunal on January 25, 1995. Arroyo's removal was reversed by the Supreme Court on July 14, 1995.)	Independent	1
Malabon–Navotas	Lone	Tessie Aquino-Oreta	LDP	2
Manila	1st	Martin Isidro	LDP	2
Manila	2nd	Jaime Lopez	Lakas	2
Manila	3rd	Leonardo Fugoso	LP–PDP	2
Manila	4th	Ramon Bagatsing Jr.	LDP	2
Manila	5th	Amado Bagatsing	LDP	2
Manila	6th	Rosenda Ann Ocampo	NPC	1
Marikina	Lone	Romeo Candazo	LDP	1
Marinduque	Lone	Carmencita Reyes	LDP	2
Masbate	1st	Tito Espinosa (Note: Tito Espinosa was assassinated on February 28, 1995.)	LDP	2
Masbate	2nd	Luz Cleta Bakunawa	LDP	2
Masbate	3rd	Antonio Kho	Lakas	1
Misamis Occidental	1st	Percival Catane	NPC	1
Misamis Occidental	2nd	Hilarion Ramiro Jr.	Lakas	2
Misamis Oriental	1st	Homobono Cesar	LDP	1
Misamis Oriental	2nd	Victorico Chaves	LDP	2
Mountain Province	Lone	Victor Dominguez	Lakas	2
Negros Occidental	1st	Tranquilino Carmona	NPC	1
Negros Occidental	2nd	Manuel Puey	LP–PDP	2
Negros Occidental	3rd	Jose Carlos Lacson	LDP	2
Negros Occidental	4th	Edward Matti	NPC	2
Negros Occidental	5th	Mariano Yulo	NPC	2
Negros Occidental	6th	Hortensia Starke	Lakas	2
Negros Oriental	1st	Jerome Paras	Lakas	2
Negros Oriental	2nd	Miguel Romero	LDP	2
Negros Oriental	3rd	Margarito Teves	LDP	2
Northern Samar	1st	Raul Daza	LP–PDP	2
Northern Samar	2nd	Wilmar Lucero (Note: Wilmar Lucero was proclaimed as representative-elect on August 27, 1994.)	Liberal	1
Nueva Ecija	1st	Renato Diaz	Lakas	1
Nueva Ecija	2nd	Eleuterio Violago	NPC (Note: Also affiliated with the Bagong Lakas ng Nueva Ecija.)	1
Nueva Ecija	3rd	Pacifico Fajardo	NPC	1
Nueva Ecija	4th	Victorio Lorenzo	LDP	1
Nueva Vizcaya	Lone	Leonardo B. Perez	NPC	1
Occidental Mindoro	Lone	Jose T. Villarosa	LDP	1
Oriental Mindoro	1st	Renato Leviste	Nacionalista	1
Oriental Mindoro	2nd	Jesus Punzalan	LDP	2
Palawan	1st	David Ponce de Leon	LDP	2
Palawan	2nd	Alfredo Abueg Jr.	LDP	1
Pampanga	1st	Carmelo Lazatin Sr.	LDP	2
Pampanga	2nd	Emigdio Lingad	LDP	2
Pampanga	3rd	Andrea Domingo	Lakas	1
Pampanga	4th	Emigdio Bondoc	Nacionalista	1
Pangasinan	1st	Oscar Orbos	Independent	2
Pangasinan	2nd	Chris Mendoza	Lakas	1
Pangasinan	3rd	Eric Galo Acuña	NPC	1
Pangasinan	4th	Jose de Venecia Jr.	Lakas	2
Pangasinan	5th	Amadeo Perez Jr.	LDP	1
Pangasinan	6th	Conrado Estrella III	NPC	2
Parañaque	Lone	Roilo Golez	LDP	1
Pasay	Lone	Jovito Claudio	LDP	1
Pasig	Lone	Rufino Javier	NPC	2
Quezon	1st	Wilfrido Enverga	LDP	2
Quezon	2nd	Marcial Punzalan Jr.	LDP	1
Quezon	3rd	Danilo Suarez	NPC	1
Quezon	4th	Manolet Lavides	LDP	1
Quezon City	1st	Renato Yap	LDP	2
Quezon City	2nd	Dante Liban	LDP	1
Quezon City	3rd	Dennis Roldan	LDP	1
Quezon City	4th	Feliciano Belmonte Jr.	Independent	1
Quirino	Lone	Junie Cua	LDP	1
Rizal	1st	Manuel Sanchez (Note: Manuel Sanchez was removed by the Supreme Court on December 7, 1993, after an electoral protest.)	LP–PDP	1
Rizal	1st	Gilberto Duavit Sr. (Note: Gilberto Duavit Sr. was elected on March 7, 1994, to succeed Manuel Sanchez.)	NPC	0
Rizal	2nd	Emigdio Tanjuatco Jr.	LDP	2
Romblon	Lone	Eleandro Jesus Madrona	Lakas	1
Samar	1st	Rodolfo Tuazon	LDP	1
Samar	2nd	Catalino Figueroa	LP–PDP	1
San Juan–Mandaluyong	Lone	Ronaldo Zamora	LDP	2
Siquijor	Lone	Orlando Fua	LDP	2
Sorsogon	1st	Salvador Escudero	NPC	2
Sorsogon	2nd	Bonifacio Gillego	Lakas	2
South Cotabato	1st	Luwalhati Antonino	LDP	1
South Cotabato	2nd	Daisy Avance Fuentes	LP–PDP	1
South Cotabato	3rd	James Chiongbian	LDP	2
Southern Leyte	Lone	Roger Mercado	LDP	2
Sultan Kudarat	Lone	Estanislao Valdez	LDP	2
Sulu	1st	Bensaudi Tulawie	Lakas	1
Sulu	2nd	Asani Tammang	LDP	1
Surigao del Norte	1st	Glenda Ecleo	LDP	2
Surigao del Norte	2nd	Robert Barbers	Nacionalista	1
Surigao del Sur	1st	Mario Ty	LDP	2
Surigao del Sur	2nd	Ernesto Estrella	LDP	2
Taguig–Pateros	Lone	Dante Tiñga	LDP	2
Tarlac	1st	Peping Cojuangco	LDP	2
Tarlac	2nd	Jose Yap	LDP	2
Tarlac	3rd	Herminio Aquino	LDP	2
Tawi-Tawi	Lone	Nur Jaafar	LDP	1
Valenzuela	Lone	Antonio Serapio	NPC	2
Zambales	1st	Katherine Gordon	NPC	2
Zambales	2nd	Antonio Diaz	Lakas	1
Zamboanga City	Lone	Maria Clara Lobregat	LDP	2
Zamboanga del Norte	1st	Artemio Adasa Jr.	Lakas	2
Zamboanga del Norte	2nd	Ernesto Amatong	LP–PDP	2
Zamboanga del Norte	3rd	Angel Carloto	LDP	2
Zamboanga del Sur	1st	Alejandro Urro	Lakas	1
Zamboanga del Sur	2nd	Antonio Cerilles	NPC	2
Zamboanga del Sur	3rd	Belma Cabilao	Lakas	1
Cultural Minorities		Joseph Sibug (Note: Joseph Sibug died on February 14, 1994.)	Nonpartisan	1
Labor		Tomas Concepcion	Nonpartisan	1
Labor		Temistocles Dejon Sr.	Nonpartisan	1
Labor		Zoilo dela Cruz	Nonpartisan	1
Labor		Andres Dinglasan Jr.	Nonpartisan	1
Labor		Ramon Jabar	Nonpartisan	2
Labor		Paterno Menzon	Nonpartisan	1
Labor		Ernesto Verceles	Nonpartisan	1
Labor		Alejandro Villavisa	Nonpartisan	2
Peasant		Leonardo Montemayor	Nonpartisan	1
Peasant		Vicente Tagle	Nonpartisan	1
Urban Poor		Ariel Zartiga	Nonpartisan	1
Women		Minerva Laudico	Nonpartisan	1
Youth		Edgardo Avila	Nonpartisan	1
Youth		Cesar Chavez	Nonpartisan	1

== See also ==
- Congress of the Philippines
- Senate of the Philippines
- House of Representatives of the Philippines
- 1992 Philippine general election
