= 1994 Rizal's 1st congressional district special election =

1994 special election at Rizal's 1st congressional district
- March 7, 1994

Rizal's 1st congressional district
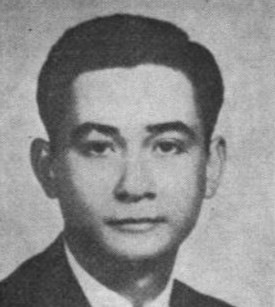

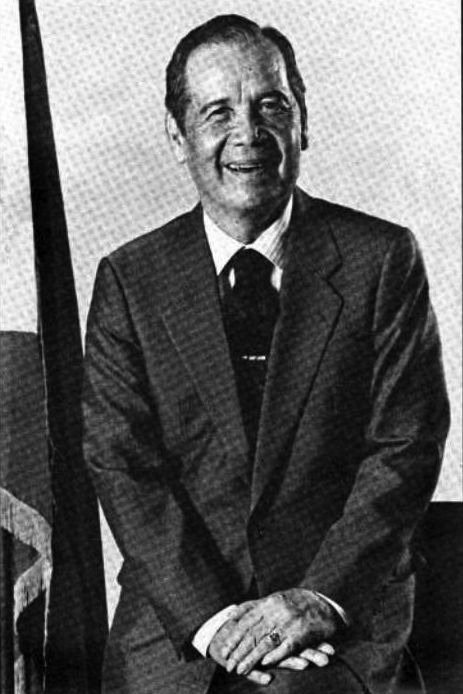

Candidate	Gilberto Duavit Sr.	Francisco Sumulong	Rogelio Sanchez Silvestre
Party	NPC	Lakas	Liberal
Popular vote	59,987	38,953	29,035
Percentage	46.46	30.17	22.49
Representative before election
Manuel Sanchez
Lakas
Representative-elect
Gilberto Duavit Sr.
NPC

A special election was held for Rizal's 1st district seat to the House of Representatives of the Philippines on March 7, 1994. It was called after incumbent representative Manuel Sanchez was removed from office on December 7, 1993, after the Supreme Court annulled his election due to his American citizenship. Gilberto Duavit Sr. won the special election to serve the final 14 months of Sanchez's term during the 9th Congress of the Philippines.

This was the first competitive special election held under the auspices of the 1987 constitution; the special elections in 1993 were all uncontested.

== Electoral system ==
Most seats in the House of Representatives were elected from single member districts, under the first-past-the-post voting system. Under the Omnibus Election Code, when a seat becomes vacant prior to eighteen months before the general election, the Commission on Elections shall call a special election.

Other seats were sectoral representatives appointed by the president.

== Background ==
Since its re-establishment in 1987, Rizal's 1st district consisted of the western municipalities of Angono, Antipolo, Binangonan, Cainta and Taytay.

Incumbent representative Manuel Sanchez was petitioned to be removed from office after the House of Representatives Electoral Tribunal (HRET) ruled that he is an American citizen. Sanchez then appealed to the Supreme Court. One of the members of the tribunal, David Ponce de Leon, asked House leadership to implement the tribunal's decision.

In December 1993, a Supreme Court decision affirmed the original HRET ruling, removing Sanchez from office. The court said Sanchez did not present proof that he is not an American citizen, that he did not renounce his American citizenship, nor did he reacquire Philippine citizenship; Sanchez denied ever being naturalized. The court gave weight to the certificate of naturalization issued by the United States Immigration and Naturalization Service. A few days later, the House approved a resolution urging the Commission on Elections to hold a special election.

A special election was then called, scheduled for March 7, 1994. Six candidates participated including Rogelio Sanchez Silvestre, Sanchez's nephew, former House majority leader Francisco Sumulong, former assemblyman Gilberto Duavit Sr. of the opposition Nationalist People's Coalition (NPC), and three independent candidates: chess grandmaster Rosendo Balinas Jr., lawyer Eduardo Inlayo and peasant leader Elmer Panotes.

Sumulong previously served as representative but gave up his seat to run unsuccessfully in the 1992 Senate election. Sumulong was supported by presidents Corazon Aquino and Fidel Ramos. Duavit was supported by Rizal governor Casimiro Ynares Jr. and vice president Joseph Estrada, while Silvestre was backed by former Senate President Jovito Salonga and other Liberal Party stalwarts.

Cainta and Taytay were expected to provide the swing votes as none of the candidates are from those two municipalities, and that many residents there were immigrants from other parts of the country. Turnout was expected to be low as no holiday was declared on election day.

== Candidates ==
There were six candidates in the special election:

1. Rosendo Balinas Jr. (independent), chess grandmaster
2. Gilberto Duavit Sr. (NPC), former member of the Batasang Pambansa from Rizal's at-large district (1984–1986)
3. Eduardo Inlayo (independent), lawyer
4. Elmer Panotes (independent), peasant leader
5. Rogelio Sanchez Silvestre (LIberal), former president of the League of Municipal Councilors of Rizal
6. Francisco Sumulong (Lakas), former member of the House of Representatives from Rizal's 1st district (1987–1992)

== Campaign ==
A seventh candidate, Joey Mendoza from Binangonan, withdrew and supported Sumulong. The special election was seen as a proxy war between Sumulong and Duavit on who the masses support between President Ramos and Vice President Estrada. The Silvestre and Duavit camps allege that Sumulong, when he was a congressman, hardly produced anything that benefitted Rizal. Sanchez had to fight off efforts of disallowing his maternal name "Sanchez" from being used, securing a Supreme Court temporary restraining order allowing him to include that on the ballot.

The Commission on Elections instructed candidates to remove illegally-posted campaign materials or be disqualified.

Sumulong's campaign leader pointed out the Ramos administration and congressional support gave the edge to his candidate. A Duavit ally said that a strong grassroots support for Duavit, including Vice President Estrada, Governor Ynares, and the five vice mayors of the towns in the district, plus the support of the Laban ng Demokratikong Pilipino and People's Reform Party, will hand them the victory. Ousted representative Sanchez personally campaigned for his nephew, and said that they are banking on the support of the Liberal Party and the youth to provide them with the upset.

== Result ==
On election day, the COMELEC observed the low turnout, with Duavit leading in the early returns. Duavit said that the Iglesia ni Cristo committed 15,000 to 20,000 votes to him, which was described as a big factor in Duavit's early lead. While the votes were being counted on election night, a power outage occurred in Antipolo, and later that night in Binangonan and Angono. The National Power Corporation and Meralco denied that there were scheduled power outages in the area on that day. Reports of "flying voters" (voters voting outside of their registered places) abounded. An incident involving 2nd district representative Ding Tanjuatco and several armed civilians arriving at a school being used as a polling station was described as "suspicious" by the COMELEC.

1994 Rizal's 1st congressional district special election
Candidate	Party	Votes	%	+/–
Gilberto Duavit Sr.	Nationalist People's Coalition	59,987	46.46	+23.93
Francisco Sumulong	Lakas–NUCD	38,953	30.17	−9.43
Rogelio Sanchez Silvestre	Liberal Party	29,035	22.49	+8.51
Eduardo Inlayo	Independent	729	0.56	N/A
Rosendo Balinas Jr.	Independent	270	0.21	N/A
Elmer Panotes	Independent	144	0.11	N/A
Total		129,118	100.00	–
Valid votes		129,118	99.10	
Invalid/blank votes		1,174	0.90	
Total votes		130,292	100.00	
Registered voters/turnout		349,639	37.26	
Majority		21,034	16.29	
Nationalist People's Coalition gain from Lakas–NUCD				

A day after, the COMELEC proclaimed Duavit as the winner, over former representative Francisco Sumulong by 21,034 votes. The low turnout of 37% was blamed on Rizal's traffic problems, and the inability of employees and students to cast their votes when they reside outside the district during weekdays. Duavit topped in Antipolo, a known Sumulong stronghold, and in Cainta and Taytay. Silvestre won in Angono. Sumulong also conceded to Duavit.

== Aftermath ==
After his election victory, a member of the Duavit family has served as representative of Rizal's 1st district up to the 19th Congress. By this time, Jack Duavit, son of Gilberto Sr., endorsed Mia Ynares (daughter of former Governor Casimiro Ynares Jr.) to succeed him as he was term-limited for the 2025 election. Ynares won, keeping the control of the Nationalist People's Coalition over the seat.

In 2001, Sanchez served as press undersecretary for broadcast under the Gloria Macapagal Arroyo administration, replacing Cerge Remonde. He explained that he reacquired his Filipino citizenship in July 1995, when he repatriated and took the oath of allegiance to the Philippine flag before Solicitor General Ramon Goco. Two years later, now chairman of the Energy Regulatory Commission, he resigned in order to contest the district against Jack Duavit in the 2004 elections.

== 1992 election results ==
Sanchez won under the Koalisyong Pambansa banner, a coalition of PDP–Laban and the Liberal Party; the two parties would later go about their separate ways, and by 1994, Sanchez was identified with the Liberal Party.

Severino Sumulong ran under the joint ticket of Lakas–NUCD and the Union of Muslim Democrats; these two parties would merge by the 1998 election as "Lakas–NUCD–UMDP".

Candidate	Party	Votes	%
Manuel Sanchez	Koalisyong Pambansa	61,707	31.92
Jose Hernandez	Nationalist People's Coalition	43,560	22.53
Severino Sumulong	Lakas–NUCD/Union of Muslim Democrats	41,880	21.66
Wilfredo Naval	People's Reform Party	19,141	9.90
Remedios Paralejas	Nacionalista Party/Kilusang Bagong Lipunan	13,556	7.01
Edwin Cuenco	Partido ng Masang Pilipino	13,281	6.87
Gilbert Saladaga	Independent	212	0.11
Total		193,337	100.00
