= House of Representatives Electoral Tribunal =

Government institution in the Philippines

- Established: 1987
- Jurisdiction: Philippines
- Location: Quezon City
- Composition method: Designation of the Chief Justice (3 members); Nomination by the House of Representatives (6 members)
- Authorized by: Constitution of the Philippines
- Appeals to: Supreme Court of the Philippines
- Number of positions: 9
- Website: Official website

Chairman
- Currently: Alfredo Benjamin Caguioa

The House of Representatives Electoral Tribunal (HRET) is an electoral tribunal that decides election protests in the House of Representatives of the Philippines. It consists of six representatives and three justices of the Supreme Court of the Philippines, who are designated by the Chief Justice. The equivalent tribunals for elections to the upper house is the Senate Electoral Tribunal and for president is the Presidential Electoral Tribunal. The tribunal is located at SET-HRET Building, Commission on Audit Compound, Quezon City.

Members of the Tribunal receive a monthly allowance of 100,000 Philippine pesos on top of their regular salaries.

In August 2020, the tribunal abandoned its old building in Quezon City when the city's Department of Building Official condemned it.

== History ==
In the 1935 constitution, the HRET had 9 members, 3 of which were justices of the Supreme Court designated by the Chief Justice, three designated by the largest political party, and another three from the second largest party.

In the 1987 constitution, the HRET still had 9 members, 3 were still justices of the Supreme Court designated by the Chief Justice, but the six members from the House were now "shall be chosen on the basis of proportional representation from the political parties and the parties or organizations registered under the party-list system represented therein".

== Current members ==
The chairman is always the most senior associate justice of the Supreme Court that's sitting on the tribunal.

The three members from the Supreme Court are designated by the chief justice. While there's no regular occurrence on when a chief justice designates members, this is almost certainly done when there is a new justice of the Supreme Court.

The six members from the House of Representatives are named in a resolution of the House. This always happens at the organization of the chamber at the start of every new Congress.

These are the members in the 20th Congress, which first convened on July 28, 2025

20th Congress (July 28, 2025 – June 30, 2028)
Members	Tenure started	Party	District	Membership
Alfredo Benjamin Caguioa	May 16, 2022	Nonpartisan	—N/a	Supreme Court associate justice (chairman)
Amy Lazaro-Javier	May 16, 2022	Nonpartisan	—N/a	Supreme Court associate justice
Rodil Zalameda	May 16, 2022	Nonpartisan	—N/a	Supreme Court associate justice
Bel Zamora	August 5, 2025	Lakas	San Juan	Representative from the majority
Munir Arbison	August 5, 2025	Lakas	Sulu–2nd	Representative from the majority
Linabelle Villarica	August 5, 2025	PFP	Batangas–3rd	Representative from the majority
Brian Yamsuan	August 11, 2025	NUP	Parañaque–2nd	Representative from the majority
Solomon Chungalao	August 11, 2025	NPC	Ifugao	Representative from the majority
Jan Rurik Padiernos	October 20, 2025	Galing sa Puso Party	Party-list	Representative from the minority

- Zaldy Co (Ako Bikol, party-list) served as member from August 11, 2025, until his resignation as House representative on September 29, 2025.

== Successful contests ==
- 1987 elections:
  - Alawadin Bandon Jr. (Tawi-Tawi): disqualified in 1990, replaced by Romulo Espaldon
  - Virgilio Robles (Caloocan's 1st): disqualified in 1991, replaced by Romeo Santos
- 1992 elections:
  - Manuel Sanchez (Rizal's 1st) disqualified in 1993, special election won by Gilberto Duavit Sr.
  - Macabangkit Lanto (Lanao del Norte's 2nd) disqualified in 1994, replaced by Mario Hisuler
  - Joker Arroyo (Makati) disqualified in 1995, replaced by Augusto Syjuco Jr., reversed by the Supreme Court in 1995
- 1995 elections:
  - None
- 1998 elections:
  - Girlie Villarosa (Occidental Mindoro): disqualified in 2000, replaced by Ricardo Quintos.
- 2001 elections:
  - Henry Lanot (Pasig): disqualified in 2004, replaced by Noel Cariño
  - Mark Jimenez (Manila's 6th): disqualified in 2003, not replaced
- 2004 elections:
  - Anuar Abubakar (Tawi-Tawi): disqualified in 2006, replaced by Nur Jaafar
- 2007 elections:
  - Danilo Fernandez (Laguna's 1st): disqualified in 2009, reversed by the Supreme Court in 2010.
  - Alvin Sandoval (Malabon/Navotas): disqualified in 2009, replaced by Josephine Lacson-Noel
  - Henry Dueñas (Taguig's 2nd): disqualified in 2010, replaced by Angelito Reyes
- 2010 elections:
  - Lucy Torres-Gomez (Leyte's 4th): ousted in 2013, not replaced
- 2013 elections:
  - Harlin Abayon (Northern Samar's 1st): replaced by Raul Daza, reversed by the Supreme Court in 2016.
  - Philip Pichay (Surigao del Sur's 1st): ousted in 2016, replaced by Mary Elizabeth Delgado-Ty
  - Regina Reyes Mandanas (Marinduque): disqualified in 2016, replaced by Lord Allan Jay Velasco
- 2016 elections:
  - None
- 2019 elections:
  - None
- 2022 elections:
  - None
- 2025 elections:
  - None
