= 2010 Autonomous Region in Muslim Mindanao local elections =

Local elections were held in the Autonomous Region in Muslim Mindanao on May 10, 2010, as part of the 2010 Philippine general election.

== Basilan ==
=== Governor ===
Incumbent governor Jum Jainudin Akbar of Lakas–Kampi–CMD won re-election to a second term.

Candidate	Party	Votes	%
Jum Jainudin Akbar	Lakas–Kampi–CMD	69,350	46.18
Mujiv Hataman	Liberal Party	60,408	40.23
Joel Maturan	Nacionalista Party	18,084	12.04
Abdalun Awilun	Nationalist People's Coalition	1,172	0.78
Eddie Edris	Independent	885	0.59
Fauzul Adzeem Juhur	Independent	274	0.18
Total		150,173	100.00
Valid votes		150,173	93.83
Invalid/blank votes		9,878	6.17
Total votes		160,051	100.00
Lakas–Kampi–CMD hold			
Source: Commission on Elections

=== Vice governor ===
Al Rasheed Sakkalahul of Lakas–Kampi–CMD was elected as vice governor.

Candidate	Party	Votes	%
Al Rasheed Sakkalahul	Lakas–Kampi–CMD	72,236	55.57
Bonnie Abdulaziz Balamo	Liberal Party	26,213	20.16
Gregorio Molina	Nacionalista Party	20,152	15.50
Saddapal Arzad	Independent	5,315	4.09
Bensaleh Sharifah	Independent	2,684	2.06
Hatimil Hassan	Nationalist People's Coalition	1,840	1.42
Urin Yassin	Independent	1,559	1.20
Total		129,999	100.00
Valid votes		129,999	81.22
Invalid/blank votes		30,052	18.78
Total votes		160,051	100.00
Source: Commission on Elections

=== Provincial board ===
The Basilan Provincial Board is composed of 12 board members, 8 of whom are elected.

Party	Votes	%	Seats
Lakas–Kampi–CMD	172,795	49.44	5
Liberal Party	72,014	20.61	1
Nacionalista Party	31,950	9.14	1
Lapiang Manggagawa	9,662	2.76	0
Pwersa ng Masang Pilipino	7,293	2.09	0
Aksyon Demokratiko	3,714	1.06	0
Bagumbayan–VNP	1,191	0.34	0
Independent	50,852	14.55	1
Total	349,471	100.00	8
Total votes	160,051	–	
Source: Commission on Elections

==== 1st district ====
Candidate	Party	Votes	%
Yusop Alano	Lakas–Kampi–CMD	28,790	15.54
Candu Muarip	Lakas–Kampi–CMD	27,277	14.72
Miskuddin Tupay	Lakas–Kampi–CMD	21,067	11.37
Otoh Fernandez	Liberal Party	17,681	9.54
Placido Jilhani	Lakas–Kampi–CMD	15,520	8.38
Nida Dans	Liberal Party	15,377	8.30
Hamsarulla Hadjirul	Lapiang Manggagawa	9,662	5.21
Herminio Montebon	Liberal Party	8,928	4.82
Omar Akbar	Pwersa ng Masang Pilipino	7,293	3.94
Remigio de los Reyes	Nacionalista Party	5,766	3.11
Mario Mamang	Liberal Party	5,529	2.98
Taufic Julkarnain	Independent	4,680	2.53
Felipe Ortega	Nacionalista Party	3,853	2.08
Udasan Dahandal	Nacionalista Party	3,318	1.79
Geronimo Barrientos	Independent	2,779	1.50
Mamih Hussam	Nacionalista Party	2,661	1.44
Abdulsalam Imam Aslion	Independent	1,649	0.89
Aminkadra Tugung	Independent	1,371	0.74
Gomeraldo dela Rama	Bagumbayan–VNP	1,191	0.64
Ronnie Rugasan	Independent	901	0.49
Total		185,293	100.00
Total votes		92,462	–
Source: Commission on Elections

==== 2nd district ====
Candidate	Party	Votes	%
Ronie Hantian	Lakas–Kampi–CMD	31,761	19.35
Munap Pacio	Lakas–Kampi–CMD	28,181	17.16
Bon Salain	Independent	17,629	10.74
Andriel Asalul	Nacionalista Party	16,352	9.96
Abdulatip Tahajid	Lakas–Kampi–CMD	14,936	9.10
Juni Rasheid Ilimin	Liberal Party	13,764	8.38
Noel Baul	Independent	11,287	6.87
Marwan Hataman	Liberal Party	10,735	6.54
Nasser Salain	Lakas–Kampi–CMD	5,263	3.21
Darius Janatul	Independent	4,249	2.59
Ahmad Ibama	Aksyon Demokratiko	3,714	2.26
Abdulkadil Idris	Independent	1,878	1.14
Majang Linggisan	Independent	1,757	1.07
Ambay Sahdin	Independent	1,258	0.77
Alnasser Kamman	Independent	855	0.52
Adzhar Asid	Independent	559	0.34
Total		164,178	100.00
Total votes		67,589	–
Source: Commission on Elections

== Lanao del Sur ==
=== Governor ===
Incumbent governor Mamintal Adiong Jr. of Lakas–Kampi–CMD won re-election to a second term against Ahmadjam Abdulcarim (Independent), Abo Hamad Abdullah (Independent), Omar Ali (Nacionalista Party), Jiamil Dianalan (Lapiang Manggagawa), Muhammadomar Malawad (Independent) and Bashier Manalao (Pwersa ng Masang Pilipino).

=== Vice governor ===
Arsad Marahombsar of Lakas–Kampi–CMD won re-election to a second term against Dimapuno Datu-Ramos (Aksyon Demokratiko), Morsalim Binnotominoray (Independent), Alikhan Dimaro (Independent), Alexander Marmay (Independent), Ameroddin Sarangani (Nacionalista Party) and Paisalin Tago (Liberal Party).

=== Provincial board ===
The Lanao del Sur Provincial Board is composed of 13 board members, 10 of whom are elected.

==== 1st district ====
The following were elected as provincial board members in the 1st district:

- Anouar Abdul Rauf (Independent)
- Alexander Alonto Jr. (Lakas–Kampi–CMD)
- Ashari Diron (Lakas–Kampi–CMD)
- Musa Racman (Nacionalista Party)
- Kamal Macasundig (Lakas–Kampi–CMD)

The following were the other candidates who ran in the provincial board election in the 1st district:

- Mahdi Aal-yahya (Independent)
- Saad Aamate (Independent)
- Alisokrie Abdullah (Independent)
- Hussein Abofarhanomar (Nacionalista Party)
- Sohair Adapun (Independent)
- Paskhan Alonto (Independent)
- Fahad Ansao (Nacionalista Party)
- Suwaib Ariong (Nacionalista Party)
- Abdulhadi Badron (Independent)
- Edris Bascara (Lakas–Kampi–CMD)
- Casan Cana (Independent)
- Alinog Disamburun (Liberal Party)
- Omar Macapandi (Lakas–Kampi–CMD)
- Bontalis Mala (PDP–Laban)
- Jamael Mangca (Independent)
- Dariday Mimbalawag (Independent)
- Aisa Munder (Independent)
- Rielani Rakiin (Independent)

==== 2nd district ====
The following were elected as provincial board members in the 2nd district:

- Amir-Oden Balindong (Lakas–Kampi–CMD)
- Abdul Harris Macacua (Liberal Party)
- Macapandi Mindalano (Independent)
- Taha Macapodi (Lakas–Kampi–CMD)
- Ansary Maongco (Nacionalista Party)

The following were the other candidates who ran in the provincial board election in the 2nd district:

- Ibrahim Abdullatif (Independent)
- Tasman Abutasnima (Nacionalista Party)
- Arab Ampaso (Nacionalista Party)
- Parok Balt (Independent)
- Lacsa Cali (Nacionalista Party)
- Muammar Cali (Independent)
- Raga Diamaoden (Independent)
- Hamdan Dimaporo (Independent)
- Daud Disoma (Independent)
- Abduljabbar Doble (Partido Demokratiko Sosyalista ng Pilipinas)
- Abdulpatah Gubat (Nacionalista Party)
- Musa Macabangkit (Partido Demokratiko Sosyalista ng Pilipinas)
- Ismael Maminasacan (Ompia Party)
- Amron Maruhom (Independent)
- Madraop Pamaloy (Independent)
- Moshmerah Panbangan (Independent)
- Nasser Romato (Independent)

== Cotabato City ==
=== Mayor ===
Incumbent mayor Muslimin Sema of the Nationalist People's Coalition ran for vice mayor. Japal Guiani Jr. of Pwersa ng Masang Pilipino was elected as mayor.

Candidate	Party	Votes	%
Japal Guiani Jr.	Pwersa ng Masang Pilipino	21,000	44.79
Bimbo Sinsuat Sr.	Nacionalista Party	17,581	37.50
Baisendig Dilangalen	Independent	8,210	17.51
Hadlji Akmad Dadang	Independent	95	0.20
Total		46,886	100.00
Valid votes		46,886	97.41
Invalid/blank votes		1,246	2.59
Total votes		48,132	100.00
Pwersa ng Masang Pilipino gain from Nationalist People's Coalition hold			
Source: Commission on Elections

=== Vice mayor ===
Mayor Muslimin Sema of the Nationalist People's Coalition was elected as vice mayor.

Candidate	Party	Votes	%
Muslimin Sema	Nationalist People's Coalition	22,293	49.20
Anwar Malang	Liberal Party	15,258	33.68
Linda Ampatuan	Independent	7,757	17.12
Total		45,308	100.00
Valid votes		45,308	94.13
Invalid/blank votes		2,824	5.87
Total votes		48,132	100.00
Source: Commission on Elections

=== City council ===
The Cotabato City Council is composed of 12 councilors, 10 of whom are elected.

Party	Votes	%	Seats
Pwersa ng Masang Pilipino	123,806	34.81	4
Nationalist People's Coalition	68,896	19.37	4
Nacionalista Party	60,723	17.07	1
Liberal Party	33,311	9.36	0
Independent	68,976	19.39	1
Total	355,712	100.00	10
Total votes	48,132	–	
Source: Commission on Elections

Candidate	Party	Votes	%
Graham Nazer Dumama	Pwersa ng Masang Pilipino	21,970	6.18
Eduardo Rabago	Pwersa ng Masang Pilipino	21,139	5.94
Marino Ridao	Pwersa ng Masang Pilipino	19,652	5.52
Wilfrido Bueno	Pwersa ng Masang Pilipino	18,874	5.31
Abdullah Andang	Nationalist People's Coalition	18,406	5.17
Madatu Datumanong	Nationalist People's Coalition	18,393	5.17
Froilan Melendrez	Independent	17,732	4.98
Florante Formento	Nacionalista Party	17,450	4.91
Sukarno Sema	Nationalist People's Coalition	16,432	4.62
Kusin Taha	Nationalist People's Coalition	15,665	4.40
Cynthia Costales	Nacionalista Party	14,794	4.16
Jonathan Cortez	Pwersa ng Masang Pilipino	12,304	3.46
Datu Pulna Utto	Nacionalista Party	10,617	2.98
Christina Chua	Liberal Party	9,772	2.75
Arsenio Lim	Pwersa ng Masang Pilipino	9,311	2.62
Richard Cenas	Liberal Party	9,176	2.58
Troy Eric Cordero	Nacionalista Party	8,906	2.50
Abdulnasser Badrudin	Pwersa ng Masang Pilipino	8,781	2.47
Rasul Ismael	Independent	8,106	2.28
Saguila Palacala	Independent	8,010	2.25
Omarkhalid Ampatuan	Pwersa ng Masang Pilipino	7,494	2.11
Hannibal Bandila	Nacionalista Party	7,339	2.06
Maria Mikkoh Ortouste-Samba	Liberal Party	7,327	2.06
Abed Ayunan	Independent	7,110	2.00
Jamalulkiram Soliaman	Independent	5,289	1.49
Badrudin Ali	Independent	4,709	1.32
Anwarudin Emblawa	Pwersa ng Masang Pilipino	4,281	1.20
Allan Ali	Liberal Party	3,806	1.07
Cirilo Guerrero	Independent	3,323	0.93
Abdilah Sumndad	Independent	3,263	0.92
Datuneil Kusin	Liberal Party	3,230	0.91
Jurkaris Buan	Independent	2,675	0.75
Payakan Tilendo	Independent	2,387	0.67
Romualdo Degala	Independent	1,684	0.47
Naguib Sinarimbo	Nacionalista Party	1,617	0.45
Toto Adil	Independent	1,469	0.41
Johariz Ampatuan	Independent	1,089	0.31
Joseph Khalipsar Cuan	Independent	872	0.25
Osmena Dalandas	Independent	734	0.21
Elsie Oreludos	Independent	524	0.15
Total		355,712	100.00
Total votes		48,132	–
Source: Commission on Elections

== Maguindanao ==
=== Governor ===
Buluan vice mayor Esmael Mangudadatu of Lakas–Kampi–CMD was elected as governor.

Candidate	Party	Votes	%
Esmael Mangudadatu	Lakas–Kampi–CMD	153,706	42.31
Datu Ombra Sinsuat	Bagumbayan–VNP	141,001	38.81
Midpantao Midtimbang	Pwersa ng Masang Pilipino	68,586	18.88
Total		363,293	100.00
Valid votes		363,293	94.58
Invalid/blank votes		20,813	5.42
Total votes		384,106	100.00
Source: Commission on Elections

=== Vice governor ===
Ismael Mastura of Lakas–Kampi–CMD was elected as vice governor.

Candidate	Party	Votes	%
Ismael Mastura	Lakas–Kampi–CMD	173,471	51.43
Andal Ampatuan Sr.	Independent	142,783	42.33
Ma-Arouph Candao	Islamic Party of the Philippines	17,208	5.10
Shaydee Abutazil	Independent	3,824	1.13
Total		337,286	100.00
Valid votes		337,286	87.81
Invalid/blank votes		46,820	12.19
Total votes		384,106	100.00
Source: Commission on Elections

=== Provincial board ===
The Maguindanao Provincial Board is composed of 14 board members, 10 of whom are elected.

Party	Votes	%	Seats
Lakas–Kampi–CMD	364,552	30.69	0
Bagumbayan–VNP	202,265	17.03	2
Aksyon Demokratiko	60,334	5.08	1
Nationalist People's Coalition	18,040	1.52	0
Pwersa ng Masang Pilipino	6,330	0.53	0
Independent	536,195	45.15	7
Total	1,187,716	100.00	10
Total votes	384,106	–	
Source: Commission on Elections

==== 1st district ====
Candidate	Party	Votes	%
Talib Abo Jr.	Independent	90,179	14.46
Russman Sinsuat	Bagumbayan–VNP	83,435	13.38
Asnawi Limbona	Independent	79,761	12.79
Nashrullah Imam	Bagumbayan–VNP	78,256	12.55
Bocari Dagalangit	Aksyon Demokratiko	60,334	9.68
Raul Tomawis	Lakas–Kampi–CMD	55,909	8.97
Saqqaf Maik	Lakas–Kampi–CMD	54,767	8.78
Rosalim Bangon	Lakas–Kampi–CMD	28,988	4.65
Michael Sinsuat	Lakas–Kampi–CMD	28,412	4.56
Abdulbayan Candao	Lakas–Kampi–CMD	27,014	4.33
Mastura Abas	Nationalist People's Coalition	18,040	2.89
Armando Lidasan	Independent	7,384	1.18
Muslimin Kasim	Independent	3,832	0.61
Alonto Daudie	Independent	3,571	0.57
Ebrahim Kasan	Pwersa ng Masang Pilipino	2,539	0.41
Kamad Dinggo	Independent	1,111	0.18
Total		623,532	100.00
Total votes		191,299	–
Source: Commission on Elections

==== 2nd district ====
Candidate	Party	Votes	%
Ibrahim Paglas IV	Independent	70,909	12.57
Datu Sarip Ampatuan	Independent	65,831	11.67
Sajid Islam Ampatuan	Independent	65,371	11.59
Puti Ampatuan	Independent	60,180	10.67
Michael Midtimbang	Independent	50,817	9.01
Malumpil Utto	Lakas–Kampi–CMD	41,535	7.36
Jaafar Apollo Matalam	Bagumbayan–VNP	40,574	7.19
Montano Paglala	Lakas–Kampi–CMD	36,561	6.48
Usop Montawal	Lakas–Kampi–CMD	35,641	6.32
Mando Mamalinta Sr.	Lakas–Kampi–CMD	32,905	5.83
Edres Kasim	Lakas–Kampi–CMD	22,820	4.04
Abdulmanan Manalasal	Independent	17,496	3.10
Datuwata Adzis	Independent	14,718	2.61
Vicente Salde Camsa	Independent	5,035	0.89
Abonawas Nalab	Pwersa ng Masang Pilipino	3,791	0.67
Total		564,184	100.00
Total votes		200,089	–
Source: Commission on Elections

== Sulu ==
=== Governor ===
Incumbent governor Abdusakur Mahail Tan of Lakas–Kampi–CMD was re-elected to a second term.

Candidate	Party	Votes	%
Abdusakur Mahail Tan	Lakas–Kampi–CMD	110,715	50.78
Abdulmunir Mundoc Arbison	Nationalist People's Coalition	86,405	39.63
Nur Misuari	Bangon Pilipinas	19,625	9.00
Sahiron Salim	Independent	937	0.43
Kadra Masihul	Independent	232	0.11
Idjal Alawi	Independent	89	0.04
Nadia Alih	Independent	35	0.02
Total		218,038	100.00
Valid votes		218,038	95.24
Invalid/blank votes		10,903	4.76
Total votes		228,941	100.00
Source: ibanangayon.ph

=== Vice governor ===
Benjamin Loong of the Nationalist People's Coalition was elected as vice governor.

Candidate	Party	Votes	%
Benjamin Loong	Nationalist People's Coalition	113,678	54.74
Abdel Anni	Lakas–Kampi–CMD	90,778	43.71
Sondosiea Abdurajak	Independent	2,528	1.22
Benhar Hashim	Independent	363	0.17
Ahmad Amil	Independent	321	0.15
Total		207,668	100.00
Valid votes		207,668	90.71
Invalid/blank votes		21,273	9.29
Total votes		228,941	100.00
Source: ibanangayon.ph

=== Provincial board ===
The Sulu Provincial Board is composed of 13 board members, 10 of whom are elected.

Party	Votes	%	Seats
Lakas–Kampi–CMD	363,075	46.92	5
Nationalist People's Coalition	344,080	44.46	5
Pwersa ng Masang Pilipino	32,160	4.16	0
Liberal Party	18,113	2.34	0
Alpha Omega 9K Party	1,993	0.26	0
Independent	14,455	1.87	0
Total	773,876	100.00	10
Total votes	228,941	–	
Source: ibanangayon.ph

==== 1st district ====
Candidate	Party	Votes	%
Alkramer Izquierdo	Lakas–Kampi–CMD	65,396	15.01
Ismunlatip Suhui	Lakas–Kampi–CMD	53,764	12.34
Al-Khadar Loong	Lakas–Kampi–CMD	50,882	11.68
Darren Limpasan	Lakas–Kampi–CMD	47,791	10.97
Basaron Burahan	Lakas–Kampi–CMD	43,904	10.08
Akili Palahuddin	Nationalist People's Coalition	38,610	8.86
Siyang Loong	Nationalist People's Coalition	26,480	6.08
Benhajar Tulawie	Nationalist People's Coalition	25,459	5.84
Ahmad Nanoh	Nationalist People's Coalition	21,763	5.00
Abijar-E Salahuddin	Liberal Party	18,113	4.16
Mohammad Amir Sahipa	Nationalist People's Coalition	17,285	3.97
Jackar Jikiri	Independent	5,493	1.26
Ruben Tingkahan	Pwersa ng Masang Pilipino	5,196	1.19
Muhaimin Salapuddin	Pwersa ng Masang Pilipino	5,086	1.17
Abdulganih Jainal	Pwersa ng Masang Pilipino	2,429	0.56
Eyang Tomoay	Pwersa ng Masang Pilipino	2,072	0.48
Titina Asla	Alpha Omega 9K Party	1,993	0.46
Sherasad Asaral	Pwersa ng Masang Pilipino	1,980	0.45
Sharif Sabrie Jul	Pwersa ng Masang Pilipino	1,970	0.45
Total		435,666	100.00
Total votes		126,864	–
Source: ibanangayon.ph

==== 2nd district ====
Candidate	Party	Votes	%
Alnur Arbison	Nationalist People's Coalition	42,159	12.47
Alganarham Adam	Nationalist People's Coalition	36,800	10.88
Nasser Daud Jr.	Nationalist People's Coalition	32,889	9.72
Onnih Ammad	Nationalist People's Coalition	29,936	8.85
Lukman Omar	Nationalist People's Coalition	28,271	8.36
Al-Hussein Caluang	Nationalist People's Coalition	25,952	7.67
Ayob Pulahong	Lakas–Kampi–CMD	23,934	7.08
Javier Sakandal	Lakas–Kampi–CMD	22,261	6.58
Khalil Hajibin	Lakas–Kampi–CMD	19,553	5.78
Sonnyboy Appang	Nationalist People's Coalition	18,476	5.46
Hector Buclao	Lakas–Kampi–CMD	18,147	5.37
Mohammad Sarapuddin	Lakas–Kampi–CMD	17,443	5.16
Jul Omar	Pwersa ng Masang Pilipino	4,623	1.37
Lilia Laja	Independent	4,556	1.35
Jurupal Sabtula	Pwersa ng Masang Pilipino	3,033	0.90
Altohami Nasirul	Pwersa ng Masang Pilipino	2,610	0.77
Sakib Amdain	Independent	2,582	0.76
Mahalail Ibno	Pwersa ng Masang Pilipino	1,614	0.48
Aksam Tajirul	Pwersa ng Masang Pilipino	1,547	0.46
Timhar Halipa	Independent	1,117	0.33
Jamsuri Sawad	Independent	707	0.21
Total		338,210	100.00
Total votes		102,077	–
Source: ibanangayon.ph

== Tawi-Tawi ==
=== Governor ===
Incumbent governor Sadikul Sahali of Lakas–Kampi–CMD was re-elected to a third term.

Candidate	Party	Votes	%
Sadikul Sahali	Lakas–Kampi–CMD	59,417	51.21
Rashidin Matba	Nationalist People's Coalition	56,013	48.28
Abdurajad Juaini	Pwersa ng Masang Pilipino	332	0.29
Bagani Idanan	Independent	253	0.22
Total		116,015	100.00
Valid votes		116,015	96.53
Invalid/blank votes		4,175	3.47
Total votes		120,190	100.00
Source: Commission on Elections

=== Vice governor ===
Ruby Sahali of Lakas–Kampi–CMD was elected as vice governor.

Candidate	Party	Votes	%
Ruby Sahali	Lakas–Kampi–CMD	61,005	56.32
Jilkasi Usman	Nationalist People's Coalition	45,127	41.67
Gabra Abdurahman	Independent	2,177	2.01
Total		108,309	100.00
Valid votes		108,309	90.11
Invalid/blank votes		11,881	9.89
Total votes		120,190	100.00
Source: Commission on Elections

=== Provincial board ===
The Tawi-Tawi Provincial Board is composed of 14 board members, 8 of whom are elected.

Party	Votes	%	Seats
Lakas–Kampi–CMD	184,903	51.29	6
Nationalist People's Coalition	96,868	26.87	1
Liberal PartyPDP–Laban	21,518	5.97	1
PDP–Laban	1,917	0.53	0
Independent	55,303	15.34	0
Total	360,509	100.00	8
Total votes	120,190	–	
Source: Commission on Elections

==== 1st district ====
Candidate	Party	Votes	%
Allan Ahaja	Nationalist People's Coalition	35,708	18.37
Al-Hamar Tamburani	Lakas–Kampi–CMD	25,823	13.28
Renil Samsuya	Lakas–Kampi–CMD	25,156	12.94
Myrna Ajihil	Lakas–Kampi–CMD	22,874	11.77
Ganda Jaani	Lakas–Kampi–CMD	19,227	9.89
Abdurasad Aming	Independent	10,334	5.32
Yacob Harun	Independent	9,824	5.05
Shalibar Abubakar	Nationalist People's Coalition	9,042	4.65
Ismael Sali	Independent	8,069	4.15
Aguil Samsaraji	Nationalist People's Coalition	5,276	2.71
Elias Malande	Nationalist People's Coalition	4,369	2.25
George Malbun	Nationalist People's Coalition	4,108	2.11
Ernie Alie	Independent	3,628	1.87
Ismael Beyuta	Liberal Party	2,265	1.17
Bonsan Go Jr.	Independent	1,967	1.01
Irving Jukni	PDP–Laban	1,917	0.99
Indalen Amilbahar	Independent	1,805	0.93
Zenaida Miranda	Independent	1,581	0.81
Queensita Saluan	Independent	904	0.46
Faizal Ibnohaji	Independent	532	0.27
Total		194,409	100.00
Total votes		68,222	–
Source: Commission on Elections

==== 2nd district ====
Candidate	Party	Votes	%
Nur Omar	Lakas–Kampi–CMD	26,079	15.70
Al-Khalid Abdulmunap	Lakas–Kampi–CMD	25,394	15.29
Algarad Lipae	Lakas–Kampi–CMD	22,302	13.43
Rodolfo Bawasanta	Liberal Party	19,253	11.59
Dhes Mangona	Lakas–Kampi–CMD	18,048	10.87
Rhomar Matolo	Nationalist People's Coalition	15,974	9.62
Albasir Sangka	Nationalist People's Coalition	12,118	7.30
Tahir Sulayman	Independent	11,726	7.06
Abdulhan Astarani	Nationalist People's Coalition	10,273	6.18
Abduljalil Ibnohajil	Independent	3,623	2.18
Sawadjaan Abubakar	Independent	1,310	0.79
Total		166,100	100.00
Total votes		51,968	–
Source: Commission on Elections
