= Ruby Sahali =

Filipino politician

The Honorable Ruby Sahali

Member of the Philippine House of Representatives from Tawi-Tawi's lone district
- In office June 30, 2013 – June 30, 2019
- Preceded by: Nur Jaafar
- Succeeded by: Rashidin Matba

Personal details
- Born: April 29, 1970 (age 56)
- Party: Aksyon (2024–present)
- Other political affiliations: PDP–Laban (2016–2024); Liberal (2012–2016)

Ruby Sahali is a Filipino politician who represented the lone district of Tawi-Tawi in the Autonomous Region in Muslim Mindanao from 2013 until her re-election defeat in 2019.

She is the eldest daughter of former Tawi-Tawi Governor Sadikul Sahali and the sister of Nurbert Sahali and former mayor of Panglima Sugala, Rejie Sahali-Generale.
