= Francisco Sumulong =

Filipino lawyer and politician (1918–2004)

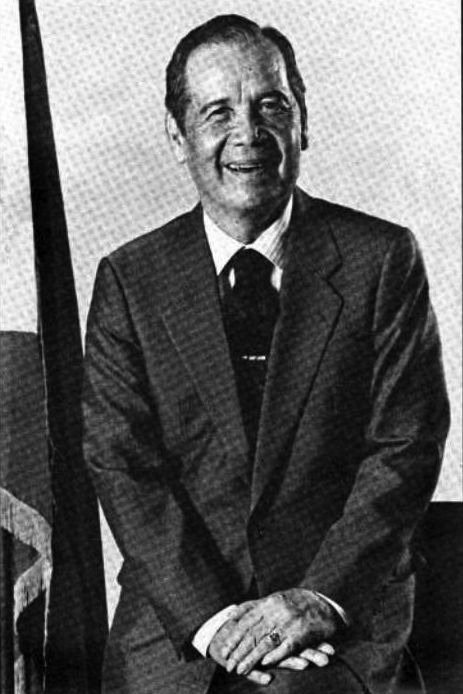
- Sumulong's official portrait during the 8th Congress

House Majority Leader
- In office July 23, 1987 – June 30, 1992
- Preceded by: Jose Roño (as Majority Leader of the Batasang Pambansa)
- Succeeded by: Ronaldo Zamora

Member of the Philippine House of Representatives from Rizal
- In office June 30, 1987 – June 30, 1992
- Preceded by: District reestablished (seat last held by Neptali Gonzales in 1973)
- Succeeded by: Manuel Sanchez
- Constituency: 1st district
- In office December 30, 1957 – December 30, 1961
- Preceded by: Serafín Salvador
- Succeeded by: Jovito Salonga
- Constituency: 2nd district

Member of the Batasang Pambansa from Rizal
- In office June 30, 1984 – March 25, 1986 Serving with Emigdio Tanjuatco Jr.

Member of the 1971 Constitutional Convention from Rizal's 2nd district
- In office June 1, 1971 – December 1, 1972 Serving with Pacifico Ortiz, Gilberto Duavit, Emilio de la Paz Jr., and Augusto Sanchez

Personal details
- Born: December 3, 1918 Antipolo, Rizal, Philippine Islands
- Died: October 5, 2004 (aged 85)
- Party: Lakas (1992–2004)
- Other political affiliations: LDP (1988–1992); LnB (1987–1988); PDP–Laban (1987–1988); UNIDO (1984–1987); Nacionalista (1957–1961)
- Spouse: Milagros Reyes
- Children: 7
- Parent(s): Juan Sumulong (father); Maria Salome Sumulong (mother)
- Relatives: Lorenzo Sumulong (brother); Corazon Aquino (niece); Josephine C. Reyes (niece); Peping Cojuangco (nephew); Noynoy Aquino (grandnephew); Kris Aquino (grandniece)

Francisco Sumulong Sr. (December 3, 1918 – October 5, 2004) was a Filipino lawyer and politician who served as a member of the House of Representatives, representing Rizal's 2nd district from 1957 to 1961 and its 1st district from 1987 to 1992. He was the House majority leader in the 8th Congress from 1987 to 1992.

== Early life and education ==
Sumulong was born on December 3, 1918, in Antipolo, Rizal, to former senator Juan Sumulong and Maria Salome Sumulong, a distant cousin of his father. He completed his secondary education and earned a Bachelor of Science degree from De La Salle University, a Bachelor of Laws degree from Arellano University, and pursued postgraduate legal studies at Harvard Law School. He placed ninth in the 1947 Philippine Bar Examinations.

== Career ==
Sumulong's first elective office was in the 4th Congress, when he was elected to the House of Representatives as the representative of Rizal's 2nd district. He later represented the district in the 1971 Constitutional Convention as one of its delegates.

In 1984, he was elected as one of the opposition members of the Regular Batasang Pambansa.

Following the reestablishment of the House of Representatives in 1987, Sumulong was elected to represent Rizal's 1st district and was subsequently chosen as the chamber's majority floor leader. He served until the end of his term in 1992.

He made an unsuccessful bid for the Senate in 1992 under the Lakas–NUCD ticket, placing 31st among the 152 candidates for the 24 contested seats.

In 1994, Sumulong attempted to return to the House of Representatives in a special election for Rizal's 1st district but was defeated by Gilberto Duavit.

Sumulong died on October 5, 2004.

== Personal life ==
Sumulong was married to Milagros Reyes, with whom he had seven children. He was the son of former senator Juan Sumulong, the brother of former senator Lorenzo Sumulong, and the uncle of former president Corazon Aquino through her mother Demetria Sumulong.

== Electoral history ==
Electoral history of Francisco Sumulong
Year	Office	Party	Votes received				Result
Year	Office	Party	Total	%	P.	Swing	Result
1957	Representative (Rizal–2nd)	Nacionalista	—N/a	—N/a	1st	—N/a	Won
1984	Assemblyman (Rizal)	PDP–Laban	198,432	—N/a	1st	—N/a	Won
1987	Representative (Rizal–1st)	PDP–Laban	—N/a	—N/a	1st	—N/a	Won
1994	Representative (Rizal–1st)	Lakas–NUCD	38,953	30.17%	2nd	—N/a	Lost
1992	Senator of the Philippines	Lakas–NUCD	3,167,838	13.06%	31st	—N/a	Lost

House of Representatives of the Philippines
Preceded by Jose Roño (as Majority Leader of the Batasang Pambansa)	House Majority Leader; July 23, 1987 – June 30, 1992	Succeeded by Ronaldo Zamora
Preceded by District reestablished (seat last held by Neptali Gonzales in 1973)	Member of the Philippine House of Representatives for Rizal's 1st district June 30, 1987 – June 30, 1992	Succeeded by Manuel Sanchez
New district	Member of the Batasang Pambansa from Rizal; June 30, 1984 – March 25, 1986; With: Pacifico Ortiz, Gilberto Duavit, Emilio de la Paz Jr., and Augusto Sanchez	District abolished
Preceded by Serafin Salvador	Member of the Philippine House of Representatives for Rizal's at-large district December 30, 1957 – December 30, 1961	Succeeded by Jovito Salonga
