= Nur Jaafar =

Filipino lawyer and politician (born 1944)

Nur Jaafar GCrGH
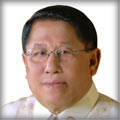
- Official portrait, 2010

Deputy Speaker of the House of Representatives of the Philippines for Mindanao
- In office January 24, 2001 – June 30, 2001
- Speaker: Feliciano Belmonte Jr.
- Preceded by: Daisy Avance Fuentes
- Succeeded by: Abdulgani Salapuddin

Member of the Philippine House of Representatives for Tawi-Tawi's at-large district
- In office August 3, 2006 – June 30, 2013
- Preceded by: Anuar Abubakar
- Succeeded by: Ruby Sahali
- In office June 30, 1992 – June 30, 2001
- Preceded by: Romulo Espaldon
- Succeeded by: Soraya Jaafar

Governor of Tawi-Tawi
- In office 1976–1986
- Preceded by: Romulo Espaldon
- Succeeded by: Almarim Tillah

Vice Governor of Tawi-Tawi
- In office 1973–1976
- Governor: Romulo Espaldon
- Preceded by: Mohamad Amilhasan
- Succeeded by: Hadjiril Matba

Personal details
- Born: Nur Gaspar Jaafar; July 1, 1944
- Party: NPC (2010–present)
- Other political affiliations: Lakas (1995–1998; 2004–2010); LAMMP (1998–2001); LDP (1992–1995); KBL (1980–1986)

Nur "Nong" Gaspar Jaafar GCrGH (born July 1, 1944) is a Filipino lawyer and politician who served as a member of the Philippine House of Representatives for Tawi-Tawi's at-large congressional district from 1992 to 2001 and 2006 to 2013. From January to June 2001, he briefly held the position of deputy speaker of the House of Representatives. Currently a member of the Nationalist People's Coalition, he was previously vice governor of Tawi-Tawi from 1973 to 1976, and governor from 1976 to 1986.

== Early life ==
Jaafar was born on July 1, 1944, in the province of Tawi-Tawi.

== Career ==
Jaafar (seated, right) with representatives from the ARMM in the 14th Congress

Jaafar is a lawyer by profession. In 1973, upon the conversion of Tawi-Tawi into a new province after being part of Sulu, Romulo Espaldon was appointed provincial military governor, with Mohamad Amilhasan as vice governor. Jaafar later replaced Amilhasan as officer-in-charge vice governor after he joined the regional Bureau of Internal Revenue office in Zamboanga City.

Jaafar was later appointed governor in 1976, after the Election Code of 1971 provided for the end of the terms of local elective officials in 1975, as endorsed by Espaldon and former Moro National Liberation Front commander Hadjiril Matba to President Ferdinand Marcos. Jaafar would later be elected to a full term in 1980, serving until 1986.

Jaafar later ran for the House of Representatives for Tawi-Tawi's lone district seat in 1992, and was reelected two more times in 1995 and 1998 before being term-limited. On May 13, 1998, Jaafar was conferred the Grand Cross of the Order of the Golden Heart by President Fidel V. Ramos.

In January 2001, after a leadership change following the resignation of Arnulfo Fuentebella as speaker of the House, Jaafar was elected deputy speaker, replacing Daisy Avance Fuentes, and served until the end of his congressional term. He was succeeded in his seat by his daughter Soraya Jaafar.

He later sought a new term in 2004 after an election cycle, but placed second to Anuar Abubakar. Jaafar filed an electoral protest against Abubakar before the House Electoral Tribunal on allegations of fraud, ballot substitution, and other irregularities. The tribunal found that Jaafar received 27,257 valid votes compared to Abubakar's total of 25,705, and it later annulled Abubakar's proclamation on June 30, 2006, and declared Jaafar as the duly elected representative. Abubakar elevated the decision to the Supreme Court, which ruled that the tribunal did not act with grave abuse of discretion. Jaafar assumed his seat in August 2006. He was reelected twice, in 2007 and 2010.

Jaafar attempted to return to politics during his 2013 gubernatorial bid under the Nationalist People's Coalition, but lost to incumbent governor Sadikul Sahali's son Nurbert Sahali. He has since retired from public office.

== Electoral history ==
Electoral history of Nur Jaafar
Year	Office	Party	Votes received				Result
Year	Office	Party	Total	%	P.	Swing	Result
1992	Representative (Tawi-Tawi)	LDP	20,457	34.27%	1st	—N/a	Won
1995	Representative (Tawi-Tawi)	Lakas	30,535	40.56%	1st	+6.29	Won
1998	Representative (Tawi-Tawi)	Lakas	39,581	—N/a	1st	—N/a	Won
2004	Representative (Tawi-Tawi)	Lakas	27,257	—N/a	1st	—N/a	Won
2007	Representative (Tawi-Tawi)	Lakas	51,593	—N/a	1st	—N/a	Won
2010	Representative (Tawi-Tawi)	Lakas	58,552	52.95%	1st	—N/a	Won
1980	Governor of Tawi-Tawi	KBL	—N/a	—N/a	1st	—N/a	Won
2013	Governor of Tawi-Tawi	NPC	12,303	14.24%	3rd	—N/a	Lost

== Honors ==
=== National honors ===
- Grand Cross (Maringal na Krus) of the Order of the Golden Heart

House of Representatives of the Philippines
Preceded by Daisy Avance Fuentes	Deputy Speaker of the House of Representatives of the Philippines for Mindanao; 2001	Succeeded by Abdulgani Salapuddin
Preceded by Anuar Abubakar	Member of the Philippine House of Representatives for Tawi-Tawi's at-large district 2006–2013	Succeeded by Ruby Sahali
Preceded by Romulo Espaldon	Member of the Philippine House of Representatives for Tawi-Tawi's at-large district 1992–2001	Succeeded by Soraya Jaafar
Political offices
Preceded by Romulo Espaldon	Governor of Tawi-Tawi; 1976–1986	Succeeded by Almarim Tillah
Preceded by Mohamad Amilhasan	Vice Governor of Tawi-Tawi; 1973–1976	Succeeded by Hadjiril Matba
