= Rosendo Balinas Jr. =

Filipino chess grandmaster (1941–1998)

Personal information
- Born: September 10, 1941
- Died: September 24, 1998 (aged 57)

Chess career
- Country: Philippines
- Title: Grandmaster (1976)
- Peak rating: 2440 (January 1978)

Rosendo Carreon Balinas Jr. (September 10, 1941 – September 24, 1998) was a chess grandmaster from the Philippines. FIDE awarded him the International Master title in 1975 and the International Grandmaster title in 1976. He was Philippines' second chess grandmaster. Balinas was a lawyer by profession, as well as an award-winning chess writer and journalist. He also unsuccessfully ran for representative of Rizal's 1st district in the 1994 special election.

== Chess career ==
Balinas vs. Fischer, Manila 1967

Position: c8 black rook, d8 black knight, f8 black king, d7 white rook, h7 white rook, d6 black pawn, g6 black pawn, a5 black pawn, d5 black pawn, g5 white pawn, d4 black rook, f4 white pawn, h3 white pawn, a2 white pawn, h2 white king

Final position

Balinas was considered the strongest Asian player during the 1960s and 1970s, before the emergence of compatriot Eugenio Torre. Balinas won international chess tournaments in Hong Kong, Singapore, Manila, and Odessa, USSR during the period. At the 1966 17th Chess Olympiad in Havana, Cuba, Balinas scored 15½ points out of 20 games (.775) and was awarded the individual silver medal award, behind gold medalist, former world champion Mikhail Tal, who scored 11 points out of 13 games (.846). In the 1967 Meralco "Beat Bobby Fischer" match series in Manila, of the top 10 Filipino players, Balinas was the only then Philippine national master to hold the future world champion to a draw:

R. C. Balinas – R. J. Fischer, Manila 1967. Opening "Sicilian, Najdorf, Zagreb (Fianchetto) Variation"

1.e4 c5 2.Nf3 d6 3.d4 cxd4 4.Nxd4 Nf6 5.Nc3 a6 6.g3 g6 7.Bg2 Bg7 8.O-O O-O 9.h3 Bd7 10.Nde2 Nc6 11.b3 b5 12.Be3 Qc8 13.Kh2 Qc7 14.Nd5 Nxd5 15.exd5 Nd8 16.Bd4 Rc8 17.Bxg7 Kxg7 18.Qd4+ Kg8 19.c3 e5 20.dxe6 fxe6 21.Rad1 Nf7 22.f4 Qc5 23.Qxc5 Rxc5 24.Rd3 Rfc8 25.Rfd1 a5 26.g4 Kf8 27.Re3 Ke7 28.Bd5 Kf6 29.g5+ Ke7 30.c4 Nd8 31.Nd4 bxc4 32.bxc4 Kf7 33.Rde1 exd5 34.Re7+ Kf8 35.Rxd7 Rxc4 36.Ree7 Rxd4 37.Rxh7 Kg8 38.Rhg7+ Kf8 39.Rh7 ½–½ http://www.chessgames.com/perl/chessgame?gid=1044624

Balinas was a seven-time Philippine chess champion, winning the Philippine National Championship and the Philippine Open Chess Championships. He defended his title and shared first place at the Meralco-sponsored 1968 Philippine Open championship with world championship candidate Yugoslav grandmaster Svetozar Gligorić.

In 1975, then-IM Balinas achieved a 5-5 score at the Manila Marlboro Classic International Chess Tournament, one-half point short of the grandmaster norm, tying with Gligorich for 6th-7th place. Balinas defeated world championship candidates Lev Polugaevsky of USSR and Bent Larsen of Denmark, as well as the Czech-American grandmaster Lubomir Kavalek.

== Winner at Odessa and grandmaster in 1976 ==
Balinas achieved his greatest victory at the 1976 Odessa International Tournament, winning with a 10–4 score. Balinas was undefeated against all Soviet opponents, and a point ahead of Lev Alburt, and former Soviet champion Vladimir Savon.

Bobby Ang, a Philippine chess columnist of Indo Chess and Philippine Business World, recounted in his Chess Piece column:

"Vladimir Savon, the Absolute Russian Chess champion pre-tournament favorite, had been upset in the second round by Tseitlin and it was Balinas who jumped into the lead scoring 5/6. Savon gave chase and three rounds before the end of the tournament the two leaders met. The Philippine Chess Champion Balinas' decisive win over the Soviet Champion was considered to be the turning point of the tournament.

Balinas, Rosendo Carreon, Philippines (2365) – Savon, Vladimir A USSR (2545) Odessa, USSR, 1976. Benoni, Classical Defense.

1.d4 Nf6 2.c4 c5 3.d5 e6 4.Nc3 exd5 5.cxd5 d6 6.e4 g6 7.Nf3 Bg7 8.Be2 0-0 9.0-0 Nbd7 10.a4 Qe7 11.Nd2 a6 12.f4 Rb8 13.Kh1 b6 14.Nc4 Nxe4 15.Nxe4 Qxe4 16.Nxd6 Qe7 17.Nxc8 Rbxc8 18.Bxa6 Rcd8 19.Qb3 Nf6 20.Qxb6 Rxd5 21.Qb3 Rd4 22.a5 Ne4 23.Qf3 c4 24.Be3 Rd3 25.Rfe1 Bxb2 26.Bxc4 Rc3 27.Rab1 Rxc4 28.Rxb2 Qa3 29.Rb5 Re8 30.Re5 Rxe5 31.fxe5 Qxa5 32.Rf1 Qd5 33.Bh6 Rc3 34.Qf4 g5 35.Bxg5 Rc6 36.Bf6 Nxf6 37.exf6 h6 38.Qxh6 1-0 http://www.chessgames.com/perl/chessgame?gid=1331492

There were two short draws in the final rounds, vs Bronstein and Tringov. Balinas thereby became the first foreign player to win an international tournament in the Soviet Union since World Chess Champion José Raúl Capablanca's win in Moscow, 1936 and GM Reuben Fine's wins in Leningrad, 1937 and Moscow, 1937.

As a result of his victory in Odessa, FIDE awarded Balinas the International Chess Grandmaster title.

== More games ==
Another of Bobby Ang's excellent article and analysis of Balinas' "invigorating upset win" over GM Luděk Pachman, a former Czechoslovak champion who emigrated and played for West Germany during the 1976 Haifa Olympiad.

Pachman, Luděk (2520) - Balinas, Rosendo Carreon (2365) [E14] Haifa Olympiad (Men) (5), 30.10.1976

1.d4 Nf6 2.c4 e6 3.Nf3 b6 4.e3 Bb7 5.Bd3 c5 6.0–0 Be7 7.Nc3 cxd4 [It is time for Black to resolve the situation in the center. Otherwise 7...0–0 8.d5! exd5 9.cxd5 d6 10.e4 a6 11.a4 Nbd7 12.Nd2 Ne5 13.Be2 Re8 14.f4 Ng6 15.Bd3 White is better. Geller - Smyslov, USSR 1952]. 8.exd4 d5 [Against both 8...d6 and 8...0–0 White will play 9.d5]. 9.cxd5 Nxd5 10.Qe2 Nc6 11.Rd1 0–0 12.Nxd5 exd5 [Theory considers 12...Qxd5 as the equalizing maneuver, e.g. 13.Be4 Qh5 14.Bf4. Ludek Pachman is an openings expert and his theoretical knowledge covers a wide range of kingside and queenside openings. He seizes the initiative right away]. 13.Ne5 Qd6 [13...Nxd4?! looks really scary for Black because of 14.Bxh7+! Kxh7 15.Qh5+ Kg8 16.Rxd4 White has a good offensive at no material investment. On the other hand, whenever the game takes a tactical turn it is always good for Bali, for it is in such positions that he thrives]. 14.Bf4 Nxd4 15.Qe3 Qb4 16.a3 Qa4 17.b3! [An unpleasant surprise]. 17...Qxb3 [17...Nxb3? 18.Bc2 wins a piece] 18.Nd7! [18.Qxd4? is refuted by 18...Bc5 19.Bxh7+ Kxh7 20.Qd2 d4 Black is a pawn up with a superior position]. 18...Bc5 19.Be5 [It looks like Pachman here misses 19.Bxh7+! Kxh7 20.Rd3, winning]. 19...Rfe8 20.Rab1 Qc3 [Pachman had assumed that this move was impossible because of 21.Bxh7+, but now realizes that 21...Kxh7 22.Qxc3 loses it back to 22...Ne2+, so he panics]. 21.Kh1? Taking his king out of possible discovered knight checks on either e2 or f3, but with enough time he would have found 21.Rdc1! Qa5 (21...Qxa3 is met by 22.Rxc5!) 22.Nf6+! gxf6 23.Qh6 with a mating attack. 21...Nf5! [Bali is fighting tooth and nail] 22.Qf4 [22.Bxf5!? Bxe3 23.Bxc3 Bxf2 24.Be5 leaves Bali with three pawns for the knight]. 22...Rxe5! 23.Nxe5 Nd6 [Now White's threats against the queen have stopped and it is Black who is trying to win]. 24.Nf3 h6 25.a4 Re8 26.Rbc1 Qa3 27.Kg1 Qb3 28.Bc2 [Bali's tactical tricks are taking a huge toll on Pachman's time. For example, 28.Ne5? Bxf2+! 29.Kxf2 Qb2+ 30.Rc2 Qxe5 31.Qxe5 Rxe5 is at least equal for Black]. 28...Qb2 [Now the threat is 29...Re2] 29.Nd4? [And here is the mistake. The best defence is 29.Ne1! followed by Nd3]. 29...Bxd4 30.Qxd4? [The only move was 30.Qxd6 although Bali would still be ahead: 30...Bxf2+! 31.Kxf2 Rc8]. 30... Re1+! 0–1

Balinas' Caro-Kann-Steinitz opening novelty and vintage knight sacrifice win against another former Czech champion and World Championship Candidate GM Miroslav Filip, 1974 Nice, World Chess Olympiad.

Balinas-Filip, Nice, 1974. 1.e4 c6 2.d4 d5 3.Nc3 dxe4 4.Nxe4 Nd7 5.Nf3 Ngf6 6.Ng3 e6 7.Bd3 Be7 8.Qe2 O-O 9.Bg5N c5 10.O-O-O Re8 11.Kb1 cxd4 12.Bc4 Qb6 13.Rxd4 Nc5 14.Rhd1 Bd7 15.Ne5 Bc6 16.Bxf6 Bxf6 17.Nh5 Red8 18.Nxf6+ gxf6 19.Nxf7 Kxf7 20.Rd6 Rxd6 21.Rxd6 Re8 22.Qh5+ Kg7 23.Rd4 Rd8 24.Rg4+ Kh8 25.a3 Ne4 26.Bb3 Qc5 27.Qf7 Qf8 28.Qxe6 Nd2+ 29.Ka2 Re8 30.Qf5 Nxb3 31.cxb3 Qe7 32.Qa5 a6 33.g3 Qe5 34.Qd2 Bd5 35.h3 Qe6 36.Qd3 Be4 37.Qc3 Bf5 38.Rf4 Qe5 39.Qf3 Be6 40.Rxf6 1-0 http://www.chessgames.com/perl/chessgame?gid=1271089

Balinas' fighting win against the celebrated Candidate's Qualifier and former Czech champion GM Lubosh Kavalek, 1975 Marlboro Chess Classic:

Balinas, R ELO 2365-Kavalek, L ELO 2555, Manila, Result: 1-0 1.c4 Nf6 2.Nc3 g6 3.g3 Bg7 4.Bg2 0-0 5.Nf3 d5 6.cxd5 Nxd5 7.Qb3 Nb6 8.h4 h6 9.d4 Be6 10.Qc2 Nc6 11.Bf4 Nxd4 12.Nxd4 Qxd4 13.Rd1 Qb4 14.Bd2 c6 15.h5 g5 16.f4 gxf4 17.gxf4 Qc5 18.b4 Qc4 19.f5 Qg4 20.Bh3 Qg3+ 21.Kf1 Nc4 22.Ne4 Ne3+ 23.Bxe3 Qxe3 24.fxe6 fxe6+ 25. Ke1 Rf4 26.Bg2 a5 27.bxa5 Qa3 28.Rd3 Qxa5+ 29.Qd2 Qe5 30.Rd8+ Rxd8 31.Qxd8+ Rf8 32.Qd1 Qb2 33. Rh3 Qb6 34.Rf3 Rd8 35.Qc2 Rd5 36.Kf1 Rxh5 37.Qb3 Qd4 38.Qxe6+ Kh7 39.Rd3 Qa1+ 40.Kf2 Re5 1-0

Below the details of Balinas' win against another Soviet Champion and World Chess Championship candidate Lev Polugayevski:

Balinas, Rosendo ELO 2365 - Polugayevski, Lev ELO 2645, 1976 Marlboro Classic, Manila

1.c4 e5 2.Nc3 d6 3.g3 g6 4.Bg2 Bg7 5.d3 f5 6.f4 Nf6 7.Nf3 Nbd7 8.Bd2 0-0 9.Qc2 c6 10.0-0-0 Qe7 11.e3 Nc5! 12.fxe5 dxe5 13.d4 e4! 14.Ne1 Ne6 15.Kb1 Bd7 16.Bf1 Rac8 17.h3 c5 18.d5 Ng5 19.Be2 Nf7 20.Ng2 Ne5 21.Bc1 Ne8 22.Nf4 Nd6 23.b3 b5 24.Nxb5 Nxb5 25.cxb5 c4 26.d6! Qf7 27.Nd5 Nd3 28.bxc4 Bxb5 29.Ne7+ Kh8 30.Nxc8 Rxc8 31.Bxd3 exd3 32.Rxd3 Rxc4? 33.d7! Bxd7 34.Qb3 h5 35.Bb2! Ba4 36.Bxg7+ Kh7 37.Qb8! Bc2+ 38.Ka1 Qxg7+ 39.Rd4 Rxd4 40.exd4 Qxd4+ 41.Qb2 Qxb2+ 42.Kxb2 Be4 43.Rd1 g5 44.Rd7+ Kg6 45.Rd6+ Kg7 46.Kc3! Bg2 47.Kd4 Bxh3 48.Ke5 f4 49.gxf4 g4 50.f5! h4 51.f6+ Kf8 52.Rd8+ Kf7 53.Rh8 1-0 http://www.chessgames.com/perl/chessgame?gid=1112154

Widely regarded as Balinas' most famous game was an intense win against famous Danish grandmaster and World Championship Candidate, Bent Larsen, who played his beloved Larsen's Opening (1.b3):

Larsen-Balinas, Manila 1975. 1.b3 e5 2.Bb2 Nc6 3.e3 d5 4.Bb5 f6 5.d4 e4 6.Ne2 a6 7.Bxc6+ bxc6 8.c4 f5 9.Nbc3 Nf6 10.Nf4 Be7 11.cxd5 cxd5 12.Rc1 O-O 13.Na4 g5 14.Nh5 Ng4 15.h3 Nh6 16.Rc6 Bd6 17.h4 f4 18.hxg5 fxe3 19.Nf6+ Rxf6 20.gxf6 exf2+ 21.Kf1 Qxf6 22.Qh5 Bd7 23.Qxd5+ Kg7 24.Rxc7 Rd8 25.Rb7 Nf5 26.Rh3 e3 27.Qe4 Kf8 28.d5 Qg6 29.Qf3 Ke8 30.g4 Ng3+ 31.Rxg3 Qb1+ 32.Kg2 Qg1+ 33.Kh3 f1=Q+ 34.Qxf1 Qxf1+ 35.Rg2 Qh1+ 0-1 http://www.chessgames.com/perl/chessgame?gid=1318458

== Death ==
Balinas died on September 24, 1998 due to liver cancer.

== Links to selected games ==
- http://www.chessgames.com/perl/chess.pl?pid=19305&result=1st
