= Governor of Tawi-Tawi =

Local chief executive

Provincial Governor of Tawi-Tawi
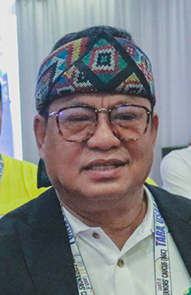
- Incumbent; Yshmael Sali since June 30, 2019
- Appointer: Elected via popular vote
- Term length: 3 years
- Inaugural holder: Romulo Espaldon
- Formation: 1973

The governor of Tawi-Tawi (Filipino: Punong Panlalawigan ng Tawi-Tawi), is the chief executive of the provincial government of Tawi-Tawi.

== Provincial Governors ==
No.	Image	Governor	Term
1		Romulo Espaldon	1973-1976
2		Nur Jaafar	1976-1986
3		Almarim Tillah	1986-1987
4		Lorenzo Reyes (Note: OIC Governor)	1987-1988
5		Hadjiril Matba	1988-1998
6		Sadikul Sahali	1998-2001
7		Rashidin Matba	2001-2004
(6)		Sadikul Sahali	2004-2013
8		Nurbert Sahali	2013-2016
(7)		Rashidin Matba	2016-2019
9		Yshmael Sali	2019-present
