= 1993 Philippine House of Representatives special elections =

- August 30, 1993

2 of 200 seats in the House of Representatives of the Philippines
	Majority party	Minority party
Party	Liberal	Lakas
Seats won	1	1
Popular vote	67,688	67,155
Percentage	50.20	49.80

Two special elections (known as "by-elections" elsewhere) to the House of Representatives of the Philippines, the lower house of Congress, were held on August 30, 1993. These were vacancies in the 9th Congress; the winners were to serve the rest of the term, which had ended on June 30, 1995.

These were the first special elections since the preceding ones in 1967, the downfall of Ferdinand Marcos in 1986, and the approval of the 1987 constitution. The disputed seats were for Agusan del Norte's 2nd congressional district, and for Capiz's 1st congressional district. Both winners, Edelmiro Amante and Mar Roxas, ran unopposed.

This was also the last special elections where more than one seat was disputed on election day.

== Electoral system ==
Most seats in the House of Representatives were elected from single member districts, under the first-past-the-post voting system. Under the Omnibus Election Code, when a seat becomes vacant prior to eighteen months before the general election, the Commission on Elections shall call a special election.

Other seats were sectoral representatives appointed by the president.

In the Philippines, an uncontested election (whether special or regular) always proceeds, with the sole candidate needing one vote in order to win.

== Special elections ==
Party	Votes	%	Seats
Liberal Party	67,688	50.20	1
Lakas–NUCD	67,155	49.80	1
Total	134,843	100.00	2
Valid votes	134,843	98.17	
Invalid/blank votes	2,511	1.83	
Total votes	137,354	100.00	
Registered voters/turnout	295,562	46.47	

=== Agusan del Norte's 2nd district ===
President Fidel V. Ramos announced the resignation of Executive Secretary Peter Garrucho in August 1992. Ramos then nominated Edelmiro Amante to replace him. Amante was one of the officials renominated Ramos after they were bypassed by the Commission on Appointments. Amante did not want to resign as congressman without the assurance that the commission will confirm him. Amante, a Lakas–NUCD stalwart, who attends cabinet meetings as an observer, is facing a commission tasked with confirming presidential appointments dominated by the opposition Laban ng Demokratikong Pilipino. By December, Amante asked to resign but the president granted him a medical leave of absence instead. Amante's nomination as Executive Secretary was again bypassed in April; Speaker Jose de Venecia Jr. then petitioned to make him Secretary of Public Works and Highways instead.

In May, Congress filed a resolution asking the Commission on Elections (COMELEC) to hold a special election in Amante's district. Amante, for his part, denied he will take part in the special election, as Ramos wanted him to stay as Executive Secretary. Amante had by then earlier said he would want to be public works secretary. A month later, the COMELEC set the special elections in August 30, with Amante reportedly taking part. Amante resigned as Executive Secretary, taking effect on July 1, 1993, to take part in the special election. Amante, upon his return from medical leave, saw his responsibilities exercised by other people when he left, then was not restored to him when he returned, making him disenchanted. In the special election, Amante said "I hope nobody will oppose me but should there be one, I will dispose of him". Ramos was then considering Senator Teofisto Guingona Jr. as Amante's replacement.

1993 Agusan del Norte's 2nd congressional district special election
Candidate	Party	Votes	%
Edelmiro Amante	Lakas–NUCD	67,155	100.00
Total		67,155	100.00
Valid votes		67,155	97.73
Invalid/blank votes		1,561	2.27
Total votes		68,716	100.00
Registered voters/turnout		121,038	56.77
Lakas–NUCD hold			
Source: Congressional Record (vote totals)

In the ensuing special election, Amante was elected unopposed.

Amante died in 2013, having 4 spells as Agusan del Norte congressman, last serving in 2010.

=== Capiz's 1st district ===
On April 4, 1993, Gerardo Roxas Jr. died. A month later, Speaker Pro-Tempore Raul Daza, acting in behalf of Speaker Jose de Venecia Jr., asked the COMELEC to hold a special election in Roxas's district. Either Roxas's mother Judy, or his brother Manuel "Mar", was slated to run. The COMELEC then set the special elections on August 30.

1993 Capiz's 1st congressional district special election
Candidate	Party	Votes	%
Mar Roxas	Liberal Party	67,688	100.00
Total		67,688	100.00
Valid votes		67,688	98.62
Invalid/blank votes		950	1.38
Total votes		68,638	100.00
Registered voters/turnout		174,524	39.33
Liberal Party hold			
Source: Congressional Record (vote totals)

Mar Roxas successfully defended his brother's seat unopposed.

Mar eventually became a member of the Cabinet and senator, and was defeated in the 2010 vice presidential and 2016 presidential election.

== Aftermath ==
After these uncontested elections, Congress elected the Lone Candidate Law, or Republic Act No. 8295, in 1997, wherein if there was only one candidate in a special election, the election would no longer take place, and the candidate shall be declared the winner.

== 1992 election results ==
=== Agusan del Norte's 2nd district ===
Candidate	Party	Votes	%
Edelmiro Amante (incumbent)	Lakas–NUCD	42,074	59.74
Roberto Aquino	LDP/Independent	22,576	32.06
Soledad Cagampang-de Castro	Independent	5,773	8.20
Total		70,423	100.00
Source: Commission on Elections

=== Capiz's 1st district ===
Candidate	Party	Votes	%
Gerardo Roxas Jr. (incumbent)	Koalisyong Pambansa/Lakas–CMD/Nacionalista	79,834	76.44
Gerardo Arcenas	Nationalist People's Coalition	19,013	18.20
Noede Villareal	Laban ng Demokratikong Pilipino	5,597	5.36
Total		104,444	100.00
Source: Commission on Elections
