= Rizal's 1st congressional district =

Legislative district of the Philippines

- Constituency for the House of Representatives of the Philippines
- Scope of the district within the province

- Location of Rizal within the Philippines
- Province: Rizal
- Region: Calabarzon
- Population: 1,239,688 (2024)
- Electorate: 521,954 (2022)
- Major settlements: 4 LGUs: Municipalities; Angono; Binangonan; Cainta; Taytay
- Area: 174.35 km^{2} (67.32 sq mi)

Current constituency
- Created: 1907
- Representative: Rebecca Maria A. Ynares
- Political party: NPC
- Congressional bloc: Majority

Rizal's 1st congressional district is one of the four congressional districts of the Philippines in the province of Rizal. It has been represented in the House of Representatives of the Philippines since 1916 and earlier in the Philippine Assembly from 1907 to 1916. The district consists of the southwestern Rizal municipalities of Angono, Binangonan, Cainta and Taytay. It is presently the most populous legislative district in the country, after the redistricting of Caloocan's 1st district in 2022. It is currently represented in the 20th Congress by Mia Ynares of the Nationalist People's Coalition (NPC).

Prior to its second dissolution in 1972, the district encompassed the former western Rizal municipalities and cities of Caloocan, Las Piñas, Makati, Malabon, Mandaluyong, Muntinlupa, Navotas, Parañaque, Pasay, Pateros, San Juan, and Taguig, as well as the western part of Quezon City, which had previously belonged to Caloocan and San Juan; such area now forms the majority of the present-day Metro Manila. After the creation of Metro Manila in 1975, it encompassed Antipolo and the southwestern part of the reduced province of Rizal beginning in 1987. In 1998, Antipolo was separated from the district to form its own representation as a newly converted city, leaving the four remaining municipalities in its current jurisdiction.

== Representation history ==
#	Image	Member	Term of office		Legislature	Party	Electoral history	Constituent LGUs
#	Image	Member	Start	End	Legislature	Party	Electoral history	Constituent LGUs
=== Rizal's 1st district for the Philippine Assembly ===
District created January 9, 1907.
1		Cayetano Lukbán	October 16, 1907	October 16, 1909	1st	Nacionalista	Elected in 1907.	1907–1909; Caloocan, Las Piñas, Malabon, Navotas, Parañaque, Pasay, San Felipe Neri, San Juan del Monte, San Pedro Macati, Taguig
2		José Lino Luna	October 16, 1909	October 16, 1912	2nd	Nacionalista	Elected in 1909.	1909–1916; Caloocan, Las Piñas, Malabon, Navotas, Parañaque, Pasay, Pateros, San Felipe Neri, San Juan del Monte, San Pedro Macati, Taguig
3		Arsenio Cruz Herrera	October 16, 1912	October 16, 1916	3rd	Progresista	Elected in 1912.	1909–1916; Caloocan, Las Piñas, Malabon, Navotas, Parañaque, Pasay, Pateros, San Felipe Neri, San Juan del Monte, San Pedro Macati, Taguig
3		Arsenio Cruz Herrera	October 16, 1912	October 16, 1916	3rd	Demócrata	Elected in 1912.	1909–1916; Caloocan, Las Piñas, Malabon, Navotas, Parañaque, Pasay, Pateros, San Felipe Neri, San Juan del Monte, San Pedro Macati, Taguig
=== Rizal's 1st district for the House of Representatives of the Philippine Islands ===
4		Arcadio Santos	October 16, 1916	June 3, 1919	4th	Nacionalista	Elected in 1916.	1916–1919; Caloocan, Las Piñas, Makati, Malabon, Navotas, Parañaque, Pasay, Pateros, San Felipe Neri, San Juan del Monte, Taguig
5		Agapito Ignacio	June 3, 1919	June 6, 1922	5th	Nacionalista	Elected in 1919.	1919–1934; Caloocan, Las Piñas, Makati, Malabon, Muntinlupa, Navotas, Parañaque, Pasay, Pateros, San Felipe Neri, San Juan del Monte, Taguig
6		Andrés Pascual	June 6, 1922	June 2, 1925	6th	Demócrata	Elected in 1922.	1919–1934; Caloocan, Las Piñas, Makati, Malabon, Muntinlupa, Navotas, Parañaque, Pasay, Pateros, San Felipe Neri, San Juan del Monte, Taguig
7		Basilio Bautista	June 2, 1925	June 5, 1928	7th	Demócrata	Elected in 1925.	1919–1934; Caloocan, Las Piñas, Makati, Malabon, Muntinlupa, Navotas, Parañaque, Pasay, Pateros, San Felipe Neri, San Juan del Monte, Taguig
8		Manuel Bernabé	June 5, 1928	June 2, 1931	8th	Demócrata	Elected in 1928.	1919–1934; Caloocan, Las Piñas, Makati, Malabon, Muntinlupa, Navotas, Parañaque, Pasay, Pateros, San Felipe Neri, San Juan del Monte, Taguig
9		Pedro Magsalin	June 2, 1931	September 16, 1935	9th	Nacionalista; Consolidado	Elected in 1931.	1919–1934; Caloocan, Las Piñas, Makati, Malabon, Muntinlupa, Navotas, Parañaque, Pasay, Pateros, San Felipe Neri, San Juan del Monte, Taguig
9		Pedro Magsalin	June 2, 1931	September 16, 1935	10th	Nacionalista; Democrático	Re-elected in 1934.	1934–1935; Caloocan, Las Piñas, Makati, Malabon, Mandaluyong, Muntinlupa, Navotas, Parañaque, Pasay, Pateros, San Juan, Taguig
#	Image	Member	Term of office		National Assembly	Party	Electoral history	Constituent LGUs
#	Image	Member	Start	End	National Assembly	Party	Electoral history	Constituent LGUs
=== Rizal's 1st district for the National Assembly (Commonwealth of the Philippines) ===
(9)		Pedro Magsalin	September 16, 1935	December 30, 1938	1st	Nacionalista; Democrático	Re-elected in 1935.	1935–1941; Caloocan, Las Piñas, Makati, Malabon, Mandaluyong, Muntinlupa, Navotas, Parañaque, Pasay, Pateros, San Juan, Taguig
10		Francisco Sevilla	December 30, 1938	December 30, 1941	2nd	Nacionalista	Elected in 1938.	1935–1941; Caloocan, Las Piñas, Makati, Malabon, Mandaluyong, Muntinlupa, Navotas, Parañaque, Pasay, Pateros, San Juan, Taguig
District dissolved into the two-seat Rizal's at-large district for the National Assembly (Second Philippine Republic).
#	Image	Member	Term of office		Common wealth Congress	Party	Electoral history	Constituent LGUs
#	Image	Member	Start	End	Common wealth Congress	Party	Electoral history	Constituent LGUs
=== Rizal's 1st district for the House of Representatives of the Commonwealth of the Philippines ===
District re-created May 24, 1945.
(10)		Francisco Sevilla	June 11, 1945	May 25, 1946	1st	Nacionalista	Re-elected in 1941.	1945–1946; Caloocan, Las Piñas, Makati, Malabon, Mandaluyong, Muntinlupa, Navotas, Parañaque, Pasay, Pateros, San Juan, Taguig, west Quezon City
#	Image	Member	Term of office		Congress	Party	Electoral history	Constituent LGUs
#	Image	Member	Start	End	Congress	Party	Electoral history	Constituent LGUs
=== Rizal's 1st district for the House of Representatives of the Philippines ===
11		Ignacio Santos-Díaz	May 25, 1946	December 30, 1949	1st	Liberal	Elected in 1946.	1946–1949; Caloocan, Las Piñas, Makati, Malabon, Mandaluyong, Muntinlupa, Navotas, Parañaque, Pasay, Pateros, San Juan, Taguig, west Quezon City
12		Eulogio Rodriguez Jr.	December 30, 1949	December 30, 1957	2nd	Nacionalista	Elected in 1949.	1949–1953; Caloocan, Las Piñas, Makati, Malabon, Mandaluyong, Muntinlupa, Navotas, Parañaque, Pateros, Rizal City, San Juan, Taguig, west Quezon City
12		Eulogio Rodriguez Jr.	December 30, 1949	December 30, 1957	3rd	Nacionalista	Re-elected in 1953.	1953–1972; Caloocan, Las Piñas, Makati, Malabon, Mandaluyong, Muntinlupa, Navotas, Parañaque, Pasay, Pateros, San Juan, Taguig, west Quezon City
13		Benedicto Padilla	December 30, 1957	December 30, 1961	4th	Liberal	Elected in 1957.	1953–1972; Caloocan, Las Piñas, Makati, Malabon, Mandaluyong, Muntinlupa, Navotas, Parañaque, Pasay, Pateros, San Juan, Taguig, west Quezon City
14		Rufino D. Antonio	December 30, 1961	December 30, 1965	5th	Liberal	Elected in 1961.	1953–1972; Caloocan, Las Piñas, Makati, Malabon, Mandaluyong, Muntinlupa, Navotas, Parañaque, Pasay, Pateros, San Juan, Taguig, west Quezon City
15		Edgar U. Ilarde	December 30, 1965	December 30, 1969	6th	Independent	Elected in 1965.	1953–1972; Caloocan, Las Piñas, Makati, Malabon, Mandaluyong, Muntinlupa, Navotas, Parañaque, Pasay, Pateros, San Juan, Taguig, west Quezon City
15		Edgar U. Ilarde	December 30, 1965	December 30, 1969	6th	Liberal	Elected in 1965.	1953–1972; Caloocan, Las Piñas, Makati, Malabon, Mandaluyong, Muntinlupa, Navotas, Parañaque, Pasay, Pateros, San Juan, Taguig, west Quezon City
16		Neptali Gonzales	December 30, 1969	September 23, 1972	7th	Liberal	Elected in 1969. Removed from office after imposition of martial law.	1953–1972; Caloocan, Las Piñas, Makati, Malabon, Mandaluyong, Muntinlupa, Navotas, Parañaque, Pasay, Pateros, San Juan, Taguig, west Quezon City
District dissolved into the nineteen-seat Region IV's at-large district for the Interim Batasang Pambansa, followed by the two-seat Rizal's at-large district for the Regular Batasang Pambansa.
District re-created February 2, 1987.
17		Francisco Sumulong	June 30, 1987	June 30, 1992	8th	LABAN	Elected in 1987.	1987–1998; Angono, Antipolo, Binangonan, Cainta, Taytay
17		Francisco Sumulong	June 30, 1987	June 30, 1992	8th	Lakas	Elected in 1987.	1987–1998; Angono, Antipolo, Binangonan, Cainta, Taytay
18		Manuel R. Sanchez	June 30, 1992	December 7, 1993	9th	Koalisyong Pambansa	Elected in 1992. Election annulled by Supreme Court due to U.S. citizenship.	1987–1998; Angono, Antipolo, Binangonan, Cainta, Taytay
19		Gilberto Duavit Sr.	March 15, 1994	June 30, 2001	9th	NPC	Elected in 1994 to finish Sanchez's term.	1987–1998; Angono, Antipolo, Binangonan, Cainta, Taytay
19		Gilberto Duavit Sr.	March 15, 1994	June 30, 2001	10th	NPC	Re-elected in 1995.	1987–1998; Angono, Antipolo, Binangonan, Cainta, Taytay
19		Gilberto Duavit Sr.	March 15, 1994	June 30, 2001	11th	NPC	Re-elected in 1998.	1998–present Angono, Binangonan, Cainta, Taytay
20		Jack Duavit	June 30, 2001	June 30, 2010	12th	NPC	Elected in 2001.	1998–present Angono, Binangonan, Cainta, Taytay
20		Jack Duavit	June 30, 2001	June 30, 2010	13th	NPC	Re-elected in 2004.	1998–present Angono, Binangonan, Cainta, Taytay
20		Jack Duavit	June 30, 2001	June 30, 2010	14th	NPC	Re-elected in 2007.	1998–present Angono, Binangonan, Cainta, Taytay
21		Joel Roy R. Duavit	June 30, 2010	June 30, 2016	15th	NPC	Elected in 2010.	1998–present Angono, Binangonan, Cainta, Taytay
21		Joel Roy R. Duavit	June 30, 2010	June 30, 2016	16th	NPC	Re-elected in 2013.	1998–present Angono, Binangonan, Cainta, Taytay
(20)		Jack Duavit	June 30, 2016	June 30, 2025	17th	NPC	Elected in 2016.	1998–present Angono, Binangonan, Cainta, Taytay
(20)		Jack Duavit	June 30, 2016	June 30, 2025	18th	NPC	Re-elected in 2019.	1998–present Angono, Binangonan, Cainta, Taytay
(20)		Jack Duavit	June 30, 2016	June 30, 2025	19th	NPC	Re-elected in 2022.	1998–present Angono, Binangonan, Cainta, Taytay
22		Mia Ynares	June 30, 2025	Incumbent	20th	NPC	Elected in 2025.	1998–present Angono, Binangonan, Cainta, Taytay

== Election results ==
=== 2025 ===
2025 Philippine House of Representatives elections
Party	Candidate	Votes	%
NPC	Mia Ynares	255,258	72.03
Independent	JB Pallasigue	74,704	21.08
PDSP	Jay Narciso	14,343	4.05
Reporma	Anton Galias	10,050	2.84
Valid ballots		354,355	83.75
Invalid or blank votes		68,745	16.25
Total votes		423,100	100.00
NPC hold			

=== 2022 ===
2022 Philippine House of Representatives elections
Party	Candidate	Votes	%
NPC	Jack Duavit	308,707	100.00
Valid ballots		308,707	70.3
Invalid or blank votes		130,431	29.7
Total votes		439,138	100.00
NPC hold			

=== 2019 ===
2019 Philippine House of Representatives elections
Party	Candidate	Votes	%
NPC	Jack Duavit	284,871	90.50
PDDS	Catalino Dazo	29,902	9.50
Total votes		314,773	100.00
NPC hold			

=== 2016 ===
2016 Philippine House of Representatives elections
Party	Candidate	Votes	%
NPC	Michael John Duavit	246,141	
Independent	Avelino Zapanta	24,543	
Independent	Willfrido Naval	13,741	
Independent	Jerry Barbacena	4,635	
Independent	Titus Perez	8,825	
Invalid or blank votes		59,599	
Total votes		357,484	
NPC hold			

=== 2013 ===
2013 Philippine House of Representatives elections
Party	Candidate	Votes	%
NPC	Joel Roy Duavit	192,841	75.08
Invalid or blank votes		63,991	24.92
Total votes		256,832	100.00
NPC hold			

=== 2010 ===
2010 Philippine House of Representatives elections
Party	Candidate	Votes	%
NPC	Joel Roy Duavit	207,300	75.81
Aksyon	Joaquin Mendoza	39,678	14.51
Independent	Wilfrido Naval	20,122	7.36
Independent	Paulino Cruz	6,362	2.33
Valid ballots		273,462	87.10
Invalid or blank votes		40,500	12.90
Total votes		313,962	100.00
NPC hold			

=== 1994 special ===
1994 Rizal's 1st congressional district special election
Candidate	Party	Votes	%
Gilberto Duavit Sr.	NPC	59,987	46.46
Francisco Sumulong	Lakas–NUCD	38,953	30.17
Rogelio Sanchez Silvestre	Liberal Party	29,035	22.49
Eduardo Inlayo	Independent	729	0.56
Rosendo Balinas Jr.	Independent	270	0.21
Elmer Panotes	Independent	144	0.11
Total		129,118	100.00
Registered voters/turnout		353,942	36.93
Majority		21,034	16.29
NPC gain from Lakas–NUCD			

== See also ==
- Legislative districts of Rizal
