= Tawi-Tawi's at-large congressional district =

District of the Philippines

- Constituency for the House of Representatives of the Philippines
- Location of Tawi-Tawi within the Philippines
- Province: Tawi-Tawi
- Region: Bangsamoro
- Population: 440,276 (2020)
- Electorate: 255,632 (2025)
- Area: 1,087.40 km^{2} (419.85 sq mi)

Current constituency
- Created: 1984
- Representative: Dimszar M. Sali
- Political party: NUP
- Congressional bloc: Majority

Tawi-Tawi's at-large congressional district refers to the lone congressional district of the Philippines in the province of Tawi-Tawi. The province has been represented in the country's national legislatures since 1984. It first elected a representative provincewide at-large during the 1984 Philippine parliamentary election following the restoration of provincial and city district representation in the Batasang Pambansa where Tawi-Tawi had previously been included in the regionwide representation of Western Mindanao (Region IX) for the interim parliament. The province, created by the 1973 separation of the Tawi-Tawi island group from Sulu, was formerly represented as part of that province's at-large district in earlier legislatures. Since the 1987 restoration of Congress following the ratification of a new constitution, Tawi-Tawi has been entitled to one member in the House of Representatives. It is currently represented in the 20th Congress by Dimszar M. Sali of the National Unity Party (NUP).

== Representation history ==
#	Image	Member	Tenure of office		Batasang Pambansa	Party	Electoral history
#	Image	Member	Start	End	Batasang Pambansa	Party	Electoral history
=== Tawi-Tawi's at-large district for the Regular Batasang Pambansa ===
District created February 1, 1984 from Region IX's at-large district.
1		Celso J. Palma	July 23, 1984	March 25, 1986	2nd	KBL	Elected in 1984.
#	Image	Member	Tenure of office		Congress	Party	Electoral history
#	Image	Member	Start	End	Congress	Party	Electoral history
=== Tawi-Tawi's at-large district for the House of Representatives of the Philippines ===
District re-created February 2, 1987.
2		Alawadin T. Bandon Jr.	June 30, 1987	December 12, 1990	8th	PDP–Laban	Elected in 1987. Removed from office due to electoral protest.
3		Romulo Espaldon	December 12, 1990	June 30, 1992	8th	Lakas ng Bansa	Declared winner of 1987 elections.
4		Nur Jaafar	June 30, 1992	June 30, 2001	9th	Lakas	Elected in 1992.
4		Nur Jaafar	June 30, 1992	June 30, 2001	10th	LDP	Re-elected in 1995.
4		Nur Jaafar	June 30, 1992	June 30, 2001	11th	LAMMP	Re-elected in 1998.
5		Soraya C. Jaafar	June 30, 2001	June 30, 2004	12th	Lakas	Elected in 2001.
6		Anuar J. Abubakar	June 30, 2004	August 3, 2006	13th	PMP	Elected in 2004. Election annulled by House electoral tribunal after an election protest.
(4)		Nur Jaafar	August 3, 2006	June 30, 2013	13th	Lakas	Declared winner of 2004 elections.
(4)		Nur Jaafar	August 3, 2006	June 30, 2013	14th	Lakas	Re-elected in 2007.
(4)		Nur Jaafar	August 3, 2006	June 30, 2013	15th	NPC	Re-elected in 2010.
7		Ruby Sahali Tan	June 30, 2013	June 30, 2019	16th	Liberal	Elected in 2013.
7		Ruby Sahali Tan	June 30, 2013	June 30, 2019	17th	PDP–Laban	Re-elected in 2016.
8		Rashidin H. Matba	June 30, 2019	June 30, 2022	18th	NUP	Elected in 2019.
9		Dimszar M. Sali	June 30, 2022	Incumbent	19th	NUP	Elected in 2022.
9		Dimszar M. Sali	June 30, 2022	Incumbent	20th	NUP	Re-elected in 2025.

== Election results ==
=== 2025 ===
Candidate	Party	Votes	%
Dimszar Sali (incumbent)	National Unity Party	140,294	75.38
Anuar Abubakar	Aksyon Demokratiko	45,814	24.62
Total		186,108	100.00
Registered voters/turnout		255,632	–
National Unity Party hold			
Source: Commission on Elections

== See also ==
- Legislative districts of Tawi-Tawi
