= Sadikul Sahali =

Governor of Tawi-Tawi, Philippines (1941–2024)

Hadji Sakidul Adalla Sahali
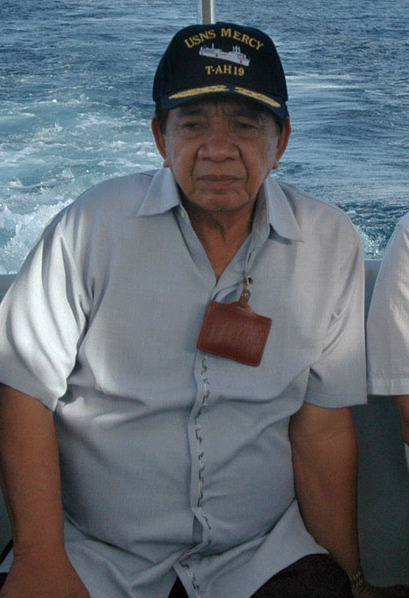

Governor of Tawi-Tawi
- In office June 30, 2004 – June 30, 2013
- Preceded by: Rashidin Matba
- Succeeded by: Nurbert Sahali
- In office June 30, 1998 – June 30, 2001
- Preceded by: Hadjiril Matba
- Succeeded by: Rashidin Matba

Mayor of Balimbing
- In office June 30, 1988 – June 30, 1995
- In office 1971–1987

Personal details
- Born: June 18, 1941 (age 85) Luuk, Sulu, Commonwealth of the Philippines
- Died: December 31, 2024 (aged 83) Luuk, Sulu
- Party: PDP–Laban (2018–2024)
- Other political affiliations: Lakas–CMD (1998–2004, 2005–2018); PMP (2004–2005)
- Spouse: Juana Maquiso Sahali
- Education: Mindanao Agricultural College

Hadji Sadikul "Dick" Adalla Sahali (June 18, 1941 - December 31, 2024) is a Filipino politician and former Governor of Tawi-Tawi, an island province in the Sulu Archipelago. Politically, Tawi-Tawi is part of the Autonomous Region in Muslim Mindanao.

== Background ==
Sahali was born in Luuk, Sulu to a family of farmers. In 1965, he graduated from the Mindanao Agricultural College (now Central Mindanao University) in Musuan, Bukidnon with a Bachelor of Science in Agricultural Engineering. He first turned toward farming.

Sahali is married to Juana Maquiso Sahali, a principal of Batu-Batu National High School in Panglima Sugala, Tawi-Tawi. His four surviving children all have positions in government: Hadja Ruby Sahali-Tan serves as the regional secretary of DSWD-ARMM; Regie Sahali-Generale is a former assemblywoman of the RLA-ARMM and former vice governor of the Autonomous Region in Muslim Mindanao (ARMM); Nurbert Sahali is mayor of Panglima Sugala, Tawi-Tawi; and Nurjay M. Sahali is secretary to the Governor.

== Political activities ==
Sahali first waded into the political arena in 1971, when he ran and won as Mayor of Panglima Sugala (formerly Balimbing). There he served his constituents for the next 16 years, until 1987. During the 1988 elections, he won the mayor's seat and served for two additional terms until 1995.

In May 1998, he aspired for a higher post and won as Governor of the Province of Tawi-Tawi, serving until 2001, when he lost his reelection bid to Rashidin Matba. In 2004, however, Sahali again prevailed, retaking the seat. In 2007, an overwhelming majority voted to give him a second consecutive term to complete the various socio-economic programs and projects for the province.
