= Gilberto Duavit Sr. =

Filipino lawyer, entrepreneur, and politician (1934–2018)

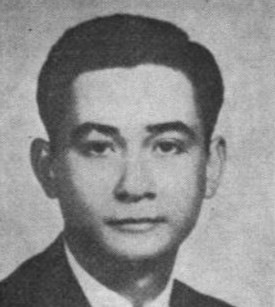
- Duavit in 1967

Member of the Philippine House of Representatives from Rizal's 1st congressional district
- In office March 15, 1994 – June 30, 2001
- Preceded by: Manuel R. Sanchez
- Succeeded by: Michael John R. Duavit

Member of the Interim Batasang Pambansa for Region IV-A
- In office June 12, 1978 – June 5, 1984

Chairman, Republic Broadcasting System (now GMA Network, Inc.)
- In office September 24, 1974 – September 22, 1976
- Preceded by: Loreto Feliciano Stewart
- Succeeded by: Felipe Gozon

Delegate of the 1971 Constitutional Convention from the Rizal's 2nd congressional district
- In office June 1, 1971 – January 17, 1973
- Preceded by: Position created
- Succeeded by: Position abolished

Personal details
- Born: Gilberto Muñoz Duavit; November 29, 1934 Manila, Philippine Islands
- Died: December 14, 2018 (aged 84)
- Party: NPC (1994–2018)
- Other party: KBL (1978–1984)
- Spouse: Vilma Roy-Duavit
- Children: Judith Duavit-Vasquez; Gilberto Duavit Jr. Michael John Duavit; Joel Roy Duavit
- Occupation: Lawyer, entrepreneur, politician

Gilberto "Bibit" Muñoz Duavit Sr. (November 29, 1934 – December 14, 2018) was a Filipino lawyer, entrepreneur and politician. He was a major figure in the GMA Network Inc. and a member of the House of Representatives from 1994 to 2001.

== Early life and education ==
Duavit was born on November 29, 1934, in Manila. He was the son of Margarito Duavit and Rosa Muñoz.

He earned his Bachelor of Arts and law degree from the University of the East Manila, and held a doctorate degree in humanities from the University of Rizal System.

== Business career ==
He was chairman of GMA Network, Inc. from 1974 to 1976 and was a former director of the company in 1977. He along with accountant Menardo Jimenez and lawyer Felipe Gozon acquired the Republic Broadcasting System (RBS) from Robert Stewart in 1974 and renamed as GMA Radio-Television Arts.

Duavit sat as chairman and chief executive officer of Group Management and Development, Inc., as well as chairman of Guronasyon Foundation, Inc., an organization which recognizes remarkable teachers in the province of Rizal. He was also chair or director of various firms and companies, among them Permastress Industries, Inc., Unistress Concrete Systems, Inc., Sagittarius Condominium Corporation, and Mar Fishing Company, Inc.

== Political career ==
Duavit was a former assistant executive secretary for social, political, legal, and economic affairs (1966–1970) and acting executive secretary, Office of the President (1969), and was twice awarded the Presidential Merit Award in 1967 and 1968.

He became a delegate to the 1971 Constitutional Convention, representing the 2nd district of Rizal, and president of the Philippine Constitutional Association (PHILCONSA) in 1970.

He served as executive director of the National Youth and Sports Development Foundation of the Philippines (1978), and as senior deputy minister of the Ministry of Youth and Sports Development (1974–1978). He was also a member of the Interim Batasang Pambansa, representing the Southern Tagalog Region from 1978 to 1984.

=== House of Representatives (1994–2001) ===
In 1994, a special election was held in the 1st district of Rizal where Duavit won as its representative under the Nationalist People's Coalition. He was later reelected as a member of the 10th and 11th Congresses.

During his stint in Congress, he served as senior assistant minority floor leader (10th Congress) and chairman of the House Committee of Appropriations (11th Congress) after becoming a member of the same House Committee (9th and 10th Congress).

He had likewise served as a member of various House Committees including Constitutional Amendments, Education and Culture, Housing and Urban Development, Public Works and Highways, and Banks and Financial Intermediaries.

As a lawmaker, Duavit was cited as one of the Ten Most Outstanding Congressmen in the 9th, 10th, and 11th Congresses.

== Personal life ==
He married Vilma D. Roy and bore four children, namely GMA network president and chief executive officer Gilberto Duavit Jr., Rizal Representative Michael John Duavit, Rizal former representative Joel Roy Duavit, and GMA board member Judith Duavit Vasquez.

== Death ==
Duavit died on December 14, 2018, due to a stroke. He was 84 years old. His cremated remains were placed at The Heritage Park in Taguig for public viewing. On December 18, 2018, his ashes were brought Binangonan, Rizal.
