= Second impeachment of Sara Duterte =

2026 Philippine political event

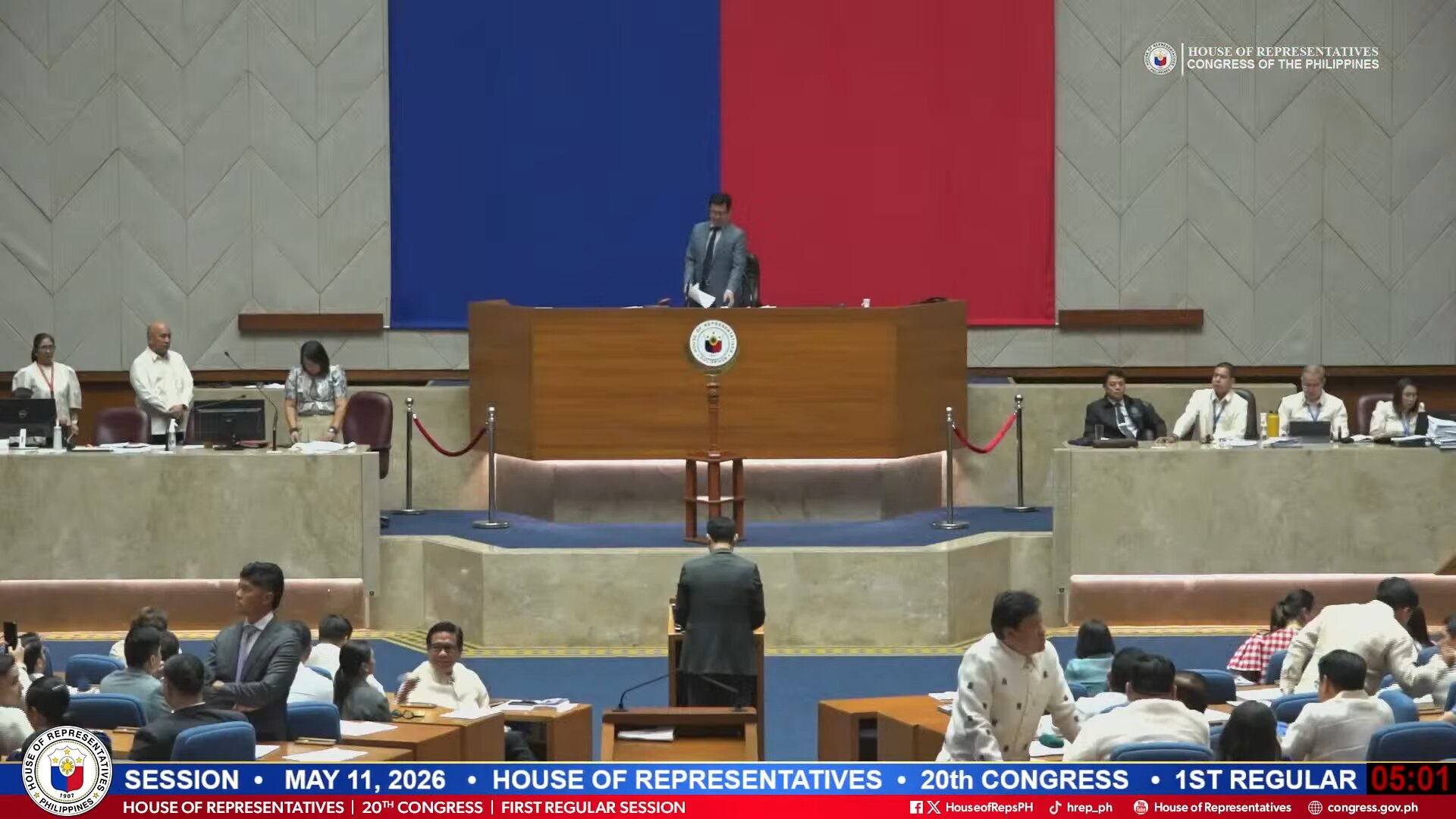
- Proceedings in the plenary hall of the House of Representatives after the chamber impeached Vice President Sara Duterte for the second time on May 11, 2026
- Accused: Sara Duterte, 15th vice president of the Philippines
- Date: May 11, 2026 – present
- Charges: Betrayal of public trust; Culpable violation of the Constitution; Graft and corruption; Bribery

Approval of the committee report from the Committee on Justice (May 4, 2026)
- Votes in favor: 55 / 55 (100%)
- Votes against: 0 / 55 (0%)
- Result: The Articles of Impeachment was transmitted to the House for a formal plenary vote.

Plenary vote by the House of Representatives on the adoption of House Resolution No. 989 containing the Articles of Impeachment (May 11, 2026)
- Votes in favor: 257 / 318 (81%)
- Votes against: 25 / 318 (8%)
- Present: 9 / 318 (3%)
- Not voting: 27 / 318 (8%)
- Result: The Articles of Impeachment was transmitted to the Senate for the impeachment trial of Duterte. The Senate convened as an impeachment court on May 18, 2026.

Impeachment trial in the Senate
- Result: The Senate began the impeachment trial on July 6, 2026.

On February 2, 2026, renewed efforts began to impeach Sara Duterte for a second time as Vice President of the Philippines, following her earlier impeachment by the House of Representatives on February 5, 2025. The earlier proceedings transmitted the articles of impeachment to the Senate for trial. However, when the Senate convened as an impeachment court on June 10, 2025, it remanded the articles back to the House.

In July 2025, the Supreme Court declared the impeachment complaint unconstitutional after ruling that earlier complaints had already triggered the one-year constitutional ban on multiple impeachment proceedings, effectively aborting the trial. Following the lapse of the one-year ban, at least two new impeachment complaints were filed against Duterte. The four impeachment complaints were formally initiated on February 23, 2026, after being referred to the House Committee on Justice.

On April 29, 2026, the House Committee on Justice, chaired by Gerville Luistro, voted unanimously (53–0) to find probable cause to impeach Duterte. The committee consolidated the complaints, including those filed by lawyer Nathaniel Cabrera and a group led by priests and lawyers, into a single set of articles of impeachment. Lawmakers cited allegations of misuse of confidential funds, unexplained wealth, and threats against President Bongbong Marcos, First Lady Liza Araneta Marcos, and former House Speaker Martin Romualdez.

The consolidated articles were put to a plenary vote on May 11, 2026, during which 257 members of the House voted to impeach Duterte, thereby transmitting the articles of impeachment to the Senate. The Senate convened as an impeachment court on May 18, although the impeachment trial proper did not officially begin until July 6, 2026.

== Background ==
=== 2025 impeachment ===
Vice President Sara Duterte was initially impeached by the House of Representatives on February 5, 2025, and was backed by 215 members of the lower house, paving way for a potential trial by the Senate acting as an impeachment court. The impeachment complaint followed three earlier complaints in December 2024.

According to the rules of the House of Representatives, there are three methods to impeach an official:

- A member of the House of Representatives files a verified complaint.
- A private citizen–upon a resolution of endorsement by any House member–files a verified complaint
- At least one-third of all House members will file verified complaint or resolution of impeachment

The 2025 impeachment of Duterte went through the third route.

Senate President Chiz Escudero maintained that the Senate cannot start the proceedings until after Congress reconvenes on June 2, 2025. The Senate did not start the trial despite proponents of the impeachment trial insisting that the Constitution obliges that a "trial by the Senate shall proceed forthwith," or as soon as possible. Pressure on the Senate persisted until at least June.

The trial formally commenced on June 10, 2025, with Escudero administering the oath to the rest of the 22 senators. The Senate, however, voted to remand the impeachment complaint back to the House of Representatives asking the chamber to certify the complaint as compliant with the one-year ban and communicating the yet to be-convened lower house of the 20th Congress if it is willing to move forward with the proceedings.

=== Duterte v. House of Representatives ===
The Supreme Court unanimously nullified the impeachment complaint against Vice President Sara Duterte on July 25, 2025, ruling that the Articles of Impeachment were "unconstitutional". In Duterte v. House of Representatives (G.R. No. 278353), the Court held that the constitutional "one-year bar rule" had already been triggered by the first three impeachment complaints filed against Duterte in late 2024, rendering the fourth complaint endorsed by more than one-third of the House of Representatives on February 5, 2025, invalid.

The Court further ruled that constitutional due process and fairness apply throughout all stages of impeachment proceedings, including proceedings before the House of Representatives. The justices stated that although impeachment is political in character, it remains subject to constitutional limitations and standards of procedural fairness, including the respondent's right to adequate notice and opportunity to answer allegations.

As a result of the ruling, no impeachment trial before the Senate was held, with the Court ruling that the Senate could not acquire jurisdiction over unconstitutional Articles of Impeachment.

The House of Representatives filed a motion for reconsideration on August 4, 2025, arguing that the lower chamber possesses the exclusive constitutional authority to initiate impeachment proceedings. The House further cited Francisco v. House of Representatives, maintaining that impeachment proceedings are initiated only upon referral to the committee or endorsement by one-third of House members.

On January 28, 2026, the Supreme Court en banc denied the motion for reconsideration with finality and affirmed its earlier ruling. The Court additionally clarified that "session days" referred to calendar days during which the House actually holds session, rejecting interpretations limiting the term solely to legislative session days.

The ruling significantly affected subsequent impeachment efforts against Duterte. Following the expiration of the one-year constitutional prohibition on February 6, 2026, new impeachment complaints were refiled before the House under procedures adjusted to comply with the Supreme Court's interpretation of the Constitution, particularly its emphasis on due process protections and procedural fairness in impeachment proceedings.

=== 2026 efforts ===
The impeachment proceedings are expected to take longer than last year. The complaints will be evaluated by the House of Representatives Committee on Justice whether such complaints are sufficient in substance.

It is unclear, however, when the one-year ban was counted from. The July 2025 ruling states that new impeachment complaints against Duterte can only be filed on February 6, 2026. However, the January 2026 resolution states "the 10 session days should be reckoned from the filing and endorsement of the first impeachment complaint on December 2, 2024," which meant that the first complaint was deemed initiated on January 14, 2025, which meant the prohibition lapsed on January 15, 2026.

Duterte formally announced her presidential campaign for the 2028 election on February 18, 2026.

== Complaints ==
| # | Case | Violation |
|---|---|---|
| 1 | Systemic misuse, misappropriation and irregular liquidation of confidential funds amounting to ₱500,000,000.00 released to the Office of the Vice President (OVP) and ₱112,500,000.00 released to the Department of Education (DEPED). | Culpable violation of the constitution, graft and corruption, and betrayal of public trust |
| 2a | Amassed unexplained wealth manifestly disproportionate to her lawful income and earnings during her incumbency as public official. | Betrayal of public trust and/or culpable violation of the constitution |
| 2b | Failed to fully and truthfully disclose all her and her spouse's asset's liabilities and net worth in her Statement of Asset's Liabilities and Net Worth (SALN) including her SALN for the years 2022, 2023, and 2024. | Betrayal of public trust and/or culpable violation of the constitution |
| 2c | Failed to divest and instead, willfully continued, all her business interests during her tenure as Vice President for the years 2022, 2023, 2024 and 2025. | Betrayal of public trust and/or culpable violation of the constitution |
| 3 | Gave monetary gifts and payments to Department of Education officials to induce the violation and circumvention of procurement and other related laws. | Bribery, graft and corruption, culpable violation of the constitution and betrayal of public trust |
| 4 | Contracting the assassination of the President, the First Lady and the Former Speaker of the House, by making grave threats, and by actively inciting sedition against the Republic. | Culpable violation of the constitution, high crimes and betrayal of public trust |

=== Filing ===
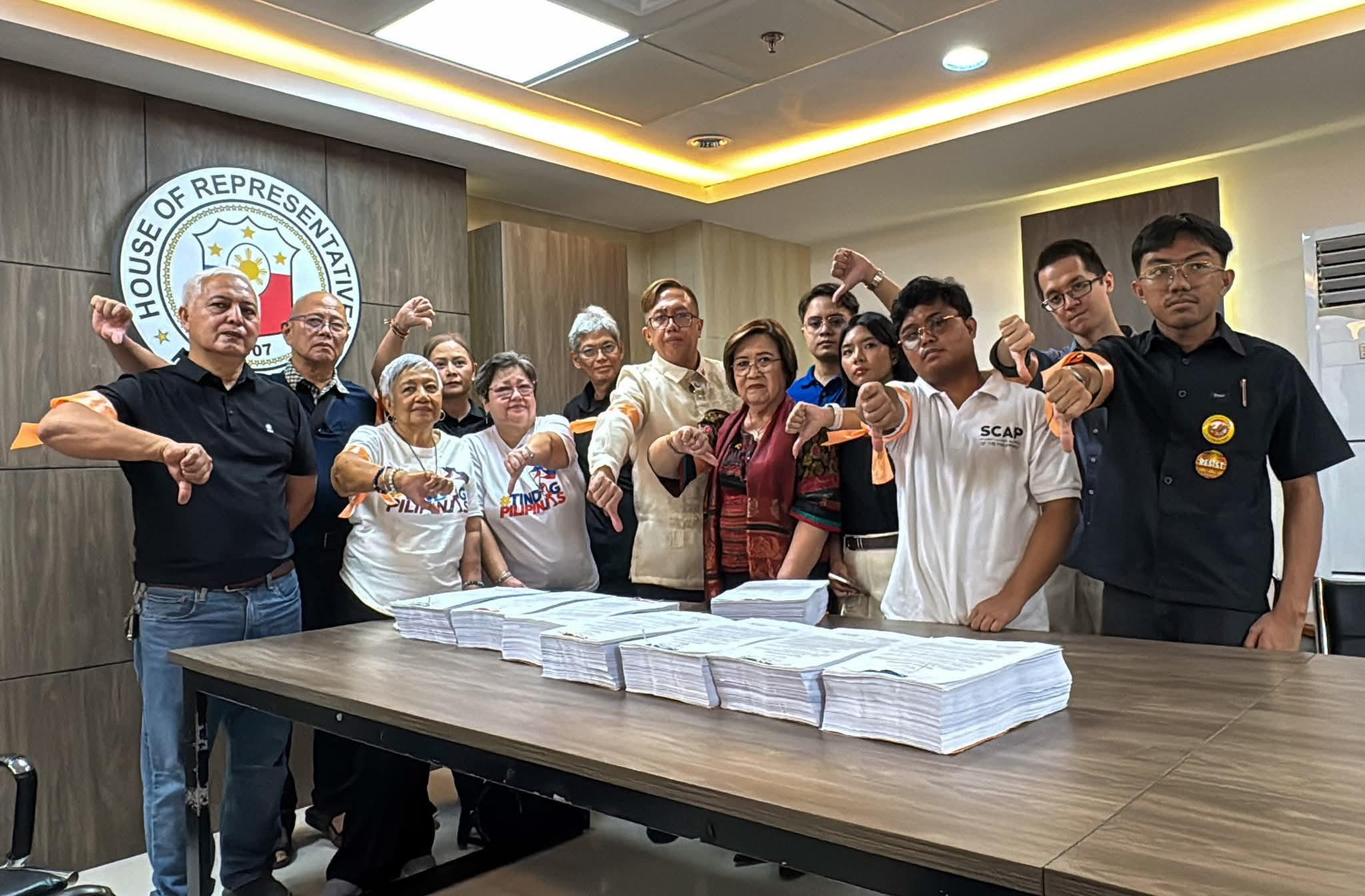
Akbayan and Mamamayang Liberal members giving thumbs down with the papers of impeachment complaints against Sara Duterte.

On February 2, 2026, two impeachment complaints was filed against Vice President Sara Duterte. The first came from the Makabayan bloc and the second came from a group led by Tindig Pilipinas, Akbayan and Mamamayang Liberal (ML). The two complaints were verified and transmitted to House speaker Bojie Dy on February 5. A third impeachment complaint by religious leaders against Duterte was filed on February 9. A fourth complaint was filed by lawyer Nathaniel Cabrera on February 18 and was transmitted to Dy's office the following day.

The four impeachment complaints all cites Duterte's alleged misuse of confidential funds, non-declaration of her assets, abuse of power, bribery, and threatening the lives of officials including President Marcos himself. The referral of the complaints to the House Committee on Justice on February 23, 2026, marked the official initiation of impeachment proceedings, activating the one-year ban on filing raps against the vice president.

The complaints cites the testimony of former Duterte aide Ramil Madriaga where he alleged the vice president ordered him to transport large amounts of money.

Verified impeachment complaints against Vice President Sara Duterte
| No. | Petitioners | Endorsers | Status |
|---|---|---|---|
| 1 | Makabayan | Antonio Tinio (ACT); Sarah Elago (Gabriela); Renee Co (Kabataan) | Set aside |
| 2 | Tindig Pilipinas, Akbayan and Mamamayang Liberal | Perci Cendaña (Akbayan); Leila de Lima (ML) | Withdrawn |
| 3 | Religious sector led by Joel Saballa, et al. | Leila de Lima (ML) | Active |
| 4 | Nathaniel G. Cabrera | Paolo Ortega (Lakas–CMD); Benny Abante (NUP) | Active |

=== Vetting of complaints ===
==== Sufficiency in form ====
On March 2, 2026, the second complaint of Tindig, Akbayan and ML were withdrawn in a bid to expedite the impeachment process and threw support for the third impeachment complaint. The Makabayan bloc's impeachment complaint was set aside for allegedly violating the one-year bar rule with some lawmakers arguing that the earliest complaint could be filed after the 2025 impeachment was on February 6, 2026. The third and fourth complaints were ruled "sufficient in form".

==== Sufficiency in substance ====
On March 4, 2026, the House Committee on Justice ruled that two impeachment complaints against Vice President Sara Duterte were sufficient in substance, allowing the proceedings to advance. Duterte was formally notified on March 5 and required to submit her response to the complaints within 10 days. Duterte filled her official response on March 16, and was allowed to make a response a day later since March 15 fell on a Sunday.

==== Sufficiency in grounds ====
On March 18, 2026, the two impeachment complaints against Sara Duterte were found sufficient in grounds by the House Committee on Justice, authorizing Congress to proceed to a hearing proper. This came after the Vice President submitted her Answer Ad Cautelam, which the House panel noted failed to address the allegations against her.

== Impeachment hearings ==
On March 25, 2026, the House Committee on Justice began formal hearings on the impeachment complaints against Vice President Sara Duterte through the issuance of subpoena over the various documents and relevant testimonies of witnesses and government officials. Duterte and her legal team did not attend the proceedings, with her camp criticizing the hearings as politically motivated and accusing the House leadership of prioritizing impeachment over pressing national concerns.

The hearings focused on allegations involving betrayal of public trust, culpable violation of the Constitution, misuse of confidential funds, unexplained wealth, and alleged threats against President Bongbong Marcos, First Lady Liza Araneta Marcos, and former House Speaker Martin Romualdez. The proceedings were conducted under procedures revised following the Supreme Court ruling in Duterte v. House of Representatives, which stressed that due process and procedural fairness must be observed throughout impeachment proceedings.

=== Day 1 (April 14) ===
On the first day of the hearings on April 14, 2026, detained businessman Ramil Madriaga, who claimed to be a former close associate of Duterte, testified before the committee and submitted a sworn affidavit detailing alleged political and financial operations involving the Duterte camp. Madriaga alleged the existence of a power-sharing agreement between Duterte and Marcos during the 2022 election campaign. According to his testimony and affidavit, former president Rodrigo Duterte allegedly discussed plans to either assassinate Marcos or remove him through a coup d'état should Marcos fail to honour commitments allegedly made to the Duterte family. Madriaga further claimed that senior Duterte allies explored possible military and police support for destabilization efforts against the Marcos administration.

Madriaga also testified regarding the alleged misuse of confidential funds during Duterte's tenure as Secretary of DepEd. He claimed that confidential funds were allegedly disbursed and liquidated within 24 hours, contradicting official liquidation reports which stated that the funds had been used over an 11-day operational period. Madriaga additionally alleged that several bank accounts had been opened and used by Duterte associates to facilitate the laundering of confidential funds through intermediary individuals and entities. Duterte allies and supporters dismissed Madriaga's testimony as fabricated and politically motivated.

The hearings also examined alleged irregularities involving confidential funds during Duterte's tenure as Secretary of Education and Vice President. Michael Poa, former chief of staff under the Office of the Vice President and former DepEd undersecretary, testified before the committee regarding the handling, use, and liquidation procedures governing confidential funds. Poa acknowledged signing several liquidation documents and certifications as part of his administrative duties while serving under Duterte, while lawmakers questioned the legitimacy of acknowledgment receipts and liquidation reports submitted in support of confidential fund disbursements.

The April 14 hearing also incorporated findings from the 2023 investigation conducted by the House Committee on Good Government and Public Accountability regarding alleged irregularities within the Department of Education (DepEd). During the earlier hearings, former DepEd undersecretary Gloria Mercado testified that she had received envelopes allegedly containing cash from Duterte's office in exchange for influencing decisions within the department's Bids and Awards Committee involving procurement contracts and supply acquisitions for DepEd. Mercado claimed that the payments were intended to influence procurement outcomes and approvals within the department. These findings and testimonies were cited and revisited during the impeachment hearings as part of allegations involving corruption, abuse of authority, and betrayal of public trust.

Likewise, the April 14 hearing also examined certifications issued by the Philippine Statistics Authority (PSA), which allegedly established that several names appearing as recipients of confidential funds either had no corresponding civil registry records or could not be validated through official government databases. Representatives of the National Bureau of Investigation (NBI) further testified that forensic handwriting examinations indicated that several signatures appearing on confidential fund acknowledgment receipts and liquidation reports were fictitious or forged. NBI handwriting experts informed the committee that multiple signatures displayed patterns consistent with fabrication and did not match authentic specimen signatures gathered during the investigation. These findings became central to the impeachment complaints alleging misuse of public funds, falsification of official documents, money laundering, and betrayal of public trust.

=== Day 2 (April 22) ===
On the second day of hearings on April 22, 2026, Duterte's financial records and allegations of unexplained wealth came under further scrutiny. The Office of the Ombudsman released subpoenaed copies of Duterte's Statements of Assets, Liabilities, and Net Worth (SALNs) covering the years 2007 to 2024, beginning from her tenure as Vice Mayor of Davao City. Lawmakers noted that both Duterte and her husband Mans Carpio consistently declared no cash on hand and no cash in banks in their SALNs from 2018 to 2024.

The Securities and Exchange Commission (SEC) also submitted audited financial statements and corporate filings of companies in which Duterte and Carpio held business interests. Several of the firms reportedly posted recurring losses or negative financial positions despite allegations raised during the hearings concerning substantial financial transactions linked to Duterte and her associates. SEC records further showed that a "Sarah Z. Duterte" was listed in the General Information Sheet (GIS) of Metro City Chow Foods as a member of the board of directors from 2022 to 2025, as well as a stockholder of the company. Representative Lordan Suan argued during the hearings that Duterte's continued listing as a corporate director while serving as vice president may have violated constitutional restrictions prohibiting public officials from holding private positions or interests that could conflict with public office.

The Bureau of Internal Revenue (BIR) subsequently presented a sealed box containing the income tax returns and tax records of Duterte, Carpio, and their associated firms. BIR Commissioner Charlito Mendoza informed the committee that the records could not be publicly disclosed or unsealed without proper legal authority due to confidentiality restrictions imposed under Section 270 of the National Internal Revenue Code of the Philippines (NIRC), which prohibits the unauthorized divulgence of taxpayer information by revenue officials. Mendoza stated that while the BIR complied with the subpoena by physically producing the records before the committee, any opening or public examination of the documents could expose revenue officials to criminal liability under the NIRC unless authorized by a competent tribunal or permitted by the taxpayer concerned. The committee subsequently voted 21–4 to defer opening the sealed box due to concerns regarding the legality of disclosing confidential tax records during impeachment proceedings.

Former senator Antonio Trillanes IV and representatives of the Anti–Money Laundering Council (AMLC) also testified during the proceedings. Trillanes presented testimony and documentary evidence concerning alleged bank accounts and financial transactions involving the Duterte family. He alleged that businessman Samuel Uy acted as a financial conduit for deposits made into accounts linked to Duterte and her husband Mans Carpio. Trillanes further alleged that Samuel Uy and businessman Michael Yang, a former economic adviser to President Rodrigo Duterte, were involved in narcotics trafficking operations and the laundering of illicit proceeds through corporate entities and bank accounts associated with the Duterte family.

The AMLC subsequently confirmed that banks had submitted 630 covered transaction reports (CTRs) and 33 suspicious transaction reports (STRs) involving accounts linked to Duterte and Carpio, amounting to ₱6,771,227,712.55 in transactions from 2006 to 2025. AMLC Executive Director Ronel Buenaventura testified that the reports included transactions flagged by banks due to unusually large cash movements and suspicious financial patterns. The council also confirmed deposits allegedly made by Samuel Uy into accounts associated with the Duterte couple, corroborating testimony and documentary evidence earlier presented by Trillanes during the hearings. Duterte allies denied the allegations and accused Trillanes of reviving unsubstantiated accusations previously raised against the Duterte family.

=== Day 3 (April 29) and vote on probable cause ===
On April 29, 2026, the third and final day of the impeachment hearings, the National Bureau of Investigation (NBI) Director Melvin Matibag testified during hearings on April 29, 2026, that Duterte's controversial "kill remarks" video against the Marcos family was authentic and showed no signs of editing, alteration, or AI manipulation.

At the same hearing, the committee voted 38–6 not to unseal the income tax records of Vice President Duterte and her husband Mans Carpio, but resolved to include the sealed documents as part of the official records of the impeachment proceedings for possible use by a future Senate impeachment court.

At the conclusion of the hearings on April 29, 2026, the committee voted 53–0 to find probable cause to impeach Duterte and consolidated the complaints into a single set of Articles of Impeachment. The committee report cited alleged misuse of confidential funds, possible falsification of official documents, threats against constitutional officials, betrayal of public trust, unexplained wealth, and conduct deemed incompatible with public office as grounds for impeachment.

=== Committee vote on the Consolidated Report and the Articles of Impeachment (May 4) ===
On May 4, 2026, the committee unanimously approved its report by a 55–0 vote, formally transmitting the Articles of Impeachment to the House of Representatives plenary for consideration on whether the complaint should be endorsed to the Senate for trial.

== Impeachment plenary vote from the House ==
House of Representatives vote Voted in favor of impeachment Voted against impeachment Abstained towards impeachment Did not vote for impeachment

All house representatives are scheduled whether to sign the articles of impeachment against Duterte scheduled on May 11, 2026. On May 10, 2026, a day before the plenary vote, PDP–Laban, a party led by former president Rodrigo Duterte and the father of Sara, threatened to blacklist the representatives who will vote on the articles of impeachment from the party. The party said that they will not be allowed to join, run under the party, and if necessary, the party will field their own candidate against them in the 2028 elections. Representatives Chel Diokno and Jude Acidre said that the threats won't affect the decisions of the representatives. Out of 318 house representatives on that day, 291 of them cast their votes which means 27 house representatives were either absent or were present but did not cast a vote. Deputy Speaker Representative Ferdinand Hernandez presided over the plenary vote and not House Speaker Bojie Dy. During the announcement of the vote the Representative Hernandez mistakenly announced that 255 members voted in the affirmative, 27 in the negative, and 9 abstentions. After session, the House corrected their count.

Garnering 257 votes in the affirmative, 25 in the negative, and 9 abstentions, the House of Representatives impeached Vice President Sara Duterte for the second time. Duterte became the first official in Philippine history to be impeached twice by the House. After the success of the plenary vote, the House tasked the Office of the Secretary General to formally transmit the articles of impeachment to the Senate for trial.

Tally of votes on the Articles of Impeachment
| Voted affirmative | Voted negative | Abstained | Did not vote | Reached 1/3 of the required votes? |
|---|---|---|---|---|
| 257 | 25 | 9 | 27 | Yes |

Votes by each house representative on the impeachment of Sara Duterte
| Representative | Constituency | Political party | Bloc | Voted in favor? |
|---|---|---|---|---|
| Joseph Bernos | Abra's lone | Lakas | Majority | Yes |
| Dale Corvera | Agusan del Norte's lone | Lakas | Majority | No |
| Alfel Bascug | Agusan del Sur's 1st | NUP | Majority | Absent |
| Eddiebong Plaza | Agusan del Sur's 2nd | NUP | Majority | Did not vote |
| Jess Marquez | Aklan's 1st | NPC | Majority | Yes |
| Florencio Miraflores | Aklan's 2nd | NPC | Majority | Yes |
| Krisel Lagman | Albay's 1st | Liberal | Minority | Yes |
| Caloy Loria | Albay's 2nd | NUP | Majority | Yes |
| Adrian Salceda | Albay's 3rd | Lakas | Majority | Yes |
| Ronaldo Puno | Antipolo's 1st | NUP | Majority | Yes |
| Bong Acop | Antipolo's 2nd | NUP | Majority | Yes |
| Antonio Legarda Jr. | Antique's lone | NPC | Majority | Yes |
| Eleanor Begtang | Apayao's lone | NPC | Majority | Yes |
| Rommel T. Angara | Aurora's lone | LDP | Majority | Yes |
| Albee Benitez | Bacolod's lone | Independent | Majority | Yes |
| Mauricio Domogan | Baguio's lone | Lakas | Majority | Yes |
| Yusop Alano | Basilan's lone | PFP | Majority | Did not vote |
| Antonino Roman III | Bataan's 1st | Lakas | Majority | Yes |
| Albert Garcia | Bataan's 2nd | NUP | Majority | Yes |
| Maria Angela Garcia | Bataan's 3rd | NUP | Majority | Yes |
| Jun Gato | Batanes's lone | NPC | Majority | Yes |
| Leandro Leviste | Batangas's 1st | Lakas | Independent | No |
| Gerville Luistro | Batangas's 2nd | Lakas | Majority | Yes |
| King Collantes | Batangas's 3rd | NPC | Majority | Yes |
| Caloy Bolilia | Batangas's 4th | Nacionalista | Majority | Yes |
| Beverley Dimacuha | Batangas's 5th | Nacionalista | Majority | Yes |
| Ryan Recto | Batangas's 6th | Nacionalista | Majority | Yes |
| Eric Yap | Benguet's lone | Lakas | Majority | Yes |
| Gerardo Espina Jr. | Biliran's lone | Lakas | Majority | Yes |
| Arman Dimaguila | Biñan's lone | Lakas | Majority | Yes |
| John Geesnell Yap | Bohol's 1st | NUP | Majority | Yes |
| Vanvan Aumentado | Bohol's 2nd | Lakas | Majority | No |
| Alexie Tutor | Bohol's 3rd | Lakas | Majority | No |
| Jose Manuel Alba | Bukidnon's 1st | Lakas | Majority | Absent |
| Jonathan Keith Flores | Bukidnon's 2nd | Lakas | Majority | Abstain |
| Audrey Zubiri | Bukidnon's 3rd | PFP | Minority | Abstain |
| Laarni Roque | Bukidnon's 4th | Nacionalista | Majority | No |
| Danny Domingo | Bulacan's 1st | NUP | Majority | Yes |
| Tina Pancho | Bulacan's 2nd | NUP | Majority | Yes |
| Cholo Violago | Bulacan's 3rd | PFP | Majority | Yes |
| Linabelle Villarica | Bulacan's 4th | PFP | Majority | Yes |
| Agay Cruz | Bulacan's 5th | PFP | Majority | Yes |
| Salvador Pleyto | Bulacan's 6th | PFP | Majority | Yes |
| Jose Aquino II | Butuan's lone | Lakas | Majority | Yes |
| Ramon Nolasco | Cagayan's 1st | Lakas | Majority | Yes |
| Baby Alfonso | Cagayan's 2nd | Lakas | Majority | Yes |
| Joseph Lara | Cagayan's 3rd | Lakas | Majority | Yes |
| Lordan Suan | Cagayan de Oro's 1st | PFP | Majority | Yes |
| Rufus Rodriguez | Cagayan de Oro's 2nd | CDP | Majority | Yes |
| Cha Hernandez | Calamba's lone | Lakas | Majority | Yes |
| Oscar Malapitan | Caloocan's 1st | Nacionalista | Majority | Yes |
| Edgar Erice | Caloocan's 2nd | Liberal | Minority | Abstain |
| Dean Asistio | Caloocan's 3rd | Lakas | Majority | Yes |
| Josefina Tallado | Camarines Norte's 1st | NPC | Majority | Yes |
| Rosemarie Panotes | Camarines Norte's 2nd | Lakas | Majority | Yes |
| Hori Horibata | Camarines Sur's 1st | NUP | Majority | Yes |
| Luigi Villafuerte | Camarines Sur's 2nd | NUP | Majority | Yes |
| Nelson Legacion | Camarines Sur's 3rd | Lakas | Majority | Yes |
| Arnulf Bryan Fuentebella | Camarines Sur's 4th | NPC | Majority | Yes |
| Miguel Luis Villafuerte | Camarines Sur's 5th | NUP | Majority | Yes |
| Jurdin Jesus Romualdo | Camiguin's lone | Lakas | Majority | Yes |
| Howard Guintu | Capiz's 1st | Independent | Majority | Yes |
| Jane Castro | Capiz's 2nd | Lakas | Majority | Yes |
| Eulogio Rodriguez | Catanduanes's lone | PFP | Majority | Yes |
| Jolo Revilla | Cavite's 1st | Lakas | Majority | Yes |
| Lani Mercado | Cavite's 2nd | Lakas | Majority | Yes |
| Adrian Jay Advincula | Cavite's 3rd | NUP | Majority | Yes |
| Kiko Barzaga | Cavite's 4th | PDP | Minority | No |
| Roy Loyola | Cavite's 5th | NPC | Majority | Yes |
| Antonio Ferrer | Cavite's 6th | NUP | Majority | Yes |
| Crispin Diego Remulla | Cavite's 7th | NUP | Majority | Yes |
| Aniela Tolentino | Cavite's 8th | NUP | Majority | Yes |
| Rhea Gullas | Cebu's 1st | Lakas | Majority | Yes |
| Edsel Galeos | Cebu's 2nd | Lakas | Majority | Yes |
| Karen Flores-Garcia | Cebu's 3rd | NUP | Majority | No |
| Sun Shimura | Cebu's 4th | NUP | Majority | No |
| Duke Frasco | Cebu's 5th | 1Cebu | Majority | Yes |
| Daphne Lagon | Cebu's 6th | Lakas | Majority | Yes |
| Patricia Calderon | Cebu's 7th | NPC | Majority | Yes |
| Rachel del Mar | Cebu City's 1st | NUP | Majority | No |
| Eduardo Rama Jr. | Cebu City's 2nd | Lakas | Majority | Yes |
| Edwin Cruzado | Cotabato's 1st | Lakas | Majority | Yes |
| Rudy Caoagdan | Cotabato's 2nd | Nacionalista | Majority | Yes |
| Samantha Santos | Cotabato's 3rd | Lakas | Majority | Yes |
| Paolo Duterte | Davao City's 1st | HTL | Independent | No |
| Omar Duterte | Davao City's 2nd | HTL | Independent | No |
| Isidro Ungab | Davao City's 3rd | HTL | Independent | No |
| Maricar Zamora | Davao de Oro's 1st | Lakas | Majority | Yes |
| Jhong Ceniza | Davao de Oro's 2nd | Lakas | Majority | Yes |
| De Carlo Uy | Davao del Norte's 1st | Lakas | Majority | Yes |
| Jose Manuel Lagdameo | Davao del Norte's 2nd | PFP | Majority | Yes |
| John Tracy Cagas | Davao del Sur's lone | Lakas | Majority | Yes |
| Claude Bautista | Davao Occidental's lone | NPC | Majority | Absent |
| Nelson Dayanghirang Jr. | Davao Oriental's 1st | Lakas | Majority | No |
| Cheeno Almario | Davao Oriental's 2nd | NPC | Majority | Absent |
| Kaka Bag-ao | Dinagat Islands's lone | Liberal | Minority | Yes |
| Sheen Gonzales | Eastern Samar's lone | NUP | Minority | Yes |
| Shirlyn Bañas-Nograles | General Santos's lone | PDP | Majority | No |
| JC Rahman Nava | Guimaras's lone | NUP | Majority | Yes |
| Solomon Chungalao | Ifugao's lone | NPC | Majority | Yes |
| Celso Regencia | Iligan's lone | Lakas | Majority | Yes |
| Sandro Marcos | Ilocos Norte's 1st | PFP | Majority | Yes |
| Eugenio Angelo Barba | Ilocos Norte's 2nd | Nacionalista | Majority | Yes |
| Ronald Singson | Ilocos Sur's 1st | NPC | Majority | Absent |
| Kristine Singson-Meehan | Ilocos Sur's 2nd | NPC | Majority | Did not vote |
| Janette Garin | Iloilo's 1st | Lakas | Majority | Yes |
| Kathryn Joyce Gorriceta | Iloilo's 2nd | Lakas | Majority | Yes |
| Lorenz Defensor | Iloilo's 3rd | NUP | Majority | Yes |
| Ferjenel Biron | Iloilo's 4th | Nacionalista | Majority | Yes |
| Binky April Tupas | Iloilo's 5th | Lakas | Majority | Yes |
| Julienne Baronda | Iloilo City's lone | Lakas | Majority | Yes |
| Tonypet Albano | Isabela's 1st | PFP | Majority | Yes |
| Ed Christopher Go | Isabela's 2nd | Lakas | Majority | Yes |
| Ian Paul Dy | Isabela's 3rd | Lakas | Majority | Yes |
| Joseph Tan | Isabela's 4th | PFP | Majority | Yes |
| Mike Dy III | Isabela's 5th | Lakas | Majority | Yes |
| Bojie Dy | Isabela's 6th | PFP | Majority | Yes |
| Caroline Agyao | Kalinga's lone | PFP | Majority | Yes |
| Paolo Ortega | La Union's 1st | Lakas | Majority | Yes |
| Dante Garcia | La Union's 2nd | Lakas | Majority | Yes |
| Ann Matibag | Laguna's 1st | Lakas | Majority | Yes |
| Ramil Hernandez | Laguna's 2nd | Lakas | Majority | No |
| Loreto Amante | Laguna's 3rd | Lakas | Majority | Yes |
| Benjamin Agarao Jr. | Laguna's 4th | PFP | Majority | Yes |
| Imelda Dimaporo | Lanao del Norte's 1st | PFP | Majority | Yes |
| Aminah Dimaporo | Lanao del Norte's 2nd | Lakas | Majority | Yes |
| Zia Alonto Adiong | Lanao del Sur's 1st | Lakas | Majority | Yes |
| Yasser Balindong | Lanao del Sur's 2nd | Lakas | Majority | Yes |
| Junard Chan | Lapu-Lapu City's lone | PFP | Majority | Yes |
| Mark Anthony Santos | Las Piñas's lone | Independent | Majority | Yes |
| Martin Romualdez | Leyte's 1st | Lakas | Majority | Yes |
| Lolita Javier | Leyte's 2nd | NPC | Majority | Yes |
| Anna Veloso-Tuazon | Leyte's 3rd | NUP | Majority | Yes |
| Richard Gomez | Leyte's 4th | PFP | Majority | Yes |
| Carl Cari | Leyte's 5th | Lakas | Majority | Yes |
| Dimple Mastura | Maguindanao del Norte's lone | Lakas | Majority | Abstain |
| Esmael Mangudadatu | Maguindanao del Sur's lone | PFP | Majority | Yes |
| Monique Lagdameo | Makati's 1st | MKTZNU | Majority | Yes |
| Alden Almario | Makati's 2nd | MKTZNU | Majority | Yes |
| Antolin Oreta III | Malabon's lone | NUP | Majority | Yes |
| Alexandria Gonzales | Mandaluyong's lone | NUP | Majority | Yes |
| Emmarie Dizon | Mandaue's lone | Lakas | Majority | Yes |
| Ernix Dionisio | Manila's 1st | NUP | Majority | Yes |
| Rolan Valeriano | Manila's 2nd | NUP | Majority | Yes |
| Joel Chua | Manila's 3rd | NUP | Majority | Yes |
| Giselle Lazaro-Maceda | Manila's 4th | NPC | Majority | Yes |
| Irwin Tieng | Manila's 5th | NUP | Majority | Yes |
| Benny Abante | Manila's 6th | NUP | Majority | Yes |
| Marcelino Teodoro | Marikina's 1st | NUP | Majority | Yes |
| Miro Quimbo | Marikina's 2nd | PFP | Majority | Yes |
| Reynaldo Salvacion | Marinduque's lone | Lakas | Majority | Yes |
| Antonio Kho | Masbate's 1st | Lakas | Majority | Yes |
| Olga Kho | Masbate's 2nd | Lakas | Majority | Yes |
| Wilton Kho | Masbate's 3rd | Lakas | Majority | Yes |
| Jason Almonte | Misamis Occidental's 1st | Nacionalista | Majority | Yes |
| Ando Oaminal | Misamis Occidental's 2nd | Lakas | Majority | Yes |
| Karen Lagbas | Misamis Oriental's 1st | NUP | Majority | Yes |
| Yevgeny Emano | Misamis Oriental's 2nd | Nacionalista | Majority | Yes |
| Maximo Dalog Jr. | Mountain Province's lone | Nacionalista | Majority | Yes |
| Jaime Fresnedi | Muntinlupa's lone | Liberal | Majority | Yes |
| Toby Tiangco | Navotas's lone | Navoteño | Majority | Yes |
| Jules Ledesma | Negros Occidental's 1st | NPC | Majority | Yes |
| Alfredo Marañon III | Negros Occidental's 2nd | NUP | Majority | Yes |
| Javi Benitez | Negros Occidental's 3rd | PFP | Majority | Yes |
| Jeffrey Ferrer | Negros Occidental's 4th | NUP | Majority | Yes |
| Dino Yulo | Negros Occidental's 5th | Lakas | Majority | Yes |
| Mercedes Alvarez-Lansang | Negros Occidental's 6th | NPC | Majority | Yes |
| Emmanuel Iway | Negros Oriental's 1st | PFP | Majority | Yes |
| Maisa Sagarbarria | Negros Oriental's 2nd | Lakas | Majority | Yes |
| Janice Degamo | Negros Oriental's 3rd | Lakas | Majority | Yes |
| Niko Raul Daza | Northern Samar's 1st | NUP | Minority | Yes |
| Edwin Ongchuan | Northern Samar's 2nd | PFP | Majority | Yes |
| Mika Suansing | Nueva Ecija's 1st | PFP | Majority | Yes |
| Kokoy Salvador | Nueva Ecija's 2nd | PFP | Majority | Yes |
| Jay Vergara | Nueva Ecija's 3rd | PFP | Majority | No |
| Emeng Pascual | Nueva Ecija's 4th | Lakas | Majority | Yes |
| Tim Cayton | Nueva Vizcaya's lone | Aksyon | Majority | Yes |
| Odie Tarriela | Occidental Mindoro's lone | PFP | Majority | Yes |
| Arnan Panaligan | Oriental Mindoro's 1st | Lakas | Majority | Yes |
| Alfonso Umali Jr. | Oriental Mindoro's 2nd | Liberal | Majority | Yes |
| Rose Salvame | Palawan's 1st | NUP | Majority | Yes |
| Jose Alvarez | Palawan's 2nd | NPC | Majority | Abstain |
| Gil Acosta Jr. | Palawan's 3rd | Lakas | Majority | Yes |
| Carmelo Lazatin Jr. | Pampanga's 1st | PFP | Majority | Yes |
| Gloria Macapagal Arroyo | Pampanga's 2nd | Lakas | Majority | Did not vote |
| Mica Gonzales | Pampanga's 3rd | Lakas | Majority | Yes |
| Anna York Bondoc | Pampanga's 4th | NUP | Majority | Yes |
| Arthur Celeste | Pangasinan's 1st | Nacionalista | Majority | Yes |
| Mark Cojuangco | Pangasinan's 2nd | NPC | Majority | Yes |
| Maria Rachel Arenas | Pangasinan's 3rd | Lakas | Majority | Yes |
| Gina de Venecia | Pangasinan's 4th | Lakas | Majority | Yes |
| Ramon Guico Jr. | Pangasinan's 5th | Lakas | Majority | Yes |
| Marlyn Primicias-Agabas | Pangasinan's 6th | Lakas | Majority | Yes |
| Eric Olivarez | Parañaque's 1st | Lakas | Majority | Yes |
| Brian Yamsuan | Parañaque's 2nd | NUP | Majority | Yes |
| Antonino Calixto | Pasay's lone | Lakas | Majority | Yes |
| Roman Romulo | Pasig's lone | NPC | Majority | Yes |
| Mark Enverga | Quezon's 1st | NPC | Majority | Yes |
| David Suarez | Quezon's 2nd | Lakas | Majority | Yes |
| Reynante Arrogancia | Quezon's 3rd | NPC | Majority | Yes |
| Keith Micah Tan | Quezon's 4th | NPC | Majority | Yes |
| Arjo Atayde | Quezon City's 1st | NUP | Majority | Yes |
| Ralph Tulfo | Quezon City's 2nd | PFP | Majority | Yes |
| Franz Pumaren | Quezon City's 3rd | NUP | Majority | Yes |
| Bong Suntay | Quezon City's 4th | UNA | Majority | No |
| Patrick Michael Vargas | Quezon City's 5th | PFP | Majority | Yes |
| Marivic Co-Pilar | Quezon City's 6th | NUP | Majority | Yes |
| Midy Cua | Quirino's lone | Lakas | Majority | Did not vote |
| Mia Ynares | Rizal's 1st | NPC | Majority | Absent |
| Dino Tanjuatco | Rizal's 2nd | NPC | Majority | Absent |
| Jose Arturo Garcia Jr. | Rizal's 3rd | NPC | Majority | Absent |
| Dennis Hernandez | Rizal's 4th | NPC | Majority | Did not vote |
| Eleandro Jesus Madrona | Romblon's lone | Nacionalista | Majority | Yes |
| Stephen James Tan | Samar's 1st | Nacionalista | Minority | Yes |
| Reynolds Michael Tan | Samar's 2nd | Lakas | Minority | Yes |
| Arthur Robes | San Jose del Monte's lone | Lakas | Majority | Yes |
| Bel Zamora | San Juan's lone | Lakas | Majority | Yes |
| Roy Gonzales | Santa Rosa's lone | Lakas | Majority | Yes |
| Steve Solon | Sarangani's lone | Lakas | Majority | Abstain |
| Zaldy Villa | Siquijor's lone | PFP | Majority | Yes |
| Dette Escudero | Sorsogon's 1st | NPC | Majority | Did not vote |
| Wowo Fortes | Sorsogon's 2nd | NPC | Majority | Yes |
| Ed Lumayag | South Cotabato's 1st | PFP | Majority | No |
| Dinand Hernandez | South Cotabato's 2nd | PFP | Majority | Presiding |
| Dibu Tuan | South Cotabato's 3rd | Lakas | Majority | Yes |
| Roger Mercado | Southern Leyte's 1st | NPC | Majority | No |
| Christopherson Yap | Southern Leyte's 2nd | Lakas | Majority | Did not vote |
| Ruth Sakaluran | Sultan Kudarat's 1st | Lakas | Majority | Yes |
| Bella Suansing | Sultan Kudarat's 2nd | PFP | Majority | Yes |
| Samier Tan | Sulu's 1st | Lakas | Majority | Yes |
| Abdulmunir Arbison | Sulu's 2nd | Lakas | Majority | Yes |
| Francisco Matugas | Surigao del Norte's 1st | PFP | Majority | Yes |
| Bernadette Barbers | Surigao del Norte's 2nd | Nacionalista | Majority | Yes |
| Romeo Momo | Surigao del Sur's 1st | Nacionalista | Majority | Yes |
| Alexander Pimentel | Surigao del Sur's 2nd | PFP | Majority | Yes |
| Ading Cruz | Taguig–Pateros's lone | Nacionalista | Majority | Abstain |
| Daniel Bocobo | Taguig's lone | Nacionalista | Majority | Abstain |
| Jaime Cojuangco | Tarlac's 1st | NPC | Majority | Yes |
| Cristy Angeles | Tarlac's 2nd | PFP | Majority | Yes |
| Bong Rivera | Tarlac's 3rd | NPC | Majority | Yes |
| Dimszar Sali | Tawi-Tawi's lone | NUP | Majority | Yes |
| Kenneth Gatchalian | Valenzeula's 1st | NPC | Majority | Yes |
| Gerald Galang | Valenzuela's 2nd | Lakas | Majority | Yes |
| Jay Khonghun | Zambales's 1st | Lakas | Majority | Yes |
| Bing Maniquiz | Zambales's 2nd | Lakas | Majority | Yes |
| Katrina Reiko Chua-Tai | Zamboanga City's 1st | Independent | Majority | Yes |
| Jerry Perez | Zamboanga City's 2nd | NUP | Majority | Did not vote |
| Pinpin Uy | Zamboanga del Norte's 1st | Lakas | Majority | Yes |
| Irene Labadlabad | Zamboanga del Norte's 2nd | Lakas | Majority | Yes |
| Ian Amatong | Zamboanga del Norte's 3rd | Liberal | Majority | Yes |
| Joseph Yu | Zamboanga del Sur's 1st | Lakas | Majority | Yes |
| Victoria Yu | Zamboanga del Sur's 2nd | Lakas | Majority | Yes |
| Marlo Bancoro | Zamboanga Sibugay's 1st | PFP | Majority | Yes |
| Marly Hofer–Hasim | Zamboanga Sibugay's 2nd | PFP | Majority | Yes |
| Rodge Gutierrez | Party-list | 1-Rider | Majority | Yes |
| Nathaniel Oducado | Party-list | 1Tahanan | Majority | Yes |
| Iris Marie Montes | Party-list | 4K | Minority | Yes |
| Marcelino Libanan | Party-list | 4Ps | Minority | Yes |
| Jonathan Clement Abalos | Party-list | 4Ps | Minority | Yes |
| Maximo Rodriguez Jr. | Party-list | Abamin | Majority | Yes |
| Manuel Frederick Ko | Party-list | Abang Lingkod | Majority | Yes |
| Robert Raymond Estrella | Party-list | Abono | Majority | Yes |
| Antonio Tinio | Party-list | ACT Teachers | Minority | Yes |
| Jocelyn Tulfo | Party-list | ACT-CIS | Majority | Yes |
| Jeffrey Soriano | Party-list | ACT-CIS | Majority | Yes |
| Nicanor Briones | Party-list | Agap | Minority | Yes |
| Bryan Revilla | Party-list | Agimat | Majority | Yes |
| Chel Diokno | Party-list | Akbayan | Minority | Yes |
| Perci Cendaña | Party-list | Akbayan | Minority | Yes |
| Dadah Kiram Ismula | Party-list | Akbayan | Minority | Yes |
| Alfredo Garbin | Party-list | Ako Bicol | Majority | Absent |
| Jan Franz Chan | Party-list | Ako Bicol | Majority | Absent |
| Sonny Lagon | Party-list | Ako Bisaya | Majority | Yes |
| Richelle Singson-Michael | Party-list | Ako Ilocano Ako | Majority | No |
| Maria Cristina Lopez | Party-list | Alona | Majority | Yes |
| Alfred delos Santos | Party-list | Ang Probinsyano | Majority | Absent |
| Sergio Dagooc | Party-list | Apec | Minority | Abstain |
| Henry Oaminal Jr. | Party-list | Asenso Pinoy | Majority | Yes |
| Roberto Nazal Jr. | Party-list | BH | Minority | No |
| Terry Ridon | Party-list | Bicol Saro | Majority | Yes |
| Eddie Villanueva | Party-list | Cibac | Majority | Did not vote |
| Felimon Espares | Party-list | Coop-NATCCO | Majority | Yes |
| Edwin Gardiola | Party-list | CWS | Majority | Yes |
| Claudine Bautista-Lim | Party-list | Dumper PTDA | Majority | Absent |
| Brian Poe | Party-list | FPJ Panday Bayanihan | Majority | Yes |
| Sarah Elago | Party-list | Gabriela | Minority | Yes |
| Jan Rurik Padiernos | Party-list | GP | Minority | Yes |
| Renee Co | Party-list | Kabataan | Minority | Yes |
| Caroline Tanchay | Party-list | Kamalayan | Majority | Yes |
| Eli San Fernando | Party-list | Kamanggagawa | Minority | Yes |
| Munir Arbison Jr. | Party-list | Kapuso PM | Majority | Yes |
| Kenneth Paolo Tereng | Party-list | KM Ngayon Na | Majority | Yes |
| Aiman Tan | Party-list | Kusug Tausug | Majority | Yes |
| Allan Ty | Party-list | LPGMA | Minority | Yes |
| Ferdinand Beltran | Party-list | Magbubukid | Majority | Yes |
| Girlie Veloso | Party-list | Malasakit@Bayanihan | Majority | No |
| Leila de Lima | Party-list | ML | Minority | Yes |
| Maria Nina Francesca Lacson | Party-list | Manila Teachers | Majority | Did not vote |
| Arthur C. Yap | Party-list | Murang Kuryente | Majority | Did not vote |
| Florabel Yatco | Party-list | Nanay | Majority | Yes |
| Maria Kristina Jihan Glepa | Party-list | One Coop | Majority | Yes |
| Presley de Jesus | Party-list | Philreca | Minority | Yes |
| Franz Vincent Legazpi | Party-list | Pinoy Workers | Majority | Yes |
| Harold Duterte | Party-list | PPP | Independent | No |
| Jernie Jett Nisay | Party-list | Pusong Pinoy | Minority | Did not vote |
| Paolo Marcoleta | Party-list | Sagip | Minority | No |
| Rodolfo Ordanes | Party-list | Senior Citizens | Majority | Yes |
| Ching Bernos | Party-list | Solid North | Majority | Yes |
| Rolando Macasaet | Party-list | SSS-GSIS Pensyonado | Majority | No |
| Arlyn Ayon | Party-list | Swerte | Minority | Absent |
| Jose Teves Jr. | Party-list | TGP | Majority | Yes |
| Andrew Julian Romualdez | Party-list | Tingog | Majority | Yes |
| Jude Acidre | Party-list | Tingog | Majority | Yes |
| Yedda Romualdez | Party-list | Tingog | Majority | Yes |
| Johanne Monich Bautista | Party-list | Trabaho | Majority | Yes |
| Raymond Mendoza | Party-list | TUCP | Majority | Yes |
| Milagros Magsaysay | Party-list | United Senior Citizens | Majority | Yes |
| Jojo Ang | Party-list | Uswag Ilonggo | Majority | Yes |

== Impeachment trial ==
The impeachment trial of Sara Duterte, the 15th vice president of the Philippines, began on July 6, 2026. Duterte had been impeached for a second time by the House of Representatives on May 11, 2026. She was the first vice president of the Philippines to be impeached, and the first to be impeached twice. The articles of impeachment alleged betrayal of public trust, culpable violation of the Constitution, graft and corruption, and bribery arising from the alleged misuse of the funds for the Office of the Vice President and the Department of Education (DepEd), where Duterte served as secretary from 2022 to 2024; unexplained wealth; alleged monetary gifts and payments to DepEd officials; and alleged threats to assassinate President Bongbong Marcos, First Lady Liza Araneta Marcos, and former House Speaker Martin Romualdez.

What would have been Duterte's first Senate impeachment trial was postponed after the impeachment court announced that the proceedings would resume only after the prosecution panel had been reconstituted, following the loss of several members of the 19th Congress in the 2025 elections or their assumption of office in other government posts. The articles of impeachment were subsequently declared null and void by the Supreme Court in July 2025, followed by the Senate impeachment court's decision to archive them in August 2025.

Senate President Sherwin Gatchalian opened the session on the first day of the trial, after which he called for the election of a presiding officer. On June 3, 2026, the Senate had amended Rule II of its rules of procedure on impeachment trials to allow the election, by majority vote, of a senator other than the Senate president as the court's presiding officer. Francis Escudero, who had presided over Duterte's first impeachment trial as Senate president in 2025, was elected to the position. The amendment was challenged by Senator-Judge Alan Peter Cayetano, who argued that the court could not amend a constitutional requirement that the Senate president preside over impeachment trials. Several other minority senators likewise objected, delaying the start of the trial by approximately one hour.

Members of the House prosecution panel include Representatives Gerville Luistro (lead prosecutor), Kaka Bag-ao, Joel Chua, Leila de Lima, Lorenz Defensor, Chel Diokno, Jonathan Keith Flores, Rodge Gutierrez, Terry Ridon, Lordan Suan, and Bel Zamora. Duterte's defense team is led by litigator Sheila Sison.

== Stances ==
The second largest bloc in the House of Representatives after Lakas–CMD, the National Unity Party has stated on February 25 that it would "most likely not vote in favor" of Duterte's impeachment unless new evidence was brought up. NUP chair and House deputy speaker Ronaldo Puno clarified that it was just a consensus among its party members and that it is not an official stance of the party. He said that members are allowed to exercise their conscience vote on the matter.

== Opinion polling ==
Public opinion polls of impeachment
| Polling body | Sample size | Margin of error | Support | Oppose | Undecided | Don't know | Date | Q |
|---|---|---|---|---|---|---|---|---|
| OCTA | 1,200 | ±3% | 74% | 21% | 4% | | April 20–24, 2026 | Do you think Vice President Sara Duterte should face trial in the Senate or an impeachment court to address the allegations against her or not? |
| OCTA | 1,200 | ±3% | 69% | 28% | 3% | | March 19–25, 2026 | Do you think Vice President Sara Duterte should face trial in the Senate or an impeachment court to address the allegations against her or not? |
| WR Numero | 1,455 | ±3% | 32% | 53% | 13% | 3% | March 10–17, 2026 | Do you agree or disagree that Vice President Sara Duterte should be impeached? |

== See also ==
- Efforts to impeach Bongbong Marcos
- Efforts to impeach Rodrigo Duterte
- Trial of Joseph Estrada
- Impeachment of Renato Corona
- Impeachment of Merceditas Gutierrez
- People Power Revolution
