= First impeachment of Sara Duterte =

2025 Philippine charging of vice president

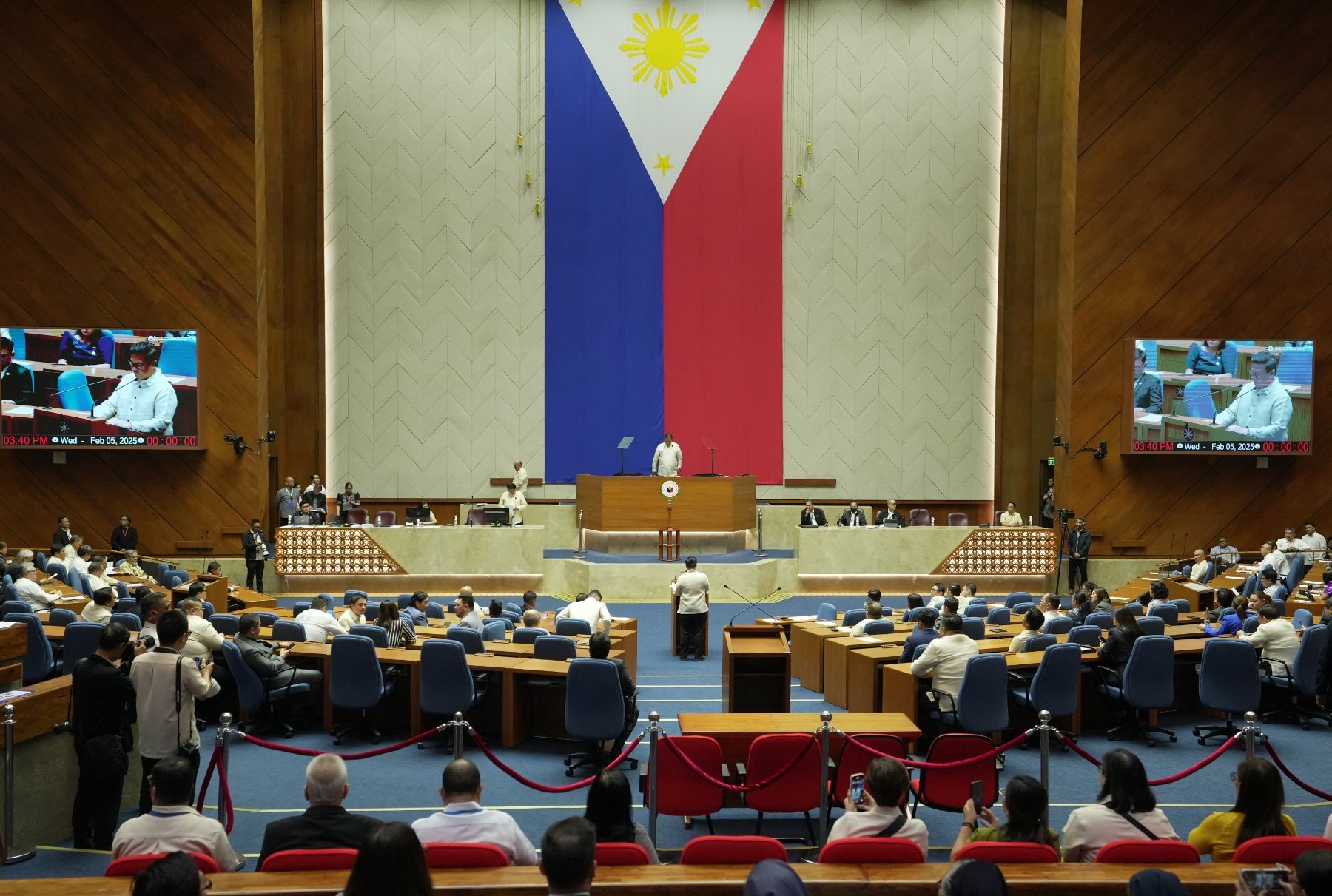
- The House of Representatives motions to impeach Vice President Sara Duterte on February 5, 2025
- Accused: Sara Duterte, 15th Vice President of the Philippines
- Date: February 5, 2025 – August 6, 2025 (6 months and 1 day)
- Outcome: Impeached by the House of Representatives (Note: Duterte was solely impeached but was never convicted or acquitted by the Philippine Senate after its decision to archive the impeachment articles following the Supreme court's nullification of the complaint.), remained in the office of the Vice President of the Philippines
- Charges: Culpable violation of the Constitution; Betrayal of public trust; Graft and corruption; Other high crimes
- Cause: Controversy over the use of confidential funds for both the Office of the Vice President and Department of Education; Alleged assassination threat against President Bongbong Marcos, First Lady Liza Marcos, and House Speaker Martin Romualdez; Involvement in extrajudicial killings of drug suspects

Impeachment vote by the House of Representatives (February 5, 2025)
- Votes in favor: 215 / 306 (70%) (Additional 25 verified as complainants)
- Not voting: 66 / 306 (22%)
- Result: Impeachment successful, previously being processed until its nullification by the Supreme Court

Vote by the Senate to remand the motion to the House of Representatives (June 10, 2025)
- Votes in favor: 18 / 23 (78%)
- Votes against: 5 / 23 (22%)
- Result: For certification of the House of Representative of the impeachment complaint for non-violation of the Constitution; and confirmation of the 20th Congress of the lower chamber if it was still willing to pursue the impeachment complaint

Future action by the House of Representatives
- Result: Certified the impeachment complaint as constitutional (June 11, 2025); 20th Congress confirmation on whether to pursue the complaint remained pending until its nullification by the Supreme Court

Ruling by the Supreme Court (July 25, 2025)
- Votes in favor: 13 / 15 (87%)
- Not voting: 2 / 15 (13%)
- Result: Ruled that the fourth impeachment complaint used to impeach Vice President Duterte was unconstitutional

Vote by the Senate to transfer the articles of impeachment to its archives (August 6, 2025)
- Votes in favor: 19 / 24 (79%)
- Votes against: 4 / 24 (17%)
- Present: 1 / 24 (4%)
- Result: Transferred the articles of impeachment to the archives; halted the trial pending the resolution of the motion for reconsideration filed by the House before the Supreme Court

In December 2024, four impeachment complaints were formally filed against Sara Duterte, the 15th vice president of the Philippines, who was serving under President Bongbong Marcos. The fourth complaint was approved by the House of Representatives on February 5, 2025, paving the way for an impeachment trial in the Senate.

The Senate convened months later, despite calls from impeachment proponents for the trial to begin immediately. On June 10, 2025, the Senate remanded the articles of impeachment to the House of Representatives.

On July 25, 2025, the Supreme Court ruled that the impeachment complaint against Duterte was unconstitutional, barring any new impeachment complaint against her until February 6, 2026. The Court also ruled that the Senate could not acquire jurisdiction over the case and that no impeachment trial would proceed. However, the Court maintained that it was not absolving Duterte of the allegations against her.

Duterte became the first vice president of the Philippines to be impeached, although she remained in office because the Senate did not render a final verdict.

== Background ==
=== Relationship between Marcos and Duterte ===
Bongbong Marcos and Sara Duterte were elected as president and vice president, respectively, in the 2022 Philippine election as part of the UniTeam alliance.

Duterte was appointed as Marcos's first secretary of education after they both took office in mid-2022, although she preferred to be secretary of defense. Over the next two years, Duterte's relationship with Marcos's allies deteriorated, particularly with House Speaker Martin Romualdez and First Lady Liza Araneta. She resigned in May 2023 from Lakas–CMD where she served as chairperson. Lakas is part of the ruling coalition. In January 2024, President Marcos insisted that the UniTeam is still "vibrant", referring to his working relationship with his deputy. Duterte tendered her resignation from her position as education secretary in June 2024. When asked about her friendship with Marcos in September 2024, she said they were never friends and merely running mates in the 2022 elections. Marcos responded by saying he was "deceived" about their supposed friendship. In October 2024, she detailed her fallout with Marcos, who she said "does not know how to be president".

==== Assassination threat ====
President Bongbong Marcos commented on the assassination threats on November 25

Don't worry, Ma'am, to my security because I already spoke with someone. I told him if I would get killed, you kill BBM, Liza Araneta and Martin Romualdez. No joke, no joke. I gave my orders. If I die — I said, 'Don't stop okay? Until you have killed them,' and he said 'yes.'

— Sara Duterte (in mix of Filipino and English), November 23, 2024; Zoom press conference

During a midnight press conference on November 22, 2024, initiated by Zuleika T. Lopez, Duterte claimed to have spoken with a contract killer to target President Marcos, his wife Liza, and House Speaker Romualdez in the event of her assassination, which the administration deemed an "active threat" against the government. She made the statement in response to a vlogger's question over her security. At the time, Duterte had been resisting the transfer of Lopez by House authorities to the Correctional Institution for Women. Duterte later clarified that her remarks were not serious threats but rather a reflection of her fear for her personal safety after hearing threats against her.

"Putangina ninyong lahat! Martin Romualdez, Liza Marcos, Bongbong Marcos! Ginigitgit niyo yung mga tao ko diyan sa envelope na yan. Liza Marcos naaalala mo nagpadala ka sa akin ng video? Sinabihan mo ako kung saan kukunin ang pera. Pinakita mo ang mukha ng tao sa video message mo.

— Sara Duterte (in mix of Filipino and English), November 23, 2024; Zoom press conference

On November 29, Marcos confirmed that he had directed the House of Representatives to refrain from filing an impeachment motion against Sara Duterte. This is despite his rift with Duterte which he described as "a storm in a teacup" and maintained that any potential effort to impeach his deputy would be a waste of time that it "does not make a difference to even one single Filipino life".

=== Confidential funds controversy ===
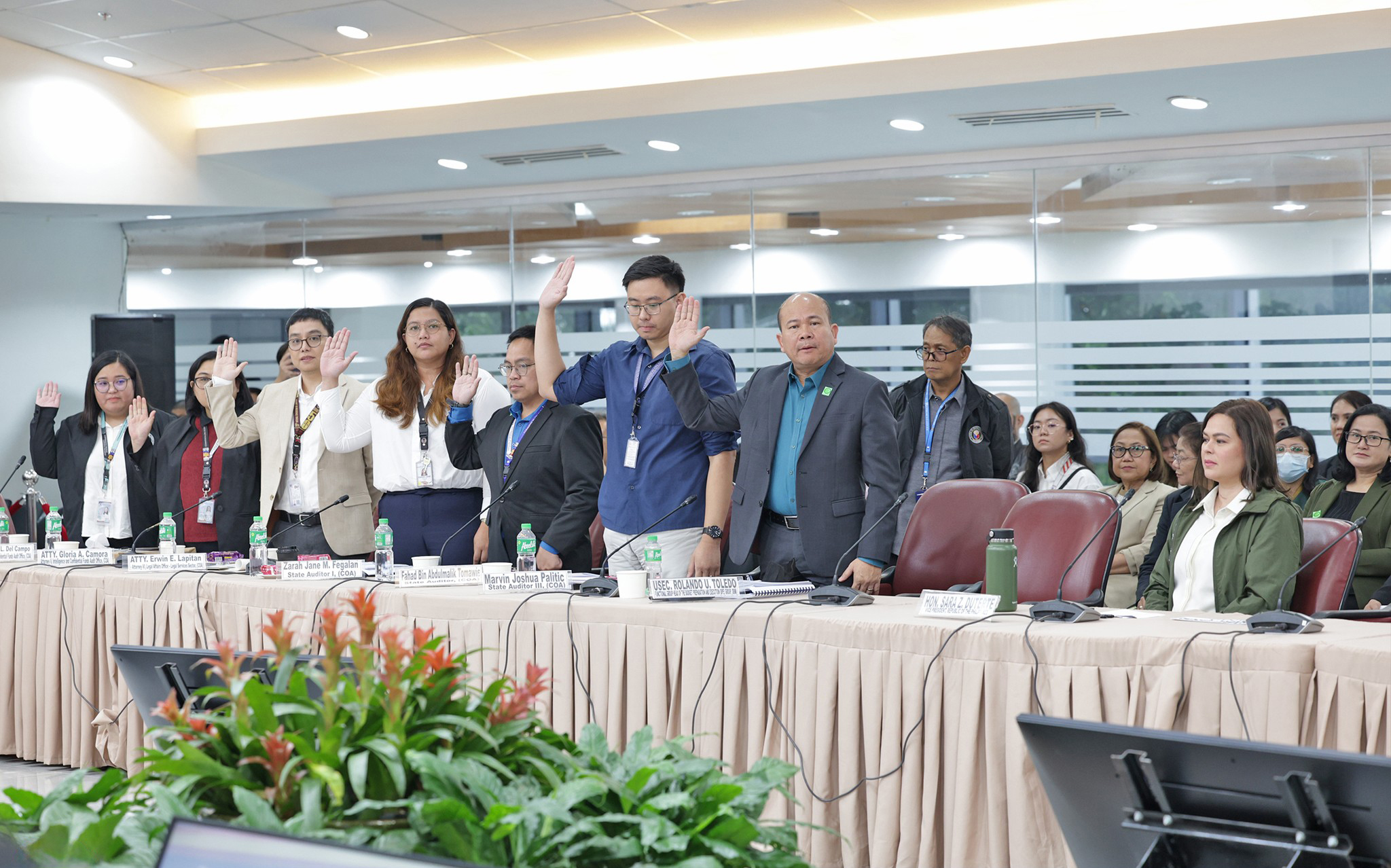
Duterte (far right) refused to take an oath at a congressional hearing on her office's budget use in September 2024.

In 2022 and 2023, Duterte made use of confidential and intelligence funds for both the OVP and DepEd; the OVP under her predecessor did not make use of confidential funds. According to Duterte's chief of staff, due to the OVP's compartmentalized structure, she handled her confidential funds in direct coordination with her office's special disbursing officer Gina F. Acosta without any intermediary.

In 2024, the lower chamber's Committee on Good Government and Public Accountability started investigations against the vice president's alleged misuse of funds after the approval of the 2025 OVP budget was deferred. On September 25, a former DepEd undersecretary alleged that Duterte gave out cash gifts worth ₱50 thousand monthly; later on, another former official also came forward, claiming that they received similar envelopes but had stopped by late 2023, around the same time the issue of confidential funds was raised. By November 2024, acknowledgement receipts from her offices submitted to the COA were revealed. Several lawmakers have expressed their doubts on the authenticity of the receipts, highlighting irregularities such as uncommon and allegedly fictitious names as well as discrepancies in the dates and signatures. Duterte claimed that she has not seen the receipts. On December 9, 2024, the Philippine Statistics Authority reported that the names of 60% of the 677 individuals that were named as recipients of confidential funds from DepEd had no records in the national civil registry.

=== South China Sea ===
Duterte has been noted for not issuing explicit statements on the dispute between the Philippines and China in the South China Sea. She has declined to comment on the matter, instead deferring people to the Department of Foreign Affairs and the Department of National Defense when queried on such matters. For this, she received criticism by some officials, including by allies of Marcos in the House of Representatives and Philippine Coast Guard spokesperson for the West Philippine Sea Jay Tarriela. However, Marcos defended Duterte, stating that "[it is] not the role of the Vice President or the Secretary of Education to talk about China".

=== Prior impeachment plans ===
The Makabayan bloc considered filing an impeachment case against Duterte back in August 2023 over alleged misuse of confidential funds of the Office of the Vice President for 2022, which ACT Teachers representative France Castro from the Makabayan bloc described as an "impeachable offense". Castro later judged the plan as "premature", citing the need to continue with the House investigation.

In August 2024, Sara Duterte said she expects an impeachment case to be filed against her following her fallout with the president and information she heard from allies within the lower house. In September 2024, Bagong Alyansang Makabayan described the impeachment of Duterte as necessary over her use of confidential funds in 2022 and 2023. In the same month, the House of Representatives denied any plot to file an impeachment complaint.

== Complaints ==
=== December 2024 complaints ===
On December 2, 2024, the first formal impeachment case was lodged against Vice President Sara Duterte. The complaint listed 24 articles which was categorized in four points: graft and corruption, bribery, betrayal of public trust, and other high crimes. Aside from corruption, other cited reasons include her alleged role in the extrajudicial killings of the drug suspects and failure to make a stance against China's aggressive sovereignty claims in the dispute over the West Philippine Sea (South China Sea dispute).

The second impeachment complaint against Duterte was filed on December 4, 2024, by 70 activists led by the Bagong Alyansang Makabayan. They cited a single reason which is betrayal of public trust over the illegal use and mishandling of confidential funds. Duterte is accused of committing "gross abuse of discretionary powers" over the ₱612.5 million confidential funds of the Office of the Vice President and the Department of Education.

On December 5, 2024, House Secretary General Reginald Velasco disclosed that a third complaint by select members of the House of Representatives was being prepared. The complaint was filed by a group of religious workers, lawyers and civil society workers in the House of Representatives against Duterte on December 19 for betrayal of public trust.

=== Fourth impeachment complaint ===
On February 5, 2025, 215 members of the House of Representatives signed an impeachment complaint against Duterte on charges that include corruption, plotting to assassinate President Bongbong Marcos, involvement in extrajudicial killings and incitement to insurrection and public disorder. The impeachment complaint attained more than the minimum 102 signatures, or a third of the House of Representatives as required in the Constitution. With the signature threshold reached, the impeachment complaint constitutes as the formal Articles of Impeachment against Duterte and was transmitted to the Senate without a plenary vote. This marks the fourth complaint filed against Duterte. On February 7, House Secretary General Reginald Velasco said that an additional 25 lawmakers had signed documents adding their names in support of the impeachment complaint, putting the total number of signees to 240.

Among the signatories of the impeachment complaint was President Marcos's son, Ilocos Norte representative Sandro Marcos, and Speaker Romualdez. At least 101 lawmakers from Luzon and 40 from the Visayas also signed the complaint. In Duterte's home island of Mindanao, 41 of its 60 district representatives supported impeachment. However, in her native Davao Region, only Davao del Sur representative John Tracy Cagas signed the complaint out a total of 11 district representatives. Thirty-three of 61 party-list representatives also supported impeachment.

==== Articles of Impeachment ====
These are the Articles of Impeachment against Vice President Sara Duterte:

The third article concerns the allegation that Duterte bribed high ranking Department of Education officials while the fifth article involves her linkage to extrajudicial killings which happened during her father and former president Rodrigo Duterte's war on drugs, including the Davao Death Squad.

#	Case	Violation
1	Contracting an assassin and plotting to murder or assassinate the incumbent president, the first lady, and Former speaker of the House of Representatives, as publicly admitted by her in a live broadcast.	Betrayal of public trust Culpable violation of the constitution Other high crimes
2	Misuse and malversation of confidential funds appropriated to the Office of the Vice President (OVP) and the Department of Education (DepEd)	Betrayal of public trust Graft and corruption
3	In Violation of Republic Act No. 3019	Betrayal of public trust Bribery; Graft and corruption
4	Amassing unexplained wealth and failing to disclose all her properties and interests in properties in her statement of assets and net worth (SALN), in Violation of Section 17, Article XI of the 1987 Philippine Constitution.	Culpable violation of the constitution Betrayal of public trust
5	High crime of murder and conspiracy to commit murder.	Other high crimes
6	By herself and/or in concert with others, committed acts of destabilization and sedition and insurrection.	Betrayal of public trust Other high crimes
7	Totality of Respondent's conduct as Vice-President, including her commission of the foregoing acts	Betrayal of public trust Culpable violation of the constitution Graft and corruption

==== Signatories ====
House of Representatives vote (by district only) Voted in favor of impeachment Additional votes in favor of impeachment (February 6, 2025; for verification) Did not vote in favor of impeachment District is vacant

A total of 215 lawmakers signed the impeachment complaint against vice president Sara Duterte on February 5, 2025. Sandro Marcos (Ilocos Norte–1st), who is also the son of President Bongbong Marcos, was the first to affix his signature; House Speaker Martin Romualdez was the last. It was noted that 41 out of 60 lawmakers from Mindanao voted to impeach Sara Duterte. In the Duterte family's home region of Davao, only John Tracy Cagas (Davao del Sur) was in favor of the vice president's impeachment.

On the following day, 25 more legislators who were previously not physically present affixed their signatures.

Members of the House of Representatives who signed the impeachment complaint against Vice President Sara Duterte
No.	Portrait	Representative	Party	District	Bloc
1		Sandro Marcos	PFP	Ilocos Norte–1st	Majority
2		Aurelio Gonzales Jr.	Lakas	Pampanga–3rd	Majority
3		Manuel Jose Dalipe	Lakas	Zamboanga City–2nd	Majority
4		Jurdin Jesus Romualdo	Lakas	Camiguin–Lone	Majority
5		David C. Suarez	Lakas	Quezon–2nd	Majority
6		Jay Khonghun	Lakas	Zambales–1st	Majority
7		Anna Suarez	ALONA	Party-list	Majority
8		Paolo Ortega	Lakas	La Union–1st	Majority
9		Rodge Gutierrez	1-Rider	Party-list	Minority
10		Yasser Balindong	Lakas	Lanao del Sur–2nd	Majority
11		Lex Anthony Colada	AAMBIS-Owa	Party-list	Minority
12		Stephen Paduano	Abang Lingkod	Party-list	Minority
13		Jude Acidre	Tingog	Party-list	Majority
14		Danilo Fernandez	NUP	Santa Rosa–Lone	Majority
15		Zia Alonto Adiong	Lakas	Lanao del Sur–1st	Majority
16		Yedda Romualdez	Tingog	Party-list	Majority
17		Pammy Zamora	Lakas	Taguig–2nd	Majority
18		Janette Garin	Lakas	Iloilo–1st	Majority
19		Marvin Rillo	Lakas	Quezon City–4th	Majority
20		Raul Tupas	Lakas	Iloilo–5th	Majority
21		Ernix Dionisio	Lakas	Manila–1st	Majority
22		Irwin Tieng	Lakas	Manila–5th	Majority
23		Fidel Nograles	Lakas	Rizal–4th	Majority
24		Rolando Valeriano	NUP	Manila–2nd	Majority
25		Wowo Fortes	NPC	Sorsogon–2nd	Majority
26		Emeng Pascual	Lakas	Nueva Ecija–4th	Majority
27		Presley de Jesus	PHILRECA	Party-list	Minority
28		Ace Barbers	Nacionalista	Surigao del Norte–2nd	Majority
29		Sergio Dagooc	APEC	Party-list	Minority
30		Loreto Amante	Lakas	Laguna–3rd	Majority
31		Rommel T. Angara	LDP	Aurora–Lone	Majority
32		Wilter Palma	Lakas	Zamboanga Sibugay–1st	Majority
33		Solomon Chungalao	NPC	Ifugao–Lone	Majority
34		Miguel Luis Villafuerte	NUP	Camarines Sur–5th	Majority
35		Ando Oaminal	Lakas	Misamis Occidental–2nd	Majority
36		Mike Dy III	Lakas	Isabela–5th	Majority
37		Michael Morden	API	Party-list	Majority
38		Allen Jesse Mangaoang	Nacionalista	Kalinga–Lone	Majority
39		Alfredo Marañon III	NUP	Negros Occidental–2nd	Majority
40		Peter Miguel	Lakas	South Cotabato–2nd	Majority
41		Carlito Marquez	NPC	Aklan–1st	Majority
42		Dante Garcia	Lakas	La Union–2nd	Majority
43		Gerardo Espina Jr.	Lakas	Biliran–Lone	Majority
44		Lorenz Defensor	NUP	Iloilo–3rd	Majority
45		Gerardo Valmayor Jr.	NPC	Negros Occidental–1st	Majority
46		Nicanor Briones	AGAP	Party-list	Majority
47		Ann Matibag	Lakas	Laguna–1st	Majority
48		Irene Gay Saulog	Kalinga	Party-list	Majority
49		Ray T. Reyes	Anakalusugan	Party-list	Majority
50		Tawi Billones	Liberal	Capiz–1st	Majority
51		Jun Gato	NPC	Batanes–Lone	Majority
52		Danny Domingo	NUP	Bulacan–1st	Majority
53		Neptali Gonzales II	NUP	Mandaluyong–Lone	Majority
54		Fernando Cabredo	NUP	Albay–3rd	Majority
55		Mohamad Paglas	Lakas	Maguindanao del Sur–Lone	Majority
56		Teodorico Haresco Jr.	Nacionalista	Aklan–2nd	Majority
57		Jonathan Clement Abalos	4Ps	Party-list	Minority
58		Rodolfo Ordanes	Senior Citizens	Party-list	Majority
59		Salvador Pleyto	Lakas	Bulacan–6th	Majority
60		Ambrosio Cruz	Lakas	Bulacan–5th	Majority
61		Milagros Magsaysay	United Senior Citizens	Party-list	Majority
62		Gabriel Bordado	Liberal	Camarines Sur–3rd	Minority
63		Marivic Co-Pilar	NUP	Quezon City–6th	Majority
64		Mitch Cajayon-Uy	Lakas	Caloocan–2nd	Majority
65		Harris Ongchuan	NUP	Northern Samar–2nd	Minority
66		Paul Daza	NUP	Northern Samar–1st	Minority
67		Ed Lumayag	PFP	South Cotabato–1st	Majority
68		Leo Rodriguez	PFP	Catanduanes–Lone	Majority
69		Carmelo Lazatin II	Lakas	Pampanga–1st	Majority
70		Joseph Tan	Lakas	Isabela–4th	Majority
71		Kristine Singson-Meehan	NPC	Ilocos Sur–2nd	Majority
72		Ed Christopher Go	Lakas	Isabela–2nd	Majority
73		Joel Chua	Lakas	Manila–3rd	Majority
74		Marjorie Ann Teodoro	NUP	Marikina–1st	Majority
75		Manuel Sagarbarria	NPC	Negros Oriental–2nd	Majority
76		Zaldy Villa	Lakas	Siquijor–Lone	Majority
77		Ysabel Zamora	Lakas	San Juan–Lone	Majority
78		Inno Dy	Lakas	Isabela–6th	Majority
79		Franz Pumaren	NUP	Quezon City–3rd	Majority
80		Juliet Marie Ferrer	NUP	Negros Occidental–4th	Majority
81		Luis Raymund Villafuerte	NUP	Camarines Sur–2nd	Majority
82		Roberto Puno	NUP	Antipolo–1st	Majority
83		Bing Maniquiz	Lakas	Zambales–2nd	Majority
84		Marissa Magsino	OFW	Party-list	Minority
85		Geraldine Roman	Lakas	Bataan–1st	Majority
86		Crispin Diego Remulla	NUP	Cavite–7th	Majority
87		Roy Loyola	NPC	Cavite–5th	Majority
88		Antonino Calixto	Lakas	Pasay–Lone	Majority
89		Romeo Momo	Nacionalista	Surigao del Sur–1st	Majority
90		Celso Regencia	Lakas	Iligan–Lone	Majority
91		Lorna Silverio	NUP	Bulacan–3rd	Majority
92		Ching Bernos	Lakas	Abra–Lone	Majority
93		Benny Abante	NUP	Manila–6th	Majority
94		Eleanor Begtang	NPC	Apayao–Lone	Majority
95		Baby Alfonso	Lakas	Cagayan–2nd	Majority
96		Josefina Tallado	Lakas	Camarines Norte–1st	Majority
97		Augustina Dominique Pancho	NUP	Bulacan–2nd	Majority
98		Jose Teves Jr.	TGP	Party-list	Majority
99		Francisco Jose Matugas II	Lakas	Surigao del Norte–1st	Majority
100		James Ang Jr.	Uswag Ilonggo	Party-list	Majority
101		Jane Castro	Lakas	Capiz–2nd	Majority
102		Alan Ecleo	Lakas	Dinagat Islands–Lone	Majority
103		Antonio Ferrer	NUP	Cavite–6th	Majority
104		Maria Angela Garcia	NUP	Bataan–3rd	Majority
105		Loreto Acharon	NPC	General Santos–Lone	Majority
106		Steve Solon	Lakas	Sarangani	Majority
107		Keith Micah Tan	NPC	Quezon–4th	Majority
108		Reynante Arrogancia	NPC	Quezon–3rd	Minority
109		Ricardo Cruz Jr.	Nacionalista	Taguig–1st	Majority
110		Ralph Tulfo	PFP	Quezon City–2nd	Majority
111		Dean Asistio	Lakas	Caloocan–3rd	Majority
112		Dimszar Sali	NUP	Tawi-Tawi–Lone	Majority
113		Ronald Singson	NPC	Ilocos Sur–1st	Majority
114		Hori Horibata	NUP	Camarines Sur–1st	Majority
115		Julienne Baronda	Lakas	Iloilo City–Lone	Majority
116		Ivan Howard Guintu	PINUNO	Party-list	Majority
117		Arjo Atayde	Nacionalista	Quezon City–1st	Majority
118		Edgar Chatto	NUP	Bohol–1st	Majority
119		Vanvan Aumentado	Lakas	Bohol–2nd	Majority
120		Alexie Tutor	Lakas	Bohol–3rd	Majority
121		Mark Enverga	NPC	Quezon–1st	Majority
122		Pinpin Uy	Lakas	Zamboanga del Norte–1st	Majority
123		Alfel Bascug	NUP	Agusan del Sur–1st	Majority
124		Christian Unabia	Lakas	Misamis Oriental–1st	Majority
125		Lordan Suan	Lakas	Cagayan de Oro–1st	Majority
126		Yevgeny Emano	Nacionalista	Misamis Oriental–2nd	Majority
127		Joselito Sacdalan	NPC	Cotabato–1st	Majority
128		Albert Garcia	NUP	Bataan–2nd	Majority
129		Patrick Michael Vargas	Lakas	Quezon City–5th	Majority
130		Jose Aquino II	Lakas	Agusan del Norte–1st	Majority
131		France Castro	ACT Teachers	Party-list	Minority
132		Jam Agarao	PFP	Laguna–4th	Majority
133		Arlene Brosas	Gabriela	Party-list	Minority
134		Raoul Manuel	Kabataan	Party-list	Minority
135		Anna Veloso-Tuazon	NUP	Leyte–3rd	Majority
136		Cha Hernandez	Lakas	Calamba–Lone	Majority
137		Jaime Cojuangco	NPC	Tarlac–1st	Majority
138		Victoria Yu	Lakas	Zamboanga del Sur–2nd	Majority
139		Munir Arbison Jr.	Lakas	Sulu–2nd	Majority
140		Angelica Natasha Co	BHW	Party-list	Majority
141		Perci Cendaña	Akbayan	Party-list	Minority
142		John Tracy Cagas	Nacionalista	Davao del Sur–Lone	Majority
143		Joseph Gilbert Violago	NUP	Nueva Ecija–2nd	Majority
144		Edwin Olivarez	Lakas	Parañaque–1st	Majority
145		Stella Quimbo	Lakas	Marikina–2nd	Majority
146		Gustavo Tambunting	NUP	Parañaque–2nd	Majority
147		Mercedes Lansang	NPC	Negros Occidental–6th	Majority
148		Mika Suansing	Lakas	Nueva Ecija–1st	Majority
149		Rachel del Mar	NPC	Cebu City–1st	Majority
150		Peter John Calderon	NPC	Cebu–7th	Majority
151		Jocelyn Limkaichong	NPC	Negros Oriental–1st	Majority
152		Janice Salimbangon	NUP	Cebu–4th	Majority
153		Rhea Gullas	Lakas	Cebu–1st	Majority
154		Daphne Lagon	Lakas	Cebu–6th	Majority
155		Dimple Mastura	Lakas	Maguindanao del Norte–Lone	Majority
156		Edsel Galeos	Lakas	Cebu–2nd	Majority
157		Johnny Pimentel	NUP	Surigao del Sur–2nd	Majority
158		Emmarie Dizon	Lakas	Mandaue–Lone	Majority
159		Eddiebong Plaza	NUP	Agusan del Sur–2nd	Majority
160		Christopherson Yap	Lakas	Southern Leyte–2nd	Majority
161		Jason Almonte	Nacionalista	Misamis Occidental–1st	Majority
162		Mario Vittorio Mariño	Nacionalista	Batangas–5th	Majority
163		Romeo Acop	NUP	Antipolo–2nd	Majority
164		Maximo Dalog Jr.	Nacionalista	Mountain Province–Lone	Majority
165		Jonathan Keith Flores	Lakas	Bukidnon–2nd	Majority
166		Marcelino Libanan	4Ps	Party-list	Minority
167		Laarni Roque	Nacionalista	Bukidnon–4th	Majority
168		Mark Go	Nacionalista	Baguio–Lone	Majority
169		Tata Eudela	Lakas	Zamboanga Sibugay–2nd	Majority
170		Luz Mercado	Lakas	Southern Leyte–1st	Majority
171		Maria Fe Abunda	Lakas	Eastern Samar–Lone	Majority
172		Joseph Lara	Lakas	Cagayan–3rd	Majority
173		Maria Theresa Collantes	NPC	Batangas–3rd	Majority
174		Arnan Panaligan	Lakas	Oriental Mindoro–1st	Majority
175		Felimon Espares	Coop-NATCCO	Party-list	Minority
176		Lucille Nava	NUP	Guimaras–Lone	Majority
177		Glona Labadlabad	Lakas	Zamboanga del Norte–2nd	Majority
178		Odie Tarriela	PFP	Occidental Mindoro–Lone	Majority
179		Eleandro Jesus Madrona	Nacionalista	Romblon–Lone	Majority
180		Divina Grace Yu	Lakas	Zamboanga del Sur–1st	Majority
181		Jil Bongalon	Ako Bicol	Party-list	Majority
182		Gerville Luistro	Lakas	Batangas–2nd	Majority
183		Jose Manuel Alba	Lakas	Bukidnon–1st	Majority
184		Luisa Cuaresma	UNA	Nueva Vizcaya–Lone	Majority
185		Allan Ty	LPGMA	Party-list	Majority
186		Oscar Malapitan	Nacionalista	Caloocan–1st	Majority
187		Aminah Dimaporo	Lakas	Lanao del Norte–2nd	Majority
188		Jernie Jett Nisay	Pusong Pinoy	Party-list	Majority
189		Ian Amatong	Liberal	Zamboanga del Norte–3rd	Majority
190		Maria Rachel Arenas	Lakas	Pangasinan–3rd	Majority
191		Marlyn Primicias-Agabas	PFP	Pangasinan–6th	Majority
192		Linabelle Villarica	PFP	Bulacan–4th	Majority
193		Eric Buhain	Nacionalista	Batangas–1st	Majority
194		Christopher de Venecia	Lakas	Pangasinan–4th	Majority
195		Cynthia Chan	Lakas	Lapu-Lapu City–Lone	Majority
196		Arnulf Bryan Fuentebella	NPC	Camarines Sur–4th	Majority
197		Raymond Mendoza	TUCP	Party-list	Majority
198		Roman Romulo	NPC	Pasig–Lone	Majority
199		Mark Cojuangco	NPC	Pangasinan–2nd	Majority
200		Ferjenel Biron	Nacionalista	Iloilo–4th	Majority
201		Samier Tan	Lakas	Sulu–1st	Majority
202		Anna York Bondoc	Nacionalista	Pampanga–4th	Majority
203		Jaime Fresnedi	Liberal	Muntinlupa–Lone	Majority
204		Tirso Edwin Gardiola	CWS	Party-list	Majority
205		Lolita Javier	Nacionalista	Leyte–2nd	Majority
206		Michael Gorriceta	Nacionalista	Iloilo–2nd	Majority
207		Jorge Antonio Bustos	PATROL	Party-list	Majority
208		Duke Frasco	NUP	Cebu–5th	Majority
209		Aniela Tolentino	NUP	Cavite–8th	Majority
210		Jocelyn Tulfo	ACT-CIS	Party-list	Majority
211		Greg Gasataya	NPC	Bacolod–Lone	Majority
212		Ruth Hernandez	Lakas	Laguna–2nd	Majority
213		Maria Alana Samantha Santos	Lakas	Cotabato–3rd	Majority
214		Florida Robes	PFP	San Jose del Monte–Lone	Majority
215		Martin Romualdez	Lakas	Leyte–1st	Majority
216		Len Alonte (Note: Verified as impeachment complainant on February 6, 2025.)	Lakas	Biñan–Lone	Majority
217		Ramon Nolasco Jr.	Lakas	Cagayan–1st	Majority
218		Tonypet Albano	Lakas	Isabela–1st	Majority
219		Mohamad Khalid Dimaporo	Lakas	Lanao del Norte–1st	Majority
220		Carl Cari	Lakas	Leyte–5th	Majority
221		Richard Kho	Lakas	Masbate–1st	Majority
222		Ara Kho	Lakas	Masbate–2nd	Majority
223		Wilton Kho	Lakas	Masbate–3rd	Majority
224		Dino Yulo	Lakas	Negros Occidental–5th	Majority
225		Midy Cua	Lakas	Quirino–Lone	Majority
226		Rihan Sakaluran	Lakas	Sultan Kudarat–1st	Majority
227		Ramon Guico Jr.	Lakas	Pangasinan–5th	Majority
228		Elizaldy Co	Ako Bicol	Party-list	Majority
229		Arthur Celeste	Nacionalista	Pangasinan–1st	Majority
230		Adrian Jay Advincula	NUP	Cavite–3rd	Majority
231		Bong Rivera	NPC	Tarlac–3rd	Majority
232		Christian Yap	Sama Sama Tarlac	Tarlac–2nd	Majority
233		Alfonso Umali Jr.	Liberal	Oriental Mindoro–2nd	Majority
234		Sonny Lagon	Ako Bisaya	Party-list	Majority
235		Jose Gay Padiernos	GP Party	Party-list	Majority
236		Richelle Singson-Michael	Ako Ilocano Ako	Party-list	Majority
237		Ron Salo	KABAYAN	Party-list	Majority
238		Caroline Tanchay	SAGIP	Party-list	Majority
239		Robert Raymond Estrella	Abono	Party-list	Majority
240		Edvic Yap	ACT-CIS	Party-list	Majority

==== Non-signatories ====
House of Representatives members who are members of some of the incumbent senators were noted to have not signed the petition. However, some members of the lower house were overseas and had their e-signatures sent but were not included in the copy endorsed to the Senate. Stephen Paduano of Abang Lingkod said that Dino Yulo and others did sign the complaint but their signatures were not included in the endorsed copy.

Members of the House of Representatives who did not sign the impeachment complaint against Vice President Sara Duterte
No.	Portrait	Representative	Party	District	Bloc
1		Cheeno Almario	Lakas	Davao Oriental–2nd	Majority
2		Jose Alvarez	NPC	Palawan–2nd	Majority
3		Pantaleon Alvarez	Reporma	Davao del Norte–1st	Minority
4		Eugenio Angelo Barba	Nacionalista	Ilocos Norte–2nd	Majority
5		Claudine Bautista-Lim	DUMPER PTDA	Party-list	Majority
6		Claude Bautista	NPC	Davao Occidental–Lone	Majority
7		Lianda Bolilia	Nacionalista	Batangas–4th	Majority
8		Bonifacio Bosita	1-Rider	Party-list	Minority
9		Luis Campos Jr.	NPC	Makati–2nd	Minority
10		Rudy Caoagdan	Nacionalista	Cotabato–2nd	Majority
11		Drixie Mae Cardema	Duterte Youth	Party-list	Majority
12		Dale Corvera	Lakas	Agusan del Norte–1st	Majority
13		Nelson Dayanghirang Sr.	Nacionalista	Davao Oriental–1st	Majority
14		Alfred delos Santos	Ang Probinsyano	Party-list	Majority
15		Jack Duavit	NPC	Rizal–1st	Majority
16		Alan Dujali	Lakas	Davao del Norte–2nd	Majority
17		Paolo Duterte	HTL	Davao City–1st	Majority
18		Ian Paul Dy	Lakas	Isabela–3rd	Majority
19		Dette Escudero	NPC	Sorsogon–1st	Majority
20		Rudys Caesar Fariñas	Probinsyano Ako	Party-list	Majority
21		Jose Arturo Garcia Jr.	NPC	Rizal–3rd	Majority
22		Pablo John Garcia	NUP	Cebu–3rd	Majority
23		Vincent Garcia	Lakas	Davao City–2nd	Majority
24		Anthony Rolando Golez Jr.	Malasakit@Bayanihan	Party-list	Majority
25		Richard Gomez	PFP	Leyte–4th	Majority
26		Ruwel Peter Gonzaga	PFP	Davao de Oro–2nd	Majority
27		Carlo Lisandro Gonzales	Marino	Party-list	Majority
28		Mujiv Hataman	Liberal (BUP)	Basilan–Lone	Minority
29		Bernadette Herrera	BH	Party-list	Minority
30		Virgilio Lacson	Manila Teachers	Party-list	Majority
31		Josephine Lacson-Noel	NPC	Malabon–Lone	Majority
32		Wilbert T. Lee	AGRI	Party-list	Minority
33		Antonio Legarda Jr.	NPC	Antique–Lone	Majority
34		Gloria Macapagal Arroyo	Lakas	Pampanga–2nd	Majority
35		Edward Maceda	NPC	Manila–4th	Majority
36		Rodante Marcoleta	SAGIP	Party-list	Majority
37		Eric Martinez	Independent	Valenzuela–2nd	Majority
38		Lani Mercado	Lakas	Cavite–2nd	Majority
39		Migs Nograles	PBA	Party-list	Majority
40		Khymer Adan Olaso	Nacionalista	Zamboanga City–1st	Majority
41		Rosemarie Panotes	Lakas	Camarines Norte–1st	Majority
42		Kid Peña	NPC	Makati–1st	Majority
43		Eduardo Rama Jr.	Lakas	Cebu City–2nd	Majority
44		Bryan Revilla	Agimat	Party-list	Majority
45		Jolo Revilla	Lakas	Cavite–1st	Majority
46		Rufus Rodriguez	CDP	Cagayan de Oro–2nd	Majority
47		Mikee Romero	1-PACMAN	Party-list	Majority
48		Joey Salceda	Lakas	Albay–2nd	Majority
49		Horacio Suansing Jr.	NUP	Sultan Kudarat–2nd	Majority
50		Reynaldo Tamayo	ANGAT	Party-list	Majority
51		Shernee Tan	Kusug Tausug	Party-list	Majority
52		Stephen James Tan	Nacionalista	Samar–1st	Minority
53		Reynolds Michael Tan	Lakas	Samar–2nd	Minority
54		Dino Tanjuatco	NPC	Rizal–2nd	Majority
55		Toby Tiangco	Navoteño	Navotas–Lone	Majority
56		Erwin Tulfo	ACT-CIS	Party-list	Majority
57		Isidro Ungab	HTL	Davao City–3rd	Majority
58		Lord Allan Velasco	NPC	Marinduque–Lone	Majority
59		Rosanna Vergara	PFP	Nueva Ecija–3rd	Majority
60		Sam Verzosa	Tutok To Win	Party-list	Majority
61		Eddie Villanueva	CIBAC	Party-list	Majority
62		Camille Villar	Nacionalista	Las Piñas–Lone	Majority
63		Brian Yamsuan	Bicol Saro	Party-list	Minority
64		Eric Yap	Lakas	Benguet–Lone	Majority
65		Maricar Zamora	Lakas	Davao de Oro–1st	Majority
66		Jose Maria Zubiri Jr.	PFP	Bukidnon–3rd	Majority

== Congressional recess (February–June 2025) ==
The Senate received the complaint from the House of Representatives on February 5, 2025, which also coincided with the last day of Senate session. The Articles of Impeachment were received by Senate secretary Renato Bantug at 5:49 p.m. but it was not reported to the plenary before it adjourned at 7:00 p.m. The Senate is obliged to convene as an impeachment court to process the complaint but there was no immediate schedule released.

Senate President Chiz Escudero maintained that the Senate cannot start the proceedings until after the Congress reconvene on June 2, 2025. He has set that the trial proper to be held on July 30, 2025. He further maintained that a trial cannot be "legally" started during this period since he believe that there has to be an ongoing session for the Senate to convene as an impeachment court.

Lawyer Catalino Generillo Jr. on February 14 filed a petition for mandamus, before the Supreme Court arguing that the Senate has the "inescapable constitutional duty" to immediately start the trial. On February 18, a group of Mindanao-based lawyers filed a certiorari and sought a temporary restraining order to prevent the start of the trial. On the same day, Sara Duterte also sent a petition to the Supreme Court asking for the nullification of the impeachment complaint.

Senator Ronald dela Rosa insisted he will remain "apolitical" while admitting his close ties to Duterte. When asked what is the implication of his participation in the National Rally for Peace in January 2025, Senator Robin Padilla committed to "definitely" vote "no" for Duterte's impeachment.

In case the verified complaint or resolution of impeachment is filed by at least one-third of all the Members of the House, the same shall constitute the Articles of Impeachment, and trial by the Senate shall forthwith proceed.

— 1987 Constitution of the Philippines; Article IX, Section 3(4)

Senate minority leader Koko Pimentel said that the course of the impeachment could be affected by the fact that the terms of 12 of the chamber's members are due to end on June 30, along with the results of the 2025 Philippine Senate election on May 12.

Assuming that the Senate convene on June 2, there are six session days left until the 19th Congress ends on June 13 which made Escudero conclude that the impeachment trial would be heard by the 20th Congress. Escudero projects the trial to begin in July 2025 after President Marcos makes his State of the Nation Address, with a verdict due in October 2025.

Nevertheless, proponents of the impeachment insist that the Constitution obligates that the "trial by the Senate shall proceed forthwith," or as soon as possible. They suggest that the President may call in a special session for this purpose. Pressure on the Senate persisted until at least June.

On May 29, Escudero made a motion to move the presentation of the articles of impeachment to June 11, the last session day of the 19th Congress.

On June 4, Dela Rosa admitted drafting a resolution seeking the "de facto dismissal" of the impeachment case.

== Convening of the Senate ==
=== June 9: Attempt to start the trial ===
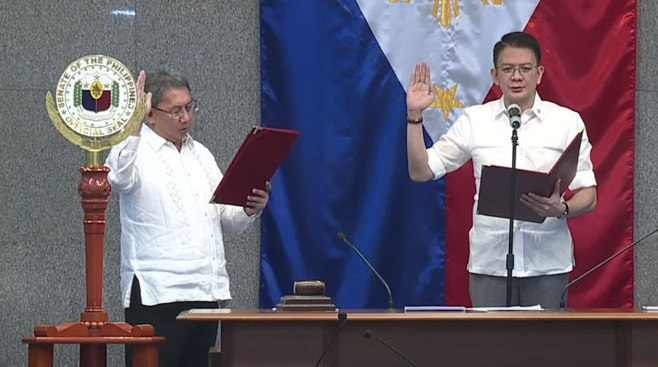
Senate President Francis Escudero takes his oath as presiding officer of the impeachment trial of Vice President Sara Duterte on June 9, 2025. The oathtaking was administered by Senate Secretary Renato Bantug Jr.

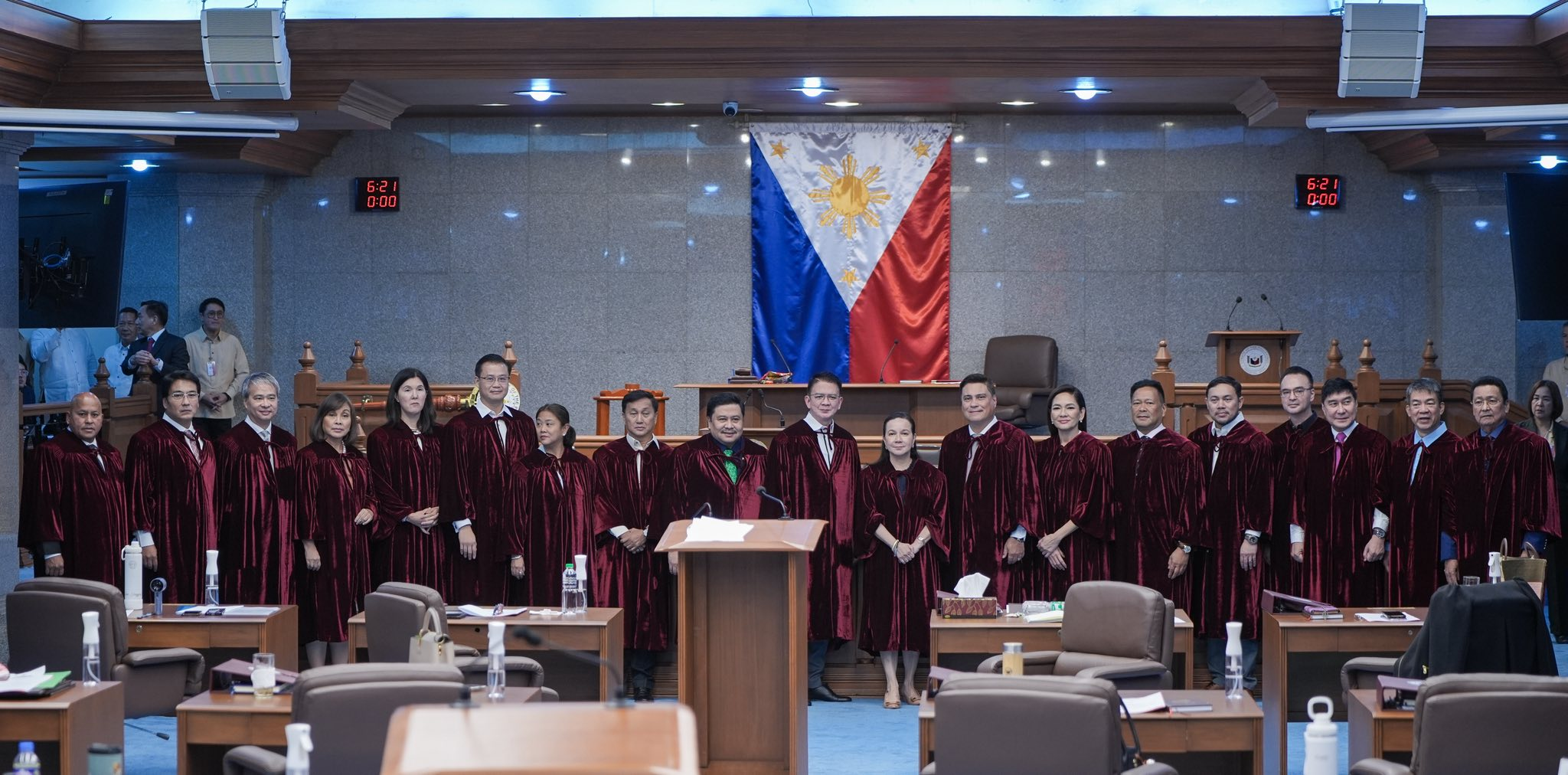
The Senator-Judges of the 19th Congress. From left to right: Senators Ronald Dela Rosa, Bong Revilla, Joel Villanueva, Loren Legarda, Pia Cayetano, Win Gatchalian, Nancy Binay, Francis Tolentino, Jinggoy Estrada, Francis Escudero, Grace Poe, Migz Zubiri, Risa Hontiveros, JV Ejercito, Mark Villar, Alan Peter Cayetano, Raffy Tulfo,Koko Pimentel, and Lito Lapid

On June 9, 2025, minority senators Risa Hontiveros and Koko Pimentel attempted to formally start the trial of vice president Duterte. Minority leader Pimentel raised the motion to commence the process with the following proposals were.

- The Senate suspend its legislative business
- The convening of the Senate as an impeachment court immediately instead of Wednesday (June 11)
- Senate President Chiz Escudero take his oath as presiding officer
- Escudero should administer the oath of senators present
- The impeachment court call the impeachment case against Vice President Duterte and come up with trial calendar
- The impeachment court ask prosecutors to read impeachment articles on Tuesday (June 10)
- The writ of summons be subsequently issued to Duterte.

This was followed by two hours of debate on technicalities, then additional two hours for suspension of proceedings. At around 5:42 p.m., Robin Padilla filed a resolution that sought to terminate the impeachment proceedings.

Escudero took his oath as proposed but it was agreed that the rest of the senators take their oaths by 4 p.m the next day. Hontiveros and Pimentel argues that the oath taking means that the trial has already convened but Ronald Dela Rosa disagrees leading to another suspension. The trial did not start on that day.

=== June 10: Remanding of the articles of impeachment ===
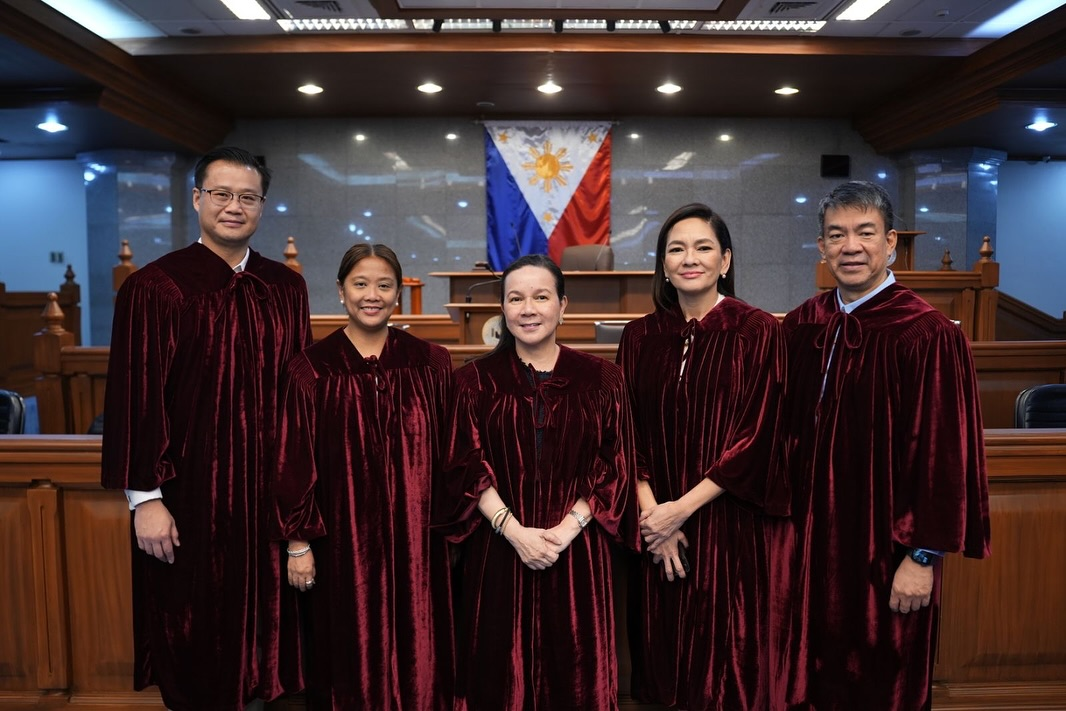
The five Senators who voted no to remand the articles of impeachment to the House.

Escudero administered the oath to the rest of the twenty-two senators. Dela Rosa made a motion to dismiss before and after the oath-taking, which the Senate did not take action on. Pimentel and Hontiveros urged their colleagues "cold neutrality", which meant that legal objections should be raised by the aggrieved party or Duterte herself.

Bong Go, during deliberations on Dela Rosa's motion, suggested returning the articles of impeachment to the House of Representatives. Dela Rosa also alleged that the House of Representatives was inactive over the three impeachment complaints filed in December 2023, preceding the current complaint. Cayetano modified Dela Rosa's motion, stating it should be returned to the lower house to certify the complaint did not violate the "one impeachment per year" clause.

However, the Senate voted on a motion by Alan Peter Cayetano not to dismiss or terminate the proceedings but to return the articles of impeachment to the House of Representatives. The motion obliges that:

- The House of Representatives certifies the non-violation of Article XI, Section 3, paragraph 5 of the Constitution, which provides that "No impeachment proceedings shall be initiated against the same official more than once within a period of one year"; including the circumstances on the filing of the first three impeachment complaints
- The House of Representatives of the 20th Congress communicates to the Senate that it is willing and ready to pursue the impeachment complaint against the Vice President.

Motion to remand the articles of impeachment to the House of Representatives (Senators of the 19th Congress)
Vote	No. of votes	Senators
Yes	18	A. Cayetano; P. Cayetano; Dela Rosa; Ejercito; Escudero; Estrada; Go; Lapid; Legarda; Marcos; Padilla; Revilla; Tolentino; Tulfo; Villanueva; C. Villar; M. Villar; Zubiri
No	5	Binay; Gatchalian; Hontiveros; Pimentel; Poe
Abstention	0	None

The writ of summons was issued to Duterte by Escudero, a move which was opposed by Dela Rosa. Sergeant-at-Arms Roberto Ancan was asked to deliver the document. The Office of the Vice President received the document at 11:05 am. on the following day. Duterte is asked to respond ten days from receipt.

== Response of the House ==
=== June 11: House certifies the impeachment complaint ===
The House of Representatives unanimously passed a resolution certifying the impeachment complaint's compliance with the constitution in response to the Senate remand. At the same time, it approved a motion deferring acceptance of the articles of impeachment until the Senate responds to the queries sought by the House prosecution panel regarding the remanding.

== Response of the defense ==
=== June 23: Answer Ad Cautelam to the House and reply to Senate summons ===
Vice President Duterte submitted an answer ad cautelam (Note: From ad abundantiorem cautelam, meaning "for more abundant caution") to the House of Representatives on June 23 at 3:53 p.m., as confirmed by House spokesperson Princess Abante, pleading for the dismissal of the impeachment case on the grounds that it "violated the one-year bar rule" of the Constitution. The same rationale was cited in a separate answer ad cautelam submitted to the Senate at 5:49 p.m. in response to the issuance of summons. Under the Senate impeachment rules, the House prosecutors have five days to file a reply; however, since June 28 falls on a Saturday, the prosecution panel is allowed to submit their reply until Monday, June 30. House prosecution spokesperson Antonio Bucoy announced the following day that the panel is ready to file their reply as early as Friday, June 27.

== Reply of the prosecution ==
=== June 27: House prosecution panel responds to the Vice President's Answer Ad Cautelam ===
The House prosecution panel responded to the arguments of Vice President Duterte in her answer ad cautelam filed before the impeachment court on June 27. Atty. Reginald Tongol confirmed that the court received the House's reply at 1:38 p.m., wherein the prosecution asked that the court deny the vice president's request to dismiss the impeachment case, emphasizing that the gravity of the charges demands a full trial and a final verdict of conviction. Several falsehoods were countered by the prosecutors on the defense's claims:

- The prosecution stated that the vice president acknowledged the receipt of the articles through an answer, refuting her claim that the court possesses no jurisdiction on the articles of impeachment after they were remanded to the House.
- The fourth impeachment complaint approved in February 2025 was the only one "initiated" by the House, not the previous three filed in December of the previous year, disproving the claim that it violated the Constitution's one-year bar rule.
- The defense was said to have modified a Supreme Court decision to favor their camp regarding the issue of whether the impeachment proceedings can carry over to the 20th Congress, with the prosecution pointing out that the said ruling provided that non-legislative functions are maintained even in transitions between congresses.
- The prosecution stated that all articles filed against the vice president are substantiated and based on facts and evidentiary matters, contrary to Duterte arguing otherwise.

== Cancelled impeachment trial ==
=== Senator-judges ===
16 out of the sitting 24 senators needed to vote Duterte to be liable in one of the impeachable offenses for her to be removed as vice president and be perpetually disqualified from holding any public office.

The terms of 12 senators in the 19th Congress expired on June 30, 2025. Had the Senate convened as a court in the 20th Congress, these lawmakers would not be able to take part unless they won a fresh mandate in the 2025 election. There have been arguments that the case could and could not crossover to the 20th Congress.

Keys

- A: Term ending on June 30, 2028 (incumbent)
- E: Term ending on June 30, 2025 (re-elected)
- O: Term ending on June 30, 2025 (re-election lost)
- X: Term ending on June 30, 2025 (term limited)
- N: Newly elected senator; assuming office on June 30, 2025.
- TBD: To be determined

Key
Italics	Outgoing senator from the 2025 general elections
Underline	Incoming senator from the 2025 general elections

19th Congress senators
Senator	Party	Bloc	Note				
Senator	Party	Bloc	Note	Alan Peter Cayetano	Independent	Independent	A
JV Ejercito	NPC	Independent	A				
Francis Escudero	NPC	Majority	A				
Jinggoy Estrada	PMP	Majority	A				
Win Gatchalian	NPC	Independent	A				
Risa Hontiveros	Akbayan	Minority	A				
Loren Legarda	NPC	Independent	A				
Robin Padilla	PDP	Majority	A				
Raffy Tulfo	Independent	Majority	A				
Joel Villanueva	Independent	Independent	A				
Mark Villar	Nacionalista	Majority	A				
Migz Zubiri	Independent	Independent	A				
Pia Cayetano	Nacionalista	Majority	E				
Ronald dela Rosa	PDP	Majority	E				
Bong Go	PDP	Majority	E				
Lito Lapid	NPC	Majority	E				
Imee Marcos	Nacionalista	Majority	E				
Bong Revilla	Lakas	Majority	O				
Francis Tolentino	PFP	Majority	O				
Nancy Binay	UNA	Independent	X				
Koko Pimentel	Nacionalista	Minority	X				
Grace Poe	Independent	Majority	X				
Cynthia Villar	Nacionalista	Majority	X				

20th Congress senators
Senator	Party	Bloc	Note				
Senator	Party	Bloc	Note	Alan Peter Cayetano	Independent	Majority	A
JV Ejercito	NPC	Majority	A				
Francis Escudero	NPC	Majority	A				
Jinggoy Estrada	PMP	Majority	A				
Win Gatchalian	NPC	Majority	A				
Risa Hontiveros	Akbayan	Minority	A				
Loren Legarda	NPC	Minority	A				
Robin Padilla	PDP	Majority	A				
Raffy Tulfo	Independent	Majority	A				
Joel Villanueva	Independent	Majority	A				
Mark Villar	Nacionalista	Majority	A				
Migz Zubiri	Independent	Minority	A				
Pia Cayetano	Nacionalista	Majority	E				
Ronald dela Rosa	PDP	Majority	E				
Bong Go	PDP	Majority	E				
Lito Lapid	NPC	Majority	E				
Imee Marcos	Nacionalista	Majority	E				
Bam Aquino	KNP	Majority	N				
Panfilo Lacson	Independent	Minority	N				
Rodante Marcoleta	Independent	Majority	N				
Francis Pangilinan	Liberal	Majority	N				
Tito Sotto	NPC	Minority	N				
Erwin Tulfo	Lakas	Majority	N				
Camille Villar	Nacionalista	Majority	N				

=== Legal teams ===
==== Prosecution ====
The House of Representatives named 11 of its members who will serve as prosecutors. They were to defend the lower house's motion to impeach Vice President Duterte before the Senate acting as the impeachment court. 4Ps Partylist representative and House Minority Leader Marcelino Libanan was named as the informal lead prosecutor. The House also received offers for legal assistance from third party lawyers. If a trial had started after the 19th Congress, prosecutors Loreto Acharon and Jil Bongalon would not return to the House after losing their seats in the 2025 House elections. Speaker Romualdez invited representatives-elect Leila de Lima and Chel Diokno to take their places if a trial resumed in the 20th Congress.

Key
Italics	Outgoing representative from the 2025 general elections
Underline	Incoming representative from the 2025 general elections

Prosecutors
Portrait	Representative	Party	District	Bloc
	Gerville Luistro	Lakas	Batangas–2nd	Majority
	Romeo Acop †	NUP	Antipolo–2nd	Majority †Died December 20, 2025
	Rodge Gutierrez	1-Rider	Party-list	Majority
	Joel Chua	Lakas	Manila–3rd	Majority
	Jil Bongalon	Ako Bicol	Party-list	Out of the 20th Congress
	Loreto Acharon	NPC	General Santos	Out of the 20th Congress
	Marcelino Libanan	4Ps	Party-list	Minority
	Arnan Panaligan	Lakas	Oriental Mindoro–1st	Majority
	Bel Zamora	Lakas	San Juan	Majority
	Lorenz Defensor	NUP	Iloilo–3rd	Majority
	Jonathan Keith Flores	Lakas	Bukidnon–2nd	Majority
	Leila de Lima	Mamamayang Liberal	Party-list	Minority
	Chel Diokno	Akbayan	Party-list	Minority

==== Spokesperson of the House Prosecution Panel ====
The prosecution has also named litigation lawyer Antonio Bucoy as their spokesperson.

==== Defense ====
According to Sara Duterte, her legal team had already begun preparations as early as November 2023 in anticipation of her impeachment. In December 2024, her father, former President Rodrigo Duterte, offered to join the defense team. On June 16, 2025, the Senate impeachment court, through the Secretary of the Senate acting as Clerk of Court, received the formal list of lawyers entering their appearance as counsel for the vice president. Through a press release, the court confirmed the Clerk's receipt of the Appearance Ad Cautelam from the law firm of Fortun Narvasa & Salazar, with sixteen undersigned lawyers:

1. Philip Sigfrid Fortun
2. Gregorio Narvasa II
3. Sheila Sison
4. Carlo Joaquin Narvasa
5. Roberto Batungbacal
6. Justin Nicol Gular
7. Lindon Miguel Bacquel
8. David Ronell Golla VII
9. Maria Selena Golda Fortun
10. Clarlaine Radoc
11. Francesca Marie Flores
12. Miguel Carlos Fernandez
13. Michael Wesley Poa
14. Reynold Munsayac
15. Mark Vinluan
16. Ralph Bodota

==== Spokesperson of the Defense ====
Duterte has named Michael Poa, her former spokesperson at the Office of the Vice President and the Department of Education, as the spokesperson for the defense, of which he is a member.

=== Postponement of the start of trial ===
The Senate impeachment court announced on June 25 that the commencement of trial proceedings would be postponed until the House prosecution panel was reconstituted in accordance with the composition of the incoming 20th Congress. Senate President Escudero clarified that since some members of the previous Congress lost their re-election bids while others are assuming different positions, a new prosecution panel must be formed. Preparations were also said to be continuing despite the further delay. Escudero was later said to have expressed that he aims to convene the court on July 29, a day after President Marcos's fourth State of the Nation Address.

== Constitutionality of the Articles of Impeachment ==
Supreme Court invalidates 2025 Impeachment Procedure

=== July 25: Nullification by the Supreme Court ===
The Supreme Court unanimously nullified the impeachment complaint on July 25, 2025, ruling that it was "unconstitutional". The Court stated that the "one year-bar rule" was already covered by the first three impeachment cases, rendering the fourth one invalid. No complaints can be filed before the House of Representatives until February 6, 2026, one year after the majority of the House voted in favor of the fourth complaint used to impeach the vice president.

Ruling whether the impeachment complaint against Vice President Duterte is unconstitutional (Justices of the Supreme Court)
Vote	No. of votes	Justices
Concurring	13	Dimaampao; Gaerlan; Gesmundo; Hernando; Inting; Kho; Lazaro-Javier; Leonen (Ponente); Lopez; Marquez; Rosario; Villanueva; Zalameda
Dissenting	0	None
Inhibited	2	Caguioa; Singh (Note: Associate Justice Singh was on leave.)

No trial before the Senate will be held as a result, as the chamber cannot acquire jurisdiction as per the court ruling.

==== Response ====
On the evening of the decision, Senator Joel Villanueva claimed the impeachment court will continue convening despite the decision of the Supreme Court. He cited precedence in the impeachment court's actions during the impeachment trial of Chief Justice Corona in 2011, where the Supreme Court issued a temporary restraining order, but the Senate voted to ultimately ignore it.

On August 4, 2025, the House of Representatives, via the Office of the Solicitor General as its counsel, appealed before the Supreme Court by filing a motion for reconsideration based on its ruling declaring the articles of impeachment unconstitutional, days before the provided 15-day deadline.

The Senate held a vote on August 6, in which it voted to transfer the articles of impeachment to its archives, after reviewing the court's 97-page decision. During the proceedings, several spectators who belonged to Akbayan made a thumbs down gesture before walking out after being approached by Senate staff.

Motion to transfer the articles of impeachment to the archives (Senators of the 20th Congress)
Vote	No. of votes	Senators
Yes	19	A. Cayetano; P. Cayetano; Dela Rosa; Ejercito; Escudero; Estrada; Gatchalian; Go; Lapid; Legarda; Marcoleta; Marcos; Padilla; E. Tulfo; R. Tulfo; Villanueva; C. Villar; M. Villar; Zubiri
No	4	Aquino; Hontiveros; Pangilinan; Sotto
Abstention	1	Lacson

Supreme Court denied the House of Representatives Motion for Reconsideration with finality.

== Aftermath ==
On January 28, 2026, the high court en banc dismissed the motion of reconsideration with finality. It also defined session days as a "mean a calendar day in which the House of Representatives holds a session" and does not mean legislative session days.

== Analysis ==
Antonio Soriano of the Citizens' Watch for Good Governance questioned the "shotgun" approach of the impeachment complaint. Soriano says that intent regarding Duterte's threat against the president has to be proven. He also believes that Duterte's action under the capacity of mayor of Davao City cannot be used for grounds for her impeachment and details of her alleged misused of confidential funds cannot be publicly disclosed. Soriano even speculated that the motions might even benefit a potential electoral bid of Duterte in the upcoming 2028 elections.

The impeachment procedure was seen gaining traction in the House of Representatives, but the same was not certain in the Senate, as a two-thirds supermajority of 16 out of 24 votes is needed to convict Duterte.

Ronald Llamas of the Galahad Consulting Agency, and political advisor of former president Benigno Aquino III, believes that delaying the impeachment proceedings to after the 2025 mid-term elections would render Marcos a lame-duck president. Llamas said that Marcos's earlier pronouncement to discourage impeachment proceedings can either be taken "at face value" or as a "tactical move" He previously said in August 2024 that formal impeachment proceedings were likely to begin before the 2025 election.

Following the election, Navotas representative Toby Tiangco, who served as campaign manager for Marcos's senatorial slate, Alyansa para sa Bagong Pilipinas, said that Alyansa's standings in Mindanao were adversely affected by the impeachment motion against Sara Duterte. Surigao del Norte representative Ace Barbers called the claim "misleading", noting that the majority of lawmakers in Mindanao who signed the impeachment complaint were reelected.

It is unclear if Duterte could have avoided disqualification by resigning before a conviction. Associate justice Antonio Carpio believes she could do so, while constitutional law professor and lawyer Antonio La Viña differs saying the trial may still proceed despite a potential resignation. While a resignation may prove to be moot and academic, the imposition of the disqualification from public office may still be done. Constitutional law expert Paolo Tamase has a similar opinion describing the issue "open question". Tamase cites the second impeachment of U.S. President Donald Trump in 2021 where the United States Senate still proceeded with the trial despite Trump already ending his first term. Tamase asserts that Article XI, Section 3(7) is based on the American constitution.

== Response ==
The Office of the President on December 3 distanced itself from the issue and reiterated its stance of discouraging any impeachment motion against Duterte, stating that it was the right of private citizens to make such moves. Senate President Francis Escudero had advised his colleagues not to make public pronouncements about the impeachment complaints.

The Iglesia ni Cristo (INC) on December 4 announced plans to hold a rally to oppose the impeachment efforts concurring with President Marcos's stance in November 2024 that efforts to remove Duterte from office is unconstructive. On January 13, 2025, more than 1.5 million INC members went to the "National Rally for Peace" at the Quirino Grandstand in Manila; 12 simultaneous rallies were also staged across the country. Among the politicians who attended the rally at the Quirino Grandstand were Manila mayor Honey Lacuna, former Manila mayor Isko Moreno, SAGIP Partylist representative Rodante Marcoleta, and Senators Francis Tolentino, Ronald dela Rosa, Bong Go and Robin Padilla. Bisaya Gyud Partylist first nominee Greco Belgica and senatorial aspirants Jimmy Bondoc and Phillip Salvador, all of whom are Partido Demokratiko Pilipino (PDP) members, also attended the rally with PDP committee heads Astra Pimentel-Naik and Penny Belmonte. Actress Vivian Velez, a PDP member who has expressed displeasure with Marcos's presidency, was among the rally's attendees, stating to SMNI's Newsblast that "I guess we will only have peace if president Marcos steps down".

After the impeachment motion was passed in the House of Representatives, Sara Duterte said in an address that being rejected by a romantic partner was worse than the impeachment itself, while uttering "God save the Philippines". On May 16, shortly after the 2025 election, Duterte said she would "truly want a trial" desiring for a "bloodbath".

Should Duterte be convicted, Marcos would select among the qualified members of the House of Representatives and Senate to fill the vacancy. She would also be ineligible to run for any public position in future elections, including the presidency.

== Opinion polling ==
Public opinion polls of impeachment
Polling body	Sample size	Margin of error	Support	Oppose	Undecided	Don't know	Date	Notes	Citation
SWS	2,160	±2%	41%	35%	19%	5%	Dec 12–18, 2024	Agreement on the impeachment complaint	
WR Numero	1,814	±2%	33%	47%	19%	—N/a	Feb 10–18, 2025	On the impeachment of Sara Duterte	
CSI	2,000 (students only)	—N/a	84.8%	12.2%	3.1%	—N/a	Feb 28–Mar 16, 2025	Should Sara Duterte be impeached?	
CSI	2,000 (students only)	—N/a	73%	19.8%	6.4%	—N/a	Feb 28–Mar 16, 2025	Should the Senate convene as a trial court?	
OCTA	1,200	±2%	78%	13%	9%		Apr 20–24, 2025	Should Sara Duterte face the impeachment trial to clear her name?	

== See also ==
- Efforts to impeach Bongbong Marcos
- Efforts to impeach Rodrigo Duterte
- Trial of Joseph Estrada
- Impeachment of Renato Corona
- Impeachment of Merceditas Gutierrez
- People Power Revolution
