= Sara Duterte confidential funds controversy =

Allegations regarding the use of confidential funds by Sara Duterte

Sara Duterte, the 15th and current vice president of the Philippines, has faced allegations regarding the use of confidential funds allocated to the Office of the Vice President (OVP) and the Department of Education (DepEd) during her tenure as Secretary of Education.

== Background ==
=== Sara Duterte ===
Sara Duterte is the vice president of the Philippines under Bongbong Marcos. Duterte was appointed as the Secretary of Education, serving from June 30, 2022, until her resignation on July 19, 2024. She cited the government's alleged "mishandling" of the national budget for DepEd as among the reasons for her resignation. As vice president, Duterte heads the Office of the Vice President (OVP).

=== Confidential funds ===
Confidential and intelligence funds are part of the national budget and are intended for activities that cannot be publicly disclosed, including surveillance and intelligence operations. Their allocation and use have been subject to scrutiny, particularly when assigned to civilian agencies.

As per Joint Circular No. 2015-01, the two funds involve:

- Confidential expenses – related to surveillance activities in civilian government agencies supporting their mandate or operations.
- Intelligence expenses – related to intelligence-gathering activities of uniformed personnel and other practitioners with direct impact on national security.

For 2024, Congress removed confidential funds from the Department of Education and the OVP.

Confidential funds under Sara Duterte
| Office | Funds received | | |
| Office | 2022 | 2023 | 2024 |
|---|---|---|---|
| Department of Education | —N/a | ₱112.5 million | ₱0 |
| Office of the Vice President | ₱125 million (Note: From the ₱221.424 million requested by the OVP and approved by the Office of the President.) | ₱500 million | ~~₱500 million~~ ₱0 |
| Total | — | ₱125 million | ₱0 |

=== Allegations ===
The allocation for the OVP has received scrutiny since 2023 during deliberations for the 2024 national budget. The Commission on Audit (COA) reported in 2023 that ₱112 million in confidential funds was spent within 11 days, raising concerns among lawmakers in the House of Representatives.

In 2025, groups filed a plunder complaint alleging that Duterte had misused ₱612.5 million in confidential funds, including ₱500 million from the OVP and ₱112.5 million from DepEd.

Reports also highlighted acknowledgment receipts containing names such as "Mary Grace Piattos", which were cited by lawmakers and media outlets as part of allegations of irregularities in the use of confidential funds.

Duterte has declined to provide further details on these names, stating that doing so could compromise intelligence-related operations.

== Actions ==
=== Impeachment ===
An impeachment complaint, the second out of eventually four complaints, was filed against Sara Duterte on December 19, 2024. The House of Representatives eventually impeached Sara Duterte on February 5, 2026 transmitting the fourth impeachment complaint to the Senate. The second articles of impeachment cites her alleged misuse of OVP and DepEd confidential funds citing ₱254.9 million of "ghost expenses". Duterte was not removed as vice president as the trial was shortly aborted after the Senate convened as a trial court in June 2025 and remand the articles of impeachment back to the lower house. The Supreme Court ruled in July 2025 that the impeachment complaint as unconstitutional for violating the "one year-bar rule" which was triggerred by the first three impeachment cases.

The renewed efforts to impeach Sara Duterte again for the second time in 2026 after the lapse of the one year-bar provision. The complaints also included the confidential funds issue as basis to remove her from office.

=== Plunder and graft complaint ===
Apart from the impeachment complaints, Duterte has faced a criminal lawsuit over her confidential funds issue. In December 2025, plunder and graft charges were filed against Duterte and 15 others before the Ombudsman. This also covers her alleged misuse of confidential funds. The complainants were accompanied by former finance secretary Cielo Magno, as well as Catholic priests Flavie Villanueva and Robert Reyes. In January 2026, former senator Sonny Trillanes and the group The Silent Majority (TSM) filed another complaint against Duterte.
