= Efforts to impeach Bongbong Marcos =

- Accused: Bongbong Marcos, 17th President of the Philippines
- Date: January 19, 2026 – February 10, 2026 (3 weeks and 1 day)
- Charges: Graft and corruption; Culpable violation of the Constitution; Betrayal of public trust

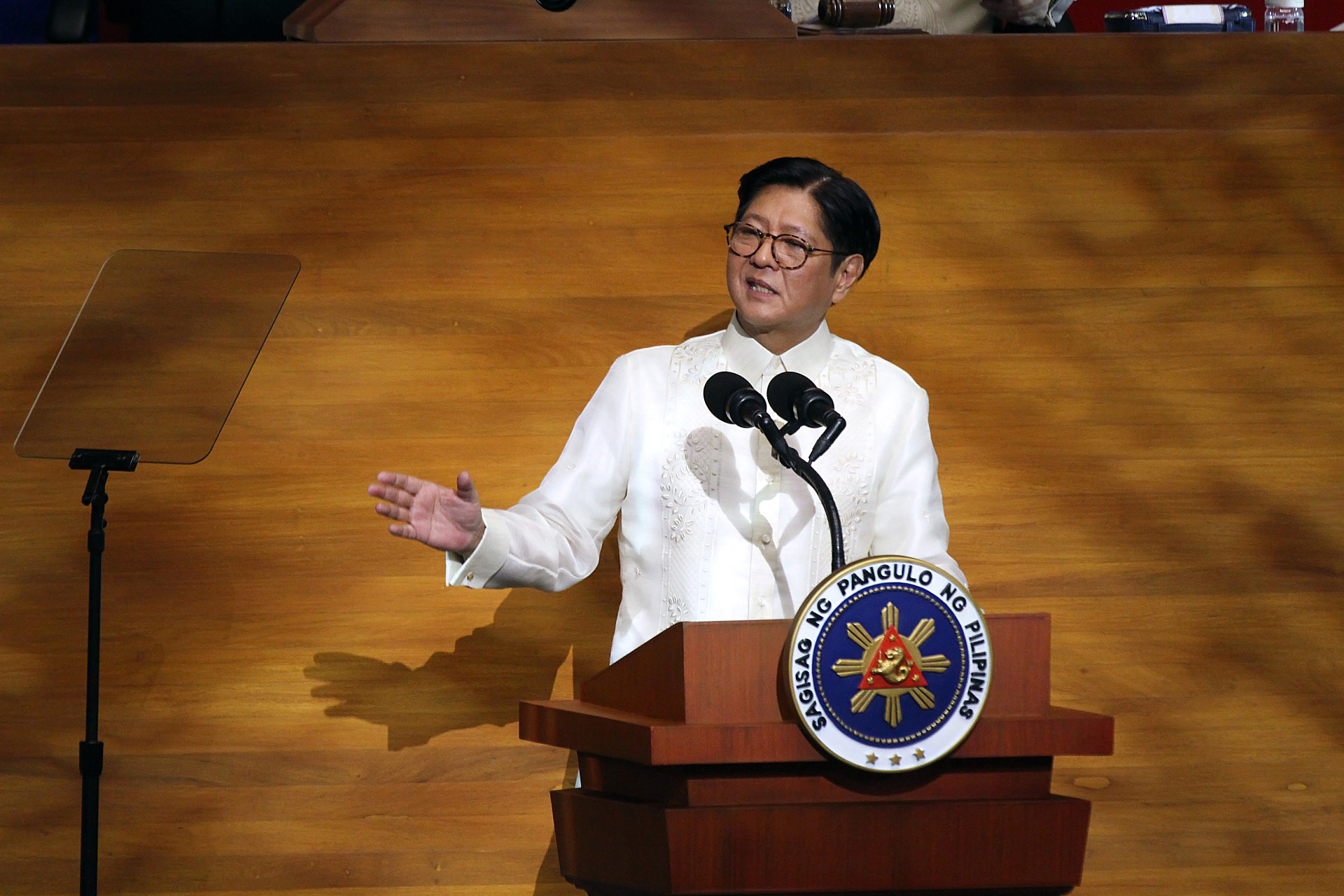
Bongbong Marcos delivering his fourth State of the Nation Address on July 28, 2025

During his presidency, Bongbong Marcos, the 17th and current president of the Philippines, saw multiple efforts in 2026 seeking to remove him from office through impeachment. Three separate complaints were filed with the House of Representatives in January 2026.

== Complaints ==
=== First impeachment complaint ===
On January 19, 2026, the first impeachment complaint against Marcos was filed by lawyer Andre de Jesus on the grounds of graft and corruption, culpable violation of the Constitution, and betrayal of public trust. It was endorsed by Pusong Pinoy party-list representative Jernie Jett Nisay, and was officially received by House secretary general Cheloy Garafil on the same day.

The reasoning includes Marcos ordering and allowing the arrest of former President Rodrigo Duterte to face charges at the International Criminal Court, allegedly for being a drug addict, and failure to veto unconstitutional provisions of the national budget for 2023 to 2026.

The Committee on Justice on February 4, 2026, found the first impeachment complaint "insufficient in substance". 42 legislators voted to dismiss the complaint with only Nisay voting the complaint as having sufficient substance. Three Makabayan bloc lawmakers abstained.

=== Second impeachment complaint ===
Two separate complaints were filed on January 22, 2026, before the House secretariat by the Makabayan bloc. The complaint was not received on that date due to the inavailibility of House secretary Garafil. The bloc alleged "betrayal of public trust" over the Marcos administration' adoption of the Baselined-Balanced-Managed (BBM) Parametric Formula in allocating infrastructure projects which allegedly led to ghost, substandard, and overpriced flood control projects.

The Committee on Justice on February 4, 2026, also found the first impeachment complaint "insufficient in substance", 39 legislators voted to dismiss the complaint while 7 voted in support of the measure.

=== Third impeachment complaint ===
Allies of former president Rodrigo Duterte filed a third complaint on January 22, 2026. The complaint, along with that filed by the Makabayan bloc, was not received by the secretariat. The third complaint had similar grievances with the first.

In addition to the Duterte ICC arrest, alleged illegal drug use and non-veto of the national budget, the complaint also condemns Marcos for not choosing to veto the Ayuda para sa Kapos ang Kita (AKAP) Program, allegedly receiving billions in kickbacks as per the claims of Zaldy Co, importation of 440,000 metric tons of sugar in 2023, renewing the Malampaya contract for another 15 years in 2023, and allegedly being aware of the corruption of cousin and former House speaker Martin Romualdez.

=== Final voting ===
On February 9, 2026, the House of Representatives approved to dismiss the impeachment complaints against President Marcos filed by Andre de Jesus, and former Alliance of Concerned Teachers representative France Castro and Bayan Muna chairperson Neri Colmenares, respectively, with a vote of 42-1-3 and 39–4. House Resolution 746 was adopted the following day with 284 votes in favor, eight against, and four abstentions which effectively ended the impeachment process.

== See also ==
- First impeachment of Sara Duterte
- Second impeachment of Sara Duterte
