= Efforts to impeach Rodrigo Duterte =

2017–2019 Philippine efforts to charge president

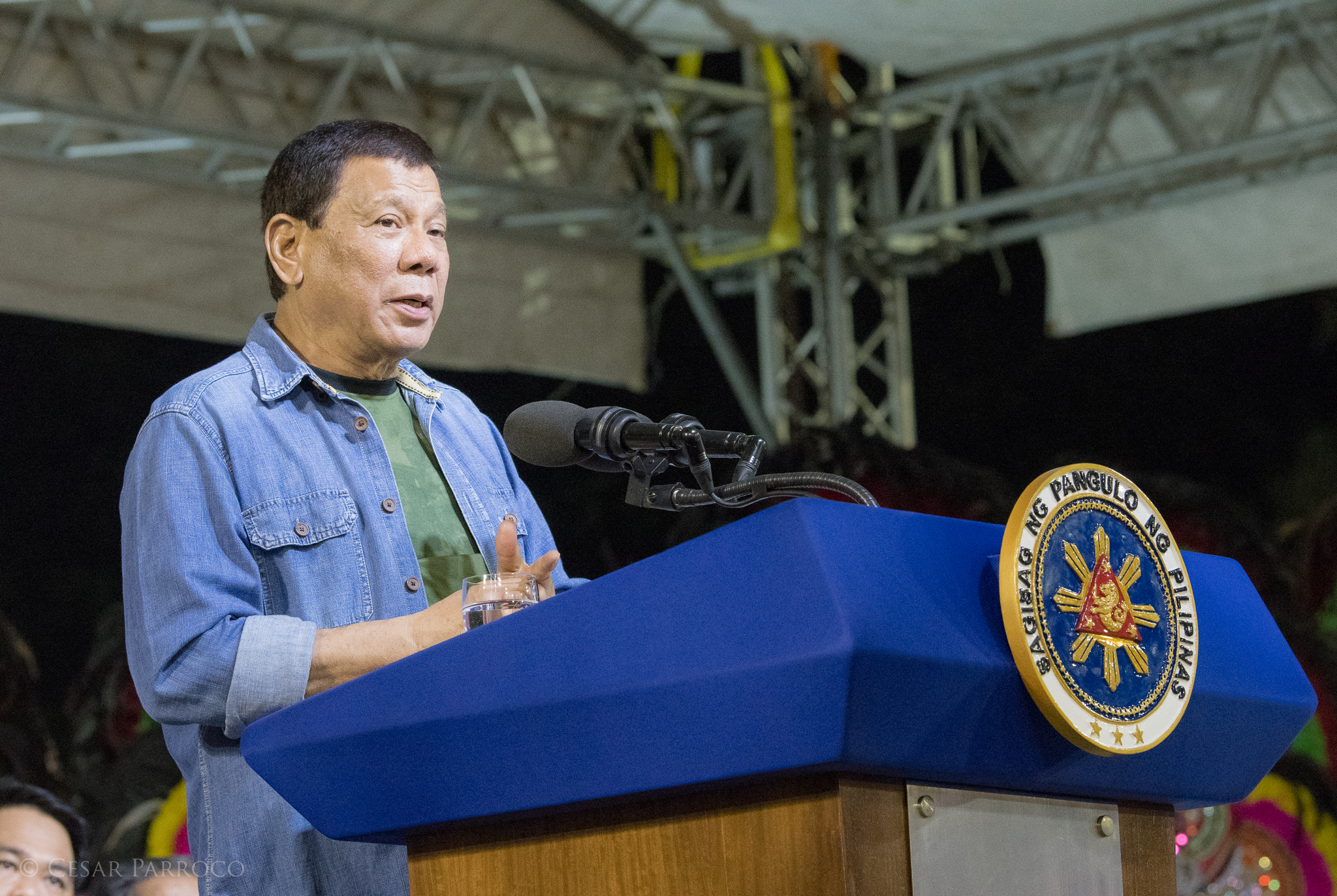
Duterte in 2017

Efforts to impeach Rodrigo Duterte began in March 2017 when several opposition figures filed an impeachment complaint against Philippine President Rodrigo Duterte for his role in the war on drugs and other issues.

== War on drugs ==
On March 16, 2017, Gary Alejano, an opposition lawmaker, filed an impeachment complaint against Philippine President Rodrigo Duterte, citing thousands of deaths in his crackdown on drug abuse and alleged corruption. The House Justice Committee officially threw out the charge by unanimous vote.

== South China Sea dispute ==
Later, Alejano added changes about his relations with China, saying: "He utterly failed and/or refused to assert the country's exclusive sovereign rights and maritime rights and territorial claims over Benham Rise and Panatag (Scarborough) Shoal and the rest of the West Philippine Sea (the government's designation for portions of the South China Sea)."

In response to the allegations, Duterte sent the Philippine Navy to occupy several "disputed" islands.

In May 2018, former Solicitor General Florin Hilbay asserted that Duterte may be impeached if he fails to protect the country's territory in the South China Sea. This comment followed reports that the Chinese Army had installed anti-ship and air-to-air defenses on outposts also claimed by Vietnam and the Philippines over the previous last 30 days. Duterte has been under harsh criticism for its ineffectual policy of appeasement with the Chinese government.

In response, Duterte claimed to the press that Chinese Communist Party leader Xi Jinping swore to protect him from moves that will result in his removal from office. "The assurances of Xi Jinping were very encouraging...'We will not allow you to be taken out from your office, and we will not allow the Philippines to go to the dogs,'" Duterte said.

In July 2018, former Solicitor General Hilbay further explained that, in his legal opinion, Duterte's inaction may cause the Philippines to lose their legal claim due to the waiver doctrine. Such conduct would constitute a betrayal of public trust, is ground for impeachment: "I'd say it's a culpable violation of the Constitution," Hilbay said. "There's no doubt in my mind as a constitutionalist, as the agent who served as counsel for the Republic, that these are clear betrayals of public trust."

Following an incident at the Reed Bank in June 2019 wherein the F/B Gem-Ver, a boat carrying 22 Filipino fishermen sank after being rammed by a Chinese vessel, the wife of its captain opined that she was in favor of impeaching Duterte for continuing to allow Chinese boats to fish in the area. Similarly, fisherfolk group Pamalakaya also filed an impeachment case against Duterte.

== Others ==
On 21 June 2019, Rhema International Livelihood Foundation, an alleged donor of Kapa Community Ministry International which was involved in an Ponzi scheme, petitioned the Supreme Court to have Duterte submitted for impeachment proceedings in relation to his actions involving the shutting down of Kapa Community Ministry International. In addition, the petition urged the removal from office of Securities and Exchange Commission (SEC) Chairman Emilio Aquino.

== See also ==
- Alleged ouster plots against Rodrigo Duterte
- Efforts to impeach Gloria Macapagal Arroyo
- First and second impeachment of Sara Duterte
