= Rudy Caoagdan =

Filipino politician

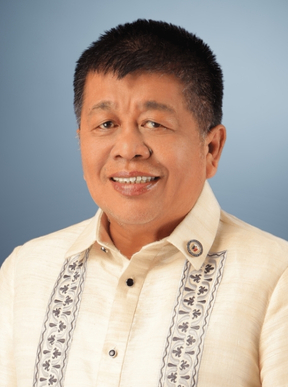
- Official portrait, 2025

Member of the Philippine House of Representatives from the Cotabato's 2nd congressional district
- Incumbent
- Assumed office June 30, 2019
- Preceded by: Nancy Catamco

Mayor of Makilala
- In office June 30, 2010 – June 30, 2019

Personal details
- Born: Rudy Santos Caoagdan; June 5, 1962 (age 64) Makilala, Cotabato, Philippines
- Party: Nacionalista (2018–present)
- Other political affiliations: Liberal (2015–2018); Independent (2012–2015); Lakas (2009–2012)
- Education: Lyceum Northwestern University (PhD, Public Administration); Notre Dame University (Masters, Public Administration); Notre Dame of Kidapawan College (BS Agri-Business); University of Southern Mindanao (Secondary); Central Mindanao College (Primary)
- Occupation: Politician
- Profession: Politician, military officer
- Nickname: Rudy

Military service
- Rank: Lieutenant Colonel, AFP Reserve Force

Rudy Santos Caoagdan (born June 5, 1962) is a Filipino politician serving as the Representative of Cotabato's 2nd congressional district since 2019. He was previously the Mayor of Makilala, Cotabato from 2010 to 2013.

== Early life and education ==
Caoagdan was born on June 5, 1962, in Makilala, Cotabato. He completed his primary education at Central Mindanao College and secondary education at the University of Southern Mindanao. He earned a degree in BS Agri-Business from Notre Dame of Kidapawan College, a Master’s in Public Administration from Notre Dame University, and later a Doctor of Public Administration from Lyceum Northwestern University.

== Political career ==
=== Mayor of Makilala (2010–2013) ===
Caoagdan served as Mayor of Makilala from 2010 to 2013. His term included efforts to mediate local conflicts, although in 2011 he was accused by the Moro Islamic Liberation Front (MILF) of harassing Muslim residents in Sitio Lacube, Tulunan. Caoagdan denied the accusations, stating he was misinterpreted while investigating reports of armed men in the area. Then-Governor Emmylou Taliño-Mendoza defended him, noting his role as mediator.

=== House of Representatives (2019–present) ===
In 2019, Caoagdan was elected as the Representative of the 2nd District of North Cotabato, succeeding Nancy Catamco. He was re-elected in 2022 and again in 2025. In Congress, he has served on several committees and has been active in legislation related to Mindanao development, agriculture, and local governance.

== Military career ==
Outside politics, Caoagdan is a member of the Armed Forces of the Philippines Reserve Force with the rank of Lieutenant Colonel. He also previously served as a Battalion Commander in the Philippine Army.
