= Dean Asistio =

Filipino politician

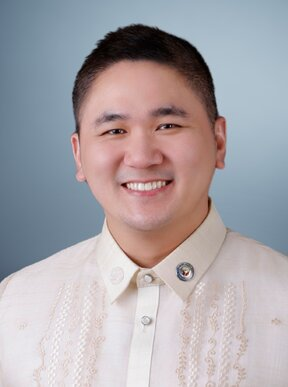
- Official portrait, 2026

Member of the Philippine House of Representatives from Caloocan's 3rd District
- Incumbent
- Assumed office June 30, 2022
- Preceded by: District created

Member of the Caloocan City Council from the 1st District
- In office June 30, 2013 – June 30, 2022

Personal details
- Born: Dean Asistio; August 28, 1989 (age 37) Santa Cruz, Manila, Philippines
- Party: NUP (2026–present)
- Other political affiliations: Lakas (2022–2026); PDP–Laban (2018–2022); UNA (2012–2018)

Dean Asistio (born August 28, 1989) is a Filipino politician serving as the representative of Caloocan's 3rd congressional district since 2022. He was the first to represent the newly created district. He previously served three consecutive terms as a councilor of Caloocan from 2013 to 2022.

== Political career ==
=== Local government ===
Before entering Congress, Asistio served as a city councilor of Caloocan for three terms, from 2013 to 2022.

=== House of Representatives ===
In 2022, Asistio was elected as the first representative of the newly created 3rd district of Caloocan, defeating former Mayor Recom Echiverri. He was re-elected unopposed in 2025. In 20th Congress, he became chairperson of the House Committee on Metro Manila Development.

Asistio proposed the concept of "Pera sa Basura" ("money from trash"), encouraging local government units in Metro Manila to monetize garbage collection by buying recyclables from residents, especially in flood-prone communities.
