= Richelle Singson-Michael =

Filipino politician (born 1981)

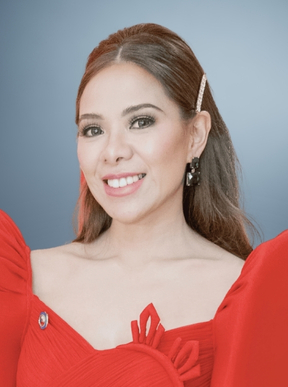
- Official portrait, 2025

Member of the Philippine House of Representatives for Ako Ilocano Ako
- Incumbent
- Assumed office June 30, 2022

Personal details
- Born: November 10, 1981 (age 44) San Juan, Metro Manila, Philippines
- Spouse: Richard Peter Michael (m. 2010)
- Children: Richard Lucas Michael • Ralph Laker Michael
- Parent: Chavit Singson (father)
- Occupation: Politician, businesswoman
- Profession: Architect

Richelle Raia Louise Antonio Singson-Michael (born November 10, 1981) is a Filipino politician and businesswoman who served as a representative for the Ako Ilocano Ako Partylist in the House of Representatives.

== Early life ==
Richelle Raia Louise Singson was born on November 10, 1981, in San Juan, Metro Manila, to Agnes and Chavit Singson. She is eighth among Chavit's children. Singson-Michael attended the International School Manila and graduated from the University of the Philippines Diliman where she obtained her architecture degree.

== Political career ==
The Ako Ilocano Ako partylist won a seat at the House of Representatives via the 2022 election. This was filled by Singson-Michael. She was Ako Ilocano Ako's first nominee, with her cousin Allen and brother Christian being the second and third nominees respectively.

== Other ==
She is an architect and heads the R.S. Michael Architecture firm and the CEO of the Platinum Skies Aviation charter airline.

Singson-Michael was also the chairperson of the Miss Universe Host Committee that organized the Miss Universe 2016 pageant in the Philippines.

== Personal life ==
Singson-Michael married Richard Peter Michael in 2010. She is a resident of Narvacan.
