= Defeat COVID-19 Ad Hoc Committee =

Ad hoc committee of the House of Representatives of the Philippines

- 18th Congress of the Philippines

History
- New session started: July 22, 2019

Leadership
- Chairperson: Alan Peter Cayetano (Nacionalista) since 2020
- Co-Chairperson: Ferdinand Martin Romualdez (Lakas) since 2020

Website
- Defeat COVID-19 Ad Hoc Committee

The Defeat COVID-19 Ad Hoc Committee is an ad hoc committee of the Philippine House of Representatives. The committee is dedicated to addressing matters directly and principally related to the government's appropriate response to the novel coronavirus. Its focus extends to mitigating the virus's impact on the economy and the general public, with particular attention to the labor force.

== Background ==
The ad hoc committee was first proposed on March 16, 2020 by Speaker Alan Peter Cayetano serving as an advisory and coordinating committee which will harmonize and streamline the government efforts in response to the pandemic.

On March 24, 2020, its creation was formally proposed by Cayetano during the approval on the third and final reading of House Bill No. 6616 which would later become the Bayanihan to Heal as One Act (Republic Act No. 11469). Majority Floor Leader Ferdinand Martin Romualdez then moved to select Cayetano as the committee chairperson of which the latter accepted. Cayetano likewise appointed Romualdez as a committee co-chairperson.

== Jurisdiction ==
The committee's jurisdiction is on the appropriate government response on the COVID-19 pandemic and how to curb its effects on the economy and the general public especially the labor force.

== Members and sub-committees ==
Position	Members	Party	Province/City	District
Chairperson	Alan Peter Cayetano	Nacionalista	Taguig–Pateros	1st
Co-Chairperson	Ferdinand Martin Romualdez	Lakas	Leyte	1st
New Normal Sub-Committee
Co-Chairperson	Loren Legarda	NPC	Antique	Lone
Health and COVID-19 Response Sub-Committee
Co-Chairpersons	Angelina Tan	NPC	Quezon	4th
Co-Chairpersons	Janette Garin	Nacionalista	Iloilo	1st
Social Amelioration Sub-Committee
Co-Chairpersons	Luis Raymund Villafuerte Jr.	Nacionalista	Camarines Sur	2nd
Co-Chairpersons	Lucy Torres-Gomez	PDP–Laban	Leyte	4th
Economic Stimulus Response Package Sub-Committee
Co-Chairpersons	Joey Salceda	PDP–Laban	Albay	2nd
Co-Chairpersons	Sharon Garin	AAMBIS-OWA	Party-list	
Co-Chairpersons	Stella Luz Quimbo	Liberal	Marikina	2nd
Peace and Order Sub-Committee
Co-Chairpersons	Raul Tupas	Nacionalista	Iloilo	5th
Co-Chairpersons	Narciso Bravo Jr.	NUP	Masbate	1st

=== New Normal Sub-Committee ===
The New Normal Sub-Committee is composed of the following existing House committees:

- Micro, Small and Medium Enterprise Development
- Disaster Management
- Higher and Technical Education
- Trade and Industry
- Transportation
- Basic Education and Culture
- Labor and Employment
- Government Reorganization
- Public Information
- Local Government
- Civil Service and Professional Regulation
- Good Government and Public Accountability
- Revision of Laws
- Information and Communications Technology
- Inter-Parliamentary Relations and Diplomacy
- Foreign Affairs
- Appropriations

=== Health and COVID-19 Response Sub-Committee ===
The Health and COVID-19 Response Sub-Committee is composed of the following existing House committees:

- Health
- Science and Technology

=== Social Amelioration Sub-Committee ===
The Social Amelioration Sub-Committee is composed of the following existing House committees:

- Agrarian Reform
- Agriculture and Food
- Aquaculture and Fisheries Resources
- Cooperatives Development
- Natural Resources
- Rural Development
- Veterans Affairs and Welfare
- Overseas Workers Affairs
- Poverty Alleviation
- Social Services
- Welfare of Children
- Women and Gender Equality
- Youth and Sports Development
- People Participation
- Food Security
- Land Use
- Persons with Disabilities
- Senior Citizens

=== Economic Stimulus Response Package Sub-Committee ===
The Economic Stimulus Response Package Sub-Committee is composed of the following existing House committees:

- Economic Affairs
- Public Works and Highways
- Government Enterprises and Privatization
- Sustainable Development Goals
- Metro Manila Development
- Games and Amusements
- Ways and Means
- Climate Change
- Visayas Development
- Tourism
- Energy
- Banks and Financial Intermediaries
- Flagship Programs and Projects
- Globalization and WTO
- Southern Tagalog Development
- Bicol Recovery and Economic Development
- North Luzon Growth Quadrangle
- Bases Conversion
- Reforestation
- East ASEAN Growth Area

=== Peace and Order Sub-Committee ===
The Peace and Order Sub-Committee is composed of the following existing House committees:

- Accounts
- National Defense and Security
- Public Order and Safety
- Ecology
- Housing and Urban Development
- Population and Family Relations
- Constitutional Amendments
- Ethics and Privileges
- Justice
- Legislative Franchises
- Public Accounts
- Suffrage and Electoral Reforms
- Dangerous Drugs
- Human Rights
- Mindanao Affairs
- Muslim Affairs
- Indigenous Cultural Communities and Indigenous Peoples
- Peace, Reconciliation and Unity
- Strategic Intelligence
- West Philippine Sea

== Approved bills ==
The following bills have been referred to the committee and already approved by the House of Representatives on the third and final reading:

House Bill	Short title	Long title	Date approved	Refs.
House Bill No. 6815	Accelerated Recovery and Investments Stimulus for the Economy of the Philippines (ARISE) Act (Note: Prior to its consolidation and approval, the bill was formerly called as the "Philippine Economic Stimulus Act")	An Act establishing an economic stimulus strategy for the country's growth and development in the aftermath of COVID-19, providing funds therefor	June 4, 2020	
House Bill No. 6816	Financial Institutions Strategic Transfer (FIST) Act	An Act ensuring Philippine financial industry resiliency against the COVID-19 pandemic	June 2, 2020	
House Bill No. 6817	COVID-19-Related Anti-Discrimination Act	An Act prohibiting the discrimination against person who are declared confirmed, suspect, probable, and recovered cases of COVID-19, repatriated Filipinos, healthcare workers, responders, and service workers and providing penalties for violation thereof	June 2, 2020	
House Bill No. 6864	Better Normal for the Workplace, Communities and Public Spaces Act	An Act establishing policies, regulations, and public health safeguards for the better normal in the workplace, public places and communities toward a sustainable recovery from COVID-19 pandemic	August 10, 2020	
House Bill No. 6865	Crushing COVID-19 Act	An Act mandating the conduct of baseline polymerase chain reaction COVID-19 testing for the vulnerable members of the society to stop the transmission of the disease	June 4, 2020	
House Bill No. 6920	COVID-19 Unemployment Reduction Economic Stimulus (CURES) Act	An Act establishing a COVID-19 unemployment reduction economic stimulus (CURES) fund, instituting mechanisms for the implementation thereof and appropriating funds therefor	June 5, 2020	

== See also ==
- House of Representatives of the Philippines
- List of Philippine House of Representatives committees
- COVID-19 pandemic in the Philippines
- Bayanihan to Heal as One Act
- Bayanihan to Recover as One Act
