= 19th Congress of the Philippines =

40th legislative term of the Philippines

←	18th	20th	→
- GSIS Building (2010) (top) and Batasang Pambansa Complex (2010) (bottom)

Overview
- Term: July 25, 2022 – June 11, 2025
- President: Bongbong Marcos
- Vice President: Sara Duterte

Senate
- Members: 24
- President: Juan Miguel Zubiri (until May 20, 2024); Francis Escudero (from May 20, 2024)
- President pro tempore: Loren Legarda (until May 20, 2024); Jinggoy Estrada (from May 20, 2024)
- Majority leader: Joel Villanueva (until May 20, 2024); Francis Tolentino (from May 20, 2024)
- Minority leader: Koko Pimentel

House of Representatives
- Members: 313
- Speaker: Martin Romualdez
- Senior Deputy Speaker: Gloria Macapagal Arroyo (until May 17, 2023); Aurelio Gonzales Jr. (from May 17, 2023)
- Deputy Speakers: Raymond Mendoza; Roberto Puno; Kristine Singson-Meehan; Isidro Ungab (until November 7, 2023); Camille Villar; Ralph Recto (July 27, 2022 – January 12, 2024); Aurelio Gonzales Jr. (July 27, 2022 – May 17, 2023); Duke Frasco (from July 27, 2022); Gloria Macapagal Arroyo (May 17 – November 7, 2023); Tonypet Albano (from November 7, 2023); Yasser Balindong (from November 7, 2023); David C. Suarez (from January 22, 2024)
- Majority Leader: Mannix Dalipe
- Minority Leader: Marcelino Libanan (from July 26, 2022)

The 19th Congress of the Philippines (Filipino: Ikalabinsiyam na Kongreso ng Pilipinas), composed of the Philippine Senate and House of Representatives, met from July 25, 2022, until June 11, 2025, during the first three years of Bongbong Marcos's presidency. The convening of the 19th Congress followed the 2022 general elections, which replaced half of the Senate membership and the entire membership of the House of Representatives.The House of Representatives consisted of 313 members elected from legislative districts and through the party-list system, which under Philippine law is intended to broaden representation by enabling national, regional, and sectoral organizations, including marginalized and underrepresented sectors, to participate in the legislative process.

The House of Representatives met in the Batasang Pambansa Complex. The Senate met in the GSIS Building, with a scheduled move to its new building in Taguig indefinitely postponed. The 19th Congress was also the first since the 10th Congress that no senator was from the Liberal Party.

== Leadership ==
=== Senate ===
Senate President

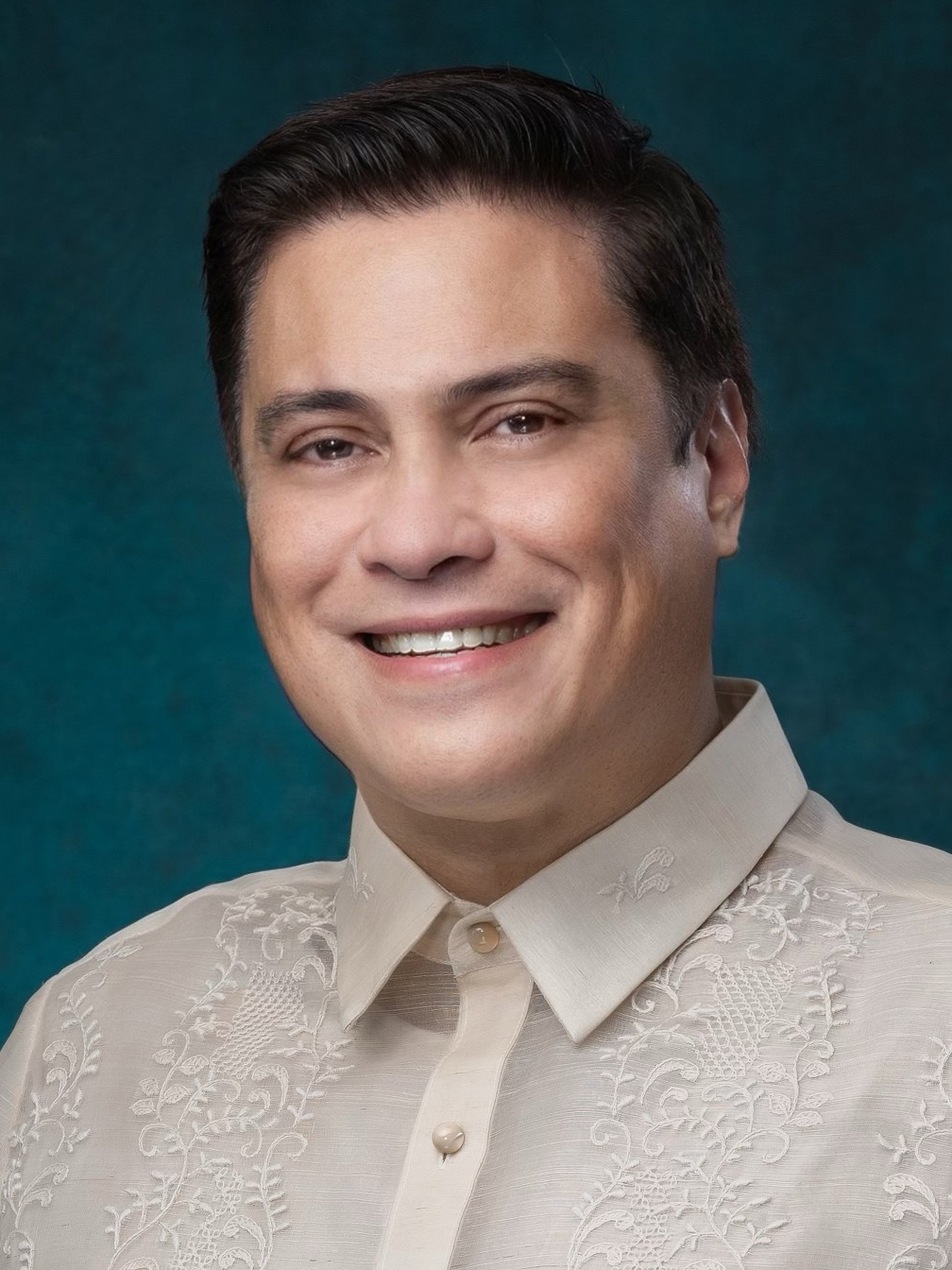
Juan Miguel Zubiri,
until May 20, 2024

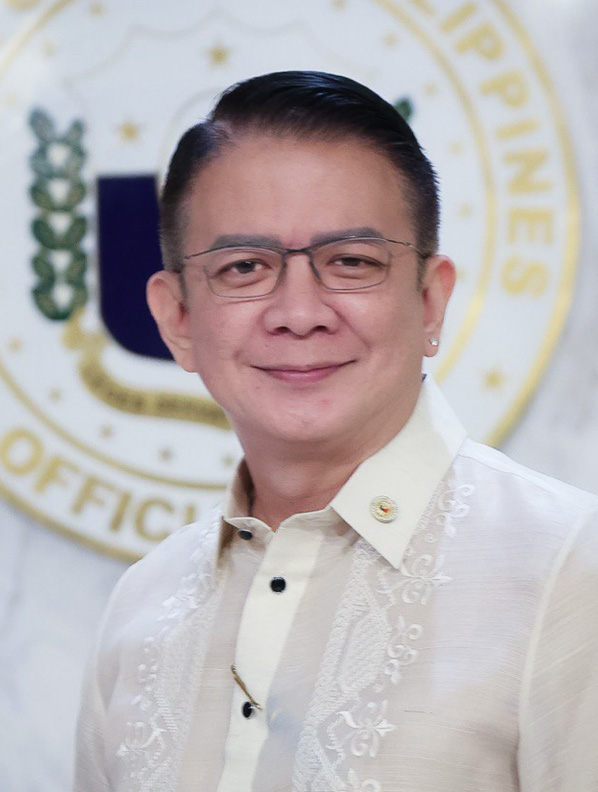
Francis Escudero,
from May 20, 2024

- Senate President:
  - Juan Miguel Zubiri (Independent), until May 20, 2024
  - Francis Escudero (NPC), from May 20, 2024
- Senate President pro tempore:
  - Loren Legarda (NPC), until May 20, 2024
  - Jinggoy Estrada (PMP), from May 20, 2024
- Majority Floor Leader:
  - Joel Villanueva (Independent), until May 20, 2024
  - Francis Tolentino (PFP), from May 20, 2024
- Minority Floor Leader: Koko Pimentel (Nacionalista)

=== House of Representatives ===
House Speaker

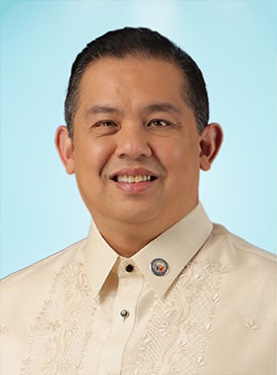
Martin Romualdez

- Speaker: Martin Romualdez (Leyte–1st, Lakas)
- Senior Deputy Speaker:
  - Gloria Macapagal Arroyo (Pampanga–2nd, Lakas), until May 17, 2023
  - Aurelio Gonzales Jr. (Pampanga–3rd, Lakas), from May 17, 2023
- Deputy Speaker:
  - Raymond Mendoza (Party-list, TUCP)
  - Roberto Puno (Antipolo–1st, NUP)
  - Kristine Singson-Meehan (Ilocos Sur–2nd, NPC)
  - Isidro Ungab (Davao City–3rd, Lakas), until November 7, 2023
  - Camille Villar (Las Piñas–Lone, Nacionalista)
  - Ralph Recto (Batangas–6th, Nacionalista), July 27, 2022 – January 12, 2024
  - Aurelio Gonzales Jr. (Pampanga–3rd, PDP–Laban), July 27, 2022 – May 17, 2023
  - Duke Frasco (Cebu–5th, NUP), from July 27, 2022
  - Gloria Macapagal Arroyo (Pampanga–2nd, Lakas), May 17 – November 7, 2023
  - Tonypet Albano (Isabela–1st, Lakas), from November 7, 2023
  - Yasser Balindong (Lanao del Sur–2nd, Lakas), from November 7, 2023
  - David C. Suarez (Quezon–2nd, Lakas), from January 22, 2024
- Majority Floor Leader: Mannix Dalipe (Zamboanga City–2nd, Lakas)
- Senior Deputy Majority Floor Leader: Sandro Marcos (Ilocos Norte–1st, PFP)
- Minority Floor Leader: Marcelino Libanan (Party-list, 4Ps), from July 26, 2022
- Senior Deputy Minority Floor Leader: Paul Daza (Northern Samar–1st, NUP), from July 26, 2022

== Sessions ==
- First Regular Session: July 25, 2022 – June 2, 2023
  - July 25, 2022 – September 30, 2022
  - November 7, 2022 – December 16, 2022
  - January 23, 2023 – March 24, 2023
  - May 8, 2023 – June 2, 2023
- Second Regular Session: July 24, 2023 – May 24, 2024
  - July 24, 2023 – September 29, 2023
  - First Special Session: November 4, 2023
  - November 6, 2023 – December 15, 2023
  - January 22, 2024 – March 22, 2024
  - April 29, 2024 – May 24, 2024
- Third Regular Session: July 22, 2024 – June 11, 2025
  - July 22, 2024 – September 27, 2024
  - November 4, 2024 – December 20, 2024
  - January 13, 2025 – February 7, 2025
  - June 2, 2025 – June 11, 2025

== Members ==
=== Senate ===
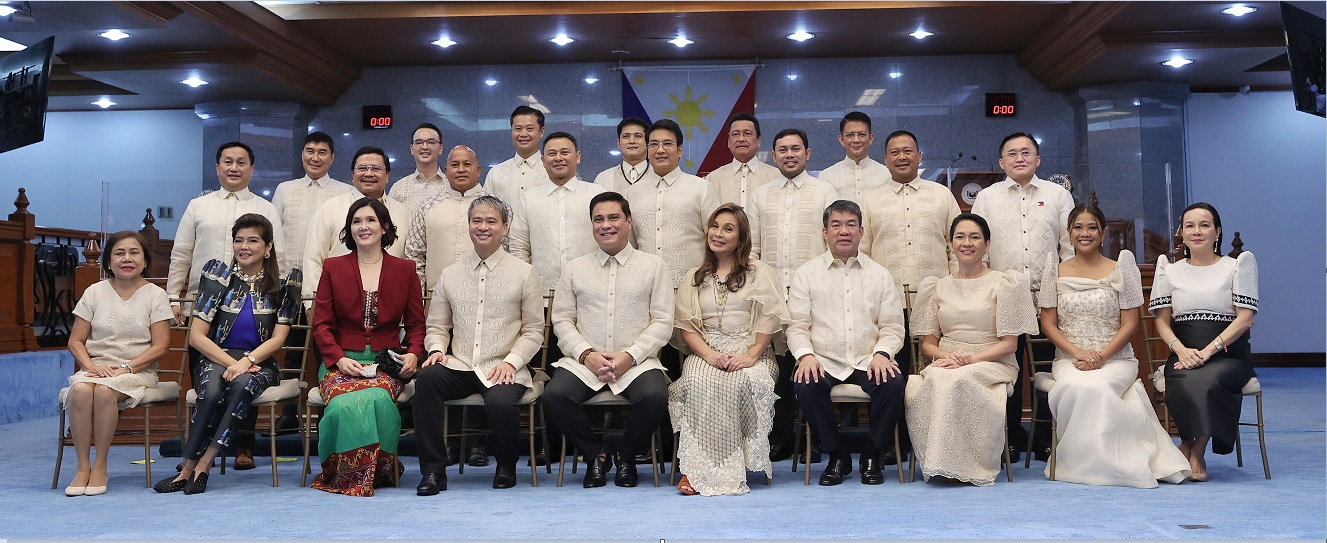
Senators of the 19th Congress, July 25, 2022

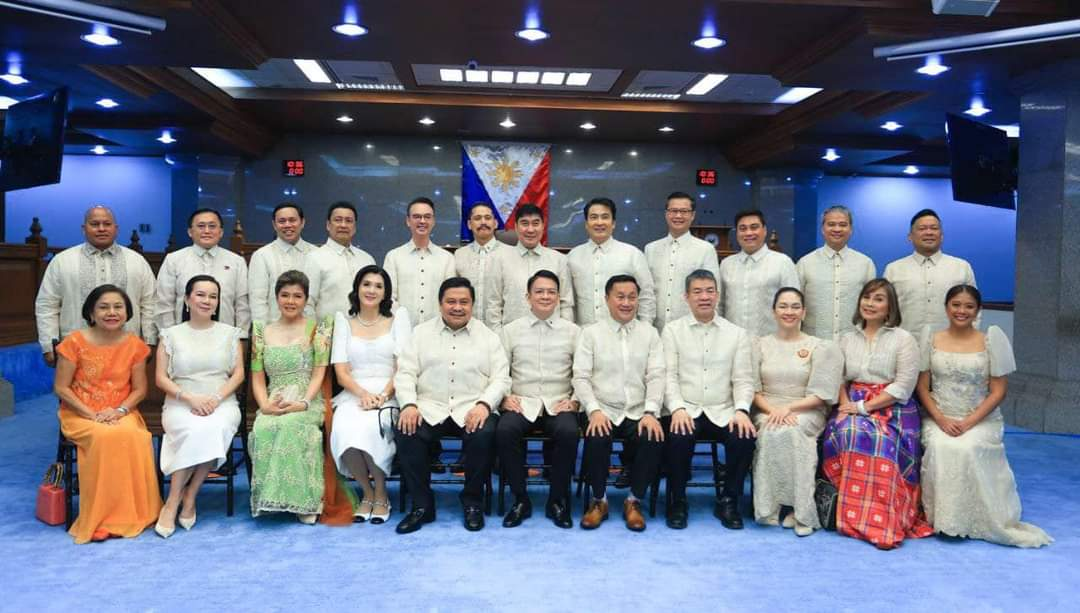
Senators of the 19th Congress, July 22, 2024

The following are the terms of the senators of this Congress, according to the date of election:

- For senators elected on May 13, 2019: June 30, 2019 – June 30, 2025
- For senators elected on May 9, 2022: June 30, 2022 – June 30, 2028

Senator	Party	Term	Term end	Bloc	Registered in
Sonny Angara (Note: Sonny Angara resigned on July 18, 2024, upon being appointed as Secretary of Education.)	LDP	2	2025	Independent	Baler, Aurora
Nancy Binay	UNA	2	2025	Independent	Makati
Alan Peter Cayetano	Independent	1	2028	Independent	Taguig
Pia Cayetano	Nacionalista	1	2025	Majority	Taguig
Ronald dela Rosa	PDP	1	2025	Majority	Santa Cruz, Davao del Sur
JV Ejercito	NPC	1	2028	Independent	San Juan
Francis Escudero	NPC	1	2028	Majority	Sorsogon City, Sorsogon
Jinggoy Estrada	PMP	1	2028	Majority	San Juan
Win Gatchalian	NPC	2	2028	Independent	Valenzuela
Bong Go	PDP	1	2025	Majority	Davao City
Risa Hontiveros	Akbayan	2	2028	Minority	Quezon City
Lito Lapid	NPC	1	2025	Majority	Porac, Pampanga
Loren Legarda	NPC	1	2028	Independent	Pandan, Antique
Imee Marcos	Nacionalista	1	2025	Majority	Laoag, Ilocos Norte
Robin Padilla	PDP	1	2028	Majority	Jose Panganiban, Camarines Norte
Koko Pimentel	Nacionalista (Note: Koko Pimentel was affiliated with PDP–Laban until 2024.)	2	2025	Minority	Cagayan de Oro
Grace Poe	Independent	2	2025	Majority	San Juan
Bong Revilla	Lakas	1	2025	Majority	Bacoor, Cavite
Francis Tolentino	PFP (Note: Francis Tolentino was affiliated with Partido Demokratiko Pilipino until 2024.)	1	2025	Majority	Tagaytay, Cavite
Raffy Tulfo	Independent	1	2028	Majority	Quezon City
Joel Villanueva	Independent	2	2028	Independent	Bocaue, Bulacan
Cynthia Villar	Nacionalista	2	2025	Majority	Las Piñas
Mark Villar	Nacionalista	1	2028	Majority	Las Piñas
Juan Miguel Zubiri	Independent	2	2028	Independent	Maramag, Bukidnon

=== House of Representatives ===
Number of districts per province

Terms of members of the House of Representatives started on June 30, 2022, took office on July 25, and will end on June 30, 2025, unless stated otherwise.

Province/City	District	Representative	Party	Term	Bloc
Abra	Lone	Ching Bernos	Lakas (Note: Affiliated with the Nacionalista Party at election.)	1	Majority
Agusan del Norte	1st	Jose Aquino II	Lakas	1	Majority
Agusan del Norte	2nd	Dale Corvera	Lakas (Note: Affiliated with PDP–Laban at election.)	1	Majority
Agusan del Sur	1st	Alfel Bascug	NUP	2	Majority
Agusan del Sur	2nd	Eddiebong Plaza	NUP	2	Majority
Aklan	1st	Carlito Marquez	NPC	3	Majority
Aklan	2nd	Teodorico Haresco Jr.	Nacionalista	2	Majority
Albay	1st	Edcel Lagman (Note: Edcel Lagman died on January 30, 2025.)	Liberal	3	Minority
Albay	2nd	Joey Salceda	Lakas	3	Majority
Albay	3rd	Fernando Cabredo	NUP	2	Majority
Antipolo	1st	Roberto Puno	NUP	2	Majority
Antipolo	2nd	Romeo Acop	NUP	1	Majority
Antique	Lone	Antonio Legarda Jr.	NPC	1	Majority
Apayao	Lone	Eleanor Begtang	NPC	1	Majority
Aurora	Lone	Rommel T. Angara	LDP	2	Majority
Bacolod	Lone	Greg Gasataya	NPC	3	Majority
Baguio	Lone	Mark Go	Nacionalista	3	Majority
Basilan	Lone	Mujiv Hataman	BUP	2	Minority
Bataan	1st	Geraldine Roman	Lakas	3	Majority
Bataan	2nd	Albert Garcia	NUP	1	Majority
Bataan	3rd	Maria Angela Garcia	NUP	1	Majority
Batanes	Lone	Jun Gato	NPC	2	Majority
Batangas	1st	Eric Buhain	Nacionalista	1	Majority
Batangas	2nd	Gerville Luistro	Lakas (Note: Affiliated with the Nationalist People's Coalition at election.)	1	Majority
Batangas	3rd	Maria Theresa Collantes	NPC	3	Majority
Batangas	4th	Lianda Bolilia	Nacionalista	3	Majority
Batangas	5th	Marvey Mariño	Nacionalista	3	Majority
Batangas	6th	Ralph Recto (Note: Ralph Recto resigned on January 12, 2024, upon being appointed as Secretary of Finance.)	Nacionalista	1	Majority
Benguet	Lone	Eric Yap	Lakas (Note: Affiliated with the United Benguet Party at election.)	2	Majority
Biliran	Lone	Gerardo Espina Jr.	Lakas	2	Majority
Biñan	Lone	Len Alonte	Lakas	3	Majority
Bohol	1st	Edgar Chatto	NUP	2	Majority
Bohol	2nd	Vanvan Aumentado	Lakas (Note: Affiliated with the People's Reform Party at election.)	1	Majority
Bohol	3rd	Alexie Tutor	Lakas	2	Majority
Bukidnon	1st	Jose Manuel Alba	Lakas (Note: Affiliated with Bukidnon Paglaum at election.)	1	Majority
Bukidnon	2nd	Jonathan Keith Flores	Lakas	2	Majority
Bukidnon	3rd	Jose Maria Zubiri Jr.	PFP	1	Majority
Bukidnon	4th	Laarni Roque	Nacionalista	1	Majority
Bulacan	1st	Danny Domingo	NUP	1	Majority
Bulacan	2nd	Tina Pancho	NUP	1	Majority
Bulacan	3rd	Lorna Silverio	NUP	3	Majority
Bulacan	4th	Linabelle Villarica	PFP	1	Majority
Bulacan	5th	Ambrosio Cruz	Lakas	1	Majority
Bulacan	6th	Salvador Pleyto	Lakas	1	Majority
Cagayan	1st	Ramon Nolasco	Lakas	2	Majority
Cagayan	2nd	Baby Alfonso	Lakas	1	Majority
Cagayan	3rd	Joseph Lara	Lakas (Note: Affiliated with the National Unity Party at election.)	2	Majority
Cagayan de Oro	1st	Lordan Suan	Lakas (Note: Affiliated with Padayon Pilipino at election.)	1	Majority
Cagayan de Oro	2nd	Rufus Rodriguez	CDP	2	Majority
Calamba	Lone	Cha Hernandez	Lakas	1	Majority
Caloocan	1st	Oscar Malapitan	Nacionalista	1	Majority
Caloocan	2nd	Mitzi Cajayon	Lakas	1	Majority
Caloocan	3rd	Dean Asistio	Lakas	1	Majority
Camarines Norte	1st	Josefina Tallado	Lakas	2	Majority
Camarines Norte	2nd	Rosemarie Panotes	Lakas	1	Majority
Camarines Sur	1st	Hori Horibata	NUP	1	Majority
Camarines Sur	2nd	Luis Raymund Villafuerte	NUP	3	Majority
Camarines Sur	3rd	Gabriel Bordado	Liberal	3	Minority
Camarines Sur	4th	Arnulf Bryan Fuentebella	NPC	2	Majority
Camarines Sur	5th	Miguel Luis Villafuerte	NUP	1	Majority
Camiguin	Lone	Jurdin Jesus Romualdo	Lakas	1	Majority
Capiz	1st	Tawi Billones	Liberal	3	Majority
Capiz	2nd	Jane Castro	Lakas	1	Majority
Catanduanes	Lone	Eulogio Rodriguez	PFP (Note: Independent at election.)	1	Majority
Cavite	1st	Jolo Revilla	Lakas	1	Majority
Cavite	2nd	Lani Mercado	Lakas	1	Majority
Cavite	3rd	Adrian Jay Advincula	NUP	1	Majority
Cavite	4th	Elpidio Barzaga Jr. (Note: Elpidio Barzaga Jr. died on April 27, 2024.)	NUP	2	Majority
Cavite	5th	Roy Loyola	NPC	1	Majority
Cavite	6th	Antonio Ferrer	NUP	1	Majority
Cavite	7th	Crispin Diego Remulla (Note: Crispin Diego Remulla was elected on February 25, 2023, to succeed representative-elect Jesus Crispin Remulla, who was appointed as Secretary of Justice on June 30, 2022. He took office on February 28, 2023.)	NUP	0	Majority
Cavite	8th	Aniela Tolentino	NUP	1	Majority
Cebu	1st	Rhea Gullas	Lakas	1	Majority
Cebu	2nd	Edsel Galeos	Lakas	1	Majority
Cebu	3rd	Pablo John Garcia	NUP	2	Majority
Cebu	4th	Janice Salimbangon	NUP	2	Majority
Cebu	5th	Duke Frasco	NUP	2	Majority
Cebu	6th	Daphne Lagon	Lakas	1	Majority
Cebu	7th	Peter John Calderon	NPC	3	Majority
Cebu City	1st	Rachel del Mar	NPC	1	Majority
Cebu City	2nd	Eduardo Rama Jr.	Lakas	1	Majority
Cotabato	1st	Joselito Sacdalan	NPC	2	Majority
Cotabato	2nd	Rudy Caoagdan	Nacionalista	2	Majority
Cotabato	3rd	Samantha Santos	Lakas	1	Majority
Davao City	1st	Paolo Duterte	HTL (Note: Affiliated with Hugpong ng Pagbabago at election.)	2	Majority
Davao City	2nd	Vincent Garcia	Lakas	2	Majority
Davao City	3rd	Isidro Ungab	HTL	2	Majority
Davao de Oro	1st	Maricar Zamora	Lakas	1	Majority
Davao de Oro	2nd	Ruwel Peter Gonzaga	PFP	3	Majority
Davao del Norte	1st	Pantaleon Alvarez	Reporma	3	Minority
Davao del Norte	2nd	Alan Dujali	Lakas	2	Majority
Davao del Sur	Lone	John Tracy Cagas	Lakas	1	Majority
Davao Occidental	Lone	Claude Bautista	NPC	1	Majority
Davao Oriental	1st	Nelson Dayanghirang Sr.	Nacionalista	1	Majority
Davao Oriental	2nd	Cheeno Almario	Lakas	1	Majority
Dinagat Islands	Lone	Alan Ecleo	Lakas	2	Majority
Eastern Samar	Lone	Maria Fe Abunda	Lakas	2	Majority
General Santos	Lone	Loreto Acharon	NPC	1	Majority
Guimaras	Lone	Lucille Nava	NUP	3	Majority
Ifugao	Lone	Solomon Chungalao	NPC	2	Majority
Iligan	Lone	Celso Regencia	Lakas	1	Majority
Ilocos Norte	1st	Sandro Marcos	PFP	1	Majority
Ilocos Norte	2nd	Eugenio Angelo Barba	Nacionalista	2	Majority
Ilocos Sur	1st	Ronald Singson	NPC	1	Majority
Ilocos Sur	2nd	Kristine Singson-Meehan	NPC	2	Majority
Iloilo	1st	Janette Garin	Lakas	2	Majority
Iloilo	2nd	Michael Gorriceta	Nacionalista	2	Majority
Iloilo	3rd	Lorenz Defensor	NUP	2	Majority
Iloilo	4th	Ferjenel Biron	Nacionalista	1	Majority
Iloilo	5th	Raul Tupas	Lakas	3	Majority
Iloilo City	Lone	Julienne Baronda	Lakas	2	Majority
Isabela	1st	Tonypet Albano	Lakas	2	Majority
Isabela	2nd	Ed Christopher Go	Lakas	2	Majority
Isabela	3rd	Ian Paul Dy	Lakas	2	Majority
Isabela	4th	Joseph Tan	Lakas	1	Majority
Isabela	5th	Mike Dy III	Lakas	2	Majority
Isabela	6th	Inno Dy	Lakas	2	Majority
Kalinga	Lone	Allen Jesse Mangaoang	Nacionalista	3	Majority
La Union	1st	Paolo Ortega	Lakas	1	Majority
La Union	2nd	Dante Garcia	Lakas	1	Majority
Laguna	1st	Ann Matibag	Lakas	1	Majority
Laguna	2nd	Ruth Hernandez	Lakas	2	Majority
Laguna	3rd	Loreto Amante	Lakas	1	Majority
Laguna	4th	Jam Agarao	PFP	1	Majority
Lanao del Norte	1st	Mohamad Khalid Dimaporo	Lakas	3	Majority
Lanao del Norte	2nd	Aminah Dimaporo	Lakas	1	Majority
Lanao del Sur	1st	Zia Alonto Adiong	Lakas	1	Majority
Lanao del Sur	2nd	Yasser Balindong	Lakas	2	Majority
Lapu-Lapu City	Lone	Cynthia Chan	Lakas	1	Majority
Las Piñas	Lone	Camille Villar	Nacionalista	2	Majority
Leyte	1st	Martin Romualdez	Lakas	2	Majority
Leyte	2nd	Lolita Javier	Nacionalista	2	Majority
Leyte	3rd	Anna Veloso-Tuazon	NUP	1	Majority
Leyte	4th	Richard Gomez	PFP	1	Majority
Leyte	5th	Carl Cari	Lakas	2	Majority
Maguindanao del Norte (Note: Maguindanao del Norte's lone district was created on September 18, 2022, from Maguindanao's 1st district.)	Lone	Dimple Mastura (Note: Bai Dimple Mastura represented Maguindanao's 1st district until September 18, 2022.)	Lakas	1	Majority
Maguindanao del Sur (Note: Maguindanao del Norte's lone district was created on September 18, 2022, from Maguindanao's 2nd district.)	Lone	Mohamad Paglas (Note: Mohamad Paglas represented Maguindanao's 2nd district until September 18, 2022.)	Lakas	1	Majority
Makati	1st	Kid Peña	NPC (Note: Affiliated with the Liberal Party at election.)	2	Majority
Makati	2nd	Luis Campos	NPC	3	Minority
Malabon	Lone	Josephine Lacson-Noel	NPC	2	Majority
Mandaluyong	Lone	Neptali Gonzales II	NUP	2	Majority
Mandaue	Lone	Emmarie Dizon	Lakas	2	Majority
Manila	1st	Ernix Dionisio	Lakas (Note: Affiliated with Asenso Manileño at election.)	1	Majority
Manila	2nd	Rolan Valeriano	NUP	2	Majority
Manila	3rd	Joel Chua	Lakas	1	Majority
Manila	4th	Edward Maceda	NPC	3	Majority
Manila	5th	Irwin Tieng	Lakas	1	Majority
Manila	6th	Benny Abante	NUP	2	Majority
Marikina	1st	Marjorie Ann Teodoro	NUP (Note: Affiliated with the United Nationalist Alliance at election.)	1	Majority
Marikina	2nd	Stella Quimbo	Lakas	2	Majority
Marinduque	Lone	Lord Allan Velasco	NPC	3	Majority
Masbate	1st	Richard Kho	Lakas	1	Majority
Masbate	2nd	Ara Kho	Lakas	1	Majority
Masbate	3rd	Wilton Kho	Lakas	2	Majority
Misamis Occidental	1st	Jason Almonte	Nacionalista	1	Majority
Misamis Occidental	2nd	Ando Oaminal	Lakas	1	Majority
Misamis Oriental	1st	Christian Unabia	Lakas	2	Majority
Misamis Oriental	2nd	Yevgeny Emano	Nacionalista	1	Majority
Mountain Province	Lone	Maximo Dalog Jr.	Nacionalista	2	Majority
Muntinlupa	Lone	Jaime Fresnedi	Liberal	1	Majority
Navotas	Lone	Toby Tiangco	Navoteño	1	Majority
Negros Occidental	1st	Gerardo Valmayor Jr.	NPC	2	Majority
Negros Occidental	2nd	Alfredo Marañon III	NUP	1	Majority
Negros Occidental	3rd	Jose Francisco Benitez (Note: Jose Francisco Benitez resigned on August 16, 2024, upon being appointed as Director-General of the Technical Education and Skills Development Authority.)	PFP	2	Majority
Negros Occidental	4th	Juliet Marie Ferrer	NUP	3	Majority
Negros Occidental	5th	Dino Yulo	Lakas	1	Majority
Negros Occidental	6th	Mercedes Lansang	NPC	1	Majority
Negros Oriental	1st	Jocelyn Sy-Limkaichong	NPC	3	Majority
Negros Oriental	2nd	Chiquiting Sagarbarria	NPC	3	Majority
Negros Oriental	3rd	Arnie Teves (Note: Arnie Teves was expelled on August 16, 2023. A special election was scheduled to be held on December 9, 2023, but was later cancelled.)	NPC	3	Minority
Northern Samar	1st	Paul Daza	NUP	2	Minority
Northern Samar	2nd	Harris Ongchuan	NUP	1	Minority
Nueva Ecija	1st	Mika Suansing	Lakas	1	Majority
Nueva Ecija	2nd	Joseph Gilbert Violago	NUP	1	Majority
Nueva Ecija	3rd	Rosanna Vergara	PFP	3	Majority
Nueva Ecija	4th	Emeng Pascual	Lakas	1	Majority
Nueva Vizcaya	Lone	Luisa Cuaresma	UNA (Note: Affiliated with Lakas–CMD at election.)	3	Majority
Occidental Mindoro	Lone	Odie Tarriela	PFP (Note: Affiliated with Pederalismo ng Dugong Dakilang Samahan at election.)	1	Majority
Oriental Mindoro	1st	Arnan Panaligan	Lakas (Note: Affiliated with Mindoro Bago Sarili at election.)	1	Majority
Oriental Mindoro	2nd	Alfonso Umali Jr.	Liberal	2	Majority
Palawan	1st	Edgardo Salvame (Note: Edgardo Salvame died on March 13, 2024.)	PRP	1	Majority
Palawan	2nd	Jose Alvarez	NPC	1	Majority
Palawan	3rd	Edward Hagedorn (Note: Edward Hagedorn died on October 3, 2023.)	PDP–Laban	1	Majority
Pampanga	1st	Carmelo Lazatin II	Lakas	3	Majority
Pampanga	2nd	Gloria Macapagal Arroyo	Lakas	1	Majority
Pampanga	3rd	Aurelio Gonzales Jr.	Lakas	3	Majority
Pampanga	4th	Anna York Bondoc	Nacionalista	1	Majority
Pangasinan	1st	Arthur Celeste	Nacionalista	1	Majority
Pangasinan	2nd	Mark Cojuangco	NPC	1	Majority
Pangasinan	3rd	Maria Rachel Arenas	Lakas	1	Majority
Pangasinan	4th	Christopher de Venecia	Lakas	3	Majority
Pangasinan	5th	Ramon Guico Jr.	Lakas	1	Majority
Pangasinan	6th	Marlyn Primicias-Agabas	Lakas	1	Majority
Parañaque	1st	Edwin Olivarez	Lakas	3	Majority
Parañaque	2nd	Gustavo Tambunting	NUP	1	Majority
Pasay	Lone	Antonino Calixto	Lakas	2	Majority
Pasig	Lone	Roman Romulo	NPC	2	Majority
Quezon	1st	Mark Enverga	NPC	2	Majority
Quezon	2nd	David Suarez	Lakas	2	Majority
Quezon	3rd	Reynante Arrogancia	NPC (Note: Affiliated with Partido para sa Demokratikong Reporma at election.)	1	Minority
Quezon	4th	Keith Micah Tan	NPC	1	Majority
Quezon City	1st	Arjo Atayde	Nacionalista	1	Majority
Quezon City	2nd	Ralph Tulfo	PFP	1	Majority
Quezon City	3rd	Franz Pumaren	NUP	1	Majority
Quezon City	4th	Marvin Rillo	Lakas	1	Majority
Quezon City	5th	Patrick Michael Vargas	Lakas	1	Majority
Quezon City	6th	Marivic Co-Pilar	NUP	1	Majority
Quirino	Lone	Midy Cua	Lakas	1	Majority
Rizal	1st	Jack Duavit	NPC	3	Majority
Rizal	2nd	Dino Tanjuatco	NPC	1	Majority
Rizal	3rd	Jose Arturo Garcia Jr.	NPC	1	Majority
Rizal	4th	Fidel Nograles	Lakas	2	Majority
Romblon	Lone	Eleandro Jesus Madrona	Nacionalista	2	Majority
Samar	1st	Stephen James Tan	Nacionalista	1	Minority
Samar	2nd	Reynolds Michael Tan	Lakas	1	Minority
San Jose del Monte	Lone	Florida Robes	PFP	3	Majority
San Juan	Lone	Bel Zamora	Lakas	1	Majority
Santa Rosa	Lone	Dan Fernandez	NUP	2	Majority
Sarangani	Lone	Steve Solon	Lakas (Note: Affiliated with the People's Champ Movement at election.)	1	Majority
Siquijor	Lone	Zaldy Villa	Lakas	1	Majority
Sorsogon	1st	Dette Escudero	NPC	1	Majority
Sorsogon	2nd	Wowo Fortes	NPC	1	Majority
South Cotabato	1st	Ed Lumayag	PFP	1	Majority
South Cotabato	2nd	Peter Miguel	Lakas (Note: Affiliated with Partido Federal ng Pilipinas at election.)	1	Majority
Southern Leyte	1st	Luz Mercado	Lakas	1	Majority
Southern Leyte	2nd	Christopherson Yap	Lakas	1	Majority
Sultan Kudarat	1st	Rihan Sakaluran	Lakas	2	Majority
Sultan Kudarat	2nd	Horacio Suansing Jr.	NUP	3	Majority
Sulu	1st	Samier Tan	Lakas	2	Majority
Sulu	2nd	Munir Arbison Jr.	Lakas	1	Majority
Surigao del Norte	1st	Francisco Jose Matugas II	Lakas	3	Majority
Surigao del Norte	2nd	Ace Barbers	Nacionalista	3	Majority
Surigao del Sur	1st	Romeo Momo	Nacionalista	1	Majority
Surigao del Sur	2nd	Johnny Pimentel	NUP	3	Majority
Taguig–Pateros	1st	Ading Cruz	Nacionalista	1	Majority
Taguig	2nd	Pammy Zamora	Lakas	1	Majority
Tarlac	1st	Jaime Cojuangco	NPC	1	Majority
Tarlac	2nd	Christian Yap	SST	1	Majority
Tarlac	3rd	Bong Rivera	NPC	1	Majority
Tawi-Tawi	Lone	Dimszar Sali	NUP	1	Majority
Valenzuela	1st	Rex Gatchalian (Note: Rex Gatchalian resigned on January 31, 2023, upon being appointed as Secretary of Social Welfare and Development.)	NPC	1	Majority
Valenzuela	2nd	Eric Martinez	Independent	3	Majority
Zambales	1st	Jay Khonghun	Lakas	1	Majority
Zambales	2nd	Bing Maniquiz	Lakas (Note: Affiliated with the Sulong Zambales Party at election.)	1	Majority
Zamboanga City	1st	Khymer Adan Olaso	Nacionalista (Note: Affiliated with the Adelante Zamboanga Party at election.)	1	Majority
Zamboanga City	2nd	Mannix Dalipe	Lakas	3	Majority
Zamboanga del Norte	1st	Jon-jon Jalosjos (Note: Jon-jon Jalosjos vacated his seat on July 21, 2022, after the Supreme Court issued a status quo ante order. His election was annulled by the Supreme Court on August 8, 2023.)	Nacionalista	2	–
Zamboanga del Norte	1st	Pinpin Uy (Note: Pinpin Uy was declared elected by the Supreme Court on August 8, 2023. He took office on November 13, 2023.)	Lakas	0	Majority
Zamboanga del Norte	2nd	Glona Labadlabad	Lakas	3	Majority
Zamboanga del Norte	3rd	Ian Amatong	Liberal	1	Majority
Zamboanga del Sur	1st	Divina Grace Yu	Lakas	3	Majority
Zamboanga del Sur	2nd	Victoria Yu	Lakas	1	Majority
Zamboanga Sibugay	1st	Wilter Palma	Lakas	1	Majority
Zamboanga Sibugay	2nd	Antonieta Eudela	Lakas	1	Majority
Party-list		Mikee Romero	1-Pacman	3	Majority
Party-list		Bonifacio Bosita	1-Rider	1	Minority
Party-list		Rodge Gutierrez	1-Rider	1	Minority
Party-list		Marcelino Libanan	4Ps	1	Minority
Party-list		Jonathan Clement Abalos	4Ps	1	Minority
Party-list		Lex Anthony Colada	AAMBIS-Owa	1	Minority
Party-list		Joseph Stephen Paduano	Abang Lingkod	3	Minority
Party-list		Robert Raymond Estrella	Abono	1	Majority
Party-list		France Castro	ACT Teachers	3	Minority
Party-list		Edvic Yap	ACT-CIS	1	Majority
Party-list		Jocelyn Tulfo	ACT-CIS	2	Majority
Party-list		Jeffrey Soriano (Note: Jeffrey Soriano resigned on February 22, 2023.)	ACT-CIS	1	Majority
Party-list		Erwin Tulfo (Note: Erwin Tulfo took office on May 30, 2023, to succeed Jeffrey Soriano.)	ACT-CIS	0	Majority
Party-list		Nicanor Briones	AGAP	1	Majority
Party-list		Bryan Revilla	Agimat	1	Majority
Party-list		Wilbert T. Lee	AGRI	1	Minority
Party-list		Perci Cendaña (Note: Perci Cendaña was seated by the Commission on Elections on September 25, 2024, after the Supreme Court upheld the cancellation of An Waray's registration as a party-list.)	Akbayan	0	Minority
Party-list		Zaldy Co	Ako Bicol	2	Majority
Party-list		Jil Bongalon	Ako Bicol	1	Majority
Party-list		Sonny Lagon	Ako Bisaya	2	Majority
Party-list		Richelle Singson-Michael	Ako Ilocano Ako	1	Majority
Party-list		Anna Suarez	ALONA	3	Majority
Party-list		Bem Noel (Note: Bem Noel was removed on September 27, 2023, after the Commission on Elections cancelled An Waray's registration as a party-list on August 14, 2023.)	An Waray	2	Minority
Party-list		Ray T. Reyes	Anakalusugan	1	Majority
Party-list		Alfred delos Santos	Ang Probinsyano	2	Majority
Party-list		Reynaldo Tamayo (Note: Reynaldo Tamayo died on June 21, 2025.)	Angat	1	Majority
Party-list		Sergio Dagooc	APEC	2	Minority
Party-list		Michael Morden	API	1	Majority
Party-list		Bernadette Herrera	BH	3	Minority
Party-list		Angelica Natasha Co	BHW	2	Majority
Party-list		Nicolas Enciso VIII (Note: Nicolas Enciso VIII was removed on February 15, 2023.)	Bicol Saro	1	Minority
Party-list		Brian Yamsuan (Note: Brian Yamsuan took office on February 22, 2023, to succeed Nicolas Enciso VIII.)	Bicol Saro	0	Minority
Party-list		Eddie Villanueva	CIBAC	2	Majority
Party-list		Felimon Espares	Coop-NATCCO	1	Minority
Party-list		Edwin Gardiola	CWS	1	Majority
Party-list		Claudine Bautista-Lim	DUMPER PTDA	2	Majority
Party-list		Drixie Mae Cardema	Duterte Youth	1	Majority
Party-list		Arlene Brosas	Gabriela	3	Minority
Party-list		Jose Gay Padiernos	GP Party	2	Minority
Party-list		Raoul Manuel	Kabataan	1	Minority
Party-list		Ron Salo	Kabayan	2	Majority
Party-list		Irene Gay Saulog	Kalinga	2	Majority
Party-list		Shernee Tan	Kusug Tausug	3	Majority
Party-list		Allan Ty	LPGMA	2	Majority
Party-list		Roberto Nazal Jr. (Note: Roberto Nazal Jr. took office on October 10, 2022. The Supreme Court nullified Nazal's assumption of office on October 18, 2022, and nullified his nomination as Magsasaka's representative on August 15, 2024.)	Magsasaka	0	–
Party-list		Anthony Golez	Malasakit@Bayanihan	1	Majority
Party-list		Virgilio Lacson	Manila Teachers	3	Majority
Party-list		Carlo Lisandro Gonzalez	Marino	2	Majority
Party-list		Marissa Magsino	OFW	1	Minority
Party-list		Vacant (Note: Grace Yaneza was initially the representative-elect for P3PWD until she was replaced by Rowena Guanzon on June 15, 2022. The Supreme Court prevented Guanzon from taking her seat on June 29, 2022, and nullified her nomination on November 20, 2024. Maria Camille Ilagan replaced Guanzon as the representative-elect on November 20, 2024, but was not able to take office.)	P3PWD	0	–
Party-list		Jorge Antonio Bustos	Patrol	1	Majority
Party-list		Migs Nograles	PBA	1	Majority
Party-list		Presley de Jesus	Philreca	2	Minority
Party-list		Ivan Howard Guintu	Pinuno	1	Majority
Party-list		Rudys Caesar Fariñas	Probinsyano Ako	2	Majority
Party-list		Jernie Jett Nisay	Pusong Pinoy	1	Majority
Party-list		Caroline Tanchay	SAGIP	1	Majority
Party-list		Rodante Marcoleta	SAGIP	2	Majority
Party-list		Rodolfo Ordanes	Senior Citizens	2	Majority
Party-list		Jose Teves Jr.	TGP	2	Majority
Party-list		Yedda Marie Romualdez	Tingog	3	Majority
Party-list		Jude Acidre	Tingog	1	Majority
Party-list		Raymond Mendoza	TUCP	2	Majority
Party-list		Sam Verzosa	Tutok To Win	1	Majority
Party-list		Milagros Magsaysay (Note: Milagros Magsaysay took office on November 7, 2022.)	United Senior Citizens	0	Majority
Party-list		Jojo Ang	Uswag Ilonggo	1	Majority

== Changes in membership ==
=== Senate ===
Vacating member				Special election	Successor		
Member	Party	Date	Reason	Special election	Member	Party	Date
Sonny Angara	LDP	July 18, 2024	Appointed Secretary of Education	None; seat to be filled in the 2025 election.			

=== House of Representatives ===
==== District representatives ====
District	Vacating member				Special election	Successor		
District	Member	Party	Date	Reason	Special election	Member	Party	Date
Cavite–7th	Jesus Crispin Remulla	NUP	June 30, 2022	Appointed Secretary of Justice	February 25, 2023	Crispin Diego Remulla	NUP	February 28, 2023
Zamboanga del Norte–1st	Romeo Jalosjos Jr.	Nacionalista	July 21, 2022	Vacated seat as per Supreme Court order	—N/a	Roberto Uy Jr.	Lakas	November 13, 2023
Valenzuela–1st	Rex Gatchalian	NPC	January 31, 2023	Appointed Secretary of Social Welfare and Development	Not held			
Negros Oriental–3rd	Arnolfo Teves Jr.	NPC	March 22, 2023	Suspended for 60 days	—			
Negros Oriental–3rd	Arnolfo Teves Jr.	NPC	May 31, 2023	Suspended for 60 days	—			
Negros Oriental–3rd	Arnolfo Teves Jr.	NPC	August 16, 2023	Expelled	Cancelled			
Palawan–3rd	Edward Hagedorn	PDP–Laban	October 3, 2023	Died in office	Not held			
Batangas–6th	Ralph Recto	Nacionalista	January 12, 2024	Appointed Secretary of Finance	Not held			
Palawan–1st	Edgardo Lim–Salvame	PRP	March 13, 2024	Died in office	Not held			
Cavite–4th	Elpidio Barzaga Jr.	NUP	April 27, 2024	Died in office	Not held			
Negros Occidental–3rd	Jose Francisco Benitez	PFP	August 16, 2024	Appointed Director-General of the Technical Education and Skills Development Authority	Not held			
Albay–1st	Edcel Lagman	Liberal	January 30, 2025	Died in office	Not held			

==== Party-list representatives ====
Member	Party	Date	Reason	Successor	Took office
Nicolas Enciso VIII	Bicol Saro	February 15, 2023	Dropped from the rolls	Brian Yamsuan	February 22, 2023
Jeffrey Soriano	ACT-CIS	February 22, 2023	Resigned	Erwin Tulfo	May 30, 2023
Florencio Gabriel Noel	An Waray	September 27, 2023	Dropped from the rolls	None. Party list registration was cancelled by the COMELEC En Banc. Vacant seat later was filled by Akbayan with Perci Cendaña being sworn in September 25, 2024.	
Reynaldo Tamayo	ANGAT	June 21, 2025	Died in office	None. Seat not to be filled, lost re-election in the 2025 election.	

== Delegations in constitutional bodies ==
Committee	Senate				House of Representatives					
Committee	Chairman	Party	Minority leader	Party	Chairman	Party	District	Minority leader	Party	District
Commission on Appointments	Francis Escudero	Independent	Alan Peter Cayetano	Independent	Ramon Guico Jr.	Lakas–CMD	Pangasinan–5th	Johnny Pimentel	PDP	Surigao del Sur–2nd
Judicial and Bar Council	Francis Tolentino	PFP	—N/a		Yoyette Ferrer	NUP	Negros Occidental–4th	—N/a		
Senate Electoral Tribunal	Robin Padilla	PDP	—N/a		—N/a					
House of Representatives Electoral Tribunal	—N/a				Vincent Garcia	Lakas	Davao City–2nd	—N/a		
