= Philippine House Committee on Good Government and Public Accountability =

Standing committee of the House of Representatives of the Philippines

Committee on Good Government and Public Accountability
- 20th Congress

History
- New session started: To convene on July 28, 2025

Leadership
- Chairman: Vacant
- Minority Leader: Vacant

Website
- Committee on Good Government and Public Accountability

The Philippine House Committee on Good Government and Public Accountability, or House Good Government and Public Accountability Committee is a standing committee of the Philippine House of Representatives.

== Jurisdiction ==
As prescribed by House Rules, the committee's jurisdiction is on the malfeasance, misfeasance and nonfeasance in office committed by government employees and officials which covers its political subdivisions and instrumentalities. It also includes investigations of any matter of public interest on its own initiative or upon order of the House.

== Members, 20th Congress ==
As of June 30, 2025, all committee membership positions are vacant until the House convenes for its first regular session on July 28.

Position	Members	Party	Province/City	District
Chairperson	Joel Chua	NUP	Manila	3rd

== Historical membership rosters ==
=== 19th Congress ===
Position	Members	Party	Province/City	District
Chairperson	Joel Chua	Lakas–CMD	Manila	3rd
Vice Chairpersons	Bienvenido Abante Jr.	National Unity Party	Manila	6th
Vice Chairpersons	Romeo Acop	National Unity Party	Antipolo	2nd
Vice Chairpersons	Janette Garin	Lakas–CMD	Iloilo	1st
Vice Chairpersons	Jefferson F. Khonghun	Nacionalista	Zambales	1st
Vice Chairpersons	Johnny Pimentel	National Unity Party	Surigao del Sur	2nd
Vice Chairpersons	Crispin Diego "Ping" Remulla	National Unity Party	Cavite	7th
Vice Chairpersons	Roberto "Pinpin" Uy Jr.	Lakas–CMD	Zamboanga del Norte	1st
Vice Chairpersons	Edvic Yap	ACT-CIS	Party-list	
Members for the Majority	Jonathan Keith Flores	Lakas–CMD	Bukidnon	2nd
Members for the Majority	Loreto "Amben" S. Amante	Lakas–CMD	Laguna	3rd
Members for the Majority	Anna York Bondoc	Nacionalista	Pampanga	4th
Members for the Majority	Dale Corvera	Lakas–CMD	Agusan del Norte	2nd
Members for the Majority	Ricardo "Ading" Cruz Jr.	Nacionalista	Taguig–Pateros	1st
Members for the Majority	Rachel "Cutie" del Mar	NPC	Cebu City	1st
Members for the Majority	Arnulf Bryan Fuentebella	NPC	Camarines Sur	4th
Members for the Majority	Charisse Anne "Cha" Hernandez	Lakas–CMD	Calamba	At-large
Members for the Majority	Edward Maceda	NPC	Manila	4th
Members for the Majority	Arnan Panaligan	Lakas–CMD	Oriental Mindoro	1st
Members for the Majority	Horacio P. Suansing Jr.	NUP	Sultan Kudarat	2nd
Members for the Majority	Rolando M. Valeriano	NUP	Manila	2nd

=== 18th Congress ===
Position	Members	Party	Province/City	District
Chairperson	Michael Edgar Aglipay	DIWA	Party-list	
Vice Chairpersons	Jesus Crispin Remulla	Nacionalista	Cavite	7th
Vice Chairpersons	Jake Vincent Villa	NPC	Siquijor	Lone
Vice Chairpersons	Abraham Tolentino	NUP	Cavite	8th
Vice Chairpersons	David "Jay-Jay" Suarez	Nacionalista	Quezon	2nd
Vice Chairpersons	Enrico Pineda	1PACMAN	Party-list	
Vice Chairpersons	Eric Yap	ACT-CIS	Party-list	
Members for the Majority	Narciso Bravo Jr.	NUP	Masbate	1st
Members for the Majority	Romeo "Jon-jon" Jalosjos Jr.	Nacionalista	Zamboanga del Norte	1st
Members for the Majority	Sol Aragones	Nacionalista	Laguna	3rd
Members for the Majority	Mario Vittorio Mariño	Nacionalista	Batangas	5th
Members for the Majority	Antonio Albano	NUP	Isabela	1st
Members for the Majority	Lorna Silverio	NUP	Bulacan	3rd
Members for the Majority	Samantha Louise Vargas-Alfonso	NUP	Cagayan	2nd
Members for the Majority	Cyrille Abueg-Zaldivar	PPP	Palawan	2nd
Members for the Majority	Jorge Antonio Bustos	Patrol	Party-list	
Members for the Majority	Ed Christopher Go	Nacionalista	Isabela	2nd
Members for the Majority	Vincent Franco Frasco	Lakas	Cebu	5th
Members for the Majority	Emmarie Ouano-Dizon	PDP–Laban	Cebu	6th
Members for the Majority	Cesar Jimenez Jr.	PDP–Laban	Zamboanga City	1st
Members for the Majority	Claudine Bautista-Lim	DUMPER-PTDA	Party-list	
Members for the Majority	Carlo Lisandro Gonzalez	Marino	Party-list	
Members for the Majority	Raul Tupas	Nacionalista	Iloilo	5th
Members for the Majority	Allan U. Ty	LPGMA	Party-list	
Members for the Majority	Presley de Jesus	PHILRECA	Party-list	
Members for the Majority	Adriano Ebcas	Ako Padayon	Party-list	
Members for the Majority	Maricel Natividad-Nagaño	PRP	Nueva Ecija	4th
Members for the Majority	Vicente Veloso III	NUP	Leyte	3rd
Members for the Minority	Gabriel Bordado Jr.	Liberal	Camarines Sur	3rd
Members for the Minority	Ferdinand Gaite	Bayan Muna	Party-list	
Members for the Minority	Stella Quimbo	Liberal	Marikina	2nd
Members for the Minority	Argel Joseph Cabatbat	Magsasaka	Party-list	
Members for the Minority	Angelica Natasha Co	BHW	Party-list	

==== Chairpersons ====
- Jose Antonio Sy-Alvarado (Bulacan–1st, NUP) July 22, 2019 – November 25, 2020
- Michael Edgar Aglipay (DIWA Partylist) (November 25, 2020 – June 30, 2022)
- Florida "Rida" Robes (San Jose del Monte, PDP) (July 26, 2022 – September 3, 2024)

== See also ==
- House of Representatives of the Philippines
- List of Philippine House of Representatives committees
