= Eric Yap =

Filipino politician (born 1979)

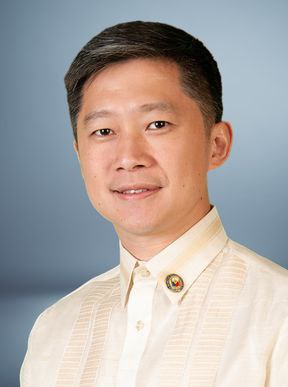
- Official portrait, 2025

Member of the Philippine House of Representatives from Benguet
- Incumbent
- Assumed office June 30, 2022; Caretaker: January 20, 2020 – June 30, 2022
- Preceded by: Nestor Fongwan

Member of the Philippine House of Representatives for ACT-CIS party-list
- In office June 30, 2019 – June 30, 2022 Serving with Jocelyn Pua-Tulfo and Niña Taduran
House committee chairmanships
Chair of the House Committee on Appropriations
In office March 2, 2020 – July 25, 2022
Preceded by	Isidro Ungab
Succeeded by	Elizaldy Co
Chair of the House Committee on Games and Amusements
In office July 22, 2019 – March 2, 2020
Preceded by	Gustavo Tambunting
Succeeded by	Joseph Bernos

Personal details
- Born: Eric Go Yap; May 11, 1979 (age 47) Santa Cruz, Manila, Philippines
- Party: Lakas–CMD (2024–present); United Benguet Party (local party; 2021–present)
- Other political affiliations: ACT-CIS (2018–2022)
- Relations: Edvic Yap (brother)
- Education: University of Santo Tomas (BS)

Eric Go Yap (born May 11, 1979) is a Filipino politician serving as the Representative for Benguet's lone congressional district since 2022, and was the district's legislative caretaker from January 2020 until he was elected in his own right. He was a party-list representative for ACT-CIS from 2019 to 2022, and is the chairman of the House Committee on Appropriations from March 2020 until 2022.

Yap is among the principal authors of House Bill No. 5477 which was signed into law as Republic Act No. 11463 in December 2019 as an act to establish the Malasakit Centers—a one-stop shop for government medical and financial assistance and among the main proponents of House Bill 7778 or the establishment of the Autonomous Region of the Cordillera.

Yap spearheaded various programs in Benguet such as Mobile Tulong, Mobile Oxygen, Youth Assistance Program, and infrastructure projects.

== Early life and education ==
Yap was born on May 11, 1979 in Quezon City. His father was Engracio Yap and his siblings include Edvic Yap, a member of the House of Representatives for ACT-CIS Partylist, and Egay Yap, a member of the Quezon City Council.

He studied in the University of Santo Tomas from 1997 to 2002, where he graduated with a Bachelor of Science in Architecture degree.

In 2017, Senator Panfilo Lacson named Eric and Edvic Yap in an alleged bribery scheme involving the Bureau of Customs and former customs commissioner Nicanor Faeldon.

== Political career ==
=== House of Representatives ===
==== Representative of ACT-CIS party-list ====
Yap, along with Jocelyn Pua-Tulfo and Rowena Niña Taduran, were elected as party-list representatives for ACT-CIS in the 2019 elections. Garnering 2.6 million votes (9.45% of the turnout), ACT-CIS topped the party-list election and won the maximum three seats. On the commencement of the 18th congress, Yap was appointed as chairman of the Games and Amusements Committee.

Yap was one of the principal authors of House Bill No. 5477 which was signed into law as Republic Act No. 11463 by President Duterte in December 2019 which institutionalizes the Malasakit Centers—a one-stop shop for government medical and financial assistance.

On March 2, 2020, Yap was appointed as chairman of the Appropriations Committee replacing Isidro Ungab (Davao City–3rd). Yap is the first neophyte congressman and first party-list representative to lead the Committee on Appropriations.

In June 2020, Yap along with Paolo Duterte and Lord Allan Velasco, filed House Bill No. 7031 which aims to rename Ninoy Aquino International Airport (NAIA) to Paliparang Pandaigdig ng Pilipinas. Yap explained that they were "not discrediting the heroic contributions of late Senator Aquino...we just deem it more appropriate for our international airport to bear the name of the country. Instead of it reflecting just one hero, we want it to reflect our everyday heroes—the Filipino people."

==== ABS-CBN franchise, House leadership crisis ====
In July 2020, amid the House's hearing on the franchise renewal of ABS-CBN, Yap disclosed that an emissary from the media company attempted to bribe him ₱200 million to vote in favor of the network's franchise renewal. Yap responded that his "principle and vote are not for sale". In an official statement, ABS-CBN denied Yap's allegations, saying: "We believe in the process and we have participated in the process". Yap later clarified that "he was not accusing ABS-CBN", explaining that he received a phone call from "someone claiming to be an ABS-CBN emissary", and that he was not able to verify if the caller's claims were true. On July 10, Yap, together with 69 other members of the Committee on Legislative Franchises, voted to deny the renewal of ABS-CBN's franchise.

During the speakership crisis between Alan Peter Cayetano and Lord Allan Velasco, the former met with Paolo Duterte and Yap. However, Yap clarified that he did not side with either of the two. On October 13, when Cayetano and Velasco both claimed to be the speaker, Yap requested the rivals to settle the issue or else he, as chairman of the Committee on Appropriations, would handle the deliberations for the 2021 national budget. When Velasco replaced Cayetano, Yap was allowed to keep his committee chairmanship. On November 18, he became a vice chair of the Committee on Accounts where Paolo Duterte was the new chairman.

==== Legislative caretaker of Benguet ====
After the death of Benguet representative Nestor Fongwan on December 18, 2019, Yap was appointed as the legislative caretaker of the district on January 20, 2020. The appointment became controversial as Yap is not from Benguet or Cordillera. The Sangguniang Panlalawigan (SP) of Benguet has passed a resolution asking Congress to conduct a special election to fill the vacancy in the House. In May 2020, the SP passed another resolution making Yap an "adopted son of Benguet" in recognition for his sincere support for the province.

One of Yap's plans for Benguet was to re-nationalize Benguet General Hospital (BeGH) and increase its bed capacity. In September 2020, he attended the opening ceremony of BeGH's molecular biology laboratory, which he personally funded. However, the project was criticized for bearing Yap's name as Benguet General Hospital Molecular Biology Laboratory Eric Yap Building. Yap said he was unaware that the hospital management named the laboratory after him. He then asked the management to remove his name from the laboratory.

Yap was known to visit remote areas of Benguet to extend public service and implement projects.

In October 2021, presidential aspirant and Senator Manny Pacquiao accused Yap of being involved in alleged overpriced slope protection and flood control projects in Benguet. Yap lamented that his political opponents were attempting to discredit him by using Pacquiao. A few days after the accusation, Benguet mayors came to Yap's defense and expressed dismay at Pacquiao's pronouncements saying:

We are saddened that Senator Pacquiao came and just questioned Congressman Yap’s presence in Benguet. It should not need emphasis but for Senator Pacquiao’s informed realization, Congressman Yap is our own. He was adopted by us. He is one of us.

— Mayors of the Municipalities of Benguet, Statement of Support for Cong. Eric Yap

==== Committee assignments and House positions ====
Yap served on the following House committees and in the following House positions.

- 18th congress (2019–2022) – Chair of the Committee on Appropriations (since March 2, 2020); chair of the Committee on Games and Amusements (until March 2, 2020); a vice chair of the Committees on Games and Amusements (since March 2, 2020), Good Government and Public Accountability, Government Enterprises and Privatization, Ways and Means, and Accounts (since November 18, 2020); member of the Committees on Banks and Financial Intermediaries; Energy; Flagship Programs and Projects; Foreign Affairs; Higher and Technical Education; Justice; Legislative Franchises; Overseas Workers Affairs; Public Accounts; Public Works and Highways; and Transportation.

==== Congressman of Benguet ====
Yap was elected as Representative for Benguet's lone congressional district by a landslide over his closest rival, Itogon mayor Victor Palangdan in the 2022 May elections.

In the 2025 elections, another landslide victory for Yap was recorded with 144,093 votes, although his proclamation was suspended due to a disqualification complaint regarding his citizenship which was dismissed for lack of evidence in June 2025.

==== Flood control projects scandal ====
In September 2025, Orly Guteza, a former security officer for Ako Bicol party-list Representative Zaldy Co, said that Yap delivered 46 suitcases of money as kickback to Co's home in Pasig City. Yap denied involvement in the kickback scheme.

In October 2025, Ombudsman Jesus Crispin Remulla said that Eric Yap was a "person of interest" in a corruption complaint filed by the Department of Public Works and Highways (DPWH) in relation to anomalous government flood control projects in La Union. Yap is a former owner of Silverwolves Construction Corporation, which was awarded flood control project worth ₱96.5 million. Senate President Pro Tempore Panfilo Lacson said in November 2025 that the Senate Blue Committee is inviting Yap and former Speaker Martin Romualdez to testify in its investigation on government corruption.

In December 2025, the Court of Appeals ordered the freezing of Eric Yap's assets due to his alleged involvement in the flood control corruption scandal, according to President Bongbong Marcos. The court froze 280 bank accounts linked to Eric Yap, Edvic Yap, Silverwolves Construction Corporation, and Sky Yard Aviation Corporation.

== Personal life ==
Yap is a close friend of Paolo Duterte. He resides in Alphaland Baguio Mountain Lodges in Loacan, Itogon, Benguet, a luxury master-planned development owned by the same company that runs Balesin Island Club.

Yap was a judge at the finals night of Miss Universe Philippines 2020, the pageant's first edition.
