= Nominees in the 2016 Philippine House of Representatives party-list election =

These are the list of the party-list groups (and their nominees) who are qualified for the 2016 Philippine House of Representatives elections.

139 party-list groups were part of the "initial list" of candidates for the 2016 elections, released by the Commission of Elections on January 22, 2016. The party-list slots were drawn via electronic raffle. It only trimmed down to 115 after the COMELEC released the final list of party-list groups that would be included in the printed ballots.

The list of the partylist and their nominees are available online on the COMELEC's website.

Winning party-lists and their elected nominees are in bold.

== List ==
1. **Agri-Agra na Reporma para sa Magsasaka ng Pilipinas Movement (AGRI)**
  1. **Delphine Lee** (incumbent)
  2. **Orestes Salon**
  3. Susana Reyes
  4. Daisy Gan
  5. Ricardo Gutierrez Jr.
2. Academicians, Students and Educators Alliance (Asean, Inc.)
  1. Winifred Ballada
  2. Nilo Burgos
  3. Roberto Gonzales
  4. Ludivinia Victorino
  5. Peterwille Chua
  6. Loida Masinsin
  7. Rey Fernan Refozar
  8. Rosalie Balhag
  9. Erald Pantoja
3. Movement for Economic Transformation and Righteous Opportunities (METRO)
  1. Rodolfo Teope
  2. Karl Jonathan Aguilar
  3. Mark Ortiz
  4. Rosa Clemencia
  5. Donato Tuazon
4. Tribal Communities Association of the Philippines (Tricap)
  1. Jennifer Pia Sibug-Las
  2. Kilala Pacita Salvan-Panis
  3. Gerlyn Coguit
  4. Estrella Estrada
  5. Saturnino Lavada
5. **Abang Lingkod**
  1. **Stephen Paduano** (incumbent)
  2. Manuel Iway
  3. Jeffrey Hidalgo
  4. Raissa Saipudin
  5. Edgardo Estacio
  6. George Arnel Piso
6. **Democratic Independent Workers Association (DIWA)**
  1. **Emmeline Aglipay-Villar** (incumbent)
  2. Pepito Pico
  3. Leopoldo Blanco Jr.
  4. Ely Quiñola
  5. Michael Angelo Datuin
7. Akbay Kalusugan (AKIN)
  1. Carmelita Crisologo
  2. Corazon Alma de Leon
  3. Benjamin Moraleda Jr.
  4. Maria Suzette Ranillo
  5. Benjamin Jan Villamayor
8. **Agricultural Sector Alliance of the Philippines (AGAP)**
  1. **Rico Geron** (incumbent)
  2. Kathleen Briones
  3. Victorino Michael Lescano
  4. Benjamin Jaro
  5. Cipriano Dennis Cocadiz
9. **Serbisyo sa Bayan Party (SBP)**
  1. **Ricardo Belmonte Jr.**
  2. Dorothy Delarmente
  3. Bart Christian Corpus
  4. Manuel Lopez II
  5. Jose Ronaldo Gajudo
10. Association for Development Dedicated to Agriculture and Fisheries (ADDA)
  1. Kristine Singson-Meehan
  2. Jemarose Gomintong
  3. Leonofre Gironella
  4. Chester Elaydo
  5. Antonio Sanchez
11. Anti-War/Anti-Terror Mindanao Peace Movement (Awat Mindanao)
  1. Jose Agduma II
  2. Diomedes Fanlo Jr.
  3. Christy Joy Arellano
  4. Marjorie Lacambra
  5. Johnny Padua
12. Alagaan Natin Ating Kalusugan (Anakalusugan)
  1. Marc Caesar Morales
  2. Julius Malicdem
  3. Irma Astilla-Balulot
  4. Almera Grace Mayo
  5. Janet Kabayama
  6. Venus Agustin
  7. Zosimo Maglangit Jr.
  8. Jose Lorenzana
  9. Isidro Carumba Jr.
  10. Fulgencio dela Cruz Jr.
13. Central Luzon Alliance for Socialized Education (CLASE)
  1. Renato Legaspi
  2. Luisito de Jesus
  3. Reynato Arimbuyutan
  4. Marcelo Fernandez
  5. Sabino Manglicmot
14. **Akbayan Citizens Action Party (Akbayan)**
  1. **Tomasito Villarin**
  2. Barry Gutierrez (incumbent)
  3. Angelina Katoh (incumbent)
  4. Rafaela Mae David
  5. Doris Obena
  6. Mylene Hega
  7. Cenon Nolasco
15. Alliance of Philippine Fishing Federations (All-Fish)
  1. Arnold Naval
  2. Peter Paul Santos
  3. Edgar Lim
  4. Jacqueline Anne Yao
  5. Leonida Jusay
16. **Ako Bicol Political Party (Ako Bicol)**
  1. **Rodel Batocabe** (incumbent)
  2. **Alfredo Garbin**
  3. **Christopher Co** (incumbent)
  4. Ronald Ang
  5. Jason Rodenas
  6. Nikko Batingana
17. Sinag Tungo sa Kaunlaran (SINAG)
  1. Narciso Santiago III
  2. Nina Ynares
  3. Gil Raymond Umali
  4. Orlando Nagaño
  5. Eriberto Fajardo
  6. Joselito Balmaceda
  7. Ronaldo Dauz
  8. Domingo Ison
  9. Virgilio Fernandez
  10. Jesus Soriano Jr.
18. 1-Abilidad
  1. Puramaryver Saquing
  2. Manuelito Luna
  3. Karen Curaza
  4. Marichu Benavides
  5. Glennford Lintag
19. Global Workers and Family Federation (Global)
  1. Ermie Lagman-Garon
  2. Cicero Villanueva
  3. Emman Quibuyen
  4. Gerald Medina
  5. Erminda Lagman
20. **Una Ang Edukasyon (1-Ang Edukasyon)**
  1. Salvador Belaro Jr.
  2. Nestor dela Cruz
  3. Dexter Francisco
21. **Cooperative NATCCO Network Party (Coop-NATCCO)**
  1. **Anthony Bravo** (incumbent)
  2. **Sabiniano Canama**
  3. Emmanuel Solis Jr.
  4. Divina Quemi
  5. Edgar Caballeda
  6. Clarita Napoles
  7. Ramil Santos
  8. Rosalino Sumile
  9. Reynaldo Gandionco
22. Alay Buhay Community Development Foundation (Alay Buhay)
  1. Antonio Sayo
  2. Mark Cholo Violago
  3. Rodolfo Mallari
  4. Crisanto Sabino
  5. Ariel Go
23. Anak Central Party (ACP)
  1. Edgardo Loveria
  2. Johny Castillo
  3. Edna Rivera
  4. Edelmark Capiendo
  5. Reynaldo Nunga
24. Guardians Brotherhood (1-GB)
  1. Patrick Velez
  2. Rolando Bernardo
  3. Ubaldo Matanguihan
  4. Edson Tandoc
  5. Arturo Narvaez
25. **One Patriotic Coalition of Marginalized Nationals (1Pacman)**
  1. **Mikee Romero**
  2. **Enrico Pineda**
  3. Nicolas Enciso VIII
  4. Marvee Espejo
  5. Ildebrando Viernesto
26. Movement of Women for Change and Reform (Melchora)
  1. Mary Grace Ibuna
  2. Danton Remoto
  3. Maria Lourdes Angelica Suntay
  4. Aida Estabillo
  5. Princess Fatima Izan Kiram
27. One Advocacy for Health Progress and Opportunity (1-AHAPO)
  1. Silvestre Bello III (incumbent)
  2. Victorino Atienza
  3. Julius Caesar Herrera
  4. Hilda Clave
  5. Edgar Llarena
28. Tingog Sinirangan
  1. Jude Acidre
  2. Daciano David Palami
  3. Sharilee Angela Gaspay-Mauro
  4. Alexis Yu
  5. Lydia Fustanes
29. Partido ng Bayan ang Bida (PBB)
  1. Lorenzo Cadsawan
  2. Carlos Cao Jr.
  3. Roger Federezo
  4. Evangeline Reyes
  5. Marvin Go
30. **Kabalikat ng Mamamayan (Kabayan)**
  1. **Harry Roque**
  2. **Ron Salo**
  3. Ciriaco Calalang
  4. Paul Hernandez
  5. Joshua Sebastian
31. **ACT Teachers**
  1. **Antonio Tinio** (incumbent)
  2. **France Castro**
  3. Raymond Basilio
  4. David Michael San Juan
  5. Gregorio Fabros
32. **Ang Kabuhayan**
  1. **Dennis Laogan**
  2. Marites de Salla
  3. Elizalde Castro
  4. Rogelio de Leon
  5. Eduardo Allosa
33. Kaisahan ng mga Maliliit na Magsasaka (KMM)
  1. Honorio Samaniego
  2. Maria Flores
  3. Mario del Rosario
  4. Mario Aliga Sr.
  5. Roberto Briones
34. **You Against Corruption and Poverty (YACAP)**
  1. **Benhur Lopez Jr.**
  2. Alberto Tañga
  3. Virgelio Castillo Jr.
  4. Jerlyn Baldicantos
  5. Rhonda Felizmeña
35. Tanggol Maralita (TAMA)
  1. Darlito dela Cruz
  2. Queen Ashley Ablan
  3. Gilda Gonzales-Peralta
  4. Christopher John Gamboa
  5. Ronnie Malunes
  6. Filomena Aligayo
  7. Rodrigo Garcia
36. **Gabriela Women's Party (Gabriela)**
  1. **Emmi de Jesus** (incumbent)
  2. **Arlene Brosas**
  3. Bai Ali Mallen
  4. Leona Entena
  5. Geraldine de Veyra
  6. Jenelyn Nagrampa-Caballero
  7. Marden Jalado-on
  8. Leny Ocasiones
  9. Rhodora Bulosan
  10. Julie Baciles
37. Sanlakas
  1. Leodigario de Guzman
  2. Jose Aaron Pedrosa Jr.
  3. Roldan Gonzales
  4. Flores Zacate
  5. Erastus Noel Delizo
38. Abakada Guro (Abakada)
  1. Jonathan dela Cruz (incumbent)
  2. Alexander Lopez
  3. Anthony Jude Violago
  4. Julian Rodrigo dela Cruz
  5. Josephine Reyes
  6. Samantha Pilar Magahum
39. **Arts Business and Science Professionals (ABS)**
  1. **Eugene Michael de Vera**
  2. Ulysses Garces
  3. Catalina Lanting
  4. Mary Jazul
  5. Carlito Buentipo
40. **LPG Marketers Association (LPGMA)**
  1. **Arnel Ty** (incumbent)
  2. Miguel Ponce Jr.
  3. Miguelito Bernal Jr.
  4. Orlando Reyes
  5. Tirso Calapit
41. Union of Nationalist Democratic Filipino Organization (UNIDO)
  1. Josef Maganduga
  2. Jose Bayani Laurel Jr.
  3. Camille Isabella Laurel
  4. Arturo Libera
  5. Jonathan Padua
42. Kilos Mamamayan Ngayon Na (KM Ngayon Na)
  1. Doris Ramirez
  2. Jose Morales
  3. John Riel
  4. Liwayway Forte
  5. Maria Cecilia Villanueva
43. **Angkla: Ang Partido ng mga Pilipinong Marino (Angka)**
  1. **Jesulito Manalo** (incumbent)
  2. Ronald Enrile
  3. Augusto Perez Jr.
  4. Petercon Lugue
  5. Bernadette Blanco
44. **Alliance of Organizations, Networks and Associations of the Philippines (ALONA)** (Note: Anna Suarez took office as ALONA's representative.)
  1. Ted Lazaro
  2. Ma. Brenda Dimayuga
  3. Ricky Juab
  4. Adelaida Lazaro
  5. Perpetua Calinog
45. Talino at Galing ng Pinoy (TGP)
  1. Roy Ordinario
  2. Antonio Anastacio
  3. Jennifer Ann Munar
  4. Marwin Archie Millare
  5. Henry de Castro
  6. Rodolfo Lacuna
46. **Magdalo para sa Pilipino (Magdalo)**
  1. **Gary Alejano** (incumbent)
  2. Francisco Ashley Acedillo (incumbent)
  3. Manuel Cabochan
  4. Billy Pascua
  5. Christopher Orongan
47. OFW Family Club (OFWFC)
  1. Roy Señeres Jr.
  2. Golda Hannah Isadora Francsico
  3. Jose Olinares Jr.
  4. Celerino Umandap
  5. Felix Landicho Jr.
48. Association of Laborers and Employees (ALE)
  1. Catalina Bagasina
  2. Roque Lumanlan
  3. Jasmin Yumul
  4. Faridah Lomondot
  5. Yvette Albaniel
49. Ating Guro
  1. Benjo Basas
  2. Jose Emery Roble
  3. Arsenio Jallorina
  4. Raquel Castillo
  5. Juanito Dona Jr.
50. Alliance of Volunteer Educators (AVE)
  1. Eulogio Magsaysay (incumbent)
  2. Guillerma Limboc
  3. Jose Baesa
  4. Alicia Diel
  5. Nicolas Braña
51. **Advocacy for Teacher Empowerment through Action, Cooperation and Harmony Towards Educational Reforms (A Teacher, Inc.)**
  1. **Julieta Cortuna** (incumbent)
  2. Nenita Habulan
  3. Elizabeth Saldivar
  4. Ma. Victoria Umali
  5. Mary Grace Villanueva
52. **Anakpawis**
  1. **Ariel Casilao**
  2. Rafael V. Mariano
  3. Randall Echanis
  4. Jose Canlas
  5. Peter Gonzales
  6. Gloria Arellano
  7. Jaime Paglinawan Sr.
53. Rebolusyonaryong Alyansang Makabansa (RAM)
  1. Danilo Lim
  2. Jose Arturo Garcia Jr.
  3. Proceso Maligalig
  4. Alexander Noble
  5. Melvin Contapay
54. Construction Workers Solidarity (CWS)
  1. Evelyn Catherine Silagon
  2. Crispin Soriano Jr.
  3. Vicente Puerta
55. **Kabataan**
  1. **Sarah Elago**
  2. Romina Raiselle Astudillo
  3. Vennel Francis Chenfoo
  4. Deo Montesclaros
  5. Charmane Chin
56. Piston Land Transport Coalition (Piston)
  1. George San Mateo
  2. Gregory Perez
  3. Edgardo Salarda
  4. Charito Juranes
  5. Eduardo Lazaro
  6. Ma. Felicidad Celestina Floranda
57. **Trade Union Congress Party (TUCP)**
  - First list:
    1. Roland dela Cruz
    2. Ernesto Herrera II
    3. Arturo Basea
    4. Reynaldo Santos
    5. Gregorio del Prado
    6. Florencia Cabatingan
  - Second list:
    1. **Raymond Mendoza** (incumbent)
    2. Cabaua Loreta Jr.
    3. Michael Democrito Mendoza
    4. Arthur Juego
    5. Temisdocles Dejon Jr.
    6. Roa Recio
58. Advocacy for Social Empowerment and Nation Building through Easing Poverty (Kalinga)
  1. **Abigail Faye Ferriol** (incumbent)
  2. Irene Gay Saulog
  3. Uzziel Caponpon
  4. Michael Cruz
  5. Kemuel Quillao
59. **Ating Agapay Sentrong Samahan ng mga Obrero (Aasenso)**
  1. **Teodoro Montoro**
  2. Ferdinand Castro II
  3. Felix Cruz
  4. Rey Pabilona
  5. Eladio Gatmaitan
60. **Ang Asosasyon sang Mangunguma nga Bisaya Owa Mangunguma (AAMBIS-Owa)**
  1. **Sharon Garin** (incumbent)
  2. Apolinario Arnaiz Jr.
  3. Felix Flores
  4. Manuel Gilo
  5. James Garin
61. Ako An Bisaya (AAB)
  1. Rodolfo Tuazon
  2. Rebecca Francisco-Simbillo
  3. Dahn Greigor Uy
  4. Moises Tolentino Jr.
  5. Kate Rebadulla
62. **Abono**
  1. **Conrado Estrella III** (incumbent)
  2. **Vini Nola Ortega**
  3. Ronald Allan So
  4. Oftociano Manalo Jr.
  5. Jayson Cainglet
63. **Anak Mindanao (AMIN)**
  1. **Sitti Djalia Hataman**
  2. **Makmod Mending Jr.**
  3. Roelito Gawilan
  4. Kenneth Tagaro
  5. Rosalinda Baladji
  6. Abdulbashet Marangit
64. Alyansa ng mga Grupong Haligi ng Agham at Teknolohiya para sa Mamamayan (AGHAM)
  1. Angelo Palmones
  2. Leocadio Santiago Jr.
  3. Victoria Bartilet
  4. Manuel Austria Jr.
  5. Elizabeth Dumaran
65. Alliance for National Urban Poor Organizations Assembly (ANUPA)
  1. Pantaleon Morallos Sr.
  2. Evangeline Abejo
  3. Maria Luz Gerundio
  4. Miguelito Salgado
  5. Marianne Arguelles
  6. Robercito Falco
  7. Noriet Morillo
  8. Gerry Roxas
  9. Elma Ejar
  10. Rudy Bermeo
66. Disabled/Pilipinos with Disabilities (Disabled/PWD)
  1. Michael Barredo
  2. Teofilo dela Cruz Jr.
  3. Adeline Dumapong-Ancheta
  4. Ramon Emmanuel Ascue
  5. Manuel Agcaoili
67. Tinderong Pinoy Party (Tinderong Pinoy)
  1. Meldin Alfonso Roy
  2. Rey Roy
  3. Jordan Mijarez
  4. David Michael Gabriel
  5. Maximo Santos
68. Confederation of Savings and Loan Associations (Consla)
  1. Ricardo Nolasco Jr.
  2. King Collantes
  3. Thaddeus Estalilla
  4. Milagros Azanza
  5. Ronald Dominguez
69. **Coalition of Associations of Senior Citizens in the Philippines (Senior Citizens)** (Note: Francisco Datol Jr. and Milagros Magsaysay took office as Senior Citizens' representatives.)
  - First list:
    1. Plutarco Vazquez
    2. Amado Calderon
    3. Jaime Cruz
    4. Remigio Jabil
    5. Jeremias Castillon
  - Second list:
    1. Remedios Arquiza
    2. Lucas Pasiliao
    3. Ramon Orosa
    4. Myrna Manamtam
    5. Rolando Saguid
70. Migrante Sectoral Party of Overseas Filipinos and Their Families (Migrante)
  1. Garry Martinez
  2. Concepcion Bragas-Regalado
  3. Caridad Bachiller
  4. Flor Chan
  5. Estrelieta Bagasbas
71. Association of Marine Officer and Ratings (AMOR-Seaman)
  1. Crescenciano Elaba Jr.
  2. Cecilio Ver Panambo
  3. Remigio Serapio
  4. Jessie Baldesimo
  5. Rene Moron
72. **Citizens' Battle Against Corruption (CIBAC)**
  - First list:
    1. **Sherwin Tugna** (incumbent)
    2. Armi Jane Borje
    3. Calvin Ryan Coherco
    4. Virginia Jose
    5. Stanley Clyde Flores
  - Second list:
    1. Bibiano Rivera Jr.
    2. Augustine Vestil Jr.
    3. Jho Barry Miranda
    4. Jesus Emmanuel Vargas
    5. Richen Alaras
73. National Confederation of Tricycle Operators and Drivers Association of the Philippines (Nactodap)
  1. Ariel Lim
  2. Mariano Jose Villafuerte III
  3. Manolito Legaspi
  4. Aeneas Eli Diaz
  5. Reynante Vilos
  6. Eugenia Hingpit
  7. Jocelyn Magcale
74. Ang Tao Muna at Bayan (A Tambay)
  1. Ma. Concepcion Victorio
  2. Ameenah Fajardo
  3. Sheryl Fajardo
  4. Ameerah Fajardo
  5. Rodolfo Fabricante
75. Barangay Natin (BANAT)
  1. Salvador Britanico
  2. Patrick Ismael Baterina
  3. Isagani Lisaca
  4. Guillermo Alonso
  5. Rafael Monteclaro Jr.
76. Ugnayan ng Maralita Laban sa Kahirapan (Umalab Ka)
  1. Javier Zacate
  2. General Du
  3. Bernie Cruz
  4. Edgardo Edwin Segaya
  5. Rommel Zambrano
  6. Lejun dela Cruz
  7. Emily Cano
77. Abyan Ilonggo (A.I.)
  1. Rolex Suplico
  2. Diana Biron
  3. Francis Lavilla
  4. Maylene Villanueva
  5. Jonas Depalac
  6. Roberto de Asis
  7. Crisanne del Vargas
  8. Helen Lozada
  9. Marlyn Provindido
  10. Jerome Pabilona
78. **An Waray**
  1. **Victoria Isabel Noel** (incumbent)
  2. Raoul Creencia
  3. Patrick Aguilos
  4. Rhoda Radoc
  5. Nicolas Leaño
79. **Kusug Tausug**
  1. **Shernee Tan**
  2. Tita Samsuya
  3. Noreen Pallong
  4. Ahmad Ben Hamja
  5. Abdurahman Samson
80. Ang Nars
  1. Leah Paquiz (incumbent)
  2. Betty Merritt
  3. Grace Agustin
  4. Jenny-Ann Bernardo-Soriano
  5. Vilma Icoy
81. **Bayan Muna**
  1. **Carlos Isagani Zarate** (incumbent)
  2. Teodoro Casiño
  3. Hope Hervilla
  4. Marites Pielago
  5. Roman Polintan
  6. Alejandro Deoma
  7. Ferdinand Gundayao
82. Marino Samahan ng mga Seaman (Marino)
  1. Florence Alejandre
  2. Lorenzo Edwin Eusebio
  3. Rene Rizza Bernardo-Mamburam
  4. Christ Lamb Reae Vicente
  5. Laurence Umayan
83. Kasangga sa Kaunlaran (Ang Kasangga)
  1. Gabrielle Calizo-Quimpo
  2. Jose Perpetuo Lotilla
  3. Concordio Gorriceta
  4. Segundo Gaston
  5. Jose Ciceron Lorenzo Haresco
84. Aagapay sa Matatanda (AMA)
  1. Jeci Lapus
  2. Ramsey Ocampo
  3. Romeo Serrano
  4. Rene Pascual
  5. Jose Gloria
  6. Roel Deles
85. Kaagapay ng Nagkakaisang Agilang Pilipinong Magsasaka/Kabuhayan at Kabahayan ng mga Magsasaka (KAP/Kakasa-Ka)
  1. Leah Aurelio
  2. Benilda Flores
  3. Armando Javier
  4. Mary Anne Olayvar
  5. Alexander Trinidad
  6. Joji Anne Gerochi
86. Federation of International Cable TV and Telecommunications Association of the Philippines (Fictap)
  1. Estrellita Juliano-Tamano
  2. Cecilia Dy
  3. Antonio Silloriquez
  4. Alvin Ty
  5. Ruben Cortez
87. Sandigan ng mga Manggagawa sa Konstruksiyon (Samako)
  1. Enrique Olonan
  2. Vicente Besa
  3. Romeo Soria Jr.
  4. Rommel Malleta
  5. Enrique Barde
88. **Acts-Overseas Filipino Workers Coalition of Organizations (Acts-OFW)** (Note: Aniceto Bertiz III took office as Acts-OFW's representative.)
  1. Catherine Bamahrez
  2. Feliciano Adorna Jr.
  3. Noli Pacquiao
  4. Ernesto Maceda
  5. Edgardo Bajon
  6. Cynthia Agpalo
89. **Puwersa ng Bayaning Atleta (PBA)**
  1. **Mark Aeron Sambar**
  2. **Jericho Nograles**
  3. Allen Gayle Geronimo
  4. Ernanie Calica
  5. Cleve Denrick Geronimo
90. **Manila Teachers Savings and Loan Association (Manila Teachers)**
  1. **Virgilio Lacson**
  2. Paul Sembrano
  3. Gil Magbanua
  4. Asuncion Howe
  5. Angelita Alfante
  6. Jennifer Lacson
  7. Ma. Victoria Suarez
  8. Evelyn Dimagiba
  9. Ma. Veronica Pastrana
  10. Mila Pilapil
91. **Ang National Coalition of Indigenous Peoples Action Na! (ANAC-IP)**
  1. **Jose Panganiban Jr.**
  2. Nicole Pauline Dy
  3. Robert Simbahon
  4. Rizalino Segundo
  5. Emmanuel Bigornia
92. Abante Retirees
  1. Plaridel Abaya
  2. Raul Urgello
  3. Victor Ibrado
  4. Plaridel Garcia
  5. Aravela Ramos
93. **Butil Farmers Party (Butil)**
  1. **Cecilia Leonila Chavez**
  2. Isidoro Santos
  3. Wilfredo Antimano
  4. Prudencio Consolacion
  5. Miguel Luma-ang
  6. Leoncio Haber
94. Kapatirang Magmamais ng Pilipinas (Kamais Pilipinas)
  1. Roderico Bico
  2. Roger Navarro
  3. Isidro Acosta
  4. Rosalie Ellasus
  5. Susan Lao
95. Adhikaing Tinataguyod ng Kooperatiba (Ating Koop)
  - First list:
    1. Gloria Futalan
    2. Tirso Buenaventura
    3. Francis Loque
    4. Rodolfo Perez
    5. Amelito Revuelta
  - Second list:
    1. Roberto Mascariña (incumbent)
    2. Ronaldo Cajucom
    3. Jessie Tioaquen
    4. Elpidio Abela
    5. Erlinda Duque
    6. Amparo Rimas
96. Anti-Crime and Terrorism Community Involvement and Support (ACT-CIS)
  1. Maria Rosella Pagdilao
  2. Benjardi Mantele
  3. Victor Michael Carambas
  4. Robert Allan Arabejo
  5. Johnny Young
97. **1st Consumers Alliance for Rural Energy (1-CARE)**
  - First list:
    1. **Carlos Roman Uybarreta**
    2. Romeo Cuasay
    3. Conchito Oclarit
    4. Nolie Namocatcat
    5. Roman Araño
  - Second list:
    1. Edgardo Masongsong (incumbent)
    2. Salvador Cabaluna III
    3. Janeene Depay-Colingan
    4. Brigido Plaza Jr.
    5. Gerry Valdez
98. **Ang Mata'y Alagaan (MATA)**
  1. **Tricia Nicole Velasco-Catera**
  2. Joel Go
  3. Emmanuel Regio
  4. Divina Pinlac
  5. Karl Seven Co
99. Dumper Philippines Taxi Drivers Association (Dumper PTDA)
  1. Fermin Octobre
  2. James Bolinao
  3. Edwin Edrolin
  4. Rodrigo Baculado
  5. Cirilo Gaballo
100. **Bagong Henerasyon (BH (Bagong Henerasyon))**
  1. **Bernadette Herrera**
  2. Gerardo Panghulan
  3. Jose Castigador
  4. Katherine Rose Gancayco
  5. Rochelle Custodio
101. Partido Manggagawa (PM)
  1. Rene Magtubo
  2. Rufino Gonzaga Jr.
  3. Gerardo Rivera
  4. Bayani Diwa
  5. Judy Ann Miranda
102. **Social Amelioration and Genuine Intervention on Poverty (1-SAGIP)**
  1. **Rodante Marcoleta**
  2. Erlinda Santiago (incumbent)
  3. Lloyd Qujada
  4. Rogelio Carbo
  5. Kristoffer James Purisima
  6. Vic Lacaya III
  7. Jose Noel Bactad
  8. Angelito Principio
  9. Aileen Alvarez
103. Isang Pangarap ng Bahay sa Bagong Buhay ng Maralitang Kababayan (1-Pabahay)
  1. Nereo Raymundo Joaquin Jr.
  2. Kenway Tan
  3. Grace Baria
  4. Lucia Milagros Tecson
  5. Fernando Rodolfo
104. Cancer Alleviation Network on Care, Education and Rehabilitation (Cancer)
  1. Dario Lapada Jr.
  2. Emerito Rojas
  3. Ryan Vincent Uy
  4. Nelia Abrogar
  5. Rhodora Marmito
105. Mamamayan Tungo sa Maunland na Pilipinas (MTM PHILS)
  - First list:
    1. Medardo Custodio
    2. Renato Uy
    3. Felicisimo Bautista
    4. Pacifico Briones Jr.
    5. Aristarco Navarrete
    6. Ramon Nava
  - Second list:
    1. Araceli Domingo
    2. Agapito Pacorsa Jr.
    3. Violeta Bonilla
    4. Mohammad Abdulwatan
    5. Daisy Jacinto
106. Isang Alyansang Aalalay sa Pinoy Skilled Workers (1-Aalalay)
  1. Michael Mendoza
  2. Enrico Miguel Sanchez
  3. Reynaldo de Leon
  4. Joseph Jalbuna
  5. Kevin Joseph Endaya
107. **Aangat Tayo**
  1. **Neil Abayon**
  2. Cesar Montano
  3. Gizelle Lou Cabahug-Fugoso
  4. Silvino Sumagaysay Jr.
  5. Neil Esponilla
  6. Jean Bautista
  7. Josephine Gutierrez
  8. Elizer Unay
108. Abante Mindanao (Abamin)
  1. Jocelyn Rodriguez
  2. Virginia Sering
  3. Dionisio Caballero
  4. Sergio Firmacion II
  5. Erlinda Oras
109. Ang Prolife
  1. Moises Cañete
  2. Fritz Daulo
  3. Jan Louenn Lumanta
  4. Julius Engbino
  5. Lareina Lea Manalang-Garcia
110. **Buhay Hayaan Yumabong (Buhay)**
  1. **Mike Velarde Jr.** (incumbent)
  2. **Lito Atienza** (incumbent)
  3. Melquiades Robles
  4. Francisco Xavier Padilla
  5. Primitivo Chua
  6. Melchor Monsod
111. Append
  1. Pablo Nava III (incumbent)
  2. Eduardo Jimenez
  3. Alex Patio
  4. Virginia Juan
  5. Narciso San Miguel
112. Katipunan ng mga Guardians Brotherhood (KGB)
  1. Mario Cerilles Jr.
  2. Felipe Favila
  3. Dunga Lim
  4. Rodolfo Tual
  5. Carlos Matas
113. **Agbiag! Timpuyog Ilocano (Agbiag!)** (Note: Patricio Antonio took office as Agbiag's representative.)
  1. Michaelina Antonio
  2. Ma. Dorothea Gancayco
  3. Jorge Sales
  4. Bibiana Trinidad
  5. Nida Cagurangan
114. Awareness of Keepers of the Environment
  1. Edgar Lopez
  2. Ma. Luna Caluag
  3. Angelina Salas
  4. Ralph Barin
  5. Michael Molino
115. Allied Movement Employment Protection Assistance for Overseas Filipino Workers Access Center (AMEPA OFW)
  1. Saleh Abdullah
  2. Michael Kida
  3. Apolonio Mayuga
  4. Samuel Carbajosa
  5. Abdullatip Abubakar
