= Jeffrey Soriano =

Filipino politician (born 1980)

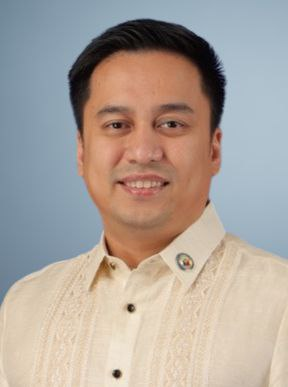
- Official portrait, 2025

Member of the House of Representatives of the Philippines for the ACT-CIS Partylist
- Incumbent
- Assumed office March 11, 2026 Serving with Jocelyn Tulfo
- In office June 30, 2022 – February 22, 2023 Serving with Jocelyn Tulfo and Edvic Yap

Personal details
- Born: August 22, 1980 (age 46) Manila, Philippines

Jeffrey Soriano (born August 22, 1980) is a Filipino politician serving as a Representative of the ACT-CIS Partylist in the House of Representatives of the Philippines. He is also the Secretary-General of the organization.

He has served multiple terms as a representative for the ACT-CIS Party-list. He initially held the position from 2022 until his resignation in 2023. He subsequently took his Oath of Office again under the same partylist in March 11, 2026 in the 20th Congress (2025-2028).^{[}

Soriano has been associated with legislative initiatives concerning infrastructure development, governance reform, and social welfare policy.

== Legislative Career ==
20th Congress: Following the 2025 national elections, ACT-CIS secured two congressional seats. Soriano, as the party's third nominee, was proclaimed by the COMELEC on March 4, 2026, to fill the vacancy left by former Congressman Edvic Yap, who resigned.

19th Congress: Soriano previously served as a representative starting in 2022. During this term, he held the position of Assistant Majority Leader and was a vice-chairperson for multiple committees, including Rules and Energy. He resigned his post in February 2023 for undisclosed reasons. He was then replaced by now-Senator Erwin Tulfo.

== Committee Memberships ==
Soriano served as a member of several House committees during the 19th Congress (2022-2023), including the Committees on Rules (where he also served as the Assistant Majority Leader), Energy, Good Government and Public Accountability, Ways and Means, Transportation, People’s Participation, Economic Affairs, and Housing and Urban Development.

== Electoral history ==
Electoral history of Jeffrey Soriano
Year	Office	Party	Votes received				Result
Year	Office	Party	Total	%	P.	Swing	Result
2019	Representative (Party-list)	ACT-CIS	2,651,987	9.51%	1st	—N/a	Won three seats, but did not take office
2022	Representative (Party-list)	ACT-CIS	2,111,091	5.80%	1st	-3.71	Won
2025	Representative (Party-list)	ACT-CIS	1,239,930	3.13%	4th	-2.67	Won
