= Philippine House Committee on Transportation =

Standing committee of the House of Representatives of the Philippines

Committee on Transportation
- 20th Congress

History
- New session started: To convene on July 28, 2025

Leadership
- Chairman: Vacant
- Minority Leader: Vacant

Website
- Committee on Transportation

The Philippine House Committee on Transportation, or House Transportation Committee is a standing committee of the Philippine House of Representatives.

== Jurisdiction ==
As prescribed by House Rules, the committee's jurisdiction is on land, sea, and air transportation and all public utilities and services connected thereto. This includes the establishment, operation, management, and regulation of seaports, airports, and other mass transportation systems including:

- Air transport agreements;
- Air transport security;
- Ballast water management;
- Civil aviation;
- Light and heavy rail systems and roll on - roll off systems (RO-RO);
- Maritime liens;
- Maritime security;
- Ship financing;
- Ship mortgage;
- Transportation related insurance; and
- Transportation safety standards.

== Members, 20th Congress ==
As of June 30, 2025, all committee membership positions are vacant until the House convenes for its first regular session on July 28.

== Historical membership rosters ==
=== 18th Congress ===
Position	Members	Party	Province/City	District
Chairperson	Edgar Mary Sarmiento	NUP	Samar	1st
Vice Chairpersons	Julienne Baronda	NUP	Iloilo City	Lone
Vice Chairpersons	John Reynald Tiangco	Partido Navoteño	Navotas	Lone
Vice Chairpersons	Carmelo Lazatin II	PDP–Laban	Pampanga	1st
Vice Chairpersons	Eleandro Jesus Madrona	Nacionalista	Romblon	Lone
Vice Chairpersons	Gavini Pancho	NUP	Bulacan	2nd
Vice Chairpersons	Claudine Diana Bautista	Dumper-PTDA	Party-list	
Vice Chairpersons	Carlo Lisandro Gonzalez	MARINO	Party-list	
Vice Chairpersons	Manuel Zubiri	Bukidnon Paglaum	Bukidnon	3rd
Vice Chairpersons	Dale Malapitan	PDP–Laban	Caloocan	1st
Vice Chairpersons	Romeo Momo Sr.	CWS	Party-list	
Vice Chairpersons	Aloysia Lim	RAM	Party-list	
Vice Chairpersons	Romulo Peña Jr.	Liberal	Makati	1st
Vice Chairpersons	Jose Gay Padiernos	GP	Party-list	
Vice Chairpersons	Ramon Guico III	Lakas	Pangasinan	5th
Vice Chairpersons	Florida Robes	NUP	San Jose del Monte	Lone
Members for the Majority	Rozzano Rufino Biazon	PDP–Laban	Muntinlupa	Lone
Members for the Majority	Junie Cua	PDP–Laban	Quirino	Lone
Members for the Majority	Elisa Kho	PDP–Laban	Masbate	2nd
Members for the Majority	Eric Olivarez	PDP–Laban	Parañaque	1st
Members for the Majority	Joel Mayo Almario	PDP–Laban	Davao Oriental	2nd
Members for the Majority	Eric Martinez	PDP–Laban	Valenzuela	2nd
Members for the Majority	Francisco Jose Matugas II	PDP–Laban	Surigao del Norte	1st
Members for the Majority	Rogelio Pacquiao	PDP–Laban	Sarangani	Lone
Members for the Majority	Marisol Panotes	PDP–Laban	Camarines Norte	2nd
Members for the Majority	Leonardo Babasa Jr.	PDP–Laban	Zamboanga del Sur	2nd
Members for the Majority	Antonino Calixto	PDP–Laban	Pasay	Lone
Members for the Majority	Jumel Anthony Espino	PDP–Laban	Pangasinan	2nd
Members for the Majority	Faustino Michael Carlos Dy III	PFP	Isabela	5th
Members for the Majority	Arnulf Bryan Fuentebella	NPC	Camarines Sur	4th
Members for the Majority	Manuel Luis Lopez	NPC	Manila	1st
Members for the Majority	Gerardo Valmayor Jr.	NPC	Negros Occidental	1st
Members for the Majority	Carlito Marquez	NPC	Aklan	1st
Members for the Majority	Ciriaco Gato Jr.	NPC	Batanes	Lone
Members for the Majority	Wilfrido Mark Enverga	NPC	Quezon	1st
Members for the Majority	Genaro Alvarez Jr.	NPC	Negros Occidental	6th
Members for the Majority	Weslie Gatchalian	NPC	Valenzuela	1st
Members for the Majority	Michael John Duavit	NPC	Rizal	1st
Members for the Majority	Carlos Cojuangco	NPC	Tarlac	1st
Members for the Majority	Lorna Bautista-Bandigan	NPC	Davao Occidental	Lone
Members for the Majority	Strike Revilla	NUP	Cavite	2nd
Members for the Majority	Faustino Dy V	NUP	Isabela	6th
Members for the Majority	Micaela Violago	NUP	Nueva Ecija	2nd
Members for the Majority	Juliette Uy	NUP	Misamis Oriental	2nd
Members for the Majority	Rolando Valeriano	NUP	Manila	2nd
Members for the Majority	Jose Ong Jr.	NUP	Northern Samar	2nd
Members for the Majority	Jose Tejada	Nacionalista	Cotabato	3rd
Members for the Majority	Frederick Siao	Nacionalista	Iligan	Lone
Members for the Majority	Joaquin Chipeco Jr.	Nacionalista	Calamba	Lone
Members for the Majority	Eric Yap	ACT-CIS	Party-list	
Members for the Majority	Fernando Cabredo	PDP–Laban	Albay	3rd
Members for the Majority	Gerardo Espina Jr.	Lakas	Biliran	Lone
Members for the Majority	Alan 1 Ecleo	PDP–Laban	Dinagat Islands	Lone
Members for the Majority	Edcel Lagman	Liberal	Albay	1st
Members for the Majority	Anthony Peter Crisologo	NUP	Quezon City	1st
Members for the Majority	Narciso Bravo Jr.	NUP	Masbate	NUP
Members for the Majority	Alfredo Garbin Jr.	AKO BICOL	Party-list	
Members for the Majority	Alfelito Bascug	NUP	Agusan del Sur	1st
Members for the Majority	Luisa Lloren Cuaresma	NUP	Nueva Vizcaya	Lone
Members for the Majority	Hector Sanchez	Lakas	Catanduanes	Lone
Members for the Majority	Sabiniano Canama	COOP-NATCCO	Party-list	
Members for the Majority	Michael Edgar Aglipay	DIWA	Party-list	
Members for the Majority	Macnell Lusotan	MARINO	Party-list	
Members for the Majority	Shirlyn Bañas-Nograles	PDP–Laban	South Cotabato	1st
Members for the Majority	Precious Castelo	NPC	Quezon City	2nd
Members for the Majority	Shernee Tan	Kusug Tausug	Party-list	
Members for the Majority	Eugenio Angelo Barba	Nacionalista	Ilocos Norte	2nd
Members for the Majority	Rodolfo Ordanes	SENIOR CITIZENS	Party-list	
Members for the Minority	Gabriel Bordado Jr.	Liberal	Camarines Sur	3rd
Members for the Minority	Sergio Dagooc	APEC	Party-list	
Members for the Minority	Isagani Amatong	Liberal	Zamboanga del Norte	3rd
Members for the Minority	Ferdinand Gaite	Bayan Muna	Party-list	
Members for the Minority	Arlene Brosas	GABRIELA	Party-list	
Members for the Minority	Arnolfo Teves Jr.	PDP–Laban	Negros Oriental	3rd
Members for the Minority	Irene Gay Saulog	KALINGA	Party-list	

==== Member for the Majority ====
- Francisco Datol Jr. (Note: Died on August 10, 2020.) (SENIOR CITIZENS)

== See also ==
- House of Representatives of the Philippines
- List of Philippine House of Representatives committees
- Department of Transportation
