= Philippine House Special Committee on Flagship Programs and Projects =

Special committee of the House of Representatives of the Philippines

Special Committee on Flagship Programs and Projects
- 20th Congress

History
- New session started: July 28, 2025

Leadership
- Chair: Jose Arturo Garcia Jr., NPC since July 30, 2025
- Minority Leader: Vacant since June 30, 2025

Website
- Special Committee on Flagship Programs and Projects

The Philippine House Special Committee on Flagship Programs and Projects is a special committee of the Philippine House of Representatives.

== Jurisdiction ==
The committee's jurisdiction is on the monitoring, evaluation and review of highly-strategic infrastructure or programs and projects identified and approved by the National Economic and Development Authority (NEDA) Board Committee on Infrastructure and/or the Investment Coordination Committee and included in the General Appropriations Act, including to propose possible game-changing and high-impact flagship programs and projects and the necessity of recommending requisite courses of action in relation thereto.

== Members, 20th Congress ==
Position	Member	Constituency	Party
Chairperson	Jose Arturo Garcia Jr.	Rizal–3rd	NPC
Vice Chairpersons	Vacant		
Members for the Majority	Vacant		
Members for the Minority	Vacant		

== Historical membership rosters ==
=== 18th Congress ===
Position	Members	Party	Province/City	District
Chairperson	Carlos Cojuangco	NPC	Tarlac	1st
Vice Chairpersons	Gavini Pancho	NUP	Bulacan	2nd
Vice Chairpersons	Carmelo Lazatin II	PDP–Laban	Pampanga	1st
Vice Chairpersons	Cesar Jimenez Jr.	PDP–Laban	Zamboanga City	1st
Vice Chairpersons	Kristine Singson-Meehan	Bileg Ti Ilokano	Ilocos Sur	2nd
Members for the Majority	Rudy Caoagdan	PDP–Laban	Cotabato	2nd
Members for the Majority	Ansaruddin Abdul Malik Adiong	Nacionalista	Lanao del Sur	1st
Members for the Majority	Mark Go	Nacionalista	Baguio	Lone
Members for the Majority	Ed Christopher Go	Nacionalista	Isabela	2nd
Members for the Majority	Michael Gorriceta	Nacionalista	Iloilo	2nd
Members for the Majority	Carl Nicolas Cari	PFP	Leyte	5th
Members for the Majority	Yasser Balindong	Lakas	Lanao del Sur	2nd
Members for the Majority	Shirlyn Bañas-Nograles	PDP–Laban	South Cotabato	1st
Members for the Majority	Tyrone Agabas	NPC	Pangasinan	6th
Members for the Majority	Edgar Erice	Liberal	Caloocan	2nd
Members for the Majority	Romulo Peña Jr.	Liberal	Makati	1st
Members for the Majority	Emmanuel Billones	Liberal	Capiz	1st
Members for the Majority	Adriano Ebcas	AKO PADAYON	Party-list	
Members for the Majority	Michael Defensor	ANAKALUSUGAN	Party-list	
Members for the Majority	Eric Yap	ACT-CIS	Party-list	
Members for the Majority	Jose Antonio Sy-Alvarado	NUP	Bulacan	1st
Members for the Majority	Vincent Franco Frasco	Lakas	Cebu	5th
Members for the Majority	Rashidin Matba	PDP–Laban	Tawi-Tawi	Lone
Members for the Majority	Princess Rihan Sakaluran	NUP	Sultan Kudarat	1st
Members for the Majority	Wilfredo Caminero	NUP	Cebu	2nd
Members for the Majority	Roger Mercado	Lakas	Southern Leyte	Lone
Members for the Majority	Micaela Violago	NUP	Nueva Ecija	2nd

== See also ==
- House of Representatives of the Philippines
- List of Philippine House of Representatives committees
