= Philippine House Committee on Public Works and Highways =

Standing committee of the House of Representatives of the Philippines

Committee on Public Works and Highways
- 20th Congress

History
- New session started: To convene on July 28, 2025

Leadership
- Chairman: Vacant
- Minority Leader: Vacant

Website
- Committee on Public Works and Highways

The Philippine House Committee on Public Works and Highways, or House Public Works and Highways Committee is a standing committee of the Philippine House of Representatives.

== Jurisdiction ==
As prescribed by House Rules, the committee's jurisdiction is on the planning, construction, maintenance, improvement and repair of public infrastructure which includes the following:

- Buildings
- Bridges
- Drainage
- Highways
- Flood control and protection
- Parks
- Roads
- Water utilities and utilization of waters of the public domain

== Members, 20th Congress ==
As of June 30, 2025, all committee membership positions are vacant until the House convenes for its first regular session on July 28.

== Historical membership rosters ==
=== 18th Congress ===
Position	Members	Party	Province/City	District
Chairperson	Eleandro Jesus Madrona	Nacionalista	Romblon	Lone
Vice Chairpersons	Romeo Momo Sr.	CWS	Party-list	
Vice Chairpersons	Alfred Delos Santos	ANG PROBINSYANO	Party-list	
Vice Chairpersons	Luisa Lloren Cuaresma	NUP	Nueva Vizcaya	Lone
Vice Chairpersons	Michael Gorriceta	Nacionalista	Iloilo	2nd
Vice Chairpersons	Eugenio Angelo Barba	Nacionalista	Ilocos Norte	2nd
Vice Chairpersons	Jonathan Keith Flores	PDP–Laban	Bukidnon	2nd
Vice Chairpersons	Joseph Lara	PDP–Laban	Cagayan	3rd
Vice Chairpersons	Anthony Peter Crisologo	NUP	Quezon City	1st
Vice Chairpersons	Cesar Jimenez Jr.	PDP–Laban	Zamboanga City	1st
Vice Chairpersons	Maricel Natividad-Nagaño	PRP	Nueva Ecija	4th
Vice Chairpersons	Adriano Ebcas	AKO PADAYON	Party-list	
Vice Chairpersons	Roger Mercado	Lakas	Southern Leyte	Lone
Members for the Majority	Resurreccion Acop	NUP	Antipolo	2nd
Members for the Majority	Leo Rafael Cueva	NUP	Negros Occidental	2nd
Members for the Majority	Strike Revilla	NUP	Cavite	2nd
Members for the Majority	Rashidin Matba	PDP–Laban	Tawi-Tawi	Lone
Members for the Majority	Alfelito Bascug	NUP	Agusan del Sur	1st
Members for the Majority	Samantha Louise Vargas-Alfonso	NUP	Cagayan	2nd
Members for the Majority	Antonio Albano	NUP	Isabela	1st
Members for the Majority	Juliette Uy	NUP	Misamis Oriental	2nd
Members for the Majority	Faustino Dy V	NUP	Isabela	6th
Members for the Majority	Jose Tejada	Nacionalista	Cotabato	3rd
Members for the Majority	Ramon Guico III	Lakas	Pangasinan	5th
Members for the Majority	Frederick Siao	Nacionalista	Iligan	Lone
Members for the Majority	Allen Jesse Mangaoang	Nacionalista	Kalinga	Lone
Members for the Majority	Mark Go	Nacionalista	Baguio	Lone
Members for the Majority	Maximo Dalog Jr.	Nacionalista	Mountain Province	Lone
Members for the Majority	Mario Vittorio Mariño	Nacionalista	Batangas	5th
Members for the Majority	Eduardo Gullas	Nacionalista	Cebu	1st
Members for the Majority	Joseph Sto. Niño Bernos	Nacionalista	Abra	Lone
Members for the Majority	Arnold Celeste	Nacionalista	Pangasinan	1st
Members for the Majority	Jeffrey Khonghun	Nacionalista	Zambales	1st
Members for the Majority	Jocelyn Fortuno	Nacionalista	Camarines Sur	5th
Members for the Majority	Teodorico Haresco Jr.	Nacionalista	Aklan	2nd
Members for the Majority	Abdulmunir Arbison	Nacionalista	Sulu	2nd
Members for the Majority	Ansaruddin Abdul Malik Adiong	Nacionalista	Lanao del Sur	1st
Members for the Majority	Ed Christopher Go	Nacionalista	Isabela	2nd
Members for the Majority	Eric Martinez	PDP–Laban	Valenzuela	2nd
Members for the Majority	Leonardo Babasa Jr.	PDP–Laban	Zamboanga del Sur	2nd
Members for the Majority	Carl Nicolas Cari	PFP	Leyte	5th
Members for the Majority	Janice Salimbangon	NUP	Cebu	4th
Members for the Majority	Dulce Ann Hofer	PDP–Laban	Zamboanga Sibugay	2nd
Members for the Majority	Ramon Nolasco Jr.	NUP	Cagayan	1st
Members for the Majority	Joselito Sacdalan	PDP–Laban	Cotabato	1st
Members for the Majority	Joy Myra Tambunting	NUP	Parañaque	2nd
Members for the Majority	Samier Tan	PDP–Laban	Sulu	1st
Members for the Majority	John Marvin Nieto	NUP	Manila	3rd
Members for the Majority	Ma. Angelica Amante-Matba	PDP–Laban	Agusan del Norte	2nd
Members for the Majority	Alan Dujali	PDP–Laban	Davao del Norte	2nd
Members for the Majority	Elisa Kho	PDP–Laban	Masbate	2nd
Members for the Majority	Henry Villarica	PDP–Laban	Bulacan	4th
Members for the Majority	Gerardo Espina Jr.	Lakas	Biliran	Lone
Members for the Majority	Jumel Anthony Espino	PDP–Laban	Pangasinan	2nd
Members for the Majority	Wilton Kho	PDP–Laban	Masbate	3rd
Members for the Majority	Ma. Fe Abunda	PDP–Laban	Eastern Samar	Lone
Members for the Majority	Eric Yap	ACT-CIS	Party-list	
Members for the Majority	Rommel Rico Angara	LDP	Aurora	Lone
Members for the Majority	Edgar Mary Sarmiento	NUP	Samar	1st
Members for the Majority	Fernando Cabredo	PDP–Laban	Albay	3rd
Members for the Majority	Solomon Chungalao	NPC	Ifugao	Lone
Members for the Majority	Princess Rihan Sakaluran	NUP	Sultan Kudarat	1st
Members for the Majority	Tyrone Agabas	NPC	Pangasinan	6th
Members for the Majority	Erico Aristotle Aumentado	NPC	Bohol	2nd
Members for the Majority	Elias Bulut Jr.	NPC	Apayao	Lone
Members for the Majority	Carlos Cojuangco	NPC	Tarlac	1st
Members for the Majority	Greg Gasataya	NPC	Bacolod	Lone
Members for the Majority	Ciriaco Gato Jr.	NPC	Batanes	Lone
Members for the Majority	Carlito Marquez	NPC	Aklan	1st
Members for the Majority	Manuel Sagarbarria	NPC	Negros Oriental	2nd
Members for the Majority	Faustino Michael Carlos Dy III	PFP	Isabela	5th
Members for the Majority	Genaro Alvarez Jr.	NPC	Negros Occidental	6th
Members for the Majority	Jose Enrique Garcia III	NUP	Bataan	NUP
Members for the Majority	Datu Roonie Sinsuat Sr.	PDP–Laban	Maguindanao	1st
Members for the Majority	Presley De Jesus	PHILRECA	Party-list	
Members for the Majority	Yasser Balindong	Lakas	Lanao del Sur	2nd
Members for the Majority	Florencio Noel	An Waray	Party-list	
Members for the Minority	Godofredo Guya	RECOBODA	Party-list	
Members for the Minority	Angelica Natasha Co	BHW	Party-list	
Members for the Minority	Isagani Amatong	Liberal	Zamboanga del Norte	3rd
Members for the Minority	Stella Luz Quimbo	Liberal	Marikina	2nd
Members for the Minority	Arnolfo Teves Jr.	PDP–Laban	Negros Oriental	3rd
Members for the Minority	Sergio Dagooc	APEC	Party-list	

==== Vice Chairperson ====
- Francisco Datol Jr. (Note: Died on August 10, 2020.) (SENIOR CITIZENS)

==== Members for the Majority ====
- Marissa Andaya (Note: Died on July 5, 2020.) (Camarines Sur–1st, NPC)
- Bernardita Ramos (Note: Died on September 8, 2020.) (Sorsogon–2nd, NPC)

== See also ==
- House of Representatives of the Philippines
- List of Philippine House of Representatives committees
- Department of Public Works and Highways
