= Philippine House Committee on Overseas Workers Affairs =

Standing committee of the House of Representatives of the Philippines

Committee on Overseas Workers Affairs
- 20th Congress

History
- New session started: To convene on July 28, 2025

Leadership
- Chairman: Vacant
- Minority Leader: Vacant

Website
- Committee on Overseas Workers Affairs

The Philippine House Committee on Overseas Workers Affairs, or House Overseas Workers Affairs Committee is a standing committee of the Philippine House of Representatives.

== Jurisdiction ==
As prescribed by House Rules, the committee's jurisdiction is on the policies and programs which promote and protect the rights and welfare of Overseas Filipino Workers (OFWs) including their families.

== Members, 20th Congress ==
As of June 30, 2025, all committee membership positions are vacant until the House convenes for its first regular session on July 28.

== Historical membership rosters ==
=== 19th Congress ===
Position	Members	Party	Province/City	District
Chairperson	Ron P. Salo	Kabayan	Party-list	
Vice Chairpersons	Jocelyn Tulfo	ACT-CIS	Party-list	
Vice Chairpersons	Khymer Adan Olaso	Adelante Zamboanga Party	Zamboanga City	1st
Vice Chairpersons	Allan Ty	LPGMA	Party-list	
Vice Chairpersons	Christian Yap	NPC	Tarlac	2nd
Members for the Majority	Janette Garin	NUP	Iloilo	1st
Members for the Majority	Glona Labadlabad	PDP–Laban	Zamboanga del Norte	2nd
Members for the Majority	Geraldine Roman	Lakas	Bataan	1st
Members for the Majority	Julienne Baronda	NUP	Iloilo City	Lone
Members for the Majority	Carlo Lisandro Gonzalez	MARINO	Party-list	
Members for the Majority	Joseph Lara	PDP–Laban	Cagayan	3rd
Members for the Majority	Esmael Mangudadatu	PDP–Laban	Maguindanao	2nd
Members for the Majority	Emmarie Ouano-Dizon	PDP–Laban	Cebu	6th
Members for the Majority	Joselito Sacdalan	PDP–Laban	Cotabato	1st
Members for the Majority	Datu Roonie Sinsuat Sr.	PDP–Laban	Maguindanao	1st
Members for the Majority	Jesus Manuel Suntay	PDP–Laban	Quezon City	4th
Members for the Majority	Samier Tan	PDP–Laban	Sulu	1st
Members for the Majority	Henry Villarica	PDP–Laban	Bulacan	4th
Members for the Majority	Marisol Panotes	PDP–Laban	Camarines Norte	2nd
Members for the Majority	Josefina Tallado	PDP–Laban	Camarines Norte	1st
Members for the Majority	Jose Tejada	Nacionalista	Cotabato	3rd
Members for the Majority	Kristine Alexie Besas-Tutor	Nacionalista	Bohol	3rd
Members for the Majority	Ma. Lourdes Acosta-Alba	Bukidnon Paglaum	Bukidnon	1st
Members for the Majority	Eric Yap	ACT-CIS	Party-list	
Members for the Majority	Manuel Zamora	HNP	Davao de Oro	1st
Members for the Majority	Maricel Natividad-Nagaño	PRP	Nueva Ecija	4th
Member for the Minority	Ferdinand Gaite	Bayan Muna	Party-list	

==== Member for the Majority ====
- Nestor Fongwan (Note: Died on December 18, 2019.) (Benguet–Lone, PDP–Laban)

== See also ==
- House of Representatives of the Philippines
- List of Philippine House of Representatives committees
- Overseas Workers Welfare Administration
- Philippine Overseas Employment Administration
