= Philippine House Committee on Games and Amusements =

Standing committee of the House of Representatives of the Philippines

Committee on Games and Amusements
- 20th Congress

History
- New session started: To convene on July 28, 2025

Leadership
- Chairman: Vacant
- Minority Leader: Vacant

Website
- Committee on Games and Amusements

The Philippine House Committee on Games and Amusements, or House Games and Amusements Committee is a standing committee of the Philippine House of Representatives.

== Jurisdiction ==
As prescribed by House Rules, the committee's jurisdiction is on all forms and places of gambling.

== Members, 20th Congress ==
As of June 30, 2025, all committee membership positions are vacant until the House convenes for its first regular session on July 28.

== Historical membership rosters ==
=== 18th Congress ===
Position	Members	Party	Province/City	District
Chairperson	Joseph Sto. Niño Bernos	Nacionalista	Abra	Lone
Vice Chairpersons	Elpidio Barzaga Jr.	NUP	Cavite	4th
Vice Chairpersons	Rolando Valeriano	NUP	Manila	2nd
Vice Chairpersons	Ronnie Ong	ANG PROBINSYANO	Party-list	
Vice Chairpersons	Jumel Anthony Espino	PDP–Laban	Pangasinan	2nd
Vice Chairpersons	Joy Myra Tambunting	NUP	Parañaque	2nd
Vice Chairpersons	Florencio Noel	An Waray	Party-list	
Vice Chairpersons	Rudy Caoagdan	PDP–Laban	Cotabato	2nd
Vice Chairpersons	Sonny Lagon	Ako Bisaya	Party-list	
Vice Chairpersons	Eric Yap	ACT-CIS	Party-list	
Members for the Majority	Abraham Tolentino	NUP	Cavite	8th
Members for the Majority	Antonio Albano	NUP	Isabela	1st
Members for the Majority	Carlo Lisandro Gonzalez	MARINO	Party-list	
Members for the Majority	Claudine Diana Bautista	Dumper-PTDA	Party-list	
Members for the Majority	Manuel Zamora	HNP	Davao de Oro	1st
Members for the Majority	Rowena Niña Taduran	ACT-CIS	Party-list	
Members for the Majority	Allen Jesse Mangaoang	Nacionalista	Kalinga	Lone
Members for the Majority	Jocelyn Tulfo	ACT-CIS	Party-list	
Members for the Majority	Lorna Bautista-Bandigan	NPC	Davao Occidental	Lone
Members for the Majority	Juliet Marie Ferrer	NUP	Negros Occidental	4th
Members for the Majority	Lorna Silverio	NUP	Bulacan	3rd
Members for the Majority	Strike Revilla	NUP	Cavite	2nd
Members for the Majority	Horacio Suansing Jr.	NUP	Sultan Kudarat	2nd
Members for the Majority	Franz Alvarez	NUP	Palawan	1st
Members for the Majority	Antonino Calixto	PDP–Laban	Pasay	Lone
Members for the Majority	Paulino Salvador Leachon	PDP–Laban	Oriental Mindoro	1st
Members for the Majority	Rolando Uy	NUP	Cagayan de Oro	1st
Members for the Majority	Dale Malapitan	PDP–Laban	Caloocan	1st
Members for the Majority	Francisco Jose Matugas II	PDP–Laban	Surigao del Norte	1st
Members for the Majority	Eric Olivarez	PDP–Laban	Parañaque	1st
Members for the Majority	John Marvin Nieto	NUP	Manila	3rd
Members for the Majority	Ma. Theresa Collantes	PDP–Laban	Batangas	3rd
Members for the Majority	Jose Francisco Benitez	PDP–Laban	Negros Occidental	3rd
Members for the Majority	Sandra Eriguel	NUP	La Union	2nd
Members for the Majority	Jonathan Keith Flores	PDP–Laban	Bukidnon	2nd
Members for the Majority	Datu Roonie Sinsuat Sr.	PDP–Laban	Maguindanao	1st
Members for the Majority	Juan Fidel Felipe Nograles	Lakas	Rizal	2nd
Members for the Majority	Wilton Kho	PDP–Laban	Masbate	3rd
Members for the Majority	Lorenz Defensor	PDP–Laban	Iloilo	3rd
Members for the Majority	Rudys Caesar Fariñas I	Probinsyano Ako	Party-list	
Members for the Majority	Ramon Nolasco Jr.	NUP	Cagayan	1st
Members for the Majority	Jose Teves Jr.	TGP	Party-list	
Members for the Majority	Robert Ace Barbers	Nacionalista	Surigao del Norte	2nd
Members for the Majority	Enrico Pineda	1PACMAN	Party-list	
Members for the Majority	Virgilio Lacson	MANILA TEACHERS	Party-list	
Members for the Majority	Alberto Pacquiao	OFWFC	Party-list	
Members for the Majority	Shirlyn Bañas-Nograles	PDP–Laban	South Cotabato	1st
Members for the Majority	Tyrone Agabas	NPC	Pangasinan	6th
Members for the Majority	Joseph Lara	PDP–Laban	Cagayan	3rd
Members for the Majority	Ramon Guico III	Lakas	Pangasinan	5th
Members for the Majority	Rommel Rico Angara	LDP	Aurora	Lone
Members for the Majority	Maximo Dalog Jr.	Nacionalista	Mountain Province	Lone
Members for the Majority	Arnold Celeste	Nacionalista	Pangasinan	1st
Members for the Majority	Jose Antonio Sy-Alvarado	NUP	Bulacan	1st
Members for the Majority	Maricel Natividad-Nagaño	PRP	Nueva Ecija	4th
Members for the Majority	Luisa Lloren Cuaresma	NUP	Nueva Vizcaya	Lone
Members for the Minority	Arnolfo Teves Jr.	PDP–Laban	Negros Oriental	3rd
Members for the Minority	Irene Gay Saulog	KALINGA	Party-list	
Members for the Minority	Isagani Amatong	Liberal	Zamboanga del Norte	3rd
Members for the Minority	Gabriel Bordado Jr.	Liberal	Camarines Sur	3rd

==== Member for the Majority ====
- Francisco Datol Jr. (Note: Died on August 10, 2020.) (SENIOR CITIZENS)

== See also ==
- House of Representatives of the Philippines
- List of Philippine House of Representatives committees
- Philippine Amusement and Gaming Corporation
