= Edvic Yap =

Filipino politician (born 1977)

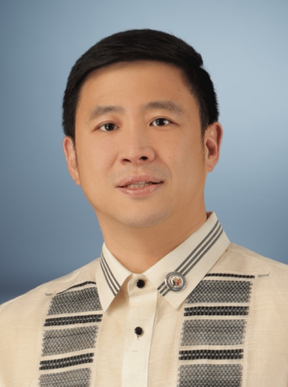
- Official portrait, 2025

Member of the House of Representatives of the Philippines for the ACT-CIS Partylist
- In office June 30, 2022 – February 4, 2026 Serving with Jocelyn Tulfo, Jeffrey Soriano (formerly) and Erwin Tulfo

Personal details
- Born: Edvic Go Yap; December 13, 1977 (age 48) Manila, Philippines
- Party: ACT-CIS (party-list; 2021–present)
- Spouse: Margie Basco
- Relations: Eric Yap (brother)

Edvic Go Yap (born December 13, 1977) is a Filipino politician and a former representative of the ACT-CIS Partylist to the House of Representatives of the Philippines from 2022 until his force resignation in 2026 due to corruption. He was a vice chairperson for the Good Government and Public Accountability committee and a was member for the majority for the Legislative Franchises and Public Accounts committees. He is one of the authors of the Universal Medical Access and Equipment Act.

== Early life ==
Edvic Go Yap was born on December 13, 1977, in Manila. Yap's siblings are Benguet congressman Eric Yap and Quezon City 4th district councilor Egay Yap. In 1997, Yap graduated with a degree in Commerce. Before his tenure as representative, he distributed goods for the COVID-19 pandemic.

== Political career ==
=== Congress (2022–2026) ===
During the wake of the 2022 Philippine presidential election, Yap suggested the next president should provide jobs to Filipinos. ACT-CIS Partylist gained 1st place in the 2022 Philippine party-list elections with 2,111,091 votes, 5.74 percent of the votes. Since Yap was the first nominee, he gained a seat in the House of Representatives of the Philippines. When he was representative, he principally authored 263 bills and co-authored 11. He is a vice chairperson for the Good Government and Public Accountability committee and a member for the majority for the Legislative Franchises and Public Accounts committees. On July 24, 2024, when the Marikina River overflowed, he prepared food packs for evacuees. On November 24, Yap and four other lawmakers filed a bill granting government employees a 10 percent discount on medicine. On February 5, 2025, Yap and five other lawmakers filed the Universal Medical Access and Equipment Act. In the 2025 Philippine party-list elections, he is running as the first nominee of ACT-CIS.

On February 4, 2026, Yap resigned as ACT-CIS partylist representative.

==== Flood control projects scandal ====
Edvic Yap and Eric Yap are implicated in the flood control projects corruption scandal. In October 2025, Ombudsman Jesus Crispin Remulla said that contractors Curlee and Sara Discaya sent money to Edvic Yap in 2019 or 2020. In December 2025, the Court of Appeals froze 280 bank accounts of Edvic Yap, Eric Yap, Silverwolves Construction Corporation, and Sky Yard Aviation Corporation over corruption allegations that ₱16 billion in projects were awarded to Silverwolves from 2022 to 2025, including funds that went to substandard or "ghost" projects in La Union and Davao Occidental.

== Personal life ==
Yap is married to Margie Basco.

== Electoral history ==
Electoral history of Edvic Yap
Year	Office	Party	Votes received				Result
Year	Office	Party	Total	%	P.	Swing	Result
2022	Representative (Party-list)	ACT-CIS	2,111,091	5.80%	1st	—N/a	Won
2025	Representative (Party-list)	ACT-CIS	1,239,930	3.13%	4th	-2.67	Won
