= Philippine House Committee on Legislative Franchises =

Standing committee of the House of Representatives of the Philippines

Committee on Legislative Franchises
- 20th Congress

History
- New session started: To convene on July 28, 2025

Leadership
- Chairman: Vacant
- Minority Leader: Vacant

Website
- Committee on Legislative Franchises

The Philippine House Committee on Legislative Franchises, or House Legislative Franchises Committee is a standing committee of the Philippine House of Representatives.

== Jurisdiction ==
As prescribed by House Rules, the committee's jurisdiction is on the grant, amendment, extension or revocation of franchises.

== Members, 20th Congress ==
As of June 30, 2025, all committee membership positions are vacant until the House convenes for its first regular session on July 28.

== Historical membership rosters ==
=== 19th Congress ===
Position	Members	Party	Province/City	District
Chairperson	Gus Tambunting	NUP	Parañaque	2nd
Vice Chairpersons	Horacio Suansing Jr.	NUP	Sultan Kudarat	2nd
Vice Chairpersons	Eleandro Jesus Madrona	Nacionalista	Romblon	Lone
Vice Chairpersons	Arthur Celeste	Nacionalista	Pangasinan	1st
Vice Chairpersons	Elpidio Barzaga Jr.	NUP	Cavite	4th
Vice Chairpersons	Mercedes Alvarez	NPC	Negros Occidental	6th
Vice Chairpersons	Johnny Pimentel	PDP-Laban	Surigao del Sur	2nd
Members for the Majority	Augustina Dominique Pancho	NUP	Bulacan	2nd
Members for the Majority	Miguel Luis Villafuerte	PDP-Laban	Camarines Sur	5th
Members for the Majority	Claude Bautista	Lakas	Davao Occidental	Lone
Members for the Majority	Vincent Garcia	Lakas	Davao City	2nd
Members for the Majority	Maricar Zamora	Lakas	Davao de Oro	1st
Members for the Majority	Claudine Diana Bautista	Dumper-PTDA	Party-list	
Members for the Majority	Edvic G. Yap	ACT-CIS	Party-list	
Members for the Majority	Eddiebong Plaza	NUP	Agusan del Sur	2nd
Members for the Majority	Ricardo S. Cruz, Jr.	Nacionalista	Taguig –Pateros	1st
Members for the Majority	Richelle Singson	Ako Ilocano Ako	Party-list	
Members for the Majority	Jose Aquino II	Lakas	Agusan del Norte	1st
Members for the Majority	Yasser A. Balindong	Lakas	Lanao del Sur	2nd
Members for the Majority	Antonieta R. Eudela	Lakas	Zamboanga Sibugay	2nd
Members for the Majority	Daphne Lagon	Lakas	Cebu	6th
Members for the Majority	Christian Unabia	Lakas	Misamis Oriental	1st
Members for the Majority	Francisco Jose Matugas II	Lakas	Surigao del Norte	1st
Members for the Majority	Patrick Michael Vargas	Lakas	Quezon City	5th
Members for the Majority	Nelson Dayanghirang	Nacionalista	Davao Oriental	1st
Members for the Majority	Lolita Javier	Nacionalista	Leyte	2nd
Members for the Majority	Michael Gorriceta	Nacionalista	Iloilo	2nd
Members for the Majority	Rolando Valeriano	NUP	Manila	2nd
Members for the Majority	Anthony Rolando Golez Jr.	Malasakit@Bayanihan	Party-list	
Members for the Majority	Jose Alvarez	PDP–Laban	Palawan	2nd
Members for the Majority	Ching B. Bernos	Nacionalista	Abra	Lone
Members for the Majority	Caroline Tanchay	Sagip	Party-list	
Members for the Majority	John Tracy Cagas	Nacionalista	Davao del Sur	Lone
Members for the Majority	Sonny Lagon	Ako Bisaya	Party-list	
Members for the Majority	Pablo John Garcia	NUP	Cebu	3rd
Members for the Majority	Antonio Ferrer	NUP	Cavite	6th
Members for the Majority	Luisa Lloren Cuaresma	Lakas	Nueva Vizcaya	Lone
Members for the Majority	Geraldine Roman	Lakas	Bataan	1st
Members for the Majority	Baby Aline Vargas-Alfonso	Lakas	Cagayan	2nd
Members for the Majority	Marlyn Alonte	Lakas	Biñan	Lone
Members for the Majority	Dean Asistio	Lakas	Caloocan	3rd
Members for the Majority	Ernesto M. Dionisio Jr.	Lakas	Manila	1st
Members for the Majority	Faustino A. Dy V	Lakas	Isabela	6th
Members for the Majority	Ian Paul Dy	Lakas	Isabela	3rd
Members for the Majority	Margarita Ignacia Nograles	PBA	Party-list	
Members for the Majority	Arnolfo Teves Jr.	NPC	Negros Oriental	3rd
Members for the Majority	Stella Luz Quimbo	Liberal	Marikina	2nd
Members for the Majority	Arjo Atayde	Nacionalista	Quezon City	1st
Members for the Majority	Joseph Gilbert Violago	NUP	Nueva Ecija	2nd
Members for the Majority	Edward Maceda	NPC	Manila	4th
Members for the Majority	Marjorie Ann Teodoro	UNA	Marikina	1st
Members for the Majority	James Ang Jr.	Uswag Ilonggo	Party-list	
Members for the Majority	Antonio B. Legarda Jr.	NPC	Antique	Lone
Members for the Majority	Jefferson Khonghun	Lakas	Zambales	1st
Members for the Majority	Elizaldy S. Co	AKO BICOL	Party-list	
Members for the Minority	Nicolas C. Enciso VIII	Bicol Saro	Party-list	
Members for the Minority	Ramon Rodrigo L. Gutierrez	1-Rider Partylist	Party-list	
Members for the Minority	Joseph Stephen Paduano	Abang Lingkod	Party-list	
Members for the Minority	JC Abalos	4Ps	Party-list	
Members for the Minority	Sergio Dagooc	APEC	Party-list	

== See also ==
- House of Representatives of the Philippines
- List of Philippine House of Representatives committees
- ABS-CBN franchise renewal controversy
- Meralco franchise renewal controversy
