= Marino Party List =

Marino
- — Philippine partylist —
- Full name: Marino Samahan ng mga Seaman, Inc.
- Sector(s) represented: Seafarer and maritime industry
- Founded: February 14, 2014; 12 years ago
- Colors: Blue

Current representation (19th Congress)
- Seats in the House of Representatives: 1 / 3 (Out of 63 party-list seats)
- Representative(s): Carlo Lisandro Gonzales

Website
- marino.org.ph

Marino Samahan ng mga Seaman (lit. 'Mariners, Association of Seamen'), Inc., also known as the Marino Party List, is a political organization with representation in the House of Representatives of the Philippines. It aims to represent the interest of Filipino seafarers and the maritime industry of the Philippines.

== History ==
The Marino Partylist was established on February 14, 2014. It sought representation in the House of Representatives' 18th Congress and ran in the 2019 elections. It competed with Ang Partido ng mga Pilipinong Marino (ANGKLA) as the representative partylist for Filipino seafarers in the Congress.

Marino Partylist secured two seats in the lower house of the Congress which were filled in by Carlo Lisandro Gonzales and Jose Antonio Lopez who are both business executives. Gonzales was vice president for Operations for Ulticon Builders and Lopez was involved with the Udenna Corporation of Dennis Uy. Lopez’s eligibility to hold office was disputed by a Pasig resident under the Party-list System Act alleging Lopez held American citizenship and/or permanent residency which would make him ineligible to be a partylist nominee. Lopez vacated the seat for personal reasons and was filled in by Macnell Lusotan in late 2019.

== Advocacy ==
The Marino Partylist's is oriented towards affairs related to Filipino seafarers and the maritime industry of the Philippines. It also leans towards the administration of President Rodrigo Duterte and is supportive of the president's maritime policy. The party has five named priority: cadet scholarships, family centers, trainings, free legal services and decentralization.

== Electoral history ==
Election	Votes	%	Seats
2016	102,430	0.32	0
2019	681,448	2.44	2
2022	530,382	1.44	1
2025	Did not participate		

== Representatives to Congress ==
Period	1st Representative	2nd Representative
18th Congress; 2019–2022	Carlo Lisandro Gonzales	Jose Antonio Lopez (2019)
18th Congress; 2019–2022	Carlo Lisandro Gonzales	Macnell Lusotan (2019–2022)
10th Congress; 2022–2025	Carlo Lisandro Gonzales	—N/a
Note: A party-list group, can win a maximum of three seats in the House of Representatives.
