= Jocelyn Tulfo =

Filipina politician

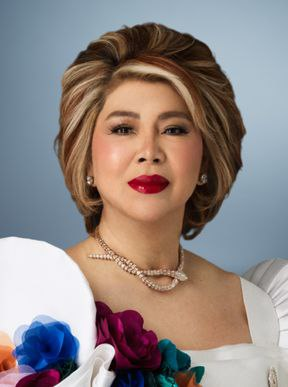
- Official portrait, 2025

Member of the Philippine House of Representatives for ACT-CIS Partylist
- Incumbent
- Assumed office June 30, 2019

Personal details
- Born: Jocelyn F. Pua; February 5, 1961 (age 65) Luna, Isabela, Philippines
- Party: ACT-CIS
- Spouse: Raffy Tulfo (m. 1993)
- Children: 2 (including Ralph)
- Education: Far Eastern University

Jocelyn Pua Tulfo (Tagalog: [ˈtulfo]; born Jocelyn F. Pua, February 5, 1961) is a Filipino politician who is a member of the Philippine House of Representatives for the ACT-CIS Partylist since 2019.

She is the wife of broadcaster and incumbent Senator Raffy Tulfo, with whom she had two wedding ceremonies: in 1993 at the Office of the Municipal Circuit Trial Court in Luna, Isabela, and in 1995 in Quezon City. Together, they have two children: Maricel, who also hosts her father's programs Wanted sa Radyo and Idol in Action, and Ralph, the incumbent representative of the 2nd district of Quezon City.

== Electoral history ==
Electoral history of Jocelyn Tulfo
| Year | Office | Party | Votes received | | | | Result |
| Year | Office | Party | Total | % | P. | Swing | Result |
|---|---|---|---|---|---|---|---|
| 2019 | Representative (Party-list) | ACT-CIS | 2,651,987 | 9.51% | 1st | —N/a | Won |
| 2022 | Representative (Party-list) | ACT-CIS | 2,111,091 | 5.80% | 1st | -3.71 | Won |
| 2025 | Representative (Party-list) | ACT-CIS | 1,239,930 | 3.13% | 4th | -2.67 | Won |
