= ACT-CIS Partylist =

Political organization in the Philippines

ACT-CIS
- — Philippine partylist —
- Full name: Anti-Crime and Terrorism Community Involvement and Support, Inc.
- Chairperson: Erwin Tulfo
- Secretary general: Jeffrey Soriano
- Type: Sectoral party
- Sector(s) represented: Multi-sector
- Slogan: Ang Partylist ng mga Inaapi (transl. The Partylist of the Oppressed)

Current representation (20th Congress)
- Seats in the House of Representatives: 2 / 3 (Out of 63 party-list seats)
- Representative(s): Jocelyn Tulfo; Jeffrey Soriano

The ACT-CIS Partylist (pronounced "act CIS"), officially the Anti-Crime and Terrorism Community Involvement and Support Inc., is a political organization which has party-list representation in the House of Representatives of the Philippines.

From 2013 to 2016, ACT-CIS was represented by former police officer Samuel Pagdilao. ACT-CIS returned to the House of Representatives in 2019, when it started to become associated with media personality brothers Erwin and Raffy Tulfo.

== History ==
At the 2013 elections, ACT-CIS received an endorsement from the Iglesia ni Cristo. The organization's seat was filled in by former police officer Samuel Pagdilao who had a platform against crime.

For the 2016 election, Samuel Pagdilao forewent from being included in the nominee list for ACT-CIS to run for Senator. The ACT-CIS nominee list is led by first-nominee samuel's wife Maria Rosella Pagdilao. ACT-CIS failed to secure any seat.

In 2019 election, ACT-CIS topped the party-list race with 2,651,987 votes. Sometime before the election, Eric Yap a friend of media personality Erwin Tulfo acquired ACT-CIS from Pagdilao. Since then the party became associated with Erwin, and his brother Raffy Tulfo.

ACT-CIS became the most voted party-list again in 2022.

== Political positions ==
ACT-CIS names the "oppressed and the abused" as the demographic it represents in the House of Representatives, and its platform focuses on crime prevention. It also claims to represent the indigent and Overseas Filipino Workers.

The organization supports the reinstatement of capital punishment in the Philippines, believing that executing convicts is an effective deterrence.

It also supported the administration of then-President Rodrigo Duterte, including his deadly war on drugs. Among the few policies of the Duterte administration that it opposed were the proposal to lower the minimum age of criminal responsibility and the Tax Reform for Acceleration and Inclusion Law.

== Electoral history ==
=== Electoral performance ===
Election	Votes	%	Party-list seats
2013	377,165	1.36%	2 / 58
2016	109,300	0.34%	0 / 59
2019	2,651,987	9.51%	3 / 61
2022	2,111,091	5.74%	3 / 63
2025	1,239,930	2.96%	2 / 63

=== Nominees ===
Election	Nominee	Position	Status	Ref.
2013	Jerome Oliveros	1st nominee	Withdrew	
2013	Manuel Pamaran	2nd nominee	Withdrew	
2013	Miguel Ortiz	3rd nominee	Withdrew	
2013	Samuel Pagdilao Jr.	Position unknown	1st representative	
2016	Maria Rosella Pagdilao	1st nominee	No seats won	
2016	Benjardi Mantele	2nd nominee	No seats won	
2016	Victor Michael Carambas	3rd nominee	No seats won	
2016	Robert Allan Arabejo	4th nominee	No seats won	
2016	Johnny Young	5th nominee	No seats won	
2019	Eric Yap	1st nominee	1st representative	
2019	Jocelyn Tulfo	2nd nominee	2nd representative	
2019	Rowena Niña Taduran	3rd nominee	3rd representative	
2019	Edgar Yap	4th nominee	Unused	
2019	Jeffrey Soriano	5th nominee	Unused	
2022	Edvic Yap	1st nominee	1st representative	
2022	Jocelyn Tulfo	2nd nominee	2nd representative	
2022	Jeffrey Soriano	3rd nominee	3rd representative (2022–2023; resigned)	
2022	Erwin Tulfo	4th nominee	3rd representative (2023–2025)	
2022	Effie Vanessa Ynson	5th nominee	Unused	
2025	Edvic Yap	1st nominee	1st representative (2025–2026; resigned)	
2025	Jocelyn Tulfo	2nd nominee	2nd representative	
2025	Jeffrey Soriano	3rd nominee	1st representative (since 2026)	
2025	Maria Ganda Yap	4th nominee		
2025	Eleanor Valerie So	5th nominee		

== Representatives to Congress ==
Period	1st representative	2nd representative	3rd representative
16th Congress; 2013–2016	Samuel Pagdilao Jr.	—N/a	—N/a
18th Congress; 2019–2022	Eric Yap (also ad-interim caretaker of Legislative district of Benguet)	Jocelyn Tulfo	Rowena Niña Taduran
19th Congress; 2022–2025	Edvic Yap	Jocelyn Tulfo	Jeffrey Soriano (2022–2023; resigned)
19th Congress; 2022–2025	Edvic Yap	Jocelyn Tulfo	Erwin Tulfo (2023–2025)
20th Congress; 2025–2028	Edvic Yap (2025–2026; resigned)	Jocelyn Tulfo	—N/a
20th Congress; 2025–2028	Jeffrey Soriano (2026–present)	Jocelyn Tulfo	—N/a

== Criticism ==
Election watchdog Kontra Daya claims that representation of marginalized groups is not a function that ACT-CIS serves given that the group's second nominee in 2019 Jocelyn Tulfo is the sister-in-law of Ramon Tulfo, the Philippine President's special envoy to China. She also has ties with former tourism secretary Wanda Tulfo Teo, who was implicated in allegations of an anomalous government transaction, according to Kontra Daya.
