= Nominees in the 2019 Philippine House of Representatives party-list election =

Wikimedia list article

The following are the nominees in the 2019 Philippine House of Representatives elections.

The elected party-lists and their nominees are in bold.

== Nominees ==
1. **Bayan Muna**
  1. **Carlos Isagani Zarate** (incumbent)
  2. **Ferdinand Gaite**
  3. **Eufemia Cullamat**
  4. Marites Pielago
  5. Maria Cristina Yambot
  6. Irma Espinosa
  7. Ma. Minerva Panopio
2. **Kabalikat ng Mamamayan (Kabayan)**
  1. **Ron Salo** (incumbent)
  2. Peter Anthony Abaya
  3. Paul Hernandez (incumbent)
  4. Noemie Bustamante
  5. Jennis Nidea
3. **Magkakasama sa Sakahan, Kaunlaran (Magsasaka)**
  1. **Argel Joseph Cabatbat**
  2. Soliman Villamin Sr.
  3. Oliver Corbito
  4. Joven Santos
  5. Manolito Dacuycoy
4. Philippine Educators Alliance for Community Empowerment (PEACE)
  1. Marie Paz Abante
  2. Zoilo Anat Jr.
  3. Emico Aurelio Torres
  4. Joy Ateneo Janobas
  5. Virlie Borreros
5. Nagkakaisang Pilipino para sa Pag-Angat ng Maralitang Manileño (Angat-Pinoy) (Note: Did not appear on the ballot.)
  1. Jose Zialcita
  2. Fatima Fara Macaraguit
  3. Jamel Macaraguit
  4. Felicitas Santiago
  5. Evelyn Ancheta
6. National Association for Electricity Consumers for Reforms (Kontra Brownout Partylist)
  1. Petronilo Ilagan
  2. Gertrudo de Leon
  3. Phillip Adviento
  4. Nelia Fuentebella-Gonzales
  5. Amor Co
7. **OFW Family Club (OFW Family)**
  1. **Bobby Pacquiao**
  2. Roy Señeres Jr.
  3. Elizabeth Bagonoc
  4. Romeo Ernesto de Guzman
  5. Gaffud Santiago
8. 1-United Transport Koalisyon (1-UTAK)
  1. Vigor Maria Mendoza
  2. Perfecto Itliong Jr.
  3. Orlando Marquez
  4. Manuel Duran
  5. Elizabeth Katalbas
9. **Kusug Tausug**
  1. **Shernee Tan** (incumbent)
  2. Mohammad Salmann Sakili
  3. Sadjid Adil
  4. Michael Dan Valdopiera
  5. Abdurahman Samson
10. Global Workers and Family Federation (Global)
  1. Ermie Lagman-Garon
  2. Cicero Villanueva
  3. Gerald Medina
  4. Evangel Shalom Manugue
  5. Restituto Sibug
  6. Aldrin Cardenas
  7. Alex Solidum
  8. Jose Jouelito Sapio
  9. Mindamor Samlani
  10. Roel Garcia
11. Agila ng Katutubong Pilipino (Agila)
  1. Cedric James Valera
  2. Rolando Rivera
  3. Gil Valera
  4. Romeo Isabelo Jr.
  5. Arnulfo Rivera
12. Ang Nars
  1. Leah Paquiz
  2. Margarita Lourdes Molina
  3. Roderick Atienza
  4. Samuel Titus Paquiz
  5. Clarita Curato
13. Barkadahan para sa Bansa (Barkadahan)
  1. Nolan Banda
  2. Roy Rebanal
  3. Rhodora Reyes
  4. Fernando Mendoza
  5. Rory Pascua
  6. Danilo Francisco
  7. Genelisa Balitaan
  8. Nilo Prieto
  9. Xiri Wyn Yap
  10. Joenel Pogoy
14. Anakpawis
  1. Ariel Casilao (incumbent)
  2. Rafael V. Mariano
  3. Catarina Estavillo
  4. John Milton Lozande
  5. Jose Canlas
  6. Cristina Luza
  7. Isabelo Adviento
15. Women and Child Crime Abuse Assistance (Waccaa)
  1. Marilyn Esden
  2. Antonio Vargas
  3. Shielo Santos
  4. Jennylyn Pascua
  5. Paul Vandolf Lleve
16. **Construction Workers Solidarity (CWS)**
  1. **Romeo Momo**
  2. Earel Benedicto Gardiola
  3. Dionisio Toreja
  4. Crispin Soriano Jr.
  5. Tirso Edwin Gardiola
17. Parents Teachers Alliance (PTA)
  1. Emilio Jose Abelita
  2. Jorge Jose Vargas
  3. Armando Velasco
  4. Jessie Apostol
  5. Maximo Bales Jr.
  6. Arthur Serrano
18. **Rebolusyonaryong Alyansang Makabansa (RAM)**
  1. **Aloysia Lim**
  2. Melvin Contapay
  3. Proceso Maligalig
  4. Teodoro Camacho IV
  5. Sonny Angeles
19. Ako OFW
  1. Celerino Umandap
  2. Modesto Operania
  3. Ponciano Onia Jr.
  4. Ernesto Vinoya
  5. Liberato Cabigas
20. **Dumper Philippines Taxi Drivers Association (Dumper PTDA)**
  1. **Claudine Bautista**
  2. Zenaida de Castro
  3. Fermin Octobre
  4. Arnold Wayne Jacinto
  5. Michaela Rennie Sebastian
21. Luntiang Pilipinas Partylist (Luntian)
  1. Michael Ubac
  2. Ciarra Sotto
  3. Montserrat Romulo
  4. Sonia Mendoza
  5. Edemar Juab
22. Ako Bisdak-Bisayang Dako (Ako Bisdak)
  1. Ernesto Enriquez
  2. Rommel Gavieta
  3. Maria Katrina Enriquez
  4. Rebecca Ann Navarro
  5. Rico Daniel
  6. Hilario Vicente Lagnada
23. Academicians, Students and Educators Alliance (ASEAN)
  1. Winifred Ballada
  2. Roberto Gonzales
  3. Christopher Biore
  4. Leo Gellor
  5. Rey Fernan Refozar
24. **Association of Philippine Electric Cooperatives (APEC)**
  1. **Sergio Dagooc**
  2. Jeffrey Tan-Endriga
  3. Rodrigo Sacedor
  4. Karl Juanito Condes
  5. John Peter Millan
25. Teachers' Dignity Party-List
26. **Puwersa ng Bayaning Atleta (PBA)**
  1. **Jericho Nograles** (incumbent)
  2. Mark Aeron Sambar (incumbent)
  3. Migs Nograles
  4. Ma. Teresa Esguerra
  5. Eduardo Lucas
27. Allied Movement Employment Protection Assistance for Overseas Filipino Workers Access Center (AMEPA OFW)
  1. David Balamon
  2. David Kirkwood Esconili
  3. Antonio Maralit
  4. Abel Balamon
  5. Enzo Balamon
28. Aksyon Health Workers (AHW)
  1. Joseph Carabeo
  2. Maristela Abenojar
  3. Robert Mendoza
  4. Donell John Siazon
  5. Raymond Joshua San Pedro
29. **Bahay para sa Pamilyang Pilipino (Bahay)**
  1. **Naealla Rose Bainto-Aguinaldo**
  2. Procopio Lipana
  3. Peter Vega II
  4. Naereeza Grace Bainto
  5. Rafaelito Soliza
30. Philippine National Police Retirees Association (PRAI)
  1. Van Luspo
  2. Virgilio Batalla
  3. Gaudencio Cordora Jr.
  4. Enrique Manalo
  5. Allyn Evasco
31. Joint Union of Active Nationalist Filipino Movement (Juan Movement)
  1. Vicente Llave Jr.
  2. John Nico Valencia
  3. Mark Roy Boado
  4. Alexander Lapore
  5. Ma. Rosella Tugade
32. Pinagbuklod na Filipino para sa Bayan (Buklod Filipino)
  1. Manuel Redota
  2. Alma Opena-Aquino
  3. Jezaneth Tagabuhin
  4. Paul John Ramos
  5. Edwin Tabar Jr.
33. **Citizens' Battle Against Corruption (CIBAC)**
  1. **Eddie Villanueva**
  2. **Domingo Rivera**
  3. Lyndon Caña
  4. Armi Jane Borje
  5. Stanley Clyde Flores
34. Kaagapay ng Mamamayang Pilipino (KAP)
  1. Andrew Ignatius Untalan
  2. Sharon Bencio
  3. Catherine Anne Llamas
  4. Danny Vanni Ajido
  5. Lani Magno
35. Murang Kuryente
  1. Antonio Paredes Jr.
  2. Gerard Arances
  3. Glenn Ymata
  4. Arlen Gutierez
  5. Alan Tan
36. Angkla: Ang Partido ng mga Pilipinong Marino (Angkla)
  1. Jesulito Manalo (incumbent)
  2. Ronaldo Enrile
  3. Augusto Perez Jr.
  4. Petercon Lugue
  5. Rogelio Benjamin Redoble
37. **Gabriela Women's Party (Gabriela)**
  1. **Arlene Brosas** (incumbent)
  2. Bai Ali Indayla-Mallen
  3. Lucia Francisco
  4. Leona Entena
  5. Leny Ocasiones
  6. Jenelyn Caballero
  7. Marden Jalando-on
  8. Marivic Gerodias
  9. Ruvie Ann Bautista
38. Ako An Bisaya
  1. Ramp Nielsen Uy
  2. Rodolfo Tuazon
  3. Eduardo Veloso
  4. Dahn Greigor Uy
  5. Rodolfo del Valle
39. Isang Lapian ng Mangingisda at Bayan Tungo sa Kaunlaran (1-Lambat)
  1. Reynaldo Soriano
  2. Victorino Anyayahan
  3. Al Ignatius Lopez
  4. Quintin Suelto
  5. Virginia Therese Soriano
40. Ranao Federal State Movement
41. Philippine Environment Recycling Association (PERA)
  1. Mark Teves
  2. Dexter Francisco
  3. Lorelyn Samar
  4. Rafael Concepcion Jr.
  5. Sheralie Sharma
42. **Kabataan Party List (Kabataan)**
  1. **Sarah Elago** (incumbent)
  2. Erika Rae Cruz
  3. Vennel Francis Chenfoo
  4. Ellice Balgos
  5. Florence Kang
  6. Kristian Jacob Lora
43. **An Waray**
  1. **Bem Noel**
  2. Marie Grace Evardone
  3. Zeno Zuniga
  4. Nicole Elena Espina III
  5. Jose Loquinte
44. Sulong Dignidad Party (Sulong Dignidad)
  1. Rico Paolo Quicho
  2. Mary Joycelynn Rodriguez
  3. Benecer Lariosa
  4. Ireneo Aquino
  5. May Anne Umaly
45. Wired and Wireless Internet for Filipino (WIFI)
  1. Ronaldo Manlapig
  2. Rey Ferdinand Binuya
  3. Arturo Cunanan
  4. Erwin Señora
  5. Marjorie Anne Lackar
46. Alliance of Philippine Fishing Federations (All-Fish)
  1. Arnold Naval
  2. Joseph Martin Borromeo
  3. Charles Capricho
  4. Ricardo delos Reyes
  5. Ruiz Leonardo Frias
47. **Alagaan Natin Ating Kalusugan (Anakalusugan)**
  1. Adorlito Ginete
  2. **Mike Defensor**
  3. Emmanuel Andal
  4. Arnielyn Aguirre
  5. Arlene Dominguita
48. **Talino at Galing ng Pinoy (TGP)**
  1. **Jose Teves Jr.**
  2. Roy Ordinario
  3. Nerio Ronquillo Jr.
  4. Eriberto Cabilan Jr.
  5. Eden Yadao
49. Abe Kapampangan (ABEKA)
  1. Edgardo Pamintuan Sr.
  2. Jericho Aguas
  3. Danilo Consumido
  4. Alberto Pamuntuan III
  5. Patrick Cura
50. Isang Alyansang Aalalay sa Pinoy Skilled Workers (1-Aalalay)
51. Aksyon Magsasaka-Partido Tinig ng Masa (AKMA-PTM)
  1. Hadjimar Matba
  2. Michael Kida
  3. Ymil Rjiv Matba
  4. Homer Mabale
  5. Joy Ilagan
  6. Apolonio Mayuga
  7. Saturnino Simbajon
  8. Datusalem Karon
52. Arts Business and Science Professionals (ABS)
  1. Ulysses Garces (incumbent)
  2. Teresita Cabaccang
  3. Catalina Lanting
  4. Rogelio Arroyo
  5. Teresita Castillo
  6. Teresita Lim
53. **BH (Bagong Henerasyon)**
  1. **Bernadette Herrera** (incumbent)
  2. Marlon Manalang
  3. Gerardo Panghulan
  4. Ramon Cruz
  5. Roberto Nazal Jr.
54. **Alyansa ng mga Mamamayang Probinsyano (Ang Probinsyano)**
  1. **Alfred delos Santos**
  2. **Ronnie Ong**
  3. Edward delos Santos
  4. Ronaldo Tuazon
  5. Eubendino Bitor
55. Partido Manggagawa (PM)
  1. Emmanuel Manato
  2. Reynaldo Almendras
  3. Medel Pulanco
  4. Leonides Sequeña
  5. Valeriano Estorosas Sr.
56. Alyansa General Parents Teachers Association-Indigenous People (AGPTA-IP)
  1. Le Marjorie Villaluz
  2. Angelo Reyes
  3. Alyssa Adjul
  4. Philip Sinados
  5. Jonathan Julaine
  6. Datu Abdullatip Paglala
  7. Amiel Lamoste
  8. Datu Sergio Sumatra
  9. Nemesio Diamante
57. Gawang Pinoy
  1. Khristine Dy
  2. William Enrile II
  3. Rudy Ong
  4. Reynold Siy
  5. Wilson Flores
  6. Calvin Coherco
58. Ang National Coalition of Indigenous People Action Na! (ANAC-IP)
  1. Jose Panganiban Jr. (incumbent)
  2. Lourdes Panganiban
  3. Garry James Arenas
  4. Nicole Pauline Dy
  5. Rizalino Segundo
  6. Emmanuel Bigornia
  7. Reynaldo Panganiban Sr.
59. Sinag Tungo sa Kaunlaran (Sinag)
  1. Narciso Santiago III
  2. Richard Perez
  3. Jamco Uy
  4. Jesus Soriano Jr.
  5. Teodoro Evangelista
60. **Public Safety Alliance for Transformation and Rule of Law (Patrol)**
  1. **Jorge Antonio Bustos**
  2. Jesus Dacpano
  3. Mary Rosaleen Agaton
  4. Leonardo Daracan
  5. Raymundo Turla
61. Cyclista at Motorista ng Pilipinas (Cympil)
  1. Mark Kristopher Tolentino
  2. Dioscoro Consuegra
  3. Robenas Canete
  4. Junius Wangkay
  5. Timoteo Lamodoc
  6. Hermenio Camarin
  7. Jason Paul Pascual
  8. Liza Cabaluna
  9. Francis Arcena
  10. Romualdo San Pascual
62. Kabalikat ng Bayan sa Kaunlaran
63. Kooperatiba-Kapisanan ng Magsasaka ng Pilipinas (Koop-Kampi)
  1. Chrissan Bravo
  2. Nilda de la Cruz
  3. Teodulfo Jutba Jr.
  4. Nellene Bravo
  5. Ma. Luisa Alona Olahay
64. Probinsyano People’s Movement
65. Union of Nationalistic Democratic Filipino Organization (UNIDO)
  1. Josef Maganduga
  2. Rogelio Yap
  3. Jose Bayani Laurel Jr.
  4. Jonathan Padua
  5. Georlan Cea
  6. Arturo Libera
  7. Camille Laurel
66. Ang Bol-Anon
67. Serbisyo sa Bayan Party (SBP)
  1. Ranulfo Ludovica
  2. Felicito Valmocina
  3. Vicente Eric Belmonte Jr.
  4. Bart Christian Corpus
  5. Eduard Martin Ignatius Francisco
68. Pilipinas para sa Pinoy (PPP)
  1. Paul Nicholas Magsaysay
  2. Paterno Esmaquel
  3. Antoniero Pernia
  4. Jesus Simora
  5. Edina Almodal
69. Ina na Nagmamahal sa Anak
  1. Maria Georgina de Venecia
  2. Maria Asuncion Yu
  3. Victoria Bautista
  4. Rosella Sotto
  5. Teresita Gonzalez
70. Kilusan ng Organisadong Mamamayan para sa Ulirang Transportasyon at Epektibong Reporma (Komyuter)
  1. Edward Relucio
  2. Maria Josefina Sierra
  3. Wilfredo Trinidad
  4. Crisolito Dionido
  5. Clemente Chan
71. Una Ang Edukasyon (1-Ang Edukasyon)
  1. Salvador Belaro Jr. (incumbent)
  2. Edita Bunuan
  3. Angelita Ocampo
  4. Rey Sto. Domingo Jr.
  5. Avelino de Chavez
  6. Bernard Macinas
72. Kapaitang Magmamais ng Pilipinas (Kamais)
  1. Roger Navarro
  2. Juanito Rama
  3. Jose Benemerito
  4. Maria Concepcion Macasaddu
  5. Julie Rocel Bongcales
73. Ang Laban ng Indiginong Filipino (ALIF)
  1. Acmad Tomawis
  2. Lorenzo Rellosa
  3. Ismael Tomawis
  4. Agakhan Tomawis
  5. Bacolod Madki Maurac
74. Ang Mata'y Alagaan (Mata)
  1. Tricia Nicole Velasco-Catera (incumbent)
  2. Pearl Grace Oaminal
  3. Divina Pinlac
  4. Jeffrey Solomon
  5. Ryan Villafuerte
75. **LPG Marketers Association (LPGMA)**
  1. **Rodolfo Albano Jr.**
  2. Allan Ty
  3. Mattheu Jericho Reyes
  4. Miguel Ponce Jr.
  5. Miguelito Bernal Jr.
76. **Abono**
  1. **Conrado Estrella III** (incumbent)
  2. Vini Nola Ortega (incumbent)
  3. Clemente Arboleda Sr.
  4. Ronald Allan So
  5. Oftociano Manalo Jr.
77. Stop & Go Transport Coalition (Stop & Go)
  1. Pascual Magno Jr.
  2. Ronald Baraoidan
  3. Antonio Keh
  4. Eduardo Pelaez
  5. Renato Solsona
78. Ako Ayoko sa Bawal na Droga (Ako)
  1. Rolan Mendiola
  2. Ma. Corazon Sarmiento
  3. Marvin Tan
  4. Rodolfo Caisip
  5. Lawrence Joseph Libo-on
79. Avid Builders of Active Nation's Citizenry Towards Empowered Philippines (Abante Pilipinas)
  1. George Arnaiz
  2. Kristine Felix
  3. Alvin Patrimonio
  4. Charles Owen
  5. Emmanuel Tapay
80. **Marino Samahan ng mga Seaman (Marino)**
  1. **Carlo Lisandro Gonzalez**
  2. **Jose Antonio Lopez**
  3. Carlo Pio Pacana
  4. Ike Solis
  5. Ian Rhey Tampipi
81. Liga ng mga Mag-Uumang Probinsyano (Liga ng mga Mag-Uuma)
  1. Benjamin Santos
  2. Catherine Canoy
  3. Emmanuel Sumalde
  4. Diomedes Cunanan
  5. Renebeth Lavisores
82. Ang Tao Muna at Bayan (Tao Muna)
  1. Farida Fajardo
  2. Emolyn Caubang-Manalo
  3. Amieliza Sansait
  4. Lanie Abcede
  5. Chester Gonzales
83. **ACT Teachers**
  1. **France Castro** (incumbent)
  2. Benjamin Valbuena
  3. Jeannette Cawiding
  4. Fabian Hallig
  5. David Michael San Juan
84. People's Champ Guardians (People's Champ)
  1. Benito Brizuela Sr.
  2. Nicolas Enciso VIII
  3. Carlos Ambayec
  4. Hermogenes Teves
  5. Aniceto Darunday
85. Kapisanan ng Nagkakaisang Naghahangad ng Kaunlaran, Kasaganaan, Katahimikan at Pagkakaisa (Kaunlaran)
  1. Ronald Macaraig
  2. Salome Blanco
  3. Jenerose Diamante
  4. Jury Argolida
  5. Lea Isip
86. Alay Buhay Community Development Foundation (Alay Buhay)
  1. Michael Fermin
  2. Felix Ople
  3. Antonio Sayo
  4. Rodolfo Mallari
  5. Filipinas Villasis
87. **Buhay Hayaan Yumabong (Buhay)**
  1. **Lito Atienza** (incumbent)
  2. Rene Velarde
  3. Melquiades Robles
  4. Francisco Xavier Xacinto Padilla
  5. Wilfrido Vilalrama
88. Akbayan Citizens Action Party (Akbayan)
  1. Tomasito Villarin (incumbent)
  2. Gregorio Ramon Tingson
  3. Doris Dinorog-Obena
  4. Angelina Ludovice-Katoh
  5. Napoleon Merida Jr.
  6. Cristina Oganiza
89. Partido Sandugo
  1. Francis Cusi
  2. Micah Abijah Valiente
  3. Regino Quing Jr.
  4. John Go Jr.
  5. John Dominic Censon
90. Confederation of Senior Citizens Coalition of Phil.
91. **Probinsyano Ako** (Note: Jose Singson Jr. took office as Probinsyano Ako's second representative.)
  1. **Rudys Caesar Fariñas**
  2. Lira Fuster-Fariñas
  3. Charito Malicad
  4. Teresita Rapatan
  5. Genaro Turqueza
92. **Ako Bisaya**
  1. **Sonny Lagon**
  2. Jarvis Prochina
  3. Lotis Pacaldo
  4. Julieta Pelonio
  5. Paul Sherwind Belciña
93. Alliance of Volunteer Educators (AVE)
  1. Eulogio Magsaysay
  2. Alicia Diel
  3. Nicolas Braña
  4. Elisa Monje
  5. Eden Coso
94. Movement for Economic Transformation and Righteous Opportunities (METRO)
  1. Emelita Alvarez
  2. Val Lim
  3. Ronnie Mendoza
  4. Eduardo Carlo Claudio III
  5. Mark Pacheco
95. Ating Agapay Sentrong Samahan ng mga Obrero (Aasenso)
  1. Isagani Nerez
  2. Fernando Lee
  3. Rolande Magno
  4. Felix Cruz
  5. Eladio Gatmaitan
96. **Alliance of Organizations, Networks and Associations of the Philippines (ALONA)** (Note: Anna Suarez took office as ALONA's representative.)
  1. Eleanor Florido
  2. Maria Katarina Ruiz
  3. Karla Regina Valera-Chua
  4. Monica Leonila Siron
  5. Liza Vida
97. Tribal Communities Association of the Philippines (Tricap)
  1. Ernanie Calica
  2. Lamech Peralta
  3. Jon Karl Sibug
  4. Joyce Morgia
  5. Saturnino Lavad
98. Barangay Natin (BANAT)
  1. Joseph Al Randie Wong
  2. Jillian Sze
  3. Sannah Frivaldo
  4. Marilou Pornillos
  5. Juliet Rosal
99. **Tingog Sinirangan**
  1. **Yedda Romualdez**
  2. Jude Acidre
  3. Jaime Go
  4. Alexis Yu
  5. Jenifer Padual
100. **Manila Teachers Savings and Loan Association (Manila Teachers)**
  1. **Virgilio Lacson** (incumbent)
  2. Paul Sembrano
  3. Gil Magbanua
  4. Isabelita Santos
  5. Ma. Victoria Suarez
  6. Carmencita Lacson
  7. Asuncion Howe
  8. Mila Pilapil
  9. Evelyn Dimagiba
  10. Angelita Alfante
101. **Anti-Crime and Terrorism Community Involvement and Support (ACT-CIS)**
  1. **Eric Yap**
  2. **Jocelyn Tulfo**
  3. **Rowena Niña Taduran**
  4. Edgar Yap
  5. Jeffrey Soriano
102. Ang Siguro (ASI)
  1. Jesusito Santiago
  2. Alan Alvarez
  3. Cleto Obello Jr.
  4. Erik Evangelista
  5. Heriberto de Leon
103. Append
  1. Eduardo Jimenez
  2. Peter Montalban
  3. Narciso San Miguel
  4. Virginia Juan
  5. Edgardo Garcia
104. Confederation of Non-Stock Savings and Loan Associations (Consla)
  1. King Collantes
  2. Milagros Azanza
  3. Arthur Senosa
  4. Ronald Dominguez
  5. Melchor Ramos
105. Kaisahan ng mga Maliliit na Magsasaka (KMM)
  1. Veronica Rellosa
  2. Lourdes Gula
  3. Trinidad Domingo
  4. Fermin Idea
  5. Elena Sta. Ana
106. Isogdabaw
  1. Ramon Allado
  2. Eduardo Ramon Dimaano
  3. Peter Paul Dy
  4. Wilfredo Guerzon Jr.
  5. Jershum Manglinong
107. 1Anak Ti Ilocano Association
108. Abakada Guro (Abakada)
  1. Jonathan dela Cruz
  2. Nonette Tiam
  3. Julian Rodrigo dela Cruz
  4. Samantha Pilar Magahum
  5. Josephine Reyes
  6. Ryan Tanjutco
109. **Kalinga-Advocacy for Social Empowerment and Nation-Building Through Easing Poverty (Kalinga)**
  1. **Irene Gay Saulog**
  2. Uzziel Caponpon
  3. Gladys Claire Quillao
  4. Kirsten Michelle Ferriol
  5. Arturo Ferriol Jr.
110. Noble Advancement of Marvelous People of the Philippines (Marvelous Tayo)
  1. Armando Diaz
  2. William Juan
  3. Alberto Cabael
  4. Ricardo Taytay
  5. Ariel Catignas
111. Ang Pasahero (API)
  1. Melecio Go
  2. Florito Molbog
  3. Macario Perilla
  4. Andrew Sufrir
  5. Sylvia Tanya Huber
112. **Ang Asosasyon sang Mangunguma nga Bisaya-Owa Mangunguma (Aambis-Owa)**
  1. **Sharon Garin** (incumbent)
  2. Hernan Biron Jr.
  3. Evangelina Intal
  4. Felix Flores
  5. Jimmy Garin
113. Tinderong Pinoy Party (Tinderong Pinoy)
  1. Meldin Alfonso Roy
  2. Kelly Uy
  3. Evelyn Catherine Silagon
  4. Rey Roy
  5. Rodrigo Chavez Jr.
114. Agri-Agra na Reforma para sa Magsasaka ng Pilipinas Movement (AGRI)
  1. Delphine Lee (incumbent)
  2. Orestes Salon (incumbent)
  3. Vicente Bonaobra II
  4. Daisy Gan
  5. Ricardo Gutierrez Jr.
115. **Agricultural Sector Alliance of the Philippines (AGAP)**
  1. **Rico Geron** (incumbent)
  2. Kathleen Briones
  3. Victorino Michael Lescano
  4. Edwin Macasaet
  5. Cipriano Dennis Cocadiz
116. Acts Overseas Filipino Workers Coalition of Organizations (Acts-OFW)
  - First list:
    1. Aniceto Bertiz III (incumbent)
    2. Venecio Legaspi
    3. Francisco Aguilar Jr.
    4. Ernesto Maceda
    5. Cecile Benitez
    6. Romeo Escober
    7. Noli Pacquiao
    8. Wilma Abay
  - Second list:
    1. Feliciano Adorna Jr.
    2. Julien Dancel
    3. Ameer Salman Mahumanoy
    4. Maria Gracita Rivera
    5. Vicente Feliciano Jr.
117. Federation of International Cable TV and Telecommunications Association of the Philippines (Fictap)
  1. Estrellita Juliano-Tamano
  2. Cecilia la Madrid-Dy
  3. Antonio Silloriquez
  4. Alvin Ty
  5. Ruben Cortez
118. People Surge Disaster Survivors Group (People Surge)
  1. Efleda Bautista
  2. Roseller Tan
  3. Pergentino Deri-on Jr.
  4. Maricel Nacabu-an
  5. Elna Tamayo
119. Alliance for Truthful Information (ATIN)
  1. King Cortez
  2. Nelson Santos
  3. Ferdinand Villamente
  4. Bryan Edward Villasana
  5. Kiemfer Laine Madla
120. Pambansang Nagkakaisa sa Paggawa at Agrikultura (PNPA)
  1. Socrates Piñol
  2. Ma. Luisa Aldeguer
  3. Junjun Ucab
  4. Lester Rasonabe
  5. Arnel Leo Tilos
  6. Ramil Paniza
  7. James Aldeguer
  8. Otillo Densing Jr.
121. Sandigan ng mga Manggagawa sa Konstruksiyon (Samako)
  1. Franz William Ernest Belgica
  2. Robert de Guzman
  3. Rogelio Jose Valle
  4. Melanie Privaldo
122. **One Patriotic Coalition of Marginalized Nationals (1Pacman)**
  1. **Mikee Romero** (incumbent)
  2. **Enrico Pineda** (incumbent)
  3. Marlon Bautista
  4. Marvee Espejo
  5. Edwin Joseph Galvez
123. 1-Ang Trabahador na Pinoy
124. Abante Mindanao (Abamin)
  1. Mary Grace Rodriguez
  2. Dionisio Caballero
  3. Antonio Linog
  4. Erlinda Oras
  5. Luis Ostique
125. Pederalismo ng Dugong Dakilang Samahan (PDDS)
126. Partido Lakas ng Masa (PLM)
  1. Benjo Basas
  2. Cesar Melencio
  3. Jose Aaron Pedrosa Jr.
  4. Flora Santos
  5. Portia Ariesgado
127. Awareness of Keepers of the Environment (AWAKE)
  1. Edgar Lopez
  2. Eulogio Agatep II
  3. Angelina Salas
  4. Michael Molino
  5. Antonio Magtibay
128. Katipunan ng mga Guardians Brotherhood (KGB)
  1. Mario Cerilles
  2. Baltaire Balangauan
  3. Edgardo Alcover
  4. Fabian Maamo Jr.
  5. Alfred Genosolango
129. United Filipino Consumers & Commuters (UFCC)
  1. RJ Javellana
  2. Al Vitangcol
  3. Mae Fuentes
  4. Olan Dollente
  5. Ericson Aniban
130. **Coalition of Association of Senior Citizens in the Philippines (Senior Citizens)**
  - First list:
    1. **Francisco Datol** (incumbent)
    2. Aurora Mojica-Garcia
    3. Erlinda Ordanes
    4. Rogelio Galman
    5. Jaime Cruz
  - Second list:
    1. Milagros Magsaysay (incumbent)
    2. Romeo Allam
    3. Minandro Reyes
    4. Albina Sarona
    5. Rosita Lacson
    6. Romeo Serrano
    7. Expedito Pilar
  - Third list:
    1. Godofredo Arquiza
    2. Rogelio Evasco
    3. Restituto Olandria
    4. Remedios Arquiza
    5. Sebastian Sajorda
131. **Advocacy for Teacher Empowerment through Action, Cooperation, and Harmony Toward Educational Reforms (A Teacher)**
  1. Mariano Piamonte Jr.
  2. **Maria Victoria Umali**
  3. Elizabeth Saldivar
  4. Mary Grace Villanueva
  5. Angelita Cunanan
132. **Galing sa Puso Party (GP)**
  1. **Jose Gay Padiernos**
  2. Reynaldo Esmeralda
  3. Antonio Bernardo
  4. Jan Rurik Padiernos
  5. Joy Carlos
133. Alliance of Public Transport Organization (1-APTO)
  1. Ireneo Calico Jr.
  2. Rolando Pelinggon Jr.
  3. Virgilio Ferrer II
  4. Eliezer Brioso
  5. Paulo Cempron
134. One Advocacy for Health, Progress and Opportunity (1-AHAPO)
  1. Cary Lazo
  2. Francis Miranda
  3. Wilgelmo Galura
  4. Servillano Flores Jr.
  5. Manolo Nono
135. Association of Farmers, Fisherfolks and Small Miners
136. Ang Kabuhayan
  1. Dennis Laogan (incumbent)
  2. Ma. Fee Kristine Hong-Cai
  3. Maribeth Aglibot
  4. Lilibeth Calatay
  5. Eduardo Allosa
137. You Against Corruption and Poverty (YACAP)
  1. Carol Jane Lopez
  2. Plaridel Abaya
  3. Benhur Lopez Jr. (incumbent)
  4. Annaliza Navarra
  5. Jerlyn Baldicantos
138. **Magdalo Para sa Pilipino (Magdalo)**
  1. **Manuel Cabochan**
  2. Eugene Louie Gonzalez
  3. Elmer Curz
  4. Ian Luis Badecao III
  5. Jeveehboy Macarubbo
139. Alliance of National Urban Poor Organization Assembly (ANUPA)
  1. Liborio Gonzales
  2. Sergio Ocaña
  3. Rey Noel Amante
  4. Rocelyn dela Peña
  5. Ma. Luz Gerundio
140. 1st Consumers Alliance for Rural Energy (1-CARE)
  1. Carlos Roman Uybarreta (incumbent)
  2. Ashary Maongco
  3. Veronica Briones
  4. Romeo Cuasay
  5. Roman Araño
141. **Ako Bicol Political Party (Ako Bicol)** (Note: Zaldy Co took office as Ako Bicol's second representative.)
  1. **Alfredo Garbin** (incumbent)
  2. Justin Caesar Anthony Batocabe
  3. Ronald Ang (incumbent)
  4. Aderma Angelie Alcazar
  5. Jil Bongalon
142. **Cooperative NATCCO Network (Coop-NATCCO)**
  1. **Sabiniano Canama** (incumbent)
  2. Reynaldo Gandionco
  3. Divina Quemi
  4. Antonio Arañas
  5. Manuel Mabini
  6. Erwin Veneracion
  7. Rosalino Sumile
  8. Arnulfo Magcope
143. Kilusang Maypagasa (Maypagasa)
  1. Cezar Mancao
  2. Dindo Domantay
  3. Ronald Galicia
  4. Cezar Carmel Tamba
  5. Aldrin Baldonado
144. Adhikaing Tinaguyod ng Kooperatiba (Ating Koop)
  1. Maan Teodoro
  2. Roberto Mascariña
  3. Antonio Manuel Alcantara
  4. Elpidio Abela
  5. Loreto Ramiro
  6. Jessie Tioaquen
145. Adhikain at Kilusan ng Ordinaryong Tao Laban sa Kahirapan
146. Guardjan – Association of Guard, Utility Helper, Aider, Rider, Driver/Domestic Helper, Janitor, Agent, Nanny of the Philippines (Guardjan)
  1. Leonardo Olaer
  2. Josefa Vidal
  3. Aurora Canave
  4. Amparo Almeron
  5. Alexis Chua
147. Association of Lady Entrepreneurs (Aleng Entrep)
  1. Maria Divina Dracia Mangudadatu
  2. Jasmin Yumul
  3. Maria Cristina Turgano
  4. Janette Domingo
  5. Alieya Rainne Soto
148. Aangat Tayo
  1. Neil Abayon (incumbent)
  2. Mary Rose Ong
  3. Gizelle Lou Cabahug-Fugoso
  4. Milliscent Ann Abayon
  5. Ronelle Chia
149. Kabalikat ng Nagkakaisang Manileño (Kabalikat)
  1. Donato Lising
  2. Mary Jane Tan
  3. Romeo Achacoso Sr.
  4. John John Ignacio
  5. Henry Acebuche
150. **Barangay Health Wellness (BHW)**
  1. **Natasha Co**
  2. Jason Rodenas
  3. Ana-lyn Sian
  4. Charlton Duran
  5. Alvin Carandang
151. **Rural Electric Consumers and Beneficiaries of Development and Advancement (Recoboda)**
  1. **Godofredo Guya**
  2. Zenaida Embodo
  3. Josie Calonsag
  4. Al Castillon
  5. Danilo Villamar
152. **Ako Padayon Pilipino (Ako Padayon)**
  1. **Adriano Ebcas**
  2. Reynaldo Sindo
  3. Vladimir Elazagui
  4. Albert Baus
  5. Juancho Chiong
153. **Anak Mindanao (AMIN)**
  1. **Amihilda Sangcopan** (incumbent)
  2. Cesar Ylanan
  3. Abdul Aziz Silatan
  4. Ronaldo Peñas
  5. Marlon Legaspi
154. Alliance of OFW Party (Alliance)
  1. Abolcair Guro
  2. Zenaida Concepcion-Gagno
  3. Fidel Escurel
  4. Rodolfo Cornejo
  5. Ma. Fe Nicodemus
155. Tanggol Maralita (Ito Ang Tama)
  1. Isagani Pascual
  2. Jose Manuel Mendoza
  3. Teodulo Malagen
  4. Helen Ng-Pascual
  5. Maria Nieves Ng-Pascual
156. One Unified Transport Alliance of the Philippines-Bicol Region (1 UTAP Bicol)
  1. Exequiel Longares
  2. Renato Corpuz Jr.
  3. Philip Miguel
  4. Peter Leo Ralla
  5. Paulino Mendros
157. **Duty to Energize the Republic Through the Enlightenment of the Youth Sectoral Party-List Organization (Duterte Youth)**
  1. **Ducielle Cardema** (Note: Ducielle Cardema took office on October 13, 2020.)
  2. Joseph de Guzman
  3. Benilda de Guzman
  4. Arnaldo Villafranca
  5. Elizabeth Anne Cardema
158. Butil Farmers Party (Butil)
  1. Cecilia Leonila Chavez (incumbent)
  2. Agapito Guanlao
  3. Jacinto Jose Jr.
  4. Wilfredo Antimano
  5. Prudencio Consolacion
159. Pambansang Kilusan ng Nagkakaisang Manggagawa (Kilos Na Manggagawa)
  1. Elmer Labog
  2. Jaime Paglinawan Sr.
  3. Gloria Arellano
  4. Florentino Viuya Jr.
  5. Mody Floranda
  6. Arman Hernando
160. Tourism Educators and Movers, Philippines (Team Philippines)
  1. Xander Kim Sigua
  2. Gerardo Pradez
  3. Sarah Monzon-Po
  4. Jeffrey Soriano
  5. Xavier Leo Gumabon
161. Ang Aking Ina Ipaglaban
162. Green Force for the Environment Sons and Daughters of Mother Earth (Greenforce)
163. **Abang Lingkod**
  1. **Stephen Paduano** (incumbent)
  2. Eric Saratan
  3. George Arnel Piso
  4. Jan Padios dela Cruz
  5. Marlyn Malacon
164. Agbiag! Timpuyog Ilocano (Agbiag!)
  1. Michaelina Antonio
  2. Thompson Lantion
  3. George Briones
  4. Bibiana Trinidad
  5. Jorge Sales
165. Minimum Wage Earners and Advocates (Minimum Wage Earners)
  1. Arnel Dolendo
  2. Herman Nicdao
  3. Rosendo Escareal
  4. Arvin Dolendo
  5. Margarita Grefaldio
166. **Trade Union Congress Party (TUCP)**
  1. **Raymond Mendoza** (incumbent)
  2. Jerry John Taray
  3. Nora Analyn Demetrio
  4. Temistocles Dejon Jr.
  5. Arthur Juego
167. 1Accountants Party-List (1Accountants)
  1. Christian Jay Lim
  2. Roque Lumanlan
  3. Tiffanny Ann Cabañog
  4. Jose Emmanuel Guillermo
  5. Allan Basarte
168. Filipino Family Party (PFP)
  1. Irma Julaton
  2. Annie Andanar
  3. Benjamin Dimaano
  4. Joel Astilla
  5. Mikael Ray Balulot
169. Wow Pilipinas Movement (Wow Pilipinas)
  1. Patricia Keng
  2. Leonard de Vera
  3. Frederick Christian Plaza
  4. Mary de Jesus
  5. Donamie Masangcay
170. **Social Amelioration and Genuine Intervention on Poverty (SAGIP)**
  1. **Rodante Marcoleta** (incumbent)
  2. Kristine Angela Redoble
  3. Erlinda Santiago
  4. Camilo Bacha
  5. Emelinda San Antonio
171. **Democratic Independent Workers Association (DIWA)**
  1. **Michael Edgar Aglipay**
  2. Leopoldo Blanco Jr.
  3. Ambrosio Lambus Jr.
  4. Ely Quiñola
  5. Reynaldo Cuaderno
172. **Philippine Rural Electric Cooperatives Association (Philreca)**
  1. **Presley de Jesus**
  2. Reynaldo Villanueva
  3. Gloria Corrales
  4. Danny Pondevilla
  5. Janeene Depay-Colingan
173. One Philippines (1P)
  1. Rafael Louis Alunan
  2. Arturo Lomibao
  3. Edilberto Adan
  4. Jahara Omar
  5. Aristeo Ignacio
174. Gawing Una ang Tagumpay ng Ordinaryong Mamamayan (GUTOM)
  1. Rex Anthony Villegas
  2. Ma. Gina Africa
  3. Maria Katrina Nicole Contacto
  4. Christopher Frias
  5. Jose Macaspac III
175. Partido ng Bayan ang Bida (PBB)
  1. Imelda Cruz
  2. Jose Castigador Jr.
  3. Ma. Corazon Gumila
  4. Gerald Domingo
  5. Richard Sabarillo
  6. Marvin Marcelo
  7. Maricel Cruz
176. Laang Kawal ng Pilipinas (Laang Kawal)
  1. Jaime Roberto Almario
  2. Nathaniel Marquez
  3. Datu Guiadzali Midtimbang
  4. Gaudencio Manalac
  5. Francisco Dimalanta
177. 1 Alliance Advocating Autonomy Party (1AAAP)
  1. Ana Emelita Alvarez
  2. Miguelito Pato
  3. Cedric Sean Aang
  4. Linus Galias
  5. Michael Victor Pato
178. YESPH Community Development
179. RBU Tamang Isip Mental Health Center (Tamang Isip)
180. Grains Retailers' Confederation of the Philippines (Grecon)
  1. Maria Leobeth Deslate-Delicana
  2. Orlando Manuntag
  3. Pablo Gonzales
  4. Lucila Damasco
  5. Zenaida Lim
181. Kasosyo Producer Consumer Exchange Association (AA-Kasosyo Party)
  1. Mocha Uson
  2. Mohammed Hussein Pangandaman
  3. Teodoro Pastrana
  4. Marilyn Macalagay
  5. Jamir Ashraff Pacasum
