= List of members of the House of Representatives of the Philippines (C) =

This is a complete list of past and present members of the House of Representatives of the Philippines whose last names begin with the letter C.

This list also includes members of the Philippine Assembly (1907–1916), the Commonwealth National Assembly (1935–1941), the Second Republic National Assembly (1943–1944) and the Batasang Pambansa (1978–1986).

== Ca ==
- Sotero Cabahug, member for Cebu's 2nd district (1928–1934)
- Salvador Cabaluna III, member for 1-CARE party-list (2010–2013)
- Bartolome Cabangbang, member for Bohol's 2nd district (1954–1965) and Region VII (1978–1984)
- Leon Cabarroguis, member for Nueva Vizcaya (1945–1953)
- Argel Joseph Cabatbat, member for Magsasaka party-list (2019–2022)
- Apolinario Cabigon, member for Davao (1946–1949)
- Belma Cabilao, member for Zamboanga del Sur's 3rd district (1992–1998), Zamboanga Sibugay (2001–2007), and Zamboanga Sibugay's 1st district (2007–2016)
- Camilo Cabili, member for Iligan (1984–1986)
- Tomas Cabili, member for Lanao (1935–1941)
- Gerado Cabochan, member for Caloocan's 2nd district (1987–1992)
- Jose Cabochan, member for Bulacan's 3rd district (1987–1992)
- Manuel Cabochan, member of Magdalo party-list (2019–2022)
- Fernando Cabredo, member for Albay's 3rd district (2019–2025)
- Florencio Caedo, member for Batangas's 2nd district (1909–1912)
- Douglas Cagas, member for Davao del Sur (1984–1986), and Davao del Sur's 1st district (1998–2007)
- John Tracy Cagas, member for Davao del Sur (2022–present)
- Marc Douglas Cagas IV, member for Davao del Sur's 1st district (2007–2013)
- Mercedes Cagas, member for Davao del Sur's 1st district (2013–2016), and Davao del Sur (2016–2022)
- Juan Cailles, member for Mountain Province (1925–1931)
- Wilfredo Cainglet, member for Zamboanga del Sur's 3rd district (1987–1992)
- Mitch Cajayon-Uy, member for Caloocan's 2nd district (2007–2013, 2022–2025)
- Carlos Cajelo, member for Cotabato (1984–1986)
- Roberto Cajes, member for Bohol's 2nd district (2001–2010)
- Jose Cajulis, member for Cavite (1953–1957)
- Ciriaco Calalang, member for KABAYAN party-list (2018)
- Francisco Calalay Jr., member for Quezon City's 1st district (2013–2016)
- Reynaldo Calalay, member for Quezon City's 1st district (1995–2004)
- Marie Josephine Calatrava, member for Tingog party-list (2025)
- Emerito Calderon, member for Cebu's 5th district (1969–1972), Cebu (1984–1986), and COCOFED party-list (1998–2001)
- Maria Victoria Calderon, sectoral member (1984–1986)
- Patricia Calderon, member for Cebu's 7th district (2025–present)
- Peter John Calderon, member for Cebu's 7th district (2016–2025)
- Eladio Caliwara, member for Quezon's 2nd district (1961–1969)
- Antonino Calixto, member for Pasay (2019–present)
- Gabrielle Calizo-Quimpo, member for Aklan (2001–2004)
- Marcial Calleja, member for Albay's 1st district (1909–1912)
- Marcos Calo, member for Agusan (1946–1953)
- Bonifacio Camacho, member for Bataan (1946–1949)
- Raymundo Camacho, member for Pangasinan's 3rd district (1919–1925)
- Teodoro Camacho, member for Bataan (1928–1931, 1934–1941)
- Manuel Camara, member for Region IV (1978–1984)
- Juanito Camasura Jr., member for Davao del Sur's 1st district (1987–1992)
- Wilfredo Caminero, member for Cebu's 2nd district (2013–2022)
- Luis Campos, member for Makati's 2nd district (2016–2025)
- Roman Campos, member for Ilocos Norte's 2nd district (1922–1925)
- Sabiniano Canama, member for Coop-NATCCO party-list (2016–2022)
- Antonio Canao, member for Mountain Province (1949–1953)
- Romeo Candazo, member for Marikina (1992–2001)
- Jose Cando, member for Nueva Ecija's 1st (1946–1949)
- Rommel Cañete, sectoral member (1984–1986)
- Aber Canlas, member for Pampanga (1984–1986)
- Ranulfo Canonigo, member for KAKUSA party-list (2009–2013)
- Mateo Canonoy, member for Leyte's 1st district (1945–1946, 1949–1953)
- Reuben Canoy, member for Region X (1978–1984)
- Rudy Caoagdan, member for Cotabato's 2nd district (2019–present)
- Nicolas Capistrano, member for Misamis's 2nd district (1909–1916)
- Benjamin Cappleman, member for Ifugao (1992–2001)
- Antonio Carag, member for Cagayan (1984–1986)
- Nicanor Carag, member for Cagayan's 1st district (1934–1935, 1945–1946), and Cagayan (1943–1944)
- Fermin Caram, member for Iloilo (1943–1944)
- Fermin Caram Jr., member for Iloilo's 2nd district (1965–1972), Region VI (1978–1984), and Iloilo (1984–1986)
- Rafael Carranceja, member for Camarines Norte (1925–1928)
- Drixie Mae Cardema, member for the Duterte Youth party-list (2022–2025)
- Ducielle Cardema, member for the Duterte Youth party-list (2020–2022)
- Carl Cari, member for Leyte's 5th district (2019–present)
- Carmen Cari, member for Leyte's 5th district (2001–2010)
- Jose Carlos Cari, member for Leyte's 5th district (2010–2019)
- Pedro Carillo, member for Bukidnon (1943–1944)
- Marcelo Caringal, member for Batangas's 2nd district (1912–1916)
- Noel Cariño, member for Pasig (2004)
- Bobbit Carlos, member for Valenzuela's 1st district (2004–2007)
- Angel Carloto, member for Zamboanga del Norte's 3rd district (1987–1998, 2001–2004)
- Angeles Carloto II, member for Zamboanga del Norte's 3rd district (1998–2001)
- Tranquilino Carmona, member for Negros Occidental's 1st district (1992–1995, 2004–2007)
- Judy Carunungan, member for the Youth sector (1978–1984)
- Filomeno Caseñas, member for Bohol's 3rd district (1916–1922, 1931–1934)
- Manuel Cases, member for La Union's 2nd district (1946–1965)
- Sabas Casibang, member for Cagayan's 2nd district (1931–1934)
- Ariel Casilao, member for Anakpawis party-list (2016–2019)
- Nanette Castelo-Daza, member for Quezon City's 4th district (2001–2010)
- Winston Castelo, member for Quezon City's 4th district (2010–2019)
- Lino Castillejo, member for Isabela (1943–1944, 1945–1946)
- Claudio Castillejos, member for Batanes (1919–1925)
- Epifanio Castillejos, member for La Union's 2nd district (1965–1969)
- Juan Castillejos, member for Batanes (1916–1919)
- Teofilo Castillejos, member for Batanes (1909–1911)
- Miguel Castillo, member for Tayabas's 1st district (1938–1941)
- Natalio Castillo, member for Bohol's 1st district (1953–1972)
- Vicente Gustilo, member for Negros Occidental (1943–1944)
- France Castro, member for ACT Teachers party-list (2016–2025)
- Fredenil Castro, member for Capiz's 2nd district (2001–2010, 2013–2022)
- Jane Castro, member for Capiz's 2nd district (2010–2013, 2022–present)
- Nancy Catamco, member for Cotabato's 2nd district (2010–2019)
- Percival Catane, member for Misamis Occidental's 1st district (1992–1998)
- Elmer Catulpos, member for 1Tahanan party-list (2026–present
- Casiano Causin, member for Cebu's 6th district (1907–1909)
- Eulalio Causing, member for Cebu's 7th district (1909–1914)
- Lucas Cauton, member for Ilocos Sur's 2nd district (1969–1972)
- Alan Peter Cayetano, member for Taguig's 1st district–Pateros (1998–2007, 2019–2022)
- Pia Cayetano, member for Taguig's 2nd district (2016–2019)
- Lani Cayetano, member for Taguig's 1st district–Pateros (2007–2010, 2019–2022)
- Lino Cayetano, member for Taguig's 2nd district (2013–2016)
- Rene Cayetano, member for Taguig–Pateros–Muntinlupa (1984–1986)
- Tim Cayton, member for Nueva Vizcaya (2025–present)

== Ce ==
- Edmundo B. Cea, member for Camarines Sur's 2nd district (1949–1953), and Camarines Sur (1984–1986)
- Severo Cea, member for Camarines Sur's 2nd district (1931–1934)
- Sulpicio Cea, member for Ambos Camarines's 3rd district (1916–1919), Camarines Sur's 2nd district (1922–1925), and Albay's 3rd district (1934–1935)
- Aurelio Cecilio, member for Nueva Ecija's 2nd district (1928–1931)
- Silverio Cecilio, member for Ambos Camarines's 1st district (1912–1916, 1919–1922)
- Francisco Celebrado, member for Camarines Sur's 1st district (1935–1941)
- Arnold Celeste, member for Pangasinan's 1st district (2019–2022)
- Arthur Celeste, member for Pangasinan's 1st district (2001–2010, 2022–present)
- Jesus Celeste, member for Pangasinan's 1st district (2010–2019)
- Gregorio Cendaña, member for Pangasinan (1984–1986)
- Perci Cendaña, member for Akbayan party-list (2024–present)
- Antonio Ceniza, member for Region IX (1978–1984)
- Jhong Ceniza, member for Davao de Oro's 2nd district (2025–present)
- Arnel Cerafica, member for Taguig's 1st district–Pateros (2010–2019)
- Antonio Cerilles, member for Zamboanga del Sur's 2nd district (1987–1998, 2004–2010)
- Aurora E. Cerilles, member for Zamboanga del Sur's 2nd district (1998–2001, 2010–2019)
- Vicente Cerilles, member for Zamboanga del Sur (1969–1972, 1984–1986)
- Jose Cervantes, member for Agricultural Labor sector (1978–1984)
- Homobono Cezar, member for Misamis Oriental's 1st district (1992–1998)

== Ch ==
- Cynthia Chan, member for Lapu-Lapu City (2022–2025)
- Jan Franz Chan, member for Ako Bicol party-list (2026–present)
- Junard Chan, member for Lapu-Lapu City (2025–present)
- Edgar Chatto, member for Bohol's 1st district (2001–2010, 2019–2025)
- Eladio Chatto, member for Bohol (1984–1986)
- Celestino Chaves, member for Davao (1943–1944)
- Victorico Chaves, member for Misamis Oriental's 2nd district (1987–1998)
- Cecilia Leonila Chavez, member for Butil party-list (2016–2019)
- Leonila Chavez, member for Butil party-list (2002–2004, 2004–2010)
- Cesar Chavez, member for Youth sector (1992–1995)
- Pedro Chavez, member for Sorsogon's 2nd district (1907–1909)
- James Chiongbian, member for South Cotabato (1965–1972), South Cotabato's 3rd district (1987–1992, and Sarangani (1992–1998)
- Erwin Chiongbian, member for Sarangani (2001–2010)
- William Chiongbian, member for Misamis Occidental (1953–1961, 1965–1972)
- Joaquin Chipeco Sr., member for Laguna's 1st district (1962–1965, 1969–1972)
- Jun Chipeco, member for Laguna's 2nd district (1987–1992, 1995–2004, 2013–2019), and Calamba (2019–2022)
- Justin Marc Chipeco, member for Laguna's 2nd district (2004–2013)
- Glenn Chong, member for Biliran (2007–2010)
- Katrina Reiko Chua-Tai, member for Zamboanga City's 1st district (2025–present)
- Edward Chua, sectoral member (1984–1986)
- Joel Chua, member for Manila's 3rd district (2022–present)
- Solomon Chungalao, member for Ifugao (2001–2010, 2019–present)

== Ci ==
- Eutiquio Cimafranca, member for Region VII (1978–1984)
- Atilano Cinco, member for Leyte's 5th district (1946–1953)
- Eladio Cinco, member for Samar's 3rd district (1909–1912)

== Cl ==
- Hilary Clapp, member for Mountain Province (1931–1934, 1943–1944)
- Eliseo Claravall, member for Isabela (1909–1916)
- Ernie Clarete, member for Misamis Occidental's 1st district (2001–2007)
- Marina Clarete, member for Misamis Occidental's 1st district (2007–2010)
- José Clarín, member for Bohol's 2nd district (1907–1916)
- Luis Clarin, member for Bohol's 1st district (1946–1953)
- Olegario Clarin, member for Bohol's 2nd district (1925–1928, 1935–1941, 1945–1946)
- Jovito Claudio, member for Pasay (1992–1998)
- Fortunato Clavano, member for Misamis's 2nd district (1919–1922)
- William Claver, member for Kalinga-Apayao (1987–1992)
- Engracio Clemeña, member for Manila's 1st district (1945–1946, 1949–1953)
- Andres Clemente Jr., member for Masbate (1965–1969)
- Tomas Clemente, member for Sorsogon's 2nd district (1935–1941, 1946–1953)
- Beng Climaco, member for Zamboanga City's 1st district (2007–2013)
- Cesar Climaco, member for Zamboanga City (1984)

== Co ==
- Marivic Co-Pilar, member for Quezon City's 6th district (2022–present)
- Angelica Natasha Co, member for BHW party-list (2019–2025)
- Christopher Co, member for Ako Bicol party-list (2010–2019)
- Zaldy Co, member for Ako Bicol party-list (2019–2025)
- Renee Co, member for Kabataan party-list (2025–present)
- Cesar Cobrador, member for AGAP party-list (2009–2010)
- Eufrocino Codilla Sr., member for Leyte's 4th (2002–2010)
- Carlos Cojuangco, member for Negros Occidental's 4th district (1998–2007), and Tarlac's 1st district (2016–2022)
- Danding Cojuangco, member for Tarlac's 1st district (1969–1972)
- Enrique Cojuangco, member for Tarlac's 1st district (2010–2015)
- Jaime Cojuangco, member of Tarlac's 1st district (2022–present)
- José Cojuangco, member for Tarlac's 1st district (1934–1941, 1945–1946)
- Kimi Cojuangco, member for Pangasinan's 5th district (2010–2016)
- Mark Cojuangco, member for Pangasinan's 5th district (2001–2010, 2022–present)
- Melecio Cojuangco, member for Tarlac's 1st district (1907–1909)
- Peping Cojuangco, member for Tarlac's 1st district (1961–1969, 1987–1998)
- Lex Anthony Colada, member for AAMBIS-Owa party-list (2022–2025)
- Felizardo S. Colambo Sr., member for Youth sector (1992–1998)
- King Collantes, member for Batangas's 3rd district (2025–present)
- Manuel Collantes, member for Batangas (1984–1986)
- Maria Theresa Collantes, member for Batangas's 3rd district (2016–2025)
- Sonny Collantes, member for Batangas's 3rd district (2010–2016)
- Neri Colmenares, member for Bayan Muna party-list (2009–2016)
- Angel Concepcion, member for Nueva Ecija's 2nd district (1965–1972), Region III (1978–1984), and Nueva Ecija (1984–1986)
- Danilo Concepcion, member for Youth sector (1978–1984)
- Hermogenes Concepcion Jr., member for Nueva Ecija's 3rd district (1987–1992)
- Hermogenes Concepcion Sr., member for Nueva Ecija (1922–1925, 1943–1944), Nueva Ecija's 1st district (1928–1931)
- Tomas Concepcion, member for Labor sector (1992–1995)
- Venancio Concepción, member for Cagayan's 1st district (1909–1912)
- Jose Concon, member for Bohol's 1st district (1928–1934)
- Patricio Confesor, member for Iloilo's 3rd district (1949–1953)
- Tomás Confesor, member for Iloilo's 3rd district (1922–1931, 1935–1938)
- Carmen Consing, member for Capiz's 1st district (1953–1957)
- Fulgencio Contreras, member for Ambos Camarines's 2nd district (1909–1912)
- Amando Cope, member for Albay's 1st district (1969–1972)
- Teodulo Coquilla, member for Eastern Samar (2007–2010)
- Miguel Cornejo, member for Mountain Province (1922–1925)
- Alfonso Corominas Jr., member for Region VII (1978–1984)
- Enrique Corpus, member for Zambales (1953–1957)
- Jose Corpus, member for Nueva Ecija's 1st district (1949–1957)
- Pio Corpus, member for Masbate (1928–1934, 1935–1941, 1943–1944)
- Rafael Corpus, member for Zambales (1912–1914)
- Carlos Corrales, member for Misamis's 1st district (1907–1909)
- Manuel Corrales, member for Misamis's 2nd district (1907–1909)
- Bonifacio Cortes, member for Cagayan's 2nd district (1919–1922)
- Inocencio Cortes, member for Surigao (1910–1916)
- Jonas Cortes, member for Cebu's 6th district (2016–2019)
- Jose Cortes, member for Surigao (1943–1944)
- Emilio Cortez, member for Pampanga's 2nd district (1953–1965)
- Juliet Cortuna, member for A Teacher party-list (2010–2019)
- Dale Corvera, member for Agusan del Norte's 2nd district (2022–2025), and Agusan del Norte (2025–present)
- Andres Cosalan, member for Mountain Province's 2nd (1965–1969), Benguet (1969–1972), and Region I (1978–1984).
- Ronald Cosalan, member for Benguet (1995–2001, 2010–2019)
- Maria Carrisa Coscolluela, member for Buhay party-list (2007–2010)
- Nikki Coseteng, member for Quezon City's 3rd district (1987–1992)
- Dalmacio Costas, member for Leyte's 2nd district (1912–1919)

== Cr ==
- Anthony Peter Crisologo, member for Quezon City's 1st district (2019–2022)
- Floro Crisologo, member for Ilocos Sur's 1st district (1946–1957, 1961–1972)
- Vincent Crisologo, member for Quezon City's 1st district (2004–2013, 2016–2019)
- Zenaida Cruz-Ducut, member for Pampanga's 2nd district (1995–2004)
- Cinchona Cruz–Gonzales, member for CIBAC party-list (2007–2016)
- Ading Cruz, member for Taguig's 1st district–Pateros (2022–present)
- Agay Cruz, member for Bulacan's 5th district (2025–present)
- Ambrosio Cruz Jr., member for Bulacan's 5th district (2022–2025)
- Benjamin Cruz, member for BUTIL party-list (1998–2004)
- Erasmo Cruz, member for Bulacan's 1st district (1953–1957)
- Ignacio Cruz, member for Misamis Oriental (1953–1957)
- Rufo Cruz, member for Pangasinan's 3rd district (1912–1916, 1928–1931)
- Teodoro Cruz, member for Pangasinan's 2nd district (1998–2001)
- Edwin Cruzado, member for Cotabato's 1st district (2025–present)

== Cu ==
- Dakila Cua, member for Quirino (2010–2019)
- Guillermo Cua, member for Coop-NATCCO party-list (2004–2010)
- Junie Cua, member for Quirino (1988–1998, 2001–2010, 2019–2022)
- Maria Angeles Cua, member for Quirino (1998–2001)
- Midy Cua, member for Quirino (2022–present)
- Luisa Cuaresma, member for Nueva Vizcaya (2016–2025)
- Venancio Cudilla, member for Iloilo's 5th district (1925–1935)
- Antonio Cuenco, member for Cebu's 5th district (1965–1969), Cebu City (1984–1986), and Cebu City's 2nd district (1987–1998, 2001–2010)
- Mariano Jesús Cuenco, member for Cebu's 5th district (1912–1928)
- Miguel Cuenco, member for Cebu's 5th district (1931–1941, 1945–1946, 1949–1965)
- Nancy Cuenco, member for Cebu City's 2nd district (1998–2001)
- Leo Rafael Cueva, member for Negros Occidental's 2nd district (2013–2022)
- Eufemia Cullamat, member for the Bayan Muna party-list (2019–2022)
- Apolonio Curato, member for Agusan (1935–1941)
