= Philippine House Committee on Appropriations =

Standing committee of the House of Representatives of the Philippines

Committee on Appropriations
- 20th Congress

History
- New session started: July 28, 2025

Leadership
- Chair: Mika Suansing, Lakas since July 29, 2025
- Minority Leader: Vacant since June 30, 2025

Website
- Committee on Appropriations

The Philippine House Committee on Appropriations, or House Appropriations Committee is a standing committee of the Philippine House of Representatives.

== Jurisdiction ==
As prescribed by House Rules, the committee's jurisdiction is on the expenditures of the national government which includes the following:

- Creation or abolition and classification of positions in government
- Determination of salaries, allowances and benefits of government personnel
- Payment of public indebtedness

== Members, 20th Congress ==
Position	Member	Constituency	Party
Chairperson	Mika Suansing	Nueva Ecija–1st	Lakas
Senior Vice Chairperson	Albert Garcia	Bataan–2nd	NUP
Vice Chairpersons	Arnulf Bryan Fuentebella	Camarines Sur–4th	NPC
Vice Chairpersons	Zia Alonto Adiong	Lanao del Sur–1st	Lakas
Vice Chairpersons	Jose C. Alvarez	Palawan–2nd	Lakas
Vice Chairpersons	Mercedes Alvarez–Lansang	Negros Occidental–6th	NPC
Vice Chairpersons	Loreto S. Amante	Laguna–3rd	Lakas
Vice Chairpersons	Rommel T. Angara	Aurora–Lone	LDP
Vice Chairpersons	Bernadette S. Barbers	Surigao del Norte–2nd	Nacionalista
Vice Chairpersons	Anna York Bondoc	Pampanga–4th	Nacionalista
Vice Chairpersons	John Tracy Cagas	Davao del Sur–Lone	Lakas
Vice Chairpersons	Dale Corvera	Agusan del Norte–Lone	Lakas
Vice Chairpersons	Imelda Dimaporo	Lanao del Norte–1st	PFP
Vice Chairpersons	Dette Escudero-Quirante	Sorsogon–1st	NPC
Vice Chairpersons	Maria Angela "Gila" Garcia	Bataan–3rd	NUP
Vice Chairpersons	Alexandria "Queenie" P. Gonzales	Mandaluyong–Lone	NUP
Vice Chairpersons	Cha Hernandez	Calamba–Lone	Lakas
Vice Chairpersons	Ferdinand L. Hernandez	South Cotabato–2nd	PFP
Vice Chairpersons	Monique "Nik" Lagdameo	Makati–1st	MKTZNU
Vice Chairpersons	Leandro Leviste	Batangas–1st	Lakas
Vice Chairpersons	Francisco "Lalo" Matugas	Surigao del Norte–1st	Lakas
Vice Chairpersons	Roger Mercado	Southern Leyte–1st	Lakas
Vice Chairpersons	Romeo S. Momo Sr.	Surigao del Sur–1st	Nacionalista
Vice Chairpersons	JC Rahman Nava	Guimaras–Lone	NUP
Vice Chairpersons	Edwin Ongchuan	Northern Samar–2nd	PFP
Vice Chairpersons	Emmarie "Lolypop" Ouano-Dizon	Mandaue–Lone	Lakas
Vice Chairpersons	Rufus Rodriguez	Cagayan de Oro–2nd	CDP
Vice Chairpersons	Ronald Singson	Ilocos Sur–1st	NPC
Vice Chairpersons	Bella Vanessa B. Suansing	Sultan Kudarat–2nd	PFP
Vice Chairpersons	Joseph S. Tan	Isabela–4th	Lakas
Vice Chairpersons	Keith Micah "Mike" Tan	Quezon–4th	NPC
Vice Chairpersons	Marcelino Teodoro	Marikina–1st	NUP
Vice Chairpersons	Eric Yap	Benguet–Lone	Lakas
Vice Chairpersons	Maricar Zamora	Davao de Oro–1st	Lakas
Members for the Majority	Dennis "Alden" B. Almario	Makati–2nd	MKTZNU
Members for the Majority	Milagros Aquino-Magsaysay	Partylist	USCP
Members for the Majority	Abdulmunir Mundoc Arbison	Sulu–2nd	Lakas
Members for the Majority	Arjo Atayde	Quezon City–1st	Nacionalista
Members for the Majority	Ferdinand "B1" L. Beltran	Partylist	Magbubukid
Members for the Majority	Tsuyoshi Anthony "Hori" Horibata	Camarines Sur–1st	NUP
Members for the Majority	Adolph Edward "Eddiebong" Plaza	Agusan del Sur–2nd	NUP
Members for the Majority	Ralph Tulfo	Quezon City–2nd	PFP
Members for the Majority	Rolando Valeriano	Manila–2nd	NUP
Members for the Minority	Jonathan Clement Abalos	Partylist	4Ps
Members for the Minority	Renee Co	Partylist	Kabataan
Members for the Minority	Chel Diokno	Partylist	Akbayan
Members for the Minority	Paolo Henry Marcoleta	Partylist	SAGIP
Members for the Minority	Allan U. Ty	Partylist	LPGMA

== Historical membership rosters ==
=== 19th Congress ===
Position	Members	Party	Province/City	District
Chairperson	Stella Quimbo	Lakas–CMD	Marikina	2nd
Vice Chairpersons	Angelica Natasha Co	BHW	Party-list	
Vice Chairpersons	Benny Abante	NUP	Manila	6th
Vice Chairpersons	Loreto Acharon	NPC	General Santos	At-large
Vice Chairpersons	Zia Alonto Adiong	Lakas–CMD	Lanao del Sur	1st
Vice Chairpersons	Marlyn "Len" Alonte-Naguiat	Lakas–CMD	Biñan	At-large
Vice Chairpersons	Jose C. Alvarez	NPC	Palawan	2nd
Vice Chairpersons	Jose Aquino II	Lakas–CMD	Agusan del Norte	1st
Vice Chairpersons	Maria Rachel "Baby" Arenas	Lakas–CMD	Pangasinan	3rd
Vice Chairpersons	Claude Bautista	NPC	Davao Occidental	At-large
Vice Chairpersons	Claudine Bautista-Lim	DUMPER	Party-list	
Vice Chairpersons	Menchie "Ching" Bernos	Lakas–CMD	Abra	At-large
Vice Chairpersons	Jil Bongalon	Ako Bicol	Party-list	
Vice Chairpersons	Fernando Cabredo	NUP	Albay	3rd
Vice Chairpersons	Mitch Cajayon-Uy	Lakas–CMD	Caloocan	2nd
Vice Chairpersons	Peter John Calderon	NPC	Cebu	7th
Vice Chairpersons	Luis Campos	NPC	Makati	2nd
Vice Chairpersons	Carl Cari	Lakas–CMD	Leyte	5th
Vice Chairpersons	Arthur "Art" Celeste Sr.	Nacionalista	Pangasinan	1st
Vice Chairpersons	Midy Cua	Lakas–CMD	Quirino	At-large
Vice Chairpersons	Luisa Cuaresma	UNA	Nueva Vizcaya	At-large
Vice Chairpersons	Christopher de Venecia	Lakas–CMD	Pangasinan	4th
Vice Chairpersons	Rachel del Mar	NPC	Cebu City	1st
Vice Chairpersons	Alan Dujali	Lakas–CMD	Davao del Norte	2nd
Vice Chairpersons	Faustino "Inno" Dy V	Lakas–CMD	Isabela	6th
Vice Chairpersons	Ian Paul L. Dy	Lakas–CMD	Isabela	3rd
Vice Chairpersons	Gerry "Gerryboy" Espina	Lakas–CMD	Biliran	At-large
Vice Chairpersons	Arnulf Bryan Fuentebella	NPC	Camarines Sur	4th
Vice Chairpersons	Janette Garin	Lakas–CMD	Iloilo	1st
Vice Chairpersons	Greg Gasataya	NPC	Bacolod	At-large
Vice Chairpersons	Ed Christopher Go	Lakas–CMD	Isabela	2nd
Vice Chairpersons	Ruwel Peter Gonzaga	PFP	Davao de Oro	2nd
Vice Chairpersons	Neptali Gonzales II	NUP	Mandaluyong	At-large
Vice Chairpersons	Teodorico Haresco Jr.	Nacionalista	Aklan	2nd
Vice Chairpersons	Virgilio S. Lacson	Manila Teachers	Party-list	
Vice Chairpersons	Joseph "Jojo" L. Lara	Lakas–CMD	Cagayan	3rd
Vice Chairpersons	Eric Martinez	Independent	Valenzuela	2nd
Vice Chairpersons	Francisco Jose "Bingo" Matugas II	Lakas–CMD	Surigao del Norte	1st
Vice Chairpersons	Romeo S. Momo Sr.	Nacionalista	Surigao del Sur	1st
Vice Chairpersons	Lucille Nava	NUP	Guimaras	At-large
Vice Chairpersons	Janice Salimbangon	NUP	Cebu	4th
Vice Chairpersons	Ronald Singson	NPC	Ilocos Sur	1st
Vice Chairpersons	Horacio Suansing Jr.	PFP	Sultan Kudarat	2nd
Vice Chairpersons	David "Jay-Jay" Suarez	Lakas–CMD	Quezon	2nd
Vice Chairpersons	Jocelyn Sy-Limkaichong	NPC	Negros Oriental	1st
Vice Chairpersons	Samier A. Tan	Lakas–CMD	Sulu	1st
Vice Chairpersons	Toby Tiangco	Partido Navoteño	Navotas	At-large
Vice Chairpersons	Allan U. Ty	LPG Marketers Association	Party-list	
Vice Chairpersons	Alfonso Umali Jr.	Liberal	Oriental Mindoro	2nd
Vice Chairpersons	Baby Vargas-Alfonso	Lakas–CMD	Cagayan	2nd
Vice Chairpersons	Anna Villaraza-Suarez	ALONA	Party-list	
Vice Chairpersons	Joseph Gilbert Violago	NUP	Nueva Ecija	2nd
Vice Chairpersons	Eric Yap	Lakas–CMD	Benguet	At-large
Vice Chairpersons	Divina Grace Yu	Lakas–CMD	Zamboanga del Sur	1st
Vice Chairpersons	Maricar Zamora	Lakas–CMD	Davao de Oro	1st
Vice Chairpersons	Jose Maria Zubiri Jr.	Bukidnon Paglaum	Bukidnon	3rd
Members for the Majority	Rosanna "Ria" Vergara	PDP–Laban	Nueva Ecija	3rd
Members for the Majority	Adrian Jay C. Advincula	NUP	Cavite	3rd
Members for the Majority	Juan Carlos "Arjo" Atayde	Nacionalista	Quezon City	1st
Members for the Majority	Alfel Bascug	NUP	Agusan del Sur	1st
Members for the Majority	Dante S. Garcia	Lakas–CMD	La Union	2nd
Members for the Majority	Maria Angela Garcia	NUP	Bataan	3rd
Members for the Majority	Edwin Gardiola	CWS	Party-list	
Members for the Majority	Gerville "Jinky Bitrics" Luistro	Lakas–CMD	Batangas	2nd
Members for the Majority	Luz Mercado	Lakas–CMD	Southern Leyte	1st
Members for the Majority	Margarita "Migs" Nograles-Almario	PBA	Party-list	
Members for the Majority	Augustina Dominique "Tina" Pancho	NUP	Bulacan	2nd
Members for the Majority	Adolph Edward "Eddiebong" Plaza	NUP	Agusan del Sur	2nd
Members for the Majority	Eduardo "Edu" R. Rama Jr.	Lakas–CMD	Cebu City	2nd
Members for the Majority	Ray T. Reyes	Anakalusugan	Party-list	
Members for the Majority	Marvin D. Rillo	Lakas–CMD	Quezon City	4th
Members for the Majority	Dimszar M. Sali	NUP	Tawi-Tawi	At-large
Members for the Majority	Joseph S. Tan	Lakas–CMD	Isabela	4th
Members for the Majority	Miguel Luis Villafuerte	NUP	Camarines Sur	5th
Members for the Minority	Stephen Paduano	Abang Lingkod	Party-list	
Members for the Minority	Jonathan Clement Abalos	4Ps	Party-list	
Members for the Minority	Bonifacio Bosita	1-Rider	Party-list	
Members for the Minority	Arlene Brosas	GABRIELA	Party-list	
Members for the Minority	Sergio Dagooc	APEC	Party-list	
Members for the Minority	Rodge Gutierrez	1-Rider	Party-list	
Members for the Minority	Wilbert T. Lee	AGRI	Party-list	
Members for the Minority	Marissa "Del Mar" Magsino	OFW	Party-list	
Members for the Minority	Harris Christopher M. Ongchuan	NUP	Northern Samar	2nd

==== Chairperson ====
- Zaldy Co (Ako Bicol) July 2022 – January 13, 2025

=== 18th Congress ===
Position	Members	Party	Province/City	District
Chairperson	Eric Yap	ACT-CIS	Party-list	
Vice Chairpersons	Elenita Milagros Ermita-Buhain	Nacionalista	Batangas	1st
Vice Chairpersons	Joey Salceda	PDP–Laban	Albay	2nd
Vice Chairpersons	Junie Cua	PDP–Laban	Quirino	Lone
Vice Chairpersons	Carlos Cojuangco	NPC	Tarlac	1st
Vice Chairpersons	Jose Tejada	Nacionalista	Cotabato	3rd
Vice Chairpersons	Micaela Violago	NUP	Nueva Ecija	2nd
Vice Chairpersons	Alfred Vargas	PDP–Laban	Quezon City	5th
Vice Chairpersons	Greg Gasataya	NPC	Bacolod	Lone
Vice Chairpersons	Jose Antonio Sy-Alvarado	NUP	Bulacan	1st
Vice Chairpersons	Romeo Jalosjos Jr.	Nacionalista	Zamboanga del Norte	1st
Vice Chairpersons	Horacio Suansing Jr.	NUP	Sultan Kudarat	2nd
Vice Chairpersons	Francisco Jose Matugas II	PDP–Laban	Surigao del Norte	1st
Vice Chairpersons	Jose Enrique Garcia III	NUP	Bataan	2nd
Vice Chairpersons	Ruwel Peter Gonzaga	PDP–Laban	Davao de Oro	2nd
Vice Chairpersons	Rozzano Rufino Biazon	PDP–Laban	Muntinlupa	Lone
Vice Chairpersons	Corazon Nuñez-Malanyaon	Nacionalista	Davao Oriental	1st
Vice Chairpersons	Teodorico Haresco Jr.	Nacionalista	Aklan	2nd
Vice Chairpersons	Luisa Lloren Cuaresma	NUP	Nueva Vizcaya	Lone
Vice Chairpersons	Juliette Uy	NUP	Misamis Oriental	2nd
Vice Chairpersons	Allan Benedict Reyes	PFP	Quezon City	3rd
Vice Chairpersons	Paul Daza	Liberal	Northern Samar	1st
Vice Chairpersons	Jocelyn Sy-Limkaichong	Liberal	Negros Occidental	1st
Vice Chairpersons	Manuel Zubiri	Bukidnon Paglaum	Bukidnon	3rd
Vice Chairpersons	Manuel Sagarbarria	NPC	Negros Oriental	2nd
Vice Chairpersons	Lorna Bautista-Bandigan	NPC	Davao Occidental	Lone
Vice Chairpersons	Peter John Calderon	NPC	Cebu	7th
Vice Chairpersons	Michael John Duavit	NPC	Rizal	1st
Vice Chairpersons	Manuel Jose Dalipe	NPC	Zamboanga City	2nd
Vice Chairpersons	Luis Campos Jr.	NPC	Makati	2nd
Vice Chairpersons	David Suarez	Nacionalista	Quezon	2nd
Vice Chairpersons	Ed Christopher Go	Nacionalista	Isabela	2nd
Vice Chairpersons	Carlo Lisandro Gonzalez	MARINO	Party-list	
Vice Chairpersons	Rudys Caesar Fariñas I	Probinsyano Ako	Party-list	
Vice Chairpersons	Romeo Momo Sr.	CWS	Party-list	
Vice Chairpersons	Vincent Franco Frasco	Lakas	Cebu	5th
Vice Chairpersons	Manuel Zamora	HNP	Davao de Oro	1st
Members for the Majority	Samantha Louise Vargas-Alfonso	NUP	Cagayan	2nd
Members for the Majority	Alyssa Sheena Tan	PFP	Isabela	4th
Members for the Majority	Diego Ty	NUP	Misamis Occidental	1st
Members for the Majority	Strike Revilla	NUP	Cavite	2nd
Members for the Majority	Joy Myra Tambunting	NUP	Parañaque	2nd
Members for the Majority	Faustino Michael Dy V	NUP	Isabela	6th
Members for the Majority	Narciso Bravo Jr.	NUP	Masbate	1st
Members for the Majority	Lorna Silverio	NUP	Bulacan	3rd
Members for the Majority	Fernando Cabredo	PDP–Laban	Albay	3rd
Members for the Majority	Wilfredo Caminero	NUP	Cebu	2nd
Members for the Majority	Adolph Edward Plaza	NUP	Agusan del Sur	2nd
Members for the Majority	Alfelito Bascug	NUP	Agusan del Sur	1st
Members for the Majority	Jose Ong Jr.	NUP	Northern Samar	2nd
Members for the Majority	Rolando Uy	NUP	Cagayan de Oro	1st
Members for the Majority	Divina Grace Yu	PDP–Laban	Zamboanga del Sur	1st
Members for the Majority	Maria Fe Abunda	PDP–Laban	Eastern Samar	Lone
Members for the Majority	Mohamad Khalid Dimaporo	PDP–Laban	Lanao del Norte	1st
Members for the Majority	Janice Salimbangon	NUP	Cebu	4th
Members for the Majority	Glona Labadlabad	PDP–Laban	Zamboanga del Norte	2nd
Members for the Majority	Dulce Ann Hofer	PDP–Laban	Zamboanga Sibugay	2nd
Members for the Majority	Rogelio Pacquiao	PDP–Laban	Sarangani	Lone
Members for the Majority	Joselito Sacdalan	PDP–Laban	Cotabato	1st
Members for the Majority	Henry Villarica	PDP–Laban	Bulacan	4th
Members for the Majority	Geraldine Roman	PDP–Laban	Bataan	1st
Members for the Majority	Ria Christina Fariñas	PDP–Laban	Ilocos Norte	1st
Members for the Majority	Lucille Nava	PDP–Laban	Guimaras	Lone
Members for the Majority	Gerardo Espina Jr.	Lakas	Biliran	Lone
Members for the Majority	Dale Malapitan	PDP–Laban	Caloocan	1st
Members for the Majority	Rosanna Vergara	PDP–Laban	Nueva Ecija	3rd
Members for the Majority	Alan Dujali	PDP–Laban	Davao del Norte	2nd
Members for the Majority	Jumel Anthony Espino	PDP–Laban	Pangasinan	2nd
Members for the Majority	John Reynald Tiangco	Partido Navoteño	Navotas	Lone
Members for the Majority	Lucy Torres-Gomez	PDP–Laban	Leyte	4th
Members for the Majority	Carl Nicolas Cari	PFP	Leyte	5th
Members for the Majority	Gil Acosta	PPP	Palawan	3rd
Members for the Majority	Jose Francisco Benitez	PDP–Laban	Negros Occidental	3rd
Members for the Majority	Maricel Natividad-Nagaño	PRP	Nueva Ecija	4th
Members for the Majority	Emmarie Ouano-Dizon	PDP–Laban	Cebu	6th
Members for the Majority	Josefina Tallado	PDP–Laban	Camarines Norte	1st
Members for the Majority	Jocelyn Fortuno	Nacionalista	Camarines Sur	5th
Members for the Majority	Maximo Dalog Jr.	Nacionalista	Mountain Province	Lone
Members for the Majority	Camille Villar	Nacionalista	Las Piñas	Lone
Members for the Majority	Eugenio Angelo Barba	Nacionalista	Ilocos Norte	2nd
Members for the Majority	Arnold Celeste	Nacionalista	Pangasinan	1st
Members for the Majority	Ramon Guico III	Lakas	Pangasinan	5th
Members for the Majority	Joseph Sto. Niño Bernos	Nacionalista	Abra	Lone
Members for the Majority	Mario Vittorio Mariño	Nacionalista	Batangas	5th
Members for the Majority	Jeffrey Khonghun	Nacionalista	Zambales	1st
Members for the Majority	Eduardo Gullas	Nacionalista	Cebu	1st
Members for the Majority	Michael Gorriceta	Nacionalista	Iloilo	2nd
Members for the Majority	Braeden John Biron	Nacionalista	Iloilo	4th
Members for the Majority	Kristine Alexie Besas-Tutor	Nacionalista	Bohol	3rd
Members for the Majority	Abdulmunir Arbison	Nacionalista	Sulu	2nd
Members for the Majority	Lolita Javier	PFP	Leyte	2nd
Members for the Majority	Rudy Caoagdan	PDP–Laban	Cotabato	2nd
Members for the Majority	Sonny Lagon	Ako Bisaya	Party-list	
Members for the Majority	Ronnie Ong	ANG PROBINSYANO	Party-list	
Members for the Majority	Alfred Delos Santos	ANG PROBINSYANO	Party-list	
Members for the Majority	Hector Sanchez	Lakas	Catanduanes	Lone
Members for the Majority	Rommel Rico Angara	LDP	Aurora	Lone
Members for the Majority	Angelina Tan	NPC	Quezon	4th
Members for the Majority	Jake Vincent Villa	NPC	Siquijor	Lone
Members for the Majority	Noel Villanueva	NPC	Tarlac	3rd
Members for the Majority	Tyrone Agabas	NPC	Pangasinan	6th
Members for the Majority	Solomon Chungalao	NPC	Ifugao	Lone
Members for the Majority	Edward Maceda	PMP	Manila	4th
Members for the Majority	Cheryl Deloso-Montalla	Liberal	Zambales	2nd
Members for the Majority	Elias Bulut Jr.	NPC	Apayao	Lone
Members for the Majority	Ian Paul Dy	NPC	Isabela	3rd
Members for the Majority	Manuel Luis Lopez	NPC	Manila	1st
Members for the Majority	Arnulf Bryan Fuentebella	NPC	Camarines Sur	4th
Members for the Majority	Cesar Jimenez Jr.	PDP–Laban	Zamboanga City	1st
Members for the Majority	Kristine Singson-Meehan	Bileg Ti Ilokano	Ilocos Sur	2nd
Members for the Majority	Abdullah Dimaporo	NPC	Lanao del Norte	2nd
Members for the Majority	Pablo Ortega	NPC	La Union	1st
Members for the Majority	Faustino Michael Carlos Dy III	PFP	Isabela	5th
Members for the Majority	Antonio Albano	NUP	Isabela	1st
Members for the Majority	Yasser Balindong	Lakas	Lanao del Sur	2nd
Members for the Majority	Julienne Baronda	NUP	Iloilo City	Lone
Members for the Majority	Angelica Amante	PDP–Laban	Agusan del Norte	2nd
Members for the Majority	Cyrille Abueg-Zaldivar	PPP	Palawan	2nd
Members for the Minority	Sergio Dagooc	APEC	Party-list	
Members for the Minority	Godofredo Guya	RECOBODA	Party-list	
Members for the Minority	Gabriel Bordado Jr.	Liberal	Camarines Sur	3rd
Members for the Minority	Stella Luz Quimbo	Liberal	Marikina	2nd
Members for the Minority	Angelica Natasha Co	BHW	Party-list	
Members for the Minority	Francisca Castro	ACT TEACHERS	Party-list	
Members for the Minority	Alex Advincula	NUP	Cavite	3rd
Members for the Minority	Isagani Amatong	Liberal	Zamboanga del Norte	3rd
Members for the Minority	Argel Joseph Cabatbat	MAGSASAKA	Party-list	
Members for the Minority	Arnolfo Teves Jr.	PDP–Laban	Negros Oriental	3rd

==== Chairperson ====
- Isidro Ungab (Davao City–3rd, HNP) July 24, 2019 – March 2, 2020

==== Members for the Majority ====
- Marissa Andaya (Note: Died on July 5, 2020.) (Camarines Sur–1st, NPC)
- Francisco Datol Jr. (Note: Died on August 10, 2020.) (SENIOR CITIZENS)
- Nestor Fongwan (Note: Died on December 18, 2019.) (Benguet–Lone, PDP–Laban)

== See also ==
- House of Representatives of the Philippines
- List of Philippine House of Representatives committees
