= Christopher Co =

Filipino politician and businessman (born 1967)

Member of the House of Representatives for Ako Bicol
- In office June 30, 2010 – June 30, 2019 Serving with Rodel Batocabe (2010–2018); Alfredo Garbin (2010–2013, 2016–2019); Ronald S. Ang (2018–2019)

Personal details
- Born: Christopher Salcedo Co; May 3, 1967 (age 59)
- Party: Lakas (2024–present); Ako Bicol (partylist; 2010–present)
- Spouse: Lingling Altavano
- Relations: Zaldy Co (brother)
- Children: Claudine Co; Natasha Co
- Occupation: Politician
- Profession: Businessman
- Known for: CEO and founder of Hi-Tone Construction

Christopher "Kito" Salcedo Co (born May 3, 1967) is a Filipino businessman and politician who served as representative for Ako Bicol Partylist in the House of Representatives of the Philippines.

== Early life ==
Christopher "Kito" Salcedo Co was born on May 3, 1967.

== Business career ==
Christopher Co along with his brother Zaldy founded the Sunwest Construction and Development Corporation (SCDC) in 1997. The business which later renamed as Sunwest Inc., diversified and became involved in the real estate, energy, and tourism industries.

Christopher Co founded Hi-Tone Construction, a contractor which builds flood control and road projects for the Department of Public Works and Highways. Both Sunwest and Hi-Tone have been subject to scrutiny in the 2025 flood control projects controversy. Additionally, Hi-Tone handled the rehabilitation project of Peñaranda Park in Legazpi, Albay. The roofing of then-unfinished stage of the project collapsed on August 30, 2025 amid heavy rains, injuring six people who sought shelter there. The contractor subsequently responded they had given financial assistance to five of the victims, and claimed they were supposed to "reinspect" the project a week before the incident.

== Political career ==
Ako Bicol won three seats at the 2010 elections. Among those who filled the seats was Christopher Co.

In 2019, his brother Zaldy Co has replaced his place in Ako Bicol.

Christopher Co ran in the 2025 elections and vied for the seat of Albay's 2nd district. He promised to focus on agriculture, employment, education as well as the rehabilitation of the Albay Electric Cooperative and solving traffic and water supply problems in the province. He lost to Carlos Loria.

In February 2025, Kontra Daya stated that Ako Bicol was among the 86 out of 155 paty-list groups running in the elections that do not represent the poor or the marginalized, pointing out Ako Bicol's links to big businesses. The Co family has also been described as a political dynasty that includes Christopher Co, Zaldy Co, Diday Co, and Natasha Co. The family runs quarrying operations in Albay, which the Catholic Diocese of Legazpi blames for the destruction of mountains and the 2024 floods during typhoons Kristine and Pepito.

== Personal life ==
Christopher Co's daughter Claudine was an influencer. Claudine Co deactivated her social media accounts after her lavish lifestyle came to wider public attention amid the 2025 flood control project controversy. His other daughter, Natasha, served in the House of Representatives from 2019 to 2025 as the representative of BHW Party-list.
