= November 2025 Iglesia ni Cristo protests =

2025 mass demonstration in Manila, Philippines

Rally for Transparency and a Better Democracy
- Part of the 2025–2026 Philippine anti-corruption protests
- Date: November 16–17, 2025
- Location: Manila, Philippines
- Also known as: Rally for Transparency, Accountability, Justice, and Peace; November 2025 Iglesia ni Cristo protests
- Type: Mass demonstration
- Cause: Flood control projects scandal in the Philippines
- Organized by: Iglesia ni Cristo
- Participants: 650,000 protestors
- Outcome: Iglesia ni Cristo declared stated goals has been met; protests called off a day early

The Rally for Transparency and a Better Democracy, also known as the Rally for Transparency, Accountability, Justice, and Peace, was a protest led by the Iglesia ni Cristo that was held on November 16–17, 2025.

== Background ==
The Iglesia ni Cristo (INC) has announced a three-day demonstrations which it dubbed as the "Rally for Transparency, Accountability, Justice, and Peace" or "Rally for Transparency and a Better Democracy".

While the protests are open to non-members of the INC, Brother Edwil Zabala, spokesman of the INC said that the rally is not meant to "interfere in politics" but to call for everyone involved in the flood control projects scandal to be held accountable. Reforma Filipina and Hakbang Maisug, groups supporting the Dutertes, reportedly expressed interest to join but was barred due to the INC not willing to call for the resignation of President Bongbong Marcos.

There were concerns of a destablization plot against the administration of President Bongbong Marcos ahead of the three-day protest scheduled for November 16 to 18, 2025. The Catholic Bishops' Conference of the Philippines (CBCP) issued a statement to the Armed Forces of the Philippines (AFP) to defend to constitution amidst what it assess as "challenging times". The AFP has pledged it will not take part in "unconstitutional actions" including a coup. The CBPC also cautioned against "political exploitation" ahead of the protests and the recent video statement by Zaldy Co.

Road closures and class suspensions in Manila were imposed by the local government in preparation by the event.

== Protest ==
=== November 16 ===
People began gathering at the Quirino Grandstand on November 16, 2025. INC minister Bienvenido Santiago Jr. has explicitly rejected the proposals for a coup d'état, the installation of a military junta, and the conduct of a snap elections while reiterating the church's stances on the corruption issue.

Senator Rodante Marcoleta, who is an INC member, also spoke at the rally.

Around 6:00pm, around 650,000 people have gathered according to the Manila Police District. The protesters camped out in the venue with around 120,000 attendees still on site as of 10:00 pm.

=== November 17 ===
According to the MPD, there were 600,000 protesters as of 6:00 pm of November 17.

Senator Imee Marcos, who was in attendance, made allegations that her brother and President Bongbong Marcos, as well as First Lady Liza Araneta Marcos and their children use drugs.

The INC prematurely ended the rally which was supposed to end the following day.

== Aftermath ==
INC spokesperson Edwil Zabala, justifying the early end of the protests, stated that the church has attained its goals of calling for "justice, accountability, transparency, and peace" already.

The drug use allegations hurled by Senator Imee Marcos was met with condemnation from the first family, the Office of the President, and other political figures. Senator Ping Lacson called the move as "un-Filipino" for bringing out a "sibling quarrel" to the public.

In the November 18 broadcast of Sa Ganang Mamamayan in Net 25, Zabala said that Senator Imee Marcos' speech against the president is outside the protest's scope on calling for "justice, accountability, transparency, and peace" although he framed Imee's drug use allegations against President Bongbong Marcos as coming from a love of "an older sister" and "love for country".

== Analysis ==
Chito de la Vega has observed that the Iglesia ni Cristo's calls for transparency lack credibility due to the Rally for Transparency and a Better Democracy's inclusion of Senator Rodante Marcoleta as guest speaker, considering Marcoleta's non-disclosure of campaign donations and discrepancies in the senator's statement of contributions and expenditures (SOCE) and statement of assets, liabilities and net worth (SALN).
