= Claudine Co =

Filipino singer and influencer (born 1998)

- Born: Claudine Julia Monique Altavano Co; November 10, 1998 (age 27)
- Education: University of Asia and the Pacific (BA)
- Occupations: Singer; online influencer
- Father: Christopher Co
- Relatives: Natasha Co (sister); Zaldy Co (uncle)

YouTube information
- Years active: Until 2025
- Genre: Lifestyle / Vlog
- Subscribers: 340 thousand
- Musical career
- Instruments: Vocals
- Label: Just Music
- Last updated: 18 September 2025

Claudine Julia Monique Altavano Co (born November 10, 1998) is a Filipino singer and influencer. She is best known for her YouTube vlogs and her song "Giliw" (2021), a collaboration with Yeng Constantino.

In 2025, Co went viral on social media after she shared posts of her luxury items amid the 2024–2025 flood control projects controversy in the Philippines, facing public criticism.

== Early life and education ==
Claudine Julia Monique Altavano Co was born on November 10, 1998. Hailing from Legazpi, Albay, Claudine is the daughter of former Ako Bicol partylist representative, Christopher Co, who co-founded the Hi-Tone Construction and Development Corporation. Her uncle, Zaldy Co, is the incumbent Ako Bicol representative and the former chair of the House Committee on Appropriations. Zaldy is also the chief executive officer of the Sunwest Group of Companies. Co also has three sisters, including former BHW partylist representative Natasha Co. She graduated from the University of Asia and the Pacific with a Bachelor of Arts degree in Entertainment and Media Management.

== Career ==
Co began her career at the age of 12 by experimenting a video, later launching her own YouTube channel at 16. One of her videos, which featured the purchase of a white Mercedes-Benz G-Wagon valued at approximately ₱25 million (US$507,614.21), went viral.

In 2021, she started her music career by signing with the independent label Just Music. She collaborated with Yeng Constantino on the song "Giliw" (transl. Beloved).

=== Flood control project controversy ===
In 2025, Co faced criticisms following her Instagram posts and YouTube "day in the life" vlogs that showcased luxury bags and trips on a private plane with her family. Social media users referred to her as a "nepo baby" and criticized her for displaying a lavish lifestyle. Co has traveled to several countries in Europe and attended the 2022 Fendi Fashion Show in Paris, France. She deleted the post on August 28. She became the subject of memes and she was described as having been "canceled" in online culture.

== Personal life ==
Claudine is in a relationship with Lemuel Lubiano, the brother of Lawrence Lubiano and a relative of former Sorsogon councilor Lester Lubiano.

== Discography ==
=== Singles ===
Title	Year	Album	Ref.
"I Love You Goodbye"	2021	Non-album single	
"Patay Sindi"	2021	Non-album single	
"Giliw"	2023	Non-album single	
"Paano Kung Tayo"	2024	Non-album single	
