= Alfredo Garbin =

Filipino lawyer and politician (born 1976)

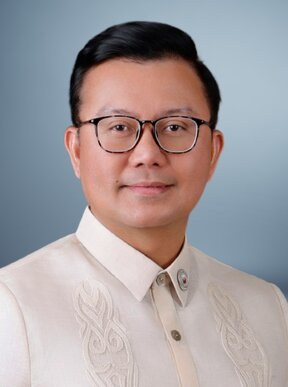
- Official portrait, 2025

Member of the House of Representatives of the Philippines for Ako Bicol
- Incumbent
- Assumed office June 30, 2025 Serving with Elizaldy Co (until 2025) and Jan Franz Chan (since 2026)
- In office June 30, 2016 – June 30, 2022 Serving with Christopher S. Co (2016–19), Rodel Batocabe (2016–18), Ronald S. Ang (2019), Elizaldy Co (2019–22)
- In office June 30, 2010 – June 30, 2013 Serving with Christopher S. Co and Rodel Batocabe

Mayor of Legazpi, Albay
- In office November 12, 2024 – June 30, 2025
- Preceded by: Geraldine Rosal
- Succeeded by: Hisham Isamil

Personal details
- Born: Alfredo Abaroa Garbin; October 3, 1976 (age 49)
- Party: Ako Bicol (2010–present)
- Spouse: Nasreen Ismail
- Children: 3
- Occupation: Lawyer

Alfredo "Pido" Abaroa Garbin Jr. (born October 3, 1976) is a Filipino lawyer and politician former Mayor of Legazpi, Albay. Prior to his mayoral position, he served as a representative for the Ako Bicol party list in the House of Representatives. Garbin assumed leadership of Legazpi after winning the mayoral race, following the disqualification of Geraldine Rosal.

== Early life ==
Alfredo Abaroa Garbin Jr. was born on October 3, 1976, to Alfredo Briguela Garbin Sr. and Rosario Arandia Abaroa.

== Career ==
=== Partylist representative ===
Before becoming mayor, He represented the interests of the Bicol region in the Philippine Congress as a representative of the Ako Bicol party list. His legislative work focused on advancing regional development and addressing the needs of Bicolanos.

=== Mayoral election ===
In the 2022 local elections, Garbin contested the position of Mayor of Legazpi City. Despite initial setbacks, the Commission on Elections (COMELEC) ultimately proclaimed him as the new mayor, succeeding Geraldine Rosal. His victory marked a significant political development in the city.

== Personal life ==
Garbin married Nasreen Ismail and they have three children.
