= Zaldy Co video statement =

2025 Video statement by politician Zaldy Co on budget insertion allegations

- Date: 14–16 & 24–26 November 2025
- Location: Undisclosed location
- Also known as: Zaldy Co confession video
- Type: Online video statement
- Theme: Budget insertion allegations, including flood control projects in the Philippines
- Cause: Response to claims linking Co to ₱100 billion budget insertions
- Motive: To deny personal involvement and redirect allegations toward President Bongbong Marcos and former House Speaker Martin Romualdez
- Target: Government of the Philippines
- Participants: Zaldy Co
- Outcome: Increased public and political scrutiny
- Videos: see #List of videos section

On 14 November 2025, businessman and former member of the House of Representatives Zaldy Co released a first five-minute video statement on his official Facebook page, where he admitted to facilitating what he described as large budget insertions in the proposed 2025 national budget of the Philippines. In the video, Co alleged that the instructions to accommodate the insertions, amounting to around ₱100 billion (US$1.693 billion), came from President Bongbong Marcos and former House Speaker Martin Romualdez. He said the insertions consisted largely of flood control projects, along with other infrastructure works. In the days that followed, Co released more video statements providing further details on his allegations.

After the video was released, some observers speculated that it could have been AI-generated, noting changes in Co's appearance and citing remarks from political figures who called for closer examination. However, a technical team, pointed out that his facial movements, lighting, and audio-video synchronizations were inconsistent and were actually in line with no clear indicators of deepfake technology, suggesting that the recording was made in real time.

Press Secretary at Malacañang Palace Claire Castro was incorrectly quoted as having said, "Let us first check with the National Bureau of Investigation (NBI) regarding the video since it is undoubtedly artificial intelligence (AI). It cannot be true that it was Co." A fact check later found that Castro had not made the statement and had not alleged that Co's video was fabricated or AI-generated.

== Background ==
Zaldy Co previously served as a representative of the AKO Bicol Partylist in the House of Representatives and has been extensively engaged in appropriations negotiations while serving in this capacity. In October 2024, Co stated that the 2023 national budget did not have any billion-peso provision for flood control facilities in the Bicol Region. However, a fact‑check by Vera Files found this assertion to be false. Co has also been named in allegations around anomalous and possibly "ghost" flood‑control projects. Testimony before congressional inquiries linked him to alleged budget insertions, including ₱13.8 billion in proposed 2025 budget allocations, nearly all of which were linked to flood-control projects.

== List of videos ==
No.	Duration	Release date	Notes	Link
1	5:57	14 November 2025	First 3-part video statement	link
2	4:39	15 November 2025	First 3-part video statement	link
3	3:51	16 November 2025	First 3-part video statement	link
4	9:44	17 November 2025	"Unedited" and "full" video statement	link
5	9:01	24 November 2025	"More detailed" 3-part video statement	link
6	6:53	25 November 2025	"More detailed" 3-part video statement	link
7	8:50	26 November 2025	"More detailed" 3-part video statement	link

== Analysis ==
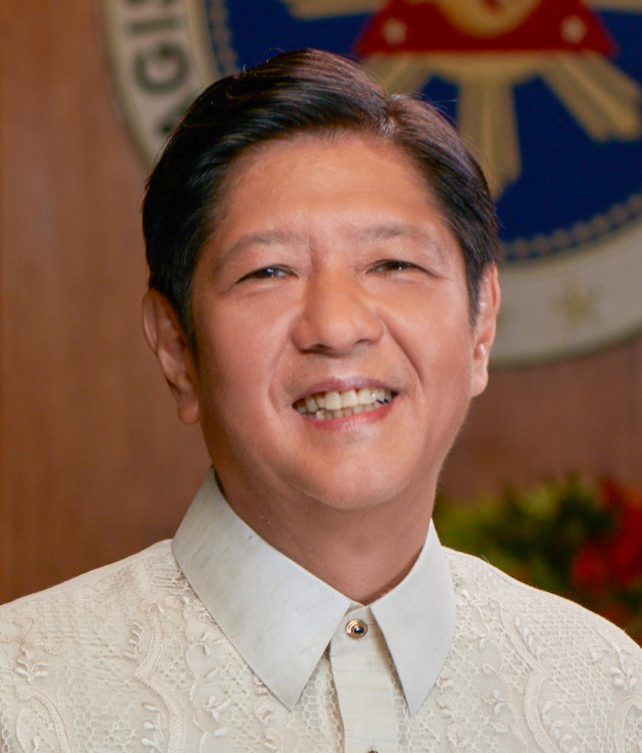
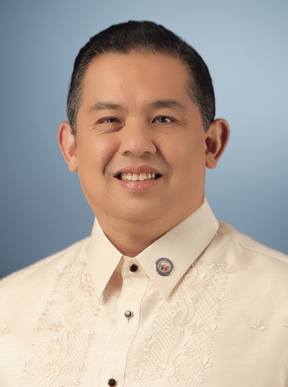
President Bongbong Marcos (left) and former House Speaker Martin Romualdez (right), who were named by Co in his video statement regarding budget insertions and flood control projects.

In the five-minute video, Co explained the alleged budget insertion process and said that he received instructions concerning the inclusion of roughly ₱100 billion (US$1.693 billion) in projects, mostly for flood-control infrastructure and other public works under the Department of Public Works and Highways (DPWH). He alleged that the instructions to accommodate the insertions came from President Marcos and former House Speaker Romualdez. He had left the Philippines on 19 July 2025, for a scheduled medical check-up and had planned to return after President Marcos's State of the Nation Address (SONA), citing health reasons and the pressures surrounding his role in the budget insertion process. He stated that he immediately informed House Speaker Romualdez of the directive, who allegedly asked him to "stay out of the country" and assured him that he would be well taken care of, as instructed by Marcos, and added that he felt he was being made a "poster boy" to deflect attention from other officials.

Co said he believed the orders came from Marcos because Budget Secretary Lucas Bersamin had informed him that the list of projects had been placed in a "brown leather bag". He recalled that it was the same bag Marcos had mentioned when he, Marcos, and Romualdez returned from a trip to Singapore. Co also claimed that he had been pressured to stay silent, saying that government resources were being used to discredit him: "The administration is using the full resources of the country to keep me quiet…I will be used as the cover for their campaign against corruption." He concluded the video by saying he possesses documents supporting the inserted projects and intended to release them publicly.

On 15 November, Co released a four-minute video statement in which he also shared photographs of suitcases that he claimed contained cash allegedly delivered to Romualdez and his cousin, Marcos. He denied receiving any money himself, stating that "all the insertions went to the President and to Romualdez." According to Co, the suitcases were purportedly delivered to Romualdez's residences in North Forbes Park and South Forbes Park, as well as to Malacañang Palace for the President.

On 16 November, Co made the further allegation in the third part of his three-minute video statement, asserting that Romualdez had threatened him as early as March 2025 during an alleged meeting. In the same statement, he further claimed that the kickbacks he received from questionable infrastructure projects amounted to ₱56 billion (US$948 million), compared with the ₱21 billion (US$356 million) previously reported by engineers from the Department of Public Works and Highways (DPWH).

== Reactions ==
Co's statement received immediate attention and reactions from political figures and lawmakers. Senator Leila de Lima called on Co to come back to the country and give sworn testimony about his statements. Members of the House Minority Bloc described his testimony as a "damning exposé", saying that it implicated Marcos in a ₱100 billion budget insertion scandal and called for a formal investigation to determine the validity of the allegations. Senator Win Gatchalian urged the public to exercise caution in evaluating Co's allegations. During a break in the Blue Ribbon Committee hearing on the flood-control anomaly, he said, "I don't even know kung siya ba yun o may nagsasabi (Note: Translation into English language: "I don't even know if that's really him or if someone is just saying...") artificial intelligence. So we need to really validate".

Antonio Tinio, a Representative from the Alliance of Concerned Teachers, likewise called for Marcos to be included in the investigation into the flood control scandal. Meanwhile, the Independent Commission for Infrastructure chose not to make any statements regarding the accusations raised by Co against high-ranking government officials. The Catholic Bishops' Conference of the Philippines said that Filipinos deserve "accountability, not manipulation".

=== Authenticity ===
Following the release of Co's first video statement, some questions were raised about the authenticity of the recording, with calls for it to be checked for possible AI or deepfake manipulation. A technical team later found no evidence of manipulation, citing the consistency of Co's facial movements, lighting, and the synchronization of the video's audio and visuals. A quotation attributed to Malacañang press officer Claire Castro, in which she was alleged to have described Co's video as likely AI-generated, was later found to be false. A fact check by The Philippine Star reported that Castro did not say that the video was fabricated or generated using AI.
