= Natasha Co =

Filipino politician (born 1991)

Angelica Natasha A. Co
- Official portrait, 2022

Member of the House of Representatives of the Philippines from BHW Party-list
- In office June 30, 2019 – June 30, 2025

Personal details
- Born: June 17, 1991 (age 35) Lucena, Quezon, Philippines
- Party: BHW Party-list
- Relations: Claudine Co (sister); Zaldy Co (uncle)
- Parent: Christopher Co (father)
- Education: Ateneo de Manila University; University of Santo Tomas (incomplete); Philippine School of Interior Design
- Occupation: Politician

Angelica Natasha Altavano Co (born June 17, 1991) is a Filipino politician who served as the representative of the BHW Party-list in the House of Representatives of the Philippines from 2019 to 2025.

== Early life and education ==
Angelica Natasha Altavano Co was born on June 17, 1991 in Lucena, Quezon, to a prominent political family. Her father, Christopher Co, served as representative of Ako Bicol party-list, while her uncle, Elizaldy Co, currently holds the same position. Her mother is Lingling Co and she has a sister named Claudine Co, a singer and online influencer.

Co completed her primary education at Legazpi Hope Christian School (1994–2003) and secondary education at Aquinas University of Legazpi Science High School (2003-2007). She earned her Bachelor's degree in Psychology from the Ateneo de Manila University (2007–2011) before briefly attending medical school at the University of Santo Tomas. She later studied interior design at the Philippine School of Interior Design (2012–2015).

== Political career ==
Co has served as the representative of BHW Party-list from 2019 to 2025. During her tenure, she focused on healthcare and social welfare legislation.

Election watchdog Kontra Daya tagged BHW on its list of party-list groups that do not serve marginalized groups and have links to political dynasties, big business, or the police or the military, or have corruption cases, since Co is daughter of former Ako Bicol Rep. Christopher Co while Co's co-nominee Martin Aber Sicat is a shareholder of Aremar Construction Corp. who was investigated for allegedly getting kickbacks worth P81.1 million in government bid-rigging schemes.
