= Jan Franz Chan =

Filipino lawyer and politician (born 1991)

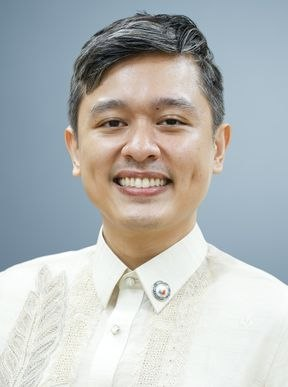
- Official portrait, 2026

Member of the Philippine House of Representatives for Ako Bicol
- Incumbent
- Assumed office January 26, 2026 Serving with Alfredo Garbin
- Preceded by: Zaldy Co

Personal details
- Born: Jan Franz Norbert Joselito Almario Chan; January 24, 1991 (age 35) Quezon City, Philippines
- Party: Ako Bicol (partylist; 2025–present)
- Education: Ateneo de Manila University (BS, JD); University of California, Berkeley (LLM)
- Occupation: Lawyer; real estate broker; politician

Jan Franz Norbert Joselito Almario Chan (born January 24, 1991) is a Filipino lawyer and politician.

== Early life and education ==
Chan was born on January 24, 1991 in Quezon City. He finished a Bachelor of Science in Management, Major in Legal Management in 2011 and Juris Doctor in 2015 at the Ateneo de Manila University. He finished the Master of Laws in Energy & Clean Technology Law at UC Berkeley School of Law in 2018.

== Legal career ==
Jan Franz Chan was a senior partner at ChanRobles & Associates Law Firm and a consultant for the Philippine National Oil Company.

== Political career ==
Ako Bicol won two seats in the House of Representatives following the 2025 elections which was filled in by Zaldy Co and Alfred Garbin. Co, who was implicated in the 2025 flood control project controversy, resigned on September 29, 2025.

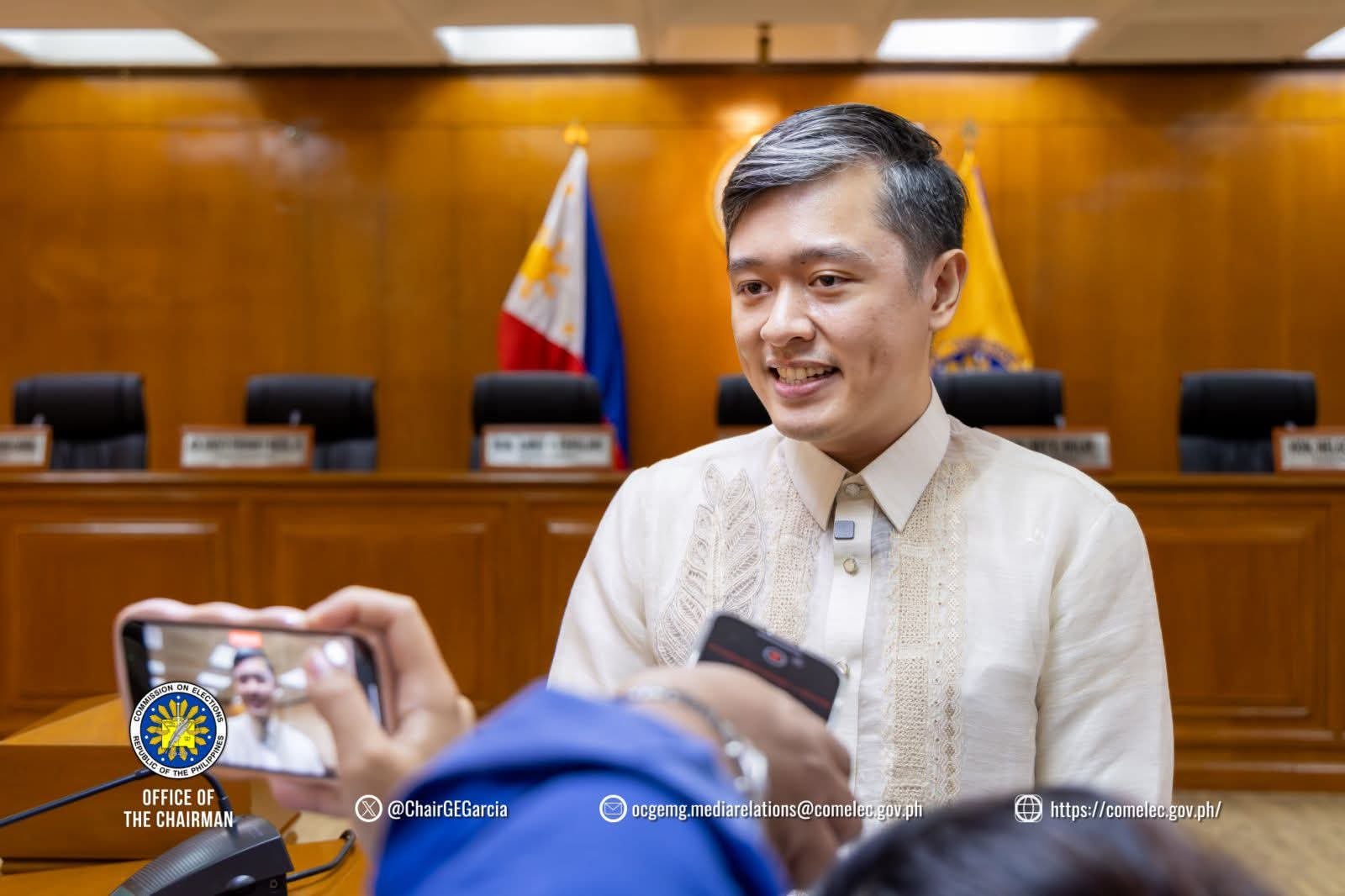
Chan after his proclamation as representative for the Ako Bicol partylist on November 12, 2025.

On November 12, 2025, Chan was proclaimed as Ako Bicol's third nominee replaced Co, when he took his oath as House of Representatives member on January 26, 2026.

He pledged to focus on passing a comprehensive renewable energy law; a bill strengthening mental health support systems, especially for parents of children with special needs, and disaster resilience.

== Personal life ==
Chan hails from Rapu-Rapu, Albay. Aside from being a lawyer, he was also a real estate broker. He also previously worked for the World Wide Fund for Nature.
