= Barangay Health Wellness Partylist =

Political party in the Philippines

Barangay Health Wellness
- — Philippine partylist —
- Full name: Barangay Health Wellness Association Inc.
- Abbreviation: BHW
- Sector(s) represented: Barangay health workers
- Colors: Orange, green

Website
- bhwpartylist.wordpress.com

Barangay Health Wellness (BHW) Association Inc., also known as the BHW Partylist, is an organization which holds party-list representation in the House of Representatives of the Philippines. It aims to represent the interest of barangay health workers (BHWs).

== Background ==
Barangay Health Wellness as a partylist in the House of Representatives designates its primary constituents as barangay health workers. This also includes other people whose responsibilities are related to health at a barangay-level including barangay nutrition scholars (BNSs), barangay sanitary inspectors (BSIs), and barangay service point officers.

In October 2024, BHW Representative Angelica Natasha Co and Congresswoman Stella Quimbo filed an ethics complaint against Wilbert T. Lee, anchored on alleged threats and acts of aggression during a 2025 budget hearing with the Philippine House Committee on Ethics and Privileges.

Election watchdog Kontra Daya tagged BHW on its list of party-list groups that do not serve marginalized groups and have links to political dynasties, big business, or the police or the military, or have corruption cases, since Co is daughter of former Ako Bicol Rep. Christopher Co while Co's co-nominee Martin Aber Sicat is a shareholder of Aremar Construction Corp. who was investigated for allegedly getting kickbacks worth P81.1 million in government bid-rigging schemes.

== Electoral history ==
Barangay Health Wellness sought party-list representation in the House of Representatives by participating in the 2019 election. They were able to secure enough votes for a single seat. The seat was filled in by Angelica Natasha Co, daughter of former Ako-Bicol representative Christopher Co.

The BHW Partylist was able to retain its lone seat for the 19th Congress following the 2022 election.

Election	Votes	%	Seats
2019	269,518	0.97%	1
2022	335,598	0.91%	1
2025	203,719	0.49%	0

== Representatives to Congress ==
Period	Representative
18th Congress; 2019–2022	Angelica Natasha Co
19th Congress; 2022–2025	Angelica Natasha Co
Note: A party-list group, can win a maximum of three seats in the House of Representatives.
