= Jil Bongalon =

Filipino lawyer and politician (born 1991)

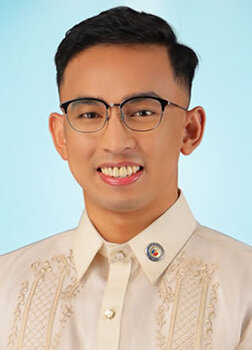
- Official portrait, 2022

Member of the Philippine House of Representatives for Ako Bicol
- In office June 30, 2022 – June 30, 2025 Serving with Elizaldy Co

Personal details
- Born: August 22, 1991 (age 35) Tabaco, Albay, Philippines
- Party: Lakas (2024–present)
- Other political affiliations: Ako Bicol (partylist; 2022–2025)
- Spouse: Frances Abigail Buban (m. 2023)
- Children: 3
- Education: Bicol University; University of Santo Tomas
- Occupation: Politician
- Profession: Lawyer
- Website: jilbongalon.com

Raul Angelo "Jil" Dutollo Bongalon (born August 22, 1991) is a Filipino lawyer and politician. He previously served as a member of the Philippine House of Representatives of the Ako Bicol partylist.

== Early life and education ==
Raul Angelo Dutollo Bongalon was born on August 22, 1991, in Tabaco, Albay.

He finished high school education at Tabaco National High School. He then studied at Bicol University for his under graduate degree. After that, he enrolled at the University of Santo Tomas (UST) Faculty of Civil Law to study Law.

In 2016, Bongalon passed the Philippine Bar Examination and began his career as a lawyer.

== Career ==
=== Legal career ===
After passing the Bar in 2016, Bongalon became a Bar reviewer for Remedial Law, where he coached future lawyers for the Bar exams.

=== Political career ===
==== House of Representatives ====
Bongalon entered national politics as a representative of the Ako Bicol Party-List in the 19th Congress of the Philippines. He took office on June 30, 2022. During his term, he served as:

Vice chairperson of the House Committee on Ethics and Privileges, 2023 to 2025. Vice chairperson of the House Committee on Appropriations, 2022 to 2025.

As a member of the House Committee on Appropriations, he took part in budget deliberations. This included the 2024 budget discussions, where questions were raised about the proposed budget of the office of the Vice President. Bongalon criticized Vice President Sara Duterte for not attending the house budget hearings for her office. He also called for Duterte's resignation.

== Electoral history ==
Electoral history of Jil Bongalon
Year	Office	Party	Votes received				Result
Year	Office	Party	Total	%	P.	Swing	Result
2022	Representative (Party-list)	Ako Bicol	816,445	2.24%	5th	-1.52	Won
2025	Representative (Albay–1st)	Lakas	107,656	45.52%	2nd	—N/a	Lost
