= Rodel Batocabe =

Filipino politician (1966–2018)

The Honorable Rodel Batocabe

Member of the House of Representatives of the Philippines for Ako Bicol
- In office June 30, 2010 – December 22, 2018
- Succeeded by: Ronald Ang

Personal details
- Born: Rodel Masigan Batocabe; April 25, 1966 Daraga, Albay, Philippines
- Died: 22 December 2018 (aged 52) Daraga, Albay, Philippines
- Party: Ako Bicol (partylist)
- Spouse: Gertie Batocabe (m. 1990)
- Occupation: Lawyer, politician

Rodel Masigan Batocabe (April 25, 1966 – December 22, 2018) was a Filipino lawyer, politician, and member of the Ako Bicol Political Party (AKB). Batocabe served in the House of Representatives of the Philippines for three terms from 2010 until his murder in office on December 22, 2018, at a gift-giving event for senior citizens in the village of Burgos, Daraga municipality, Albay. Batocabe was first elected to House of Representatives of the Philippines in 2010, an office he held until his death and was the first sitting member of the House of Representatives to be killed during the administration of Rodrigo Duterte, but he was the 21st Filipino official to be murdered since Duterte's tenure began in 2016. Batocabe was a political ally of President Duterte.

== Early life ==
Rodel Masigan Batocabe was born on April 25, 1966 in Daraga, Albay. He was born eldest among three children to parents from a working class background to Justino De Leon Batocabe, a sanitary inspector who worked for the Municipality of Daraga and Natividad Masigan an elementary public school teacher. Natividad, a career public school teacher instilled in him the values of perseverance, hard work and the value of a good education.

== Education ==
Rodel Masigan Batocabe completed elementary school at the Legazpi City's Benedictine School St. Agnes Academy, adjacent to his hometown Municipality of Daraga, with the award Best in Social Studies in 1978. He then transferred to Dominican School Aquinas University (Now called University Sto Tomas- Legazpi) for secondary education. Here, Batocabe transformed into a student who pursued academic excellence, he was an active student leader and a consistent scholar graduating class valedictorian in 1982.

After graduating High School Batocabe moved to Quezon City and was enrolled in University of the Philippines Diliman topping the College Scholastic Aptitude Test (CSAT), the National College Entrance Examination and the National Science and Technology Authority Scholarship Examination and even ranked in the top 100 scholars nationwide. Initially, Batocabe would take up engineering as his course even topping the 1982 University of the Philippines Geodetic Engineering Scholarship Examination but despite this he would later shift to take up BS Economics and earn a bachelor's degree with honors in 1986. He then received his law degree from the University of the Philippines College of Law in 1991 being awarded the Most Outstanding Law Intern in the same year and passing the bar exam in 1992. He also has a master's degree in public administration from the University of the Philippines Diliman.

== Legal career ==
Batocabe started his legal career as the Associate Partner for the Chavez Laureta and Associates Law Offices. He became part of the firm, which had been known due to its courageous and zealous advocacy for its clients. He was mentored for four years by two outstanding UP alumni, the late former Solicitor General, Atty Francisco "Frank" Chavez and Atty. Jose C. Laureta who served as the Commissioner of the Presidential Commission on Good Government (PCGG) administration of the late former Pres. Corazon Aquino.

In February 1995, Batocabe teamed up with his fellow UP Law friends and opened up the Roque Butuyan Batocabe & Gangoso Law Offices (RBBGLO) in Makati City. Batocabe became the firms managing partner and his primary assignment was civic works with secondary on corporate litigations, power generation, telecommunications, environmental law, and corporate special projects. They were once described by an American lawyer as "the most troublesome small law firm in the Philippines." The partnerships lasted five years until June 1997 when Batocabe decided it was time to focus on his own career and life.

On July 7, 1997 he opened up the Batocabe & Associates Law Offices as a solo proprietorship. In July 2001 the firm transferred to Ortigas Center, Pasig City where it is still located today. Through the years, business grew as the firm began to be recognized for specialty in civic works. At the zenith of its operations the firm mostly concentrated on corporate, civil, administrative, transportation and banking laws. Its four lawyers and twelve employees handled sensational high profile and extra-ordinary cases that hugged the headlines in the early and mid-2000s such as the Tradition Homes and Development Corporation, Madlambayan-Dimson Realty and Development Corporation, Cole Energy and Mining Corporation, Philippine Merchant Marine School Inc., RPA Communicate, Inc., Infosoft Solutions, Inc., Anjene Industries, Inc., and A.D. Lawrence's Inc.

== Political career ==
=== Before Congress ===
In January 2007, two months after Typhoon Reming struck the Bicol Region, Batocabe was elected president of the S.O.S Bicol Foundation Inc., a nongovernmental organization of entrepreneurs and professionals who aimed to help fellow Bicolanos in times of disaster and a precursor to the Ako Bicol Party (AKB). Batocabe spearheaded the relief operations along with his colleagues, even chartered a commercial plane to send relief goods to Legazpi City. Batocabe rejuvenated the role of the private sectors in disaster work that included rescue, retrieval and relief missions. Batocabe also started the Tarabangan Tugang and led its first regional relief program outside Albay province when Mt. Bulusan erupted in July 2007 causing thousands to seek refuge outsides the volcano's danger zone. He also led relief efforts to help Metro Manila cities devastated by Typhoon Ondoy in 2009 bringing with him 30 vehicles of donations and equipment.

=== 2010 Elections ===
The AKB topped the survey ahead of Buhay Hayaan Yumabong and Bayan Muna.

== Murder ==
In 2018 Batocabe announced his candidacy for mayor of Daraga for the May 2019 general elections. He would have challenged incumbent Carlwyn Baldo, who was also seeking re-election (under Lakas).

On December 22, 2018, Batocabe was attending a gift giving event for senior citizens in Barangay Burgos Daraga. Two men approached Batocabe and shot him eight times. His police escort, Officer Orlando Diaz, was also killed while seven elderly attendees were wounded in the attack. Batocabe and Diaz were taken to a hospital in Legazpi, where both were pronounced dead. Batocabe was buried in Daraga on December 31.

On January 3, 2019, police announced that Baldo had ordered the killing of Batocabe. According to the police, Baldo hired six men to kill Batocabe and set up $95,000 in funds to pay for the murder. The plot had allegedly been in the works since August 2018, when Baldo supplied $4,600 to one of the hitmen to purchase guns and motorcycles. Baldo denied the allegations, calling himself "a convenient scapegoat." Later that year, an arrest warrant was issued against Baldo, who posted bail. On 27 August 2024, Baldo was arrested after another warrant was issued against him.

== See also ==
- List of Philippine legislators who died in office
