= Zaldy Co =

Filipino businessman and politician (born 1970)

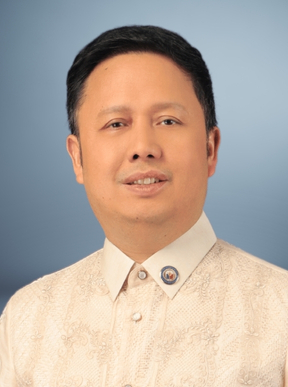
- Official portrait, 2025

Member of the Philippine House of Representatives for Ako Bicol
- In office June 30, 2019 – September 29, 2025 Serving with Jil Bongalon (2022–2025); Alfredo Garbin (2025)
- Succeeded by: Jan Chan

Chair of the House Appropriations Committee
- In office July 25, 2022 – January 13, 2025
- Preceded by: Eric Yap
- Succeeded by: Stella Quimbo

Personal details
- Born: Elizaldy Salcedo Co; December 8, 1970 (age 55) Legazpi, Albay, Philippines
- Party: Ako Bicol (partylist; since 2018)
- Spouse: Mylene Recinto (m. 1999)
- Relations: Christopher Co (brother); Natasha Co (niece); Claudine Co (niece)
- Children: 4
- Education: AMA Computer College (BS); Aquinas University (MBA)
- Occupation: Politician, businessman
- Known for: CEO, Sunwest Group of Companies; Chairman, Misibis Bay Resort
- Criminal information
- Criminal charges: Graft (2 counts); Malversation of public funds
- Capture status: Fugitive
- Wanted by: Department of the Interior and Local Government (DILG)
- Wanted since: November 21, 2025

Elizaldy "Zaldy" Salcedo Co (born December 8, 1970) is a Filipino businessman, politician, and fugitive who previously served as a representative for the Ako Bicol Partylist in the House of Representatives of the Philippines from 2019 until his resignation in 2025. He is also the chief executive officer of the Sunwest Group of Companies and Chairman of the Board of Misibis Bay Resort in Bacacay, Albay.

== Early life and education ==
Co was born on December 8, 1970, in Legazpi, Albay, as the fifth child among six children of Delfin Co and Elsie Salcedo. He completed his primary education at Bicol University College of Education Integrated Laboratory School in Legazpi in 1982 and his secondary education at St. Gregory the Great Seminary in Tabaco in 1986. He earned his bachelor's degree in computer engineering from AMA Computer College and later completed his Master of Business Administration at Aquinas University in 1998.

== Business career ==
Zaldy Co along with his brother Christopher "Kito" Co founded the Sunwest Construction and Development Corporation (SCDC) in 1997. The business which was later renamed as Sunwest Inc., diversified and became involved in the real estate, energy, and tourism industries.

On January 31, 2002, a cargo ship owned by Co sank in Albay Gulf due to strong waves it encountered while transporting a bulldozer from Santo Domingo to Bacacay, Albay; although six of its passengers swam to safety, one 65-year-old passenger went missing.

In the 2000s, Co's Sunwest was linked to government flood control and road projects under the administration of President Gloria Macapagal Arroyo. Sunwest is among the top contractors of the Department of Public Works and Highways. In May 2007, Albay vice governor Jesus "James" Calisin claimed that several Department of Public Works and Highways (DPWH) river projects awarded to the Co siblings' companies were being fraudulently implemented, with funds meant for the rehabilitation of Albay in the aftermath of Typhoons Milenyo and Reming alleged to have been redirected for use in the 2007 elections. According to Calisin, one of the projects involved the channeling of a non-existent river in the town of Malilipot. Albay governor Fernando Gonzales had previously attempted to meet several times with DPWH Bicol officials for better coordination on infrastructure projects in the province, but they consistently ignored his invitations.

In 2008, Co proposed the establishment of three mini hydroelectric power plants in the province of Catanduanes, which were supported by Governor Joseph Cua but opposed by energy commissioner Rodolfo Albano Jr.; it was soon approved by the Department of Energy, and by 2011 two of the three plants built by Co's company Suweco were in operation.

In 2009, Sunwest acquired the Hyatt Regency Hotel of Jose Mari Chan in Pasay. The hotel reopened as Midas Hotel and Casino in December 2010.

In 2013, the DPWH infrastructure projects acquired by the Co sibling's companies Sunwest and Hi-Tone received scrutiny after numerous "completed" projects in Albay were found to be unfinished despite them already being paid in full. A year later, both construction companies were investigated by the Commission on Audit for their potential involvement in the pork barrel scam after each of them were found to have received over ₱1 billion worth of DPWH projects from 2009 to 2010 that were funded by the Priority Development Assistance Fund of congressmen.

From 2016 to 2025, Sunwest bagged ₱86.1 billion worth of contracts, almost half of which are in the Bicol Region. His company secured contracts including landslide facilities for the Bicol International Airport.

Co divested from SCDC in 2019 but remains a beneficial owner.

== House of Representatives ==
The party-list Ako Bicol, chaired by Co and aiming to represent the people of Bicol Region, was accredited by the Commission on Elections (COMELEC) in 2009. By this time, Co had reportedly been close to President Gloria Macapagal Arroyo and her husband Jose Miguel, with the party-list group Bayan Muna filing a disqualification case against Ako Bicol on claims that it was merely a front for the Arroyos. Election watchdog Kontra Daya alleged that Arroyo created Kontra Daya to add to her allies in Congress. Nevertheless, Ako Bicol topped the party-list election in 2010, garnering its first three nominees (including Co's brother Christopher) seats in the House of Representatives. In late 2012, COMELEC attempted to disqualify Ako Bicol and three other party-list groups for not representing a marginalized sector, but was given a status quo ante order by the Supreme Court halting its suspension of the party-lists.

=== 18th Congress ===
Co was inaugurated as a representative for the Ako Bicol party-list in the House of Representatives of the Philippines on June 30, 2019. He approached president Rodrigo Duterte to expedite the completion of the Bicol International Airport.

=== 19th Congress ===
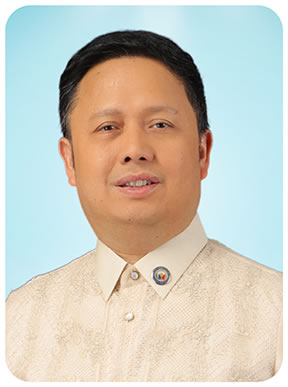
Official portrait taken in 2022 for the 19th Congress

In the 19th Congress which began in 2022, he was appointed as the chairperson of the House Committee on Appropriations. House Speaker Martin Romualdez personally appointed Co, a known Marcos ally, to head the appropriations committee. He was removed from the position in January 2025. Co authored 524 bills during the 19th Congress.

From 2023 to 2025, the highest amount of "allocable" funds were given to the Representative Sandro Marcos, President's son, and Romualdez, the President's cousin. "Allocable" funds in the national budget approved by Congress have been criticized by the People’s Budget Coalition as a new form of pork barrel, since it goes to "politically determined projects that crowd out more equitable and accountable public spending". Unprogrammed appropriations (UA) and confidential and intelligence fund (CIF) under the Office of the President were also tagged as forms of corruption-prone pork barrel funds.

In February 2023, Co was endorsed by the term-limited Joey Salceda as his successor as Albay's 2nd district representative. However, Co remained a nominee of Ako Bicol for the 2025 election.

=== 2025 elections ===
In February 2025, Kontra Daya stated that Ako Bicol was among the 86 out of 155 paty-list groups running in the elections that do not represent the poor or the marginalized, pointing out Ako Bicol's links to big businesses. The Co family has also been described as a political dynasty that includes Zaldy Co, Christopher Co, Diday Co, and Angelica Natasha Co. The family runs quarrying operations in Albay, which the Catholic Diocese of Legazpi blames for the destruction of mountains and the 2024 floods during typhoons Kristine and Pepito.

=== 20th Congress ===
Co retained his seat in the lower house for the 20th Congress, which started in July 2025. However, he did not attend any plenary session since the house convened on July 28, 2025. Co, due to his ownership of the contractor firm Sunwest, has been implicated in the 2025 flood control projects scandal. Co went to the United States, citing medical treatment as his reason. On September 19, newly elected House Speaker Bojie Dy revoked Co's travel license, demanding his return to the Philippines within 10 days to answer allegations against him. However, on September 29, Co resigned as a member of the House of Representatives.

Co and Romualdez were criticized for their involvement in the 2025 General Appropriations Act (GAA), which critics alleged as one of the most flawed and corrupt spending measures ever approved.

== Controversies ==
=== Pharmally and DepEd laptop controversy ===
In February 2024, Senate Majority Leader Joel Villanueva raised concerns about Co's company, Sunwest Corporation, alleging its involvement in the Pharmally scandal and a controversial Department of Education laptop deal. This came after Co referenced a dismissed ombudsman case against Villanueva, who countered by presenting evidence suggesting his signature was forged. In 2025, the Office of the Ombudsman charged Department of Education executives for buying overpriced and outdated laptops from Sunwest in 2021.

=== National budget dispute ===
In September 2024, Co, along with other lawmakers, disputed Vice President Sara Duterte's claim that only two officials controlled the national budget. Co described the statement as a "scam attempt" and emphasized that budget decisions were made collectively. He also criticized Duterte for not attending a hearing on the Office of the Vice President's proposed budget.

=== Involvement in the flood control funding controversy ===
In October 2024, Co faced scrutiny over statements regarding flood control funding in the Bicol region. A Vera Files fact-check revealed that he had misrepresented the funding situation by claiming no billion-peso funding was allocated for flood control projects, while the Department of Public Works and Highways had received ₱1.3 billion for such efforts in 2023. Co later defended the administration's strategy, explaining that funding was redirected toward water impounding facilities to improve food security.

Construction firms linked to Co's family received flood contracts worth ₱15.7 billion while Co headed the House appropriations committee, which decides on the national budget. Co is co-founder of Sunwest, Inc. while his brother Christopher Co is co-founder of Hi-Tone and his sister Farida Co is co-founder of FS Co, all firms with large government contracts.

On September 18, 2025, House Speaker Bojie Dy revoked Co's travel clearance and ordered him to return to the Philippines. The DPWH ordered the Anti-Money Laundering Council (AMLC) to freeze ₱4.7-billion worth in air assets, including several luxury planes, owned by companies linked to Co. On September 26, the Department of Justice (DOJ) said it was requesting an International Police (Interpol) Blue Notice to help locate Co. On September 25, his Wikipedia page was vandalized for two hours, with his surname altered from "Co" to "Co-rakot". (Note: A pun on the Filipino word "kurakot", which translates in English to "corrupt".) On September 29, 2025, Co resigned as a member of the House of Representatives representing the Ako Bicol partylist amid allegations of massive corruption in connection with flood control projects and insertions in the national budget, accusations that he has repeatedly denied while abroad.

On November 14, 2025, Co released a five-minute video admitting he facilitated budget insertions in the 2025 national budget. He claimed the directive to include about ₱100 billion, largely for flood control projects, came from President Bongbong Marcos and former House Speaker Martin Romualdez. On November 21, 2025, the Sandiganbayan released warrants of arrest and hold departure orders against Co and 17 other individuals over the flood-control project controversy, particularly that in Oriental Mindoro. On November 24, 2025, DILG Secretary Jonvic Remulla confirmed that the requested Interpol Blue Notice has been issued against Co.

On January 8, 2026, the Bureau of Customs seized Co's eight luxury cars worth ₱145 million.

On April 16, 2026, Co was arrested in Prague, Czech Republic for entering the country without proper documentation and has since been detained.

On April 28, 2026, Justice Secretary Fredderick Vida confirmed that Co is no longer in Czech custody but still in the Schengen area. Subsequently, Palace Press Officer Claire Castro stated that Co is currently seeking asylum in France.

== Personal life ==
Co has been married to Mylene Recinto since 1999. They have four children.

== Electoral history ==
Electoral history of Zaldy Co
Year	Office	Party	Votes received				Result
Year	Office	Party	Total	%	P.	Swing	Result
2019	Representative (Party-list)	Ako Bicol	1,049,040	3.76%	3rd	—N/a	Won
2022	Representative (Party-list)	Ako Bicol	816,445	2.24%	5th	-1.52	Won
2025	Representative (Party-list)	Ako Bicol	1,073,119	2.56%	6th	+0.32	Won
