= Ako Bicol =

Political party in the Philippines

- — Philippine partylist —
- Full name: Ako Bicol Political Party
- Abbreviation: AKB
- Chairperson: Zaldy Co
- Type: Political party
- Founded: 2006; 20 years ago
- COMELEC accreditation: 2009; 17 years ago
- Headquarters: Legazpi, Albay
- Ideology: Regionalism (Bicolano)
- Slogan: Sinda... Kita... Ika...

Current representation (20th Congress)
- Seats in the House of Representatives: 2 / 3 (Out of 63 party-list seats)
- Representative(s): Alfredo Garbin; Jan Franz Chan

Website
- akobicolpartylist.com

The Ako Bicol Political Party (AKB) is a political party in the Philippines participating in the party-list elections in the Philippines. It represents the Bicol Region and the Bicolano people. In the 2016 elections, AKB was the top partylist with 1,664,975 votes, earning it 3 seats in Congress.

== Background ==
AKB is a movement composed of individuals who are either residents of the Bicol Region, born of Bicolano parents, have resided in Bicol or simply interested in the promotion of the welfare and interests of the region and its people, collectively known as "Bicolanos," with the aim to unite Bicolanos to work in the development of the Bicol Region through programs and projects that will combat poverty, provide adequate social services, promote full employment, guarantee social justice and full respect for human rights, recognize the sanctity of human life, improve delivery of health services, democratize access to education and training, protect the environment, enhance disaster preparedness and advance the participation of youth, women, gays and lesbians and physically challenged individuals as well senior citizens in nation building.

AKB also endeavors to instill confidence and foster patriotism among Bicolanos through the promotion of Bicol history, arts and culture, appreciation of the role of Bicolano heroes, national figures and other role models in the historical and cultural development of the region and strengthening the inherent resiliency of Bicolanos amidst adversities but at the same time, minimizing and if not totally eradicating, perceived attitudes and values which tend to hamper progress and development.

== History ==
=== Before 2010 ===
AKB started as a non-government organization under the name "SOS Bicol," which provided rescue aid to residents in the Bicol region after Typhoon Reming (Durian) hit; it also sponsored livelihood programs for residents affected by the 2009 eruption of the Mayon Volcano.

=== 2010 elections ===
In a May 2010 Social Weather Stations opinion poll, AKB topped the survey, with 5.64% of the vote, the equivalent of two seats, beating seasoned party-list election contenders Buhay Hayaan Yumabong and Bayan Muna. However, AKB has been accused by the Kontra Daya (Against Cheating) group of being a creation of President Gloria Macapagal Arroyo to expand her base of allies in the House of Representatives, a charge that AKB denied.

AKB emerged as the surprising topnotcher in the 2010 election, one of only two parties (the other being 1st Consumers Alliance for Rural Energy) above the threshold not to have previously sat in Congress. However, in a Bicol Mail column by Luis Ruben General, stated that AKB merely duplicates the work of the district representatives. A disqualification case was filed against the party, claiming that the party had violated the party-list system law since the party was backed by the Co family, which owns construction companies, malls and resorts in Bicol, and therefore "cannot represent the marginalized and underrepresented sector," according to the disqualification petition.

On May 31, 2010, the Commission on Elections (COMELEC) declared several groups to have won seats under the party-list system, but the proclamations of AKB's seats (and those of several other parties) were deferred due to the pending disqualification cases against them. On July 28, it was announced that the COMELEC had dismissed all petitions against AKB, saying that party-list system law allows for regional political parties that do not represent a particular sector of society. The original petition was dismissed on June 29, but the original petitioners did not file a motion for reconsideration until July 26, after deadline for filing motions has lapsed. This allowed the commission to proclaim Ako Bicol's three nominees as congressmen.

=== 2013 elections ===
On October 10, 2012, COMELEC announced that AKB (along with 12 other parties) was disqualified from running in the 2013 party-list election by a unanimous 6–0 vote of commission members. The commission cited the party's failure to represent a specific sector of society, a requirement for parties fielding candidates under the sectoral representation (party list) system. AKB Representative Alfredo Garbin Jr. expressed surprise at the decision. On November 13, 2012, the Supreme Court granted a petition filed by AKB to forestall COMELEC acting on its decision.

=== 2016 elections ===
In the 2016 elections, Ako Bicol won 1,664,975 votes (5.14% of the national vote), the highest votes for any party in the election, while winning three seats in total, making it the party's most successful election.

=== Death of Congressman Rodel M. Batocabe ===
In 2018, Rodel Batocabe announced that he would not seek re-election to the House of Representatives. Instead, Batocabe announced his candidacy for mayor of Daraga in Albay province in the forthcoming May 2019 general elections. He would have challenged Daraga Mayor Carlwyn Baldo, who was also seeking re-election in 2019.

On December 22, 2018, Batocabe was attending a gift giving event for senior citizens in the small village of Burgos in Daraga, Albay. Two men approached Batocabe, who was 52 years-old, at the event and shot him eight times. His police escort, Officer Orlando Diaz, was also killed, while seven elderly attendees were also wounded in the attack. Batocabe and Diaz were taken to a hospital in Legazpi City, where both were pronounced dead. By coincidence, December 22 also marked Batocabe's wedding anniversary to his wife, Gertie.

On January 3, 2019, it was announced that Daraga Mayor Carlwyn Baldo had ordered the killing of Rep. Batocabe. At the time of his murder, Batocabe was running for mayor of Daraga, while Baldo was seeking re-election. According to the police, Baldo hired six men to kill Batocabe and set up $95,000 in funds to pay for the murder. The plot had allegedly been in the works since August 2018, when Baldo supplied $4,600 to one of the hitmen to purchase guns and motorcycles. Mayor Carlwyn Baldo denied the allegations in a statement read over the phone to local radio stations, calling himself " a convenient scapegoat."

Atty. Ronald S. Ang took his oath on January 15, 2019, to replace slain lawmaker Rodel Batocabe as the representative of the party. Ang took his oath before Speaker Gloria Macapagal Arroyo and joined Christopher Co and Alfredo Garbin Jr. as representatives of the party-list in the 17th Congress.

=== 2022 elections ===
Ako Bicol was among three party-list groups claiming to represent marginalized sectors that aired advertisements worth hundreds of millions of pesos. From January 2021 to March 2022, Ako Bicol broadcast ads worth ₱243.70 million.

=== 2025 elections ===
In February 2025, Kontra Daya stated that Ako Bicol was among the 86 out of 155 paty-list groups running in the elections that do not represent the poor or the marginalized, pointing out Ako Bicol's links to big businesses. The Co family has also been described as a political dynasty that includes Zaldy Co, Christopher Co, Diday Co, and Angelica Natasha Co. The family runs quarrying operations in Albay, which the Catholic Diocese of Legazpi blames for the destruction of mountains and the 2024 floods during typhoons Kristine and Pepito.

=== Flood control funding controversy ===
In October 2024, Co faced scrutiny over statements regarding flood control funding in the Bicol region. A Vera Files fact-check revealed that he had misrepresented the funding situation by claiming no billion-peso funding was allocated for flood control projects, while the Department of Public Works and Highways had received ₱1.3 billion for such efforts in 2023. Co later defended the administration's strategy, explaining that funding was redirected toward water impounding facilities to improve food security.

Construction firms linked to Co's family received flood contracts worth ₱15.7 billion while Co headed the House appropriations committee, which decides on the national budget. Co is co-founder of Sunwest, Inc. while his brother Christopher Co is co-founder of Hi-Tone and his sister Farida Co is co-founder of FS Co, all firms with large government contracts.

On September 18, 2025, House Speaker Bojie Dy revoked Co's travel clearance and ordered him to return to the Philippines. The DPWH ordered the Anti-Money Laundering Council (AMLC) to freeze ₱4.7-billion worth in air assets, including several luxury planes, owned by companies linked to Co. On September 26, the Department of Justice (DOJ) said it was requesting an International Police (Interpol) Blue Notice to help locate Co. On September 25, his Wikipedia page was vandalized for two hours, with his surname altered from "Co" to "Co-rakot". (Note: A pun on the Filipino word "kurakot", which translates in English to "corrupt".) On September 29, 2025, Co resigned as a member of the House of Representatives representing the Ako Bicol partylist amid allegations of massive corruption in connection with flood control projects and insertions in the national budget, accusations that he has repeatedly denied while abroad.

On November 14, 2025, Co released a five-minute video admitting he facilitated budget insertions in the 2025 national budget. He claimed the directive to include about ₱100 billion, largely for flood control projects, came from President Bongbong Marcos and former House Speaker Martin Romualdez. On November 21, 2025, the Sandiganbayan released warrants of arrest and hold departure orders against Co and 17 other individuals over the flood-control project controversy, particularly that in Oriental Mindoro. On November 24, 2025, DILG Secretary Jonvic Remulla confirmed that the requested Interpol Blue Notice has been issued against Co.

On January 8, 2026, the Bureau of Customs seized Co's eight luxury cars worth ₱145 million.

On April 16, 2026, Co was arrested in Prague, Czech Republic for entering the country without proper documentation and has since been detained.

On April 28, 2026, Justice Secretary Fredderick Vida confirmed that Co is no longer in Czech custody but still in the Schengen area. Subsequently, Palace Press Officer Claire Castro stated that Co is currently seeking asylum in France.

== Electoral results ==
Election	Votes	%	Secured Seats	Party-List Seats	Congress	1st Representative	2nd Representative	3rd Representative
2010	1,058,691	5.20%	3 / 3	57	15th Congress; 2010–2013	Christopher Co	Rodel Batocabe	Alfredo Garbin
2013	763,103	2.67%	2 / 3	58	16th Congress; 2013–2016	Christopher Co	Rodel Batocabe	—N/a
2016	1,664,975	5.14%	3 / 3	59	17th Congress; 2016–2019	Rodel Batocabe (Note: Died in office.) Ronald S. Ang (Note: Assumed office on January 16, 2019)	Christopher Co	Alfredo Garbin
2019	1,049,040	3.76%	2 / 3	61	18th Congress; 2019–2022	Alfredo Garbin	Zaldy Co	—N/a
2022	816,445	2.22%	2 / 3	63	19th Congress; 2022–2025	Zaldy Co	Jil Bongalon	—N/a
2025	1,073,119	2.56%	2 / 3	63	20th Congress; 2025–2028	Zaldy Co (Note: Resigned from office on September 29, 2025) Jan Franz Chan (Note: Assumed office on January 26, 2026)	Alfredo Garbin	—N/a
Note: A party-list group, can win a maximum of three seats in the House of Representatives.
