= Kontra Daya =

Philippine election watchdog group

- Purpose: Election monitoring
- Website: kontradaya.org

Kontra Daya (Against Fraud) is an election watchdog based in the Philippines. The organization counts teachers, members of the clergy, information technology experts, and activists among its members. Member organizations include scientists' organization Advocates of Science and Technology for the People (Agham), Alliance of Concerned Teachers, Blogwatch.ph, Computer Professionals Union, Health Action for Human Rights, Health Alliance for Democracy, Kawani Kontra Daya, and Promotion of Church People's Response.

The organization, patterned after international poll watchers' groups, aims to expose cheating and other forms of electoral fraud.

The late activist priest Joe Dizon served as one its convenors.

Kontra Daya conducts studies on political dynasties that field candidates in elections for party-list representatives.

== See also ==
- Parish Pastoral Council for Responsible Voting
- National Movement for Free Elections
