= List of female members of the House of Representatives of the Philippines =

This is a list of women members of House of Representatives of the Philippines. It is a guide to identify the women in the Philippines who have served as members of the House of Representatives of the Philippines, and its related versions.

The list is chronologically grouped according to the convocation of the Philippine Congress in which members were elected. Included in this list are members of the Philippine Constitutional Convention of 1971, the Batasang Bayan, which functioned as the de facto legislature from 1976 to 1978, the Interim and Regular Batasang Pambansa, which functioned as the unicameral legislature during the administration of President Ferdinand Marcos from 1978 until its abolition in 1986, and the Philippine Constitutional Commission of 1986.

An asterisk (*) denotes they were elected to the legislature for the first time.

== Records ==
The first woman to be elected as a member of the Philippine Congress was Elisa Ochoa, who was elected in the 1941 Philippine general election for the 1st Congress of the Commonwealth of the Philippines. However, she was only able to take office in 1945, following the end of World War II, as its inauguration was interrupted by the Japanese Occupation. During that period, Ochoa was also the only female legislator in the National Assembly of the Japanese-installed Second Philippine Republic from 1943 to 1945.

Remedios Ozamis Fortich was the first woman to become a member of the post-independence House of Representatives, in 1946.

Tecla San Andres Ziga, who was elected in a special election in 1955, was the first congresswoman to win reelection, in 1957.

Geraldine Roman is the first and only trans woman to be elected to the House, in 2016.

Daisy Avance Fuentes was the first woman to become Deputy Speaker of the House of Representatives of the Philippines, from 1998 to 2001. Bella Angara was the first woman to become House Majority Leader, from 2000 to 2001. Gloria Macapagal-Arroyo was the first woman to become Speaker of the House, from 2018 to 2019. She also become one of only two people to hold at least three of the four highest offices in the Philippines: vice president, president, and house speaker, alongside former President Sergio Osmeña.

== Per legislative term ==
=== 2nd National Assembly (1938–1941) ===
None

=== 1st Commonwealth Congress (1941; 1945–1946) ===
Member	Party	Province/City (district)
Elisa Ochoa*	Nacionalista	Agusan (at-large)

=== National Assembly (Second Philippine Republic, 1943–1945) ===
Member	Party	Province/City (district)
Elisa Ochoa	KALIBAPI	Agusan (at-large)

=== 2nd Commonwealth Congress (1946)/1st Congress of the Republic of the Philippines (1946–1949) ===
Member	Party	Province/City (district)
Remedios Ozamis Fortich* (Note: Assumed office after winning special election held on March 11, 1947.)	Liberal	Bukidnon (Lone)

=== 2nd Congress (1949–1953) ===
Member	Party	Province/City (district)
Medina Lacson de Leon*	Nacionalista	Bataan (Lone)

=== 3rd Congress (1954–1957) ===
Member	Party	Province/City (district)
Tecla San Andres Ziga* (Note: Elected in a special election on November 8, 1955)	Liberal	Albay (1st)
Carmen Dinlasang Consing*	Nacionalista	Capiz (1st)

=== 4th Congress (1958–1961) ===
Member	Party	Province/City (district)
Tecla San Andres Ziga	Liberal	Albay (1st)

=== 5th Congress (1962–1965) ===
Member	Party	Province/City (district)
Josefina Duran*	Liberal	Albay (3rd)
Gloria Tabiana* (Note: Elected in a special election on November 9, 1964.)	Liberal	Iloilo (3rd)
Juanita Nepomuceno*	Liberal	Pampanga (1st)

=== 6th Congress (1966–1969) ===
Member	Party	Province/City (district)
Josefina Duran	Liberal	Albay (3rd)
Aurora Abad*	Liberal	Batanes (Lone)
Gloria Tabiana	Liberal	Iloilo (3rd)
Magnolia Antonino* (Note: Elected to the Senate on November 14, 1967.)	Independent	La Union (1st)
Salud Vivero Parreño*	Nacionalista	Leyte (2nd)
Juanita Nepomuceno	Liberal	Pampanga (1st)

=== 7th Congress (1970–1972) ===
Member	Party	Province/City (district)
Gloria Tabiana	Nacionalista	Iloilo (3rd)
Salud Vivero Parreño (Note: Died before start of term)	Nacionalista	Leyte (2nd)
Corazon Primicias* (Note: Removed on January 24, 1972 after an electoral protest.)	Nacionalista	Pangasinan (3rd)

=== Constitutional Convention (1971–1972) ===
Member	Province/City (district)
Teresita Flores	Albay (3rd)
Lilia de Lima	Camarines Sur (2nd)
Lydia Rodriguez	Cebu (1st)
Linda Ampatuan	Maguindanao (Lone)
Sonia Aldeguer	Iloilo (5th)
Carmencita Reyes	Marinduque (Lone)
Elizabeth Johnston	Misamis Occidental (Lone)
Mary Rose Ezpeleta	Rizal (1st)
Fanny Garcia	Surigao del Norte (Lone)
Mercedes Teodoro	Tarlac (1st)
Maria Clara Lobregat	Zamboanga del Sur (Lone)

=== Batasang Bayan (1976–1978) ===
Note: The members of the Batasang Bayan were not elected. Instead, President Ferdinand Marcos appointed members of the Cabinet and local executives to the body, which functioned as an advisory council.

Member	Constituency
Estefania Aldaba-Lim	Cabinet (Secretary of Social Services and Development)
Cecil Carag	Region II
Socorro de Castro	Region V
Lilia de Lima	Region V
Susan dela Rosa	Region XI
Marivic Guevarra	Youth
Elizabeth Marcos-Keon	Region I
Consuelo Madrigal	Region IV
Imelda Marcos	Region IV
Sofia Reyes	Region I
Catherine Singson	Region I

=== Interim Batasang Pambansa (1978–1984) ===
==== Regional Representatives ====
Member	Party	Region
Mercedes Teodoro*	KBL	Region III
Imelda Marcos*	KBL	Region IV
Helena Benitez*	KBL	Region IV-A
Soledad Dolor*	KBL	Region IV-A
Carmencita Reyes*	KBL	Region IV-A
Socorro Reyes*	KBL	Region V
Dolores Sison*	KBL	Region V
Felicidad Santos*	KBL	Region XI

==== Cabinet Representative ====
Member	Party	Position
Sylvia Montes*	KBL	Minister of Social Services and Development

==== Sectoral Representatives ====
Member	Sector	Region
Judy Carunungan*	Youth	At-large
Princess Porti Pacasum*	Industrial Labor	Mindanao

=== Regular Batasang Pambansa (1984–1986) ===
Member	Party	Province/City (district)
Helena Benitez	KBL	Cavite (at-large)
Nenita Cortes-Daluz*	UNIDO	Cebu (at-large)
Merced Edith Rabat*	KBL	Davao Oriental (at-large)
Imee Marcos*	KBL	Ilocos Norte (at-large)
Eva Estrada-Kalaw*	UNIDO	Manila (at-large)
Carmencita Reyes	KBL	Marinduque (at-large)
Amelia Gordon*	KBL	Olongapo (at-large)
Juanita Nepomuceno	UNIDO	Pampanga (at-large)
Cecilia Muñoz-Palma*	UNIDO	Quezon City (at-large)
Mercedes Teodoro	KBL	Tarlac (at-large)

==== Sectoral Representatives ====
Member	Sector	Region
Maria Victoria Calderon*	Youth	At-large

=== Constitutional Commission (1986) ===
Note: The members of the Philippine Constitutional Commission of 1986 were not elected. Instead, President Corazon Aquino invited the public in April 1986 to submit nominations to the body who were then endorsed by various political groups and sectors. The final list of members was released on 25 May 1986.

Member	Leadership Positions
Cecilia Muñoz-Palma	President
Felicitas Aquino	
Florangel Rosario-Braid	Chair of the Committee on General Provisions
Maria Teresa Nieva	Chair of the Committee on Social Justice and Social Services
Minda Luz Quesada	Vice Chair of the Committee on Privileges
Sister Mary Christine Tan	

=== 8th Congress (1987–1992) ===
==== District Representatives ====
Member	Party	Province/City (district)
Charito Plaza*	UNIDO	Agusan del Norte (1st)
Socorro Acosta*	Liberal	Bukidnon (1st)
Violeta Labaria*	PDP–Laban	Bukidnon (2nd)
Benedicta Roa*	LnB	Cagayan de Oro (Lone)
Thelma Almario*	PDP–Laban	Davao Oriental (2nd)
Maria Consuelo Puyat-Reyes*	PDP–Laban	Makati (Lone)
Tessie Aquino-Oreta*	UNIDO	Malabon-Navotas (Lone)
Carmencita Reyes	Independent	Marinduque (Lone)
Luz Cleta Bakunawa*	Independent	Masbate (2nd)
Hortensia Starke*	LnB	Negros Occidental (6th)
Lorna Verano-Yap*	LnB	Pasay (Lone)
Nikki Coseteng*	Kababaihan para sa Inang Bayan	Quezon City (3rd)
Rosette Lerias* (Note: Declared election winner on December 4, 1991.)	KBL	Southern Leyte (Lone)
Glenda Ecleo*	UNIDO	Surigao del Norte (1st)
Katherine Gordon*	Nacionalista	Zambales (1st)
Pacita Gonzales*	LnB	Zambales (2nd)
Maria Clara Lobregat*	Independent	Zamboanga City (Lone)

==== Sectoral Representatives ====
Member	Sector
Estrella Juco* (Note: Died on July 7, 1989)	Disabled
Adelize Raymundo*	Labor

=== 9th Congress (1992–1995) ===
==== District Representatives ====
Member	Party	Province/City (district)
Charito Plaza	Lakas	Agusan del Norte (1st)
Elnorita Tugung*	Lakas	Basilan (Lone)
Milagros Trinidad-Laurel*	Nacionalista	Batangas (3rd)
Venice Borja-Agana*	Lakas	Bohol (1st)
Socorro Acosta	Liberal	Bukidnon (1st)
Aurora Henson*	NPC	Caloocan (1st)
Maria Elena Palma-Gil*	NPC	Davao Oriental (1st)
Thelma Almario	Lakas	Davao Oriental (2nd)
Tessie Aquino-Oreta	LDP	Malabon-Navotas (Lone)
Rosenda Ann Ocampo*	NPC	Manila (6th)
Carmencita Reyes	Lakas	Marinduque (Lone)
Luz Cleta Bakunawa	LDP	Masbate (2nd)
Hortensia Starke	NPC	Negros Occidental (6th)
Andrea D. Domingo*	Lakas	Pampanga (3rd)
Luwalhati Antonino*	Lakas	South Cotabato (1st)
Daisy Avance Fuentes*	Lakas	South Cotabato (2nd)
Glenda Ecleo	Lakas	Surigao del Norte (1st)
Katherine Gordon	Nacionalista	Zambales (1st)
Maria Clara Lobregat	LDP	Zamboanga City (Lone)
Belma Cabilao*	LDP	Zamboanga del Sur (3rd)

==== Sectoral Representatives ====
Member	Sector
Minerva Laudico*	Women
Leonor Luciano*	Women

=== 10th Congress (1995–1998) ===
==== District Representatives ====
Member	Party	Province/City (district)
Charito Plaza	Lakas	Agusan del Norte (1st)
Bella Angara*	LDP	Aurora (Lone)
Milagros Trinidad-Laurel	Lakas	Batangas (3rd)
Venice Borja-Agana	Lakas	Bohol (1st)
Socorro Acosta	Liberal	Bukidnon (1st)
Nerissa Corazon Soon-Ruiz*	LDP	Cebu (6th)
Maria Elena Palma-Gil	Lakas	Davao Oriental (1st)
Thelma Almario	LDP	Davao Oriental (2nd)
Imelda Marcos (Note: Took office on October 27, 1995, after the Supreme Court dismissed the disqualification case filed against her for supposedly failing to meet residency requirements.)	KBL	Leyte (1st)
Tessie Aquino-Oreta	LDP	Malabon-Navotas (Lone)
Rosenda Ann Ocampo	NPC	Manila (6th)
Carmencita Reyes	Lakas	Marinduque (Lone)
Vida Espinosa*	LDP	Masbate (1st)
Luz Cleta Bakunawa	NPC	Masbate (2nd)
Herminia Ramiro*	Liberal	Misamis Occidental (2nd)
Julita Lorenzo-Villareal*	LDP	Nueva Ecija (4th)
Zenaida Cruz-Ducut*	Lakas	Pampanga (2nd)
Luwalhati Antonino	Lakas	South Cotabato (1st)
Daisy Avance Fuentes	Lakas	South Cotabato (2nd)
Maria Clara Lobregat	LDP	Zamboanga City (Lone)
Belma Cabilao	LDP	Zamboanga del Sur (3rd)

==== Sectoral Representatives ====
Member	Sector
Minerva Laudico	Women
Leonor Luciano	Women
Anna Periquet*	Youth
Evelyn Dunuan (Note: Did not assume seat in Congress despite being confirmed by the Commission on Appointments)	Youth

=== 11th Congress (1998–2001) ===
==== District Representatives ====
Member	Party	Province/City (district)
Krisel Lagman-Luistro*	LDP	Albay (1st)
Norma Imperial* (Note: Died on September 29, 2000)	LAMMP	Albay (2nd)
Bella Angara	LDP	Aurora (Lone)
Nancy Cuenco*	LDP	Cebu City (2nd)
Maria Elena Palma-Gil	Lakas	Davao Oriental (1st)
Imee Marcos	KBL	Ilocos Norte (2nd)
Grace Singson*	LDP	Ilocos Sur (2nd)
Ninfa Garin*	LAMMP	Iloilo (1st)
Uliran Joaquin*	LAMMP	Laguna (1st)
Maria Victoria Locsin*	LAMMP	Leyte (4th)
Maria Catalina Loreto-Go*	LAMMP	Leyte (5th)
Rosenda Ann Ocampo	NPC	Manila (6th)
Vida Espinosa	LAMMP	Masbate (1st)
Josephine Dominguez*	LDP	Mountain Province (Lone)
Edith Yotoko-Villanueva*	LDP	Negros Occidental (3rd)
Josefina Joson*	NPC	Nueva Ecija (1st)
Julita Lorenzo-Villareal	LAMMP	Nueva Ecija (4th)
Maria Amelita Villarosa* (Note: Unseated on August 29, 2000 after an electoral protest)	Lakas	Occidental Mindoro (Lone)
Zenaida Cruz-Ducut	NPC	Pampanga (2nd)
Maria Angela Cua*	LAMMP	Quirino (Lone)
Luwalhati Antonino	LAMMP	South Cotabato (1st)
Daisy Avance Fuentes	NPC	South Cotabato (2nd)
Aurora Cerilles*	LAMMP	Zamboanga del Sur (2nd)

==== Party-list Representatives ====
Member	Party-list
Pat Sarenas*	Abanse! Pinay
Etta Rosales*	Akbayan

=== 12th Congress (2001–2004) ===
==== District Representatives ====
Member	Party	Province/City (district)
Gabrielle Calizo*	LDP	Aklan (Lone)
Krisel Lagman-Luistro	Lakas	Albay (1st)
Bella Angara	LDP	Aurora (Lone)
Eileen Ermita-Buhain*	Lakas	Batangas (1st)
Victoria Hernandez-Reyes*	Lakas	Batangas (3rd)
Lorna Silverio*	Lakas	Bulacan (3rd)
Reylina Nicolas*	Lakas	Bulacan (4th)
Celia Taganas-Layus*	NPC	Cagayan (2nd)
Nerissa Corazon Soon-Ruiz	Alayon	Cebu (6th)
Emmylou Taliño-Mendoza*	Independent	Cotabato (1st)
Corazon Nuñez Malanyaon*	NPC	Davao Oriental (1st)
Imee Marcos	KBL	Ilocos Norte (2nd)
Uliran Joaquin	NPC	Laguna (1st)
Faysah Dumarpa*	Lakas	Lanao del Sur (1st)
Cynthia Villar*	Independent	Las Piñas (Lone)
Trinidad Apostol*	Lakas	Leyte (2nd)
Carmen Cari*	Lakas	Leyte (5th)
Maria Victoria Locsin* (Note: Unseated on December 10, 2002 following an electoral protest)	NPC	Leyte (4th)
Vida Espinosa	Lakas	Masbate (1st)
Herminia Ramiro	Liberal	Misamis Occidental (2nd)
Josefina Joson	NPC	Nueva Ecija (1st)
Josephine Sato*	Lakas	Occidental Mindoro (Lone)
Charity Leviste*	Liberal	Oriental Mindoro (2nd)
Zenaida Cruz-Ducut	Lakas	Pampanga (2nd)
Connie Dy*	Lakas	Pasay (Lone)
Lynnette Punzalan*	Liberal	Quezon (2nd)
Aleta Suarez*	Liberal	Quezon (3rd)
Georgilu Yumul-Hermida*	Liberal	Quezon (4th)
Maria Theresa Defensor*	Liberal	Quezon City (3rd)
Nanette Castelo-Daza*	Lakas	Quezon City (4th)
Darlene Antonino-Custodio*	NPC	South Cotabato (1st)
Glenda Ecleo	Lakas	Surigao del Norte (1st)
Soraya Jaafar*	Lakas	Tawi-Tawi (Lone)
Cecilia Jalosjos-Carreon* (Note: Elected in a special election on August 26, 2002.)	Reporma	Zamboanga del Norte (1st)
Filomena San Juan*	Lakas	Zamboanga del Sur (2nd)
Belma Cabilao	Lakas	Zamboanga Sibugay (Lone)

==== Party-list Representatives ====
Member	Party-list
Etta Rosales	Akbayan
Sunny Rose Madamba*	APEC
Liza Maza*	Gabriela

=== 13th Congress (2004–2007) ===
==== District Representatives ====
Member	Party	Province/City (district)
Angelica Amante*	Lakas	Agusan del Norte (2nd)
Henedina Abad*	Liberal	Batanes (Lone)
Eileen Ermita-Buhain	Lakas	Batangas (1st)
Victoria Hernandez-Reyes	Lakas	Batangas (3rd)
Lorna Silverio	Lakas	Bulacan (3rd)
Reylina Nicolas	Lakas	Bulacan (4th)
Nerissa Corazon Soon-Ruiz	KAMPI	Cebu (6th)
Emmylou Taliño-Mendoza	Nacionalista	Cotabato (1st)
Corazon Nuñez Malanyaon	KAMPI	Davao Oriental (1st)
Imee Marcos	KBL	Ilocos Norte (2nd)
Janette Garin*	Lakas	Iloilo (1st)
Judy Syjuco*	Liberal	Iloilo (2nd)
Uliran Joaquin	NPC	Laguna (1st)
Faysah Dumarpa	Lakas	Lanao del Sur (1st)
Cynthia Villar	Nacionalista	Las Piñas (Lone)
Remedios Petilla*	Lakas	Leyte (1st)
Trinidad Apostol	Lakas	Leyte (2nd)
Carmen Cari	Lakas	Leyte (5th)
Bai Sendig Dilangalen*	PMP	Maguindanao (1st)
Rizalina Seachon-Lanete*	NPC	Masbate (3rd)
Herminia Ramiro	Lakas	Misamis Occidental (2nd)
Josefina Joson	NPC	Nueva Ecija (1st)
Maria Amelita Villarosa	KAMPI	Occidental Mindoro (Lone)
Anna York Bondoc*	Nacionalista	Pampanga (4th)
Mary Ann Susano*	Lakas	Quezon City (2nd)
Nanette Castelo-Daza	Lakas	Quezon City (4th)
Darlene Antonino-Custodio	NPC	South Cotabato (1st)
Glenda Ecleo	Lakas	Surigao del Norte (1st)
Mitos Magsaysay*	Lakas	Zambales (1st)
Cecilia Jalosjos-Carreon	PDSP	Zamboanga del Norte (1st)
Belma Cabilao	Lakas	Zamboanga Sibugay (Lone)

==== Party-list Representatives ====
Member	Party-list
Risa Hontiveros*	Akbayan
Etta Rosales	Akbayan
Sunny Rose Madamba	APEC
Liza Maza	Gabriela
Leonila Chavez*	Butil
Estrella Santos* (Note: Took office on January 31, 2007.)	Veterans

=== 14th Congress (2007–2010) ===
==== District Representatives ====
Member	Party	Province/City (district)
Cecilia Seares-Luna*	Lakas	Abra (Lone)
Herminia Roman	Lakas	Bataan (1st)
Eileen Ermita-Buhain	Lakas	Batangas (1st)
Victoria Hernandez-Reyes	Lakas	Batangas (3rd)
Victoria Sy-Alvarado*	Lakas	Bulacan (1st)
Lorna Silverio	Lakas	Bulacan (3rd)
Reylina Nicolas	Lakas	Bulacan (4th)
Sally Ponce Enrile*	NPC	Cagayan (1st)
Mitzi Cajayon*	Lakas	Caloocan (2nd)
Liwayway Vinzons-Chato*	Liberal	Camarines Norte (Lone)
Nerissa Corazon Soon-Ruiz	Nacionalista	Cebu (6th)
Emmylou Taliño-Mendoza	Lakas	Cotabato (1st)
Thelma Almario	Lakas	Davao Oriental (2nd)
Glenda Ecleo	Lakas	Dinagat Islands (Lone)
Janette Garin	Lakas	Iloilo (1st)
Judy Syjuco	Lakas	Iloilo (2nd)
Evita Arago*	Liberal	Laguna (3rd)
Faysah Dumarpa	Nacionalista	Lanao del Sur (1st)
Cynthia Villar	Nacionalista	Las Piñas (Lone)
Trinidad Apostol	Lakas	Leyte (2nd)
Carmen Cari	Lakas	Leyte (5th)
Abigail Binay*	PDP–Laban	Makati (2nd)
Josephine Lacson-Noel* (Note: Took office on November 17, 2009.)	NPC	Malabon–Navotas (Lone)
Zenaida Angping*	NPC	Manila (3rd)
Trisha Bonoan-David*	Lakas	Manila (4th)
Carmencita Reyes	Liberal	Marinduque (Lone)
Rizalina Seachon-Lanete	NPC	Masbate (3rd)
Marina Clarete*	Nacionalista	Misamis Occidental (1st)
Herminia Ramiro	Lakas	Misamis Occidental (2nd)
Jocelyn Sy-Limkaichong*	Liberal	Negros Oriental (1st)
Czarina Umali*	Lakas	Nueva Ecija (3rd)
Maria Amelita Villarosa	Lakas	Occidental Mindoro (Lone)
Anna York Bondoc	Nacionalista	Pampanga (4th)
Maria Rachel Arenas*	Lakas	Pangasinan (3rd)
Mary Ann Susano	PMP	Quezon City (2nd)
Nanette Castelo-Daza	Liberal	Quezon City (4th)
Adeline Rodriguez-Zaldarriaga*	NPC	Rizal (2nd)
Sharee Ann Tan*	Lakas	Samar (2nd)
Darlene Antonino-Custodio	NPC	South Cotabato (1st)
Lani Cayetano*	Nacionalista	Taguig (2nd)
Monica Prieto-Teodoro*	Lakas	Tarlac (1st)
Mitos Magsaysay	Lakas	Zambales (1st)
Beng Climaco*	Liberal	Zamboanga City (1st)
Cecilia Jalosjos-Carreon	Lakas	Zamboanga del Norte (1st)
Belma Cabilao	Lakas	Zamboanga Sibugay (1st)
Dulce Ann Hofer*	Lakas	Zamboanga Sibugay (2nd)

==== Party-list Representatives ====
Member	Party-list
Daryl Grace Abayon*	Aangat Tayo
Catalina Leonen-Pizarro*	ABS
Risa Hontiveros	Akbayan
Maria Clarissa Coscolluela*	Buhay
Leonila Chavez (Note: Died on January 29, 2010.)	Butil
Cinchona Gonzales*	CIBAC
Luzviminda Ilagan*	Gabriela
Liza Maza	Gabriela
Maria Lourdes Arroyo*	Ang Kasangga
Estrella Santos	Veterans
Carol Jane Lopez*	YACAP

=== 15th Congress (2010–2013) ===
==== District Representatives ====
Member	Party	Province/City (district)
Maria Jocelyn Bernos*	Liberal	Abra (Lone)
Angelica Amante	Liberal	Agusan del Norte (2nd)
Maria Valentina Plaza*	NUP	Agusan del Sur (1st)
Evelyn Plaza-Mellana*	NUP	Agusan del Sur (2nd)
Eleanor Bulut Begtang*	NPC	Apayao (Lone)
Herminia Roman	Liberal	Bataan (1st)
Henedina Abad	Liberal	Batanes (Lone)
Victoria Sy-Alvarado	NUP	Bulacan (1st)
Linabelle Villarica*	Liberal	Bulacan (4th)
Baby Aline Vargas-Alfonso* (Note: Assumed office on March 16, 2011, after winning a special election)	NUP	Cagayan (2nd)
Mitzi Cajayon	NUP	Caloocan (2nd)
Jane Castro*	NUP	Capiz (2nd)
Lani Mercado*	Lakas	Cavite (2nd)
Rachel del Mar*	Liberal	Cebu City (1st)
Maria Carmen Zamora*	Liberal	Compostela Valley (1st)
Nancy Catamco*	Liberal	Cotabato (2nd)
Mylene Garcia-Albano*	Liberal	Davao City (2nd)
Thelma Almario	Lakas	Davao Oriental (2nd)
Imelda Marcos	KBL	Ilocos Norte (2nd)
Janette Garin	Liberal	Iloilo (1st)
Ana Cristina Go*	Nacionalista	Isabela (2nd)
Evita Arago	Liberal	Laguna (3rd)
Imelda Dimaporo*	NPC	Lanao del Norte (1st)
Fatima Aliah Dimaporo*	NPC	Lanao del Norte (1st)
Lucy Torres-Gomez*	Liberal	Leyte (4th)
Bai Sandra Sema*	Liberal	Maguindanao (1st)
Monique Lagdameo*	UNA	Makati (1st)
Abigail Binay	PDP–Laban	Makati (2nd)
Josephine Lacson-Noel	NPC	Malabon–Navotas (Lone)
Zenaida Angping	NPC	Manila (3rd)
Trisha Bonoan-David	NUP	Manila (4th)
Rosenda Ann Ocampo	Liberal	Manila (6th)
Mercedes Alvarez*	Liberal	Negros Occidental (6th)
Jocelyn Sy-Limkaichong	Liberal	Negros Oriental (1st)
Czarina Umali	Liberal	Nueva Ecija (3rd)
Maria Amelita Villarosa	Lakas	Occidental Mindoro (Lone)
Gloria Macapagal-Arroyo*	Lakas	Pampanga (2nd)
Anna York Bondoc	Nacionalista	Pampanga (4th)
Maria Rachel Arenas	Liberal	Pangasinan (3rd)
Gina de Venecia*	NPC	Pangasinan (4th)
Kimi Cojuangco*	NPC	Pangasinan (5th)
Marlyn Primicias-Agabas*	NPC	Pangasinan (6th)
Imelda Calixto-Rubiano*	Liberal	Pasay (Lone)
Milagrosa Tan*	NPC	Samar (2nd)
Daisy Avance Fuentes	NPC	South Cotabato (2nd)
Nur-Ana Sahidulla*	NPC	Sulu (2nd)
Susan Yap*	NPC	Tarlac (2nd)
Mitos Magsaysay	UNA	Zambales (1st)
Beng Climaco	Liberal	Zamboanga City (1st)
Aurora Cerilles	NPC	Zamboanga del Sur (2nd)

==== Party-list Representatives ====
Member	Party-list
Zenaida Maranan* (Note: Assumed office on October 9, 2012, after the resignation of Homer Mercado)	1-UTAK
Julieta Cortuna*	A TEACHER
Sharon Garin*	AAMBIS-Owa
Catalina Leonen-Pizarro	ABS
Kaka Bag-ao*	Akbayan
Catalina Bagasina*	ALE
Cinchona Gonzales	CIBAC
Emmeline Aglipay-Villar*	DIWA
Luzviminda Ilagan	Gabriela
Emmi de Jesus*	Gabriela
Abigail Faye Ferriol*	KALINGA
Reena Concepcion Obillo*	1 ANG PAMILYA
Carol Jane Lopez	YACAP

=== 16th Congress (2013–2016) ===
==== District Representatives ====
Member	Party	Province/City (district)
Maria Jocelyn Bernos	Liberal	Abra (Lone)
Maria Valentina Plaza	NUP	Agusan del Sur (1st)
Evelyn Plaza-Mellana	NUP	Agusan del Sur (2nd)
Eleanor Bulut Begtang	NPC	Apayao (Lone)
Bella Angara	LDP	Aurora (Lone)
Herminia Roman	Liberal	Bataan (1st)
Henedina Abad	Liberal	Batanes (Lone)
Eileen Ermita-Buhain	Lakas	Batangas (1st)
Maria Lourdes Acosta-Alba*	Liberal	Bukidnon (1st)
Victoria Sy-Alvarado	NUP	Bulacan (1st)
Linabelle Villarica	Liberal	Bulacan (4th)
Sally Ponce Enrile	NPC	Cagayan (1st)
Baby Aline Vargas-Alfonso	NUP	Cagayan (2nd)
Cathy Barcelona-Reyes*	NUP	Camarines Norte (1st)
Leni Robredo*	Liberal	Camarines Sur (3rd)
Lani Mercado	Lakas	Cavite (2nd)
Gwendolyn Garcia*	UNA	Cebu (3rd)
Maria Carmen Zamora	Liberal	Compostela Valley (1st)
Nancy Catamco	Liberal	Cotabato (2nd)
Mylene Garcia-Albano	Liberal	Davao City (2nd)
Mercedes Cagas*	Nacionalista	Davao del Sur (1st)
Thelma Almario	Lakas	Davao Oriental (2nd)
Kaka Bag-ao	Liberal	Dinagat Islands (Lone)
Imelda Marcos	KBL	Ilocos Norte (2nd)
Ana Cristina Go	Nacionalista	Isabela (2nd)
Sol Aragones*	UNA	Laguna (3rd)
Imelda Dimaporo	NPC	Lanao del Norte (1st)
Aileen Radaza*	Lakas	Lapu-Lapu City (Lone)
Lucy Torres-Gomez	Liberal	Leyte (4th)
Bai Sandra Sema	Liberal	Maguindanao (1st)
Monique Lagdameo	UNA	Makati (1st)
Abigail Binay	UNA	Makati (2nd)
Zenaida Angping	NPC	Manila (3rd)
Trisha Bonoan-David	Liberal	Manila (4th)
Rosenda Ann Ocampo	Liberal	Manila (6th)
Regina Ongsiako-Reyes* (Note: Disqualified by the Commission on Elections and the Supreme Court due to her American citizenship and thus ineligible to hold office. Her opponent, Lord Allan Jay Velasco was officially recognized representative on February 1, 2016)	Liberal	Marinduque (Lone)
Maria Vida Espinosa-Bravo*	NUP	Masbate (1st)
Elisa Olga Kho*	Lakas	Masbate (2nd)
Juliette Uy*	NUP	Misamis Oriental (2nd)
Mercedes Alvarez	NPC	Negros Occidental (6th)
Estrellita Suansing*	Sigaw	Nueva Ecija (1st)
Czarina Umali	Liberal	Nueva Ecija (3rd)
Magnolia Antonino-Nadres*	NUP	Nueva Ecija (4th)
Josephine Sato	Liberal	Occidental Mindoro (Lone)
Gloria Macapagal-Arroyo	Lakas	Pampanga (2nd)
Rose Marie Arenas*	Liberal	Pangasinan (3rd)
Gina de Venecia	NPC	Pangasinan (4th)
Kimi Cojuangco	NPC	Pangasinan (5th)
Marlyn Primicias-Agabas	NPC	Pangasinan (6th)
Imelda Calixto-Rubiano	Liberal	Pasay (Lone)
Aleta Suarez	NPC	Quezon (3rd)
Angelina Tan*	NPC	Quezon (4th)
Milagrosa Tan	NPC	Samar (2nd)
Marie Anne Pernes*	Liberal	Siquijor (Lone)
Evelina Escudero*	NPC	Sorsogon (1st)
Maryam Arbison*	Liberal	Sulu (2nd)
Mary Elizabeth Ty-Delgado* (Note: Assumed office on May 23, 2016 after her rival, Philip Pichay, was disqualified by the Supreme Court due to his libel conviction.)	Liberal	Surigao del Sur (1st)
Susan Yap	NPC	Tarlac (2nd)
Ruby Sahali*	Liberal	Tawi-Tawi (Lone)
Cheryl Deloso-Montalla*	Liberal	Zambales (2nd)
Lilia Macrohon-Nuño*	Nacionalista	Zamboanga City (2nd)
Aurora Cerilles	NUP	Zamboanga del Sur (2nd)
Belma Cabilao	Nacionalista	Zamboanga Sibugay (1st)
Dulce Ann Hofer	Liberal	Zamboanga del Sur (2nd)

==== Party-list Representatives ====
Member	Party-list
Julieta Cortuna	A TEACHER
Angelina Katoh*	Akbayan
Victoria Isabela Noel*	An Waray
Sitti Djalia Turabin*	Anak Mindanao
Sharon Garin	AAMBIS-Owa
Lorna Velasco*	AMA
Leah Paquiz*	Ang Nars
Catalina Leonen-Pizarro	ABS
Cinchona Gonzales	CIBAC
Emmeline Aglipay-Villar	DIWA
Luzviminda Ilagan	Gabriela
Emmi de Jesus	Gabriela
Abigail Faye Ferriol	KALINGA
Erlinda Santiago*	1-SAGIP
Carol Jane Lopez	YACAP

=== 17th Congress (2016–2019) ===
==== District Representatives ====
Member	Party	Province/City (district)
Maria Valentina Plaza	PDP–Laban	Agusan del Sur (1st)
Evelyn Plaza-Mellana	PDP–Laban	Agusan del Sur (2nd)
Cristina Roa-Puno*	NUP	Antipolo (1st)
Eleanor Bulut Begtang	PDP–Laban	Apayao (Lone)
Bella Angara	LDP	Aurora (Lone)
Jum Jainudin Akbar* (Note: Died on November 11, 2016)	Liberal	Basilan (Lone)
Geraldine Roman* (Note: First trans woman member of Congress)	PDP–Laban	Bataan (1st)
Henedina Abad (Note: Died on October 8, 2017.)	Liberal	Batanes (Lone)
Eileen Ermita-Buhain	Nacionalista	Batangas (1st)
Maria Theresa Collantes*	PDP–Laban	Batangas (3rd)
Lianda Bolilla*	Nacionalista	Batangas (4th)
Vilma Santos-Recto*	Nacionalista	Batangas (6th)
Marlyn Alonte-Naguiat*	PDP–Laban	Biñan (Lone)
Maria Lourdes Acosta-Alba	BPP	Bukidnon (1st)
Lorna Silverio	NUP	Bulacan (3rd)
Linabelle Villarica	PDP–Laban	Bulacan (4th)
Baby Aline Vargas-Alfonso	NUP	Cagayan (2nd)
Marisol Panotes*	PDP–Laban	Camarines Norte (2nd)
Jennifer Barzaga*	NUP	Cavite (4th)
Gwendolyn Garcia	PDP–Laban	Cebu (3rd)
Maria Carmen Zamora	Hugpong	Compostela Valley (1st)
Nancy Catamco	PDP–Laban	Cotabato (2nd)
Mylene Garcia-Albano	PDP–Laban	Davao City (2nd)
Mercedes Cagas	Nacionalista	Davao del Sur (Lone)
Lorna Bautista-Bandigan*	NPC	Davao Occidental (Lone)
Corazon Nuñez Malanyaon	Lakas	Davao Oriental (1st)
Kaka Bag-ao	Liberal	Dinagat Islands (Lone)
Maria Lucille Nava*	PDP–Laban	Guimaras (Lone)
Imelda Marcos	Nacionalista	Ilocos Norte (2nd)
Ana Cristina Go	Nacionalista	Isabela (2nd)
Maria Lourdes Aggabao*	NPC	Isabela (4th)
Sandra Eriguel*	PDP–Laban	La Union (2nd)
Arlene Arcillas*	PDP–Laban	Laguna (1st)
Sol Aragones	Nacionalista	Laguna (3rd)
Aileen Radaza	PDP–Laban	Lapu-Lapu City (Lone)
Yedda Marie Romualdez*	Lakas	Leyte (1st)
Lucy Torres-Gomez	PDP–Laban	Leyte (4th)
Bai Sandra Sema	PDP–Laban	Maguindanao (1st)
Alexandria Gonzales*	PDP–Laban	Mandaluyong (Lone)
Cristal Bagatsing*	KABAKA	Manila (5th)
Rosenda Ann Ocampo	PDP–Laban	Manila (6th)
Maria Vida Espinosa-Bravo	NUP	Masbate (1st)
Elisa Olga Kho	PDP–Laban	Masbate (2nd)
Juliette Uy	NUP	Misamis Oriental (2nd)
Juliet Marie Ferrer*	NUP	Negros Occidental (4th)
Mercedes Alvarez	NPC	Negros Occidental (6th)
Jocelyn Sy-Limkaichong	Liberal	Negros Oriental (1st)
Estrellita Suansing	PDP–Laban	Nueva Ecija (1st)
Micaela Violago*	NUP	Nueva Ecija (2nd)
Rosanna Vergara*	LDP	Nueva Ecija (3rd)
Magnolia Antonino-Nadres	NUP	Nueva Ecija (4th)
Luisa Lloren Cuaresma*	NUP	Nueva Vizcaya (Lone)
Josephine Sato	Liberal	Occidental Mindoro (Lone)
Gloria Macapagal-Arroyo	PDP–Laban	Pampanga (2nd)
Rose Marie Arenas	PDP–Laban	Pangasinan (3rd)
Marlyn Primicias-Agabas	NPC	Pangasinan (6th)
Imelda Calixto-Rubiano	PDP–Laban	Pasay (Lone)
Trina Enverga*	NPC	Quezon (1st)
Angelina Tan	NPC	Quezon (4th)
Milagrosa Tan	PDP–Laban	Samar (2nd)
Florida Robes*	PDP–Laban	San Jose del Monte (Lone)
Evelina Escudero	NPC	Sorsogon (1st)
Pia Cayetano*	Nacionalista	Taguig (2nd)
Ruby Sahali	PDP–Laban	Tawi-Tawi (Lone)
Cheryl Deloso-Montalla	Liberal	Zambales (2nd)
Glona Labadlabad*	PDP–Laban	Zamboanga del Norte (2nd)
Divina Grace Yu*	PDP–Laban	Zamboanga del Sur (1st)
Aurora Cerilles	Nacionalista	Zamboanga del Sur (2nd)
Dulce Ann Hofer	PDP–Laban	Zamboanga del Sur (2nd)

==== Party-list Representatives ====
Member	Party-list
Vini Nola Ortega*	Abono
France Castro*	ACT Teachers
Julieta Cortuna	A TEACHER
Michelle Antonio*	AGBIAG!
Delphine Lee*	AGRI
Victoria Isabela Noel	An Waray
Amihilda Sangcopan*	Anak Mindanao
Sitti Djalia Turabin (Note: Resigned on October 2, 2017)	Anak Mindanao
Sharon Garin	AAMBIS-Owa
Tricia Nicole Velasco-Catera*	MATA
Bernadette Herrera-Dy*	Bagong Henerasyon
Cecilia Leonila Chavez*	Butil
Milagros Aquino-Magsaysay*	Senior Citizens
Emmeline Aglipay-Villar (Note: Resigned on July 11, 2018, after being appointed as Justice undersecretary)	DIWA
Emmi de Jesus	Gabriela
Arlene Brosas*	Gabriela
Sarah Elago*	Kabataan
Abigail Faye Ferriol-Pascual	KALINGA
Shernee Tan*	Kusug Tausug

=== 18th Congress (2019–2022) ===
==== District Representatives ====
Member	Party	Province/City (district)
Angelica Amante	PDP–Laban	Agusan del Norte (2nd)
Resurreccion Acop* (Note: Died on May 28, 2021.)	NUP	Antipolo (2nd)
Loren Legarda*	NPC	Antique (Lone)
Geraldine Roman	Lakas	Bataan (1st)
Eileen Ermita-Buhain	Nacionalista	Batangas (1st)
Maria Theresa Collantes	NPC	Batangas (3rd)
Lianda Bolilla	Nacionalista	Batangas (4th)
Vilma Santos-Recto	Nacionalista	Batangas (6th)
Marlyn Alonte-Naguiat	PDP–Laban	Biñan (Lone)
Kristine Alexie Besas-Tutor*	Nacionalista	Bohol (3rd)
Maria Lourdes Acosta-Alba	BPP	Bukidnon (1st)
Lorna Silverio	NUP	Bulacan (3rd)
Samantha Louise Vargas-Alfonso*	NUP	Cagayan (2nd)
Josefina Tallado*	PDP–Laban	Camarines Norte (1st)
Marisol Panotes (Note: Died on April 29, 2022)	PDP–Laban	Camarines Norte (2nd)
Marissa Andaya* (Note: Died on July 5, 2020.)	NPC	Camarines Sur (1st)
Jocelyn Fortuno*	Nacionalista	Camarines Sur (5th)
Dahlia Loyola*	NPC	Cavite (5th)
Janice Salimbangon*	NUP	Cebu (4th)
Emmarie Ouano-Dizon*	PDP–Laban	Cebu (6th)
Mercedes Cagas	Nacionalista	Davao del Sur (Lone)
Lorna Bautista-Bandigan	Lakas	Davao Occidental (Lone)
Corazon Nuñez Malanyaon	Nacionalista	Davao Oriental (1st)
Maria Fe Abunda*	PDP–Laban	Eastern Samar (Lone)
Maria Lucille Nava	PDP–Laban	Guimaras (Lone)
Ria Christina Fariñas*	PDP–Laban	Ilocos Norte (1st)
Kristine Singson-Meehan*	NPC	Ilocos Sur (2nd)
Janette Garin	NUP	Iloilo (1st)
Julienne Baronda*	NUP	Iloilo City (Lone)
Alyssa Sheena Tan-Dy*	PDP–Laban	Isabela (4th)
Sandra Eriguel	Lakas	La Union (2nd)
Ruth Mariano-Hernandez*	PDP–Laban	Laguna (2nd)
Sol Aragones	Nacionalista	Laguna (3rd)
Paz Radaza*	Lakas	Lapu-Lapu City (Lone)
Camille Villar*	Nacionalista	Las Piñas (Lone)
Lolita Javier*	Nacionalista	Leyte (2nd)
Lucy Torres-Gomez	PDP–Laban	Leyte (4th)
Josephine Lacson-Noel	NPC	Malabon (Lone)
Cristal Bagatsing	NUP	Manila (5th)
Stella Quimbo*	Liberal	Marikina (2nd)
Elisa Olga Kho	PDP–Laban	Masbate (2nd)
Juliette Uy	NUP	Misamis Oriental (2nd)
Juliet Marie Ferrer	NUP	Negros Occidental (4th)
Maria Lourdes Arroyo	Lakas	Negros Occidental (5th)
Jocelyn Sy-Limkaichong	Liberal	Negros Oriental (1st)
Estrellita Suansing	PDP–Laban	Nueva Ecija (1st)
Micaela Violago	NUP	Nueva Ecija (2nd)
Rosanna Vergara	PDP–Laban	Nueva Ecija (3rd)
Maricel Natividad-Nagaño*	Sigaw	Nueva Ecija (4th)
Luisa Lloren Cuaresma	Lakas	Nueva Vizcaya (Lone)
Josephine Sato	Liberal	Occidental Mindoro (Lone)
Cyrille Abueg-Zaldivar*	Liberal	Palawan (2nd)
Rose Marie Arenas	PDP–Laban	Pangasinan (3rd)
Joy Myra Tambunting*	NUP	Parañaque (2nd)
Aleta Suarez	Lakas	Quezon (3rd)
Angelina Tan	NPC	Quezon (4th)
Precious Hipolito-Castelo*	Lakas	Quezon City (2nd)
Sharee Ann Tan	Nacionalista	Samar (2nd)
Florida Robes*	PDP–Laban	San Jose del Monte (Lone)
Evelina Escudero	NPC	Sorsogon (1st)
Bernardita Ramos* (Note: Died on September 8, 2020.)	NPC	Sorsogon (2nd)
Shirlyn Bañas-Nograles* (Note: Took office on November 4, 2019)	PDP–Laban	South Cotabato (1st)
Rihan Sakaluran*	Lakas	Sultan Kudarat (1st)
Lani Cayetano	Nacionalista	Taguig (2nd)
Cheryl Deloso-Montalla	NPC	Zambales (2nd)
Glona Labadlabad	PDP–Laban	Zamboanga del Norte (2nd)
Divina Grace Yu	PDP–Laban	Zamboanga del Sur (1st)
Dulce Ann Hofer	PDP–Laban	Zamboanga del Sur (2nd)

==== Party-list Representatives ====
Member	Party-list
Jocelyn Tulfo*	ACT-CIS
Rowena Niña Taduran*	ACT-CIS
Eufemia Cullamat*	Bayan Muna
Arlene Brosas	Gabriela
France Castro	ACT Teachers
Yedda Marie Romualdez	Tingog Sinirangan
Ducielle Cardema* (Note: Took office on October 13, 2020.)	Duterte Youth
Irene Gay Saulog*	KALINGA
Anna Marie Villaraza-Suarez*	ALONA
Bernadette Herrera-Dy	Bagong Henerasyon
Naealla Bainto Aguinaldo*	Bahay
Maria Victoria Umali*	A TEACHER
Angelica Natasha Co*	BHW
Aloysia Lim*	RAM
Sharon Garin	AAMBIS-Owa
Shernee Tan	Kusug Tausug
Claudine Bautista*	DUMPER-PTDA
Sarah Elago	Kabataan
Amihilda Sangcopan	Anak Mindanao

=== 19th Congress (2022–2025) ===
==== District Representatives ====
Member	Party	Province/City (district)
Menchie Bernos*	Nacionalista	Abra (Lone)
Eleanor Bulut Begtang	NPC	Apayao (Lone)
Geraldine Roman	Lakas	Bataan (1st)
Maria Angela Garcia*	NUP	Bataan (3rd)
Gerville Luistro*	Lakas	Batangas (2nd)
Maria Theresa Collantes	NPC	Batangas (3rd)
Lianda Bolilla	Nacionalista	Batangas (4th)
Marlyn Alonte-Naguiat	Lakas	Biñan (Lone)
Maria Vanessa Aumentado*	Lakas	Bohol (2nd)
Kristine Alexie Besas-Tutor	Nacionalista	Bohol (3rd)
Laarni Roque*	Nacionalista	Bukidnon (4th)
Augustina Dominique Pancho*	NUP	Bulacan (2nd)
Lorna Silverio	NUP	Bulacan (3rd)
Linabelle Villarica	PDP–Laban	Bulacan (4th)
Baby Aline Vargas-Alfonso	Lakas	Cagayan (2nd)
Charisse Anne Hernandez*	Lakas	Calamba (Lone)
Mitzi Cajayon	PDP–Laban	Caloocan (2nd)
Josefina Tallado	Lakas	Camarines Norte (1st)
Rosemarie Panotes*	PDP–Laban	Camarines Norte (2nd)
Jane Castro	Lakas	Capiz (2nd)
Lani Mercado	Lakas	Cavite (2nd)
Aniela Tolentino*	NUP	Cavite (8th)
Rhea Mae Gullas*	Nacionalista	Cebu (1st)
Janice Salimbangon	NUP	Cebu (4th)
Daphne Lagon*	Lakas	Cebu (6th)
Rachel del Mar	NPC	Cebu City (1st)
Maria Alana Samantha Santos*	Lakas	Cotabato (3rd)
Maria Carmen Zamora	Lakas	Davao de Oro (1st)
Maria Fe Abunda	Lakas	Eastern Samar (Lone)
Lucille Nava	PDP–Laban	Guimaras (Lone)
Kristine Singson-Meehan	NPC	Ilocos Sur (2nd)
Janette Garin	NUP	Iloilo (1st)
Julienne Baronda	NUP	Iloilo City (Lone)
Ann Matibag*	PDP–Laban	Laguna (1st)
Ruth Mariano-Hernandez	Lakas	Laguna (2nd)
Jam Agarao*	Lakas	Laguna (4th)
Aminah Dimaporo*	Lakas	Lanao del Norte (2nd)
Cynthia Chan*	PDP–Laban	Lapu-Lapu City (Lone)
Camille Villar	Nacionalista	Las Piñas (Lone)
Lolita Javier	Nacionalista	Leyte (2nd)
Anna Veloso-Tuazon*	NUP	Leyte (3rd)
Josephine Lacson-Noel	NPC	Malabon (Lone)
Emmarie Ouano-Dizon	Lakas	Mandaue (Lone)
Marjorie Ann Teodoro*	UNA	Marikina (1st)
Stella Quimbo	Liberal	Marikina (2nd)
Ara Kho*	PDP–Laban	Masbate (2nd)
Juliet Marie Ferrer	NUP	Negros Occidental (4th)
Mercedes Alvarez	NPC	Negros Occidental (6th)
Jocelyn Sy-Limkaichong	Liberal	Negros Oriental (1st)
Mika Suansing*	Nacionalista	Nueva Ecija (1st)
Rosanna Vergara	PDP–Laban	Nueva Ecija (3rd)
Luisa Lloren Cuaresma	Lakas	Nueva Vizcaya (Lone)
Gloria Macapagal-Arroyo	Lakas	Pampanga (2nd)
Anna York Bondoc	Nacionalista	Pampanga (4th)
Maria Rachel Arenas	Lakas	Pangasinan (3rd)
Marlyn Primicias-Agabas	PDP–Laban	Pangasinan (6th)
Marivic Co-Pilar*	NUP	Quezon City (6th)
Midy Cua*	Lakas	Quirino (Lone)
Florida Robes	PDP–Laban	San Jose del Monte (Lone)
Bel Zamora*	PDP–Laban	San Juan, Metro Manila (Lone)
Marie Bernadette Escudero*	NPC	Sorsogon (1st)
Luz Mercado*	NUP	Southern Leyte (1st)
Rihan Sakaluran	Lakas	Sultan Kudarat (1st)
Pammy Zamora*	Nacionalista	Taguig (2nd)
Doris Maniquiz*	Lakas	Zambales (2nd)
Glona Labadlabad	PDP–Laban	Zamboanga del Norte (2nd)
Divina Grace Yu	PDP–Laban	Zamboanga del Sur (1st)
Victoria Yu*	PDP–Laban	Zamboanga del Sur (2nd)
Antonieta Eudela*	Lakas	Zamboanga Sibugay (2nd)

==== Party-list Representatives ====
Member	Party-list
France Castro	ACT Teachers
Rachelle Singson-Michael*	Ako Ilocano Ako
Anna Marie Villaraza-Suarez	ALONA
Jocelyn Tulfo	ACT-CIS
Bernadette Herrera-Dy	Bagong Henerasyon
Angelica Natasha Co	BHW
Claudine Bautista	DUMPER-PTDA
Drixie Mae Suarez*	Duterte Youth
Arlene Brosas	Gabriela
Irene Gay Saulog	KALINGA
Rowena Guanzon* (Note: Prevented from assuming seat through a temporary restraining order issued by the Supreme Court on June 29, 2022. Her nomination was nullified by the Supreme Court on August 20, 2024, effectively prohibiting her from taking office.)	P3PWD
Shernee Tan	Kusug Tausug
Marissa Magsino*	OFW
Margarita Ignacia Nograles*	PBA
Caroline Tanchay*	SAGIP
Yedda Marie Romualdez	Tingog Sinirangan
Milagros Aquino-Magsaysay	United Senior Citizens

=== 20th Congress (2025–2028) ===
==== District Representatives ====
Member	Party	Province/City (district)
Krisel Lagman-Luistro	Liberal	Albay (1st)
Eleanor Bulut Begtang	NPC	Apayao (Lone)
Maria Angela Garcia	NUP	Bataan (3rd)
Gerville Luistro	Lakas	Batangas (2nd)
Beverley Dimacuha*	Nacionalista	Batangas (4th)
Maria Vanessa Aumentado	Lakas	Bohol (2nd)
Kristine Alexie Besas-Tutor	Lakas	Bohol (3rd)
Audrey Zubiri*	PFP	Bukidnon (3rd)
Laarni Roque	Nacionalista	Bukidnon (4th)
Augustina Dominique Pancho	NUP	Bulacan (2nd)
Linabelle Villarica	PFP	Bulacan (4th)
Agatha Cruz*	Lakas	Bulacan (5th)
Baby Aline Vargas-Alfonso	Lakas	Cagayan (2nd)
Charisse Anne Hernandez	Lakas	Calamba (Lone)
Josefina Tallado	Lakas	Camarines Norte (1st)
Rosemarie Panotes	Lakas	Camarines Norte (2nd)
Jane Castro	Lakas	Capiz (2nd)
Lani Mercado	Lakas	Cavite (2nd)
Jenny Barzaga	Lakas	Cavite (4th)* (Note: Elected in a special election on August 29, 2026.)
Aniela Tolentino	NUP	Cavite (8th)
Rhea Gullas	Lakas	Cebu (1st)
Karen Garcia*	NUP	Cebu (3rd)
Daphne Lagon*	Lakas	Cebu (6th)
Patricia Calderon*	NPC	Cebu (7th)
Rachel del Mar	NPC	Cebu City (1st)
Maria Alana Samantha Santos*	Lakas	Cotabato (3rd)
Maria Carmen Zamora	Lakas	Davao de Oro (1st)
Kaka Bag-ao	Liberal	Dinagat Islands (Lone)
Shirlyn Bañas-Nograles	PDP–Laban	General Santos (Lone)
Kristine Singson-Meehan	NPC	Ilocos Sur (2nd)
Janette Garin	Lakas	Iloilo (1st)
Kathryn Joyce Gorriceta	Lakas	Iloilo (2nd)
Binky April Tupas	Lakas	Iloilo (5th)
Julienne Baronda	Lakas	Iloilo City (Lone)
Caroline Agyao*	PFP	Kalinga (Lone)
Ann Matibag	Lakas	Laguna (1st)
Imelda Dimaporo	PFP	Lanao del Norte (1st)
Aminah Dimaporo	Lakas	Lanao del Norte (2nd)
Lolita Javier	Nacionalista	Leyte (2nd)
Anna Veloso-Tuazon	NUP	Leyte (3rd)
Dimple Mastura*	Lakas	Maguindanao del Norte (Lone)
Monique Lagdameo	MKTZNU	Makati (1st)
Alexandria Gonzales	NUP	Mandaluyong (Lone)
Emmarie Ouano-Dizon	Lakas	Mandaue (Lone)
Giselle Maceda*	Asenso	Manila (4th)
Ara Kho	Lakas	Masbate (2nd)
Karen Lagbas*	NUP	Misamis Oriental (1st)
Mercedes Alvarez	NPC	Negros Occidental (6th)
Maria Isabel Sagarbarria*	Lakas	Negros Oriental (2nd)
Janice Degamo*	Lakas	Negros Oriental (3rd)
Mika Suansing	Lakas	Nueva Ecija (1st)
Rosalie Salvame*	PRP	Palawan (1st)
Gloria Macapagal-Arroyo	Lakas	Pampanga (2nd)
Mica Gonzales*	Lakas	Pampanga (3rd)
Anna York Bondoc	Nacionalista	Pampanga (4th)
Maria Rachel Arenas	Lakas	Pangasinan (3rd)
Gina de Venecia	Lakas	Pangasinan (4th)
Marlyn Primicias-Agabas	PDP–Laban	Pangasinan (6th)
Marivic Co-Pilar	NUP	Quezon City (6th)
Midy Cua	Lakas	Quirino (Lone)
Mia Ynares	NPC	Rizal (1st)
Bel Zamora	Lakas	San Juan, Metro Manila (Lone)
Marie Bernadette Escudero	NPC	Sorsogon (1st)
Ruth Sakaluran*	Lakas	Sultan Kudarat (1st)
Bella Suansing*	PFP	Sultan Kudarat (2nd)
Bernadette Barbers*	PFP	Surigao del Norte (2nd)
Cristy Angeles*	PFP	Tarlac (2nd)
Doris Maniquiz	Lakas	Zambales (2nd)
Katrina Reiko Chua-Tai*	Independent	Zamboanga City (2nd)
Irene Labadlabad*	Lakas	Zamboanga del Norte (2nd)
Victoria Yu	Lakas	Zamboanga del Sur (2nd)
Marly Hofer-Hasim*	PFP	Zamboanga Sibugay (2nd)

==== Party-list Representatives ====
Member	Party-list
Iris Marie Montes*	4K
Rachelle Singson-Michael	Ako Ilocano Ako
Jocelyn Tulfo	ACT-CIS
Dadah Kiram Ismula*	Akbayan
Maria Cristina Lopez*	ALONA
Claudine Bautista	DUMPER-PTDA
Sarah Elago	Gabriela
Renee Co*	Kabataan
Caroline Tanchay	Kamalayan
Girlie Veloso*	Malasakit at Bayanihan
Leila de Lima*	Mamamayang Liberal
Maria Nina Francesca Lacson*	Manila Teachers
Florabel Yatco*	Nanay
Maria Kristina Jihan Glepa*	ONE COOP
Menchie Bernos	Solid North
Arlyn Ayon	SWERTE
Marie Josephine Diana Calatrava*	Tingog
Yedda Romualdez	Tingog
Johanne Monich Bautista*	Trabaho
Milagros Aquino-Magsaysay	United Senior Citizens

== Summary ==
This table starts on the 1938 Philippine legislative election, the first election where women were able to vote and run for office after the approval of the 1937 Philippine women's suffrage plebiscite.

Election	Elected	Legislative term
1938	0 / 98	2nd National Assembly of the Philippines
1941	1 / 98	1st Congress of the Commonwealth of the Philippines
1943	1 / 108	National Assembly of the Philippines
1946	1 / 98	2nd Congress of the Commonwealth of the Philippines
1949	1 / 100	2nd Congress of the Philippines
1953	1 / 100	3rd Congress of the Philippines
1957	2 / 102	4th Congress of the Philippines
1961	3 / 104	5th Congress of the Philippines
1965	6 / 104	6th Congress of the Philippines
1969	3 / 110	7th Congress of the Philippines
1970	11 / 320	Philippine Constitutional Convention of 1971
1976	11 / 140	Batasang Bayan
1978	11 / 189	Interim Batasang Pambansa
1984	11 / 200	Regular Batasang Pambansa
n/a	7 / 48	Philippine Constitutional Commission of 1986
1987	19 / 214	8th Congress of the Philippines
1992	23 / 216	9th Congress of the Philippines
1995	22 / 226	10th Congress of the Philippines
1998	26 / 220	11th Congress of the Philippines
2001	39 / 221	12th Congress of the Philippines
2004	38 / 237	13th Congress of the Philippines
2007	53 / 270	14th Congress of the Philippines
2010	62 / 286	15th Congress of the Philippines
2013	79 / 293	16th Congress of the Philippines
2016	87 / 297	17th Congress of the Philippines
2019	85 / 304	18th Congress of the Philippines
2022	85 / 314	19th Congress of the Philippines
2025	91 / 317	20th Congress of the Philippines
