= Legislative districts of Butuan =

The lone legislative district of Butuan is the representation of the highly urbanized city of Butuan in the various national legislatures of the Philippines. The city is currently represented in the lower house of the Congress of the Philippines thru its congressional district.

== History ==
Prior to gaining separate representation, areas now under the jurisdiction of Butuan were represented under the historical Agusan (1907–1967), Agusan del Norte (At-Large: 1969–1986) and Agusan del Norte (1st District: 1987–2025).

== Butuan's Lone District ==
- Barangays: All 86 barangays will be divided into 13 subdistricts based on their location
- Population (2020): 372,910

#	Member	Term of office		Congress	Party	Electoral history	Constituent LGUs
#	Member	Start	End	Congress	Party	Electoral history	Constituent LGUs
1	To be elected	June 30, 2025	June 30, 2028	20th	TBD	Elected in 2025.	2025–2028; Butuan's all 86 barangays

== Representation history ==
=== Agusan at-large district (defunct) ===
#	Member	Term of office		Congress/Batasang Pambansa	Party	Electoral history	Constituent LGUs
#	Member	Start	End	Congress/Batasang Pambansa	Party	Electoral history	Constituent LGUs
1	Apolonio D. Curato	November 25, 1935	December 16, 1941	1st National Assembly	Nacionalista Democratico	Elected in 1935	
1	Apolonio D. Curato	November 25, 1935	December 16, 1941	2nd National Assembly	Nacionalista	Re-elected in 1938	
2	Elisa R. Ochoa	October 14, 1943	December 20, 1945	1st Commonwealth Congress	Nacionalista	Inducted in 1943	
3	Marcos M. Calo	May 25, 1946	December 8, 1953	1st Congress	Liberal	Elected in 1946	
3	Marcos M. Calo	May 25, 1946	December 8, 1953	2nd Congress	Liberal	Re-elected in 1951	Butuan City (charter) and Agusan Province (defunct)
4	Guillermo R. Sanchez	January 25, 1954	December 17, 1965	3rd Congress	Nacionalista	Elected in 1953	Butuan City (charter) and Agusan Province (defunct)
4	Guillermo R. Sanchez	January 25, 1954	December 17, 1965	4th Congress	Nacionalista	Re-elected in 1957	Butuan City (charter) and Agusan Province (defunct)
4	Guillermo R. Sanchez	January 25, 1954	December 17, 1965	5th Congress	Nacionalista	Re-elected in 1961	Butuan City (charter) and Agusan Province (defunct)
5	Jose C. Aquino	January 17, 1966	June 17, 1969	6th Congress	Nacionalista	Liberal	Butuan City (charter) and Agusan Province (defunct)

=== Agusan del Norte's at-large district ===
#	Member	Term of office		Congress/Batasang Pambansa	Party	Electoral history	Constituent LGUs
#	Member	Start	End	Congress/Batasang Pambansa	Party	Electoral history	Constituent LGUs
District created June 17, 1967, from Agusan's at-large district.
1	Guillermo R. Sanchez	December 30, 1969	September 23, 1972	7th	Nacionalista	Elected in 1969. Removed from office after imposition of martial law.	Butuan City and Agusan del Norte Province
District dissolved into the nine-seat Region X's at-large district for the Interim Batasang Pambansa.
District re-created February 1, 1984.
2	Edelmiro Amante	July 23, 1984	March 25, 1986	2nd	Nacionalista	Elected in 1984.	Butuan City and Agusan del Norte Province
District dissolved into Agusan del Norte's 1st and 2nd districts.

=== Agusan del Norte's 1st Legislative District ===
#	Member	Term of office		Congress	Party	Electoral history	Constituent LGUs
#	Member	Start	End	Congress	Party	Electoral history	Constituent LGUs
1	Charito B. Plaza	June 30, 1987	June 30, 1998	8th	LDP	Elected in 1987.	1987–2025; Butuan, Las Nieves
1	Charito B. Plaza	June 30, 1987	June 30, 1998	9th	Lakas	Re-elected in 1992.	1987–2025; Butuan, Las Nieves
1	Charito B. Plaza	June 30, 1987	June 30, 1998	10th	Liberal	Re-elected in 1995.	1987–2025; Butuan, Las Nieves
2	Leovigildo Banaag	June 30, 1998	June 30, 2007	11th	LAMMP	Elected in 1998.	1987–2025; Butuan, Las Nieves
2	Leovigildo Banaag	June 30, 1998	June 30, 2007	12th	LDP	Elected in 2001.	1987–2025; Butuan, Las Nieves
2	Leovigildo Banaag	June 30, 1998	June 30, 2007	13th	Lakas	Re-elected in 2004.	1987–2025; Butuan, Las Nieves
3	Jose Aquino II	June 30, 2007	June 30, 2013	14th	Lakas	Elected in 2007.	1987–2025; Butuan, Las Nieves
3	Jose Aquino II	June 30, 2007	June 30, 2013	15th	Lakas	Re-elected in 2010.	1987–2025; Butuan, Las Nieves
4	Lawrence Fortun	June 30, 2013	June 30, 2022	16th	Liberal	Elected in 2013.	1987–2025; Butuan, Las Nieves
4	Lawrence Fortun	June 30, 2013	June 30, 2022	17th	Nacionalista	Re-elected in 2016.	1987–2025; Butuan, Las Nieves
4	Lawrence Fortun	June 30, 2013	June 30, 2022	18th	Nacionalista	Re-elected in 2019.	1987–2025; Butuan, Las Nieves
(3)	Jose Aquino II	June 30, 2022	Incumbent	19th	Lakas	Elected in 2022.	1987–2025; Butuan, Las Nieves

== See also ==
- Legislative districts of Agusan
- Agusan del Norte (at-large)
- Agusan del Norte (1st district)
