= Agusan =

Agusan may refer to the following:

== In geography ==
- Agusan (province), a former province in the Philippines, now divided between:
  - Agusan del Norte
  - Agusan del Sur
- Legislative district of Agusan in the Philippines for the former province before it was divided into two separate ones
  - Agusan's at-large congressional district
- Agusan River, a river in Mindanao
  - The Agusan Marsh Wildlife Sanctuary

== Other ==
- A symbol in the Tironian notes shorthand system (⟨⁊⟩) when used as an abbreviation for agus ("and") in Irish and Scottish Gaelic
- Agusan language, a Manobo language of The Philippines
