= Butuan's at-large congressional district =

Legislative district of the Philippines

- Constituency for the House of Representatives of the Philippines
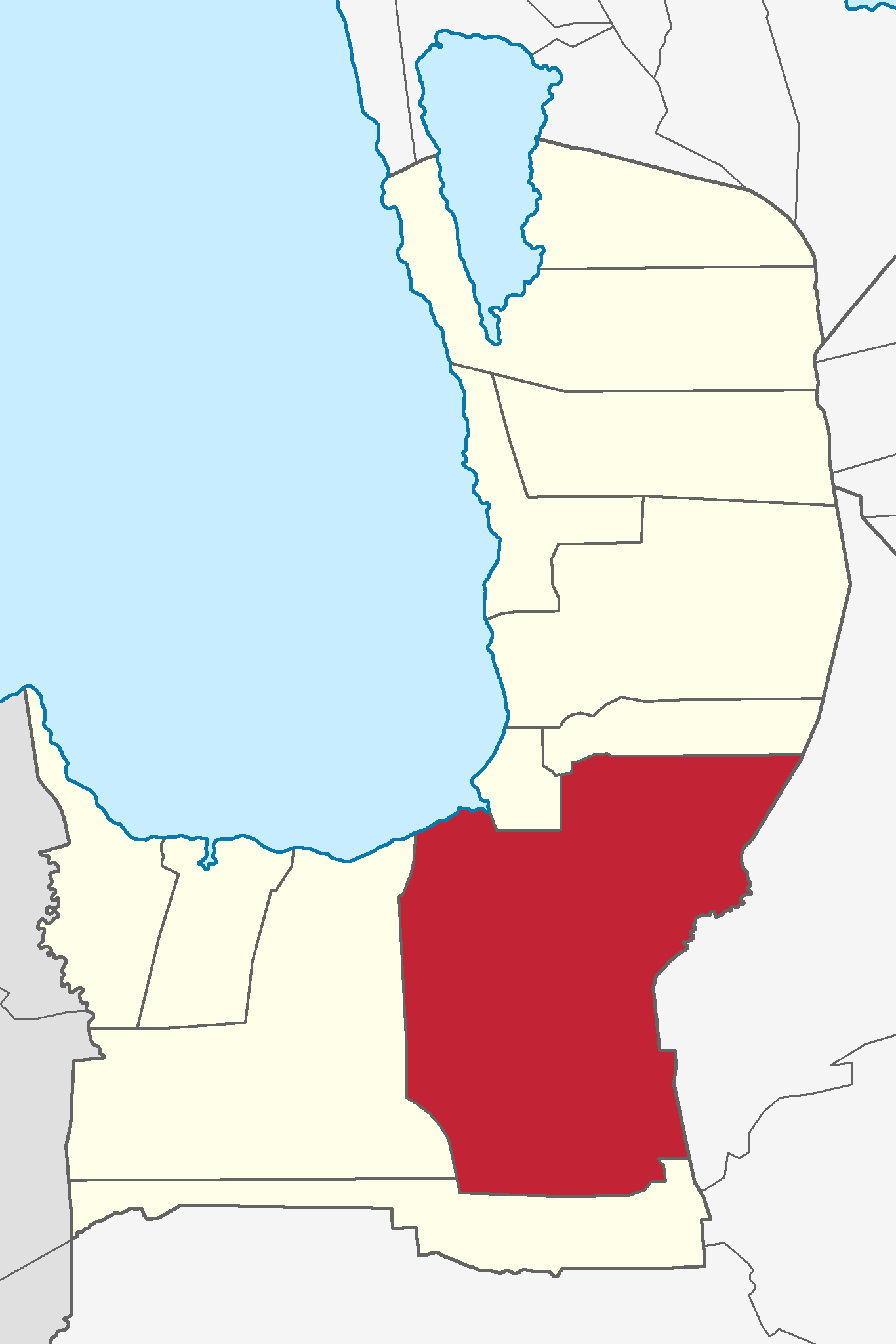
- Map of Butuan's at-large congressional district

- Location of Agusan del Norte within the Philippines
- Province: Agusan del Norte
- Region: Caraga
- Population: 372,910 (2020)
- Electorate: 220,694 (2025)
- Major settlements: 1 LGU: City; Butuan
- Area: 816.62 km^{2} (315.30 sq mi)

Current constituency
- Created: 2025
- Representative: Jose Aquino II
- Political party: Lakas–CMD
- Congressional bloc: Majority

Butuan's at-large congressional district is the sole congressional district in the highly urbanized city of Butuan. It has been represented in the House of Representatives of the Philippines since 2025. The district consists solely of the city of Butuan. It is currently represented in the 20th Congress by Jose Aquino II of the Lakas–CMD.

== History ==
Prior to gaining separate representation, areas now under the jurisdiction of Butuan were represented under the historical Agusan (at-large, 1907–1967), Agusan del Norte (at-large; 1969–1972, 1984–1986); Region X (1978–1984), and Agusan del Norte (1st district: 1987–2025).

Butuan, as a highly urbanized city, is not under the political and administrative jurisdiction of Agusan del Norte, and was only grouped with it for purposes of representation to the House of Representatives and its predecessors.

== Representation history ==
#	Member		Term of office		Congress	Party	Electoral history
#	Image	Name	Start	End	Congress	Party	Electoral history
District created April 27, 2022.
1		Jose Aquino II	June 30, 2025	Incumbent	20th	Lakas	Redistricted from Agusan del Norte's 1st district and re-elected in 2025.
