= Carol Jane Lopez =

Filipino politician

Member of the House of Representatives of the Philippines
- In office 2007–2016

Personal details
- Party: YACAP
- Occupation: Politician

Carol Jane B. Lopez is a Filipino politician who served as a party-list member of the House of Representatives of the Philippines.

== See also ==
- List of female members of the House of Representatives of the Philippines
- 14th Congress of the Philippines
- 15th Congress of the Philippines
- 16th Congress of the Philippines
