= Dimple Mastura =

Filipino politician

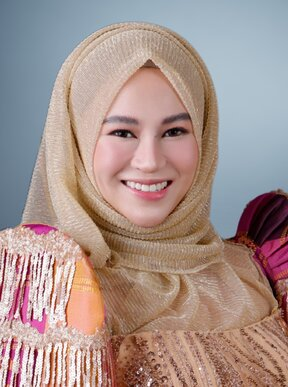
- Official portrait, 2026

Member of the Philippine House of Representatives from Maguindanao del Norte's at-large district
- Incumbent
- Assumed office September 18, 2022
- Preceded by: Constituency established

Member of the Philippine House of Representatives from Maguindanao del Norte's 1st district
- In office June 30, 2022 – September 18, 2022
- Preceded by: Roonie Sinsuat Sr.
- Succeeded by: Constituency abolished

Member of the Bangsamoro Parliament
- In office 2019–2022

Personal details
- Born: Sittie Shahara Ibrahim; November 27, 1990 (age 35) Cotabato City, Philippines
- Party: Lakas (2022–present)
- Other political affiliations: PDP–Laban (2021–2022)
- Spouse: Datu Shaheem Mastura

Sittie Shahara Ibrahim Mastura, known as Dimple Matsura, (born November 27, 1990) is a Filipino politician who currently serves in the House of Representatives of the Philippines for the at-large District of Maguindanao del Norte since 2022.

== Political career ==
Mastura served as a member of the interim Bangsamoro Parliament in the Bangsamoro Transition Authority from 2019 to 2022.

She was later elected as a representative of Maguindanao's 1st congressional district at the House of Representatives in the 2022 House of Representatives elections. Following the 2022 Maguindanao division plebiscite, she was redistricted to the lone district of the newly created province of Maguindanao del Norte. She was re-elected in 2025.

== See also ==
- List of female members of the House of Representatives of the Philippines
