= Maria Cristina Lopez =

Filipino politician (born 1979)

Member of the House of Representatives of the Philippines for ALONA
- Incumbent
- Assumed office June 30, 2025

Personal details
- Born: Maria Cristina Talavera; October 15, 1979
- Party: ALONA
- Occupation: Politician

Maria Cristina Talavera Lopez (born October 15, 1979) is a Filipino politician who has served as a party-list member of the House of Representatives of the Philippines since 2025.

== See also ==
- List of female members of the House of Representatives of the Philippines
- 20th Congress of the Philippines
