= Antonino Roman =

Filipino politician (1939–2014)

Antonino P. Roman, Jr.
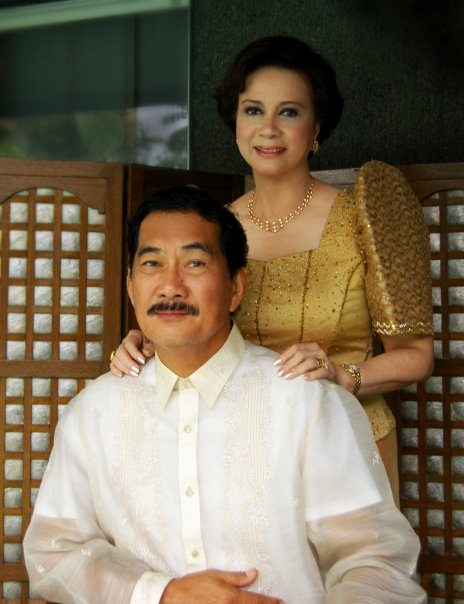
- Antonino Roman with his wife Herminia

Member of the Philippine House of Representatives from Bataan's 1st district
- In office June 30, 1998 – June 30, 2007
- Preceded by: Felicito Payumo
- Succeeded by: Herminia Roman

Mambabatas Pambansa (Assemblyman) from Bataan
- In office June 30, 1984 – March 25, 1986

Mambabatas Pambansa (Assemblyman) from Region III
- In office June 12, 1978 – June 5, 1984

Personal details
- Born: Antonino Pascual Roman; May 31, 1939 Orani, Bataan, Commonwealth of the Philippines
- Died: January 8, 2014 (aged 74) Makati, Metro Manila, Philippines
- Party: Liberal (2003–2014)
- Other political affiliations: Independent (2000–2003); LAMMP (1998–2000); KBL (1978–1986)
- Spouse: Herminia Roman
- Children: 4 (including Geraldine, Antonino III)
- Profession: Politician

Antonino Pascual Roman Jr. (May 31, 1939 – January 8, 2014) was a Filipino politician from Bataan. A member of the House of Representatives of the Philippines, he represented the 1st District of Bataan from 1998 until 2007, when his wife, Herminia Roman, took over the seat. Roman was an assemblyman from 1978 to 1986. He was also a Finance Deputy Minister under Finance Minister Cesar Virata, and Presidential Legislative Liaison Office (PLLO) Secretary from 2010 to 2012 under President Benigno Aquino III.

As a member of Congress, Roman served as the chairman of the House committee on veterans affairs and welfare, and the vice chairman of the special committee on bases conversion, as well as the committee on natural resources.

Roman died on January 8, 2014, of multiple organ failure. He was 74.

== See also ==
Personal Profile

House of Representatives of the Philippines
Preceded by Felicito Payumo	Representative, 1st District of Bataan; 1998–2007	Succeeded by Herminia Roman
