= Agusan del Norte's 1st congressional district =

House of Representatives of the Philippines legislative district

- Former constituency for the House of Representatives of the Philippines
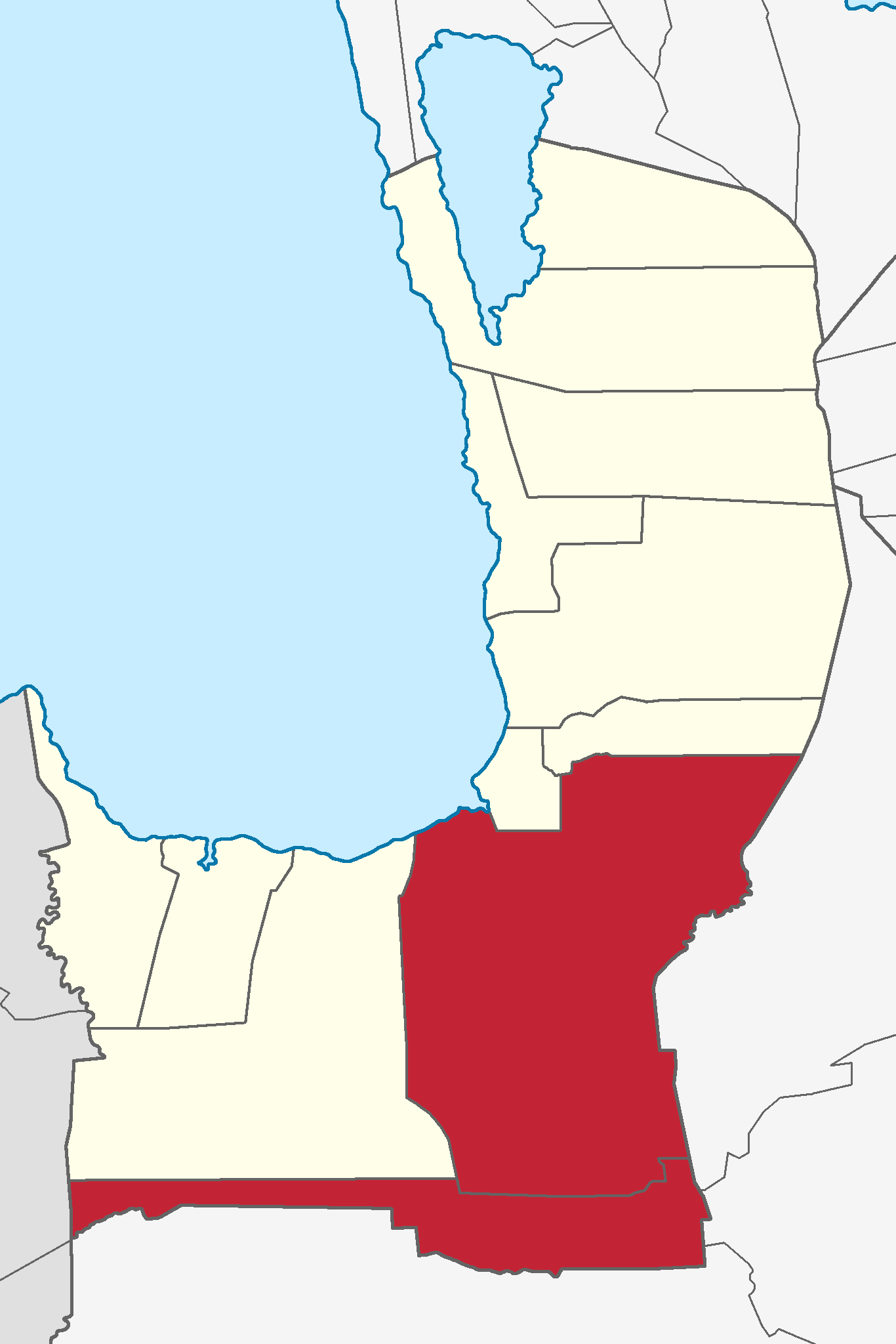
- Map of Agusan del Norte's 1st congressional district

- Location of Agusan del Norte within the Philippines
- Province: Agusan del Norte
- Region: Caraga
- Population: 403,150 (2020)
- Electorate: 246,909 (2022)
- Major settlements: 2 LGUs: Cities; Butuan; Municipalities; Las Nieves
- Area: 1,399.31 km^{2} (540.28 sq mi)

Former constituency
- Created: 1987
- Abolished: 2025

Agusan del Norte's 1st congressional district was one of the congressional districts for the House of Representatives of the Philippines in the province of Agusan del Norte. It was one of only two districts in the province in existence from 1987 to 2025. The district covered the independent city of Butuan and its neighbor, the municipality of Las Nieves. The district was dissolved in 2025 following the creation of Butuan's at-large congressional district, redistricting Las Nieves to the province's at-large district as well.

== List of members representing the district ==
=== House of Representatives (1987–present) ===
No.	Portrait	Member	Term of office		Legislature	Party	Electoral history	Constituent LGUs
No.	Portrait	Member	Start	End	Legislature	Party	Electoral history	Constituent LGUs
District created February 2, 1987. Redistricted from Agusan del Norte's at-large district.
1		Charito Plaza	June 30, 1987	June 30, 1998	8th Congress	UNIDO	Elected in 1987.	1987–2025; Butuan, Las Nieves
1		Charito Plaza	June 30, 1987	June 30, 1998	8th Congress	LDP	Elected in 1987.	1987–2025; Butuan, Las Nieves
1		Charito Plaza	June 30, 1987	June 30, 1998	9th Congress	LDP	Re-elected in 1992.	1987–2025; Butuan, Las Nieves
1		Charito Plaza	June 30, 1987	June 30, 1998	10th Congress	Lakas	Re-elected in 1995.	1987–2025; Butuan, Las Nieves
2		Leovigildo Banaag	June 30, 1998	June 30, 2007	11th Congress	LAMMP	Elected in 1998.	1987–2025; Butuan, Las Nieves
2		Leovigildo Banaag	June 30, 1998	June 30, 2007	12th Congress	LDP	Elected in 2001.	1987–2025; Butuan, Las Nieves
2		Leovigildo Banaag	June 30, 1998	June 30, 2007	13th Congress	Lakas	Re-elected in 2004.	1987–2025; Butuan, Las Nieves
3		Jose Aquino II	June 30, 2007	June 30, 2013	14th Congress	Lakas	Elected in 2007.	1987–2025; Butuan, Las Nieves
3		Jose Aquino II	June 30, 2007	June 30, 2013	15th Congress	Lakas	Re-elected in 2010.	1987–2025; Butuan, Las Nieves
4		Lawrence Fortun	June 30, 2013	June 30, 2022	16th Congress	Liberal	Elected in 2013.	1987–2025; Butuan, Las Nieves
4		Lawrence Fortun	June 30, 2013	June 30, 2022	17th Congress	Nacionalista	Re-elected in 2016.	1987–2025; Butuan, Las Nieves
4		Lawrence Fortun	June 30, 2013	June 30, 2022	18th Congress	Nacionalista	Re-elected in 2019.	1987–2025; Butuan, Las Nieves
(3)		Jose Aquino II	June 30, 2022	June 30, 2025	19th Congress	Lakas	Elected in 2022. Redistricted to Butuan's at-large district.	1987–2025; Butuan, Las Nieves

== Election results ==
=== 1992 ===
1992 Philippine House of Representatives election in Agusan del Norte
Party	Candidate	Votes	%
LDP	Charito Plaza (incumbent)	50,529	60.95
Lakas	Proceso Gonzales	29,373	35.43
LP–PDP	Wenceslao Ponferrada	2,250	2.71
Independent	Pedrito Famorcan	645	0.78
KBL	Crisotelo Montalban Jr.	102	0.12
Total votes		82,899	100.00
LDP hold			

=== 1995 ===
1995 Philippine House of Representatives election in Agusan del Norte
Party	Candidate	Votes	%
Lakas	Charito Plaza (incumbent)	48,268	54.55
LDP	Emmanuel Balanon	33,422	37.77
Independent	Carlito Tan	5,537	6.26
Independent	Jose Cuevas	1,259	1.42
Total votes		88,486	100.00
LDP hold			

=== 1998 ===
1998 Philippine House of Representatives election in Agusan del Norte
Party	Candidate	Votes	%
LAMMP	Leovigildo Banaag	37,312	40.42
Reporma	Emmanuel Balanon	25,283	27.39
Lakas	Dolfuss Go	21,359	23.14
Independent	Jaime Cembrano Jr.	8,169	8.85
Independent	James Biol	184	0.20
Total votes		92,307	100.00
LAMMP gain from Lakas			

=== 2010 ===
2010 Philippine House of Representatives election in Agusan del Norte
Party	Candidate	Votes	%
Lakas–Kampi	Jose Aquino II (incumbent)	88,656	68.50
Liberal	Angelo Jimenez	40,771	31.50
Valid ballots		129,427	92.31
Invalid or blank votes		10,779	7.69
Total votes		140,206	100.00
Lakas–Kampi hold			

=== 2022 ===
2022 Philippine House of Representatives election in Agusan del Norte
Party	Candidate	Votes	%
Lakas	Jose Aquino II	89,584	45.79
PRP	Kidz Libarios	81,929	41.88
PDP–Laban	Ronel Azarcon	24,138	12.34
Valid ballots		195,651	92.06
Invalid or blank votes		16,880	7.94
Total votes		212,531	100.00
Lakas hold			

== See also ==
- Legislative districts of Agusan del Norte
