= Shernee Tan-Tambut =

Filipino politician (born 1986)

- شِرْنِئِ تَنْ تَمْبُتْ
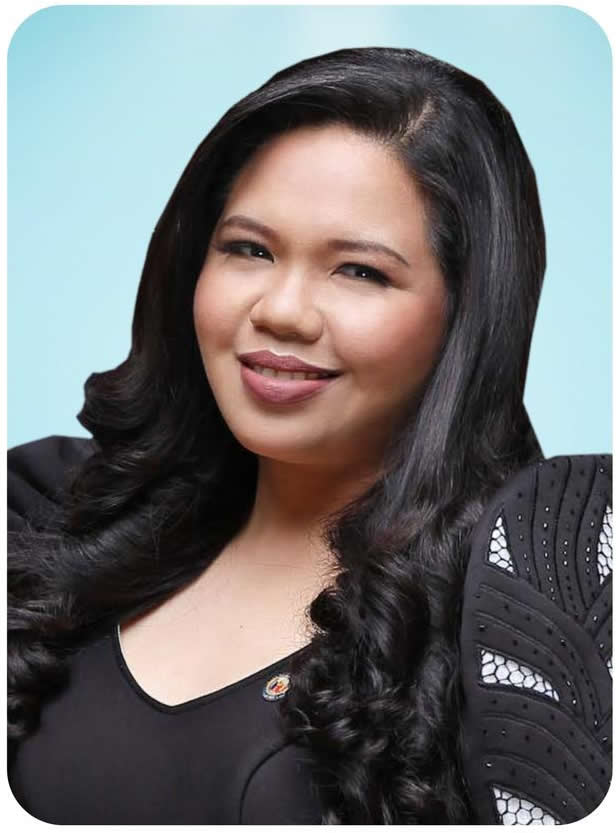
- Official portrait, 2022

Vice Mayor of Maimbung
- Incumbent
- Assumed office June 30, 2025
- Mayor: Shihla Tan-Hayudini
- Preceded by: Aiman Tan

Member of the Philippine House of Representatives for the Kusug Tausug
- In office June 30, 2016 – June 30, 2025
- Succeeded by: Aiman Tan

Personal details
- Born: Shernee Abubakar Tan; January 1, 1986 (age 40) Quezon City, Philippines
- Party: Lakas–CMD (2024–present)
- Other political affiliations: Kusug Tausug (partylist; 2015–2025)
- Spouse: Marjani Tambut (m. 2019)
- Parents: Abdusakur Mahail Tan (father); Nurunisah Abubakar (mother)
- Relatives: Abdusakur II (brother); Samier (brother)

Shernee Abubakar Tan-Tambut (born January 1, 1986) is a Filipino politician who currently serving as vice mayor of Maimbung since 2025. She served as representative of the House of Representatives of the Philippines under the Kusug Tausug partylist from 2016 to 2025.

== Political career ==
The Kusug Tausug partylist first won a seat at the 2016 elections. This seat by the organization advocating for the Tausūg people and other marginalized sectors was filled in by first nominee Shernee Tan-Tambut. She is known for questioning the alleged corruption behind the budget usage in the now defunct Autonomous Region in Muslim Mindanao (ARMM). She won two fresh mandates in the 2019 and 2022 elections.

Tan-Tambut has promoted the use of traditional Tausug cloth, pis syabit.

She proposed expanding the martial law imposed in Mindanao by President Rodrigo Duterte via Proclamation No. 216 in response to the 2017 Marawi siege nationwide. She believed that the presence of the New People's Army in Visayas and Mindanao could justify the expansion.

Tan-Tambut also opposed the provision of the Bangsamoro Organic Law which did not allow individual provinces in the ARMM to vote if they want to be included in the new Bangsamoro autonomous region. Her province of Sulu was included in the new region which replaced the ARMM in 2019 despite most Sulu residents voting against the 2019 plebiscite. The Supreme Court nullified Sulu's inclusion in September 2024.

She also proposed the designation of a permanent official residence for the vice president during the 19th Congress.

For the 2025 election, she ran for the position of vice mayor of Maimbung under the Lakas party. Outgoing vice mayor Aiman Tan was named Kusug's first nominee to replace Tan-Tambut.

== Personal life ==
Shernee Tan-Tambut was born on January 1, 1986, in Quezon City, Metro Manila. She is a Tausug Muslim of Chinese descent and hails from the town of Maimbung. Coming from an influential political family in Sulu, she is the youngest daughter of Abdusakur Mahail Tan and Nurunisah Abubakar. Shernee has four siblings.

She is married to Marjani "John" Tambut who is a pilot for Philippine Airlines. Former president Gloria Macapagal Arroyo, then-president Rodrigo Duterte, and other politicians were among the sponsor of their wedding, which took place in Zamboanga City in 2019.

== Electoral history ==
Electoral history of Shernee Tan-Tambut
Year	Office	Party	Votes received				Result
Year	Office	Party	Total	%	P.	Swing	Result
2016	Representative (Party-list)	Kusug Tausug	247,487	0.76%	44th	—N/a	Won
2019	Representative (Party-list)	Kusug Tausug	228,224	0.82%	41st	—N/a	Won
2022	Representative (Party-list)	Kusug Tausug	385,770	1.05%	26th	—N/a	Won
2025	Vice Mayor of Maimbung	Lakas	36,391	97.13%	1st	—N/a	Won
