= Julieta Cortuna =

Filipino politician

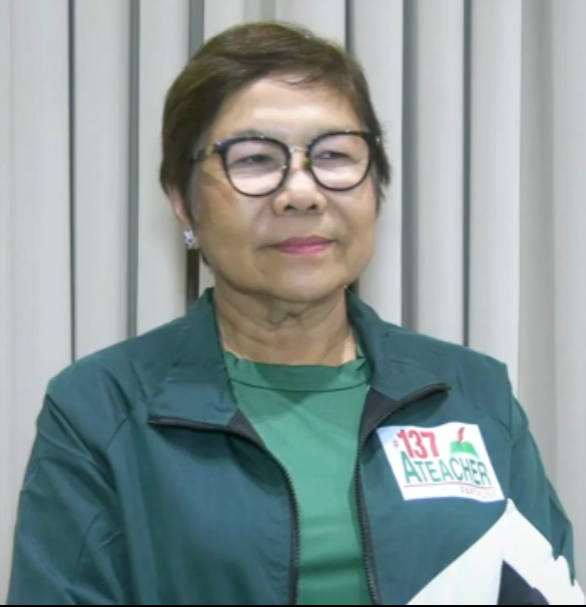
- In an interview in April 2025

Member of the House of Representatives of the Philippines for A Teacher Partylist
- In office 2010–2019

Personal details
- Born: July 28, 1953 (age 72) Occidental Mindoro, Philippines

Julieta Regudo Cortuna is a Filipino politician who was a member of the House of Representatives.

== See also ==
- 15th Congress of the Philippines
- 16th Congress of the Philippines
- 17th Congress of the Philippines
