= Jose Aquino II =

Filipino politician (born 1956)

Jose S. Aquino II
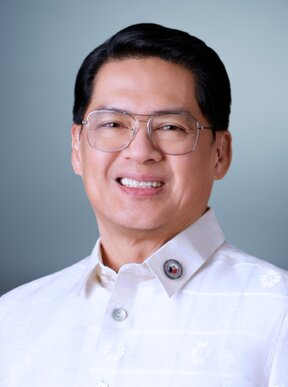
- Official portrait, 2025

Member of the Philippine House of Representatives from Butuan's at-large district
- Incumbent
- Assumed office June 30, 2025
- Preceded by: District created

Member of the Philippine House of Representatives from Agusan del Norte's 1st district
- In office June 30, 2022 – June 30, 2025
- Preceded by: Lawrence Fortun
- Succeeded by: District dissolved
- In office June 30, 2007 – June 30, 2013
- Preceded by: Leovigildo Banaag
- Succeeded by: Lawrence Fortun

Vice Mayor of Butuan
- In office June 30, 2016 – June 30, 2022
- Mayor: Ronnie Vicente Lagnada
- Preceded by: Angelo S. Calo
- Succeeded by: Lawrence Fortun

Member of the Butuan City Council
- In office June 30, 1995 – June 30, 2001

Personal details
- Born: March 18, 1956 (age 70) Butuan, Agusan, Philippines
- Party: Lakas (2007–2015; 2018–present)
- Other political affiliations: NUP (2015–2018)
- Education: San Beda University (BS)
- Occupation: Politician

Jose "Joboy" Sabijon Aquino II (born March 18, 1956) is a Filipino politician serving as the representative for Butuan's lone district since 2025. He previously served as the representative for Agusan del Norte's 1st district from 2007 to 2013 and 2022 to 2025. He also served as the vice mayor of Butuan from 2016 to 2022.

== Early political career (1994-2007) ==
He was a barangay councilor from 1994 to 1995 for Barangay Diego Silang, Butuan City. In the 1995 Philippine elections, he was elected as a councilor for Butuan. He was re-elected in 1998. Aquino then became the Deputy Presidential Assistant for Mindanao in the Office of the President of the Philippines until 2003. He then served as the Assistant Secretary for Mindanao of the Mindanao Economic Development Council until 2007.

== Representative and Vice Mayor (2007-2022) ==
Aquino was elected as a representative of Agusan del Norte's 1st congressional district in the 2007 Philippine House of Representatives elections. He helped establish the Caraga State University. He was re-elected for another term in the 2010 Philippine House of Representatives elections. In the 2016 Butuan local elections, he ran under the National Unity Party on the slate of Ronnie Lagnada. He won with 88,898 votes, beating the three other candidates. He ran in the 2019 elections under the slate of Lagnada with Lakas–CMD. He won again with 130,500, beating two other candidates.

== Representative (2022-present) ==
In 2022, Aquino ran for the seat of Agusan del Norte's 1st district under Lakas-CMD. He won against opposition Kidz Libarios of the People's Reform Party by a margin of 5,000 votes. He was selected as the Secretary-General for Lakas-CMD. He was elected as the chairperson for the Philippine House Committee on Public Information. He took part in a meeting with Representative Toby Tiangco regarding cybersecurity. He was part of the Philippine Delegation during multiple visits to the United States. He accompanied President Bongbong Marcos to one of his visits to Japan.

Aquino was one of the congress authors of Republic Act 11936, which appropriated funds of the Government of the Philippines in 2023. It was filed on September 6, 2022, and was read six days after. During the first impeachment of Sara Duterte, Aquino favored to impeach her. He ran in the 2025 elections under Lakas-CMD, for Butuan's at-large congressional district. He won unopposed gaining 107,974 votes, 48.92 percent of the votes.

House of Representatives of the Philippines
Preceded by Leovigildo Banaag	Member of the Philippine House of Representatives from Agusan del Norte's 1st District; 2007–2013	Succeeded by Lawrence Lemuel H. Fortun
Preceded by Lawrence Fortun	Member of the Philippine House of Representatives from Agusan del Norte's 1st District; 2022–2025	Succeeded by District dissolved
