= A Teacher Partylist =

Political organization in the Philippines

A Teacher
- — Philippine partylist —
- Full name: Advocacy for Teacher Empowerment Through Action, Cooperation and Harmony Towards Educational Reforms, Inc.
- Sector(s) represented: Education

Website
- ateacherpartylist.com

Advocacy for Teacher Empowerment Through Action, Cooperation and Harmony Towards Educational Reforms, Inc, also known as A Teacher Partylist, is a party-list in the Philippines. In the May 14, 2007 election, the party won one seat in the nationwide party-list vote (and has subsequently has seen been given another seat due to the litigation in the BANAT vs. COMELEC case).

== 2022 elections ==
A benefit e-concert was held on December 11 by the party-list for their campaign with singers Lani Misalucha and Ice Seguerra. According to a website, the party-list "aspires to be the voice of the education sector, representing teachers, students, non-teaching staff, and academic institutions." The party-list supported giving fresh graduates teaching experience. In the results the party-list gained 62nd place with 218,389 votes or 0.60 percent of the votes.

== 2025 elections ==
According to The Philippine Star, the party-list gained attention to voters around the country after conducting door-to-door campaigns. Nominee Virginia Rodriguez warned voters to carefully pick candidates. Rodriguez created food caravan and feeding programs in schools around the country. The party-list supported vouchers for the children. The party-list supports focusing on smaller schools for decongestion. The party-list gained 82nd place with 156,775 votes, 0.38 percent of the votes.

== Electoral performance ==
| Election | Votes | % | Seats |
|---|---|---|---|
| 2007 | 490,379 | 3.07% | 2 |
| 2010 | 617,898 | 2.07% | 2 |
| 2013 | 1,034,164 | 3.80% | 2 |
| 2016 | 475,488 | 1.47% | 1 |
| 2019 | 274,460 | 0.98% | 1 |
| 2022 | 221,327 | 0.60% | 0 |
| 2025 | 157,116 | 0.37% | 0 |

=== Representatives to Congress ===
| Period | 1st Representative | 2nd Representative |
|---|---|---|
| 14th Congress; 2007–2010 | Mariano Piamonte Jr. | Ulpiano Sarmiento III |
| 15th Congress; 2010–2013 | Mariano Piamonte Jr. | Julieta Cortuna |
| 16th Congress; 2013–2016 | Mariano Piamonte Jr. | Julieta Cortuna |
| 17th Congress; 2016–2019 | Julieta Cortuna | — |
| 18th Congress; 2019–2022 | Mariano Piamonte Jr. | — |
Note: A party-list group, can win a maximum of three seats in the House of Representatives.
