= Geraldine Roman =

Filipina politician

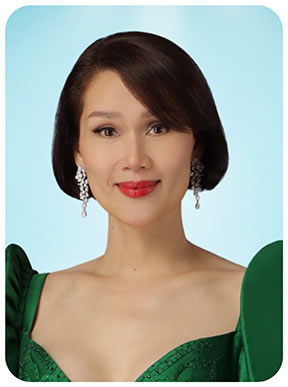
- Official portrait, 2022

Chair of the House Committee on Women and Gender Equality
- In office July 27, 2022 – June 29, 2025
- Preceded by: Ma. Lourdes Acosta Alba

Member of the Philippine House of Representatives from Bataan's 1st district
- In office June 30, 2016 – June 30, 2025
- Preceded by: Herminia Roman
- Succeeded by: Antonino Roman III

Personal details
- Born: April 23, 1967 (age 59)
- Party: Lakas (2020–present)
- Other political affiliations: PDP–Laban (2017–2020); Liberal (2015–2017)
- Education: University of the Philippines Diliman (BA); University of the Basque Country (MA)
- Profession: Journalist; Politician

Military service
- Allegiance: Philippines
- Branch/service: Armed Forces of the Philippines Reserve Command
- Rank: Lieutenant Colonel

Geraldine Batista Roman (born April 23, 1967) is a Filipina journalist and politician who served as the Representative of Bataan's 1st district from 2016 to 2025. She is the first transgender person elected to the Congress of the Philippines.

She was named as one of the 100 Leading Global Thinkers of 2016 by US-based Foreign Policy magazine, and one of the 13 Inspiring Women of 2016 by Time magazine. She has been a member of the now-dominant Lakas–CMD since 2020, having previously been a member of the Liberal Party from 2015 to 2017 and PDP–Laban from 2017 to 2020.

== Early life and education ==
Geraldine Roman was born on April 23, 1967 . She is the second of four children born into the family of politicians Herminia Roman and Antonino Roman, Jr. and was raised as a boy. She was teased by her classmates but her father taught her to be confident.

Roman attended the basic education unit of Ateneo de Manila University for her elementary and high school studies. For her collegiate studies, she attended the University of the Philippines Diliman. She managed to secure a scholarship to pursue journalism at the University of the Basque Country in Spain and attained two master's degrees. She worked in Spain as a senior editor for the Spanish News Agency before returning to the Philippines in 2012 to take care of her father, who was seriously ill by that time.

== Political career ==
=== Congress ===
During the 2016 Philippine elections, Roman ran under the Liberal Party banner for the position of 1st district representative for Bataan in the House of Representatives. She competed against Hermosa mayor Danilo Malana of Aksyon Demokratiko and won with more than 62% of the total votes and became the first ever transgender congresswoman in the Congress of the Philippines. Roman succeeded the incumbent, her mother Hermina Roman, who had a limited term.

As a neophyte, she, along with other elected lawmakers (collectively known as "equality champs"), launched the passage of the anti-discrimination bill on the basis of sexual orientation and gender identity (now known as the sogie Equality Bill) through a speech in the House of Representatives that garnered international support for LGBT rights in the Philippines. She also filed bills regarding eco-tourism, livelihood enhancements, agriculture advancements, health, and education, which were the advocacies of her family, and were focused on the first district of Bataan. She was named as one of the "13 Inspiring Women of 2016" by Time magazine in October 2016.

In March 2017, while stating that she personally was against the death penalty, Roman voted in favor of the measure in the House, citing pressure from the House leadership. House Speaker Alvarez has previously threatened those who would vote against the Duterte-backed measure, stating that he would strip lawmakers from their congressional leadership posts, which would affect all the advocacy bills of stripped members, including the Bataan-focused bills and SOGIE Equality Bill of Roman. In May, she left the Liberal and transferred to PDP–Laban, the current ruling political party of the Philippines, to hasten the House passage of the bills that she supported. In September, the SOGIE Equality Bill passed unanimously in the House of Representatives, after 17 years of political limbo, with no lawmakers voting against it. Additionally, the Free Wifi Internet Act, authored by Roman, was legislated into law. The law mandated the provisions for free wi-fi internet access in public areas.

In January 2018, Roman, along with the House Speaker, filed House Bill 6595 (the Civil Partnership Bill), which seeks to legalize civil unions, regardless of gender. In February, Roman became a reservist officer for the Armed Forces of the Philippines. In August, she filed the Regional Investment and Infrastructure Council Act, which sought to create special economic zones in Luzon. In September, Roman became the first committee chair of the newly created House Committee on Disaster Management. In October, she again pushed for the same-sex civil union bill, adding that the "sky will not fall" if the bill is passed. During the same month, she filed her certificate of candidacy for reelection in her district. In November 2018, during the first meeting of the House Committee on Disaster Management which she chairs, Roman prioritized the rehabilitation of the war-torn Islamic City of Marawi. By the end of the year, various measures authored by Roman were enacted into law. Some of these include the Senior Pension Act, which increased the monthly pensions of senior veterans, the Bataan Foundation Act, which declares January 11 as a holiday in her home province, and the Orani Foundation Act, which declares April 21 a holiday commemorating the foundation of Orani, her hometown.

In February 2019, the National Integrated Cancer Control Act, authored by Roman, was enacted into law. The measure institutionalized a national cancer control program in the country. In April, the Safe Spaces Act, authored by Roman, was passed into law. The measure defined gender-based sexual harassment in streets, public spaces, online, workplaces, and educational or training institutions while providing protective measures and prescribing penalties. In the May 2019 district elections, Roman ran for reelection under the PDP–Laban banner, competing against Emelita Justo Lubag of Katipunan ng Demokratikong Pilipino and won with 91% of the total votes.

In August 2019, Roman sought a probe on incidents of discrimination against trans people. She also campaigned for the Filipino LGBTQIA+ community to "demand from government what is due to us as human beings". Roman also refiled the SOGIE Equality Bill in the House after it was not enacted into law in the previous Congress, where the measure passed in the House but failed in the Senate. Roman asked the President to certify the SOGIE bill as urgent. However, by September, President Duterte withdrew support of the SOGIE Bill instead. In November, despite the setbacks, Roman continued to push for the bill, acknowledging that a gender-neutral bathroom policy would be a temporary solution in one of the issues raised.

In March 2020, Roman left PDP–Laban to join the Lakas–CMD. In November 2020, Roman called out a critic of the SOGIE Equality Bill who made false statements to create disinformation against the proposed measure. Just a couple of months after leaving Duterte's PDP–Laban, President Duterte attacked Roman, who he alleged was involved in an anomalous transaction project with the DPWH. Roman denied the allegations, citing Duterte's own words, wherein the president admitted on record that he does not have any verified information to back his accusation.

In May 2021, Roman pushed to include the intersex community in the draft SOGIE Equality Bill, however, conservative factions of the government blocked her proposal. In March, Roman again participated in the Semana Santa celebrations in Bataan. Her family has been spearheading the Catholic festivities for generations. In June, Roman launched an outreach program for the people of Bataan, providing necessities during the nationwide pandemic lockdown. She also sent in aid for the outreach program launched separately by the Bataan governor in August. In January 2022, amid the COVID-19 pandemic, an outbreak occurred in Bataan, resulting to many of the staff from Roman's office to become infected. Roman assured the public that her local office will reopen after following proper government protocols.

Due to her popularity in the first district of Bataan, no politician contested against her in the May 2022 district elections, leading to her third term victory. In November 2022, Roman launched her YouTube channel. In December 2022, the House passed the Barangay Skilled Workers Registry Act, authored by Roman, which mandates all barangays to create a registry of skilled works. Roman also filed a bill for the institutionalization of the second phase of the Agrarian Reform Act, which aims to distribute agricultural lands to qualified beneficiaries fully subsidized by the State.

In February 2023, the Freelance Workers Protection Act, authored by Roman, was passed in the House. The measure provides protection and incentives to freelance workers. In August 2023, on Earth Day, Roman called on for more environmental protection measures for the country. In December 2023, the Caregivers Welfare Act, authored by Roman, was signed into law. The measure institutes policies for the protection and welfare of caregivers in the practice of their profession.

In May 2024, the Eddie Garcia Act, authored by Roman, was signed into law. The act institutes policies for the protection and promotion of the welfare of workers and independent contractors in the film, television, and radio entertainment industry. In June, Roman urged President Marcos to certify the SOGIE Equality Bill as urgent legislation. In December, in an ambush interview, Roman apologized for her silence during the Duterte administration, citing that during that time, the government established a culture of silence especially against women politicians where opposition figures were either arrested or persecuted. She added that she had to safeguard her home district from the government. She also apologized to former senator Leila de Lima, who was unjustifiably imprisoned by Duterte. De Lima acknowledged she was hurt, but accepted Roman's apology, acknowledging her bravery for coming forward. On the same month, Roman announced that the House of Representative would process the impeachment complaints against vice president Sara Duterte, daughter of former president Rodrigo Duterte.

In February 2025, Roman was among the 95 Lakas–CMD members who voted to impeach vice president Sara Duterte. A total of 215 members or 70% of the House voted to impeach Duterte. In March, Roman voiced the need to review the Family Code, which prioritizes the husband over the wife in 11 of its articles. She also again voiced her support for the divorce bill, which has met support in the House but has buckled in the Senate. After the arrest of former president Duterte by the International Criminal Court (ICC), Roman pushed the government to rejoin the ranks of the ICC.

=== Political positions ===
==== Federalism ====
Roman expressed her support for a federal form of government in the Philippines, but stated that she will introduce a clause that aims to guarantee the country's territorial integrity as she perceives that a federal system without such clause will lead to separatism due to the country's various ethnic groups, geographies, and regionalism. She cited the Spanish federal system as a possible reference for the Philippines' federal prospects.

==== Habeas corpus ====
Roman voted to approve a bill to reinstate the death penalty in the Philippines during its final reading on March 29, 2017, which met criticism online. She explained that she needed to compromise in order for her other advocacies and projects to push through. Earlier, she expressed opposition to the bill and called for the respect of the rights of convicts for reformation. Roman held a survey to gauge the views of her constituents in first district of Bataan and 85 percent of participants in a survey she conducted favored death penalty.

==== Same-sex marriage ====
Roman is the vice-chairperson of the Women and Gender Equality Committee of the Philippine House of Representatives. She supports same-sex civil unions for the Philippines, but said the first priority should be an anti-discrimination law, followed by a revision of the family code. She believes that at the present time, a marriage equality bill will not pass in Congress, due to the present status quo, which is why campaigning for it should be a top priority in the coming decades. In September 2017, the SOGIE Equality Bill passed in the House. In late 2017, Roman filed a civil union bill that caters to both heterosexual couples and non-heterosexual couples. The bill is backed by the majority of lawmakers in the House of Representatives, including the House Speaker.

==== Health services ====
Roman is a member of the Health Committee of the House of Representatives. She has filed a Cancer Institute bill in the House which was passed into law last February of this year as well as a Caregiver's bill. Roman supports the Mental Health Law, which was passed in 2017. She has filed a Hospitals Classification Bill which seeks to standardize the equipment, facilities, and services of hospitals on the basis of their level of classification.

==== War veterans' rights ====
Roman is an advocate for war veteran rights in the Philippines. She is the incumbent chairperson for the Veteran Affairs and Welfare Committee in the House of Representatives. She has filed a bill seeking to increase the monthly pension of Filipino war veterans.

==== Tourism ====
Roman is an avid fan of history, culture, and the environment. She stated that her love for culture and the environment developed at home and was polished during her almost 20 years of stay in Spain, where she learned a lot about history and received two master's degrees. She has filed bills for the protection and conservation of numerous tourist sites in the first district of Bataan.

==== Education ====
Roman supports higher education in the Philippines. She has filed the Unified Student Financial Assistance System for Tertiary Students (UNIFAST) bill in the House of Representatives. Additionally, she has filed a bill which seeks to mandate the government to open all of its books to the people via online library.

==== Indigenous people's rights ====
Roman has filed a bill seeking to increase the representation of indigenous peoples in the Subic Bay Metropolitan Authority, which is near her home province of Bataan.

==== Agriculture and aquaculture ====
Roman has filed bills on the sustainability of agriculture and aquaculture in the province of Bataan. She has also filed the re-allotment of public lands and urban lands for agricultural lands.

== Military career ==
Roman is the first transgender military officer and reservist of the Armed Forces of the Philippines commissioned as Lieutenant Colonel.

== Personal life ==
Roman is a transgender woman. In the 1990s, Roman underwent sex reassignment surgery, had her name legally changed, and legally changed her gender to "female". She did it through an appeal through the Regional Trial Court.

Roman had a long-term Spanish partner in Spain; they were not married and were separated in 2022. . Aside from her native Tagalog, she also speaks English, Spanish, French and Italian. She is member of the Philippine Academy of the Spanish Language. She is a practicing Catholic.

== Electoral history ==
Electoral history of Geraldine Roman
| Year | Office | Party | Votes received | | | | Result |
| Year | Office | Party | Total | % | P. | Swing | Result |
|---|---|---|---|---|---|---|---|
| 2016 | Representative (Bataan–1st) | Liberal | 106,015 | —N/a | 1st | —N/a | Won |
| 2019 | Representative (Bataan–1st) | PDP–Laban | 152,253 | —N/a | 1st | —N/a | Won |
| 2022 | Representative (Bataan–1st) | Lakas | 107,496 | 100.00% | 1st | —N/a | Unopposed |

== Awards and recognitions ==
- 100 Leading Global Thinkers of 2016 by US-based Foreign Policy magazine
- Part of "Inspiring Women of 2016" list by Time magazine
