= Hortensia Starke =

Filipino politician and sugar planter (c. 1921–2010)

Member of the House of Representatives of the Philippines from Negros Occidental's 6th congressional district
- In office 1987–1995

Personal details
- Born: c. 1921
- Died: November 29, 2010 (aged 89) Talisay, Negros Occidental, Philippines
- Occupation: Sugar planter, politician

Hortensia Laguda Starke (c. 1921 – November 29, 2010), was a Filipino sugar planter and politician. She represented the sixth district of Negros Occidental in the House of Representatives of the Philippines from 1987 to 1995. Before entering Congress, she headed an organisation of sugar planters and criticised the sugar-trading system associated with President Ferdinand Marcos and businessman Roberto Benedicto. During the administration of Corazon Aquino, she became a prominent congressional opponent of redistributive agrarian reform.

== Sugar-industry activity ==
Starke owned and operated sugarcane plantations in Negros Occidental. A 1992 Supreme Court decision described her as a financed sugar planter whose operations depended on crop loans from the Philippine National Bank.

In 1985, The Christian Science Monitor identified Starke as the outspoken head of the New Alliance of Sugar Planters. During a severe downturn in the Negros sugar economy, she accused Benedicto—an ally of Marcos who controlled the government's sugar-trading bodies—of exploiting planters. Starke separately challenged the Philippine Sugar Commission and the National Sugar Trading Corporation over proceeds from her 1979–1981 crops. The Supreme Court denied her petition in 1992, holding that the Philippine National Bank had been authorised to sell the mortgaged sugar and apply the proceeds to her loans.

== House of Representatives ==
Starke served in the Eighth and Ninth Congresses, representing Negros Occidental's sixth district from 1987 through 1995. GMA News later described her as both a fierce critic of the Marcos government and an advocate for reform of the sugar industry.

Agrarian reform became the position for which Starke was most widely discussed during her congressional career. Political scientist Benedict Anderson identified her as a major sugar planter in western Negros and as one of the landowners serving on the House Committee on Agrarian Reform. In public argument, Starke likened inherited land to a person's most valued dress and portrayed compulsory redistribution as destabilising. Later scholarship characterised her as a leading opponent of agrarian reform within the landed bloc of the House.

In February 1988, Starke and Representative Romeo Guanzon led the filing of House Bill 941, an alternative agrarian-reform proposal. Writing in the journal Asian Studies, Sabino G. Padilla Jr. criticised the bill for having an unclear timetable and failing to define its intended beneficiaries. A contemporaneous United Press International report likewise placed Starke among the landowners who secured changes weakening a pending House land-reform measure.

== Death ==
Starke died from heart failure aged 89 at her home in Talisay, Negros Occidental. The Philippine Daily Inquirer reported that she died on November 29, 2010, while GMA News listed her date of death as December 1. Former Negros Occidental governor Daniel Lacson Jr. remembered her as a strong advocate for sugar-industry reform, while former governor and Sugar Regulatory Administration head Rafael Coscolluela described her as outspoken and fearless in advancing her causes.
