= Herminia Roman =

Herminia B. Roman
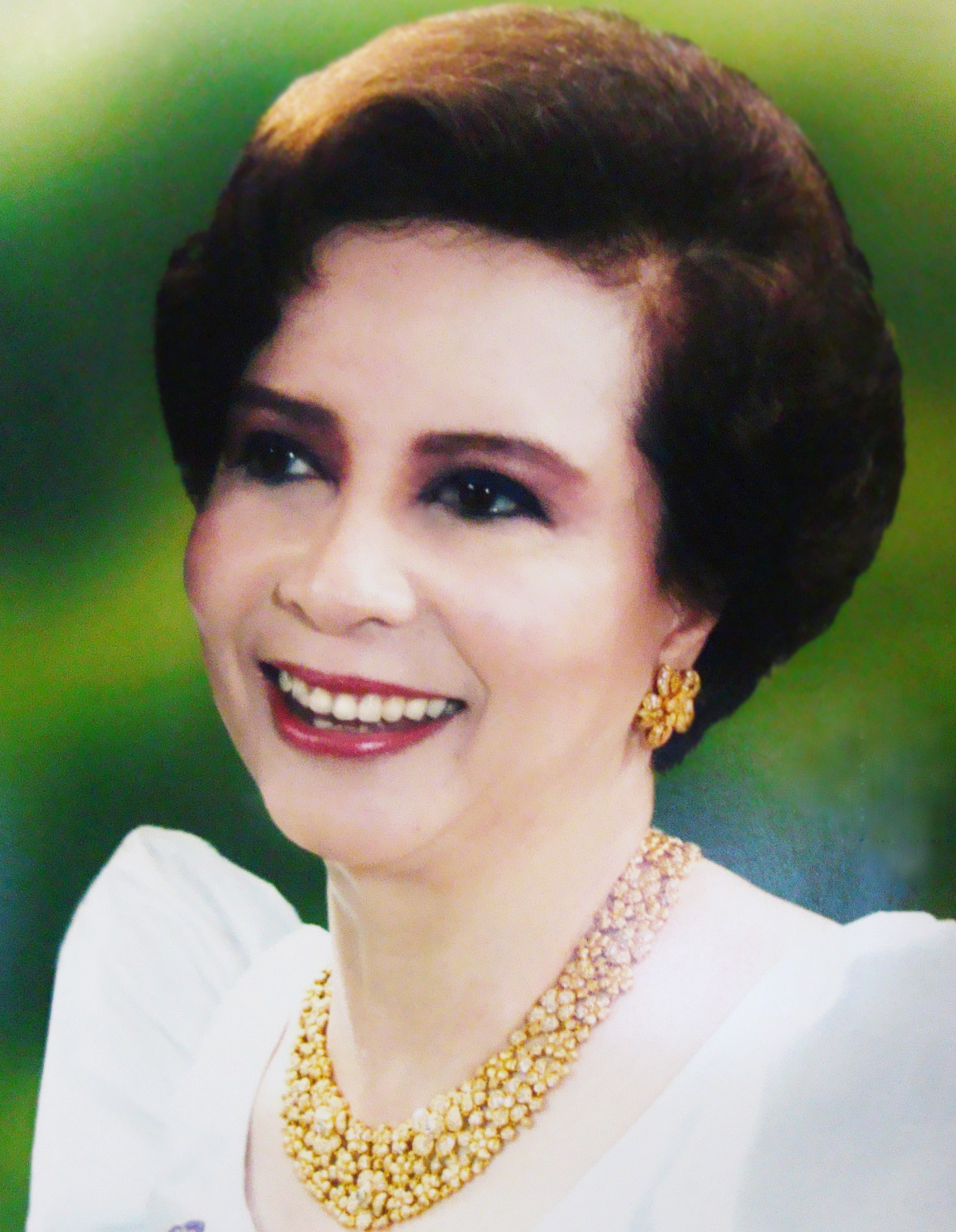

Member of the Philippine House of Representatives from Bataan's First District
- In office June 30, 2007 – June 30, 2016
- Preceded by: Antonino Roman
- Succeeded by: Geraldine Roman

Personal details
- Born: Herminia Zarate Batista; July 9, 1940 (age 86) Biñan, Laguna, Commonwealth of the Philippines
- Party: Liberal (2011–present)
- Other political affiliations: Lakas (2006–2011)
- Spouse: Antonino Roman, Jr.
- Children: 4 (including Geraldine, Antonino III)
- Education: St. Scholastica's College (BS); New York University (MBA)
- Profession: Politician

Herminia Batista Roman (née Batista, born July 9, 1940) is a Filipino politician. She was a member of the House of Representatives of the Philippines under the Liberal Party, representing the 1st District of Bataan from 2007 to 2016. She was succeeded by her daughter, Geraldine Roman.

== Early life and education ==
Herminia B. Roman was born on July 9, 1940, in Biñan, Laguna to Dr. Marcelino Zarate Batista and Nicomedesa Vizconde Reyes. She is the third of four children and has three half-siblings from her mother's first marriage. She took her elementary education at Biñan Elementary School from 1946 to 1952. She finished her secondary education at St. Scholastica's College in 1956. She finished her college degree at St. Scholastica's College, Manila in 1960, and obtained her master's degree in Business Administration from New York University in 1964.

== Accomplishments ==
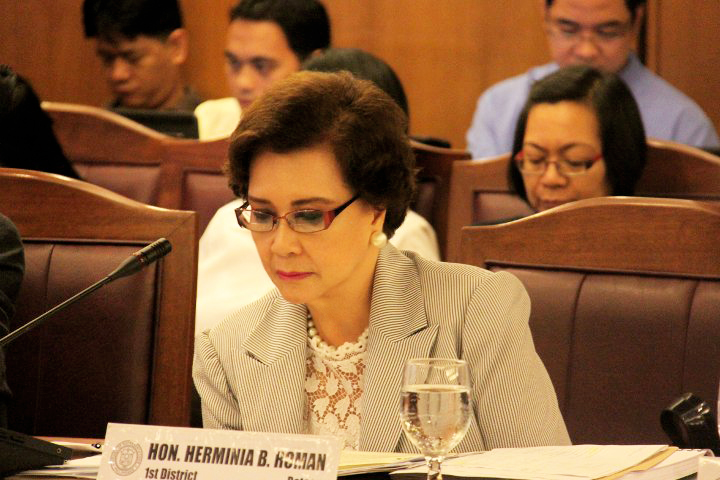
Roman during a Philippine House of Representatives session

Roman's legislative advocacy focus is on health, education, livelihood, women's rights and environmental concerns, making sure that all government programs and initiatives should center on sustainability and affordability, consistent with the State's mandate of promoting the general welfare of the Filipino people.

To advance her goals, she filed, co-authored and supported bills and resolutions which promote the rights and privileges of women, the elderly and the veterans across the country as well as environmental concerns. Locally, she pursued programs beneficial to her constituency, such as medical health assistance, scholarships, and livelihood projects.

She founded the KABAKA (Kababaihan ng Bataan Tungo sa Kaunlaran) in December 1997, and Kinatawan Foundation Inc. in 1999. Both are women's organizations which emphasize self-reliance by the way of the "teach-the-man-how-to-fish" approach, giving her constituents the opportunity to rise above their present conditions.

Always curious about possible livelihood opportunities, she organized and sponsored various seminars on flower arrangement, hair science and beauty culture, fish and meat processing, soap making, scented candle making, paper recycling, and perfume making.

Her most recent project is the Moral Recovery Seminar, which aims to mobilize all Filipinos for nation-building through the practical exercise of human values in our daily lives as citizens and to awaken us all to the power of these values in achieving our individual and national goals. It seeks the empowerment of all our people- the poor, the middle class and the rich through the sustained application of human values and a code of collective existence.

== Membership in organizations ==
1963 to 1984 - (Member) Christian Family Movement

1989 to Present - (President) Romanville Realty & Development Corporation

1995 to Present - (Member) Couples for Christ

1997 to Present - KABAKA (Kababaihan Tungo sa Kaunlaran)

1998 to 2004 - (Member) Congressional Spouses Foundation Inc.

1999 to Present - (President & CEO) Kinatawan Foundation Inc.

2004 to 2007 - (Director, Region III) Congressional Spouses Foundation Inc.

== Awards and recognition ==
- 2008 Principal Author

Republic Act 9499

"Filipino World War II Pensions & Benefits Act of 2008" signed by H.E. President Gloria Macapagal-Arroyo on April 9, 2008, in celebration of "Araw ng Kagitingan"

- 2000 - 2001 Mae Carvell Awardee

Venture Club of Americas - Bataan

For Uplifting the Spirit of Women and Children

- 1999 - 2000 Woman of Distinction Awardee

Soroptomist International - Bataan

For Making a Difference for Women

- December 1997 Organized the Kababaihan Tungo sa Kaunlaran (KABAKA)

It has grown into 35,000 women members with the objective of "Dagdag Kaalaman Para sa Dagdag Kita"

== Personal life ==
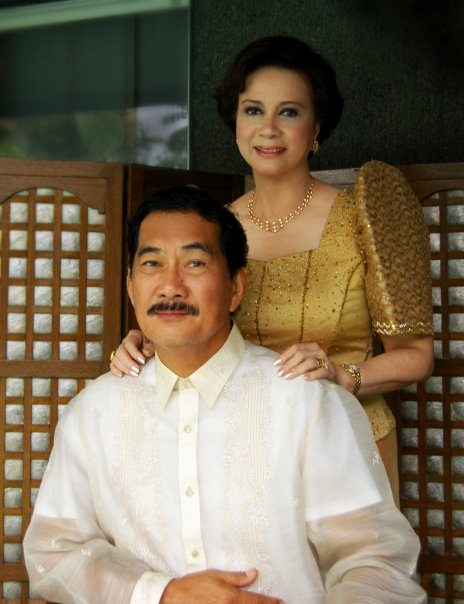
1st District of Bataan Rep. Herminia Roman and PLLO Sec. Antonino Roman

Herminia married Antonino Pascual Roman of Orani, Bataan, a former Representative of the 1st District of Bataan and the Presidential Legislative Liaison Office (PLLO) Secretary, until his death in 2014. They have four children: Renato Marcelino (a medical doctor), Geraldine - a member of the House of Representatives (as of 2016), Antonino III (a lawyer) and Regina (a freelance artist). She is a member of Couples for Christ and the Christian Family Movement. She is president and chief executive officer of Romanville Realty & Devt. Corp. from 1989 to present. Rep. Roman is also a collector of antiques.

House of Representatives of the Philippines
Preceded by Antonino P. Roman	Representative, 1st District of Bataan; 2007–present	Succeeded by Geraldine Roman
