= Maguindanao del Norte's at-large congressional district =

Legislative district of the Philippines

- Constituency for the House of Representatives of the Philippines
- Map
- Location of Maguindanao del Norte within the Philippines
- Province: Maguindanao del Norte
- Region: Bangsamoro
- Population: 1,105,061 (2025)
- Electorate: 450,023 (2025)
- Major settlements: 12 LGUs: Cities; Cotabato City; Municipalities; Barira; Buldon; Datu Blah T. Sinsuat; Datu Odin Sinsuat; Kabuntalan; Matanog; Northern Kabuntalan; Parang; Sultan Kudarat; Sultan Mastura; Upi
- Area: 3,988.82 km^{2} (1,540.09 sq mi)

Current constituency
- Created: 2022
- Representative: Sittie Shahara Mastura
- Political party: Lakas–CMD
- Congressional bloc: Majority

Maguindanao del Norte's at-large congressional district refers to the lone congressional districts of the Philippines in the province of Maguindanao del Norte and the independent component city of Cotabato. It has been represented in the House of Representatives since the province's creation in 2022. It is currently represented in the 20th Congress by Sittie Shahara "Bai Dimple" Mastura of Lakas-CMD, who has represented the district since its creation.

== Representation history ==
| # | Image | Member | Term of office | | Congress | Party | Electoral history |
| # | Image | Member | Start | End | Congress | Party | Electoral history |
|---|---|---|---|---|---|---|---|
=== Maguindanao del Norte's at-large district for the House of Representatives of the Philippines ===
District created September 18, 2022
| 1 | | Sittie Shahara I. Mastura | September 18, 2022 | Incumbent | 19th | Lakas | Redistricted from Maguindanao's 1st district. |
| 1 | | Sittie Shahara I. Mastura | September 18, 2022 | Incumbent | 20th | Lakas | Re-elected in 2025. |

== Election results ==
=== 2025 ===
| Candidate | Party | Votes | % |
|---|---|---|---|
| Dimple Mastura (incumbent) | Lakas–CMD | 231,745 | 65.98 |
| Bai Sandra Sema | United Bangsamoro Justice Party | 117,263 | 33.38 |
| Sittie Mariefa Gascon | Independent | 2,248 | 0.64 |
| Total | | 351,256 | 100.00 |
| Registered voters/turnout | | 530,526 | – |
| Lakas–CMD hold | | | |
Source: Commission on Elections
