= Emmi de Jesus =

Filipina politician

Personal details
- Born: Emerenciana de Jesus
- Party: GABRIELA

Emerenciana "Emmi" de Jesus is a Filipina politician who is a former member of the House of Representatives of the Philippines, and is affiliated with the feminist political party GABRIELA.

On December 4, 2024, de Jesus and 74 others filed the second impeachment complaint against Vice President Sara Duterte, submitting one article of impeachment: betrayal of public trust.

== Political views ==
She along with Arlene Brosas have been critical of Gloria Macapagal Arroyo's disputed election as Speaker of the House, accusing her of being power-hungry and a "Cheater for All Seasons". She strongly opposes the Philippine drug war, and said that the death of Kian delos Santos should be a moment of reckoning for its supporters. She also said that "Kian is the face of failure of 'Oplan Double Barrel'".
