= Kusug Tausug =

Party-list in the Philippines

Kusug Tausug كُسُݢْ تَؤُسُوْݢْ
- — Philippine partylist —
- Ideology: Tausūg interests Sulu Archipelago regionalism & nationalism
- Colors: Green
- Slogan: "Pagbaubug ha kamarwan iban martabbat." (transl. To defend for one's prestige and honor/dignity.)

Current representation (20th Congress)
- Seats in the House of Representatives: 1 / 3 (Out of 63 party-list seats)
- Representative(s): Aiman Tan

Kusug Tausug (lit. 'Tausug power') is a political organization which has party-list representation in the House of Representatives of the Philippines. It seeks to represent the Tausūg indigenous people and other marginalized sectors.

== History ==
=== 17th Congress ===
Kusug Tausug took part in the 2016 Philippine elections, where they secured a lone seat in the House of Representatives. The seat was filled in by Shernee Tan-Tambut, daughter of Sulu governor Abdusakur Mahail Tan.

Shernee Tan proposed the martial law in Mindanao, imposed in response to the Marawi siege of 2017, to be expanded nationwide.

Kusug Tausug was among the political organizations in the House of Representatives that joined the Coalition for Change of PDP-Laban, the new ruling party.

=== 18th Congress ===
They participated in the 2019 Philippine elections, where they retained their lone seat in the House of Representatives. Shernee Tan also remained as Kusug Tausug's representative in the Congress.

Tan as Kusug Tausug representative was critical of the interim Bangsamoro Transition Authority (BTA) government in Bangsamoro. She opposed the BTA's request to extend the interim period and postpone the scheduled 2022 Bangsamoro elections as per the Bangsamoro Organic Law, saying the move was meant to cover up the BTA's inadequate performance. Although Tan has been amenable to the election postponement if a referendum was held for the measure.

Kusug Tausug through Tan also proposed mandating government and private establishments to allot at least two places of worship in response to the lack of space for adherents of Islam and other non-Catholic faiths.

== Electoral history ==
Election	Votes	%	Seats
2016	247,487	0.76	1 / 59
2019	228,224	0.82	1 / 61
2022	385,770	1.05	1 / 63
2025	365,916	0.87	1 / 63

== Representatives to Congress ==
Period	Representative
17th Congress; 2016–2019	Shernee Tan-Tambut
18th Congress; 2019–2022	Shernee Tan-Tambut
19th Congress; 2022–2025	Shernee Tan-Tambut
20th Congress; 2025–2028	Aiman Tan
Note: A party-list group, can win a maximum of three seats in the House of Representatives.
