= Leovigildo Banaag =

Filipino politician (1943–2011)

Leovigildo B. Banaag
- Official portrait, 2004

Member of the Philippine House of Representatives from Agusan del Norte's First District
- In office June 30, 1998 – June 30, 2007
- Preceded by: Charito B. Plaza
- Succeeded by: Jose Aquino II

Personal details
- Born: December 31, 1943 Butuan, Commonwealth of the Philippines
- Died: January 6, 2011 (aged 67) Davao City, Philippines
- Party: Lakas-CMD (2004-2011)
- Other political affiliations: LDP (2001-2004); LAMMP (1998-2001)
- Spouse: Pearl Famador (deceased)
- Children: Trisha Ysobelle, Jan Gilbert
- Education: San Beda College
- Profession: Politician, Lawyer

Leovigildo Briones Banaag (Tagalog: [bɾiˈjonɛs bɐˈnaʔag]; December 31, 1943 – January 6, 2011) was a lawyer and a Congressman in the Philippine House of Representatives for 3 consecutive terms from 1998 to 2007.

== Early life and career ==
Banaag was born on December 31, 1943, in Butuan. He graduated cum laude in both Bachelor of Arts in 1964 and Bachelor of Laws in 1968 at San Beda College. He was admitted to the Integrated Bar of the Philippines on March 14, 1969 and has been a law practitioner ever since. Married to Pearl Famador(†), they had two children, Trisha Ysobelle and Jan Gilbert.

Banaag began his career in politics in 1980 when he was elected as a Provincial board member of Agusan del Norte. Since then he had held several positions, as a Councilor of Butuan (1988–1995) and then Vice Mayor of Butuan (1995–1998), while holding other positions as well.

== House of Representatives ==
After just one term as Vice Mayor of Butuan, Banaag was elected as District Representative for the First District of Agusan del Norte in 1998, serving Butuan and Las Nieves, Agusan del Norte. He was a Chairman of the House Committee on Natural Resources, as well as a Member of several other House Committees, including Agrarian Reform, Ethics, Good Government, and Ways and Means, among others.

== Death ==
Leovigildo Banaag died of cardiac arrest, aged 67, at Davao Doctors Hospital, Davao City on January 6, 2011.

House of Representatives of the Philippines
Preceded by Charito B. Plaza	Representative, 1st District of Agusan del Norte; June 30, 1998 – June 30, 2007	Succeeded by Jose Aquino II
