= Legislative districts of Agusan =

Legislative District of the Philippines

The legislative district of Agusan was the representation of the historical province of Agusan in the various national legislatures of the Philippines until 1969. Butuan also remained part of the province's representation even after becoming a chartered city in 1950.

The undivided province's representation encompassed the present-day provinces of Agusan del Norte and Agusan del Sur, and the highly urbanized city of Butuan.

== History ==
Initially being excluded from representation in the lower house of the Philippine Legislature in 1907, the then-non-Christian-majority areas of the Philippines — which included the Department of Mindanao and Sulu, of which Agusan was part — were finally extended legislative representation with the passage of the Philippine Autonomy Act in 1916 by the United States Congress. The Revised Administrative Code (Act No. 2711) enacted on March 10, 1917, further elaborated on the manner by which these areas would be represented. The non-Christian areas were to be collectively represented in the upper house's 12th senatorial district by two senators, both appointed by the Governor-General. Five assembly members, also appointed by the Governor-General, were to represent the seven component provinces of Department of Mindanao and Sulu — Agusan, Bukidnon, Cotabato, Davao, Lanao, Sulu and Zamboanga — in the lower house as a single at-large district. These arrangements remained in place despite the abolition of the department in 1920.

The voters of Agusan Province were finally given the right to elect their own representative through popular vote beginning in 1935 by virtue of Article VI, Section 1 of the 1935 Constitution.

During the Second World War, the province of Agusan sent two delegates to the National Assembly of the Japanese-sponsored Second Philippine Republic: one was the provincial governor (an ex officio member), while the other was elected through a provincial assembly of KALIBAPI members during the Japanese occupation of the Philippines. Upon the restoration of the Philippine Commonwealth in 1945 the province retained its pre-war lone congressional district. When Butuan became a chartered city in 1950, it remained part of the representation of Agusan, per Section 89 of Republic Act No. 523.

Republic Act No. 4979, approved by plebiscite held simultaneously with the 1967 elections, split the old Agusan Province into Agusan del Norte and Agusan del Sur and provided them each with a congressional representative. In accordance with Section 7 of Republic Act No. 4979, the two new provinces first elected their separate representatives starting in the 1969 elections.

== Lone District (defunct) ==
- includes Butuan (chartered in 1950)

Period	Representative
1st National Assembly; 1935–1938	Apolonio D. Curato
2nd National Assembly; 1938–1941	Apolonio D. Curato
1st Commonwealth Congress; 1941–1946	Elisa R. Ochoa
1st Congress; 1946–1949	Marcos M. Calo
2nd Congress; 1949–1953	Marcos M. Calo
3rd Congress; 1953–1957	Guillermo R. Sanchez
4th Congress; 1957–1961	Guillermo R. Sanchez
5th Congress; 1961–1965	Guillermo R. Sanchez
6th Congress; 1965–1969	Jose C. Aquino

== At-large (defunct) ==
Period	Representatives
National Assembly; 1943–1944	Elisa R. Ochoa
National Assembly; 1943–1944	Ramon Z. Aguirre (ex officio)

== See also ==
- Legislative districts of Mindanao and Sulu
- Legislative district of Agusan del Norte
- Legislative district of Agusan del Sur
