= Agusan's at-large congressional district =

Legislative district of the Philippines

- Former constituency for the National Assembly of the Philippines and House of Representatives of the Philippines
- Province: Agusan

Former constituency
- Created: 1935 (first creation); 1943 (second creation); 1945 (third creation)
- Abolished: 1943 (first abolition); 1945 (second abolition); 1967 (third abolition)

Agusan's at-large congressional district may refer to several occasions when a provincewide at-large district was used for elections to Philippine national legislatures from the formerly undivided province of Agusan.

Agusan was created as a special province from territories previously organized under Surigao and parts of Misamis in 1907. As a special province, Agusan was under the direct supervision of the Department of the Interior Bureau of Non-Christian Tribes and was unrepresented in the Philippine Assembly. In 1913, the province was transferred to the direct control and jurisdiction of the Department of Mindanao and Sulu whose representatives to the national legislature were appointed by the Governor General as one at-large district beginning with the 4th Philippine Legislature in 1916. In 1934 following the passage of the Tydings–McDuffie Act, Agusan elected its own delegate for the first time to the 1934 Philippine Constitutional Convention which was charged with the drafting of a new constitution for the Commonwealth of the Philippines. The province then began to send a representative to the Commonwealth National Assembly from its single-member at-large district created under the 1935 constitution.

Agusan was also represented in the Second Republic National Assembly during the Pacific War. It also elected a representative to the restored House of Representatives and to the first six congresses of the Third Philippine Republic. After the 1967 division of Agusan, the district was abolished and replaced by Agusan del Norte's and Agusan del Sur's at-large districts.

== List of members representing the district ==
=== National Assembly (1935–1945) ===
==== Commonwealth ====
Portrait	Member	Term of office		Legislature	Party	Electoral history	Constituent LGUs
Portrait	Member	Start	End	Legislature	Party	Electoral history	Constituent LGUs
District created February 8, 1935.
	Apolonio Curato	November 15, 1935	December 30, 1941	1st National Assembly	Nacionalista Democrata Pro-Independencia (Liga Popular Aguseña)	Elected in 1935.	1935–1941 [data missing]
	Apolonio Curato	November 15, 1935	December 30, 1941	2nd National Assembly	Nacionalista (Liga Popular Aguseña)	Re-elected in 1938.	1935–1941 [data missing]

==== Second Republic ====
Seat A						Seat B						Legislature	Constituent LGUs
Portrait	Member	Term of office		Party	Electoral history	Portrait	Member	Term of office		Party	Electoral history	Legislature	Constituent LGUs
Portrait	Member	Start	End	Party	Electoral history	Portrait	Member	Start	End	Party	Electoral history	Legislature	Constituent LGUs
District re-created September 7, 1943.
	Elisa Ochoa	September 25, 1943	February 2, 1944	KALIBAPI	Elected in 1943.		Ramon Aguirre	September 25, 1943	February 2, 1944	KALIBAPI	Appointed as an ex officio member. (Note: As Governor of Agusan.)	National Assembly (Second Republic)	1943–1944 [data missing]

=== House of Representatives (1945–1973) ===
Portrait	Member	Term of office		Legislature	Party	Electoral history	Constituent LGUs
Portrait	Member	Start	End	Legislature	Party	Electoral history	Constituent LGUs
District re-created May 24, 1945.
	Elisa Ochoa	June 9, 1945	May 25, 1946	1st Commonwealth Congress	Nacionalista	Elected in 1941.	1945–1969 [data missing]
	Marcos Calo	May 25, 1946	December 30, 1953	2nd Commonwealth Congress	Liberal	Elected in 1946.	1945–1969 [data missing]
	Marcos Calo	May 25, 1946	December 30, 1953	1st Congress	Liberal	Elected in 1946.	1945–1969 [data missing]
	Marcos Calo	May 25, 1946	December 30, 1953	2nd Congress	Liberal	Re-elected in 1949.	1945–1969 [data missing]
	Guillermo Sanchez	December 30, 1953	December 30, 1965	3rd Congress	Nacionalista	Elected in 1953.	1945–1969 [data missing]
	Guillermo Sanchez	December 30, 1953	December 30, 1965	4th Congress	Nacionalista	Re-elected in 1957.	1945–1969 [data missing]
	Guillermo Sanchez	December 30, 1953	December 30, 1965	5th Congress	Nacionalista	Re-elected in 1961.	1945–1969 [data missing]
	Jose C. Aquino	December 30, 1965	December 30, 1969	6th Congress	Liberal	Elected in 1965.	1945–1969 [data missing]
District dissolved into Agusan del Norte's and Agusan del Sur's at-large districts.

== Election results ==
=== 1953 ===
1953 Philippine House of Representatives elections in Agusan
Party	Candidate	Votes	%
Nacionalista	Guillermo Sanchez	24,467	56.57
Liberal	Marcos Calo (incumbent)	18,784	43.43
Democratic	Francisco Cupin	0	0.00
Total votes		43,251	100.00
Nacionalista gain from Liberal			

=== 1965 ===
1965 Philippine House of Representatives elections in Agusan
Party	Candidate	Votes	%
Liberal	Jose C. Aquino	59,341	57.89
Nacionalista	Guillermo Sanchez (incumbent)	43,166	42.11
Liberal (ind.)	Juan Tiu	0	0.00
Total votes		102,507	100.00
Liberal gain from Nacionalista			

== See also ==
- Legislative districts of Agusan del Norte
- Legislative districts of Agusan del Sur
