= Elisa Ochoa =

Filipino politician (1897–1978)

Elisa R. Ochoa

Member of the House of Representatives of the Commonwealth of the Philippines from Agusan's lone district
- In office June 11, 1945 – May 25, 1946
- Preceded by: District reestablished
- Succeeded by: Marcos Calo

Member of the National Assembly from Agusan
- In office September 25, 1943 – February 2, 1944 Serving with Ramón Z. Aguirre

Personal details
- Born: Elisa Villanueva Rosales; December 3, 1897 Butuan, Agusan, Captaincy General of the Philippines
- Died: September 20, 1978 (aged 80) Butuan, Agusan del Norte, Philippines
- Party: Nacionalista (1941-1942; 1945-1978); KALIBAPI (1942-1945)
- Spouse: Enrique Ochoa
- Education: National University (A.A.)

Elisa Rosales Ochoa (December 3, 1897 – September 20, 1978) is a Philippine nurse and politician. She was the first woman elected to the Philippine Congress in 1941.

== Background ==
Ochoa was born in Butuan, in what was then-undivided province of Agusan. Her parents were Canuto Rosales and Ramona Villanueva and she was the second of their four children.

In 1915, Ochoa became a licensed nurse after completing her studies at the Philippine General Hospital. She married Enrique Ochoa, a physician and spent the next several years working at different hospitals as a nurse.

In 1934, Ochoa returned to schooling, finally obtaining a high school diploma. By 1936, she had obtained an associate of arts degree from the National University. After passing a civil service examination for nursing superintendents in law school.

== First woman member of Congress ==
In 1937, the right of suffrage was extended to Filipino women after a law allowing the same was approved via plebiscite. Elections for the House of Representatives were scheduled for 1941. Ochoa interrupted her law school studies to return home and run for the National Assembly representing the province of Agusan. Ochoa won the election on November 11, 1941. She was the only woman to win one of the 96 seats.

Ochoa would not have the opportunity to fully serve out her term. Less than a month after her election, the Japanese invasion of the Philippines commenced, and the National Assembly was unable to convene until it was reorganized under the control of the Japanese in 1943. Ochoa nonetheless tried to perform her official duties as a member of Congress. She was active in humanitarian efforts during the Second World War. After the restoration of the Commonwealth government under President Sergio Osmeña, Ochoa resumed her duties as the duly elected Congresswoman of Agusan.

== Later life ==
Ochoa's term expired in 1946, and she was not a member of the 1st Congress that was elected in that year. Still, Ochoa remained in public service, acting as a presidential technical assistant on health to Presidents Ramon Magsaysay and Carlos P. Garcia. She would also help establish a school for midwifery in her hometown, Butuan.

Ochoa died on September 20, 1978, at the age of 80. She is buried in Butuan. She left a daughter, Aida Veloso, and 2 grandchildren.

== Sources ==
- Filipinos in History Volume V. Philippines: National Historical Institute. 1996. pp. 259–260.
