= 2019 Philippine general election =

- Registered: 63,665,944
- Turnout: 46,937,139 (74.31% ▼6.38pp from 2016)
- Senate election

12 (of the 24) seats to the Senate of the Philippines 13 seats needed for a majority
Alliance	Hugpong	8D	NPC (Note: There were 2 NPC candidates in this election. One (JV Ejercito) ran under the senatorial ticket of Hugpong ng Pagbabago (HNP); the other (Lito Lapid) was not included in any ticket; it was Lapid who won a seat. The figures here are for Lapid; Ejercito's vote totals are included in the HNP totals.)
Seats won	9	0	1
Popular vote	203,023,825	50,038,801	16,965,464
Percentage	56.23%	13.82%	4.68%
Senate President before election
Tito Sotto
NPC
Elected Senate President
Tito Sotto
NPC
- House of Representatives election
- All 304 seats in the House of Representatives of the Philippines; 153 seats needed for a majority
Party	Vote %	Seats	+/–
PDP–Laban	31.22	82	+79
Nacionalista	16.10	42	+18
NPC	14.31	37	−5
NUP	9.51	25	+2
Liberal	5.73	18	−97
Lakas	5.11	12	+8
Others	15.11	27	+16
Party-list	—	61	+2
This lists parties that won seats. See the complete results below.
Speaker before	Speaker after
Gloria Macapagal Arroyo; PDP–Laban	Alan Peter Cayetano; Nacionalista

The 2019 Philippine general election was conducted on May 13, 2019. This was a midterm election, and those elected took office on June 30, 2019, midway through the term of President Rodrigo Duterte.

The following positions were contested:

- 12 of the 24 seats in the Senate of the Philippines
- All 304 seats in the House of Representatives of the Philippines
- All governors, vice governors and regular members of the Sangguniang Panlalawigan (Provincial Councils) in the provinces of the Philippines
- All mayors, vice mayors and regular members of the Sangguniang Panlungsod (City Councils) or Sangguniang Bayan (Municipal Councils) in the cities or municipalities of the Philippines

Under the Local Government Code and the 1987 constitution, all terms start on June 30, 2019, and end on June 30, 2022, except for elected senators, whose terms shall end on June 30, 2025. The Commission on Elections administered the election.

== Preparation ==
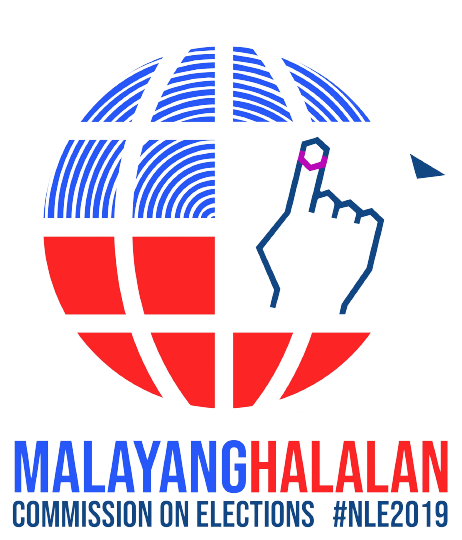
Logo of the 2019 NLE used in official promotional and awareness campaigns.

=== Date of the election ===
The 1987 Constitution of the Philippines states that unless otherwise provided by law, the election of members of Congress is on every second Monday of May. According to Republic Act No. 7166, election for national, provincial, city and municipal elections are on the second Monday of May, since 1992, and every three years thereafter, with the president and vice president being elected in six-year intervals. It has been three years since the last general election of 2016, and with no law canceling the election, this meant that the election was held on Monday, May 13, 2019.

The commission confirmed the day of the election day of May 13 when it released the calendar for the election. The important days are:

- Filing of candidacies and nominations for party-list representatives: October 11 to 12, and October 15 to 17, 2018
- Campaign period
  - For Senate and party-list elections: February 12 to May 11, 2019
  - For district congressional and local elections: March 29 to May 11, 2019
- Substitution of candidates: November 30 to 12:00 p.m. of May 13, 2019
- Election silence: April 18 to 19 and May 12 to 13, 2019
- Election day: May 13, 2019
- Deadline of filing of expenses: June 12, 2019

=== Automated election system ===
The Philippines adopted an automated election system (AES) for the 2019 elections. The COMELEC announced in December 2018 that the Philippine AES passed the review conducted by international systems and software testing firm, Pro V&V, in Alabama, USA.

The Commission had a 'trusted build' program wherein the program to be used in the midterms in 2019 is built using the reviewed components. Commissioner Marlon Casquejo on December 17, 2018 turned over the executable file of the Election Management System (EMS) Trusted Build for the May 13, 2019 National and Local Elections (NLE) to the Commission en banc. The file will be escrowed to the Bangko Sentral ng Pilipinas.

The EMS compiled the number and profile of registered voters, their geographic locations and polling precinct information, and these were used in designing the official ballots.

=== Equipment ===
The Commission on Elections made a decision on February 1, 2018 to purchase vote-counting machines (VCM), which were used in the 2016 presidential election for a price of 2.122 billion pesos for the 2019 mid-term elections.

=== Commission on Elections membership ===
On October 17, 2017, the House of Representatives impeached Commission on Elections Chairman Andres Bautista due to allegations of manipulation of the 2016 vice presidential election in favor of Leni Robredo. Hours earlier, Bautista announced his resignation effective December 31. President Duterte accepted Bautista's resignation effective immediately, on October 23. Duterte then appointed Sheriff Abas as new chairman, in November 2017.

The Commission on Appointments confirmed Duterte's appointment of Abas as chairman in May 2018. Abas was expected to head the commission on the 2019 elections. At the confirmation hearing, Abas defended the commission's purchase of the vote-counting machines, saying that they were purchased at one-third of the cost. The commission later confirmed Duterte's appointment of Socorro Inting as commissioner later that month. Duterte also appointed Marlon S. Casquejo as commissioner on June and Undersecretary of Justice Antonio Kho as commissioner on July, completing the commission's seven seats.

== Proposed cancellation ==
Due to the drive to change the constitution to make the Philippines a federation, Speaker of the House of Representatives Pantaleon Alvarez said in January 2018 that the cancellation of the 2019 elections was possible, as a transition government would be needed. Later, Duterte ruled out the cancellation the election.

By July, after the consultative committee submitted their draft constitution to Duterte and Congress, Alvarez proposed to cancel the 2019 elections so that Congress could concentrate on revising the constitution. Senate President Tito Sotto said that this was possible by Congress passing a law for the cancellation of the election. Members of the consultative committee, on the other hand, preferred holding the election. Aquilino Pimentel Jr. said that "I suggest elections will continue (because people suspect that) we are proposing federalism so that the elections can be postponed. It is not true, not at all."

Later that month, Senator Panfilo Lacson said that most senators, including those who were running for reelection, would have blocked any moves by the lower house to cancel the election. This came as Alvarez switched his preferred mode of amending the constitution via a People's Initiative. Senator Franklin Drilon earlier stated that the minority bloc would have sued if Alvarez's plan of cancelling the election pushed through.

With the ouster of Alvarez by Gloria Macapagal Arroyo as speaker in July 2018, the latter said that she preferred the elections pushing through.

== Results ==
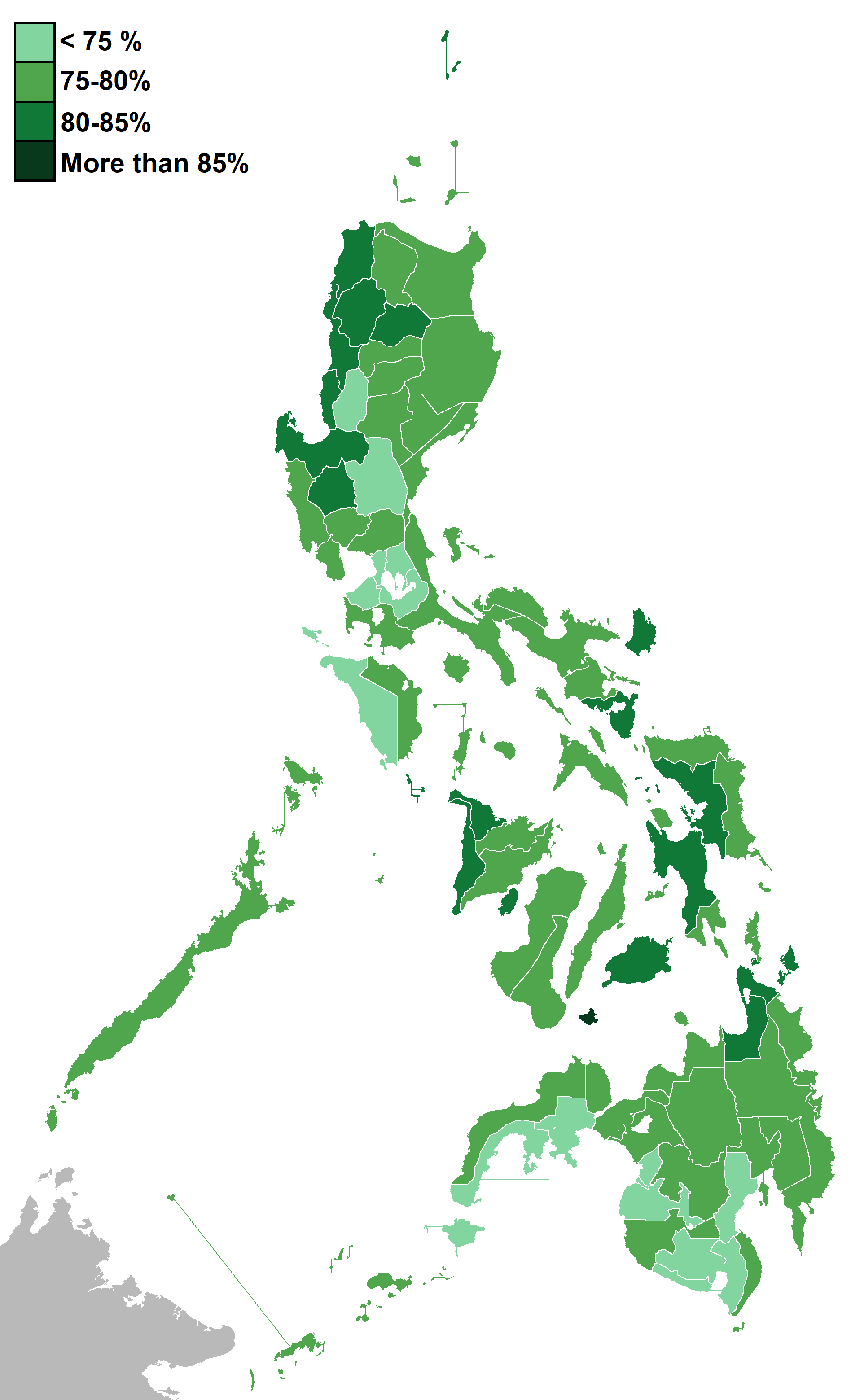
Turnout per province

=== Congress ===
The 18th Congress of the Philippines comprises the winners of this election, together with the winning candidates in the 2016 Senate election.

==== Senate ====
Twelve seats in the Senate, or those seats that were first disputed in 1995, and were last up in 2013, were up for election.

The Hugpong ng Pagbabago, the alliance backed by Davao City mayor and presidential daughter Sara Duterte won nine of the seats up. The primary opposition coalition, Otso Diretso, failed to win any seats. Candidates from neither alliance won the other three seats.

Candidate	Party or alliance		Votes	%
Cynthia Villar	Hugpong ng Pagbabago	Nacionalista Party	25,283,727	53.46
Grace Poe	Independent		22,029,788	46.58
Bong Go	Hugpong ng Pagbabago	PDP–Laban	20,657,702	43.68
Pia Cayetano	Hugpong ng Pagbabago	Nacionalista Party	19,789,019	41.84
Ronald dela Rosa	Hugpong ng Pagbabago	PDP–Laban	19,004,225	40.18
Sonny Angara	Hugpong ng Pagbabago	Laban ng Demokratikong Pilipino	18,161,862	38.40
Lito Lapid	Nationalist People's Coalition		16,965,464	35.87
Imee Marcos	Hugpong ng Pagbabago	Nacionalista Party	15,882,628	33.58
Francis Tolentino	Hugpong ng Pagbabago	PDP–Laban	15,510,026	32.79
Koko Pimentel	Hugpong ng Pagbabago	PDP–Laban	14,668,665	31.01
Bong Revilla	Hugpong ng Pagbabago	Lakas–CMD	14,624,445	30.92
Nancy Binay	United Nationalist Alliance		14,504,936	30.67
JV Ejercito	Hugpong ng Pagbabago	Nationalist People's Coalition	14,313,727	30.26
Bam Aquino	Otso Diretso	Liberal Party	14,144,923	29.91
Jinggoy Estrada	Hugpong ng Pagbabago	Pwersa ng Masang Pilipino	11,359,305	24.02
Mar Roxas	Otso Diretso	Liberal Party	9,843,288	20.81
Serge Osmeña	Independent		9,455,202	19.99
Willie Ong	Lakas–CMD		7,616,265	16.10
Dong Mangudadatu	Hugpong ng Pagbabago	PDP–Laban	7,499,604	15.86
Jiggy Manicad	Hugpong ng Pagbabago	Independent	6,896,889	14.58
Chel Diokno	Otso Diretso	Liberal Party	6,342,939	13.41
Juan Ponce Enrile	Pwersa ng Masang Pilipino		5,319,298	11.25
Gary Alejano	Otso Diretso	Liberal Party	4,726,652	9.99
Neri Colmenares	Labor Win	Makabayan	4,683,942	9.90
Samira Gutoc	Otso Diretso	Liberal Party	4,345,252	9.19
Romulo Macalintal	Otso Diretso	Independent	4,007,339	8.47
Erin Tañada	Otso Diretso	Liberal Party	3,870,529	8.18
Larry Gadon	Katipunan ng Demokratikong Pilipino	Kilusang Bagong Lipunan	3,487,780	7.37
Florin Hilbay	Otso Diretso	Aksyon Demokratiko	2,757,879	5.83
Freddie Aguilar	Independent		2,580,230	5.46
Glenn Chong	Katipunan ng Demokratikong Pilipino		2,534,335	5.36
Rafael Alunan III	Bagumbayan–VNP		2,059,359	4.35
Faisal Mangondato	Katipunan ng Kamalayang Kayumanggi	Independent	1,988,719	4.20
Agnes Escudero	Katipunan ng Kamalayang Kayumanggi	Independent	1,545,985	3.27
Diosdado Padilla	Partido Federal ng Pilipinas		1,095,337	2.32
Ernesto Arellano	Labor Win	Independent	937,713	1.98
Allan Montaño	Labor Win	Independent	923,419	1.95
Leody de Guzman	Labor Win	Partido Lakas ng Masa	893,506	1.89
Melchor Chavez	Labor Party Philippines		764,473	1.62
Vanjie Abejo	Katipunan ng Kamalayang Kayumanggi	Independent	656,006	1.39
Edmundo Casiño	Katipunan ng Demokratikong Pilipino		580,853	1.23
Abner Afuang	Labor Party Philippines		559,001	1.18
Shariff Ibrahim Albani	Labor Party Philippines		496,855	1.05
Dan Roleda	United Nationalist Alliance		469,840	0.99
Conrado Generoso	Katipunan ng Kamalayang Kayumanggi	Independent	449,785	0.95
Nur-Ana Sahidulla	Katipunan ng Demokratikong Pilipino		444,096	0.94
Abraham Jangao	Independent		434,697	0.92
Marcelino Arias	Labor Party Philippines		404,513	0.86
Richard Alfajora	Katipunan ng Kamalayang Kayumanggi	Independent	404,513	0.86
Sonny Matula	Labor Party Philippines/Labor Win		400,339	0.85
Elmer Francisco	Partido Federal ng Pilipinas		395,427	0.84
Joan Sheelah Nalliw	Katipunan ng Kamalayang Kayumanggi	Independent	390,165	0.82
Gerald Arcega	Labor Party Philippines		383,749	0.81
Butch Valdes	Katipunan ng Demokratikong Pilipino		367,851	0.78
Jesus Caceres	Katipunan ng Kamalayang Kayumanggi	Independent	358,472	0.76
Bernard Austria	Partido Demokratiko Sosyalista ng Pilipinas		347,013	0.73
Jonathan Baldevarona	Independent		310,411	0.66
Emily Mallillin	Katipunan ng Kamalayang Kayumanggi	Independent	304,215	0.64
Charlie Gaddi	Katipunan ng Kamalayang Kayumanggi	Independent	286,361	0.61
RJ Javellana	Katipunan ng Demokratikong Pilipino		258,538	0.55
Junbert Guigayuma	Labor Party Philippines		240,306	0.51
Luther Meniano	Labor Party Philippines		159,774	0.34
Total			362,179,156	100.00
Total votes			47,296,442	–
Registered voters/turnout			63,643,263	74.31
Source: COMELEC

==== House of Representatives ====
Congressional district election results

All seats in the House of Representatives were up for election.

Parties associated with the current administration, such as PDP–Laban, the Nacionalista Party, National Unity Party and Partido Federal ng Pilipinas won a majority of the seats contested. Other allies of the Duterte administration, such as the Nationalist People's Coalition, Lakas–CMD and various local parties, also won many seats. The Liberal Party won 18 seats, and is to form the nucleus of the minority bloc.

===== Congressional district elections =====
Party	Votes	%	+/–	Seats	+/–
PDP–Laban	12,653,960	31.22	+29.32	82	+79
Nacionalista Party	6,524,100	16.10	+6.68	42	+18
Nationalist People's Coalition	5,797,543	14.31	−2.73	37	−5
National Unity Party	3,852,909	9.51	−0.16	25	+2
Liberal Party	2,321,759	5.73	−35.99	18	−97
Lakas–CMD	2,069,871	5.11	+3.57	12	+8
Partido Federal ng Pilipinas	965,048	2.38	New	5	New
Hugpong ng Pagbabago	652,318	1.61	New	3	New
Aksyon Demokratiko	398,616	0.98	−0.4	1	0
Pwersa ng Masang Pilipino	396,614	0.98	+0.77	1	New
Bukidnon Paglaum	335,628	0.83	+0.48	2	+1
Pederalismo ng Dugong Dakilang Samahan	259,423	0.64	New	0	0
Laban ng Demokratikong Pilipino	252,806	0.62	+0.32	2	0
United Nationalist Alliance	232,657	0.57	−6.05	0	−11
Hugpong sa Tawong Lungsod	197,024	0.49	+0.35	1	New
Partidong Pagbabago ng Palawan	185,810	0.46	New	2	New
Bileg Ti Ilokano	158,523	0.39	New	1	New
People's Reform Party	138,014	0.34	New	1	New
Unang Sigaw	120,674	0.30	New	0	0
Katipunan ng Demokratikong Pilipino	116,453	0.29	New	0	0
Asenso Abrenio	115,865	0.29	New	1	New
KAMBILAN	107,078	0.26	New	0	0
Padayon Pilipino	98,450	0.24	−0.10	0	0
Asenso Manileño	84,656	0.21	−0.29	2	0
Kusog Bicolandia	82,832	0.20	New	0	0
Centrist Democratic Party of the Philippines	81,741	0.20	+0.16	1	New
Partido Navoteño	80,265	0.20	New	1	New
Kabalikat ng Bayan sa Kaunlaran	65,836	0.16	−0.03	1	0
Partido Demokratiko Sosyalista ng Pilipinas	56,223	0.14	New	0	0
Bagumbayan–VNP	33,731	0.08	New	0	0
Kilusang Bagong Lipunan	33,594	0.08	−0.45	0	0
Adelante Zamboanga Party	28,605	0.07	New	0	0
Labor Party Philippines	9,718	0.02	+0.00	0	0
Democratic Party of the Philippines	1,110	0.00	New	0	0
Hugpong Surigao Sur	816	0.00	New	0	0
Philippine Green Republican Party	701	0.00	−0.01	0	0
Independent	2,014,211	4.97	−0.86	2	−2
Party-list seats (Note: There were supposed to be 306 seats up, out of 245 districts and 61 party-seats. Elections at two districts were deferred after ballots were already printed using the old configuration. After the party-list seats were seated, the Supreme Court then ruled that one of the districts shall first disputed in the 2022 election, and that the results of the 2019 election using the old configuration stood. The Commission on Elections then ruled that for other district, the same ruling from the Supreme Court would also be followed. This reduced the number of congressional district seats to 243, and would have meant a reduction of one party-list seat, but that was no longer acted upon.)				61	+2
Total	40,525,182	100.00	–	304	+5
Valid votes	40,525,182	86.34	+2.37		
Invalid/blank votes	6,411,957	13.66	−2.37		
Total votes	46,937,139	100.00	–		
Registered voters/turnout	61,843,771	75.90	−5.76		
Source: COMELEC (Seats won), (Turnout and electorate)

===== Party-list election =====
Pro-administration ACT-CIS Partylist topped the party-list election, winning the maximum three seats. The leftist opposition Bayan Muna also won the maximum three seats. Other members of the Party-List Coalition won most of the other seats. Some consistent winners in past party-list elections noticeably failed to win seats, such as Akbayan, Anakpawis and Butil Farmers Party.

Party	Votes	%	+/–	Seats	+/–
ACT-CIS Partylist	2,651,987	9.51	+9.17	3	New
Bayan Muna	1,117,403	4.01	+2.14	3	+2
Ako Bicol	1,049,040	3.76	−1.38	2	−1
Citizens' Battle Against Corruption	929,718	3.33	+1.61	2	+1
Ang Probinsyano Party-list	770,344	2.76	New	2	New
1-Pacman Party List	713,969	2.56	−1.49	2	0
Marino Party List	681,448	2.44	+2.12	2	New
Probinsyano Ako	630,435	2.26	New	2	New
Senior Citizens Partylist	516,927	1.85	−1.20	1	−1
Magsasaka Partylist	496,337	1.78	New	1	New
APEC Psrtylist	480,874	1.72	New	1	New
Gabriela Women's Party	449,440	1.61	−2.61	1	−1
An Waray	442,090	1.59	−0.23	1	0
Coop-NATCCO	417,285	1.50	−0.57	1	−1
Alliance of Concerned Teachers	395,327	1.42	−2.23	1	−1
Philreca Party-list	394,966	1.42	New	1	New
Ako Bisaya	394,304	1.41	New	1	New
Tingog Sinirangan	391,211	1.40	+0.75	1	New
Abono Partylist	378,204	1.36	−0.90	1	−1
Buhay Party-List	361,493	1.30	−1.05	1	−1
Duterte Youth	354,629	1.27	New	1	New
Kalinga Partylist	339,665	1.22	New	1	0
PBA Partylist	326,258	1.17	−1.24	1	−1
ALONA Partylist	320,000	1.15	−0.19	1	0
Recobada Partylist	318,511	1.14	New	1	New
Bagong Henerasyon	288,752	1.04	+0.12	1	0
BAHAY Partylist	281,793	1.01	New	1	New
Construction Workers Solidarity	277,940	1.00	+0.97	1	New
Abang Lingkod	275,199	0.99	−0.45	1	0
A Teacher Partylist	274,460	0.98	−0.49	1	0
Barangay Health Wellness	269,518	0.97	New	1	New
SAGIP Partylist	257,313	0.92	−0.31	1	New
Trade Union Congress Party	256,059	0.92	−0.52	1	0
Magdalo para sa Pilipino	253,536	0.91	+0.05	1	0
Galing sa Puso Party	249,484	0.89	New	1	New
Manila Teachers Party-List	249,416	0.89	+0.06	1	0
Rebolusyonaryong Alyansa Makabansa	238,150	0.85	+0.38	1	New
Anakalusugan	237,629	0.85	+0.26	1	New
Ako Padayon Pilipino	235,112	0.84	New	1	New
AAMBIS-Owa Party List	234,552	0.84	−0.69	1	0
Kusug Tausug	228,224	0.82	+0.06	1	0
DUMPER Partylist	223,199	0.80	+0.78	1	New
TGP Partylist	217,525	0.78	+0.51	1	New
Patrol Partylist	216,653	0.78	New	1	New
Anak Mindanao	212,323	0.76	−1.42	1	−1
AGAP Partylist	208,752	0.75	−1.08	1	0
LPG Marketers Association	208,219	0.75	−0.69	1	0
OFW Family Club	200,881	0.72	+0.09	1	New
Kabalikat ng Mamamayan	198,571	0.71	−1.89	1	−1
Democratic Independent Workers Association	196,385	0.70	−0.74	1	New
Kabataan	195,837	0.70	−0.23	1	0
Aksyon Magsasaka-Partido Tinig ng Masa	191,804	0.69	New	0	0
Serbisyo sa Bayan Party	180,535	0.65	−0.22	0	−1
Angkla Partylist	179,909	0.65	−0.39	0	−1
Akbayan	173,356	0.62	−1.26	0	−1
Wow Pilipinas Movement	172,080	0.62	New	0	0
Ina na Nagmamahal sa Anak	170,019	0.61	New	0	0
YACAP Partylist	167,826	0.60	−0.86	0	−1
Abante Mindanao	166,883	0.60	−0.05	0	0
Butil Farmers Party	164,412	0.59	−0.63	0	−1
Append Partylist	158,003	0.57	New	0	0
Anakpawis	146,511	0.53	−0.60	0	−1
ANAC-IP Partylist	144,291	0.52	−0.46	0	−1
Ang Nars	141,263	0.51	−0.17	0	0
PBB Party List	136,093	0.49	New	0	0
Kasosyo Partylist	134,795	0.48	New	0	0
AGRI Partylist	133,505	0.48	−2.10	0	−2
Acts-OFW Partylist	131,865	0.47	−0.69	0	−1
Ating Koop	131,344	0.47	+0.10	0	0
Ang Mata'y Alagaan	128,201	0.46	−0.56	0	−1
1-CARE Partylist	127,867	0.46	New	0	−1
Murang Kuryente Partylist	127,530	0.46	New	0	0
Una ang Edukasyon	119,646	0.43	−0.43	0	−1
PEACE Partylist	119,211	0.43	New	0	0
Association of Lady Entrepreneurs	113,134	0.41	New	0	0
Aangat Tayo	109,939	0.39	−0.36	0	−1
Ako An Bisaya	109,463	0.39	−0.11	0	0
Abante Pilipinas	97,114	0.35	New	0	0
Alay Buhay Partylist	94,320	0.34	−0.24	0	0
GLOBAL Partylist	89,775	0.32	−0.04	0	0
COMSLA Partylist	88,075	0.32	−0.34	0	0
Abe Kapampangan	83,379	0.30	New	0	0
BASECORE Partylist	81,141	0.29	New	0	0
Philippine National Police Retirees Association	79,818	0.29	New	0	0
Kilusang Maypagasa	79,358	0.28	New	0	0
Juan Movement	76,769	0.28	New	0	0
Tanggol Maralita	76,428	0.27	−0.15	0	0
Aasenso Partylist	74,722	0.27	−0.64	0	−1
1AAP Party-list	74,465	0.27	New	0	0
Ang Kabuhayan	74,229	0.27	−0.81	0	−1
Agbiag! Timpuyog Ilocano	70,318	0.25	−0.49	0	−1
Abakada Guro	69,257	0.25	−0.42	0	0
Alliance of Philippine Fishing Federations	69,138	0.25	−0.43	0	0
Ang Laban ng Indiginong Filipino	68,805	0.25	−0.77	0	0
Laang Kawal ng Pilipinas	68,333	0.25	New	0	0
Sinag Tungo sa Kaunlaran	61,696	0.22	+0.03	0	0
People's Champ Guardians	60,448	0.22	New	0	0
Luntiang Pilipinas Partylist	59,096	0.21	New	0	0
GRECON Partylist	58,561	0.21	New	0	0
ANUPA Partylist	54,767	0.20	+0.14	0	0
Ako Bisdak-Bisayang Dako	51,228	0.18	New	0	0
KOOP-KAMPI	50,889	0.18	New	0	0
UNIDO Partylist	45,710	0.16	+0.01	0	0
1-Lambat Partylist	44,181	0.16	New	0	0
Ako Ayoko sa Bawal na Droga	43,583	0.16	New	0	0
Barangay Natin	40,899	0.15	+0.05	0	0
1-United Transport Koalisyon	36,285	0.13	New	0	0
AMEPA OFW Access Center	35,373	0.13	−0.24	0	0
ASEAN Partylist	32,464	0.12	−0.27	0	0
ABS Partylist	31,394	0.11	−0.82	0	−1
Sulong Dignidad Party	29,830	0.11	New	0	0
Kabalikat ng Nagkakaisang Manileño	29,187	0.10	New	0	0
Parents Teacher Alliance	28,908	0.10	New	0	0
Partido Lakas ng Masa	28,824	0.10	New	0	0
Partido ng Manggagawa	28,351	0.10	New	0	0
METRO Partylist	28,261	0.10	−0.19	0	0
1-AHAPO Partylist	26,564	0.10	−0.07	0	0
Ang Tao Muna at Bayan	25,946	0.09	+0.00	0	0
Alliance of Volunteer Educators	25,025	0.09	−0.40	0	0
AWAKE Partylist	24,780	0.09	+0.00	0	0
UTAP Bicol	22,948	0.08	New	0	0
One Philippines	21,974	0.08	New	0	0
Partido Sandugo	19,649	0.07	New	0	0
Buklod Filipino	18,297	0.07	New	0	0
FICTAP Party List	16,038	0.06	−0.05	0	0
TRICAP Partylist	15,731	0.06	−0.10	0	0
Tinderong Pinoy Party	14,580	0.05	−0.09	0	0
Pilipinas para sa Pinoy	13,848	0.05	New	0	0
Kaisahan ng mga Maliliit na Magsasaka	12,061	0.04	−0.09	0	0
Marvelous Tayo	11,751	0.04	New	0	0
Filipino Family Party	10,589	0.04	New	0	0
Alliance of Public Transport Organization	8,883	0.03	New	0	0
KAMAIS Partylist	7,571	0.03	New	0	0
SAMAKO Martylist	6,344	0.02	New	0	0
Total	27,884,790	100.00	–	61	+2
Valid votes	27,884,790	58.96	−13.02		
Invalid/blank votes	19,411,652	41.04	+13.02		
Total votes	47,296,442	100.00	–		
Registered voters/turnout	63,643,263	74.31	−6.39		
Source: COMELEC

=== Local ===
All totals as of the first quarter of 2018:

- All 81 provincial governors and vice governors, and all regular members of all of the Sangguniang Panlalawigan were up for election.
- All 145 city mayors and vice mayors, and all regular members of all of the Sangguniang Panlungsod were up for election.
- All 1,489 municipal mayors and vice mayors, and all regular members of all of the Sangguniang Bayan were up for election.

The ex officio members of the local legislatures, who have been elected after the 2018 barangay and Sangguniang Kabataan elections, shall serve until January 1, 2023, after the barangay elections in May 2020 were postponed to December 2022.

Changes are as compared to the 2016 local elections.

==== Provincial-level ====
Gubernatorial election results

Party	Governor		Vice governor		Board members		
Party	Total	+/−	Total	+/−	Boards outright controlled	Seats	+/−
PDP–Laban	41 / 81	+41	32 / 81	+30	22 / 81	263 / 1,023	+257
Nacionalista	8 / 81	−1	11 / 81	+2	7 / 81	116 / 1,023	+52
NUP	8 / 81	−1	10 / 81	+3	4 / 81	67 / 1,023	−2
NPC	7 / 81	−2	6 / 81	−4	2 / 81	90 / 1,023	−17
Liberal	2 / 81	−37	5 / 81	−34	2 / 81	54 / 1,023	−280
Lakas	2 / 81	+2	2 / 81	0	1 / 81	18 / 1,023	+14
UNA	1 / 81	−2	3 / 81	−2	0 / 81	9 / 1,023	−38
LDP	0 / 81	0	0 / 81	0	0 / 81	4 / 1,023	+4
Other parties	9 / 81	+3	11 / 81	+9	7 / 81	116 / 1,023	+49
Independent	3 / 81	−2	0 / 81	−6	—N/a	43 / 1,023	−22
Ex officio members	—N/a					243 / 1,023	0
Totals	81	0	81	0	81	1,023	+4

==== City- and municipal-level ====
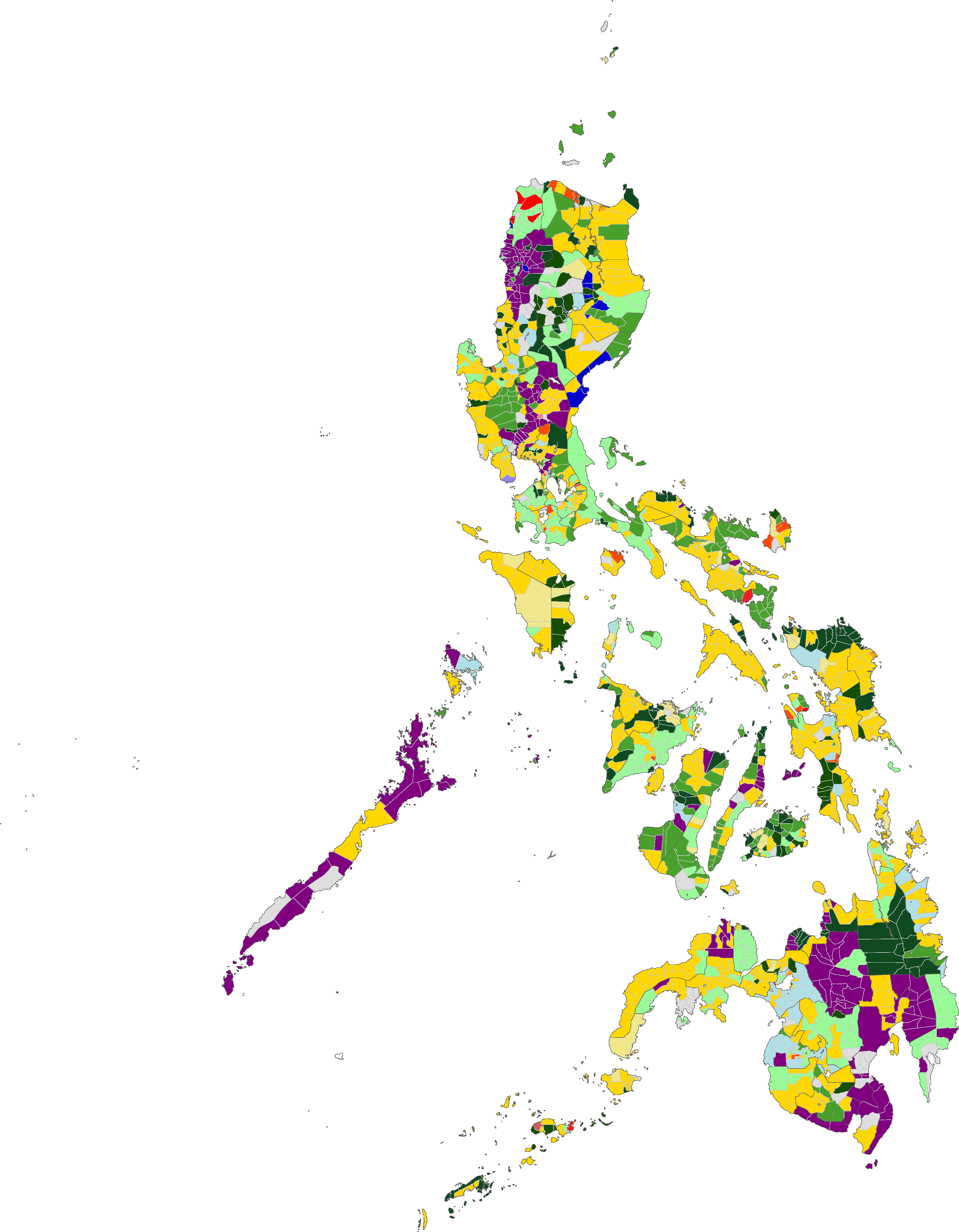
Mayoral election results

Party	Mayor		Vice mayor		Councilors	
Party	Total	+/−	Total	+/−	Seats	+/−
PDP–Laban	611 / 1,634	+41	547 / 1,634	+30	4,183 / 16,812	+257
Nacionalista	252 / 1,634	−1	244 / 1,634	+2	2,009 / 16,812	+52
NPC	172 / 1,634	−2	184 / 1,634	−4	1,413 / 16,812	−17
NUP	125 / 1,634	−1	151 / 1,634	+3	990 / 16,812	−2
Lakas	67 / 1,634	+2	66 / 1,634	0	514 / 16,812	+14
Liberal	47 / 1,634	−37	62 / 1,634	−34	385 / 16,812	−280
UNA	19 / 1,634	−2	20 / 1,634	−2	235 / 16,812	−38
LDP	11 / 1,634	0	9 / 1,634	0	91 / 16,812	+4
Aksyon	2 / 1,634	0	2 / 1,634	0	19 / 16,812	0
Other parties	259 / 1,634	+3	232 / 1,634	+9	1,971 / 16,812	+49
Independent	69 / 1,634	−2	117 / 1,634	−6	1,636 / 16,812	−22
Ex officio members	—N/a				3,268 / 16,812	0
Totals	1,634	0	1,634	0	16,812	+4

== Glitches ==
On May 13, the number of malfunctioned vote counting machines (VCMs) tripled compared to the 2016 election. According to COMELEC spokesperson James Jimenez, 400–600 out of 85,000 VCMs across the country (representing 0.7%) encountered glitches. The machines were from the 2016 elections, and the COMELEC admitted that it could be because the machines are not new.

Faulty SD cards were also reported to be the cause of malfunction. The substandard ballot forms as well as markers that bleed ink are other causes of malfunction and anomalies. The COMELEC will probe the suppliers: Triplex Enterprises Incorporated for the ballot paper and marking pens and S1 Technologies Incorporated and Silicon Valley Computer Group joint venture for the SD cards.

Jimenez, however, said that the problems experienced were still within range of expected range of expectation, as problematic machines account for only less than 1 percent of total machines used.

There are reports of running out of ballots in a polling precinct in Alburquerque, Bohol; affected voters have waited for two hours before the extra ballots was delivered at 3pm. At around 10, the COMELEC has experienced problems with the transparency server where the unofficial tally has been stuck for hours, with only 0.38% of polling precincts have managed to transmit the results. But experts agree that the glitches don't necessarily mean cheating took place. The transmission happened, according to PPCRV Chairperson Myla Villanueva. In an interview, Villanueva said that 'results were receiver by transparency server continuously, despite media temporarily not being able to see the results.' She added that 'most importantly, the ERs match with transmitted results.'

Despite the glitches, the random manual audits (RMA) conducted days after the elections show that the 2019 midterms yielded the highest rate of accuracy among the previous automated elections. Based on the 2019 RMA, the accuracy rate for the senatorial votes was at 99.9971 percent; for members of the House 99.9946 percent; and 99.9941 percent for mayor.

The COMELEC recorded at least 20 people have been killed in an election-related incidents and 43 incidents during the course of election campaign as of May 13, most notably the killing of AKO Bicol congressman Rodel Batocabe on December 22, 2018. There are reported violence during the election day: a shooting occurred at the polling center in Panglima Estino, Sulu where six have been injured.

== Reaction ==
In a Pulse Asia opinion poll dated June 24–30, 2019, 82% of those surveyed found the election to be believable while 82% said the release of the results were fast. Meanwhile, 10% of respondents found their names missing in the voters list, 4% of their registration was deactivated, 1% of the vote counting machine malfunctioned, as the issues in the election.
