= Party-list Coalition =

- President: Jose Teves Jr. (TGP Partylist)
- Chairman: Marcelino Libanan (4Ps Party-list)
- Founded: 2014
- Political position: Big tent
- House of Representatives: 61 / 318

Party-list Coalition Foundation, Inc. (PCFI), also known as the Party-list Coalition, is a coalition of representatives of political organizations with party-list representation in the House of Representatives, the lower house of the bicameral Congress of the Philippines.

The organization was founded in 2014 and is registered as a corporation with the Securities and Exchange Commission.

The Coalition is urrently aligned with the National Unity Party.

== Representation in the Congress ==
=== 17th Congress ===
Shortly prior to the start of the 17th Congress, the PCFI expressed support for then-President presumptive Rodrigo Duterte and his preferred candidate for the position of House Speaker Pantaleon Alvarez who was later elected to the position by his fellow legislators and served until 2018 when he was succeeded by Gloria Macapagal Arroyo.

It held at least 32 positions within the House of Representatives in May 2019.

=== 18th Congress ===
In May 2019, the PCFI elected Mikee Romero of 1-Pacman Partylist as its leader. The organization under Romero renewed calls for equal treatment of partylist representatives perceiving that district representatives were favored to serve in positions within the House of Representatives. Among the 61 party-list representatives from 51 organizations, 54 seats belonged to PCFI affiliated legislators. The other legislators are affiliated with the Makabayan bloc and the Magdalo Partylist.

=== 19th Congress ===
The PCFI managed to secure commitment from 60 partylist legislators for the upcoming 19th Congress. The Makabayan bloc like in the previous Congress refused to join the coalition.

== Member parties ==
As of the 18th Congress (2019–2022)

| Party | Representative | Term | Bloc |
|---|---|---|---|
| Anti-Crime and Terrorism Community Involvement and Support (ACT-CIS) | Eric Yap | 1 | Majority |
| Anti-Crime and Terrorism Community Involvement and Support (ACT-CIS) | Jocelyn Tulfo | 1 | Majority |
| Anti-Crime and Terrorism Community Involvement and Support (ACT-CIS) | Rowena Niña Taduran | 1 | Majority |
| Ako Bicol Political Party (AKO BICOL) | Alfredo Garbin Jr. | 2 | Minority |
| Ako Bicol Political Party (AKO BICOL) | Elizalde Co | 1 | Minority |
| Citizens' Battle Against Corruption (CIBAC) | Eduardo Villanueva | 1 | Majority |
| Citizens' Battle Against Corruption (CIBAC) | Domingo Rivera | 1 | Majority |
| Alyansa ng mga Mamamayang Probinsyano (ANG PROBINSYANO) | Alfred Delos Santos | 1 | Majority |
| Alyansa ng mga Mamamayang Probinsyano (ANG PROBINSYANO) | Ronnie Ong | 1 | Majority |
| One Patriotic Coalition of Marginalized Nationals (1PACMAN) | Mikee Romero | 2 | Majority |
| One Patriotic Coalition of Marginalized Nationals (1PACMAN) | Enrico Pineda | 2 | Majority |
| Marino Samahan ng mga Seaman, Inc. (MARINO) | Carlo Lisandro Gonzalez | 1 | Majority |
| Marino Samahan ng mga Seaman, Inc. (MARINO) | Jose Antonio Lopez^{1} | 1 | Majority |
| Marino Samahan ng mga Seaman, Inc. (MARINO) | Macnell Lusotan^{2} | 1 | Majority |
| Probinsyano Ako | Rudys Caesar Fariñas I | 1 | Majority |
| Probinsyano Ako | Lira Fuster-Fariñas | 1 | Majority |
| Coalition of Associations of Senior Citizens in the Philippines (SENIOR CITIZENS) | Francisco Datol Jr. | 2 | Majority |
| Magkakasama Sa Sakahan, Kaunlaran (MAGSASAKA) | Argel Joseph Cabatbat | 1 | Minority |
| Association of Philippine Electric Cooperatives (APEC) | Sergio Dagooc | 1 | Minority |
| An Waray | Florencio Gabriel Noel | 1 | Majority |
| Cooperative Natcco Network (COOP-NATCCO) | Sabiniano Canama | 2 | Majority |
| Philippine Rural Electronic Cooperatives Association, Inc. (PHILRECA) | Presley De Jesus | 1 | Majority |
| Ako Bisaya | Sonny Lagon | 1 | Majority |
| Tingog Sinirangan | Yedda Marie Romualdez | 2 | Majority |
| Abono | Conrado Estrella III | 3 | Majority |
| Buhay Hayaan Yumabong (BUHAY) | Jose Atienza Jr. | 3 | Independent Minority |
| Duterte Youth | Ducielle Cardema^{3} | 1 | Majority |
| Kalinga-Advocacy for Social Empowerment and Nation-Building Through Easing Poverty, Inc. (KALINGA) | Irene Gay Saulog | 1 | Minority |
| Puwersa ng Bayaning Atleta (PBA) | Jericho Jonas Nograles | 2 | Majority |
| Alliance of Organizations, Networks and Associations of the Philippines (ALONA) | Eleanor Florido | 1 | Majority |
| Rural Electronic Consumers and Beneficiaries of Development and Advancement, Inc (RECOBODA) | Godofredo Guya | 1 | Minority |
| Bagong Henerasyon (BH) | Bernadette Herrera-Dy | 2 | Majority |
| Bahay Para sa Pamilyang Pilipino, Inc. (BAHAY) | Naealla Rose Bainto-Aguinaldo | 1 | Majority |
| Construction Workers' Solidarity (CWS) | Romeo Momo Sr. | 1 | Majority |
| Abang Lingkod | Joseph Stephen Paduano | 3 | Minority |
| Advocacy for Teacher Empowerment through Action, Cooperation and Harmony towards Educational Reforms, Inc. (A TEACHER) | Mariano Piamonte Jr. | 1 | Minority |
| Barangay Health Wellness (BHW) | Angelica Natasha Co | 1 | Minority |
| Social Amelioration and Genuine Intervention on Poverty (SAGIP) | Rodante Marcoleta | 2 | Majority |
| Trade Union Congress Party (TUCP) | Raymond Democrito Mendoza | | Majority |
| Galing sa Puso Party (GP) | Jose Gay Padiernos | 1 | Majority |
| Manila Teachers' Savings and Loan Association (MANILA TEACHERS) | Virgilio Lacson | 2 | Majority |
| Rebolusyonaryong Alyansang Makabansa (RAM) | Aloysia Lim | 1 | Majority |
| Alagaan Natin Ating Kalusugan (ANAKALUSUGAN) | Mike Defensor | 1 | Independent Majority |
| Ako Padayon Pilipino (AKO PADAYON) | Adriano Ebcas | 1 | Majority |
| Ang Asosasyon Sang Mangunguma Nga Bisaya Owa Mangunguma (AAMBIS-OWA) | Sharon Garin | | Majority |
| Kusug Tausug | Shernee Tan | | Majority |
| Dumper Philippines Taxi Drivers Association, Inc (Dumper-PTDA) | Claudine Diana Bautista | 1 | Majority |
| Talino at Galing ng Pinoy (TGP) | Jose Teves Jr. | 1 | Majority |
| Public Safety Alliance for Transformation and Rule of Law, Inc (PATROL) | Jorge Antonio Bustos | 1 | Majority |
| Anak Mindanao (AMIN) | Amihilda Sangcopan | 2 | Majority |
| Agricultural Sector Alliance of the Philippines (AGAP) | Rico Geron | 3 | Majority |
| LPG Marketers Association, Inc (LPGMA) | Rodolfo Albano Jr. | 1 | Majority |
| OFW Family Club, Inc. (OFWFC) | Alberto Pacquiao | 1 | Majority |
| Kabalikat ng Mamamayan (KABAYAN) | Ron Salo | 2 | Majority |
| Democratic Independent Workers Association (DIWA) | Michael Edgar Aglipay | 1 | Majority |

^1 Resigned on July 25, 2019.
^2 Took office on November 4, 2019.
^3 Took office on October 13, 2020.
