= 2025 Philippine House of Representatives elections in the Cordillera Administrative Region =

- May 12, 2025
- All 7 Cordillera Administrative Region seats in the House of Representatives
Party	Seats	+/–
Lakas	2	+2
NPC	2	+1
PFP	1	New
Nacionalista	1	−3
Independent	1	+1
This lists parties that won seats. See the complete results below.

The 2025 Philippine House of Representatives elections in the Cordillera Administrative Region were held on May 12, 2025, as part of the 2025 Philippine general election.

== Summary ==
Congressional district	Incumbent	Incumbent's party	Winner	Winner's party	Winning margin
Abra	Ching Bernos	Lakas	Joseph Bernos	Lakas	70.98%
Apayao	Eleanor Begtang	NPC	Eleanor Begtang	NPC	Unopposed
Baguio	Mark Go	Nacionalista	Mauricio Domogan	Independent	10.19%
Benguet	Eric Yap	Lakas	Eric Yap	Lakas	39.38%
Ifugao	Solomon Chungalao	NPC	Solomon Chungalao	NPC	9.83%
Kalinga	Allen Jesse Mangaoang	Nacionalista	Caroline Agyao	PFP	15.09%
Mountain Province	Maximo Dalog Jr.	Nacionalista	Maximo Dalog Jr.	Nacionalista	Unopposed

== Abra ==
Incumbent Ching Bernos of the Nationalist People's Coalition ran for a second term as a nominee of the Solid North party-list. She was previously affiliated with the Nacionalista Party.

Bernos endorsed her husband, La Paz mayor Joseph Bernos (Lakas–CMD), who won the election against Bangued mayor Mila Valera (Asenso Abrenio) and Deydey Ifurung (Aksyon Demokratiko).

On April 23, 2025, Joseph Bernos was accused of threatening a journalist from DZRH who reported on a shooting incident between local candidates in the province.

Candidate	Party	Votes	%
Joseph Bernos	Lakas–CMD	140,446	85.10
Mila Valera	Asenso Abrenio	23,308	14.12
Deydey Ifurung	Aksyon Demokratiko	1,285	0.78
Total		165,039	100.00
Valid votes		165,039	95.42
Invalid/blank votes		7,920	4.58
Total votes		172,959	100.00
Registered voters/turnout		188,957	91.53
Lakas gain from NPC			
Source: Commission on Elections

== Apayao ==
Incumbent Eleanor Begtang of the Nationalist People's Coalition won re-election for a second term unopposed. She was previously affiliated with PDP–Laban.

Candidate	Party	Votes	%
Eleanor Begtang (incumbent)	Nationalist People's Coalition	58,041	100.00
Total		58,041	100.00
Valid votes		58,041	80.00
Invalid/blank votes		14,507	20.00
Total votes		72,548	100.00
Registered voters/turnout		83,441	86.95
NPC hold			
Source: Commission on Elections

== Baguio ==
Term-limited incumbent Mark Go of the Nacionalista Party ran for mayor of Baguio.

Go endorsed his wife, Sol Go of Lakas–CMD, who was defeated by former Baguio mayor Mauricio Domogan, an independent. City councilor Isabelo Cosalan Jr. (Partido Federal ng Pilipinas), former representative Nicasio Aliping Jr. (Independent), former Baguio vice mayor Gladys Vergara (Nationalist People's Coalition) and two other candidates also ran for representative.

Candidate	Party	Votes	%
Mauricio Domogan	Independent	45,767	35.68
Isabelo Cosalan Jr.	Partido Federal ng Pilipinas	32,690	25.49
Sol Go	Lakas–CMD	20,149	15.71
Nicasio Aliping Jr.	Independent	17,551	13.68
Gladys Vergara	Nationalist People's Coalition	10,624	8.28
Francis Rae Camtugan II	Independent	1,258	0.98
Win-win Demoni	Independent	228	0.18
Total		128,267	100.00
Valid votes		128,267	97.07
Invalid/blank votes		3,874	2.93
Total votes		132,141	100.00
Registered voters/turnout		166,416	79.40
Independent gain from Nacionalista			
Source: Commission on Elections

== Benguet ==
Incumbent Eric Yap of Lakas–CMD ran for a third term. He was previously affiliated with the United Benguet Party.

Yap won re-election against Benguet vice governor Tagel Felipe (Partido Federal ng Pilipinas) and two other candidates. However, Yap's proclamation was suspended due to a disqualification complaint.

On June 26, 2025, the Commission on Elections' Second Division approved Yap's proclamation as the elected representative. Yap was proclaimed as the elected representative on July 2.

Candidate	Party	Votes	%
Eric Yap (incumbent)	Lakas–CMD	144,093	69.43
Tagel Felipe	Partido Federal ng Pilipinas	62,371	30.05
Jerome Wakat	Independent	765	0.37
Juanito Siddayao II	Independent	312	0.15
Total		207,541	100.00
Valid votes		207,541	98.39
Invalid/blank votes		3,386	1.61
Total votes		210,927	100.00
Registered voters/turnout		249,729	84.46
Lakas hold			
Source: Commission on Elections

== Ifugao ==
Incumbent Solomon Chungalao of the Nationalist People's Coalition ran for a third term.

Chungalao won re-election against three other candidates.

Candidate	Party	Votes	%
Solomon Chungalao (incumbent)	Nationalist People's Coalition	63,771	54.70
Francis Cuyop	Partido Federal ng Pilipinas	52,314	44.87
Nelson Ayoc	Independent	355	0.30
Boyd Ngipol	PDP–Laban	145	0.12
Total		116,585	100.00
Valid votes		116,585	98.94
Invalid/blank votes		1,250	1.06
Total votes		117,835	100.00
Registered voters/turnout		136,318	86.44
NPC hold			
Source: Commission on Elections

== Kalinga ==
Incumbent Allen Jesse Mangaoang of the Nacionalista Party was term-limited.

Mangaoang endorsed his wife, Caroline Agyao (Partido Federal ng Pilipinas), who won the election against Steve Ludan (Nationalist People's Coalition) and Tinglayan mayor Sacrament Gumilab (Independent).

Candidate	Party	Votes	%
Caroline Agyao	Partido Federal ng Pilipinas	60,419	43.98
Steve Ludan	Nationalist People's Coalition	39,688	28.89
Sacrament Gumilab	Independent	37,286	27.14
Total		137,393	100.00
Valid votes		137,393	97.75
Invalid/blank votes		3,161	2.25
Total votes		140,554	100.00
Registered voters/turnout		158,555	88.65
Source: Commission on Elections

== Mountain Province ==
Incumbent Maximo Dalog Jr. (Nacionalista Party) won re-election for a third term unopposed.

Allen Ocden (Independent) initially ran against Dalog, but withdrew on October 28, 2024.

Candidate	Party	Votes	%
Maximo Dalog Jr. (Incumbent)	Nacionalista Party	85,006	100.00
Total		85,006	100.00
Valid votes		85,006	85.55
Invalid/blank votes		14,357	14.45
Total votes		99,363	100.00
Registered voters/turnout		121,647	81.68
Nacionalista hold			
Source: Commission on Elections
