= 2025 Philippine House of Representatives elections =

27th Philippine House of Representatives elections

- May 12, 2025
- All 318 seats to the House of Representatives of the Philippines; 160 seats needed for a majority
- Congressional district elections
- All 254 seats from congressional districts
Party	Vote %	Seats	+/–
Lakas	32.87	103	+77
NUP	12.05	32	−1
NPC	11.83	31	−4
PFP	10.47	27	+25
Nacionalista	9.36	22	−14
Liberal	3.08	6	−4
Aksyon	2.66	2	+2
PDP–Laban	1.32	2	−64
LDP	0.62	2	+1
PRP	0.58	1	−2
PMP	0.53	2	+2
UNA	0.28	1	0
CDP	0.25	1	0
Others	14.08	22	−12
This lists parties that won seats. See the complete results below.
- Party-list election
- All 64 seats under the party-list system
Party	Vote %	Seats	+/–
Akbayan	7.02	3	+2
Tingog	4.60	3	+1
4Ps	3.71	2	0
ACT-CIS	3.13	2	−1
Ako Bicol	2.71	2	0
Others	78.83	47	−6
This lists parties that won seats. See the complete results below.
Election results; map refers to results from congressional districts, with Metro Manila, parts of Metro Cebu and Metro Davao at the inset, while the boxes to the lower left represent party-list seats.
Speaker before	Speaker after
Martin Romualdez; Lakas	Martin Romualdez; Lakas

The 2025 Philippine House of Representatives elections were the 37th lower house elections in the Philippines, and 27th as House of Representatives. It was held on May 12, 2025, within the 2025 Philippine general election. All 318 seats in the House of Representatives were contested in this election, including one seat for each of the 254 congressional districts in the country and 64 seats representing party-lists apportioned on a nationwide vote.

Lakas–CMD remained the most dominant party in the House of Representatives, with its candidates securing 103 seats for the 20th Congress, adding they would continue to support the presidential administration of Marcos. Akbayan topped the party-list vote with 2.7 million votes, and won the maximum three seats allowable under the law.

Martin Romualdez of Lakas defended the speakership, facing no opponents, and being elected overwhelmingly.

== Background ==
In the 2022 election, parties aligned with the UniTeam alliance and eventual president Bongbong Marcos secured a supermajority of seats in the House of Representatives of the Philippines. Political observers noted that among those elected to the chamber, most came from "wealthy and influential families", which was associated with the vote-buying incidents observed in the election.

Upon the opening of the 19th Congress of the Philippines, Representative Martin Romualdez of Leyte's 1st district, a cousin of President Marcos, was elected as the speaker of the House of Representatives unopposed. Media outlets have noted that a number of positions in the house leadership were assigned to representatives related to the Marcos family, including senior deputy majority leader Sandro Marcos, the son of President Marcos, and chair of the accounts committee Yedda Marie Romualdez, the wife of Speaker Romualdez.

The 19th Congress saw considerable political realignment, with House representatives abandoning the former ruling party PDP–Laban for Lakas–CMD of Romualdez and Partido Federal ng Pilipinas of Marcos.

== Electoral system ==
The Philippines uses parallel voting for its lower house elections. For this election, there are 317 seats in the House of Representatives; 254 of these are district representatives, and 63 are party-list representatives.

The 1987 constitution mandates that there should be one party-list representative for every four district representatives. District representatives are elected under the first-past-the-post system from single-member districts. Congress has the power of creating congressional districts. The constitution originally had 200 districts, but had increased in number since then to the current 254 that will be disputed in this election.

Party-list representatives are elected via the nationwide vote with a 2% election threshold, with a party winning not more than three seats. The party with the most votes usually wins three seats, then the other parties with more than 2% of the vote two seats. At this point, if all of the party-list seats are not filled up, the parties with less than 2% of the vote will win one seat each until all party-list seats are filled up. The electoral system, with the 2% threshold and the three-seat cap, encourage vote splitting; and encourage sectors to up separate party-lists for every sector so as not to waste their vote on just one party.

Political parties competing in the party-list election are barred from participating district elections, and vice versa, unless permitted by the Commission on Elections. Party-lists and political parties participating in the district elections may forge coalition deals with one another.

== Redistricting ==
In the Philippines, Congress has the power to create new congressional districts. Congress can either redistrict the entire country within three years after each Philippine census, or create new districts from existing ones piecemeal, although Congress has never redistricted the entire country wholesale since the approval of the 1987 constitution. Congress usually creates a new district once a place reaches the minimum 250,000 population mandated by the constitution.

New districts can also be created by creating new provinces and cities; in this case, it also must be approved by the people in a plebiscite in the affected places.

=== Changes from the previous Congress ===
These are the districts, not contested in 2022, created by the 18th Congress that were either signed by then-President Rodrigo Duterte or had lapsed into law:

- Division of Maguindanao to Maguindanao del Norte and Maguindanao del Sur
  - Maguindanao's 1st congressional district and Talitay (formerly Sultan Sumagka, part of the 2nd district) becomes the at-large district of the newly created province of Maguindanao del Norte.
  - The rest of the municipalities included in Maguindanao's 2nd congressional district becomes the at-large district of the newly created province of Maguindanao del Sur.
  - Enacted as Republic Act No. 11550
  - Approved in a plebiscite on September 17, 2022
- Reapportionment of Agusan del Norte's 1st and 2nd districts
  - Agusan del Norte's 2nd district and Las Nieves (part of the 1st district) becomes Agusan del Norte's at-large district.
  - Butuan (part of the 1st district) becomes its own at-large district
  - Enacted as Republic Act No. 11714.
- Division of South Cotabato's 2nd district to 2 districts
  - Koronadal and its bordering municipalities shall remain as South Cotabato's 2nd district, while the westernmost municipalities shall become the third district.
  - General Santos, the old 3rd district, becomes its own at-large district
  - Enacted as Republic Act No. 11804.

=== Changes from the outgoing Congress ===
- No redistricting laws were passed by the 19th Congress.

=== Other changes made ===
A Supreme Court decision regarding the Makati–Taguig boundary dispute, and the creation of new municipalities from the Special Geographic Area of the Bangsamoro caused changes in congressional apportionment.

- Reapportionment of Taguig/Pateros's 1st and 2nd districts, and Makati's 2nd district
  - The three barangays remaining in Makati's jurisdiction after the Supreme Court awarded Taguig the 10 EMBO barangays after winning the Fort Bonifacio boundary dispute shall be retained as Makati's 2nd district.
  - The EMBO barangays now under the jurisdiction of Taguig were originally not allocated to any congressional district by the COMELEC.
  - The COMELEC later adopted a resolution by the Taguig City Council reapportioning the EMBO barangays to its 2 districts with Pateros, with the barangays solely bordering Pateros (Comembo, Pembo and Rizal) going to the 1st district, while the other seven barangays going to the 2nd district.
- Reapportionment of Cotabato's 1st and 3rd districts
  - The Special Geographic Area that is still formally within Cotabato has been removed by the COMELEC from its congressional representation after the approval of incorporation of 8 new municipalities in plebiscites held in 2024. Because of this, the Bangsamoro asked Congress to create a new province out of the 8 new municipalities.

=== Summary of changes ===
On June 21, 2024, the Commission on Elections (COMELEC) confirmed that there will be 254 congressional districts to be contested in the election and 63 seats apportioned among the party-lists.

Category	Total
Congressional districts in the current Congress	253
New districts from redistricting laws from previous Congress	1
Congressional districts in the next Congress	254
Party-list seats for the next Congress	63
Total seats for the next Congress	317

== Participating parties ==
In both chambers of Congress, members are organized into "blocs", akin to parliamentary groups elsewhere. In keeping with the traditions of the Third Philippine Republic which was under a two-party system, there are two main blocs, the majority and minority blocs; this is although the country is now in a multi-party system. Those who voted for the winning speaker are from the majority bloc, while those who did not (if there are more than two candidates for the speakership) will vote amongst themselves on who will be the minority bloc. Those who belong to neither bloc shall be the independent minority bloc. Members can also be from the independent bloc. Each bloc can have members from multiple parties. Only the majority and minority blocs have voting privileges in committees.

In the 19th Congress, the majority bloc is aligned with the administration of President Marcos.

=== In congressional districts ===
Parties in the House of Representatives at the end of the 19th Congress of the Philippines
Party	2022 results		Seats before the election		Bloc membership		Political affiliation	
Party	Votes	Seat(s) won	Seats	Change	Majority	Minority	2022	2025
Lakas	9.39%	26 / 316	111 / 316	▲85	All	None	UniTeam	Alyansa
NUP	12.63%	33 / 316	40 / 316	▲7	Most	Some	n/a	Alyansa
Nacionalista	13.72%	36 / 316	28 / 316	▼8	Most	Some	n/a	Alyansa
NPC	11.70%	35 / 316	39 / 316	▲4	All	None	Reporma–NPC	Alyansa
PFP	0.95%	2 / 316	12 / 316	▲10	All	None	UniTeam	Alyansa
Liberal	3.78%	10 / 316	5 / 316	▼5	Most	Some	TRoPa	KiBam
Others	32.08%	76 / 316	4 / 316	▼72	Most	Some	—N/a	
Local parties	11.31%	29 / 316	5 / 316	▼24	Most	Some	—N/a	
Independent	4.44%	6 / 316	1 / 316	▼5	All	None	—N/a	
Vacant	—N/a		8 / 316	▲8	—N/a			
Total	100%	253 / 316	253 / 316					

==== Complete list ====
These parties put up candidates at least in one congressional district.

National parties:

- Akay National Political Party (Akay)
- Aksyon Demokratiko (Aksyon)
- Centrist Democratic Party of the Philippines (CDP)
- Katipunan ng Nagkakaisang Pilipino (KANP)
- Laban ng Demokratikong Pilipino (LDP)
- Lakas–CMD (Lakas)
- Liberal Party (LP)
- Makabayan
- Nacionalista Party (NP)
- National Unity Party (NUP)
- Nationalist People's Coalition (NPC)
- Partido Demokratiko Pilipino (PDP)
- Partido Demokratiko Sosyalista ng Pilipinas (PDSP)
- Partido Federal ng Pilipinas (PFP)
- Partido Lakas ng Masa (PLM)
- Partido para sa Demokratikong Reporma (Reporma)
- People's Reform Party (PRP)
- Pwersa ng Masang Pilipino (PMP)
- Reform PH Party (Reform PH)
- United Nationalist Alliance (UNA)
- Workers' and Peasants' Party (WPP)

Local parties:

- Adelante Zamboanga Party (AZAP)
- Asenso Abrenio
- Asenso Manileño
- Filipino Rights Protection Advocates of Manila Movement (FRPAMM)
- Galing at Serbisyo para sa Mindoreño (GSP)
- Hugpong sa Tawong Lungsod (HTL)
- Kusog Bicolandia (Kusog)
- Makatizens United Party (MKTZNU)
- One Capiz (1CAPIZ)
- One Cebu (1CEBU) (Note: Running in coalition with the Nationalist People's Coalition)
- Padajon Surigao Party (PSS)
- Partido Navoteño (Navoteño)
- Sama-Sama Tarlac (SST)
- Unang Sigaw (Sigaw)
- United Bangsamoro Justice Party (UBJP)
- United Negros Alliance (UNEGA) (Note: Running in coalition with the National Unity Party)

=== In party lists ===
Party lists in the House of Representatives at the end of the 19th Congress of the Philippines
Party list	Seats before the election	Bloc membership	
Party list	Seats before the election	Majority	Minority
Party-list	58 / 316	Most	Some
Makabayan	3 / 316	None	All
Vacant	2 / 316	—	
Total	63 / 316		

==== Complete list ====
These are the party-lists that were approved by the COMELEC to appear on the ballot, ordered by ballot number.

1. 4Ps
2. PPP
3. FPJ Panday Bayanihan
4. Kabataan (Note: Sectoral wing of Makabayan)
5. Duterte Youth
6. ML (Note: Sectoral wing of the Liberal Party)
7. PBBM
8. P3PWD
9. Murang Kuryente
10. Bicol Saro
11. Ipatupad
12. PATROL
13. Juan PINOY
14. ARTE
15. WIFI
16. MAAGAP
17. United Senior Citizens
18. Epanaw Sambayanan
19. Ako Padayon
20. TUCP
21. ACT Teachers
22. 1PACMAN
23. TGP
24. DUMPER PTDA
25. Anakalusugan
26. Aksyon Dapat (Note: Sectoral wing of Aksyon Demokratiko)
27. BHW
28. Sulong Dignidad
29. Batang Quiapo
30. PBA
31. GILAS
32. Ako Ilokano Ako
33. Pamilyang Magsasaka
34. Click Party
35. Abante Bisdak
36. Manila Teachers
37. PAMANA
38. Nanay
39. KM Ngayon Na
40. Babae Ako
41. ARISE
42. Magdalo
43. APEC
44. MAGBUBUKID
45. SSS-GSIS Pensyonado
46. GABRIELA
47. Tingog
48. APAT-DAPAT
49. Ahon Mahirap
50. UGB
51. Akbayan
52. Agimat
53. PHILRECA
54. Kapuso PM
55. Ilocano Defenders
56. 1-Rider Party-list
57. TICTOK
58. (skipped (Note: Wage Hike withdrew on December 12, 2024 and its ballot number 58 was skipped.))
59. Bayan Muna
60. Ang Probinsyano
61. BANAT
62. SBP
63. Buhay
64. Tulungan Tayo
65. SAGIP
66. BTS Bayaning Tsuper
67. Vendors
68. ACT-CIS
69. Aktibong Kaagapay
70. Asenso Pinoy
71. Solo Parents
72. Ang Komadrona
73. PROMDI
74. Pusong Pinoy
75. Kusug Tausug
76. Damayang Filipino
77. MPBL
78. ANGAT
79. Kalinga
80. Boses Party-list
81. Arangkada Pilipino
82. Aangat Tayo
83. OFW
84. BIDA KATAGUMPAY
85. KAMANGGAGAWA
86. BFF
87. Bunyog
88. AGRI
89. Senior Citizens
90. 4K
91. PBP
92. One Coop
93. CIBAC
94. BH - Bagong Henerasyon
95. 1AGILA
96. EDUAKSYON
97. Ang Tinig ng Seniors
98. BG Party-list
99. Pinoy Ako
100. H.E.L.P. PILIPINAS
101. Health Workers
102. People's Champ
103. AA-Kasosyo Party
104. Solid North Party
105. ABAMIN
106. TRABAHO
107. ANGKASangga
108. TODA Aksyon
109. Turismo
110. Abono
111. ASAP NA
112. LINGAP
113. United Frontliners
114. Kasambahay
115. Tutok To WIn
116. Ako OFW
117. AGAP
118. 1TAHANAN
119. Coop-NATCCO
120. KABAYAN
121. 1Munti
122. PINOY WORKERS
123. API Party
124. Ako Bisaya
125. KAMALAYAN
126. Ako Tanod
127. Probinsyano Ako
128. KABABAIHAN
129. RAM
130. ALONA
131. Ako Bikol
132. GP (Galing sa Puso)
133. KAUNLAD PINOY
134. ABP
135. CWS
136. LPGMA
137. A TEACHER
138. SWERTE
139. Gabay
140. Malasakit@Bayanihan
141. Akay ni Sol (Note: Sectoral wing of Akay National Political Party)
142. LUNAS
143. DIWA
144. PINUNO
145. Pamilya Muna
146. Bagong Pilipinas
147. Hugpong Federal
148. Tupad
149. Lang Kawal
150. Pamilya Ko
151. BBM
152. Heal PH
153. Abang Lingkod
154. MAGSASAKA
155. Maharlika
156. Uswag Ilonggo

== Retiring and term-limited incumbents ==
Each representative is limited to three full consecutive terms in office, with voluntary renunciation of the office for any length of time shall not be considered as an interruption in the continuity of his service for the full term for which he was elected.

=== Term-limited ===
A total of 51 representatives have been elected three consecutive times in regular elections and are barred from seeking another congressional term in 2025.

Party	Member	District	Position running in 2025
1-Pacman	Mikee Romero	Party-list	Not running
ACT Teachers	France Castro	Party-list	Senator; lost
ALONA	Anna Villaraza-Suarez	Party-list	Not running
BH	Bernadette Herrera	Party-list	Not running
Gabriela	Arlene Brosas	Party-list	Senator; lost
Kusug Tausug	Shernee Tan-Tambut	Party-list	Vice mayor of Maimbung; won
Lakas	Marlyn Alonte-Naguiat	Biñan at-large	Not running
Lakas	Manuel Jose Dalipe	Zamboanga City–2nd	Mayor of Zamboanga City; lost
Lakas	Christopher de Venecia	Pangasinan–4th	Not running
Lakas	Mohamad Khalid Dimaporo	Lanao del Norte–1st	Governor of Lanao del Norte; won
Lakas	Glona Labadlabad	Zamboanga del Norte–2nd	Mayor of Sindangan, Zamboanga del Norte; won
Lakas	Carmelo Lazatin II	Pampanga–1st	Mayor of Angeles City; won
Lakas	Aurelio Gonzales Jr.	Pampanga–3rd	Not running
Lakas	Francisco Jose Matugas II	Surigao del Norte–1st	Governor of Surigao del Norte lost
Lakas	Geraldine Roman	Bataan–1st	Not running
Lakas	Joey Salceda	Albay–2nd	Governor of Albay; lost
Lakas	Raul Tupas	Iloilo–5th	Vice governor of Iloilo; lost
Lakas	Divina Grace Yu	Zamboanga del Sur–1st	Governor of Zamboanga del Sur; won
Liberal	Emmanuel Billones	Capiz–1st	Not running
Liberal	Gabriel Bordado	Camarines Sur–3rd	Vice mayor of Naga; won
Manila Teachers	Virgilio Lacson	Party-list	Not running
Nacionalista	Ace Barbers	Surigao del Norte–2nd	Not running
Nacionalista	Lianda Bolilia	Batangas–4th	Not running
Nacionalista	Marquez Go	Baguio at-large	Mayor of Baguio; lost
Nacionalista	Allen Jesse Mangaoang	Kalinga at-large	Not running
Nacionalista	Mario Vittorio Mariño	Batangas–5th	Mayor of Batangas City; won
NPC	Peter John Calderon	Cebu–7th	Not running
NPC	Luis Campos Jr.	Makati–2nd	Mayor of Makati; lost
NPC	Maria Theresa Collantes	Batangas–3rd	Not running
NPC	Michael John Duavit	Rizal–1st	Not running
NPC	Greg Gasataya	Bacolod at-large	Mayor of Bacolod; won
NPC	Edward Maceda	Manila–4th	Not running
NPC	Carlito Marquez	Aklan–1st	Not running
NPC	Chiquiting Sagarbarria	Negros Oriental–2nd	Mayor of Dumaguete; won
NPC	Jocelyn Sy-Limkaichong	Negros Oriental–1st	Mayor of Guihulngan
NPC	Lord Allan Velasco	Marinduque at-large	Governor of Marinduque; lost
NUP	Yoyette Ferrer	Negros Occidental–4th district	Not running
NUP	Neptali Gonzales II	Mandaluyong at-large	Not running
NUP	Lucille Nava	Guimaras at-large	Governor of Guimaras; won
NUP	Johnny Pimentel	Surigao del Sur–2nd	Governor of Surigao del Sur; won
NUP	Roberto Puno	Antipolo–1st	Not running
NUP	Lorna Silverio	Bulacan–3rd	Not running
NUP	Horacio Suansing Jr.	Sultan Kudarat–2nd	Not running
NUP	Luis Raymund Villafuerte	Camarines Sur–2nd	Governor of Camarines Sur; won
PFP	Ruwel Peter Gonzaga	Davao de Oro–2nd	Governor of Davao de Oro; lost
PFP	Florida Robes	San Jose del Monte at-large	Mayor of San Jose del Monte; won
PFP	Rosanna Vergara	Nueva Ecija–3rd	Not running
Reporma	Pantaleon Alvarez	Davao del Norte–1st	Vice governor of Davao del Norte; lost
SAGIP	Rodante Marcoleta	Party-list	Senator; won
UNA	Luisa Cuaresma	Nueva Vizcaya	Governor of Nueva Vizcaya; lost
Independent	Eric Martinez	Valenzuela–2nd	Senator; lost

=== Retiring members ===
The following members of Congress are eligible for another term, but have chosen to retire or seek other positions.

Party	Member	District	Position running in 2025
1-Rider	Bonifacio Bosita	Party-list	Senator; lost
ACT-CIS	Erwin Tulfo	Party-list	Senator; won
Agri	Wilbert T. Lee	Party-list	Senator; withdrew
BUP	Mujiv Hataman	Basilan–at-large	Governor of Basilan; won
Lakas	Ma. Cynthia Chan	Lapu-Lapu City at-large	Mayor of Lapu-Lapu City; won
Lakas	Ambrosio Cruz Jr.	Bulacan–5th	Mayor of Guiguinto; won
Lakas	Alan Dujali	Davao del Norte–2nd	Governor of Davao del Norte; lost
Lakas	Inno Dy	Isabela–6th	Mayor of Echague, won
Lakas	Vincent Garcia	Davao City–2nd	Not running
Lakas	Ara Kho	Masbate–2nd	Mayor of Masbate City; won
Lakas	Richard Kho	Masbate–1st	Governor of Masbate; won
Lakas	Ruth Mariano-Hernandez	Laguna–2nd	Governor of Laguna; lost
Lakas	Luz Mercado	Southern Leyte–1st	Not running
Lakas	Ramon Nolasco Jr.	Cagayan–1st	Not running
Lakas	Edwin Olivarez	Parañaque–1st	Mayor of Parañaque; won
Lakas	Stella Quimbo	Marikina–2nd	Mayor of Marikina; lost
Lakas	Bai Rihan Sakaluran	Sultan Kudarat–1st	Mayor of Isulan; won
Liberal	Kid Peña	Makati–1st	Vice mayor of Makati; won
Nacionalista	Nelson Dayanghirang	Davao Oriental–1st	Governor of Davao Oriental; won
Nacionalista	Michael Gorriceta	Iloilo–2nd	Not running
Nacionalista	Khymer Adan Olaso	Zamboanga City–1st	Mayor of Zamboanga City; won
Nacionalista	Camille Villar	Las Piñas at-large	Senator; won
NPC	Josephine Lacson-Noel	Malabon at-large	Mayor of Malabon; lost
NPC	Gerardo Valmayor Jr.	Negros Occidental–1st	Not running
NPC	Christian T. Yap	Tarlac–2nd	Governor of Tarlac; won
NUP	Paul Daza	Northern Samar–1st	Not running
NUP	Danilo Fernandez	Santa Rosa at-large	Governor of Laguna; lost
NUP	Pablo John Garcia	Cebu–3rd	Not running
NUP	Harris Ongchuan	Northern Samar–2nd	Governor of Northern Samar; won
NUP	Marjorie Ann Teodoro	Marikina–1st	Mayor of Marikina; won
NUP	Joseph Gilbert Violago	Nueva Ecija–2nd	Not running
PFP	Jam Agarao	Laguna–4th	Board member of Laguna, won
PFP	Jose Maria Zubiri Jr.	Bukidnon–3rd	Not running
Tutok To Win	Sam Verzosa	Party-list	Mayor of Manila; lost

== Candidates ==
On January 14, 2025, the Supreme Court ordered the COMELEC to add several aspirants on the ballot after disqualifying them. This includes congressional candidate Edgar Erice in Caloocan's 2nd district, and Charles Savellano in Ilocos Sur's 1st district. The commission announced that they will comply with the court's order, and ordered the reprinting of ballots that did not have the names of the petitioners.

For the first time in Philippine history, the COMELEC second division on May 7, 2025, disqualified a candidate, Ian Sia, who is running to represent Pasig's at-large district for making discriminatory remarks during campaigning. Sia appealed the case, saying his admitted violation of the Safe Spaces Act is not an election offense and should not be grounds for his disqualification. The COMELEC also suspended the proclamation as winners on candidates who have pending disqualification cases, including Marcelino Teodoro, who defeated Senator Koko Pimentel in Marikina.

In October 2025, the Supreme Court dismissed Erice's disqualification, affirming Erice's victory, ruling that the commission had no authority to disqualify a candidate violating the Omnibus Election Code, only the courts.

== Marginal seats ==
=== Elections in congressional districts ===
These are the marginal seats that had a winning margin of 5% or less in the 2022 elections, in ascending order via margin:

Province/City	District	Incumbent	Party	2022 margin	2025 results
Laguna	4th	Jam Agarao	PFP	0.07%	Incumbent retiring
Zamboanga del Norte	1st	Pinpin Uy	Lakas	0.33%	Incumbent won reelection
Zamboanga Sibugay	2nd	Antonieta Eudela	Lakas	0.81%	Incumbent lost reelection
Quezon City	4th	Marvin Rillo	Lakas	1.18%	Incumbent lost reelection
Manila	5th	Irwin Tieng	Lakas	1.98%	Incumbent won reelection
Negros Oriental	3rd	Arnie Teves	NPC	2.03%	Incumbent expelled
Batangas	2nd	Gerville Luistro	Lakas	2.18%	Incumbent won reelection
Bulacan	6th	Salvador Pleyto	Lakas	2.26%	Incumbent won reelection
Tawi-Tawi	lone	Dimszar Sali	NUP	2.86%	Incumbent won reelection
Quezon City	3rd	Franz Pumaren	NUP	3.27%	Incumbent won reelection
Calamba	lone	Cha Hernandez	Lakas	3.28%	Incumbent won reelection
Camarines Norte	1st	Josefina Tallado	Lakas	3.38%	Incumbent won reelection
Iligan	lone	Celso Regencia	Lakas	3.54%	Incumbent won reelection
Agusan del Norte	1st	Jose Aquino II	Lakas	3.91%	Incumbent redistricted
Sorsogon	2nd	Wowo Fortes	NPC	3.94%	Incumbent won reelection
Misamis Oriental	1st	Christian Unabia	Lakas	4.02%	Incumbent lost reelection
Cebu	2nd	Edsel Galeos	Lakas	4.33%	Incumbent won reelection
Surigao del Sur	1st	Romeo Momo	Nacionalista	4.33%	Incumbent won reelection
Cavite	1st	Jolo Revilla	Lakas	4.62%	Incumbent won reelection
Pangasinan	2nd	Mark Cojuangco	NPC	4.98%	Incumbent won reelection

=== Party-list election ===
The following party-lists won less than 2% of the vote in 2022, and only won one seat each because all of party-list seats have not been filled up by the parties that did win at least 2% of the vote. These are sorted by number of votes in descending order.

Less than 2% of the vote, but greater than or equal to 1%:

- Ang Probinsyano Party-list (Alfred delos Santos)
- Uswag Ilonggo (James Ang Jr.)
- Tutok To Win Party-List (Sam Verzosa)
- Citizens' Battle Against Corruption (Eddie Villanueva)
- Senior Citizens Partylist (Rodolfo Ordanes)
- Duterte Youth (Drixie Mae Cardema)
- Agimat ng Masa (Bryan Revilla)
- Kabataan (Raoul Manuel)
- Agrikultura Ngayon Gawing Akma at Tama (Reynaldo Tamayo)
- Marino Party List (Carlo Lisandro Gonzales)
- Ako Bisaya (Sonny Lagon)
- Probinsyano Ako (Rudys Caesar Fariñas)
- LPG Marketers Association (Allan Ty)
- Abante Pangasinan-Ilokano Party (Michael Morden)
- Gabriela Women's Party (Arlene Brosas)
- Construction Workers Solidarity (Edwin Gardiola)
- AGRI Partylist (Wilbert T. Lee)
- P3PWD Party List (unseated (Note: Prevented from assuming seat on June 29, 2022 through a temporary restraining order issued by the Supreme Court.))
- Ako Ilocano Ako (Richelle Singson-Michael)
- Kusug Tausug (Shernee Tan-Tambut)
- Kalinga Partylist (Irene Gay Saulog)
- AGAP Partylist (Nicanor Briones)
Less than 1% of the vote:
- Coop-NATCCO (Felimon Espares)
- Malasakit at Bayanihan Foundation (Anthony Golez)
- Barangay Health Wellness Partylist (Angelica Natasha Co)
- Galing sa Puso Party (Jose Gay Padiernos)
- Bagong Henerasyon (Bernadette Herrera)
- ACT Teachers Partylist (France Castro)
- TGP Partylist (Jose Teves Jr.)
- Bicol Saro (Brian Yamsuan)
- United Senior Citizens (Milagros Magsaysay)
- DUMPER Partylist (Claudine Bautista-Lim)
- Pinuno Partylist (Ivan Howard Guintu)
- Abang Lingkod (Joseph Stephen Paduano)
- PBA Partylist (Migs Nograles)
- OFW Partylist (Marissa Magsino)
- Abono Partylist (Robert Raymond Estrella)
- Anakalusugan (Ray Florence Reyes)
- Kabalikat ng Mamamayan (Ron Salo)
- Magsasaka Partylist (Argel Joseph Cabatbat)
- 1-Pacman Party List (Mikee Romero)
- APEC Partylist (Sergio Dagooc)
- Pusong Pinoy (Jernie Jett Nisay)
- Trade Union Congress Party (Raymond Mendoza)
- Patrol Partylist (Jorge Antonio Bustos)
- Manila Teachers Party-List (Virgilio Lacson)
- AAMBIS-Owa Party List (Lex Anthony Colada)
- Philreca Party-List (Presley de Jesus)
- ALONA Partylist (Anna Villaraza-Suarez)
- Akbayan (Perci Cendaña)

== Campaign ==
On February 5, the final session day before Congress goes on recess for campaigning, the House of Representatives impeached Vice President Sara Duterte. The Senate then received the articles of impeachment later in the day, an hour or so before the Senate went on recess. Sara Duterte then endorsed the candidates that are going up against those who signed the impeachment complaint against her. On February, Duterte endorsed Team Deretso of the Radaza family in Lapu-Lapu City against Cynthia Chan's ticket; Chan voted for impeachment, but she is switching places with her husband Junard, the incumbent mayor. On April, Duterte visited the Duranos in Danao, Cebu, but did not endorse anyone. A few days later, Duterte did endorse the Duranos, including Danao city mayor Mix, who is the opponent of impeachment signer Duke Frasco.

In Manila's 3rd district, Duterte endorsed Apple Nieto, the opponent of Joel Chua, who is the chairman of the House Committee on Good Government and Public Accountability that led the investigations on Duterte's alleged misuse of her confidential funds that led to her impeachment. In the sixth district, Duterte campaigned against Benny Abante, endorsing his opponent Joey Uy. In the 2nd district, Duterte campaigned against Rolando Valeriano; Valeriano was the congressman who delivered a speech that led to the investigation onto the alleged confidential funds misuse.

Duterte also endorsed Dan Lim's slate in Bohol, including congressional candidates Modesto Membreve and McAldous Castañares, opponents of Vanvan Aumentado and Alexie Tutor, respectively. Duterte remarked "I don't let politicians become godparents to my children. You never know when one of them might stab you in the back." One of Aumentado's children has Duterte as a grandmother. In Zamboanga City, Duterte endorsed the Team Zamboanga slate of the Olasos, including the congressional candidacies of Kaiser Adan Olaso and Jerry Perez. In Basilan, Duterte endorsed the Basilan Unity Party slate, including the congressional candidacy of Hanie Bud. In Batangas, Romualdez backed Gerville Luistro against Raneo Abu, who is being backed by Duterte.

== Results ==
The COMELEC originally announced that there were 317 seats up for this election, of which 254 came from congressional districts, and 63 from the party-list system.

In September 2025, five months after the election, the COMELEC announced a 64th party-list seat was available, increasing the number of seats to 318.

=== Elections on congressional districts ===
A map illustrating the manner of victory (plurality, majority, unopposed) per congressional district in the 2025 Philippine House of Representatives election.

After the election, Lakas–CMD emerged as the largest party in the House of Representatives, securing 104 seats. Speaker Martin Romualdez said that it "is a vote of confidence not just in our candidates, but in the kind of leadership and unity that Lakas-CMD represents." If Romualdez's pronouncments hold, Lakas' seats actually decreased from prior the election, as they had 109 seats by then. Jude Acidre later said that 100 of the 115 members who had voted to impeach Sara Duterte successfully defended their seats. Several figures in the impeachment, such as Rolando Valeriano and Joel Chua of Manila, as well as Gerville Luistro of Batangas successfully won their seats despite Duterte's endorsement of their opponents. However, other figures also lost, such as Mannix Dalipe of Zamboanga City. In addition, Danilo Fernandez was also defeated in the Laguna gubernatorial election.

On June 18, 2025, the COMELEC second division ruled that the certificate of candidacy of Joey Uy, who was vying for the seat of Manila's 6th district, was void ab initio, and declared incumbent Benny Abante as the duly elected representative for the district. Uy's motion for reconsideration was then dismissed by the COMELEC en banc on June 30, affirming Abante's victory, and ordering the latter's proclamation as the rightful winner. Uy filed a case in the Supreme Court when the House of Representatives disallowed his inclusion in its roster of members, citing the COMELEC decision. Abante was proclaimed the winner on July 8.

On June 25, 2025, the COMELEC en banc affirmed Marcelino Teodoro's victory over Koko Pimentel for the seat of Marikina's 1st district. The COMELEC then lifted its suspension of Teodoro's proclamation as the rightful winner. Pimentel said he will appeal to the Supreme Court. Teodoro was then proclaimed as the winner, and took his oath of office on July 1.

Party	Votes	%	+/–	Seats	+/–
Lakas–CMD	16,596,698	32.87	+23.70	103	+77
National Unity Party	6,080,987	12.05	+0.13	32	−1
Nationalist People's Coalition	5,974,201	11.83	−0.60	31	−4
Partido Federal ng Pilipinas	5,286,538	10.47	+9.53	27	+25
Nacionalista Party	4,724,803	9.36	−4.38	22	−14
Liberal Party	1,555,941	3.08	−0.70	6	−4
Aksyon Demokratiko	1,341,540	2.66	+0.72	2	+2
PDP–Laban	666,067	1.32	−21.45	2	−64
Hugpong sa Tawong Lungsod	542,710	1.07	+0.93	3	+3
Laban ng Demokratikong Pilipino	314,981	0.62	−0.16	2	+1
People's Reform Party	292,665	0.58	−1.38	1	−2
Pwersa ng Masang Pilipino	269,949	0.53	+0.52	2	+2
United Bangsamoro Justice Party	236,857	0.47	−0.14	0	0
Unang Sigaw	183,912	0.36	−0.29	0	0
Makatizens United Party	150,189	0.30	New	2	New
Sama Sama Tarlac	143,868	0.28	New	0	0
United Nationalist Alliance	142,655	0.28	+0.14	1	0
Katipunan ng Nagkakaisang Pilipino	134,137	0.27	+0.26	0	0
National Unity Party/United Negros Alliance	130,023	0.26	−0.27	1	−1
Centrist Democratic Party of the Philippines	127,646	0.25	−0.02	1	0
Partido Navoteño	116,622	0.23	+0.06	1	0
One Capiz	109,249	0.22	New	0	0
Reform PH Party	107,966	0.21	New	0	0
Lakas–CMD/One Cebu	104,768	0.21	New	1	New
Adelante Zamboanga Party	100,035	0.20	+0.05	1	0
Padajon Surigao	99,856	0.20	New	0	0
Galing at Serbisyo para sa Mindoreño	91,073	0.18	New	0	0
Filipino Rights Protection Advocates of Manila Movement	87,183	0.17	New	0	0
Nationalist People's Coalition/One Cebu	74,936	0.15	New	1	New
Asenso Manileño	70,780	0.14	New	1	0
Akay National Political Party	68,524	0.14	New	0	0
Workers' and Peasants' Party	50,618	0.10	+0.00	0	0
Kusog Bicolandia	33,789	0.07	New	0	0
Partido Lakas ng Masa	28,746	0.06	+0.05	0	0
Asenso Abrenio	23,308	0.05	New	0	0
Makabayan	22,698	0.04	New	0	0
Partido Demokratiko Sosyalista ng Pilipinas	14,343	0.03	−0.13	0	0
Partido para sa Demokratikong Reporma	12,672	0.03	−0.96	0	0
Independent	4,371,611	8.66	+4.23	11	+5
Party-list seats				64	+1
Total	50,485,144	100.00	–	318	+1
Valid votes	50,485,144	88.46	+1.48		
Invalid/blank votes	6,585,150	11.54	−1.48		
Total votes	57,070,294	100.00	–		
Registered voters/turnout	68,431,965	83.40	−0.70		
Source: COMELEC (results per district, registered voters)

Vote share
Lakas	32.87%
NUP	12.05%
NPC	11.83%
PFP	10.47%
Nacionalista	9.36%
Others	23.42%

Congressional district seats
Lakas	40.55%
NUP	12.20%
NPC	12.20%
PFP	10.63%
Nacionalista	8.66%
Others	15.75%

==== Results per region ====
Region	Details	Lakas	NUP	NPC	PFP	NP	Others	Total
Ilocos Region	Details	6 / 12	0 / 12	3 / 12	1 / 12	2 / 12	0 / 12	12 / 318
Cordillera Administrative Region	Details	2 / 7	0 / 7	2 / 7	1 / 7	1 / 7	1 / 7	7 / 318
Cagayan Valley	Details	9 / 12	0 / 12	1 / 12	1 / 12	0 / 12	1 / 12	12 / 318
Central Luzon	Details	12 / 24	4 / 24	2 / 24	4 / 24	1 / 24	1 / 24	24 / 318
Metro Manila	Details	9 / 33	7 / 33	2 / 33	1 / 33	4 / 33	10 / 33	33 / 318
Calabarzon	Details	10 / 31	7 / 31	9 / 31	1 / 31	3 / 31	1 / 31	31 / 318
Mimaropa	Details	2 / 8	0 / 8	1 / 8	1 / 8	1 / 8	3 / 8	8 / 318
Bicol Region	Details	7 / 16	3 / 16	3 / 16	1 / 16	0 / 16	2 / 16	16 / 318
Western Visayas	Details	5 / 12	3 / 12	3 / 12	0 / 12	1 / 12	1 / 12	12 / 318
Negros Island Region	Details	4 / 11	1 / 11	2 / 11	2 / 11	0 / 11	2 / 11	11 / 318
Central Visayas	Details	6 / 14	2 / 14	1 / 14	1 / 14	0 / 14	4 / 14	14 / 318
Eastern Visayas	Details	5 / 13	2 / 13	1 / 13	2 / 13	2 / 13	1 / 13	13 / 318
Zamboanga Peninsula	Details	6 / 11	0 / 11	0 / 11	2 / 11	0 / 11	3 / 11	11 / 318
Northern Mindanao	Details	7 / 14	1 / 14	0 / 14	2 / 14	3 / 14	1 / 14	14 / 318
Davao Region	Details	4 / 11	0 / 11	1 / 11	1 / 11	1 / 11	4 / 11	11 / 318
Soccsksargen	Details	3 / 10	0 / 10	0 / 10	3 / 10	1 / 10	3 / 10	10 / 318
Caraga	Details	3 / 9	2 / 9	0 / 9	1 / 9	2 / 9	1 / 9	9 / 318
Bangsamoro	Details	3 / 6	1 / 6	0 / 6	2 / 6	0 / 6	0 / 6	6 / 318
Party-list							64 / 64	64 / 318
Philippines		103 / 318	32 / 318	31 / 318	27 / 318	22 / 318	102 / 318	317 / 317

==== Results per district ====
Congressional district	Incumbent	Incumbent's party	Winner	Winner's party	Winning margin
Abra	Ching Bernos	Lakas	Joseph Bernos	Lakas	70.98%
Agusan del Norte	Dale Corvera	Lakas	Dale Corvera	Lakas	Unopposed
Agusan del Sur–1st	Alfel Bascug	NUP	Alfel Bascug	NUP	Unopposed
Agusan del Sur–2nd	Eddiebong Plaza	NUP	Eddiebong Plaza	NUP	Unopposed
Aklan–1st	Carlito Marquez	NPC	Jess Marquez	NPC	7.82%
Aklan–2nd	Teodorico Haresco Jr.	Nacionalista	Florencio Miraflores	NPC	2.03%
Albay–1st	Vacant		Krisel Lagman	Liberal	8.96%
Albay–2nd	Joey Salceda	Lakas	Caloy Loria	PDP	1.16%
Albay–3rd	Fernando Cabredo	NUP	Adrian Salceda	Lakas	1.90%
Antipolo–1st	Roberto Puno	NUP	Ronaldo Puno	NUP	80.66%
Antipolo–2nd	Romeo Acop	NUP	Romeo Acop	NUP	Unopposed
Antique	Antonio Legarda Jr.	NPC	Antonio Legarda Jr.	NPC	27.17%
Apayao	Eleanor Begtang	NPC	Eleanor Begtang	NPC	Unopposed
Aurora	Rommel T. Angara	LDP	Rommel T. Angara	LDP	Unopposed
Bacolod	Greg Gasataya	NPC	Albee Benitez	Independent	15.51%
Baguio	Mark Go	Nacionalista	Mauricio Domogan	Independent	10.19%
Basilan	Mujiv Hataman	BUP	Yusop Alano	PFP	13.02%
Bataan–1st	Geraldine Roman	Lakas	Tony Roman	Lakas	Unopposed
Bataan–2nd	Albert Garcia	NUP	Albert Garcia	NUP	Unopposed
Bataan–3rd	Maria Angela Garcia	NUP	Maria Angela Garcia	NUP	75.02%
Batanes	Jun Gato	NPC	Jun Gato	NPC	32.20%
Batangas–1st	Eric Buhain	Nacionalista	Leandro Leviste	Independent	49.16%
Batangas–2nd	Gerville Luistro	Lakas	Gerville Luistro	Lakas	24.36%
Batangas–3rd	Maria Theresa Collantes	NPC	King Collantes	NPC	25.27%
Batangas–4th	Lianda Bolilia	Nacionalista	Caloy Bolilia	Nacionalista	5.93%
Batangas–5th	Marvey Mariño	Nacionalista	Beverley Dimacuha	Nacionalista	74.60%
Batangas–6th	Vacant		Ryan Recto	Nacionalista	9.83%
Benguet	Eric Yap	Lakas	Eric Yap	Lakas	39.38%
Biliran	Gerardo Espina Jr.	Lakas	Gerardo Espina Jr.	Lakas	Unopposed
Biñan	Len Alonte	Lakas	Arman Dimaguila	Lakas	25.24%
Bohol–1st	Edgar Chatto	NUP	John Geesnell Yap	LDP	9.13%
Bohol–2nd	Vanvan Aumentado	Lakas	Vanvan Aumentado	Lakas	57.72%
Bohol–3rd	Alexie Tutor	Lakas	Alexie Tutor	Lakas	44.46%
Bukidnon–1st	Jose Manuel Alba	Lakas	Jose Manuel Alba	Lakas	15.42%
Bukidnon–2nd	Jonathan Keith Flores	Lakas	Jonathan Keith Flores	Lakas	66.94%
Bukidnon–3rd	Jose Maria Zubiri Jr.	PFP	Audrey Zubiri	PFP	88.48%
Bukidnon–4th	Laarni Roque	Nacionalista	Laarni Roque	Nacionalista	7.31%
Bulacan–1st	Danny Domingo	NUP	Danny Domingo	NUP	62.14%
Bulacan–2nd	Tina Pancho	NUP	Tina Pancho	NUP	88.50%
Bulacan–3rd	Lorna Silverio	NUP	Cholo Violago	Lakas	21.47%
Bulacan–4th	Linabelle Villarica	PFP	Linabelle Villarica	PFP	51.08%
Bulacan–5th	Ambrosio Cruz	Lakas	Agay Cruz	Lakas	70.22%
Bulacan–6th	Salvador Pleyto	Lakas	Salvador Pleyto	Lakas	Unopposed
Butuan	New district		Jose Aquino II	Lakas	Unopposed
Cagayan–1st	Ramon Nolasco Jr.	Lakas	Ramon Nolasco	Lakas	16.54%
Cagayan–2nd	Baby Alfonso	Lakas	Baby Alfonso	Lakas	21.43%
Cagayan–3rd	Joseph Lara	Lakas	Joseph Lara	Lakas	20.84%
Cagayan de Oro–1st	Lordan Suan	Lakas	Lordan Suan	Lakas	1.98%
Cagayan de Oro–2nd	Rufus Rodriguez	CDP	Rufus Rodriguez	CDP	89.08%
Calamba	Cha Hernandez	Lakas	Cha Hernandez	Lakas	50.96%
Caloocan–1st	Oscar Malapitan	Nacionalista	Oscar Malapitan	Nacionalista	46.69%
Caloocan–2nd	Mitzi Cajayon	Lakas	Edgar Erice	Liberal	16.38%
Caloocan–3rd	Dean Asistio	Lakas	Dean Asistio	Lakas	Unopposed
Camarines Norte–1st	Josefina Tallado	Lakas	Josefina Tallado	Lakas	0.60%
Camarines Norte–2nd	Rosemarie Panotes	Lakas	Rosemarie Panotes	Lakas	55.89%
Camarines Sur–1st	Hori Horibata	NUP	Hori Horibata	NUP	14.64%
Camarines Sur–2nd	Luis Raymund Villafuerte	NUP	Luigi Villafuerte	NUP	27.44%
Camarines Sur–3rd	Gabriel Bordado	Liberal	Nelson Legacion	Lakas	1.41%
Camarines Sur–4th	Arnulf Bryan Fuentebella	NPC	Arnulf Bryan Fuentebella	NPC	12.22%
Camarines Sur–5th	Miguel Luis Villafuerte	NUP	Miguel Luis Villafuerte	NUP	56.86%
Camiguin	Jurdin Jesus Romualdo	Lakas	Jurdin Jesus Romualdo	Lakas	33.82%
Capiz–1st	Tawi Billones	Liberal	Ivan Howard Guintu	Independent	9.26%
Capiz–2nd	Jane Castro	Lakas	Jane Castro	Lakas	Unopposed
Catanduanes	Leo Rodriguez	PFP	Leo Rodriguez	PFP	0.59%
Cavite–1st	Jolo Revilla	Lakas	Jolo Revilla	Lakas	55.86%
Cavite–2nd	Lani Mercado	Lakas	Lani Mercado	Lakas	Unopposed
Cavite–3rd	AJ Advincula	NUP	AJ Advincula	NUP	10.37%
Cavite–4th	Vacant		Kiko Barzaga	NUP	4.74%
Cavite–5th	Roy Loyola	NPC	Roy Loyola	NPC	22.00%
Cavite–6th	Antonio Ferrer	NUP	Antonio Ferrer	NUP	Unopposed
Cavite–7th	Crispin Diego Remulla	NUP	Crispin Diego Remulla	NUP	69.20%
Cavite–8th	Aniela Tolentino	NUP	Aniela Tolentino	NUP	55.80%
Cebu–1st	Rhea Gullas	Lakas	Rhea Gullas	Lakas	Unopposed
Cebu–2nd	Edsel Galeos	Lakas	Edsel Galeos	Lakas	20.96%
Cebu–3rd	Pablo John Garcia	NUP	Karen Garcia	NUP	Unopposed
Cebu–4th	Janice Salimbangon	NUP	Sun Shimura	PMP	6.00%
Cebu–5th	Duke Frasco	NUP	Duke Frasco	NUP	24.02%
Cebu–6th	Daphne Lagon	Lakas	Daphne Lagon	Lakas	Unopposed
Cebu–7th	Peter John Calderon	NPC	Patricia Calderon	NPC	24.87%
Cebu City–1st	Rachel del Mar	NPC	Rachel del Mar	NPC	9.56%
Cebu City–2nd	Eduardo Rama Jr.	Lakas	Eduardo Rama Jr.	Lakas	15.78%
Cotabato–1st	Joel Sacdalan	NPC	Edwin Cruzado	PMP	1.84%
Cotabato–2nd	Rudy Caoagdan	Nacionalista	Rudy Caoagdan	Nacionalista	89.48%
Cotabato–3rd	Samantha Santos	Lakas	Samantha Santos	Lakas	Unopposed
Davao City–1st	Paolo Duterte	HTL	Paolo Duterte	HTL	59.72%
Davao City–2nd	Vincent Garcia	Lakas	Omar Duterte	HTL	27.83%
Davao City–3rd	Isidro Ungab	HTL	Isidro Ungab	HTL	64.25%
Davao de Oro–1st	Maricar Zamora	Lakas	Maricar Zamora	Lakas	43.24%
Davao de Oro–2nd	Ruwel Peter Gonzaga	PFP	Jhong Ceniza	Independent	12.78%
Davao del Norte–1st	Pantaleon Alvarez	Reporma	Oyo Uy	Lakas	18.79%
Davao del Norte–2nd	Alan Dujali	Lakas	JM Lagdameo	PFP	31.05%
Davao del Sur	John Tracy Cagas	Nacionalista	John Tracy Cagas	Nacionalista	41.22%
Davao Occidental	Claude Bautista	NPC	Claude Bautista	NPC	Unopposed
Davao Oriental–1st	Nelson Dayanghirang	Nacionalista	Nelson Dayanghirang Jr.	Lakas	23.40%
Davao Oriental–2nd	Cheeno Almario	Lakas	Cheeno Almario	Lakas	21.86%
Dinagat Islands	Alan Ecleo	Lakas	Kaka Bag-ao	Liberal	9.82%
Eastern Samar	Maria Fe Abunda	Lakas	Sheen Gonzales	Independent	24.30%
General Santos	Loreto Acharon	NPC	Shirlyn Bañas-Nograles	PDP	27.14%
Guimaras	Lucille Nava	NUP	JC Rahman Nava	NUP	79.70%
Ifugao	Solomon Chungalao	NPC	Solomon Chungalao	NPC	9.83%
Iligan	Celso Regencia	Lakas	Celso Regencia	Lakas	10.50%
Ilocos Norte–1st	Sandro Marcos	PFP	Sandro Marcos	PFP	Unopposed
Ilocos Norte–2nd	Eugenio Angelo Barba	Nacionalista	Eugenio Angelo Barba	Nacionalista	Unopposed
Ilocos Sur–1st	Ronald Singson	NPC	Ronald Singson	NPC	84.72%
Ilocos Sur–2nd	Kristine Singson-Meehan	NPC	Kristine Singson-Meehan	NPC	36.36%
Iloilo–1st	Janette Garin	Lakas	Janette Garin	Lakas	75.40%
Iloilo–2nd	Michael Gorriceta	Nacionalista	Kathryn Joyce Gorriceta	Lakas	Unopposed
Iloilo–3rd	Lorenz Defensor	NUP	Lorenz Defensor	NUP	97.28%
Iloilo–4th	Ferjenel Biron	Nacionalista	Ferjenel Biron	Nacionalista	27.46%
Iloilo–5th	Raul Tupas	Lakas	Binky April Tupas	Lakas	12.36%
Iloilo City	Julienne Baronda	Lakas	Julienne Baronda	Lakas	58.42%
Isabela–1st	Tonypet Albano	Lakas	Tonypet Albano	Lakas	Unopposed
Isabela–2nd	Ed Christopher Go	Lakas	Ed Christopher Go	Lakas	Unopposed
Isabela–3rd	Ian Paul Dy	Lakas	Ian Paul Dy	Lakas	Unopposed
Isabela–4th	Joseph Tan	Lakas	Joseph Tan	Lakas	47.48%
Isabela–5th	Mike Dy III	Lakas	Mike Dy III	Lakas	Unopposed
Isabela–6th	Inno Dy	Lakas	Faustino Dy III	PFP	Unopposed
Kalinga	Allen Jesse Mangaoang	Nacionalista	Caroline Agyao	PFP	15.09%
La Union–1st	Paolo Ortega	Lakas	Paolo Ortega	Lakas	48.72%
La Union–2nd	Dante Garcia	Lakas	Dante Garcia	Lakas	63.00%
Laguna–1st	Ann Matibag	Lakas	Ann Matibag	Lakas	Unopposed
Laguna–2nd	Ruth Hernandez	Lakas	Ramil Hernandez	Lakas	2.32%
Laguna–3rd	Loreto Amante	Lakas	Loreto Amante	Lakas	75.96%
Laguna–4th	Jam Agarao	PFP	Benjamin Agarao Jr.	PFP	0.12%
Lanao del Norte–1st	Mohamad Khalid Dimaporo	Lakas	Imelda Dimaporo	PFP	73.16%
Lanao del Norte–2nd	Aminah Dimaporo	Lakas	Aminah Dimaporo	Lakas	78.20%
Lanao del Sur–1st	Zia Alonto Adiong	Lakas	Zia Alonto Adiong	Lakas	45.00%
Lanao del Sur–2nd	Yasser Balindong	Lakas	Yasser Balindong	Lakas	60.40%
Lapu-Lapu City	Cynthia Chan	Lakas	Junard Chan	PFP	44.34%
Las Piñas	Camille Villar	Nacionalista	Mark Anthony Santos	Independent	12.80%
Leyte–1st	Martin Romualdez	Lakas	Martin Romualdez	Lakas	Unopposed
Leyte–2nd	Lolita Javier	Nacionalista	Lolita Javier	Nacionalista	60.06%
Leyte–3rd	Anna Veloso Tuazon	NUP	Anna Veloso Tuazon	NUP	6.94%
Leyte–4th	Richard Gomez	PFP	Richard Gomez	PFP	13.88%
Leyte–5th	Carl Cari	Lakas	Carl Cari	Lakas	51.88%
Maguindanao del Norte	Dimple Mastura	Lakas	Dimple Mastura	Lakas	32.60%
Maguindanao del Sur	Tong Paglas	Lakas	Esmael Mangudadatu	PFP	0.24%
Makati–1st	Kid Peña	NPC	Monique Lagdameo	MKTZNU	84.08%
Makati–2nd	Luis Campos	NPC	Alden Almario	MKTZNU	10.38%
Malabon	Josephine Lacson-Noel	NPC	Antolin Oreta III	NUP	34.64%
Mandaluyong	Neptali Gonzales II	NUP	Alexandria Gonzales	NUP	Unopposed
Mandaue	Emmarie Dizon	Lakas	Emmarie Dizon	Lakas	19.10%
Manila–1st	Ernix Dionisio	Lakas	Ernix Dionisio	Lakas	10.55%
Manila–2nd	Rolando Valeriano	NUP	Rolando Valeriano	NUP	5.48%
Manila–3rd	Joel Chua	Lakas	Joel Chua	Lakas	3.24%
Manila–4th	Edward Maceda	NPC	Giselle Maceda	Asenso Manileño	14.41%
Manila–5th	Irwin Tieng	Lakas	Irwin Tieng	Lakas	4.16%
Manila–6th	Benny Abante	NUP	Benny Abante	NUP	Unopposed (Note: Abante's opponent, Joey Uy, was disqualified after his proclamation as the winner, with all of Uy's votes were classified as stray, and Abante was proclaimed instead)
Marikina–1st	Marjorie Ann Teodoro	NUP	Marcelino Teodoro	NUP	44.14%
Marikina–2nd	Stella Quimbo	Lakas	Miro Quimbo	Lakas	23.50%
Marinduque	Lord Allan Velasco	NPC	Rey Salvacion	Independent	13.18%
Masbate–1st	Richard Kho	Lakas	Antonio Kho	Lakas	Unopposed
Masbate–2nd	Olga Kho	Lakas	Ara Kho	Lakas	44.55%
Masbate–3rd	Tonton Kho	Lakas	Tonton Kho	Lakas	78.36%
Misamis Occidental–1st	Jason Almonte	Nacionalista	Jason Almonte	Nacionalista	62.16%
Misamis Occidental–2nd	Ando Oaminal	Lakas	Ando Oaminal	Lakas	86.70%
Misamis Oriental–1st	Christian Unabia	Lakas	Karen Lagbas	NUP	10.98%
Misamis Oriental–2nd	Yevgeny Emano	Nacionalista	Yevgeny Emano	Nacionalista	80.80%
Mountain Province	Maximo Dalog Jr.	Nacionalista	Maximo Dalog Jr.	Nacionalista	Unopposed
Muntinlupa	Jaime Fresnedi	Liberal	Jaime Fresnedi	Liberal	51.58%
Navotas	Toby Tiangco	Navoteño	Toby Tiangco	Navoteño	91.14%
Negros Occidental–1st	Gerardo Valmayor Jr.	NPC	Jules Ledesma	NPC	90.54%
Negros Occidental–2nd	Alfredo Marañon III	NUP	Alfredo Marañon III	NUP	Unopposed
Negros Occidental–3rd	Vacant		Javi Benitez	PFP	84.06%
Negros Occidental–4th	Yoyette Ferrer	NUP	Jeffrey Ferrer	NUP	28.40%
Negros Occidental–5th	Dino Yulo	Lakas	Dino Yulo	Lakas	69.34%
Negros Occidental–6th	Mercedes Lansang	NPC	Mercedes Lansang	NPC	68.30%
Negros Oriental–1st	Jocelyn Limkaichong	NPC	Emmanuel Iway	PFP	25.08%
Negros Oriental–2nd	Chiquiting Sagarbarria	NPC	Maisa Sagarbarria	Lakas	20.06%
Negros Oriental–3rd	Vacant		Janice Degamo	Lakas	28.45%
Northern Samar–1st	Paul Daza	NUP	Niko Raul Daza	NUP	78.50%
Northern Samar–2nd	Harris Ongchuan	NUP	Edwin Ongchuan	PFP	73.98%
Nueva Ecija–1st	Mika Suansing	Lakas	Mika Suansing	Lakas	69.07%
Nueva Ecija–2nd	Joseph Gilbert Violago	NUP	Kokoy Salvador	PFP	0.29%
Nueva Ecija–3rd	Rosanna Vergara	PFP	Jay Vergara	PFP	2.84%
Nueva Ecija–4th	Emeng Pascual	Lakas	Emeng Pascual	Lakas	14.64%
Nueva Vizcaya	Luisa Cuaresma	UNA	Tim Cayton	Aksyon	9.53%
Occidental Mindoro	Odie Tarriela	PFP	Odie Tarriela	PFP	26.72%
Oriental Mindoro–1st	Arnan Panaligan	Lakas	Arnan Panaligan	Lakas	Unopposed
Oriental Mindoro–2nd	Alfonso Umali Jr.	Liberal	Alfonso Umali Jr.	Liberal	11.19%
Palawan–1st	Vacant		Rose Salvame	PRP	18.28%
Palawan–2nd	Jose Alvarez	NPC	Jose Alvarez	NPC	34.58%
Palawan–3rd	Vacant		Gil Acosta Jr.	Lakas	3.86%
Pampanga–1st	Carmelo Lazatin II	Lakas	Carmelo Lazatin Jr.	PFP	Unopposed
Pampanga–2nd	Gloria Macapagal Arroyo	Lakas	Gloria Macapagal Arroyo	Lakas	Unopposed
Pampanga–3rd	Aurelio Gonzales Jr.	Lakas	Mica Gonzales	Lakas	12.55%
Pampanga–4th	Anna York Bondoc	Nacionalista	Anna York Bondoc	Nacionalista	31.33%
Pangasinan–1st	Arthur Celeste	Nacionalista	Arthur Celeste	Nacionalista	Unopposed
Pangasinan–2nd	Mark Cojuangco	NPC	Mark Cojuangco	NPC	54.28%
Pangasinan–3rd	Maria Rachel Arenas	Lakas	Maria Rachel Arenas	Lakas	84.84%
Pangasinan–4th	Christopher de Venecia	Lakas	Gina de Venecia	Lakas	69.50%
Pangasinan–5th	Ramon Guico Jr.	Lakas	Ramon Guico Jr.	Lakas	30.60%
Pangasinan–6th	Marlyn Primicias-Agabas	Lakas	Marlyn Primicias-Agabas	Lakas	17.92%
Parañaque–1st	Edwin Olivarez	Lakas	Eric Olivarez	Lakas	Unopposed
Parañaque–2nd	Gustavo Tambunting	NUP	Brian Yamsuan	Independent	6.13%
Pasay	Antonino Calixto	Lakas	Antonino Calixto	Lakas	28.36%
Pasig	Roman Romulo	NPC	Roman Romulo	NPC	90.80%
Quezon–1st	Mark Enverga	NPC	Mark Enverga	NPC	Unopposed
Quezon–2nd	David C. Suarez	Lakas	David Suarez	Lakas	Unopposed
Quezon–3rd	Reynante Arrogancia	NPC	Reynante Arrogancia	NPC	39.10%
Quezon–4th	Keith Micah Tan	NPC	Keith Micah Tan	NPC	Unopposed
Quezon City–1st	Arjo Atayde	Nacionalista	Arjo Atayde	Nacionalista	17.06%
Quezon City–2nd	Ralph Tulfo	PFP	Ralph Tulfo	PFP	67.84%
Quezon City–3rd	Franz Pumaren	NUP	Franz Pumaren	NUP	12.20%
Quezon City–4th	Marvin Rillo	Lakas	Bong Suntay	UNA	0.14%
Quezon City–5th	Patrick Michael Vargas	Lakas	Patrick Michael Vargas	Lakas	5.41%
Quezon City–6th	Marivic Co-Pilar	NUP	Marivic Co-Pilar	NUP	Unopposed
Quirino	Midy Cua	Lakas	Midy Cua	Lakas	Unopposed
Rizal–1st	Jack Duavit	NPC	Mia Ynares	NPC	50.95%
Rizal–2nd	Dino Tanjuatco	NPC	Dino Tanjuatco	NPC	71.90%
Rizal–3rd	Jojo Garcia	NPC	Jojo Garcia	NPC	32.68%
Rizal–4th	Fidel Nograles	Lakas	Dennis Hernandez	NPC	4.56%
Romblon	Eleandro Jesus Madrona	Nacionalista	Eleandro Jesus Madrona	Nacionalista	66.05%
Samar–1st	Stephen James Tan	Nacionalista	Stephen James Tan	Nacionalista	Unopposed
Samar–2nd	Reynolds Michael Tan	Lakas	Reynolds Michael Tan	Lakas	Unopposed
San Jose del Monte	Florida Robes	PFP	Arthur Robes	Lakas	48.74%
San Juan	Bel Zamora	Lakas	Bel Zamora	Lakas	33.08%
Santa Rosa	Dan Fernandez	NUP	Roy Gonzales	Lakas	14.74%
Sarangani	Steve Solon	Lakas	Steve Solon	Lakas	62.64%
Siquijor	Zaldy Villa	Lakas	Zaldy Villa	Lakas	14.32%
Sorsogon–1st	Dette Escudero	NPC	Dette Escudero	NPC	Unopposed
Sorsogon–2nd	Wowo Fortes	NPC	Wowo Fortes	NPC	48.86%
South Cotabato–1st	Ed Lumayag	PFP	Ed Lumayag	PFP	12.71%
South Cotabato–2nd	Peter Miguel	Lakas	Ferdinand Hernandez	PFP	16.16%
South Cotabato–3rd	New district		Dibu Tuan	Aksyon	4.66%
Southern Leyte–1st	Luz Mercado	Lakas	Roger Mercado	NPC	39.38%
Southern Leyte–2nd	Christopherson Yap	Lakas	Christopherson Yap	Lakas	4.36%
Sultan Kudarat–1st	Rihan Sakaluran	Lakas	Ruth Sakaluran	Lakas	Unopposed
Sultan Kudarat–2nd	Horacio Suansing Jr.	NUP	Bella Suansing	PFP	Unopposed
Sulu–1st	Samier Tan	Lakas	Samier Tan	Lakas	97.08%
Sulu–2nd	Munir Arbison Jr.	Lakas	Abdulmunir Arbison	Lakas	Unopposed
Surigao del Norte–1st	Francisco Jose Matugas II	Lakas	Francisco Matugas	Lakas	25.16%
Surigao del Norte–2nd	Ace Barbers	Nacionalista	Bernadette Barbers	Nacionalista	10.71%
Surigao del Sur–1st	Romeo Momo	Nacionalista	Romeo Momo	Nacionalista	45.64%
Surigao del Sur–2nd	Johnny Pimentel	NUP	Alexander Pimentel	PFP	7.77%
Taguig–Pateros	Ading Cruz	Nacionalista	Ading Cruz	Nacionalista	15.25%
Taguig	Pammy Zamora	Lakas	Jorge Daniel Bocobo	Nacionalista	10.25%
Tarlac–1st	Jaime Cojuangco	NPC	Jaime Cojuangco	NPC	Unopposed
Tarlac–2nd	Christian Yap	Sama Sama Tarlac	Cristy Angeles	PFP	7.66%
Tarlac–3rd	Bong Rivera	NPC	Bong Rivera	NPC	73.45%
Tawi-Tawi	Dimszar Sali	NUP	Dimszar Sali	NUP	50.76%
Valenzuela–1st	Vacant		Kenneth Gatchalian	NPC	0.49%
Valenzuela–2nd	Eric Martinez	Independent	Gerald Galang	Independent	8.72%
Zambales–1st	Jay Khonghun	Lakas	Jay Khonghun	Lakas	Unopposed
Zambales–2nd	Bing Maniquiz	Lakas	Bing Maniquiz	Lakas	36.82%
Zamboanga City–1st	Khymer Adan Olaso	Nacionalista	Kat Chua	Independent	0.67%
Zamboanga City–2nd	Mannix Dalipe	Lakas	Jerry Perez	AZAP	17.94%
Zamboanga del Norte–1st	Pinpin Uy	Lakas	Pinpin Uy	Lakas	21.87%
Zamboanga del Norte–2nd	Glona Labadlabad	Lakas	Irene Labadlabad	Lakas	45.48%
Zamboanga del Norte–3rd	Ian Amatong	Liberal	Ian Amatong	Liberal	26.56%
Zamboanga del Sur–1st	Divina Grace Yu	Lakas	Joseph Yu	Lakas	16.64%
Zamboanga del Sur–2nd	Victoria Yu	Lakas	Victoria Yu	Lakas	10.00%
Zamboanga Sibugay–1st	Wilter Palma	Lakas	Marlo Bancoro	PFP	11.96%
Zamboanga Sibugay–2nd	Antonieta Eudela	Lakas	Marly Hofer–Hasim	PFP	11.08%
Source: Commission on Elections

=== Party-list election ===
Proclamation of party-list election winners on 19 May 2025.

The COMELEC was expected declare winners at least a week after the election. The COMELEC, sitting as the National Board of Canvassers, first convened on May 13, a day after the election, to canvass the local absentee voting results. The commission canvassed 159 certificates of canvass by Wednesday after the election, on what was said to be record speed, leaving just 16 certificates. Initial calculations had Akbayan, Duterte Youth, Tingog Party List and 4Ps Partylist as winning the maximum three seats, ACT-CIS Partylist and Ako Bikol poised to win two seats, while 47 other parties are set to win 1 seat each.

After the COMELEC finished canvassing the votes on May 16, Akbayan emerged as the party with the most votes in the party-list election, and is poised to win three seats.

Philreca Party-List, the first party that may not win a seat, petitioned COMELEC, pleading that there should be 64 seats contested for party-list representatives, as opposed to 63 as originally announced. The COMELEC then asked all relevant parties for opinions in regard to this, and to the seat distribution.

On May 19, the COMELEC proclaimed 52 party-lists, for 59 of the 63 seats, with Akbayan indeed winning three seats, 4Ps just winning two seats, Philreca being the last party-list to win a seat. They postponed the proclamation of Duterte Youth and Bagong Henerasyon due to pending disqualification cases. Duterte Youth's disqualification case was initiated in 2019 and is still unresolved up to now. Based on the results, Duterte Youth is entitled to three seats, while Bagong Henerasyon is entitled to one.

The commission proclaimed Bagong Henerasyon with one seat on June 5 after dismissing the disqualification case against it. On June 18, the commission's second division cancelled the registration of the Duterte Youth by a vote of 2–1. This decision granted the petition filed by youth leaders in 2019, on the grounds that the commission en banc had approved the party-list's registration that year without publishing its petition and without conducting a proper hearing on the application. On August 29, the commission en banc affirmed the second division's cancellation of Duterte Youth's registration, with a vote of 5–1, with 1 recusing, disqualifying them. As the party can still appeal to the Supreme Court, the commission deems the decision not yet final and executory.

The COMELEC asked permission from the House of Representatives to declare a 64th seat, as the party-list act mandates that party-list representatives should comprise 20 percent of all House members. COMELEC chairman George Garcia said that the secretary-general replied that "the power of the House is merely ministerial. This means that they will accept whoever is proclaimed". The commission then proclaimed Gabriela Women's Party as the 64th party-list member on September 17. On October 2, the commission proclaimed Abono Partylist, Murang Kuryente and Ang Probinsyano Party-list as winners, in lieu of Duterte Youth's supposed three seats. Later that month, it was revealed that the Supreme Court denied Duterte Youth's request for an injunction against COMELEC's disqualification order on them.

Party	Votes	%	Seats	+/–
Akbayan	2,779,621	7.02	3	+2
Tingog Party List	1,822,708	4.60	3	+1
4Ps Partylist	1,469,571	3.71	2	0
ACT-CIS Partylist	1,239,930	3.13	2	−1
Ako Bicol	1,073,119	2.71	2	0
Uswag Ilonggo	777,754	1.96	1	0
Solid North Party	765,322	1.93	1	New
Trabaho Partylist	709,283	1.79	1	+1
Citizens' Battle Against Corruption	593,911	1.50	1	0
Malasakit at Bayanihan	580,100	1.46	1	0
Senior Citizens Partylist	577,753	1.46	1	0
Puwersa ng Pilipinong Pandagat	575,762	1.45	1	New
Mamamayang Liberal	547,949	1.38	1	New
FPJ Panday Bayanihan	538,003	1.36	1	New
United Senior Citizens Partylist	533,913	1.35	1	0
4K Partylist	521,592	1.32	1	New
LPG Marketers Association	517,833	1.31	1	0
Coop-NATCCO	509,913	1.29	1	0
Ako Bisaya	477,796	1.21	1	0
Construction Workers Solidarity	477,517	1.21	1	0
Pinoy Workers Partylist	475,985	1.20	1	New
AGAP Partylist	469,412	1.19	1	0
Asenso Pinoy	423,133	1.07	1	+1
Agimat Partylist	420,813	1.06	1	0
TGP Partylist	407,922	1.03	1	0
SAGIP Partylist	405,297	1.02	1	−1
Alona Partylist	393,684	0.99	1	0
1-Rider Partylist	385,700	0.97	1	−1
Kamanggagawa	382,657	0.97	1	New
Galing sa Puso Party	381,880	0.96	1	0
Kamalayan	381,437	0.96	1	+1
Bicol Saro	366,177	0.92	1	0
Kusug Tausug	365,916	0.92	1	0
Alliance of Concerned Teachers	353,631	0.89	1	0
One Coop	334,098	0.84	1	+1
KM Ngayon Na	324,405	0.82	1	+1
Abante Mindanao	320,349	0.81	1	New
Bagong Henerasyon	319,803	0.81	1	0
Trade Union Congress Party	314,814	0.79	1	0
Kabataan	312,344	0.79	1	0
APEC Partylist	310,427	0.78	1	0
Magbubukid	310,289	0.78	1	New
1Tahanan	309,761	0.78	1	+1
Ako Ilocano Ako	301,406	0.76	1	0
Manila Teachers Party-List	301,291	0.76	1	0
Nanay Partylist	293,430	0.74	1	New
Kapuso PM	293,149	0.74	1	New
SSS-GSIS Pensyonado	290,359	0.73	1	New
DUMPER Partylist	279,532	0.71	1	0
Abang Lingkod	274,735	0.69	1	0
Pusong Pinoy	266,623	0.67	1	0
Swerte	261,379	0.66	1	New
Philreca Party-List	261,045	0.66	1	0
Gabriela Women's Party (Note: Proclaimed as winner on September 17, 2025 by virtue of the COMELEC declaring a 64th seat being up)	256,811	0.65	1	0
Abono Partylist (Note: Proclaimed as winner on October 2, 2025 by virtue of Duterte Youth's disqualification)	254,474	0.64	1	0
Ang Probinsyano Party-list	250,886	0.63	1	0
Murang Kuryente Partylist	247,754	0.63	1	New
OFW Partylist	246,609	0.62	0	−1
Apat-Dapat	245,060	0.62	0	0
Tupad	243,152	0.61	0	0
Kalinga Partylist	235,186	0.59	0	0
1-Pacman Party List	233,096	0.59	0	−1
ANGAT Partylist	229,707	0.58	0	−1
Magsasaka Partylist	225,371	0.57	0	−1
P3PWD	214,605	0.54	0	−1
Barangay Health Wellness Partylist	203,719	0.51	0	−1
Democratic Independent Workers Association	195,829	0.49	0	0
Epanaw Sambayanan	188,505	0.48	0	0
Probinsyano Ako	185,606	0.47	0	−1
Toda Aksyon	183,111	0.46	0	0
Pinuno Partylist	181,066	0.46	0	−1
Serbisyo sa Bayan Party	175,520	0.44	0	0
Abante Pangasinan-Ilokano Party	170,795	0.43	0	−1
AGRI Partylist	168,032	0.42	0	−1
Asap Na	164,030	0.41	0	0
Bayan Muna	162,894	0.41	0	0
Eduaksyon	161,517	0.41	0	0
Akay ni Sol	159,748	0.40	0	0
Ahon Mahirap	157,991	0.40	0	0
1Munti Partylist	157,665	0.40	0	0
H.E.L.P. Pilipinas	157,308	0.40	0	0
A Teacher Partylist	157,116	0.40	0	0
Babae Ako	157,041	0.40	0	0
Anakalusugan	154,121	0.39	0	−1
Pilipinas Babangon Muli	154,025	0.39	0	0
Batang Quiapo Partylist	153,637	0.39	0	0
Lunas	151,494	0.38	0	0
Kabalikat ng Mamamayan	141,847	0.36	0	−1
WIFI	141,041	0.36	0	0
Aangat Tayo	140,597	0.35	0	0
Laang Kawal	136,484	0.34	0	0
Ako Padayon	134,292	0.34	0	0
Solo Parents	131,659	0.33	0	0
Pamilya Ko	124,228	0.31	0	0
Pamilyang Magsasaka	117,440	0.30	0	0
ANGKASANGGA	115,720	0.29	0	0
Kasambahay	111,269	0.28	0	0
Bangon Bagong Minero	111,174	0.28	0	0
Pamilya Muna	108,483	0.27	0	0
Kababaihan	107,848	0.27	0	0
AA-Kasosyo Party	107,262	0.27	0	0
Tulungan Tayo	106,504	0.27	0	0
Health Workers	105,512	0.27	0	0
1Agila	104,868	0.26	0	0
Boses Party-List	102,588	0.26	0	0
Buhay Party-List	99,365	0.25	0	0
Ipatupad For Workers	96,735	0.24	0	0
Gilas	96,646	0.24	0	0
Bunyog Party	93,825	0.24	0	0
Vendors Partylist	88,845	0.22	0	0
Bayaning Tsuper	84,204	0.21	0	0
Bisaya Gyud Party-List	79,915	0.20	0	0
Magdalo Party-List	78,984	0.20	0	0
Maharlikang Pilipino Party	78,700	0.20	0	0
Arangkada Pilipino	75,493	0.19	0	0
Bagong Maunlad na Pilipinas	70,595	0.18	0	0
Damayang Filipino	68,480	0.17	0	0
Partido sa Bagong Pilipino	68,085	0.17	0	0
Heal PH	67,085	0.17	0	0
Ang Tinig ng Seniors	66,553	0.17	0	0
Ako OFW	60,230	0.15	0	0
Aksyon Dapat	58,916	0.15	0	0
Aktibong Kaagapay	55,829	0.14	0	0
UGB Partylist	53,633	0.14	0	0
Ang Komadrona	53,017	0.13	0	0
United Frontliners	52,338	0.13	0	0
Gabay	52,109	0.13	0	0
Tictok	51,354	0.13	0	0
Ako Tanod	49,553	0.13	0	0
Barangay Natin	49,364	0.12	0	0
Abante Bisdak	49,114	0.12	0	0
Turismo	47,645	0.12	0	0
Ang Bumbero ng Pilipinas	47,027	0.12	0	0
BFF	45,816	0.12	0	0
Pinoy Ako	44,419	0.11	0	0
Patrol Partylist	41,570	0.10	0	−1
Tutok To Win Party-List	41,036	0.10	0	−1
Lingap	38,564	0.10	0	0
Maagap	35,871	0.09	0	0
PBA Partylist	35,078	0.09	0	−1
Ilocano Defenders	32,028	0.08	0	0
Pamana	31,526	0.08	0	0
Kaunlad Pinoy	30,898	0.08	0	0
Juan Pinoy	27,523	0.07	0	0
Rebolusyonaryong Alyansang Makabansa	26,771	0.07	0	0
Arise	26,565	0.07	0	0
Click Party	25,914	0.07	0	0
MPBL Partylist	23,189	0.06	0	0
PROMDI	23,144	0.06	0	0
Bida Katagumpay	20,885	0.05	0	0
Hugpong Federal	19,028	0.05	0	0
Arte	14,169	0.04	0	0
Peoples Champ Guardians Partylist	11,492	0.03	0	0
Sulong Dignidad	8,120	0.02	0	0
Total	39,611,775	100.00	64	+1
Valid votes	39,611,775	69.07	+3.62	
Invalid/blank votes (Note: Includes 2,338,564 votes for Duterte Youth, which the Commission on Elections (COMELEC) second division cancelled its registration on June 18, 2025, which was later affirmed by the COMELEC en banc, thereby preventing all of its nominees from assuming their seats. The COMELEC then proclaimed three party-lists with one seat each as winners.)	17,739,183	30.93	−3.62	
Total votes	57,350,958	100.00	–	
Registered voters/turnout	69,673,655	82.31	−0.67	
Source: COMELEC (vote totals)

Vote share
Akbayan	7.02%
Tingog	4.60%
4Ps	3.71%
ACT-CIS	3.13%
Ako Bikol	2.71%
Others	78.83%

Party-list seats
Akbayan	4.76%
Duterte Youth	4.76%
Tingog	4.76%
4Ps	3.17%
ACT-CIS	3.17%
Ako Bikol	3.17%
Others	76.21%

== Defeated incumbents ==
=== Elections in districts ===
These include incumbents who ran and lost while running within a congressional district.

1. Aklan–2nd: Teodorico Haresco Jr. (Nacionalista)
2. Albay–3rd: Fernando Cabredo (NUP)
3. Batangas–1st: Eric Buhain (Nacionalista)
4. Bohol–1st: Edgar Chatto (NUP)
5. Caloocan–2nd: Mitch Cajayon-Uy (Lakas)
6. Cebu–4th: Janice Salimbangon (NUP)
7. Cotabato–1st: Joel Sacdalan (NPC)
8. Dinagat Islands: Alan Ecleo (Lakas)
9. Eastern Samar: Maria Fe Abunda (Lakas)
10. General Santos: Loreto Acharon (NPC)
11. Maguindanao del Sur: Tong Paglas (Lakas)
12. Misamis Oriental–1st: Christian Unabia (Lakas)
13. Parañaque–2nd: Gustavo Tambunting (NUP)
14. Quezon City–4th: Marvin Rillo (Lakas)
15. Rizal–4th: Fidel Nograles (Lakas)
16. South Cotabato–2nd: Peter Miguel (Lakas)
17. Taguig–2nd: Pammy Zamora (Lakas)
18. Zamboanga Sibugay–1st: Wilter Palma (Lakas)
19. Zamboanga Sibugay–2nd: Antonieta Eudela (Lakas)

The following were incumbent party-list representatives, but ran in congressional districts and lost:

1. Jil Bongalon (Ako Bicol)
  Ran as Lakas candidate in Albay–1st and lost.
2. Jorge Antonio Bustos (PATROL)
  Ran as an independent candidate in Pampanga–4th and lost.
3. Migs Nograles (PBA)
  Ran as an independent candidate in Davao City–1st and lost.

=== Party-list election ===
These include incumbents who have not been elected in the party-list election, either because their party lost all seats, or lost enough seats, including the incumbent's own.

1. Angelica Natasha Co (BHW)
2. Lex Anthony Colada (AAMBIS-Owa)
  Ran as nominee of Angkasangga and lost
3. Rudys Caesar Fariñas (Probinsyano Ako)
4. Anthony Golez (Malasakit at Bayanihan)
  Ran as nominee of TICTOK and lost
5. Marissa Magsino (OFW)
6. Jose Gay Padiernos (GP)
7. Ray T. Reyes (Anakalusugan)
8. Ron Salo (KABAYAN)

In addition, Yedda Romualdez (Tingog) was its #6 nominee, and would not have won a seat unless third to the fifth nominees declined. The nominees did renounce the nominations, paving the way for Romualdez's affirmation of her election.

== Speakership election ==
Allies of outgoing speaker Martin Romualdez are thought to back him to be reelected, and are also thought to have the numbers to keep him on that position. Toby Tiangco, the campaign manager of Alyansa para sa Bagong Pilipinas senatorial ticket, said that the House's last-minute impeachment of Sara Duterte hurt the chances of the administration ticket from winning more seats in the Senate election. He also floated his name as a potential candidate for House speaker. When asked about this, he said "I will do whatever is best for the President. If its best for the President that Martin Romualdez remains Speaker, I will support what he thinks is best for him." Jude Acidre, a close Romualdez ally, belied Tiangco's pronouncements, saying 100 out 115 lawmakers who voted for impeachment defended their seats. including 36 out of 44 pro-impeachment lawmakers in Mindanao. After a meeting on May 16, David Suarez, with around 240 congressmen have signed the manifesto supporting Romualdez, he said that "It's over. The Speaker has the numbers.

In a separate TV interview, Tiangco revealed that Sandro Marcos, the president's son, got caught up in voting for Duterte's impeachment. Tiangco declined to share details, as he said that Marcos did not initiate what happened and to just leave him out of it. Marcos, when earlier interviewed on February, did not sound coerced when asked on why he was the first person to sign off on the impeachment.

Meanwhile, Sara Duterte said she had asked her brother Paolo to run for speaker; if he loses, he can be minority floor leader instead. The vice president said she was not approached by anyone to be her candidate for speaker or for the Senate presidency. Other possible candidates include Albee Benitez, who first lady Liza Araneta Marcos is reportedly in favor of, and Angelo Marcos Barba. There were even reports of Sandro Marcos replacing Romualdez on its lame duck session, but ranking congressional leaders denied efforts to remove Romualdez from office. On May 26, Suarez said they have already secured formal declarations supporting Romualdez from 278 representatives, with a total of 285 expressing support.

On early June, Duke Frasco was expelled from the National Unity Party for refusing to support Romualdez for the speakership. Frasco then joined President Bongbong Marcos on his working visit to Japan to attend Expo 2025. This led to rumours that he is candidate for speaker. By late June, Frasco denied he was targeting the speakership, saying that he'd rather vote either for Tiangco or Benitez.

On the convening of the 20th Congress in late July, Romualdez was reelected speaker, with 269 voting for him, and 34 abstentions. Suarez nominated Romualdez, who was seconded by Sandro Marcos. Benitez, Frasco and Tiangco all abstained from voting. The three Duterte congressmen walked out during the election without voting. Benitez said that he, Frasco and Tiangco were planning to form an independent bloc in the House, outside the majority and minority blocs. Marcelino Libanan was then unanimously elected by the minority as their floor leader.
