= Pusong Pinoy =

Political party from the Philippines

- — Philippine partylist —
- Colors: Green, Sky blue

Current representation (20th Congress)
- Seats in the House of Representatives: 1 / 3 (Out of 63 party-list seats)
- Representative(s): Jernie Jett Nisay

Pusong Pinoy (lit. 'Heart of Filipinos') is an organization based in Bataan with party-list representation in the House of Representatives of the Philippines.

== History ==
Pusong Pinoy was an organization specifically formed as a party-list. Then first nominee Jett Nisay said that their group was motivated to form the group after the office of Congressman Joet Garcia of Bataan's 2nd district received an influx of people seeking medical assistance during the COVID-19 pandemic. Garcia's office sought other agencies as well as the offices of Senator Bong Go and then President Rodrigo Duterte to fulfill those needs. Nisay himself was a city councilor for Balanga.

Pusong Pinoy won a seat in the 2022 election which was filled by Nisay. The group will take part in the 2025 election.

== Electoral results ==
Election	Votes	%	Secured Seats	Party-List Seat	Congress	Representative
2022	262,044	0.71%	1 / 3	63	19th Congress; 2022–2025	Jernie Jett Nisay
2025	266,623	0.64%	1 / 3	63	20th Congress; 2025–2028	Jernie Jett Nisay
Note: A party-list representation in the House of Representatives of the Philippines, can win a maximum of three seats in the House of Representatives.
