= Philreca Party-List =

Political party in the Philippines

Philreca
- — Philippine partylist —
- Full name: Philippine Rural Electric Cooperatives Association Inc.
- Colors: Red

Current representation (20th Congress)
- Seats in the House of Representatives: 1 / 3 (Out of 63 party-list seats)
- Representative(s): Presley De Jesus

Philippine Rural Electric Cooperatives Association Inc. (Philreca) Party-List is a political organization of the Philippine Rural Electric Cooperatives Association which has party-list representation in the House of Representatives of the Philippines. It represents the interest of Philreca's member electricity cooperatives and its consumers.

It also advocates the sustainability of the rural electrification program, as well as lowering the price of electricity, and the improvement of electricity distribution and service.

They participated in the 2019 Philippine elections, where they secured a single seat in the House of Representatives. The seat was filled in by Philreca's President Presley De Jesus.

In May 2021, Presidential Anti-Corruption Commission (PACC) Chairman Greco B. Belgica alleged that electric cooperatives funded Philreca Party-List' 2019 electoral bid adding that "law does not allow public utilities to contribute funds to campaigns of a candidate or a party-list, or use government funds to do so". Philreca representative Presley De Jesus denied such claim saying that the partylist did not receive political contributions from any electric cooperative while also noting that cooperatives are not government organizations and are non-profit bodies supervised by the National Electric Administration

== Electoral results ==
Election	Votes	%	Secured Seats	Party-List Seats	Congress	Representative
2019	394,966	1.42%	1 / 3	61	18th Congress; 2019–2022	Presley De Jesus
2022	243,487	0.66%	1 / 3	63	19th Congress; 2022–2025	Presley De Jesus
2025	261,045	0.62%	1 / 3	64	20th Congress; 2025–2028	Presley De Jesus
Note: For party-list representation in the House of Representatives of the Philippines, a party can win a maximum of three seats.
