= Caroline Agyao =

Filipino politician

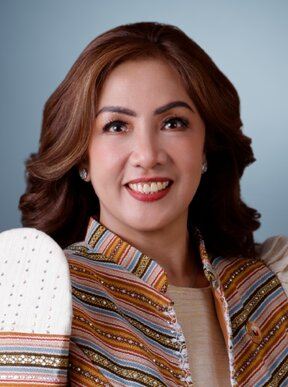
- Official portrait, 2025

Member of the Philippine House of Representatives from Kalinga's at-large district
- Incumbent
- Assumed office June 30, 2025
- Preceded by: Allen Jesse C. Mangaoang

Personal details
- Born: Tabuk, Kalinga
- Party: PFP (2024–present)
- Spouse: Allen Jesse Mangaoang

Caroline Batalad Agyao is a Filipino physician and politician who serves as the representative of Kalinga since 2025.

She was elected to represent Kalinga in the House of Representatives in the 2025 House of Representatives elections.

== See also ==
- List of female members of the House of Representatives of the Philippines
