= Manila Teachers Party-List =

Political party in the Philippines

Manila Teachers
- — Philippine partylist —
- Full name: Manila Teachers Savings and Loan Association
- Sector(s) represented: Youth

Current representation (20th Congress)
- Seats in the House of Representatives: 1 / 3 (Out of 63 party-list seats)
- Representative(s): Maria Francesca Lacson

The Manila Teachers Savings and Loan Association is a Filipino political party and associated financial lending organization that holds party-list representation in the House of Representatives of the Philippines.

Outside its role in the Congress, it also offers salary loans to public schools teachers.

The Manila Teachers Partylist names the youth as the sector it represents and with the added goal to "ensure safe communities for conducive learning and promote national and cultural heritage".

== Electoral history ==
Manila Teachers won its first seat in the House of Representatives as a party-list group following the 2016 election. The group's seat for the 17th Congress was filled by Virgilio Lacson.

They were able to retain their seat for the 18th and 19th Congress, after securing sufficient votes in the 2019 and 2022 elections. Lacson likewise reprised his role as Manila Teacher's representatives for both Congresses.

== Electoral history ==
Election	Votes	%	Seats
2016	268,613	0.83	1 / 59
2019	249,416	0.89	1 / 61
2022	249,525	0.68	1 / 63
2025	301,291	0.72	1 / 63

== Representatives to Congress ==
Period	Representative
17th Congress; 2016–2019	Virgilio Lacson
18th Congress; 2019–2022	Virgilio Lacson
19th Congress; 2022–2025	Virgilio Lacson
20th Congress; 2025–2028	Maria Nina Francesca Lacson
Note: A party-list group, can win a maximum of three seats in the House of Representatives.

== Operations as a loan agency ==
The Manila Teachers Partylist also ran as a loan agency under the name Manila Teachers Savings and Loan Association, Inc. (MTSLAI). It offered salary loans to member public school teachers through its Manila Teachers' Mutual Aid System Inc. (MTMAS). The Department of Education revoked its accreditation in 2023 citing an order from the Bangko Sentral ng Pilipinas, the Philippines' central bank.
