= Kalinga Partylist =

Philippines political party

Kalinga
- — Philippine partylist —
- Full name: Kalinga-Advocacy For Social Empowerment and Nation Building Through Easing Poverty, Inc.
- Colors: Purple, Pink

Current representation (19th Congress)
- Seats in the House of Representatives: 1 / 3 (Out of 63 party-list seats)
- Representative(s): Irene Gay Saulog

Website
- kalingapartylist.org.ph

The Kalinga-Advocacy For Social Empowerment and Nation Building Through Easing Poverty, Inc. also known as simply as the Kalinga Partylist is an organization with party-list representation in the House of Representatives of the Philippines.

== Background ==
Kalinga Partylist is endorsed by the Pentecostal Missionary Church of Christ (4th Watch). Kalinga is represented by Irene Gay "Khate" Ferriol Saulog, an educator who was the daughter of former PMCC chief executive minister Arsenio Ferriol.

Kalinga first won a seat in the 2010 election which was filled in by Abigail Ferriol.

Saulog has been Kalinga's representative since the 2019 elections.

== Electoral results ==
Election	Votes	%	Secured seats	Party-list seats	Congress	Representative
2010	230,516	0.77%	1 / 3	57	15th Congress; 2010–2013	Abigail Ferriol
2013	372,383	1.34%	1 / 3	59	16th Congress; 2013–2016	Abigail Ferriol
2016	494,725	1.53%	1 / 3	59	17th Congress; 2016–2019	Abigail Ferriol
2019	339,665	1.22%	1 / 3	61	18th Congress; 2019–2022	Irene Gay Saulog
2022	374,308	1.02%	1 / 3	63	19th Congress; 2022–2025	Irene Gay Saulog
2025	235,186	0.56%	0 / 3	63	20th Congress; 2025–2028	Failed to secure representation
Note: For party-list representation in the House of Representatives of the Philippines, a party can win a maximum of three seats.
