= Probinsyano Ako =

Political party in the Philippines

- — Philippine partylist —
- Sector(s) represented: Rural
- Colors: Green

Current representation (19th Congress)
- Seats in the House of Representatives: 0 / 3 (Out of 63 party-list seats)
- Representative(s): Rudys Caesar Fariñas

The Probinsyano Ako (lit. 'I an from the province') Party-List is a political organization which has party-list representation in the House of Representatives of the Philippines. It focuses in the rural sector. It participated in the 2019, 2022, and the 2025 Philippine party-list elections.

== Ideology ==
Probinsyano Ako focuses in the rural sector. According to The Philippine Star, their goal is to lift to general welfare for people living in rural areas in the country.

== History ==
They participated in the 2019 Philippine elections, where they secured two seats in the House of Representatives. The seats were filled by Rudys Fariñas and Lira Fuster-Fariñas who are members of the Fariñas political family of Ilocos Norte. Lira Fuster Fariñas used to be the second nominee, but she was substituted by Jose "Bonito" Singson Jr. just before the May 13, 2019, election.

In the 2022 Philippine House of Representatives elections, they gained 18th place with 469,386 votes, gaining 1.30 percent of the votes. 50 percent of the votes in La Union were gained by the party. It also gained 41 percent of the votes in Ilocos Norte. Probinsyano Ako gained number 28 in the ballot. The partylist gained 70th place with 250,555 votes, 0.60 percent of the votes. In the raffle for the gaining of seats, Probinsyano Ako was deemed unlikely to get a seat.

== Electoral history ==
Election	Votes	%	Seats
2019	630,435	2.26	2
2022	471,904	1.28	1
2025	185,606	0.44	0

== Representation in the Congress ==
Period	1st Representative	2nd Representative
18th Congress; 2019–2022	Rudys Caesar Fariñas	Jose Crisologo Singson Jr.
19th Congress; 2022–2025	Rudys Caesar Fariñas	—N/a
Note: A party-list group, can win a maximum of three seats in the House of Representatives.
