= Magsasaka Partylist =

Political party in the Philippines

Magsasaka
- — Philippine partylist —
- Full name: Magkakasama sa Sakahan, Kaunlaran
- Sector(s) represented: Agriculture

Magsasaka (lit. 'Farmer') Partylist, also known as Magkakasama sa Sakahan, Kaunlaran (lit. 'Association of Farmers for Progress'), is a political organization which had party-list representation in the House of Representatives of the Philippines. It aims to represent the interest of Filipino farmers. Peasant rights watchdog Tanggol Magsasaka included Magsasaka on its list of party-list groups that "exploit the struggles and aspirations of farmers." One of its nominees, Debold Sinas, has been linked to massacres and human rights abuses.

== History ==
=== 18th Congress ===
The Magsasaka Partylist took part at the 2019 House of Representatives elections and won a lone seat for the 18th Congress. This seat was filled by Argel Cabatbat, a lawyer and a son of farmers from Guimba, Nueva Ecija.

In June 2019, the chair Soliman Villamin Jr. was expelled from Magsasaka partylist, which the leader's faction described as "unceremonious" and illegal.

As party-list representative, Cabatbat co-authored a bill in Congress proposing the establishment of a Department of Water Resources to address mismanagement of water resources for irrigation and to assure that ground and surface water to be free from pollution. In January 2022, Cabatbat expressed opposition to the Department of Agriculture's administrative order allowing the importation of 60,000 metric tons of pelagic fish amid an alleged national fish shortage.

=== 19th Congress ===
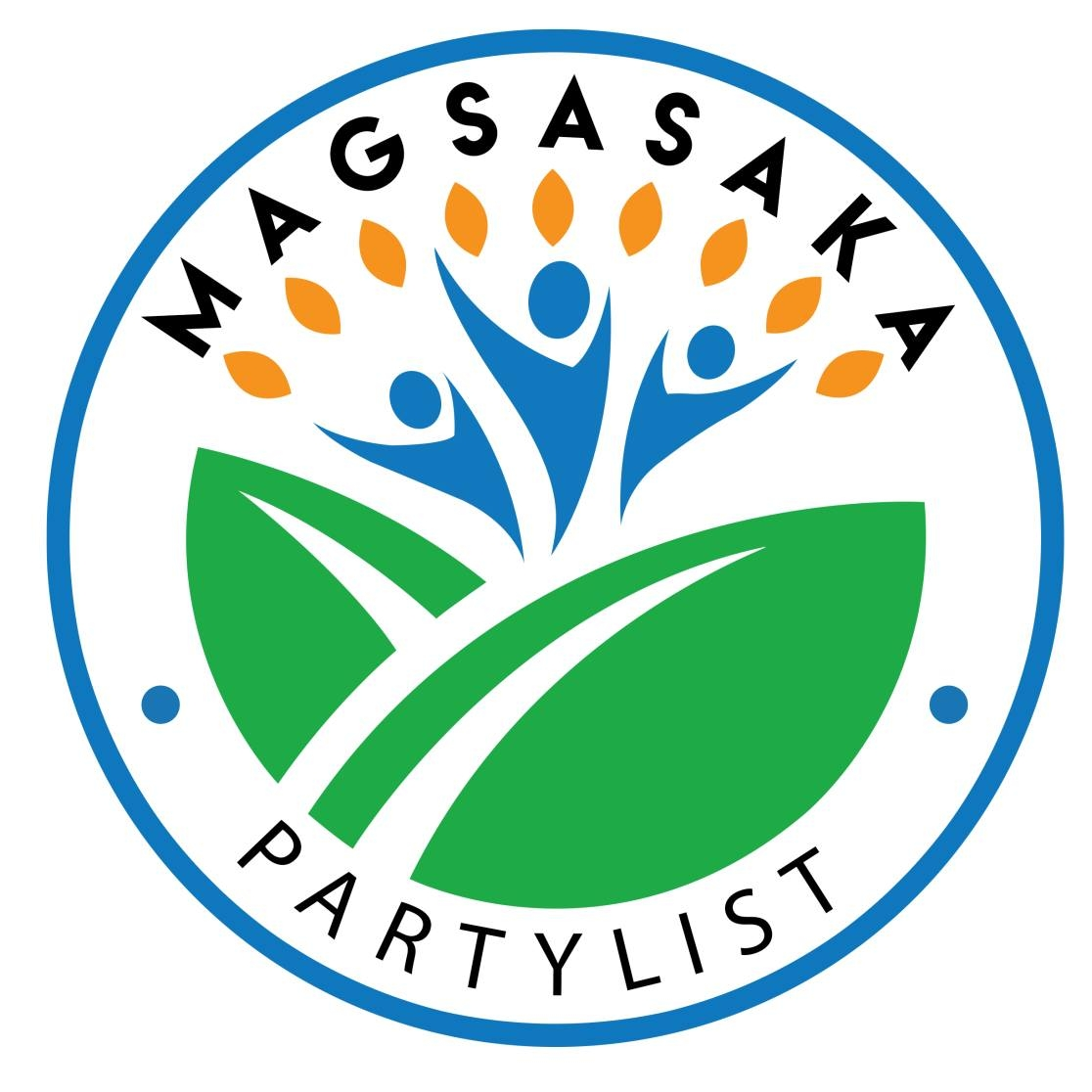
Logo of Magsasaka Partylist under the original logo submitted to COMELEC.

Magsasaka party-list was one of the 55 groups the Commission on Elections (Comelec) proclaimed as winners in the May 2022 elections with 272,737 votes, good for one seat in the House of Representatives. However its internal dispute which started in June 2019 prevented it to be filled.

Villamin's faction nominated King Cortez, Villamin himself and Robert Gerard Nazal Jr. for their organization. The first and second withdrew their nomination. Argel Cabatbat disputed Nazal's legitimacy to fill in the seat, claiming that Nazal is not a member of the organization and therefore ineligible. He alleges that Nazal is the founder of party-list organization Pasahero, which lost in the 2022 elections. It is also claimed that Nazal is a nominee of the losing partylist Pasahero although Comelec records dispute this.

Comelec affirmed Nazal's nomination on October 10, 2022. Nazal took oath as Magsasaka representative on the same day. The election body three days later maintained that they stood by the proclamation despite the dispute which has reached the Supreme Court. Cabatbat's faction filed a case in the Supreme Court to reverse the election body's decision. The high court issued a notice on October 18, ordering for all involved parties to maintain the status quo and nullified Nazal's assumption of office. The Cabatbat faction condemned the rival faction's "sensational claims" and maintained that Villamin's faction has been disavowed by Comelec. Comelec on October 20 said that it would head to the high court's order, and for the meantime would refrain from issuing any document recognizing as the legitimate nominee of Magsasaka.

In December 2022, Nazal unveiled the partylist's Medium-Term Development Plan in a meeting with agriculture stakeholders in the Visayas. He pledged to file several measures tackling concerns of fisherfolks and farmers if the Supreme Court rules in favor of his group.

On August 15, 2024 the Supreme Court overruled the Comelec proclamation and recognized the validity of Villamin's expulsion from the party in 2019, effectively recognising Cabatbat as congressional representative.

On February 2, 2025, the partylist's third nominee, former Alex Boncayao Brigade member Lejun Dela Cruz, was injured following what the partylist said was an attempted abduction and assassination by police in Cainta, Rizal. The Philippine National Police said that it had tried to arrest dela Cruz as part of a warrant issued against him on murder charges. The charges against him were dismissed on March 24, 2025, after a court in Las Piñas granted a demurrer to evidence.

== Electoral history ==
Election	Votes	%	Seats
2019	496,337	1.78	1
2022	276,889	0.75	1
2025	225,371	0.54	0

== Representatives to Congress ==
Period	Representative
18th Congress; 2019–2022	Argel Joseph Cabatbat
19th Congress; 2022–2025	Argel Joseph Cabatbat (SC status quo; unseated)
19th Congress; 2022–2025	Robert Nazal (Comelec; 2022–2024)
