= 2025 Philippine House of Representatives party-list election =

- May 12, 2025
- Part of the 2025 Philippine House of Representatives elections
Party	Vote %	Seats	+/–
Akbayan	7.02	3	+2
Tingog	4.60	3	+1
4Ps	3.71	2	0
ACT-CIS	3.13	2	−1
Ako Bicol	2.71	2	0
Others	53.00	52	+6
This lists parties that won seats. See the complete results below.

Elections for the party-list seats in the Philippine House of Representatives were held on May 12, 2025, as part of the 2025 Philippine general election. Under the 1987 Constitution, party-list representatives may comprise up to 20% of the total membership of the House of Representatives.

The election was conducted under the party-list system as interpreted by the Supreme Court in BANAT v. Commission on Elections (COMELEC). Seats were allocated using the Hare quota, with a 2% vote threshold for the allocation of additional seats. No party was allowed to win more than three seats. If the initial allocation did not meet the constitutional requirement of 20% of the House membership reserved for party-list representatives, the remaining seats were distributed one each to the highest-ranked parties that had not yet won a seat until the allocation was complete.

Akbayan and Tingog, which initially placed first and third, respectively, each won the maximum of three seats allowed under the law. The Duterte Youth party-list, placing second, was later disqualified by COMELEC in October 2025, resulting in the redistribution of its three seats to Abono, Ang Probinsyano, and Murang Kuryente. 4Ps, ACT-CIS, and Ako Bicol each won two seats, while 49 other parties won one seat each, for an initial total of 63 seats. A 64th seat was added in September 2025 after COMELEC's review that the 63 seats initially allocated comprised only 19.8% of the total membership of the House. Gabriela was subsequently proclaimed to fill the additional seat.

11 incumbent party-lists lost representation in the House, while 14 parties gained representation.

== Contesting parties ==
A total of 156 party-lists participated in the election.

No.	Party-list	Current seats (19th Congress)	New party? (Note: If participating in its first election.)	Last election contested	No.	Party-list	Current seats (19th Congress)	New party?	Last election contested
1	Pagtibayin at Palaguin ang Pangkabuhayang Pilipino (4Ps)	2	No	2022	79	Kalinga-Advocacy for Social Empowerment and Nation Building Through Easing Poverty (Kalinga)	1	No	2022
2	Puwersa ng Pilipinong Pandagat (PPP)	—N/a	Yes	—N/a	80	Mothers for Change (MOCHA)	—N/a	No	2022
3	FPJ Panday Bayanihan	—N/a	Yes	—N/a	81	Arangkada Pilipino	—N/a	Yes	—N/a
4	Kabataan	1	No	2022	82	Aangat Tayo	—N/a	No	2019
5	Duty to Energize the Republic through the Enlightenment of the Youth Sectoral Party-list Organization (Duterte Youth)	1	No	2022	83	One Filipinos Worldwide (OFW)	1	No	2022
6	Mamamayang Liberal (ML)	—N/a	Yes	—N/a	84	Bayan Itayo Ang Dangal ng Agrikultura Kasama sa Tagumpay (BIDA Katagumpay)	—N/a	Yes	—N/a
7	Pilipinas Babangon Muli (PBBM)	—N/a	Yes	—N/a	85	Kampihan ng mga Maralita at Manggagawa (Kamanggagawa)	—N/a	Yes	—N/a
8	Komunidad ng Pamilya Pasyente at Persons with Disabilities (P3PWD)	Vacant	No	2022	86	Balikatan of Filipino Families (BFF)	—N/a	Yes	—N/a
9	Murang Kuryente	—N/a	No	2019	87	Bunyog	—N/a	No	2022
10	Bicol Saro	1	No	2022	88	AGRI	1	No	2022
11	Ipatupad for Workers (Ipatupad)	—N/a	No	2022	89	Coalition of Associations of Senior Citizens in the Philippines (Senior Citizens)	1	No	2022
12	Public Safety Alliance for Transformation and Rule of Law (Patrol)	1	No	2022	90	Kababaihan Kabalikatan para sa Kapakanan at Kaunlaran ng Bayan (4K)	—N/a	Yes	—N/a
13	Juan - Pinagkaisang Ordinaryong Mamamayan Para Yumabong (Juan Pinoy)	—N/a	Yes	—N/a	91	Partido sa Bagong Pilipino (PBP)	—N/a	Yes	—N/a
14	Advocates for Retail, Fashion, Textile, Tradition, Events and Creative Services Sector (ARTE)	—N/a	No	2022	92	Aurora Integrated Multi-Purpose Cooperative (One Coop)	—N/a	No	2022
15	Walang Iwanan sa Free Internet (WIFI)	—N/a	No	2022	93	Citizens' Battle Against Corruption (CIBAC)	—N/a	No	2022
16	Movement of Active Apostolic Guardians Association of the Philippines (Maagap)	—N/a	No	2022	94	Bagong Henerasyon (BH)	—N/a	No	2022
17	United Senior Citizens Koalition ng Pilipinas (United Senior Citizens)	—N/a	No	2022	95	1 Agila-Alalayang Agila para sa Bayan (1Agila)	—N/a	Yes	—N/a
18	Mindanao Indigenous Peoples Conference for Peace and Development (Epanaw Sambayanan)	—N/a	No	2022	96	EduAKsyon	—N/a	Yes	—N/a
19	Ako Padayon Pilipino (Ako Padayon)	—N/a	No	2022	97	Ang Tinig ng Senior Citizens sa Filipinas (Ang Tinig ng Senior Citizens)	—N/a	No	2022
20	Trade Union Congress Party (TUCP)	1	No	2022	98	Bisaya Gyud	—N/a	No	2022
21	Alliance of Concerned Teachers (ACT Teachers)	1	No	2022	99	Pinoy Ako	—N/a	Yes	—N/a
22	One Patriotic Coalition of Marginalized Nationals (1-Pacman)	1	No	2022	100	Health, Education, Livelihood Program of the Philippines (H.E.L.P. Pilipinas)	—N/a	No	2022
23	Talino at Galing ng Pinoy (TGP)	1	No	2022	101	Health Workers	—N/a	Yes	—N/a
24	Drivers United for Mass Progress and Equal Rights – Philippines Taxi Drivers Association (DUMPER PTDA)	1	No	2022	102	Peoples Champ Guardians	—N/a	No	2019
25	Alagaan Natin Ating Kalusugan (Anakalusugan)	1	No	2022	103	Kasosyo Producer-Consumer Exchange Association (AA-Kasosyo)	—N/a	No	2019
26	Aksyon Dapat	—N/a	Yes	—N/a	104	Solidarity of Northern Luzon People (Solid North)	—N/a	Yes	—N/a
27	Barangay Health Wellness (BHW)	1	No	2022	105	Abante Mindanao (Abamin)	—N/a	No	2019
28	Sulong Dignidad	—N/a	No	2019	106	Tagapagtaguyod ng mga Reporma at Adhikaing Babalikat at Hahango sa mga Oportunidad para sa mga Pilipino (Trabaho)	—N/a	No	2022
29	Sulong mga Batang Quiapo (Batang Quiapo)	—N/a	Yes	—N/a	107	Ang Kasangga ng Mangunguma-Owa Mangunguma (ANGKASangga)	—N/a	Yes	—N/a
30	Puwersa ng Bayaning Atleta (PBA)	1	No	2022	108	Towards Development and Action (TODA Aksyon)	—N/a	No	2022
31	Generasyong Iniaalay Lagi ang Sarili (GILAS)	—N/a	Yes	—N/a	109	Turismo Isulong Mo (Turismo)	—N/a	No	2022
32	Ako Ilocano Ako	1	No	2022	110	Abono	1	No	2022
33	Pamilyang Magsasaka	—N/a	No	2022	111	Alyansa Laban sa Substance Abuse para sa Bagong Pilipinas Natin (ASAP NA)	—N/a	Yes	—N/a
34	Computer, Literacy, Innovation, Connectivity & Knowledge (CLICK)	—N/a	No	2022	112	Liga ng Nagkakaisang Mahihirap (LINGAP)	—N/a	Yes	—N/a
35	Abante Bisdak	—N/a	Yes	—N/a	113	United Frontliners of the Philippines (United Frontliners)	—N/a	No	2022
36	Manila Teachers' Savings and Loan Association (Manila Teachers)	1	No	2022	114	Kasambahay Tayo (Kasambahay)	—N/a	Yes	—N/a
37	Ibalik ang Kulturang Pamana Movement (Pamana)	—N/a	Yes	—N/a	115	Tutok to Win	1	No	2022
38	Nanay	—N/a	Yes	—N/a	116	Advocates & Keepers Organization of OFW (Ako-OFW)	—N/a	No	2022
39	Kilos Mamamayan Ngayon Na (KM Ngayon Na)	—N/a	No	2022	117	Agricultural Sector Alliance of the Philippines (AGAP)	1	No	2022
40	Babae Ako para sa Bayan (Babae Ako)	—N/a	No	2022	118	1Tahanan	—N/a	No	2022
41	Alliance for Resilience, Sustainability, and Empowerment (ARISE)	—N/a	No	2022	119	Cooperative NATCCO (Coop-NATCCO)	1	No	2022
42	Kabalikat ng Mamamayan (Kabayan)	1	No	2022	120	Magdalo Para sa Pilipino Sectoral Party Organization (Magdalo Party-List)	—N/a	No	2022
43	Association of Philippine Electric Cooperatives (APEC)	1	No	2022	121	1Munti	—N/a	Yes	—N/a
44	Mamamayan para sa Gobyernong Bubuklod sa mga Isip at Diwa ng mga Pilipino (Magbubukid)	—N/a	Yes	—N/a	122	People Working for the Development of the Philippines (Pinoy Workers)	—N/a	Yes	—N/a
45	SSS-GSIS Pensyonado	—N/a	Yes	—N/a	123	Abante Pangasinan-Ilokano Party (API)	1	No	2022
46	Gabriela Women's Party (Gabriela)	1	No	2022	124	Ako Bisaya	1	No	2022
47	Tingog Sinirangan (Tingog)	2	No	2022	125	Kamalayan ng Maralita at Malayang Mamamayan (Kamalayan)	—N/a	No	2022
48	Apat-Dapat	—N/a	No	2022	126	Ako Tanod	—N/a	Yes	—N/a
49	Ahon Mahirap	—N/a	Yes	—N/a	127	Probinsyano Ako	1	No	2022
50	Unyon ng mga Gabay ng Bayan (UGB)	—N/a	Yes	—N/a	128	Hanay ng mga Kababaihan at Kanilang mga Kasangga sa Lipunan (Kababaihan)	—N/a	Yes	—N/a
51	Akbayan Citizens' Action Party (Akbayan)	1	No	2022	129	Rebolusyonaryong Alyansang Makabansa (RAM)	—N/a	No	2022
52	Agimat ng Masa (Agimat)	1	No	2022	130	Alliance of Organizations, Networks and Associations of the Philippines (ALONA)	1	No	2022
53	Philippine Rural Electric Cooperatives Association (PhilRECA)	1	No	2022	131	Ako Bicol	2	No	2022
54	Kabalikat Patungo sa Umuunlad na Sistematiko at Organisadong Pangkabuhayan (Kapuso PM)	—N/a	No	2022	132	Galing sa Puso (GP)	1	No	2022
55	Ilocano Defenders	—N/a	Yes	—N/a	133	Kaisipang Positibo para sa Kaunlaran ng Pilipino (Kaunlad Pinoy)	—N/a	Yes	—N/a
56	1-Rider	2	No	2022	134	Ang Bumbero ng Pilipinas (ABP)	—N/a	No	2022
57	Tulong Ipamahagi sa Communidad Tungo Onsa Kaunlaran (TICTOK)	—N/a	Yes	—N/a	135	Construction Workers Solidarity (CWS)	1	No	2022
58	Partido Trabaho at Wage Hike (Wage Hike) (Note: The Wage Hike party-list withdrew from the election in December 2024, with its ballot number skipped from subsequently reprinted ballots.)	—N/a	Yes	—N/a	136	LPG Marketers Association (LPGMA)	1	No	2022
59	Bayan Muna	—N/a	No	2022	137	Advocacy for Teacher Empowerment Through Action, Cooperation and Harmony Towards Educational Reforms (A Teacher)	—N/a	No	2022
60	Ang Probinsyano	1	No	2022	138	Solo Parent Working for Economic Rights and Other Thrusts for Equality (Swerte)	—N/a	Yes	—N/a
61	Barkadahan para sa Bansa (Barkadahan)	—N/a	No	2022	139	Gabay Ugnayan para sa Reporma at Oportunidad (Gabay)	—N/a	Yes	—N/a
62	Serbisyo sa Bayan Party (SBP)	—N/a	No	—N/a	140	Malasakit at Bayanihan	—N/a	No	2022
63	Buhay Hayaan Yumabong (Buhay)	—N/a	No	2022	141	Akay ni Sol	—N/a	Yes	—N/a
64	Tulungan Tayo	—N/a	No	2022	142	Lungsod Aasenso (Lunas)	—N/a	No	2022
65	SAGIP	1	No	2022	143	Democratic Independent Workers Association (DIWA)	—N/a	No	2022
66	Bayaning Tsuper (BTS Bayaning Tsuper)	—N/a	No	2022	144	Pinatatag na Ugnayan para sa mga Oportunidad sa Pabahay ng Masa (Pinuno)	1	No	2022
67	Vendors Samahan ng mga Maninindang Pilipino (Vendors)	—N/a	Yes	—N/a	145	Ang Pamilya Muna (Pamilya Muna)	—N/a	No	2022
68	ACT-CIS	3	No	2022	146	Bagong Maunlad na Pilipinas (Bagong Pilipinas)	—N/a	Yes	—N/a
69	Aktibong Kaagapay ng mga Manggagawa (Aktibong Kaagapay)	—N/a	No	2022	147	Hugpong Federal Movement of the Philippines (Hugpong Federal)	—N/a	No	2022
70	Asenso Pinoy	—N/a	No	2022	148	Tupad	—N/a	Yes	—N/a
71	Solo Parents	—N/a	Yes	—N/a	149	Laang Kawal ng Pilipinas (Laang Kawal)	—N/a	No	2019
72	Ang Komadrona	—N/a	No	2022	150	Pamilya Ko	—N/a	Yes	—N/a
73	Bangon Bagong Minero (BBM)	—N/a	Yes	—N/a	151	Abag-Promdi (PROMDI)	—N/a	No	2022
74	Pusong Pinoy	1	No	2022	152	Health Alliance PH (HEAL PH)	—N/a	Yes	—N/a
75	Kusug Tausug	1	No	2022	153	Abang Lingkod	1	No	2022
76	Damayang Filipino Movement (Damayang Filipino)	—N/a	Yes	—N/a	154	Magsasaka	1	No	2022
77	Maharlikang Pilipino sa Bagong Lipunan (MPBL)	—N/a	Yes	—N/a	155	Maharlikang Pilipino Party (Maharlika)	—N/a	No	2022
78	Agrikultura Ngayon Gawing Akma at Tama (ANGAT)	1	No	2022	156	Uswag Ilonggo	1	No	2022

=== Nominees ===
Each party-list submitted a list of ten nominees, five more than the number required in previous elections. No substitutions were allowed after the list had been filed, and no additional nominees could be added after a winning party-list had been proclaimed.

== Results ==
Party	Votes	%	Seats	+/–
Akbayan	2,779,621	7.02	3	+2
Tingog Party List	1,822,708	4.60	3	+1
4Ps Partylist	1,469,571	3.71	2	0
ACT-CIS Partylist	1,239,930	3.13	2	−1
Ako Bicol	1,073,119	2.71	2	0
Uswag Ilonggo	777,754	1.96	1	0
Solid North Party	765,322	1.93	1	New
Trabaho Partylist	709,283	1.79	1	+1
Citizens' Battle Against Corruption	593,911	1.50	1	0
Malasakit at Bayanihan	580,100	1.46	1	0
Senior Citizens Partylist	577,753	1.46	1	0
Puwersa ng Pilipinong Pandagat	575,762	1.45	1	New
Mamamayang Liberal	547,949	1.38	1	New
FPJ Panday Bayanihan	538,003	1.36	1	New
United Senior Citizens Partylist	533,913	1.35	1	0
4K Partylist	521,592	1.32	1	New
LPG Marketers Association	517,833	1.31	1	0
Coop-NATCCO	509,913	1.29	1	0
Ako Bisaya	477,796	1.21	1	0
Construction Workers Solidarity	477,517	1.21	1	0
Pinoy Workers Partylist	475,985	1.20	1	New
AGAP Partylist	469,412	1.19	1	0
Asenso Pinoy	423,133	1.07	1	+1
Agimat Partylist	420,813	1.06	1	0
TGP Partylist	407,922	1.03	1	0
SAGIP Partylist	405,297	1.02	1	−1
ALONA Partylist	393,684	0.99	1	0
1-Rider Partylist	385,700	0.97	1	−1
Kamanggagawa	382,657	0.97	1	New
Galing sa Puso Party	381,880	0.96	1	0
Kamalayan	381,437	0.96	1	+1
Bicol Saro	366,177	0.92	1	0
Kusug Tausug	365,916	0.92	1	0
Alliance of Concerned Teachers	353,631	0.89	1	0
One Coop	334,098	0.84	1	+1
KM Ngayon Na	324,405	0.82	1	+1
Abante Mindanao	320,349	0.81	1	New
Bagong Henerasyon	319,803	0.81	1	0
Trade Union Congress Party	314,814	0.79	1	0
Kabataan	312,344	0.79	1	0
APEC Partylist	310,427	0.78	1	0
Magbubukid	310,289	0.78	1	New
1Tahanan	309,761	0.78	1	+1
Ako Ilocano Ako	301,406	0.76	1	0
Manila Teachers Party-List	301,291	0.76	1	0
Nanay Partylist	293,430	0.74	1	New
Kapuso PM	293,149	0.74	1	New
SSS-GSIS Pensyonado	290,359	0.73	1	New
DUMPER Partylist	279,532	0.71	1	0
Abang Lingkod	274,735	0.69	1	0
Pusong Pinoy	266,623	0.67	1	0
Swerte	261,379	0.66	1	New
Philreca Party-List	261,045	0.66	1	0
Gabriela Women's Party (Note: Proclaimed as winner on September 17, 2025 by virtue of the COMELEC declaring a 64th seat being up)	256,811	0.65	1	0
Abono Partylist (Note: Proclaimed as winner on October 2, 2025 by virtue of Duterte Youth's disqualification)	254,474	0.64	1	0
Ang Probinsyano Party-list	250,886	0.63	1	0
Murang Kuryente Partylist	247,754	0.63	1	New
OFW Partylist	246,609	0.62	0	−1
Apat-Dapat	245,060	0.62	0	0
Tupad	243,152	0.61	0	0
Kalinga Partylist	235,186	0.59	0	−1
1-Pacman Party List	233,096	0.59	0	−1
ANGAT Partylist	229,707	0.58	0	−1
Magsasaka Partylist	225,371	0.57	0	−1
P3PWD	214,605	0.54	0	−1
Barangay Health Wellness Partylist	203,719	0.51	0	−1
Democratic Independent Workers Association	195,829	0.49	0	0
Epanaw Sambayanan	188,505	0.48	0	0
Probinsyano Ako	185,606	0.47	0	−1
Toda Aksyon	183,111	0.46	0	0
Pinuno Partylist	181,066	0.46	0	−1
Serbisyo sa Bayan Party	175,520	0.44	0	0
Abante Pangasinan-Ilokano Party	170,795	0.43	0	−1
AGRI Partylist	168,032	0.42	0	−1
Asap Na	164,030	0.41	0	0
Bayan Muna	162,894	0.41	0	0
Eduaksyon	161,517	0.41	0	0
Akay ni Sol	159,748	0.40	0	0
Ahon Mahirap	157,991	0.40	0	0
1Munti Partylist	157,665	0.40	0	0
H.E.L.P. Pilipinas	157,308	0.40	0	0
A Teacher Partylist	157,116	0.40	0	0
Babae Ako	157,041	0.40	0	0
Anakalusugan	154,121	0.39	0	−1
Pilipinas Babangon Muli	154,025	0.39	0	0
Batang Quiapo Partylist	153,637	0.39	0	0
Lunas	151,494	0.38	0	0
Kabalikat ng Mamamayan	141,847	0.36	0	−1
WIFI	141,041	0.36	0	0
Aangat Tayo	140,597	0.35	0	0
Laang Kawal	136,484	0.34	0	0
Ako Padayon	134,292	0.34	0	0
Solo Parents	131,659	0.33	0	0
Pamilya Ko	124,228	0.31	0	0
Pamilyang Magsasaka	117,440	0.30	0	0
ANGKASANGGA	115,720	0.29	0	0
Kasambahay	111,269	0.28	0	0
Bangon Bagong Minero	111,174	0.28	0	0
Pamilya Muna	108,483	0.27	0	0
Kababaihan	107,848	0.27	0	0
AA-Kasosyo Party	107,262	0.27	0	0
Tulungan Tayo	106,504	0.27	0	0
Health Workers	105,512	0.27	0	0
1Agila	104,868	0.26	0	0
Boses Party-List	102,588	0.26	0	0
Buhay Party-List	99,365	0.25	0	0
Ipatupad For Workers	96,735	0.24	0	0
Gilas	96,646	0.24	0	0
Bunyog Party	93,825	0.24	0	0
Vendors Partylist	88,845	0.22	0	0
Bayaning Tsuper	84,204	0.21	0	0
Bisaya Gyud Party-List	79,915	0.20	0	0
Magdalo Party-List	78,984	0.20	0	0
Maharlikang Pilipino Party	78,700	0.20	0	0
Arangkada Pilipino	75,493	0.19	0	0
Bagong Maunlad na Pilipinas	70,595	0.18	0	0
Damayang Filipino	68,480	0.17	0	0
Partido sa Bagong Pilipino	68,085	0.17	0	0
Heal PH	67,085	0.17	0	0
Ang Tinig ng Seniors	66,553	0.17	0	0
Ako OFW	60,230	0.15	0	0
Aksyon Dapat	58,916	0.15	0	0
Aktibong Kaagapay	55,829	0.14	0	0
UGB Partylist	53,633	0.14	0	0
Ang Komadrona	53,017	0.13	0	0
United Frontliners	52,338	0.13	0	0
Gabay	52,109	0.13	0	0
Tictok	51,354	0.13	0	0
Ako Tanod	49,553	0.13	0	0
Barangay Natin	49,364	0.12	0	0
Abante Bisdak	49,114	0.12	0	0
Turismo	47,645	0.12	0	0
Ang Bumbero ng Pilipinas	47,027	0.12	0	0
BFF	45,816	0.12	0	0
Pinoy Ako	44,419	0.11	0	0
Patrol Partylist	41,570	0.10	0	−1
Tutok To Win Party-List	41,036	0.10	0	−1
Lingap	38,564	0.10	0	0
Maagap	35,871	0.09	0	0
PBA Partylist	35,078	0.09	0	−1
Ilocano Defenders	32,028	0.08	0	0
Pamana	31,526	0.08	0	0
Kaunlad Pinoy	30,898	0.08	0	0
Juan Pinoy	27,523	0.07	0	0
Rebolusyonaryong Alyansang Makabansa	26,771	0.07	0	0
Arise	26,565	0.07	0	0
Click Party	25,914	0.07	0	0
MPBL Partylist	23,189	0.06	0	0
PROMDI	23,144	0.06	0	0
Bida Katagumpay	20,885	0.05	0	0
Hugpong Federal	19,028	0.05	0	0
Arte	14,169	0.04	0	0
Peoples Champ Guardians Partylist	11,492	0.03	0	0
Sulong Dignidad	8,120	0.02	0	0
Total	39,611,775	100.00	64	+1
Valid votes	39,611,775	69.07	+3.62	
Invalid/blank votes (Note: Includes 2,338,564 votes for Duterte Youth, which the Commission on Elections (COMELEC) second division cancelled its registration on June 18, 2025, which was later affirmed by the COMELEC en banc, thereby preventing all of its nominees from assuming their seats. The COMELEC then proclaimed three party-lists with one seat each as winners.)	17,739,183	30.93	−3.62	
Total votes	57,350,958	100.00	–	
Registered voters/turnout	69,673,655	82.31	−0.67	
Source: COMELEC (vote totals)

== Elected representatives ==
Party	Representative
Akbayan	Chel Diokno
Akbayan	Perci Cendaña (incumbent)
Akbayan	Dadah Kiram Ismula
Tingog	Andrew Julian Romualdez
Tingog	Jude Acidre (incumbent)
Tingog	Marie Josephine Calatrava
4Ps	Marcelino Libanan (incumbent)
4Ps	Jonathan Clement Abalos (incumbent)
ACT-CIS	Edvic Yap (incumbent)
ACT-CIS	Jocelyn Tulfo (incumbent)
Ako Bicol	Zaldy Co (incumbent)
Ako Bicol	Alfredo Garbin
Uswag Ilonggo	Jojo Ang (incumbent)
Solid North	Ching Bernos (incumbent (Note: Incumbent representative for Abra's at-large district.))
Trabaho	Johanne Monich Bautista
CIBAC	Eddie Villanueva (incumbent)
Malasakit at Bayanihan	Girlie Veloso
Senior Citizens	Rodolfo Ordanes (incumbent)
PPP	Harold Duterte
ML	Leila de Lima
FPJ Panday Bayanihan	Brian Poe Llamanzares
United Senior Citizens	Milagros Magsaysay (incumbent)
4K	Iris Marie Montes
LPGMA	Allan Ty (incumbent)
Coop-NATCCO	Felimon Espares (incumbent)
Ako Bisaya	Sonny Lagon (incumbent)
CWS	Edwin Gardiola (incumbent)
Pinoy Workers	Franz Vincent Legazpi
AGAP	Nicanor Briones (incumbent)
Asenso Pinoy	Henry Oaminal Jr.
Agimat	Bryan Revilla (incumbent)
TGP	Jose Teves Jr. (incumbent)
SAGIP	Paolo Marcoleta
ALONA	Maria Cristina Lopez
1-Rider	Rodge Gutierrez (incumbent)
Kamanggagawa	Eli San Fernando
Galing sa Puso	Jan Rurik Padiernos
Kamalayan	Caroline Tanchay (incumbent (Note: Incumbent representative for SAGIP Partylist.))
Bicol Saro	Terry Ridon
Kusug Tausug	Aiman Tan
ACT Teachers	Antonio Tinio
One Coop	Maria Kristina Jihan Glepa
KM Ngayon Na	Kenneth Paolo Tereng
Abante Mindanao	Maximo Rodriguez Jr.
BH	Roberto Nazal Jr.
TUCP	Raymond Mendoza (incumbent)
Kabataan	Renee Co
APEC	Sergio Dagooc (incumbent)
Magbubukid	Ferdinand Beltran
1Tahanan	Nathaniel Oducado
Ako Ilocano Ako	Richelle Singson-Michael (incumbent)
Manila Teachers	Maria Nina Francesca Lacson
Nanay	Florabel Yatco
KAPUSO PM	Munir Arbison Jr. (incumbent (Note: Incumbent representative for Sulu's 2nd district.))
SSS-GSIS Pensyonado	Rolando Macasaet
DUMPER PTDA	Claudine Bautista-Lim (incumbent)
Abang Lingkod	Manuel Frederick Ko
Pusong Pinoy	Jernie Jett Nisay (incumbent)
SWERTE	Arlyn Ayon
PhilRECA	Presley de Jesus (incumbent)
Gabriela	Sarah Elago
Abono	Robert Raymond Estrella (incumbent)
Ang Probinsyano	Alfred delos Santos (incumbent)
Murang Kuryente	Arthur C. Yap
