= 2028 Philippine House of Representatives elections =

Philippine House of Representatives election

- May 8, 2028

All 318 seats to the House of Representatives of the Philippines 160 seats needed for a majority
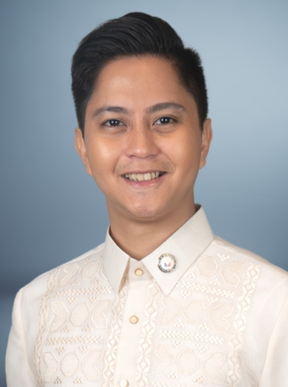

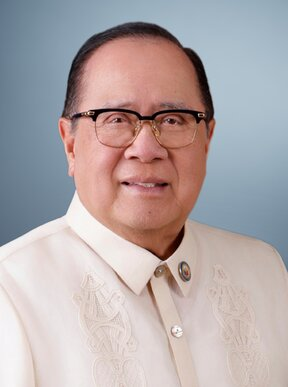

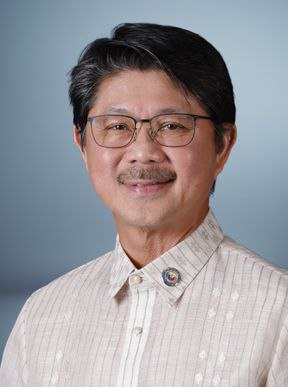

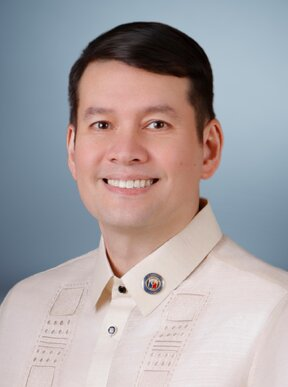
	Majority party	Minority party
Leader	Sandro Marcos	Ronaldo Puno
Party	Lakas	NUP
Leader's seat	Ilocos Norte–1st	Antipolo–1st
Seats before	76	56
	Third party	Fourth party
Leader	Bojie Dy	Mark Enverga
Party	PFP	NPC
Leader's seat	Isabela–6th	Quezon–1st (term-limited)
Seats before	51	35
- Congressional district elections
- All 254 seats from congressional districts
- Party-list election
- All 64 seats under the party-list system
TBD Result
Speaker before
Bojie Dy; PFP

The 2028 Philippine House of Representatives elections will be the 38th lower house elections in the Philippines, and 28th as the House of Representatives. It is scheduled to be held on May 8, 2028, within the 2028 Philippine general election. All 318 seats in the House of Representatives will be contested in this election, including one seat for each of the 254 congressional districts in the country and 64 seats representing party-lists apportioned on a nationwide vote.

The winners of this election will serve in the 21st Congress of the Philippines from June 30, 2028.

== Background ==
The 2025 midterm elections saw major parties align with the administration coalition, Alyansa para sa Bagong Pilipinas. The Partido Federal ng Pilipinas (PFP), Lakas–CMD, Nationalist People's Coalition (NPC), National Unity Party (NUP), and Nacionalista Party formed part of the coalition's senatorial slate and fielded local candidates for congressional district elections in the House of Representatives.

Martin Romualdez was re-elected speaker of the House at the start of the 20th Congress, with President Bongbong Marcos's son, Sandro, elected as House majority leader. Romualdez served until his resignation on September 17, 2025, amid allegations surrounding anomalous flood control projects. He was succeeded by Bojie Dy, a fellow member of President Marcos's Partido Federal ng Pilipinas.

By mid-2026, lawmakers had begun leaving Lakas–CMD for PFP and NUP, while others were reportedly seeking to join NPC.

== Electoral system ==
The Philippines uses parallel voting for its lower house elections. For this election, there are 317 seats in the House of Representatives; 254 of these are district representatives, and 63 are party-list representatives.

The 1987 Constitution mandates that there should be one party-list representative for every four district representatives. District representatives are elected under the first-past-the-post system from single-member districts. Congress has the power of creating congressional districts. The constitution originally had 200 districts, but had increased in number since then to the current 254 that will be disputed in this election.

Party-list representatives are elected via the nationwide vote with a 2% election threshold, with a party winning not more than three seats. The party with the most votes usually wins three seats, then the other parties with more than 2% of the vote two seats. At this point, if all of the party-list seats are not filled up, the parties with less than 2% of the vote will win one seat each until all party-list seats are filled up. The electoral system, with the 2% threshold and the three-seat cap, encourage vote splitting; and encourage sectors to up separate party-lists for every sector so as not to waste their vote on just one party.

Political parties competing in the party-list election are barred from participating district elections, and vice versa, unless permitted by the Commission on Elections. Party-lists and political parties participating in the district elections may forge coalition deals with one another.

== Term-limited incumbents ==
Districts where the incumbent representative is term-limited from seeking re-election in 2028 1CEBU incumbent CDP incumbent HTL incumbent Lakas incumbent LDP incumbent Liberal incumbent Nacionalista incumbent NPC incumbent

A total of 49 representatives have been elected three consecutive times in regular elections and are barred from seeking another congressional term in 2028.

Party	Member	Constituency
1CEBU	Duke Frasco	Cebu–5th
ACT-CIS	Jocelyn Tulfo	Party-list
Ako Bisaya	Sonny Lagon	Party-list
APEC Partylist	Sergio Dagooc	Party-list
CDP	Rufus Rodriguez	Cagayan de Oro–2nd
CIBAC	Eddie Villanueva	Party-list
DUMPER PTDA	Claudine Bautista-Lim	Party-list
HTL	Paolo Duterte	Davao City–1st
HTL	Isidro Ungab	Davao City–3rd
Lakas	Yasser Balindong	Lanao del Sur–2nd
Lakas	Julienne Baronda	Iloilo City at-large
Lakas	Antonino Calixto	Pasay at-large
Lakas	Carl Cari	Leyte–5th
Lakas	Emmarie Dizon	Mandaue at-large
Lakas	Ian Paul Dy	Isabela–3rd
Lakas	Mike Dy III	Isabela–5th
Lakas	Gerardo Espina Jr.	Biliran at-large
Lakas	Jonathan Keith Flores	Bukidnon–2nd
Lakas	Janette Garin	Iloilo–1st
Lakas	Wilton Kho	Masbate–3rd
Lakas	Joseph Lara	Cagayan–3rd
Lakas	Martin Romualdez	Leyte–1st
Lakas	David Suarez	Quezon–2nd
Lakas	Samier Tan	Sulu–1st
LDP	Rommel T. Angara	Aurora at-large
Liberal	Alfonso Umali Jr.	Oriental Mindoro–2nd
LPGMA	Allan Ty	Party-list
Nacionalista	Rudy Caoagdan	Cotabato–2nd
Nacionalista	Angelo Barba	Ilocos Norte–2nd
Nacionalista	Maximo Dalog Jr.	Mountain Province at-large
Nacionalista	Eleandro Jesus Madrona	Romblon at-large
NPC	Cheeno Almario	Davao Oriental–2nd
NPC	Solomon Chungalao	Ifugao at-large
NPC	Mark Enverga	Quezon–1st
NPC	Arnulf Bryan Fuentebella	Camarines Sur–4th
NPC	Lolita Javier	Leyte–2nd
NPC	Roman Romulo	Pasig at-large

== Marginal seats ==
=== Elections in congressional districts ===
These are the marginal seats that had a winning margin of 5% or less in the 2025 elections, in ascending order via margin:

Party	Member	Constituency	2025 margin
PFP	Benjamin Agarao Jr.	Laguna–4th	0.12%
NPC	Bong Suntay	Quezon City–4th	0.14%
PFP	Esmael Mangudadatu	Maguindanao del Sur	0.24%
PFP	Kokoy Salvador	Nueva Ecija–2nd	0.29%
NPC	Kenneth Gatchalian	Valenzuela–1st	0.49%
PFP	Eulogio Rodriguez	Catanduanes	0.59%
NPC	Josefina Tallado	Camarines Norte–1st	0.60%
PFP	Kat Chua	Zamboanga City–1st	0.67%
NUP	Caloy Loria	Albay–2nd	1.16%
NPC	Nelson Legacion	Camarines Sur–3rd	1.41%
Lakas	Edwin Cruzado	Cotabato–1st	1.84%
Lakas	Adrian Salceda	Albay–3rd	1.90%
PFP	Lordan Suan	Cagayan de Oro–1st	1.98%
NPC	Florencio Miraflores	Aklan–2nd	2.03%
Lakas	Ramil Hernandez	Laguna–2nd	2.32%
PFP	Jay Vergara	Nueva Ecija–3rd	2.84%
NUP	Joel Chua	Manila–3rd	3.24%
NPC	Gil Acosta Jr.	Palawan–3rd	3.86%
NUP	Irwin Tieng	Manila–5th	4.16%
NUP	Christopherson Yap	Southern Leyte–2nd	4.36%
NPC	Dennis Hernandez	Rizal–4th	4.56%
Lakas	Dibu Tuan	South Cotabato–3rd	4.66%

=== Party-list election ===
The following party-lists won less than 2% of the vote in 2025, and only won one seat each because all of party-list seats have not been filled up by the parties that did win at least 2% of the vote. These are sorted by number of votes in descending order.

Less than 2% of the vote, but greater than or equal to 1%:

- Uswag Ilonggo (Jojo Ang)
- Solid North Party (Ching Bernos)
- Trabaho Partylist (Johanne Monich Bautista)
- Citizens' Battle Against Corruption (Eddie Villanueva)
- Malasakit at Bayanihan (Girlie Veloso)
- Senior Citizens Partylist (Rodolfo Ordanes)
- Puwersa ng Pilipinong Pandagat (Harold Duterte)
- Mamamayang Liberal (Leila de Lima)
- FPJ Panday Bayanihan (Brian Poe Llamanzares)
- United Senior Citizens Partylist (Milagros Magsaysay)
- 4K Partylist (Iris Marie Montes)
- LPG Marketers Association (Allan Ty)
- Coop-NATCCO (Felimon Espares)
- Ako Bisaya (Sonny Lagon)
- Construction Workers Solidarity (Edwin Gardiola)
- Pinoy Workers Partylist (Karl Josef Legazpi)
- AGAP Partylist (Nicanor Briones)
- Asenso Pinoy (Henry Oaminal Jr.)
- Agimat Partylist (Bryan Revilla)
- TGP Partylist (Jose Teves Jr.)
- SAGIP Partylist (Paolo Marcoleta)

Less than 1% of the vote:

- Alona Partylist (Maria Cristina Lopez)
- 1-Rider Partylist (Rodge Gutierrez)
- Kamanggagawa (Eli San Fernando)
- Galing sa Puso Party (Jan Rurik Padiernos)
- Kamalayan (Caroline Tanchay)
- Bicol Saro (Terry Ridon)
- Kusug Tausug (Aiman Tan)
- Alliance of Concerned Teachers (Antonio Tinio)
- One Coop (Maria Kristina Jihan Glepa)
- KM Ngayon Na (Kenneth Paolo Tereng)
- Abante Mindanao (Maximo Rodriguez Jr.)
- Bagong Henerasyon (Roberto Nazal Jr.)
- Trade Union Congress Party (Raymond Mendoza)
- Kabataan (Renee Co)
- APEC Partylist (Sergio Dagooc)
- Magbubukid (Ferdinand Beltran)
- 1Tahanan (Nathaniel Oducado)
- Ako Ilocano Ako (Richelle Singson-Michael)
- Manila Teachers Party-List (Maria Nina Francesca Lacson)
- Nanay Partylist (Florabel Yatco)
- Kapuso PM (Munir Arbison Jr.)
- SSS-GSIS Pensyonado (Rolando Macasaet)
- DUMPER Partylist (Claudine Bautista-Lim)
- Abang Lingkod (Manuel Frederick Ko)
- Pusong Pinoy (Jernie Jett Nisay)
- Swerte (Arlyn Ayon)
- Philreca Party-List (Presley de Jesus)
- Gabriela Women's Party (Sarah Elago)
- Abono Partylist (Robert Raymond Estrella)
- Ang Probinsyano Party-list (Alfred delos Santos)
- Murang Kuryente Partylist (Arthur C. Yap)

== See also ==
- 2028 Philippine Senate election
- 20th Congress of the Philippines
