= Nominees in the 2025 Philippine House of Representatives party-list election =

The following are the nominees in the 2025 Philippine House of Representatives party-list election.

The Commission on Elections published the nominees of every partylist participating in the election on October 25, 2024.

These are arranged by order the parties appear on the ballot. Winners that have won a seat are in boldface.

== Nominees ==
1. 4Ps (Pagtibayin at Palaguin ang Pangkabuhayang Pilipino)
  1. **Marcelino Libanan (incumbent)**
  2. **Jonathan Clement Abalos (incumbent)**
  3. Edward Cigres
  4. Elosa Salvacion Libanan-Gonzales
  5. Jonathan Clement Abalos
  6. Edwin Cigres
  7. Amador Lazaro Jr.
  8. Lezlee Garcia
  9. Sol Angelie Salvador
  10. Genaro Galvez
2. PPP (Puwersa ng Pilipinong Pandagat)
  1. **Harold Duterte**
  2. Matthew Bryan Lim
  3. Johnny Toleran
  4. Jinky Villarmia
  5. Panopio Odin
  6. Walter Bersabal
  7. Roland Salinas
  8. Jul Ambo
  9. Ariel Rabanes
  10. Arvin Catao
3. FPJ Panday Bayanihan
  1. **Brian Poe Llamanzares**
  2. Mark Lester Patron
  3. Hiyas Govinda Dolor
  4. Teodoro Misael Daniel Llamanzares
  5. Khouleen Ann Taule
  6. Kevin Buen Marquez
  7. Irene Apple Patron
  8. Michael Villarias
  9. Adrian John Tirao
  10. Harvey Pinohermoso
4. Kabataan
  1. **Renee Co**
  2. Jose Paolo Echavez
  3. John Peter Angelo Garcia
  4. John Gabriel Siscar
  5. Jayvie Cabajes
  6. Mia Angela Simon
  7. Kjerrimyr Andres
  8. James Bryan Galas
  9. Crimson Labinghisa
  10. Maria Melissa Angelica de Vera
5. Duterte Youth (Duty to Energize the Republic Through the Enlightenment of the Youth)
  1. Drixie Mae Cardema (incumbent)
  2. Berlin Lingwa
  3. Ron Godfrey Bawalan
  4. Bea Gian Carla Lapitan
  5. Jeremie Namnama
  6. Maricon Casio
  7. Angelika Padriga
  8. Dan Gerald Luzano
  9. Reynaldo Mendoza
  10. Mark Maureen Berano
6. ML (Mamamayang Liberal)
  1. **Leila de Lima**
  2. Teddy Baguilat
  3. Erin Tañada
  4. Rowena Amon
  5. Filomena Cinco
  6. Hernani Panganiban
  7. Earl John Bilog
  8. Juliana Riparip
  9. Winnifredo Lati
  10. Frine Cristina Sanchez
7. PBBM (Pilipinas Babangon Muli)
  1. Maria Cecilia Badajos
  2. Thomas Dominic Baluga
  3. Karen Acosta
  4. Elena Badajos
  5. Iana Alexis Garcia
  6. Francis Carl Acosta
  7. Jerald Dao
  8. Alejandro Badajos
  9. Henrietta Francesca Acosta
  10. Marc Dan Acosta
8. P3PWD (Komunidad ng Pamilya, Pasyente at Persons with Disabilities)
  1. Rowena Guanzon
  2. Maria Camille Ilagan
  3. Marianne Heidi Fullon
  4. Maria Elissa Isagan
  5. Dylan Romulo Santos
  6. Donnabel Tenorio
  7. Bernadine Montelibano
  8. Lily Grace Tiangco
  9. Rodolfo Villar Jr.
  10. Francisco Concepcion Jr.
9. Murang Kuryente
  1. **Arthur C. Yap**
  2. Noli de Pedro
  3. Raymund Hilarion Genilo
  4. Emmelyn de Pedro
  5. Jose Mari Carbonell
  6. Cecil Loste II
  7. Eleanor Alcantara
  8. Leonardo Alcantara Jr.
  9. Analyn Portes
  10. Via Rhidda Imperial
10. Bicol Saro
  1. **Terry Ridon**
  2. Lara Maria Villafuerte
  3. Julio Mari Villafuerte
  4. Mac Arthur Samson Jr.
  5. Arron James Pagaduan
  6. Lydia Abarientos
  7. Rudolph Dominic Valdez
  8. Delia Simbulan
  9. Charis Hernandez
  10. Megan Astrid Nuñez
11. Ipatupad (Ipatupad for Workers)
  1. Pearl Caryl Davis
  2. Venus Apas
  3. Reynaldo Emperado
  4. Ian Christian Valencia
  5. Augustine Raphael Abragan
  6. Balvin Quillotes
  7. Jean Benedicto
  8. Gielito Emperado
  9. Glenford Philip Artuz
  10. Carlos Joaquin Emperado
12. PATROL (Public Safety Alliance for Transformation and Rule of Law)
  1. Juan Carlos Bustos
  2. Celso Aristotle Parrilla
  3. Mary Rosaleen Bustos-Agaton
  4. Jose Benedicto Bustos
  5. Raymundo Turla
  6. Leonardo Daracan
  7. Ariel Arcinas
  8. Gabriel Velasco
  9. Daisy Velasco
  10. Maria Cristina Perez
13. Juan Pinoy (Juan-Pinagkaisang Ordinaryong Mamamayan para Yumabong)
  1. Martin Nieto
  2. Danilo Nesperos
  3. John Lucas Lejandro Nieto
  4. Yolanda Tangog
  5. Genel de Lemon
  6. Jonathan Carlo Javier
  7. Sheila Inventado
  8. Francis Jayson Flores
  9. Benjamin James Viriña Jr.
  10. Mark Heinz Abesamis
14. ARTE (Advocates for Retail, Fashion, Textile, Tradition, Events and Creative Services Sector)
  1. Lloyd Peter Lee
  2. Anne Bernardo
  3. Jonas Gaffud
  4. Divine Grace Gallardo
  5. Ramon Mangila
  6. Melody Anne Dy Ning
  7. Lynn Priscilla Lee
  8. Buena Bonita Ty
  9. Lester Philip Lee
  10. Mark Deo Mostoles
15. WIFI (Walang Iwanan sa Free Internet)
  1. Mark Jerome Mendoza
  2. Enrico Pineda
  3. Samuel Buenviaje
  4. Emerson Magbitang
  5. Amador de Vera III
  6. Salvador San Antonio Jr.
  7. Vincent Quitan
  8. Godwin Toribio
  9. Jonathan Morada
  10. Beatriz Cabral
16. MAAGAP (Movement of Active Apostolic Guardians Association of the Philippines)
  1. Teroy Taguindo
  2. Isaias Culinares Jr.
  3. Armando Gonzales
  4. Jenny Lee Garcia
  5. Paul Gabunales
  6. Efren Villanueva
  7. Roberto Vazquez Jr.
  8. Gerrard Taguindo
  9. Richardson Basa
  10. Antolin Cuizon
17. United Senior Citizens (United Senior Citizens Koalition ng Pilipinas)
  1. **Milagros Magsaysay (incumbent)**
  2. Gertrudo de Leon
  3. Katrina Nepomuceno
  4. Michael Antonio Magsaysay
  5. Teresita Villarama
  6. Angelito Pragides
  7. Maximino Camacho
  8. Antonio Guillermo Aquino
  9. Baiminang Madale
  10. Josephine Gomez
18. Epanaw Sambayanan (Mindanao Indigenous Peoples Conference for Peace and Development)
  1. Marlon Bosantog
  2. Lorraine Badoy-Partosa
  3. Jeffrey Celiz
  4. Joel Unad
  5. Romel Pallay
  6. Joel Limsa
  7. Edmund Pangilan
  8. Jimmy Guinsod
  9. Ramil Ansihagan
  10. Naiza Climaco
19. Ako Padayon (Ako Padayon Pilipino)
  1. Jose Benjamin Benaldo
  2. Raymond Charles Recto
  3. David Solomon Siquian
  4. Edmundo Pacamalan Jr.
  5. Roberto Manto
  6. Griscelda Joson
  7. Renan Liangco
  8. Jomar Sabud
  9. Dirika Pacamalan
  10. Michael Cabello
20. TUCP (Trade Union Congress Party)
  1. **Raymond Mendoza (incumbent)**
  2. Lemuel Noveda
  3. Miguel Ramonkito Mendoza
  4. Archie Capoy
  5. Mark Sean Patrick Cabaya
  6. Cecilio Seno III
  7. Rina Dalam
  8. Mark Christian Villena
  9. Reynante Arellano
  10. Rolante Santos
21. ACT Teachers (Alliance of Concerned Teachers)
  1. **Antonio Tinio**
  2. Helene Dimaukom
  3. David Michael San Juan
  4. Raymond Basilio
  5. Blesilda Mediran
  6. April Dyan Gumanao
  7. Arnulfo Anoos
  8. Gary Devilles
  9. Joyce Caubat
  10. Fabian Hallig
22. 1-PACMAN (One Patriotic Coalition of Marginalized Nationals)
  1. Milka Romero
  2. Bobby Pacquiao
  3. Sheida May Mohammad
  4. Marvee Espejo
  5. Edwin Joseph Galvez
  6. Richard Von de Castro
  7. Paul Vincent Cunanan
  8. Romeo Fernando Jr.
  9. Richard Lapira
  10. Kenneth Madali
23. TGP (Talino at Galing ng Pinoy)
  1. **Jose Teves Jr. (incumbent)**
  2. Aaron Carlo Cabrera
  3. Sirad Laut
  4. Jonas Ybañez
  5. Noriel Millares
  6. Reyson Ponce
  7. Joseph Romiral
  8. Jaime Barbara
  9. Lowella Perpetua Garganera
  10. Danilo Mangahas
24. DUMPER PTDA (DUMPER Philippines Taxi Drivers Association)
  1. **Claudine Bautista-Lim (incumbent)**
  2. Celine Sarah Bautista
  3. Robin Carlo Reyes
  4. Giovanni Gabriento
  5. Claude Benjamin Bautista
  6. Queenie Rama
  7. Fermin Octobre
  8. Angelo Gabriel Antonio
  9. Jomari Taccad
  10. Gabriel John Ramirez
25. Anakalusugan (Alagaan Natin Ating Kalusugan)
  1. Ray Florence Reyes (incumbent)
  2. Ernesto Mandanas Jr.
  3. Raymundo Roquero
  4. Christopher dela Cruz
  5. Arnielyn Aguirre
  6. Ronald Reyes
  7. Christian Gonzales
  8. Liezl Comia
  9. Paulo Manigbas Jr.
  10. Jose Ferrer
26. Aksyon Dapat
  1. Hernani Braganza
  2. Robbie Pierre Roco
  3. Edgar Lagman
  4. Daniel Escalona Jr.
  5. Ralph Matthew Escalona
  6. Omihayrah Dalidig
  7. Glenn Rabadon
  8. Raymundo Ortiz
  9. Faith Bacon
  10. Roberto Ador
27. BHW (Barangay Health Wellness Partylist)
  1. Angelica Natasha Co (incumbent)
  2. Maria Dominga Cecilia Padilla
  3. Aleeza Arielle Sian
  4. Zenaida Pulido
  5. Alvin Carandang
  6. Khonan Dark Cerial
  7. Jahmel Mora
  8. Helen Tesoro
  9. Armando Tena Jr.
  10. Nora Llaneta
28. Sulong Dignidad (Sulong Dignidad Regional Political Party)
  1. Rico Paulo Quicho
  2. Rommell Lumagui
  3. John Philip Yeung
  4. Kathleen Capulong
  5. Francis John Francisco
  6. Anna Marie Irigo
  7. Edgar Lance Capulong
  8. Wenchester Neal Lubiano
  9. Carl Maria Vladimir Valera
  10. Princess Mae Tapia
29. Batang Quiapo (Sulong mga Batang Quiapo)
  1. Media Zofia Canlas
  2. Christian Benedict Bribon
  3. Ruskin Principe
  4. Vilma Macasaet-Arce
  5. Jelbert Perdez
  6. Ampcor Eunice Canlas
  7. Matthew Zafe
  8. Joselito Cinco
  9. Kevin Beboso
  10. Jaiadd Morales
30. PBA (Puwersa ng Bayaning Atleta)
  1. Mark Alexander Sambar
  2. Vittorio Ortega
  3. Dennis Laogan
  4. Andrea Marie Sambar
  5. Cleve Denrick Geronimo
  6. Mary Andrea Gantioqui
  7. Maria Teresa Esguerra
  8. Jonalyn Caparal
  9. Alyssa Mari Germedia
  10. Bernard Andaya
31. GILAS (Generasyong Iniaalay Lagi ang Sarili)
  1. Reghis Christian Romero IV
  2. Junn Magno
  3. Jason Laureano Aquino
  4. Luis Jimenez
  5. Antonio Asistio II
  6. Reynante Sacaguing
  7. Carlos Cortez
  8. Antonio Tuason Jr.
  9. Joahna Mae Cadiz
  10. Beatrice Anna Consuelo de Guzman
32. AIA (Ako Ilocano Ako)
  1. **Richelle Singson-Michael (incumbent)**
  2. Allen Singson
  3. Chelsey Louisse Singson
  4. Luis Charles Singson
  5. Christian Luis Singson
  6. Wendhel Baro
  7. Janet Siega
  8. Edwin Beltran
  9. Romeo Cañete Jr.
  10. James Kenneth Roldan
33. Pamilyang Magsasaka
  1. Randy Cirio
  2. Margarita Cabria
  3. Shiela Lyn Nollan
  4. Marietta Loveña
  5. Andres Paclibar
  6. Rowena Gito
  7. Gregorio Ibasco
  8. Benjamin Aguid
  9. Myra Pura
  10. Ernesto Cleofe
34. CLICK (Computer Literacy Innovation Connectivity and Knowledge)
  1. Nicasio Conti
  2. Gian Carlo Bautista
  3. Felipe de Sagun
  4. Loreto Berana Jr.
  5. Pierre Gonzales
  6. Edwin Erni
  7. Samson Panganiban
  8. Francis Adrian Manalo
  9. Erwin Aseron
  10. Abdulfatah Marohom
35. Abante Bisdak
  1. Godofredo Guya
  2. VJ Mendez
  3. Benthoven Sarajan
  4. Rommel Gavieta
  5. Maria Katrina Guevara
  6. Joselito Arriola
  7. Honorio Granada Jr.
  8. Andie Visitacion
  9. Lemuel Angelo Eleccion
  10. Rafael Avanzado
36. Manila Teachers (Manila Teachers Savings and Loan Association)
  1. **Maria Nina Francesca Lacson**
  2. Paul Sembrano
  3. Gil Magbanua
  4. Buddy Arcangel
  5. Maria Victoria Suarez
  6. Asuncion Howe
  7. Mila Pilapil
  8. Evelyn Dimagiba
  9. Angelita Alfante
  10. Virgilio Sibuma Lacson II
37. Pamana (Ibalik ang Kulturang Pamana Movement)
  1. Senen Jerez
  2. Don Oliver Jerez
  3. Leoncio Moneda Jr.
  4. Arnulfo Leal
  5. Felix Caballero Jr.
  6. Robert Pasion
  7. Mildred Ruallo
  8. Alexander Villalon
  9. Heraldo Abayan Jr.
  10. Joffren Buerano
38. Nanay
  1. **Florabel Yatco**
  2. Ananias Canlas Jr.
  3. Yolanda Pineda
  4. Christopher George Yatco
  5. Rosette Marie Bendicion
  6. Andrew Bendicion
  7. Melanie Dy
  8. Jaimee de los Santos
  9. Michelle de Leon
  10. Madeline Arezu Jam
39. KM Ngayon Na (Kilos Mamamayan Ngayon Na)
  1. **Kenneth Paolo Tereng**
  2. Cecilio Mercado
  3. Winston Joe Latawan
  4. Derick Wooden
  5. Gabriel Garcia
  6. James Benos
  7. Junifer Bosleng
  8. Denmark Cos-Agon
  9. Joel Mabiasan
  10. Danford Amos Sr.
40. Babae Ako (Babae Ako para sa Bayan)
  - Capalongan faction
    1. Ria Liza Canlas
    2. Ester Gunigundo
    3. Marie Concepcion Tan
    4. Celia Ong
    5. Angie Encio
    6. Vilma Santiago
    7. Maribeth Magana
    8. Merlita Garcia
    9. Jocelyn Palcoto
    10. Fermin Sunga
  - Dimayuga faction
    1. Rossel Dimayuga
    2. Geeian Gambala
    3. Loreta Caburnay
    4. Mary Cyril Talon
    5. Michelle Velitario
    6. Renzel Mae Dimayuga
    7. Aiza Andal
    8. Queennie Talon
    9. Nikki Ann Manalo
    10. Maricar Naboreda
41. ARISE (Alliance for Resilience Sustainability and Empowerment)
  1. Rene Ofreneo
  2. Danilo Glipo
  3. Randy Buen
  4. Darwin Vargas
  5. Trinidad Domingo
  6. Fernando Policarpio
  7. Maria Divina Muñoz
  8. Pinky Pellosis
  9. Dennis Jimenez
  10. Maria Marilyn Relocano
42. Magdalo (Magdalo para sa Pilipino)
  1. Gary Alejano
  2. Eugene Louie Gonzalez
  3. Maria Yvonne Christina Jereza
  4. Charlie Pascua
  5. Jon Jon Brozas
  6. Aldwin de Vera
  7. Dennis Alexander Villoso
  8. Jimmy Austria
  9. Ronald Galang
  10. Francisca Villanueva
43. APEC (Association of Philippine Electric Cooperatives)
  1. **Sergio Dagooc (incumbent)**
  2. Allan Laniba
  3. Karl Juanito Condes
  4. Edgar Diaz
  5. Rene Fajilagutan
  6. Virgilio Fortich Jr.
  7. Emmanuel Galarse
  8. Humphrey Dolor
  9. Salvador Divinagracia Jr.
  10. Joey Talon
44. MAGBUBUKID (Mamamayan para sa Gobyernong Bubuklod sa mga Isip at Diwa ng mga Pilipino)
  1. **Ferdinand Beltran**
  2. Remy Albano
  3. Dante Cudal
  4. Nilo Lauron
  5. Patricio Laberez Jr.
  6. Joanna Marie Albano
  7. Francis Gerard Bernardino
  8. Fernando Cristobal
  9. Sheangel Kakes Morales
  10. Gabriel Si
45. SSS-GSIS Pensyonado
  1. **Rolando Macasaet**
  2. Tyrone Rigor
  3. Tito Espiritusanto
  4. Allan Narciso Macasaet
  5. Luis Climaco
  6. Ricardo Barrion
  7. Fercival Yutan
  8. Inocencio Mungcal Jr.
  9. Mariano Garcillano
  10. Lani Juanne Mae Tindongan
46. Gabriela (Gabriela Women's Party)
  1. **Sarah Elago**
  2. Catarina Estavillo
  3. Jean Suzanne Lindo
  4. Jacquiline Ruiz
  5. Miriam Amor Villanueva
  6. Jenelyn Caballero
  7. Lucia Francisco
  8. Emerlina de Lina
  9. Jacqueline Ratin
  10. Leny Ocasiones
47. Tingog (Tingog Sinirangan)
  1. **Andrew Julian Romualdez**
  2. **Jude Acidre (incumbent)**
  3. Marie Josephine Calatrava (resigned)
  4. Alexis Yu (renounced nomination)
  5. Paul Richard Muncada (renounced nomination)
  6. **Yedda Marie Romualdez (incumbent)**
  7. Aref Usman
  8. Liza Barrientos
  9. Jaime Go
  10. Glenn Jude Rufino
48. APAT-DAPAT (Ang Programang Aasenso Taumbayan - Dream, Act, Participate, Advocate for Sustainable Transformation)
  1. Charlotte Dumancas
  2. Verne Kelvin Enciso
  3. Czarina Rose del Rosario
  4. Reggielyn Arrienda
  5. Mikael Osias
  6. Nicole Osias
  7. John Rudolf Posadas
  8. Janszen Louie Aliswag
  9. John Paul Cordero
  10. Allan Boqueo
49. Ahon Mahirap
  1. Wilbert Tolentino
  2. Ike Ponce
  3. Erimar Ortigas
  4. Rosary Kristine Aplal
  5. Rico Almonicar
  6. Angelo Zipagan
  7. Marian Canillo
  8. Emmanuel Escondo
  9. Mary Letim
  10. Melanie Cabalida
50. UGB (Unyon ng mga Gabay ng Bayan)
  1. Melvin Contapay
  2. Maria Charo Calalo
  3. Nestor Nirza Jr.
  4. Vicenta Jangao
  5. Rene Dequiña
  6. Aquilina Cynthia Contapay
  7. Diomedes Valdez
  8. Gerardo Almonte
  9. Vener Castelo
  10. Bernard Villasor
51. Akbayan (Akbayan Citizens' Action Party)
  1. **Chel Diokno**
  2. **Perci Cendaña (incumbent)**
  3. **Dadah Kiram Ismula**
  4. Justine Raphael Luis Balane
  5. Mercedes Abucayon
  6. Magdalena Robinson
  7. Juan Carlo Tejano
  8. Ernesto Neri
  9. Napoleon Merida Jr.
  10. Angelina Katoh
52. Agimat (Agimat ng Masa)
  1. **Bryan Revilla (incumbent)**
  2. Samantha Panlilio
  3. Hernando Gutierrez
  4. Christopher Jedidiah Patricio
  5. Francis Alita
  6. Marcelina Salcedo
  7. Catherine Lungay
  8. Jesse Elecho
  9. Julito Paredez
  10. Manuel Lopez
53. PHILRECA (Philippine Rural Electric Cooperatives Association)
  1. **Presley de Jesus (incumbent)**
  2. Reynaldo Villanueva
  3. Jose Raul Saniel
  4. Janeene Depay-Colingan
  5. Zandro Gestiada
  6. Fredel Salvador
  7. Victor Cada
  8. Romwil de Jesus
  9. Clarisse Santos
  10. Kathleen Cayat
54. KAPUSO PM (Kabalikat Patungo sa Umuunlad na Sistematiko at Organisadong Pangkabuhayan)
  1. **Munir Arbison Jr. (incumbent (Note: Incumbent representative from Sulu's 2nd district.))**
  2. Abraham Ibba
  3. Evelyn Caraan
  4. Jonathan Doran
  5. Roy Porbosa
  6. Junrel Demit
  7. Peter Paul Torre
  8. Michael Copleras
  9. Alvin Marabella
  10. Lo Alei Damalerio
55. Ilocano Defenders
  1. Morgan Say
  2. Luz Say
  3. Caroline Pichay
  4. Gloria de los Angeles
  5. Dhiana Rose Escobar
  6. Reagan Say
  7. Joan Sumawang
  8. Rolex Umoso
  9. Aileen Ruama
  10. Benny Ponce
56. 1-Rider (Ang Buklod ng mga Motorista ng Pilipinas)
  1. **Rodge Gutierrez (incumbent)**
  2. Feliciano Carlo Hernandez
  3. Rodolfo Batang
  4. Morielle Isobel Cariño
  5. Erwin Cua
  6. Orestes Galang Jr.
  7. Jemerl Icawat
  8. Zandee Baclao
  9. Miryam Royce Alzaga
  10. Rodolfo Ceferino Madrid III
57. TICTOK (Tulong Ipamahagi sa Communidad Tungo Onsa Kaunlaran)
  1. Anthony Golez (incumbent (Note: Incumbent representative for the Malasakit@Bayanihan party-list.))
  2. Kaila Gardiola
  3. Jose Paolo Katigbak
  4. Denison Paul de Silva
  5. Alberto Elmer Gardiola
  6. Kim Ann Esguerra
  7. Katrina Mara Katigbak
  8. Ken Martin Gardiola
  9. Noel de Leon
  10. Elton Oracion
58. skipped (see Withdrawals section)
59. Bayan Muna
  1. Neri Colmenares
  2. Carlos Isagani Zarate
  3. Ferdinand Gaite
  4. Eufemia Cullamat
  5. Maria Kristina Conti
  6. Elizabeth Camoral
  7. Irma Espinosa
  8. Florentino Viuya Jr.
  9. Lean Redino Porquia
  10. Mitzi Jonelle Tan
60. Ang Probinsyano (Alyansa ng mga Mamamayang Probinsyano)
  1. **Alfred delos Santos** (incumbent)
  2. Maria Victoria Daet
  3. Edward delos Santos
  4. Michael Chua
  5. Jay dela Cuesta
  6. Alfred Nimo
  7. Jhon Moises Briagas
  8. Astor Thaddeus Co
  9. Regie Bahian
  10. Reynaldo Pino
61. BANAT (Note: BANAT (Banat Barangay Natin) was initially known as Barkadahan (Barkadahan para sa Bansa).) (Banat Barangay Natin)
  1. Prince Dandy Ferenal
  2. Thomas Christon Durano
  3. Ariel Potot
  4. Fitz Gabriel Ferenal
  5. Elyzza Nicole Ferenal
  6. Kennieth James Lising
  7. Maria Victoria Navarro
  8. Dean Andrew de Jesus
  9. Bernardito Florido Jr.
  10. Canaan Lee
62. SBP (Serbisyo sa Bayan Party)
  1. Ricardo Belmonte Jr.
  2. Bart Christian Corpus
  3. Raniela Resuello
  4. Milagros Casala
  5. Jose Ronaldo Gajudo
  6. Jose Valles Jr.
  7. Jimmy Lee
  8. Elizabeth Delarmente
  9. Eduard Martin Ignatius Francisco
  10. Marie Blandie Millado
63. Buhay (Buhay Hayaan Yumabong)
  1. Lito Atienza
  2. Rene Bullecer
  3. Carlos Sario
  4. Francisco Xavier Padilla
  5. Edmond Edward Flaminiano
  6. Melchor Monsod
  7. Vladimir Neil Valdepeñas
  8. Ernesto Moya
  9. Marvin John Carlo Sario
  10. Maria Carolina Esquela
64. Tulungan Tayo
  1. Cisco Jay Flores
  2. John Benedict Acosta
  3. Jethro Lloyd Tan
  4. Medzhid Ferrer
  5. Francisco Flores
  6. Kathryn Palaganas
  7. Cindy Mae Tan
  8. Rommel Tuliao
  9. Maria Alicia Palaganas
  10. Paul Joshua Guba
65. SAGIP (Social Amelioration and Genuine Intervention on Poverty)
  1. **Paolo Marcoleta**
  2. Johfel Valmocina
  3. Andy Nestor Ryan Pazon
  4. Jessyl Anne Mosot
  5. Emelinda San Antonio
  6. Venancio Lipana
  7. Jennifer Abaca
  8. Behilya Aileen Ahyong
  9. Kyzeth dela Cruz
  10. Lorina Noemi Navarro
66. BTS Bayaning Tsuper (Bayaning Tsuper)
  1. Aminola Abaton
  2. Manny Laxamana
  3. Faysah Dumarpa
  4. Isniehayah Abaton
  5. Ombra, Ibrahim
  6. Cosairi Maniri
  7. Saga Pagariongan
  8. Corazon Barrica
  9. Maria Agnes Bañares
  10. Rakim Abaton
67. Vendors (Vendors Samahan ng mga Maninindang Pilipino)
  1. Marilou Lipana
  2. Florencio Pesigan
  3. Sheryl Sandil
  4. Diwata
  5. Emilyn Garcia
  6. Liza Nicdao
  7. Michelle Ann Pusing
  8. Ronaldo Carlos
  9. Romulo Diaz Jr.
  10. Sonia Almosa
68. ACT-CIS (Anti-Crime and Terrorism-Community Involvement and Support)
  1. **Edvic Yap (incumbent)**
  2. **Jocelyn Tulfo (incumbent)**
  3. Jeffrey Soriano
  4. Maria Ganda Yap
  5. Eleanor Valerie So
  6. Elaine Veronica Chu
  7. Odette Molina
  8. Merelene Que
  9. Lucrecia Co
  10. Joy Ann Marie Soriano
69. Aktibong Kaagapay (Aktibong Kaagapay ng mga Manggagawa)
  1. Eugene Michael de Vera
  2. Nathalie Adeline Fernando
  3. Arturo Vargas Jr.
  4. Belinda Cruz
  5. Joel Jacob
  6. Editha Santos
  7. Monalisa Caroline Cruz
  8. Rey David Gayas
  9. Robert Michael Lures
  10. Lea Aratea
70. Asenso Pinoy
  1. **Henry Oaminal Jr.**
  2. Jose Yamamoto
  3. Samuel Parojinog
  4. Andres Fernandez Jr.
  5. Rowe Oaminal
  6. Crisinciano Mahilac
  7. Eric Lim
  8. Alexander Lim
  9. Jose Maria Santos
  10. Jaime Dimson
71. Solo Parents
  1. Jeremy Marquez
  2. Maggi Ortega
  3. Sherwin Lo
  4. Daniel Jason Sanchez
  5. Roquinmar John Obiedo
  6. Roselle Teodosio
  7. Julius Christian Sin
  8. Belgium Tandoc
  9. Jose Michael Meo Barrido
  10. Michael Stephen Lao
72. Ang Komadrona
  1. Arnel Guballa
  2. Fiona Margarita Aytona
  3. Alren Gabriel Guballa
  4. Dennis Gubala
  5. Franco Miguel Aytona
  6. Michael Raza
  7. Cecilia Santos
  8. Archie Relampagos Jr.
  9. Annie Georgina Go
  10. Danilo Belarmino Jr.
73. PROMDI (Abag PROMDI)
  1. Mariano Osmeña
  2. Niño Cinco
  3. Danilo Cinco
  4. Neil Labrador
  5. Richard Alcantara
  6. Jonathan George Uy
  7. Argy Milan
  8. Clariele Jerrina Osmeña
  9. Michael Matañoza
  10. Judee Mae Febra
74. Pusong Pinoy
  1. **Jernie Jett Nisay (incumbent)**
  2. Francisco Ramon Chan IV
  3. Antonio Samaniego
  4. Jude Beaver Chan
  5. Jacquilyn Roman
  6. Randy Rogelio
  7. Christopher Matienzo
  8. John Ronald Reynes
  9. Joseph Quindoza
  10. Maria Cecelia Mateo
75. Kusug Tausug
  1. **Aiman Tan**
  2. Mohammad Salmann Sakili
  3. Abdurasad Baih
  4. Michael Dan Valdopiera
  5. Hilda Maulurana
  6. Analyn Bless Woo
  7. Aisa Arang
  8. Mohammad Latip Bugay
  9. Abdulhakim Aud
  10. Nasser Abdua
76. Damayang Filipino (Damayang Filipino Movement)
  1. Athenie Ramirez-Bautista
  2. Noel Ramirez
  3. Nestor Fernando Siazon
  4. Anicia Marquez
  5. Mark Al Shinichiro Sato
  6. Rhehab Lauriano
  7. Artemio Bernil
  8. Maria Domingo
  9. Jhun Bailete dela Rosa
  10. Bonifacio Martin Sanchez
77. MPBL (Maharlikang Pilipino sa Bagong Lipunan)
  1. Ronwald Munsayac
  2. Jinkee Pacquiao
  3. Kenneth Duremdes
  4. Ildebrando Viernesto
  5. Armel Bernabe
  6. Miguel Antonio Almeda
  7. Steve Jumalon
  8. Alexander Bryan Reganit
  9. Evan Rebadulla
  10. Emmerson Oreta
78. Angat (Agrikultura Ngayon Gawing Akma at Tama)
  1. Ghizelle Jean Tamayo-Jimenea
  2. Kristine Joy Ozaeta
  3. Sittie Haynah Ibrahim
  4. Reynaldo Tamayo (incumbent)
  5. Arnold Guerrero
  6. Agustin Sardido III
  7. Milagros Tamayo
  8. Juanito Cabel
  9. Garry Canceran
  10. Adonis Sajo
79. Kalinga (Advocacy for Social Empowerment and Nation Building Through Easing Poverty)
  1. **Irene Gay Saulog (incumbent)**
  2. Uzziel Caponpon
  3. Benjamin Sico
  4. Ricel Garcia
  5. Michael Cruz
  6. Gladys Claire Rubonal
  7. Jacob Pascual
  8. Nick Medina
  9. Moises Cruz
  10. Hosanna Enriquez
80. Boses (Note: Boses was initially known as MOCHA (Mothers for Change).)
  1. Jose Adrian Sy Alvarado
  2. Joaquin Bilbao III
  3. Isabel Anne Torruos
  4. Mark Gabriel Salanga
  5. Rey Malinao
  6. Lebrico Baring Jr.
  7. Jovito Rodriguez
  8. Edwin Sulatre
  9. Candido Aparece Jr.
  10. Ronald Dagohoy
81. Arangkada Pilipino
  1. Aniceto Bertiz III
  2. Christopher Jerald Javier
  3. Manuelito Luna
  4. Aristotle Aguilar
  5. Yvez Franz Josef Bertiz
  6. Salimah Saudagar
  7. Sarah Gapas
  8. Jayson Javier
  9. Niña Lingal
  10. Cris Son Olisco
82. Aangat Tayo
  1. Daryl Grace Abayon
  2. Joseph Ignacio
  3. Gizelle Lou Cabahug-Fugoso
  4. Anjo Capoquian
  5. Melvin Abayon
  6. Reynaldo Madayag Jr.
  7. Rolly Roxas
  8. Rio Alyssa Sioson
  9. Jeranine Magro
  10. Carol Mae Simon
83. OFW (One Filipinos Worldwide)
  1. Marissa Magsino (incumbent)
  2. Raymond Wendell Adriano
  3. Princess Maria Adriano
  4. Jan Patricia Pin
  5. Aileen Jeshyl Peña
  6. Evangeline Jaehn
  7. Maricar Perez
  8. Aquinas Ranulph Hermida
  9. Ernita Santos
  10. Crisanto Laguardia Jr.
84. BIDA KATAGUMPAY (Bayan Itayo ang Dangal ng Agrikultura Kasama sa Tagumpay)
  1. Rolando Baliao
  2. Henstein Tan
  3. Carl Louie Lou Cruz
  4. Bernhard Ryan Muro
  5. Paolo Andrei Aggabao
  6. Klent Darren Magpantay
  7. Victorino Arellano Jr.
  8. Joseph Daniel Calingasan
  9. Romeo Deferia Jr.
  10. Levy Briton
85. KAMANGGAGAWA (Kampihan ng mga Maralita at Manggagawa)
  1. **Eli San Fernando**
  2. Cris Villonco
  3. Marco Elmer Cabrera
  4. Henric Jocson
  5. Reynaldo Mencias
  6. Reymond Gabriel
  7. Richie Ignacio
  8. John Mchael Bulilan
  9. Jesus Obien
  10. John Patrick Nunez
86. BFF (Balikatan of Filipino Families)
  1. Maria Presentacion Ejercito
  2. Rosario Lourdes Puno
  3. Joseph Luis Manuel Ejercito
  4. Ricardo Puno III
  5. Ericson Alcovendaz
  6. Isla Lapuz
  7. Milagros Manibale
  8. Rodolfo Puno Jr.
  9. Alfredo Alba
  10. Arnel Camacho
87. Bunyog (Bunyog (Pagkakaisa) Party)
  1. Ricky Tomotorgo
  2. Angelita Tamoria
  3. Maria Belinda Valencia-Sevalla
  4. Dick Torrijas
  5. Reinaldo Guillermo
  6. Vicente Barlos
  7. Myrna Aquino
  8. Teofilo Juatco
  9. Leonardo Millare
  10. Maria Teresa Lozada
88. AGRI (Agri-Agra na Reporma para sa Magsasaka ng Pilipinas)
  1. Delphine Lee
  2. Kevin Hennesy Ong
  3. Lea Prosperoso
  4. Daisy Gan
  5. Ricardo Gutierrez Jr.
  6. Nimfa Manrique
  7. Jonathan Neric
  8. Justin Bernard Loyola
  9. Telesforo Danilo Isidro Jr.
  10. Maria Gina Ignacio
89. Senior Citizens (Coalition of Associations of Senior Citizens in the Philippines)
  1. **Rodolfo Ordanes (incumbent)**
  2. Carmencita Lacson
  3. Alberto Pasiliao
  4. Bernadette Siochi
  5. Wilma Saavedra
  6. Noel Christopher Francisco
  7. Ethelinda Bobier
  8. Bella Balang
  9. Virgilio Lacson (incumbent (Note: Incumbent representative for the Manila Teachers party-list.))
  10. Cheryl Lynda Tantay
90. 4K (Kababaihan Kabalikatan para sa Kapakanan at Kaunlaran ng Bayan)
  1. **Iris Marie Montes**
  2. Glenda Alpuerto
  3. Melissa Tan
  4. Elma Matriano
  5. Maria Lucia Butardo
  6. Babylyn Enriquez Mirando
  7. Janine Maris Pabillar
  8. Kayla Mechell Arela
  9. Anita Liwanag
  10. Melody Segarra
91. PBP (Partido sa Bagong Pilipino)
  1. Gregorio Larrazabal
  2. Manuel Lopez Jr.
  3. Romeo Fortes
  4. Melo Esguerra Jr.
  5. William Amado Castaño
  6. Joaquin Yabut
  7. Samuel Roculas
  8. Esther Rama
  9. Baltazar Rosuello
  10. Mila Casimiro
92. One Coop (Aurora Integrated Multi-Purpose Cooperative)
  1. **Maria Kristina Jihan Glepa**
  2. Rodulfo Hilot Jr.
  3. Pacienciano Tomarong
  4. Melvin Tomarong
  5. Archillen Roda
  6. Peachie Undag
  7. Herbert Cabahug
  8. Digna Arnoza
  9. Evelyn Cimafranca
  10. Lily Ruth Panugan
93. CIBAC (Citizens' Battle Against Corruption)
  1. **Eddie Villanueva (incumbent)**
  2. Domingo Rivera
  3. Catherine Valencia
  4. Melquiades Asi
  5. Leonardo Alconga
  6. Armi Jane Borje
  7. Joshua Santa Lucia
  8. Jimmy Moises
  9. Christian Galang
  10. Virginia Jose
94. BH Bagong Henerasyon (Bagong Henerasyon)
  1. **Roberto Gerard Nazal Jr.**
  2. Rodolfo Medina
  3. Romeo Ernesto de Guzman
  4. Rochelle Custodio
  5. Maria Editha Alcantara
  6. Mariza Francisco
  7. Richie Aldover
  8. Pee Jay Pascasio
  9. Amando Magayanes
  10. Salvador Villena Jr.
95. 1Agila (1 Agila-Alalayang Agila para sa Bayan)
  1. Nelson Sarapuddin
  2. Mariel Dascil
  3. Soliven Teo
  4. Mariefe Sarapuddin
  5. Ramon Lacsamana Jr.
  6. Ulysses Kong
  7. Laudemer Marvin Sabado
  8. Shalemar Sarapuddin
  9. Darwin Asaali
  10. Lauro Mendoza
96. EduAKsyon
  1. Michael Alexander Ang
  2. Kristjan Vicente Gargantiel
  3. Aldrin Darilag
  4. Joanna Paola Ang
  5. Maria Preciosa Monica Ang
  6. Domingo Brum Jr.
  7. James del Valle
  8. Enrique Mendiola
  9. Miguel Alfonso Calma
  10. Danielle Ibojos
97. Ang Tinig ng Seniors (Ang Tinig ng Senior Citizens sa Filipinas)
  1. Carlo Aldeon
  2. Henry Capela
  3. Godofredo Arquiza
  4. Serafia Cobarrubias
  5. Alfonso Rivera
  6. Brenda Guilo
  7. Jonathan Atillo
  8. Maroja de Asis
  9. Myrna Manamtam
  10. Resurreccion Manuel
98. BG Party-List (Bisaya Gyud)
  1. Greco Belgica
  2. Carlos Quita
  3. Nazareno Belgica
  4. Niña Rizzi Belgica
  5. Reynaldo Valeros Jr.
  6. Jireh Bringas
  7. Jericho Labonete
  8. Jacob Canela
  9. Roman Legaspi
  10. Edelyn Ison
99. Pinoy Ako
  1. Christian Andrew Cruz
  2. Curlee Discaya
  3. Gil Valera
  4. Jazzie Ann Persia
  5. John Harvey Solanoy
  6. Jerry Panti
  7. Romulo Fernando
  8. Dennis Manansala Jr.
  9. Danilo Castillo
  10. Apollo Glenn Emas
100. H.E.L.P. Pilipinas (Health, Education, Livelihood Program of the Philippines)
  1. Mildred Vitangcol
  2. Florecita Gatpayat
  3. Antonio Salazar Jr.
  4. Celestino Jose Garcia Jr.
  5. Rainier Ona Jr.
  6. Henry Monzones
  7. Gabriel Mari Barretto Jr.
  8. Czar Oliver Tiu
  9. Francis Ong
  10. Johannes Villegas
101. Health Workers
  1. Robert Mendoza
  2. Maristela Abenojar
  3. Benigno Santi II
  4. Rose Mary Ann Solinap
  5. Julie Valerio-Passi
  6. Grace Torio-Aure
  7. Cyruz Tuppal
  8. Remedios Ysmael
  9. Jet Garcia
  10. Catherine Joyce Brillantes
102. Peoples Champ (Peoples Champ Guardians)
  1. Nicolas Enciso VIII
  2. Nora Aunor (withdrew (Note: Aunor withdrew as the second nominee of Peoples Champ and supported Kabayan instead.))
  3. Maria Cristina Borra
  4. Joseph Daryl Cabato
  5. Ricarido Espedillon
  6. Dondon Don
  7. Joseph Mortillo
  8. Eduardo Borromeo
  9. Eduardo Hildebrando Radan
  10. Jayson Wong
103. AA-Kasosyo (Kasosyo Producer-Consumer Exchange Association)
  1. Teodoro Pastrana
  2. Alvin dela Cruz
  3. Almen Pangandaman
  4. Louie Miguel de Leon
  5. Abram Benjamin Tutana
  6. Voltar Montaner
  7. Guillermo Intia
  8. Marilyn Macalagay
  9. Francia Sanin
  10. Marieta Magsombol
104. Solid North Party (Solidarity of Northern Luzon People)
  1. **Ching Bernos (incumbent (Note: Incumbent representative from Abra.))**
  2. Lucia Esperanza Valero
  3. Guillermo Ablan Jr.
  4. Michael Acosta
  5. Catherine Beronilla
  6. Marlon Riotoc
  7. Isidro Vasquez
  8. Roven Daryll Ramos
  9. Eric Pimienta
  10. Alvin Belaras
105. ABAMIN (Abante Mindanao)
  1. Maximo Rodriguez Jr.
  2. Rosevi Queenie Belmonte
  3. Dionisio Caballero
  4. Erlinda Oras
  5. Leonardo Bantilan
  6. Deogracias Bautista
  7. Clemente Fernandez
  8. Bernard Batucan
  9. Procuro Baiño Jr.
  10. Rolando Bacorro
106. TRABAHO (Tagapagtaguyod ng mga Reporma at Adhikaing Babalikat at Hahango sa mga Oportunidad para sa mga Pilipino)
  1. **Johanne Monich Bautista**
  2. Gianinna Czareena Chavez
  3. Nelson de Vega
  4. Juan Paulo Amador
  5. Gregorio Bilog IV
  6. Jonn Irvin Velasquez
  7. Laine Marie Bringuelo
  8. Charles Tito Aguilar
  9. Mitchell-David Espiritu
  10. Karlos Adolfo Caneda
107. ANGKASANGGA (Ang Kasangga ng Mangunguma-Owa Mangunguma)
  1. George Royeca
  2. Maria Victoria Genuino
  3. Lex Anthony Colada (incumbent (Note: Incumbent representative for the AAMBIS-OWA party-list.))
  4. Rhodora Jimenez
  5. Carlo Jauharo Castro
  6. David Brian Medrana
  7. Ibrahim Bernardo
  8. Francis Mark Lacuna
  9. Anja-Teresa Sofia Abrogar
  10. Arthur Rashed Hussain
108. TODA (Towards Development and Action)
  1. Rovin Andrew Feliciano
  2. Robert Angelo Esquivel
  3. Marc Louie Bautista
  4. Charles John Quimpo
  5. Omar Ryan Chua
  6. Glordon Serrano
  7. Jolina Paz Nicolas
  8. Benjamin Joseph Akol Jr.
  9. Martin Sean Go
  10. Rontristan Notado
109. Turismo (Turismo Isulong Mo)
  1. Wanda Tulfo Teo
  2. Dave Almarinez
  3. Robert Wren Teo
  4. Mark Glenn Melivo
  5. Maria Ana Nuguid
  6. Maria Luisa Diploma
  7. Lani Capuyan
  8. John Clyde Teves
  9. Edmond Mayormita
110. Abono
  1. **Robert Raymond Estrella** (incumbent)
  2. Ronald Allan So
  3. Antonio Muya
  4. Pillar Onia
  5. Eddie Patawaran
  6. Librada Flores
  7. Leonardo Bernabe
  8. Lito Arenas
  9. Liberato Cabigas
  10. Oftociano Manalo
111. ASAP NA (Alyansa Laban sa Substance Abuse para sa Bagong Pilipinas Natin)
  1. Amiel Rafaelo Toreja
  2. Zanjoe Marudo
  3. Alex Yap
  4. Valentin Lazo Jr.
  5. Ed Semira
  6. Jayson Montalbo
  7. Ruel Bonifacio
  8. John Paul Ganalon
  9. Lucas Bernardo Yan
  10. Jeanny Mantes
112. LINGAP (Liga ng Nagkakaisang Mahihirap)
  1. Norris John Okamoto
  2. Jennifer Rose Okamoto
  3. German Calimlim Jr.
  4. Benelyn Fernando
  5. Johnny Mariano
  6. Jose Abuso Jr.
  7. Jo-ann Therese Mariano
  8. Macario Topacio Jr.
  9. Jano Bryan Amandy
  10. John Peter Enriquez
113. United Frontliners
  1. Rhodel Sermonia
  2. Miguel Ortiz
  3. Connor Anthony Canlas
  4. Cherry Anne dela Cruz
  5. Arcie Fabon
  6. Joseph Ross Jocson
  7. Bryan Calagui
  8. Gloria Baguingan
  9. Rafael Galing Jr.
  10. Teresita Acosta
114. Kasambahay (Kasambahay Tayo)
  1. Chembeelyn Balucan
  2. Jose Nelher Palma
  3. Butch Jason Tormis
  4. Vic Lacaya III
  5. Stella Gonzales
  6. Genalin Jalosjos
  7. Fritzie Claire Tejada
  8. Julieta Tigo
  9. Archiebal Arizo
  10. Lilibeth Canilao
115. Tutok To Win
  1. Katrina Verzosa
  2. Samuel Verzosa III
  3. Niña Clara Verzosa
  4. Angelique Mae Verzosa
  5. Modesto Llamas Jr.
  6. Vanessa Camille Verzosa
  7. Maria Felicia Lorenza Verzosa
  8. Gerry Portillo
  9. Allan Tomimbang
  10. Magie Tomimbang
116. AKO OFW (Advocates & Keepers Organization of OFW)
  - Evangelista faction
    1. Celerino Umandap
    2. Marlon Valderama
    3. Maria Vince Joshua Mañalac
    4. Joseph Timothy Rivera
    5. Alfahmie Mustafa
    6. Cesar Gervacio
    7. Menandro Alcoba
    8. Lolita Gattuc
    9. Jayson Marticio
    10. Frederick Makasakit
  - Gonzales-Sadicon faction
    1. Florante Gerdan
    2. David Castillon
    3. Marcia Vicenta Gonzalez-Sadicon
    4. Reynaldo Santos Jr.
    5. Jay Lord Alden Estolas
    6. Efren Cadiz
    7. Jeanette Gotangogan
    8. Jan Hendrick Quizon
    9. Sidney Cuesta
    10. Reynard Leo Francisco
117. AGAP (Agricultural Sector Alliance of the Philippines)
  1. **Nicanor Briones (incumbent)**
  2. Arnielo Olandria
  3. Angelito Bagui
  4. Rolando Tambago
  5. Benjamin Jaro
  6. Edwin Macasaet
  7. Ysabel Gatmaitan
  8. Albert Alex Uson
  9. Francis Carlo Reyes
  10. Natalio Manalo
118. 1Tahanan
  1. **Nathaniel Oducado**
  2. Geraro Joseph Aliño
  3. Raul del Prado
  4. Elmer Catulpos
  5. Ymeir Shann Catulpos
  6. Yelcy Catulpos
  7. Alden Bacal
  8. Cresenciano Pedrola Jr.
  9. Erine Gale Dejecacion
  10. Reymond Buñag
119. Coop-NATCCO (Cooperative NATCCO Network Party)
  1. **Felimon Espares (incumbent)**
  2. Divina Quemi
  3. Jose Agerico de Guzman
  4. Jovita Conales
  5. Bienvenido Larosa
  6. Noel Quidilla
  7. Glenn Tajanlangit
  8. Nenita Bacister
  9. Ruth Jacutin
  10. Ramil Santos
120. Kabayan (Kabalikat ng Mamamayan)
  1. Jewehl Gay Salo
  2. Paul Hernandez
  3. Patricia Gomez
  4. Noemie Bustamante
  5. Crisaldo Natividad
  6. Benito Lacaden
  7. Fernando Elesio
  8. Harlim de la Mance
  9. Melchor Villegas
  10. Jennis Nidea
121. 1Munti
  1. Rafael Alfonso Garcia
  2. Nicanor Echavez
  3. Jo Jason Alcaraz
  4. Marco Ginno Yoro
  5. Jose Chua
  6. Gabriel Limjoco
  7. Debbie Bartolo
  8. Lee Francis Tajonera
  9. Paolo Angelo Trillo
  10. Michelle Sison
122. Pinoy Workers (People Working for the Development of the Philippines)
  1. **Franz Vincent Legazpi**
  2. Ralph Julius Santos
  3. Tirso Escobar
  4. Kaydee Marie Velasco
  5. Anne Clarice Ng
  6. Jose Fernando Escalante
  7. Alvin Ace Melano
  8. Prudencio Denis Batoy Jr.
  9. Arianne Tampoy
  10. J. Paolo Angelo Saycon
123. API Party (Abante Pangasinan Ilokano Party)
  1. Amado Espino Jr.
  2. Nelson Gayo
  3. Amadeo Espino
  4. Felipe de Vera
  5. Roslin Sinlao
  6. Jose Roderick Javier
  7. Erickson Bermachea
  8. Melchor Abriam
  9. Enrico Siahon
  10. Christopher Orpilla
124. Ako Bisaya
  1. **Sonny Lagon (incumbent)**
  2. Maria Estella Carissa Codilla
  3. Kristin Ann Lagrimas
  4. Maria Kara Copingco
  5. Eufracio Palomar III
  6. Mae Elaine Bathan
  7. Gilbert Go
  8. Maria Marla Ohayas
  9. Jonathan Nacua
  10. Evan Ledesma
125. Kamalayan (Kamalayan ng Maralita at Malayang Mamamayan)
  1. **Caroline Tanchay (incumbent (Note: Incumbent representative for the Sagip party-list.))**
  2. Jellaine Bernice Yao
  3. Datu Nur Ali Midtimbang
  4. Louelalyn Adelante
  5. Nolito Ladroma
  6. Fermar Tabigne
  7. Maria Rhea Imperio
  8. Vincent Bartolaba
  9. Frederick Gopiteo
  10. Roderick Oliveros
126. Ako Tanod
  1. Christopher Baldo
  2. Cirilo Basalo Jr.
  3. Ramil Joselito Tamayo
  4. Joselito Sarigumba
  5. Cyrene Joy Baldo
  6. Jose Jeremy Soldevilla
  7. Rose Marie Amansce
  8. Maximino Patag
  9. Richard Ygat
  10. Jhon Dollero
127. Probinsyano Ako
  1. Rudys Caesar Fariñas (incumbent)
  2. Jose Singson Jr.
  3. Pacifico Gorospe
  4. Suzanne Bueno
  5. Jessie Richard Calapini
  6. Guillermo Ancheta
  7. Francisco Castro
  8. Estelito Garalde
  9. Teresita dela Cruz
  10. Faustino Pinacate
128. Kababaihan (Hanay ng mga Kababaihan at Kanilang mga Kasangga sa Lipunan)
  1. Kate Abigael Galang-Coseteng
  2. Ria Romualdo
  3. Carolyn Cabiling
  4. Margarita Garcia
  5. Maria Kathreen Mallari-Barrientos
  6. Melba Ramento
  7. Alona Lopez
  8. Cecilia de Guzman
  9. Perlin Cascabel
  10. Catherine Ramirez
129. RAM (Rebolusyonaryong Alyansang Makabansa)
  1. Teodoro Camacho IV
  2. Ramon Yogyog
  3. Ameurfina Maligalig
  4. Roberto Rocio
  5. Alfredo Andres
  6. Florencio Flores
  7. Pablo Casalme
  8. Jose Enrico Leonardo Ruiz
  9. Gregor Mendel Panelo
  10. Edilfredo Adeva
130. ALONA (Alliance of Organizations, Networks and Associations of the Philippines)
  1. **Maria Cristina Lopez**
  2. Hamza Dimaporo
  3. Dan Hill Garcia
  4. Janice Pasahol
  5. Jenziel Marie Lastimosa
  6. Maria Katrina Ruiz
  7. Maria Theresa Aro
  8. Maria Lualhati Ang
  9. Martiniano Quizon Jr.
  10. Aristeo Portes
131. Ako Bicol (Ako Bicol Political Party)
  1. **Elizaldy Co (incumbent)**
  2. **Alfredo Garbin Jr.**
  3. Jan Franz Norbert Joselito Chan
  4. Mary Grace Rementina
  5. Raiya Angela Azanza
  6. Robert Jhon Salazar
  7. Anelyn Sumanga
  8. Melinda Ebio
  9. Cherryl Barrios
  10. Jo Paulo Espiritu
132. GP (Galing sa Puso)
  1. **Jan Rurik Padiernos**
  2. Jose Gay Padiernos (incumbent)
  3. Bernadette de Vera
  4. Rodolfo Antonino
  5. Gerald Chua
  6. Jan Adrian Padiernos
  7. Maria Victoria Umali
  8. Arman Raquel-Santos
  9. Armand Jason Carandang
  10. Amelito Medallo
133. Kaunlad Pinoy (Kaisipang Positibo para sa Kaunlaran ng Pilipino)
  1. James Christopher Napoles
  2. Ricky Juab
  3. Nico Robert Martin
  4. Washington Plaza
  5. Zenaida Pama
  6. Juan Carlos Pagunsan
  7. Francis Amado Lim
  8. John Lasugas
  9. Jodee Dequilla
  10. Andrew Jimenez
134. ABP (Ang Bumbero ng Pilipinas)
  - Goitia faction
    1. Jose Antonio Goitia
    2. Jose Mari Alfonzo Goitia
    3. Leninsky Bacud (Note: Assassinated on April 28, 2025)
    4. Carl Gene Plantado
    5. Darwin Fernandez
    6. Catleya Cher Goitia
    7. Roldan Cidro
    8. Howie Manga
    9. Allenkkovik Bacud
    10. Roldan Cidro Jr.
  - Umandap faction
    1. Astravel Pimentel-Naik
    2. Arnold Umandap
    3. Brad Boie Peter Cheung
    4. Antonette Hosenilla
    5. Joana Marie Villafranca
    6. Nowell Neri
    7. Gilson Custodio
    8. Myrine Miña
    9. Romnick Angkico
    10. Ceries Glean
135. CWS (Construction Workers Solidarity)
  1. **Tirso Edwin Gardiola (incumbent)**
  2. Melanie Joy Guno
  3. Emmanuel Pelaez
  4. Edward Raymond Esguerra
  5. Jose Rocesvalles
  6. Ivaree Genine Bolaños
  7. Melvin Mallo
  8. Jelly-wyn Bangit
  9. John Paul Santiago
  10. Mark Rabie Guanzon
136. LPGMA (LPG Marketers Association)
  1. **Allan Ty (incumbent)**
  2. Arnel Ty
  3. Rowie Orquita
  4. Miguelito Bernal Jr.
  5. Maria Angelica Tolentino
  6. Henry Encila
  7. Anson Robin Ponce
  8. Marivic Uy
  9. Josephine Becoy
  10. Vivian Punzalan
137. A TEACHER (Advocacy for Teacher Empowerment Through Action Cooperation and Harmony Towards Educational Reform)
  1. Julieta Cortuna
  2. Edgardo Avengonzar Jr.
  3. Virginia Rodriguez
  4. Ryan Taclan
  5. Sophia Maguid
  6. Teodora Camins
  7. Elaine Orong
  8. Remedios Villlamor
  9. Roel Mendi
  10. James Cometa
138. SWERTE (Solo Parent Working for Economic Rights and Other Thrusts for Equality)
  1. **Arlyn Ayon**
  2. Nemesio Beltran Jr.
  3. Ramir Roque
  4. Arniejay Ayon
  5. Hernane Ayon
  6. Arneli Duhaylungsod
  7. Kara James Marcelo
  8. Aremie Sarigumba
  9. Juanito de Asis Jr.
  10. Gemymah Sylvia Victorio
139. Gabay (Gabay Ugnayan para sa Reporma at Oportunidad)
  1. Elmer Dimayuga
  2. Christopher Robin Sojua
  3. Clarence Lopez
  4. Roman Francis Ferrer
  5. Rosgene Timonan
  6. Remedios Bautista
  7. Babylyn Ey
  8. Milton John Sojua
  9. Edgar Allain Quinones
  10. Dalton Balidoy
140. Malasakit@Bayanihan (Malasakit at Bayanihan Foundation)
  1. **Girlie Veloso**
  2. Jade Jamolod
  3. Reveree Niño Contreras
  4. Christian Arrieta
  5. Marites Caindec
  6. Zaide Lim
  7. Marvin Mijares
  8. Christine Airah Diata Cruz
  9. Dennison Jan Lim
  10. Ronald Reagan Talavera
141. Akay ni Sol (Akay ni Solusyon Organisasyon at Laban)
  1. Lilia Jocylyn Cadano
  2. Jeanette Enduma
  3. Aida Sadiaza
  4. Katharine May Muñoz
  5. Josefina dela Cruz
  6. Eric Ramirez
  7. Joana Marie Aquino
  8. Gerwin Torrente
  9. Joyce Anne Pimentel
  10. Melwin Gio Catarroja
142. LUNAS (Lungsod Aasenso)
  1. Carol Jayne Lopez
  2. Noel Dizon
  3. Jaime Garcia
  4. James Tripoli
  5. Rhonda Felizmeña
  6. Rc Joy Panis
  7. Olicar dela Vega
  8. Jerlyn Natibo-oc
  9. Barno Taguinod
  10. Joedhet Ann Tañga
143. DIWA (Democratic Independent Workers Association)
  1. Michael Edgar Aglipay
  2. Ambrosio Lambus Jr.
  3. Leopoldo Blanco Jr.
  4. Angeline Bordonada
  5. Ginger Aglipay
  6. Jameselle Quinola
  7. Camille Dominique Pactol
  8. Jai Noreena Balili
  9. Jenny Megia
  10. Michael Angelo Datuin
144. PINUNO (Pinatatag na Ugnayan para sa mga Oportunidad sa Pabahay ng Masa)
  1. Ida Guintu
  2. Deceriz Labrador
  3. Evelyn Majabague
  4. Susana Nonato
  5. Lilibeth Palma
  6. Lutchille Sunga
  7. Edwin Abendaño
  8. Imelda Edovas
  9. Jed Palomar
  10. May Malle
145. Pamilya Muna (Ang Pamilya Muna)
  1. Mariano Michael Velarde
  2. Rene Velarde
  3. Danielle Marie Palami
  4. Crisanto Villamin
  5. Wilfrido Villarama
  6. Rafael de los Reyes
  7. Maria Jocelyn Barles
  8. Dennis Herminio Frias
  9. Sheene Arnulfo Sales
  10. Ramona Formentos
146. Bagong Pilipinas (Bagong Maunlad na Pilipinas)
  1. Alfredo Bayan
  2. Ariel Gumban
  3. Pablita Go
  4. James Cayabyab
  5. Elma Tan
  6. Michael Bisagas
  7. Daniel Valenzuela
  8. Ronniel Manumbale
  9. Filomena Dilao
  10. Erlinda Hipolito
147. Hugpong Federal (Hugpong Federal Movement of the Philippines)
  1. Thelma Zerrudo
  2. Kate Anne Jaculina
  3. Ferdinand dela Rama
  4. Tahira Asanji
  5. Crizalou Melquiades
  6. Paolo Valencia
  7. Jinky Concepcion Iguidez
  8. Madeleine Ong
  9. Gina Portern
  10. Imelda Tabunan
148. Tupad
  1. Rossini Stallion Mikaelo Lu
  2. Bayani Agbayani
  3. Jordan Andrew Lim
  4. Lorabel Olano
  5. Rosario Simbahan
  6. Ireneo Bulandoz Jr.
  7. Jerry-Sel Manansala
  8. Michael Arl-Joe Manansala
  9. Angeli Manalang
  10. Jayson Faustino Manansala IV
149. Laang Kawal (Laang Kawal ng Pilipinas)
  1. Jaime Roberto Almario
  2. Noel Detoyato
  3. Jannette Chavez-Arceo
  4. Gaudencio Eleazar Manalac
  5. Gilmar Galicia
  6. John Evans Galan
  7. Luisito Montemayor
  8. Francisco Dimalanta
  9. Diosdado Paji
  10. Virgilio Leoncio Lomotan
150. Pamilya Ko
  1. Aeneas Eli Diaz
  2. Miguel Antonio Kallos
  3. Rafael Antonio Belmonte
  4. John Domantay
  5. Timoteo Lamodoc
  6. Manuel Ozamis Jr.
  7. Manuel Ozamis
  8. Daisy Anticristo
  9. Lorenzo Philip Ojeda
  10. Gwendolyn Masaoka
151. BBM (Bangon Bagong Minero)
  1. Carlo Antonio Co
  2. Enrique dela Cruz Jr.
  3. Ryan Rene Jornada
  4. Narciso Bravo Jr.
  5. Rodric Hang
  6. Hester Hennelly See
  7. Christopher Antonio Co
  8. Shandy Lester Say
  9. Tonee Charmaine Hang
  10. Tonee Lynn See
152. Heal PH (Health Alliance PH)
  1. Jonathan David Flavier
  2. Enrique Tayag
  3. Benito Antonio de Leon
  4. Andrew Jimenez
  5. Romulo Busuego
  6. Mariano Mejia
  7. Jose Duran
  8. Edison Choa
  9. Joseph Allan Aguilar
  10. Nicolas Lutero III
153. Abang Lingkod
  1. Manuel Frederick Ko
  2. Richard Julius Sablan
  3. Pedro Limpangog
  4. Nursoud Abing
  5. Delmark Ramos
  6. George Arnel Piso
  7. Joelito Bodios
  8. Rolando Villanueva
  9. Mario Jurada
  10. Zacarias Calo
154. MAGSASAKA (Magkakasama sa Sakahan, Kaunlaran)
  - Cabatbat faction
    1. Leonardo Montemayor
    2. George Cabatbat
    3. Rafael Naral
    4. Reynaldo dela Peña
    5. Dante Lazatin
    6. Mario Palacay
    7. Henry Colannay
    8. Dennis Zuñiga
    9. Hernane Abela
    10. Robert Rayman
  - Cortez faction
    1. Joel Lopez
    2. Emiliano Gutierrez Jr.
    3. Isagani Giron
    4. Debold Sinas
    5. Jupiter Dominguez
    6. Richton Natividad
    7. Elanie Capili
    8. Joren Obumani
    9. Mark Anthony Garcia
    10. Doroteo Cunanan III
  - Du faction
    1. Ariel Cayanan
    2. Jose Dennis Requilman
    3. Lejun dela Cruz
    4. Bennylyn Capalad
    5. Joel Gepaya
    6. Roy Dinagsao
    7. Wilmar Nalupa
    8. Luisito Pumaras
    9. Victorino Reyes
    10. Maria Cristina Dalupang
  - Lasay faction
    1. Revor Lasay
    2. Mary Louise Reyes
    3. Fatani Abdul Malik
    4. Jesus Calisin
    5. Jacinto Hashim Obre
    6. Roberto dela Cerna
    7. Raul Barcela
    8. Edgardo Espallardo
    9. Dindo Mijares
    10. Virgilio Raro
155. Maharlika (Maharlikang Pilipino Party)
  1. Rosalie Ballon
  2. Alvin Sahagun
  3. Ruben Flor
  4. Carlos Villarias
  5. Marie Liza Chagas-Fallorin
  6. James Arthur Jimenez
  7. George Salvador
  8. Lorenzo Hormillosa Jr.
  9. May Viuya
  10. Jerry Sahagun
156. Uswag Ilonggo
  1. **James Ang Jr. (incumbent)**
  2. Maria Lourdes Miraflores
  3. Jerry Opinion
  4. Jocelyn Tan
  5. Anita Buñi
  6. Genevieve Salcedo
  7. Cris Marie Angelie Español
  8. Jeric Jucaban
  9. Reynaldo Pelongco
  10. Alfredo Arungayan III

== Withdrawals ==
One party withdrew after ballots were initially printed. Due to withdrawals on other races, a new set of ballots were printed, with this party's ballot number skipped.

58. Wage Hike (Note: Withdrew on December 12, 2024.) (Partido Trabaho at Wage Hike)
  1. Rainier Butalid
  2. Justine Kyle Mapalo
  3. Keefe Eldrik dela Cruz
  4. Jasper James Valencia
  5. Briant Allen Rosario
  6. Amando Jayona III
  7. Pray Heart Lumabao
  8. Jorgianna Bagaman
  9. Sean Roman Callanta
  10. Maria Raquel Lynda Callanta
