= Philippine House Committee on Accounts =

Standing committee of the House of Representatives of the Philippines

Committee on Accounts
- House of Representatives of the Philippines; 20th Congress

History
- New session started: July 28, 2025

Leadership
- Chair: Maricar Zamora (PFP) since July 29, 2025
- Senior minority member: Arylyn Ayon (SWERTE) since August 12, 2025

Structure
- Seats: 60
- Political groups: Majority (51): Lakas (20); Party-lists (9); PFP (8); NUP (6); NPC (5); Nacionalista (2); MKTZNU (1); Minority (3): Party-lists (2); NUP (1); Vacant (4): Vacant (Note: Unfilled seats) (4)

Website
- Committee on Accounts

The Philippine House Committee on Accounts, or House Accounts Committee is a standing committee of the Philippine House of Representatives.

== Jurisdiction ==
As prescribed by House Rules, the committee's jurisdiction is on the internal budget of the House which includes the following:

- Accounting
- Budget preparation
- Disbursements
- Financial operations
- Submission and approval

== Members, 20th Congress ==
Since July 29, 2025
Majority	Minority
Maricar Zamora (Davao de Oro–1st, PFP), Chair	Arylyn Ayon (SWERTE, Party-list)
Yedda Romualdez (Tingog, Party-list), Senior Vice Chair	Sheen Gonzales (Eastern Samar at-large, NUP)
Emmarie Dizon (Mandaue at-large, Lakas), Vice Chair	Roberto Nazal Jr. (BH, Party-list)
Alfredo Marañon III (Negros Occidental–2nd, NUP), Vice Chair	
Eleandro Jesus Madrona (Romblon at-large, Nacionalista), Vice Chair	
Jonathan Keith Flores (Bukidnon–2nd, Lakas), Vice Chair	
Doris Maniquiz (Zambales–2nd, Lakas), Vice Chair	
Marivic Co-Pilar (Quezon City–6th, NUP), Vice Chair	
Gina de Venecia (Pangasinan–4th, Lakas), Vice Chair	
Cristy Angeles (Tarlac–2nd, PFP), Vice Chair	
Miguel Luis Villafuerte (Camarines Sur–5th, NUP), Vice Chair	
Dinand Hernandez (South Cotabato–2nd, PFP)	
Junard Chan (Lapu-Lapu City at-large, PFP)	
Jose Manuel Lagdameo (Davao del Norte–2nd, PFP)	
Florabel Yatco (Nanay, Party-list)	
Rhea Gullas (Cebu–1st, Lakas)	
Eduardo Rama Jr. (Cebu City–2nd, Lakas)	
Jolo Revilla (Cavite–1st, Lakas)	
Jhong Ceniza (Davao de Oro–2nd, Lakas)	
De Carlo Uy (Davao del Norte–1st, Lakas)	
Claudine Bautista-Lim (DUMPER PTDA, Party-list)	
Vanvan Aumentado (Bohol–2nd, Lakas)	
Maria Rachel Arenas (Pangasinan–3rd, Lakas)	
Jason Almonte (Misamis Occidental–1st, Nacionalista)	
Josefina Tallado (Camarines Norte–1st, NPC)	
Jose Aquino II (Butuan at-large, Lakas)	
Jurdin Jesus Romualdo (Camiguin at-large, Lakas)	
Nelson Dayanghirang Jr. (Davao Oriental–1st, Lakas)	
Dean Asistio (Caloocan–3rd, Lakas)	
Jojo Ang (Uswag Ilonggo, Party-list)	
Luigi Villafuerte (Camarines Sur–2nd, NUP)	
Alexandria Gonzales (Mandaluyong at-large, NUP)	
Jude Acidre (Tingog, Party-list)	
Andrew Julian Romualdez (Tingog, Party-list)	
Sonny Lagon (Ako Bisaya, Party-list)	
Jose Teves Jr. (TGP, Party-list)	
Salvador Pleyto (Bulacan–6th, PFP)	
Christopherson Yap (Southern Leyte–2nd, Lakas)	
Anna Veloso-Tuazon (Leyte–3rd, NUP)	
Carl Cari (Leyte–5th, Lakas)	
Roger Mercado (Southern Leyte–1st, NPC)	
Lolita Javier (Leyte–2nd, NPC)	
Binky April Tupas (Iloilo–5th, Lakas)	
Samantha Santos (Cotabato–3rd, Lakas)	
Johanne Monich Bautista (TRABAHO, Party-list)	
Alden Almario (Makati–2nd, MKTZNU)	
Giselle Lazaro-Maceda (Manila–4th, NPC)	
Emmanuel Iway (Negros Oriental–1st, PFP)	
Bong Rivera (Tarlac–3rd, NPC)	
Ann Matibag (Laguna–1st, PFP)	
Dimple Mastura (Maguindanao del Norte at-large, Lakas)	

== Historical membership rosters ==
Party affiliations shown are those held by the members at the end of the Congress.

=== 19th Congress ===
July 26, 2022 - June 30, 2025
Majority	Minority
Yedda Romualdez (Tingog, Party-list), Chair	Wilbert T. Lee (AGRI Partylist, Party-list)
Angelo Barba (Ilocos Norte–2nd, Nacionalista), Vice Chair	Rodge Gutierrez (1-Rider, Party-list)
Lorna Silverio (Bulacan–3rd, NUP), Vice Chair	Marissa Magsino (OFW, Party-list)
Florida Robes (San Jose del Monte at-large, PFP), Vice Chair	Harris Ongchuan (Northern Samar–2nd, NUP)
Eleandro Jesus Madrona (Romblon at-large, Nacionalista), Vice Chair	Reynolds Michael Tan (Samar–2nd, Lakas)
Angelica Natasha Co (BHW, Party-list), Vice Chair	
Rosanna Vergara (Nueva Ecija–3rd, PFP), Vice Chair	
Maricar Zamora (Davao de Oro–1st, Lakas), Vice Chair	
Anna Suarez (ALONA, Party-list), Vice Chair	
Tonypet Albano (Isabela–1st, Lakas)	
Jojo Ang (Uswag Ilonggo, Party-list)	
Maria Rachel Arenas (Pangasinan–3rd, Lakas)	
Vanvan Aumentado (Bohol–2nd, Lakas)	
Alan Dujali (Davao del Norte–2nd, Lakas)	
Francisco Jose Matugas II (Surigao del Norte–1st, Lakas)	
Migs Nograles (PBA, Party-list)	
Jolo Revilla (Cavite–1st, Lakas)	
Laarni Roque (Bukidnon–4th, Nacionalista)	
Gustavo Tambunting (Parañaque–2nd, NUP)	
Christopherson Yap (Southern Leyte–2nd, Lakas)	
Janice Salimbangon (Cebu–4th, NUP)	
Romeo Momo (Surigao del Sur–1st, Nacionalista)	
Jose Aquino II (Agusan del Norte–1st, Lakas)	
Raul Tupas (Iloilo–5th, Lakas)	
Eric Buhain (Batangas–1st, Nacionalista)	
Alfred delos Santos (Ang Probinsyano, Party-list)	
Claudine Bautista-Lim (DUMPER PTDA, Party-list)	
Ace Barbers (Surigao del Norte–2nd, Nacionalista)	
Alfredo Marañon III (Negros Occidental–2nd, NUP)	
Janette Garin (Iloilo–1st, Lakas)	
Samantha Santos (Cotabato–3rd, Lakas)	
Emmarie Dizon (Mandaue at-large, Lakas)	
Juliet Marie Ferrer (Negros Occidental–4th, NUP)	
Dean Asistio (Caloocan–3rd, Lakas)	
Tina Pancho (Bulacan–2nd, NUP)	
Sonny Lagon (Ako Bisaya, Party-list)	
Daphne Lagon (Cebu–6th, Lakas)	
Mark Go (Baguio at-large, Nacionalista)	
Rihan Sakaluran (Sultan Kudarat–1st, Lakas)	
Anna Veloso-Tuazon (Leyte–3rd, NUP)	
Dimple Mastura (Maguindanao del Norte at-large, (Note: Dimple Mastura represented Maguindanao's 1st district until September 18, 2022.) Lakas)	
Patrick Michael Vargas (Quezon City–5th, Lakas)	
Lucille Nava (Guimaras at-large, NUP)	
Carl Cari (Leyte–5th, Lakas)	
Len Alonte (Biñan at-large, Lakas)	
Gerardo Espina Jr. (Biliran at-large, Lakas)	
Jude Acidre (Tingog, Party-list)	
Anthony Golez (Malasakit@Bayanihan, Party-list)	
Mitzi Cajayon (Caloocan–2nd, Lakas)	
Inno Dy (Isabela–6th, Lakas)	
Christopher de Venecia (Pangasinan–4th, Lakas)	
Jurdin Jesus Romualdo (Camiguin at-large, Lakas)	
Edward Maceda (Manila–4th, NPC)	
Rolan Valeriano (Manila–2nd, NUP)	

=== 18th Congress ===
July 24, 2019 - June 30, 2022
Majority	Minority
Paolo Duterte (Davao City–1st, HNP), Chair	Isagani Amatong (Zamboanga del Norte–3rd, Liberal)
Eileen Ermita-Buhain (Batangas–1st, Nacionalista), Vice Chair	Angelica Natasha Co (BHW, Party-list)
Yedda Romualdez (Tingog, Party-list), Vice Chair	Gabriel Bordado (Camarines Sur–3rd, Liberal)
Lorna Silverio (Bulacan–3rd, NUP), Vice Chair	Ma. Victoria Umali (A Teacher, Party-list)
Naealla Bainto Aguinaldo (Bahay, Party-list), Vice Chair	Irene Gay Saulog (Kalinga, Party-list)
Ace Barbers (Surigao del Norte–2nd, Nacionalista), Vice Chair	
Divina Grace Yu (Zamboanga del Sur–1st, PDP–Laban), Vice Chair	
Florida Robes (San Jose del Monte at-large, PDP–Laban), Vice Chair	
Kristine Singson-Meehan (Ilocos Sur–2nd, NPC), Vice Chair	
Eric Yap (ACT-CIS, Party-list), Vice Chair	
Juliet Marie Ferrer (Negros Occidental–4th, NUP)	
Tonypet Albano (Isabela–1st, Lakas)	
Rolan Valeriano (Manila–2nd, NUP)	
Horacio Suansing Jr. (Sultan Kudarat–2nd, NUP)	
Franz Josef Alvarez (Palawan–1st, NUP)	
Alyssa Sheena Tan (Isabela–4th, PDP–Laban)	
Allen Jesse Manaogang (Kalinga at-large, Nacionalista)	
Jocelyn Fortuno (Camarines Sur–5th, Nacionalista)	
Eleandro Jesus Madrona (Romblon at-large, Nacionalista)	
Rogelio Neil Roque (Bukidnon–4th, PRP)	
Eduardo Gullas (Cebu–1st, Nacionalista)	
Raul Tupas (Iloilo–5th, Nacionalista)	
Joseph Bernos (Abra at-large, Nacionalista)	
Estrellita Suansing (Nueva Ecija–1st, PDP–Laban)	
Michael Gorriceta (Iloilo–2nd, Nacionalista)	
Angelo Barba (Ilocos Norte–2nd, Nacionalista)	
Alfred Vargas (Quezon City–5th, PDP–Laban)	
Olga Kho (Masbate–2nd, PDP–Laban)	
Josefina Tallado (Camarines Norte–1st, PDP–Laban)	
Anthony Peter Crisologo (Quezon City–1st, Lakas)	
Rolando Uy (Cagayan de Oro–1st, NUP)	
Sandra Eriguel (La Union–2nd, Lakas)	
Francisco Benitez (Negros Occidental–3rd, PDP–Laban)	
Carl Cari (Leyte–5th, PDP–Laban)	
Jonathan Keith Flores (Bukidnon–2nd, Nacionalista)	
Bem Noel (An Waray, Party-list)	
Jose Gay Padiernos (GP, Party-list)	
Alfred delos Santos (Ang Probinsyano, Party-list)	
Romeo Momo (CWS, Party-list)	
Sandro Gonzalez (Marino, Party-list)	
Michael Edgar Aglipay (DIWA, Party-list)	
Sonny Lagon (Ako Bisaya, Party-list)	
Christian Unabia (Misamis Oriental–1st, Lakas)	
Paz Radaza (Lapu-Lapu City at-large, Lakas)	
Allan Benedict Reyes (Quezon City–3rd, NPC)	
Pablo Ortega (La Union–1st, NPC)	
Cheryl Deloso-Montalla (Zambales–2nd, NPC)	
Abdullah Dimaporo (La Union–1st, NPC)	
Jun Gato (Batanes at-large, NPC)	
Cesar Jimenez Jr. (Zamboanga City–1st, NPC)	
Solomon Chungalao (Ifugao at-large, NPC)	
Peter John Calderon (Cebu–7th, NPC)	
Dahlia Loyola (Cavite–5th, NPC)	
Noel Villanueva (Tarlac–3rd, NPC)	
Luis Campos (Makati–2nd, NPC)	
Mike Dy III (Isabela–5th, NPC)	
Gerardo Valmayor Jr. (Negros Occidental–1st, NPC)	
John Rey Tiangco (Negros Occidental–1st, Navoteño)	
Josephine Lacson-Noel (Malabon at-large, NPC)	
Diego Ty (Misamis Occidental–1st, NUP)	
Micaela Violago (Nueva Ecija–2nd, NUP)	
Manuel Zamora (Davao de Oro–1st, HNP)	
Hector Sanchez (Catanduanes at-large, Lakas)	
Frederick Siao (Iligan at-large, Nacionalista)	
Sol Aragones (Laguna–3rd, Nacionalista)	
Lucille Nava (Guimaras at-large, PDP–Laban)	
Yul Servo (Manila–3rd, Aksyon)	
Jose Teves Jr. (TGP, Party-list)	
Ansaruddin Alonto Adiong (Lanao del Sur–1st, Nacionalista)	

==== Chairperson ====
- Abraham Tolentino (Cavite–8th, NUP), July 24, 2019 – October 13, 2020

==== Member for the Majority ====
- Marisol Panotes (Note: Died on April 29, 2022.) (Camarines Norte–2nd, PDP–Laban)

== See also ==
- House of Representatives of the Philippines
- List of Philippine House of Representatives committees
