= Marie Josephine Calatrava =

Filipino politician (born 1981)

- Calatrava certificate of candidacy photo in 2024

Member of Philippine House of Representatives for Tingog Party List
- In office June 30, 2025 – July 9, 2025

Personal details
- Born: Marie Josephine Diana Kittilstvedt
- Party: Tingog (party-list; 2025–present)
- Spouse: Terence Calatrava
- Parents: Joseph Kittilstvedt (father); Maria Yedda Mendoza (mother)
- Relatives: Yedda Romualdez (sister)
- Nickname: Happy

Marie Josephine Diana "Happy" Kittilstvedt-Calatrava is a Filipino businesswoman and politician who served as the representative of Tingog Party List in the Philippine House of Representatives from June to July 2025.

Calatrava was the third nominee of Tingog Party List for the 2025 party-list election to the House of Representatives. Tingog placed third, gaining 1,822,708 votes and three congressional seats. She was sworn in as representative, alongside the party's first and second nominees, Andrew Julian Romualdez and Jude Acidre.

On July 9, 2025, Calatrava announced her resignation as a House member due to unspecified personal reasons, together with fourth nominee Alexis Yu and fifth nominee Paul Muncada. They were succeeded by the sixth nominee, her sister Yedda Romualdez, the wife of then-House speaker Martin Romualdez, on July 18, 2025.

Calatrava is a member of the board of directors of the Philippine Veterans Bank.

She is married to Terence Calatrava, a former undersecretary of the Office of the Presidential Assistant for the Visayas.

== Electoral history ==
Electoral history of Marie Josephine Calatrava
Year	Office	Party	Votes received				Result
Year	Office	Party	Total	%	P.	Swing	Result
2025	Representative (Party-list)	Tingog	1,822,708	4.60%	3rd	—N/a	Won
