= ARISE (political party) =

Regional political party in the Philippines

Alliance for Resilience, Sustainability and Empowerment
- President: Arze Glipo
- Ideology: Agrarianism; Social Justice

The Alliance for Resilience, Sustainability, and Empowerment (ARISE) is a Philippine regional political organization based in the Bicol Region.

== Ideology ==
ARISE advocates for the protection of the agriculture sector and allied industries, as well as the representation of marginzalized sectors.

== Political Activities ==
In 2021, ARISE faced accreditation challenges from the COMELEC but secured a temporary restraining order (TRO) from the Supreme Court, allowing the group to remain on the ballot.

In the 2022 Philippine Senate election, ARISE publicly supported the senatorial candidacy of Francis Escudero.

== Election Results ==
Election year	Votes	Percentage	Seats won
2025	26,565	0.07%	0
2022	20,131	0.06%	0
