= Kamalayan Partylist =

Political party in the Philippines

Kamalayan
- — Philippine partylist —
- Full name: Kalipunan ng Maralita at Malayang Mamamayan, Inc.
- Colors: Green

Current representation (20th Congress)
- Seats in the House of Representatives: 1 / 3 (Out of 63 party-list seats)
- Representative(s): Caroline Tanchay

Kalipunan ng Maralita at Malayang Mamamayan, Inc., also known as the Kamalayan Partylist, is a political organization with party-list representation in the House of Representatives of the Philippines.

== Electoral history ==
Kamalayan participated in the 2022 elections and had the advantage of being listed first in the ballot among partylist candidates. They ran pledging to combat poverty in the Philippines if elected. They did not win a seat. Kamalayan ran again in 2025 elections and won one seat.

== Political stance ==
Kamalayan declares healthcare and education issues as its main platforms. It names the indigents as its constituents.

== Representatives to Congress ==
Period	Representative
20th Congress; 2025–present	Caroline Tanchay
Note: A party-list group, can win a maximum of three seats in the House of Representatives.
