= Caroline Tanchay =

Filipino businesswoman and politician

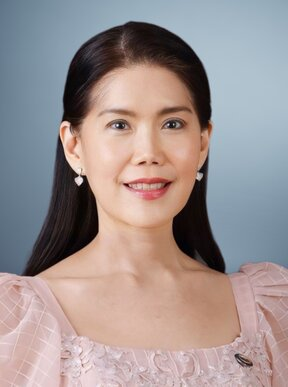
- Official portrait, 2025

Member of the Philippine House of Representatives for Kamalayan Partylist
- Incumbent
- Assumed office June 30, 2025
- Preceded by: Position established

Member of the Philippine House of Representatives for SAGIP Partylist
- In office June 30, 2022 – September 25, 2024 Serving with Rodante Marcoleta

Personal details
- Born: Caroline Lim Tanchay
- Education: De La Salle University
- Occupation: Businesswoman

Caroline Lim Tanchay is a Filipino businesswoman and politician who is serving as a member of the House of Representatives of the Philippines for the Kamalayan Partylist since June 30, 2025.

She has also served as a representative for the SAGIP Partylist alongside Rodante Marcoleta in the House of Representatives from 2022 to 2024.

Tanchay is the Chairman, President, and Chief Executive Officer of Oriental Peninsula Resources Group, Inc., a publicly listed mining company on the Philippine Stock Exchange. Her business interests span mining, renewable energy, real estate development, and food and hospitality.

== Education ==
Tanchay graduated from De La Salle University in 1988 with a Bachelor of Science in Commerce, major in Business Management (BSC-BM).

== Business career ==
=== Mining ===
Tanchay is the president and CEO of nickel mining firm Oriental Peninsula Resources (ORÉ) Through its subsidiary Citinickel Mines and Development Corp., ORÉ runs Pulot Mine and the Toronto Mine in Sofronio Española and Narra in Palawan. In 2015, ORE was included in Forbes' Best Under A Billion (BUB) list.

She credits the ORÉ for being able to provide 2,000 jobs in the Palawan site and bringing development to the locale.

=== Real estate ===
The Oriental Peninsula Resources Group also engages in real estate. The Oré Central, a commercial development associated with the Tanchays, received the Best Green Development award at the Philippine Property Awards.

=== Retail ===
Tanchay also bought the franchise for Dean & DeLuca introducing the American grocery chain to the Philippine market.

== Political career ==
=== SAGIP Party-list (2022–2024) ===
Tanchay became a member of the House of Representatives for the SAGIP Partylist after campaigning as the first nominee of the 2022 elections. The organization campaigned to mitigate the power consumption expenses of Filipinos.

Tanchay along with her colleague and SAGIP co-representative Rodante Marcoleta filed at least ten proposed legislation related to power. They also urged for more restrictions to combat conflict of interest in the power industry.

Tanchay reportedly resigned in September 25, 2024 and ran as the first nominee for Kamalayan Partylist. However according to Bilyonaryo, Tanchay was still listed as a signatory to the first impeachment complaint filed against Vice President Sara Duterte by the lower house.

=== Kamalayan Party-List (2025–present) ===
Tanchay was elected to the House of Representatives in the May 2025 election as the first nominee of the Kamalayan Partylist.

She assumed office on June 30, 2025, as a member of the 20th Congress.

Her areas of legislative interest include renewable energy development, electricity affordability, agriculture, livelihood development, rural infrastructure, and healthcare access.

=== Agricultural and coffee development initiatives ===
Tanchay has advocated for increased agricultural productivity and the development of the Philippine coffee industry, particularly in Mindanao.

Her coffee development initiatives focus on expanding domestic production, improving planting materials, increasing farm productivity, and supporting infrastructure that connects coffee-producing communities to agricultural markets.

The initiatives have placed particular emphasis on Sultan Kudarat and other coffee-producing provinces in Mindanao.

== Electoral history ==
Electoral history of Caroline Tanchay
| Year | Office | Party | Votes received | | | | Result |
| Year | Office | Party | Total | % | P. | Swing | Result |
|---|---|---|---|---|---|---|---|
| 2022 | Representative (Party-list) | SAGIP | 780,456 | 2.12% | 6th | —N/a | Won |
| 2025 | Representative (Party-list) | Kamalayan | 381,437 | 0.91% | 32nd | —N/a | Won |
