= Murang Kuryente Partylist =

Political party in the Philippines

- — Philippine partylist —
- Full name: Murang Kuryente Partylist
- Abbreviation: MKP
- Sector(s) represented: Electricity consumers

Current representation (20th Congress)
- Seats in the House of Representatives: 1 / 3 (Out of 64 party-list seats)
- Representative(s): Arthur C. Yap

The Murang Kuryente Partylist (MKP; lit. 'Cheap Electricity Partylist') is a consumer organization with party-list representation in the House of Representatives of the Philippines. It professes to represent the interest of electricity consumers.

== Electoral history ==
The Murang Kuryente Partylist took part in the 2019 election. It failed to win a single seat. It also participated at the 2025 election, initially failing to win a seat again.

On October 2, 2025, Arthur C. Yap took the oath as MKP representative. This was to fill one of the three seats originally won by disqualified group Duterte Youth.

== Political stances ==
The MKP positions itself as a partylist organization for electricity consumers. It claims to represent this demographic rather than power companies. It has pledged to bring affordable electricity fees to consumers and the wider adoption of renewable energy.

The MKP has challenged Meralco to phase-out coal power. It opposed the bid of Philippine Rural Electric Cooperatives Association to make the Energy Regulatory Commission formulate a plan which would pass on real property taxes to electric consumers.

== Electoral results ==
Election	Votes	%	Secured Seats	Party-List Seats	Congress	Representative
2019	127,530	0.46%	0 / 3	61	18th Congress; 2019–2022	—N/a
2025	247,754	0.63%	1 / 3	64	20th Congress; 2025–2028	Arthur C. Yap
Note: A party-list group, can win a maximum of three seats in the House of Representatives.
