= Pinoy Workers Partylist =

Filipino political party-list

Pinoy Workers
- — Philippine partylist —
- Full name: People Working for the Development of the Philippines
- Colors: Blue; Red

Current representation (20th Congress)
- Seats in the House of Representatives: 1 / 3 (Out of 63 party-list seats)
- Representative(s): Karl Legazpi

The People Working for the Development of the Philippines, commonly known as the Pinoy Workers Partylist, is a political organization seeking party-list representation in the House of Representatives of the Philippines.

== Background ==
Pinoy Workers aims to focus on the rights and welfare of Filipino workers.

== History ==
=== 20th Congress ===
The party-list ran in the 2025 Philippine midterm elections, placing twenty-second in the polls with 475,985 votes. Pinoy Workers gained its first ever congressional seat in the 20th Congress, represented by first nominee Franz Vincent Legazpi. He resigned from the House of Representatives for unspecified reasons on May 18, 2026, and was replaced by Karl Josef Legazpi on 20 May.

== Electoral performance ==
| Election | Votes | % | Seats |
|---|---|---|---|
| 2025 | 475,985 | 1.13 | 1 / 63 |

== Representatives to Congress ==
| Period | Representative |
|---|---|
| 20th Congress; 2025–2028 | Franz Vincent Legazpi (resigned on May 18, 2026) |
| 20th Congress; 2025–2028 | Karl Josef Legazpi (from May 20, 2026) |
Note: A party-list group, can win a maximum of three seats in the House of Representatives.
