= Manuel Frederick Ko =

Filipino politician (born 1966)

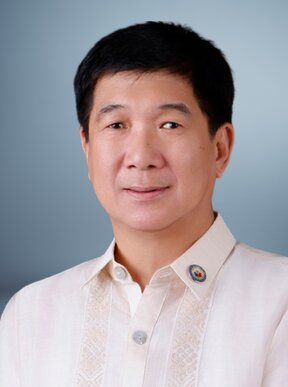
- Official portrait, 2025

Member of Philippine House of Representatives for Abang Lingkod
- Incumbent
- Assumed office June 30, 2025
- Preceded by: Stephen Paduano

Vice Governor of Negros Occidental
- Acting
- In office November 5, 2022 – November 11, 2022

Member of the Negros Occidental Provincial Board
- In office June 30, 2016 – June 30, 2025
- In office June 30, 2004 – June 30, 2013

Personal details
- Born: Manuel Frederick Ong Ko; August 10, 1966 (age 60) Manapla, Negros Occidental, Philippines
- Party: Abang Lingkod (party-list; 2025–present)
- Other political affiliations: NPC (2004–2025)
- Nickname: Manman

Manuel Frederick "Manman" Ong Ko (born August 10, 1966) is a Filipino politician serving as the representative for the Abang Lingkod party-list in the Philippine House of Representatives since 2025. He previously served as a member of the Negros Occidental Provincial Board from 2004 to 2013 and again from 2016 to 2025.

== Political career ==
=== Negros Occidental Provincial Board (2016–2025) ===
Ko was first elected to the Negros Occidental Provincial Board in 2004 to represent the province's 3rd district under the Nationalist People's Coalition. He served two more terms until 2013, and made successful re-election bids in 2016, 2019 and 2022.

In November 2022, Ko briefly served as acting vice governor of Negros Occidental after Vice Governor Jeffrey Ferrer was designated acting governor during Governor Bong Lacson's official trip to Australia to lead a provincial delegation.

=== House of Representatives (2025–present) ===
==== 2025 election ====
Ko was the first nominee of Abang Lingkod, a party-list organization representing farmers and fisherfolk, for the 2025 House elections, after incumbent representative Stephen Paduano was term-limited. The party placed 50th and secured one seat in the 20th Congress.

==== Tenure ====
During the 20th Congress, Ko principally authored bills seeking to create government agencies related to the agricultural sector, including a Bureau of Agricultural Cooperative Development under the Department of Agriculture, the National Coffee and Cocoa Research Center, and a National Agro-Food Facility. He also filed measures increasing the basic salary of government medical doctors to Salary Grade 23 and strengthening the National Integrated Cancer Control Program.

Ko voted in favor of the second impeachment of Vice President Sara Duterte on May 11, 2026.

==== Committee membership ====
- Committee on Aquaculture and Fisheries Resources (Vice Chair)
- Committee on Public Accounts (Vice Chair)
- Committee on Agriculture and Food
- Committee on Energy
- Committee on Natural Resources

== Electoral history ==
Electoral history of Manuel Frederick Ko
Year	Office	Party	Votes received				Result
Year	Office	Party	Total	%	P.	Swing	Result
2004	Negros Occidental Provincial Board Member	NPC	—N/a	—N/a	2nd	—N/a	Won
2007	Negros Occidental Provincial Board Member	NPC	—N/a	—N/a	1st	—N/a	Won
2010	Negros Occidental Provincial Board Member	NPC	99,753	48.01%	2nd	—N/a	Won
2016	Negros Occidental Provincial Board Member	NPC	110,865	—N/a	1st	—N/a	Won
2019	Negros Occidental Provincial Board Member	NPC	130,417	—N/a	1st	—N/a	Won
2022	Negros Occidental Provincial Board Member	NPC	140,400	—N/a	1st	—N/a	Won
2025	Representative (Party-list)	Abang Lingkod	274,735	0.69%	50th	—N/a	Won

House of Representatives of the Philippines
Preceded by Stephen Paduano	Member for Abang Lingkod; June 30, 2025 – present	Incumbent
