= 1Tahanan =

Political party in the Philippines

- — Philippine partylist —
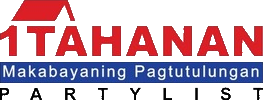
- Founded: 2015
- Colors: Red, Blue

Current representation (20th Congress)
- Seats in the House of Representatives: 1 / 3 (Out of 63 Partylist seats)
- Representative(s): Elmer Catulpos

1Tahanan (from lit. 'one home') is a political organization with party-list representation in the House of Representatives of the Philippines.

== History ==
1Tahanan was established in 2015 as a group which provide funeral and hospitalization assistance to people in Cebu. The group shifted its focus on providing low-cost housing starting 2019.

By 2025, 1Tahanan is based in Mindanao and backed by businessman Elmer Catulpos who is the CEO of the Brigada Group. It took part at the 2025 election as a party-list organization and won a seat. They ran on a platform to provide public housing for Filipinos and pass legislation for mothers and single parents. Their campaign received an endorsement from senator Bong Go. Nathan Oducado, a lawyer, filled the seat. He resigned from the House of Representatives citing health reasons on May 18, 2026, and was replaced by Elmer Catulpos on May 28.

== Electoral history ==
Election	Votes	%	Seats
2025	309,761	0.74	1 / 63

== Representatives to Congress ==
Period	Representative
20th Congress; 2025–2028	Nat Oducado (resigned on May 18, 2026)
20th Congress; 2025–2028	Elmer Catulpos (from May 28, 2026)
Note: A party-list group, can win a maximum of three seats in the House of Representatives.
