= 4K Partylist =

Political party in the Philippines

4K
- — Philippine partylist —
- Full name: Kababaihan Kabalikatan para sa Kapakanan at Kaunlaran ng Bayan
- Abbreviation: 4K
- Type: Sectoral organization
- Sector(s) represented: Women
- Colors: Orange

Current representation (20th Congress)
- Seats in the House of Representatives: 1 / 3 (Out of 63 Partylist seats)
- Representative(s): Iris Marie Montes

The Kababaihan Kabalikatan para sa Kapakanan at Kaunlaran ng Bayan (lit. 'Women partners for the state and advancement of the nation'), also known as the 4K Partylist, is a political organization with party-list representation in the House of Representatives of the Philippines which focuses on women's issues.

== History ==
The Kababaihan Kabalikatan para sa Kapakanan at Kaunlaran ng Bayan (4K Partylist) took part at the 2025 election and successfully vied for a seat as a party-list organization. 4K's advocacy and platforms are centered on women's issues.

The seat was filled by Iris Marie Montes, a political science graduate from the University of the Philippines. She has no prior experience as a legislator in the Congress.

== Political positions ==
4K presents itself as a partylist which focuses on women's issues. Its platform is named in its "HEELS" agenda which stands for health, education, environment, livelihood, and services.

== Electoral history ==
Election	Votes	%	Seats
2025	521,592	1.24	1 / 63

== Representatives to Congress ==
Period	Representative
20th Congress; 2025–present	Iris Marie Montes
Note: A party-list group, can win a maximum of three seats in the House of Representatives.
