= Abang Lingkod =

Political party in the Philippines

- — Philippine partylist —
- Sector(s) represented: Farmers and fisherfolk
- COMELEC accreditation: December 22, 2009; 16 years ago
- Ideology: Agrarianism
- Colors: Green

Current representation (20th Congress)
- Seats in the House of Representatives: 1 / 3 (Out of 63 party-list seats)
- Representative(s): Manuel Frederick Ko

Abang Lingkod (lit. 'Humble Servant') is a political organization with representation in the House of Representatives of the Philippines. It aims to represent the interest of Filipino farmers and fishermen.

== History ==
Abang Lingkod registered on December 22, 2009, to participate in the 2010 House of Representatives elections under the party-list system but failed to obtain a seat in the House of Representatives.

On May 31, 2012, Abang Lingkod manifested its intent to participate in the 2013 House of Representatives elections before the Commission on Elections (COMELEC). With questions surrounding its nominees, it was among the several party-lists that were sought to be disqualified by the poll watchdog group Kontra Daya and left-wing human rights group Karapatan claiming that "its nominees and leaders possess interest in conflict and adverse to the interests of peasants/farmers." In November 2012, COMELEC disqualified several party-lists including Abang Lingkod. However, the said party-list was able to secure a status quo ante order from the Supreme Court, thus allowing it to participate again in the 2013 elections.

With a ruling on April 5, 2013, that the party-list system was not only for marginalized sectors, the Supreme Court decided in favor of the 54 disqualified party-list groups, which included Abang Lingkod, and ordered COMELEC to conduct "evidentiary hearings" to determine their eligibility to participate in the 2013 election. On May 6, 2013, COMELEC once again ruled against Abang Lingkod.

As Abang Lingkod was already included in the official ballots despite its disqualification, it was able to garner more than 260,000 votes but was not proclaimed by COMELEC pending their appeal to the Supreme Court. The Supreme Court once again issued a status quo ante order on June 5, 2013, in response to COMELEC's resolution disqualifying Abang Lingkod. On October 22, 2013, the Supreme Court ruled that Abang Lingkod "need not prove track record" and on November 27, 2013, voting 10–4, ordered COMELEC to proclaim Abang Lingkod. COMELEC filed for a motion for reconsideration but it was denied and ruled with finality by the Supreme Court in February 2014.

With the legal hurdles resolved, its first nominee Joseph Stephen Paduano was finally sworn into office on May 28, 2014.

== Electoral performance ==
Election	Votes	%	Seats
2010	32,122	0.11%	0 / 57
2013	260,923	0.94%	1 / 59
2016	466,701	1.44%	1 / 59
2019	275,199	0.99%	1 / 61
2022	296,800	0.81%	1 / 63
2025	271,847	0.66%	1 / 63

== Representatives to Congress ==
Period	Representative
16th Congress; 2013–2016	Stephen Paduano
17th Congress; 2016–2019	Stephen Paduano
18th Congress; 2019–2022	Stephen Paduano
19th Congress; 2022–2025	Stephen Paduano
20th Congress; 2025–2028 (upcoming)	Manuel Frederick Ko
Note: A party-list group, can win a maximum of three seats in the House of Representatives.
