= Tingog Party List =

Sectoral party-list in the Philippines

Tingog
- — Philippine partylist —
- Full name: Tingog Sinirangan
- Chairperson: Mark Roa Gimenez
- President: Glenn Jaro Capucion
- Secretary general: Luningning Lariosa
- Type: Political party
- Founded: October 2, 2012; 13 years ago
- Headquarters: Tacloban
- Ideology: Regionalism
- Colors: Blue, Orange
- Slogan: Pagbag-o. Paglaum. Pag-uswag. (transl. Change, hope and progress.)

Current representation (20th Congress)
- Seats in the House of Representatives: 3 / 3 (Out of 63 party-list seats)
- Representative(s): Andrew Julian Romualdez; Jude Acidre; Yedda Romualdez

Tingog Sinirangan (lit. 'Voice of the East'), also known as the Tingog Party List, is a political organization with party-list representation in the House of Representatives of the Philippines.

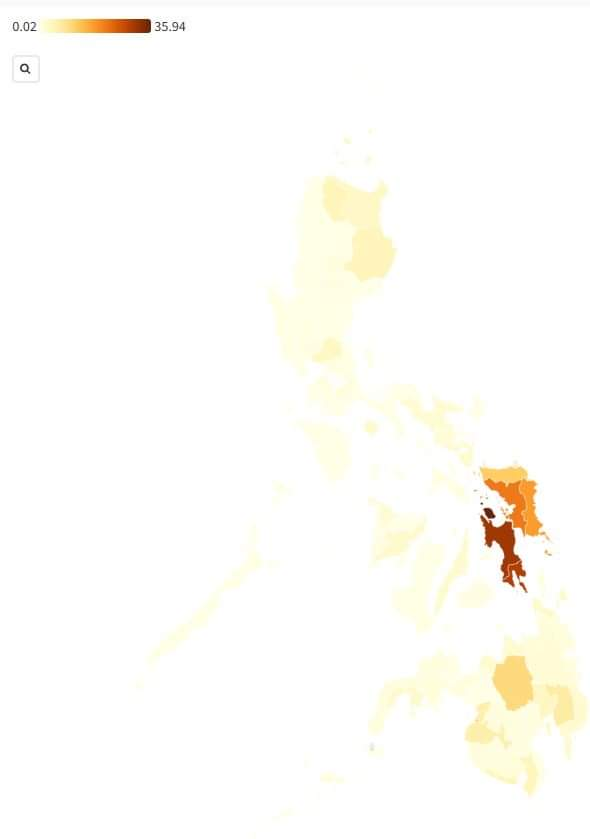
Tingog Party-list Percentage based on the 2022 Philippine general elections

== Background ==
Tingog was established on October 2, 2012, as Tingog Leytehon, a provincial political party based in Leyte province. The first chairman of Tingog was Leyte Governor Edgardo Enerlan and Leyte congressman Martin Romualdez. It was accredited on August 19, 2015, by the Commission on Elections as a party-list organization making it eligible to seek party-list representation in the House of Representatives as early as the 2016 elections.

The Tingog Party List aims to represent the interest of Eastern Visayans, although it bills itself as an organization that provides a "regional perspective on national issues". It focuses on issues affecting the countryside or rural areas in general. "Tingog" came from the Waray word for "voice".

Tingog fielded Yedda Marie Romualdez, Jude Acidre, Jaime Go, Alexis V. Yu, and Jennifer Padual as its nominees for the 2019 elections. The organization only secured one seat, which was filled by Yedda Marie Romualdez. She is not a newcomer, having been Leyte's 1st district representative of the then just-concluded 17th Congress. During the 18th Congress, the Alternative Learning System Act was passed into law. The corresponding bill in the House of Representative, had Romualdez as one of its principal authors and the measure was considered a priority by Tingog.

Tingog took part in the 2022 elections with Romualdez, Acidre, and Karla Estrada, Go, and Yu as its nominees. Tingog gathered 886,959 votes, third from ACT-CIS and 1-Rider Partylist during 2022 elections. Tingog is projected to gain an additional seat.

Tingog withdrew from the MoU between the DBP and PhilHealth's Rural Hospital Financing Program amid criticism from health activists, finance and civil society groups.

Tingog took part of the 2025 elections, with Andrew Julian Romualdez replacing his mom Yedda as the first nominee. They achieved 1,822,708 votes, winning 3 seats and placing third from Akbayan and Duterte Youth.

In February 2025, election watchdog Kontra Daya tagged Tingog Sinirangan as among the party-list groups with ties to political dynasties in the Philippines, with its nominees being the wife and son of then House Speaker Martin Romualdez. Kontra Daya said that more than half of party-list organizations vying for slots in the House of Representatives do not represent marginalized groups, having links to big business, political dynasties, or corruption cases. The group said Tingog Sinirangan's candidacy deserves scrutiny, especially since House Speaker Martin Romualdez is a cousin of President Bongbong Marcos.

In July 2025, Tingog party-list Representative Jude Acidre said that he opposed the anti-dynasty bill filed in Congress by ACT Teachers Party-list Representative Antonio Tinio and Kabataan Party-list Representative Renee Co.

== Electoral results ==
Election	Votes	%	Secured Seats	Party-List Seats	Congress	1st Representative	2nd Representative	3rd Representative
2016	210,552	0.65%	0 / 3	59	17th Congress; 2016–2019	—N/a	—N/a	—N/a
2019	391,211	1.40%	1 / 3	61	18th Congress; 2019–2022	Yedda Romualdez	—N/a	—N/a
2022	886,959	2.41%	2 / 3	63	19th Congress; 2022–2025	Yedda Romualdez	Jude Acidre	—N/a
2025	1,822,708	4.34%	3 / 3	63	20th Congress; 2025–2028	Andrew Julian Romualdez	Jude Acidre	Yedda Romualdez (Note: Seated on July 18, 2025, after the resignation of its nominees Marie Josephine Calatrava, Alexis Yu and Paul Richard Muncada were recognised by the Commission on Elections.)
Note: A party-list group, can win a maximum of three seats in the House of Representatives.
