= Trabaho Partylist =

Filipino political party-list

Trabaho
- — Philippine partylist —
- Full name: Tagapagtaguyod ng mga Reporma at Adhikaing Babalikat at Hahango sa mga Oportunidad para sa mga Pilipino
- Abbreviation: TRABAHO
- President: Juan Paulo Amador
- Sector(s) represented: Workers
- Colors: Blue; Red

Current representation (20th Congress)
- Seats in the House of Representatives: 1 / 3 (Out of 63 party-list seats)
- Representative(s): Johanne Monich Bautista

Tagapagtaguyod ng mga Reporma at Adhikaing Babalikat at Hahango sa mga Oportunidad para sa mga Pilipino, better known as the Trabaho Partylist (stylized as TRABAHO), is a political organization with party-list representation in the House of Representatives of the Philippines. It intends to represent the interest of workers.

== Background ==
Prior to the 2025 Philippine general election, TRABAHO vowed to enact legislation should it successfully secure representation in the House of Representatives, with a platform focused on "sustainable employment opportunities, equitable wages, and enhanced worker benefits and protections". They have also pledged to address challenges faced by the workforce that affect their health, as well as workplace protections in response to climate change and evolving labor conditions.

== History ==
=== 20th Congress ===
The party-list sought a seat in the House of Representatives in the 2025 midterm elections. TRABAHO received 709,283 votes, equivalent to 1.69% of the total vote. The party secured one seat, held by its first nominee, Johanne Monich Bautista.

== Electoral performance ==
Election	Votes	%	Seats
2022	138,973	0.38	0 / 63
2025	709,283	1.69	1 / 63

== Representatives to Congress ==
Period	Representative
20th Congress; 2025–present	Johanne Monich Bautista
Note: A party-list group, can win a maximum of three seats in the House of Representatives.
