= Alfred delos Santos =

Filipino politician (born 1991)

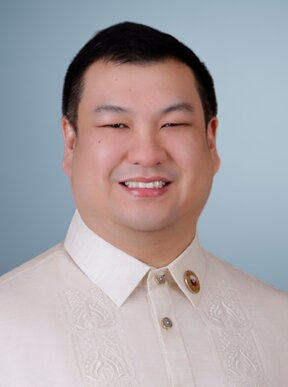

Member of the House of Representatives for Ang Probinsyano Party-list
- Incumbent
- Assumed office October 2, 2025
- In office July 30, 2019 – June 30, 2025 Serving with Ronnie Ong (formerly)
- Preceded by: Title established

Personal details
- Born: Alfred Co delos Santos; December 18, 1991 (age 33) Legazpi, Albay
- Political party: Ang Probinsyano

Alfred Co delos Santos is a politician and Member of the House of Representatives for the Ang Probinsyano Party-list, starting from 2019.

== Early life ==
Alfred delos Santos was born on December 18, 1991, in Legazpi, Albay. He spent his primary and secondary years in Divine World College from 1999 to 2005. He joined the Aquinas University Science Oriented High School from 2005 to 2009. He majored in Business Administration from the Financial Management class in University of Santo Tomas–Legazpi from 2009 to 2013.

== Career ==
=== Congress (2019–2025; 2025–present) ===
In the 2019 Philippine party-list elections, Ang Probinsyano gained 767,840 votes, 2.78% of the votes. This gained them two seats, with delos Santos taking the seat along with Ronnie Ong.

In the 2022 Philippine party-list elections, Ang Probinsyano party list gained one seat with 709,064 votes with 1.96% of the votes. Since delos Santos was the first nominee, he won the seat. He served as an assistant majority leader for the committee on rules and acted as a member for the committees of accounts, appropriations, local government, public accounts, and creative industry and performing arts. He authored 264 bills and co-authored 141 bills.

Delos Santos supports the curb of measures against dengue. He stated that he wanted to increase the funding for research of dengue vaccines.
