= Malasakit at Bayanihan =

Filipino political party-list

- — Philippine partylist —
- Full name: Malasakit at Bayanihan Foundation
- Chairperson: Girlie Veloso
- Headquarters: Davao City
- Colors: Red; Blue

Current representation (20th Congress)
- Seats in the House of Representatives: 1 / 3 (Out of 63 party-list seats)
- Representative(s): Girlie Veloso

Website
- malasakitatbayanihan.com

The Malasakit at Bayanihan Foundation, stylized and abbreviated as Malasakit@Bayanihan (transl. Compassion and communal work) is a party-list which participated in the 2022 and 2025 Philippine party-list elections.

== Elections ==
In the 2022 Philippine House of Representatives party-list election, Malasakit at Bayanihan had five nominees for congress. In the elections, they gained 336,846 votes, with 0.93 percent of the votes, gaining 31st place. In the 2025 Philippine House of Representatives party-list election, the party-list gained ten nominees. In a survey from Arkipelago Analytics originating from April 26 to May 1, 2025, Malasakit at Bayanihan was predicted to gain two seats. In the elections, the party-list gained 575,341 votes, 1.38 percent of the votes, gaining 12th place. The party-list gained one seat, filled by Girlie Veloso.

== Electoral performance ==
Election	Votes	%	Seats
2022	336,846	0.93	1 / 63
2025	575,341	1.38	1 / 63

== Representatives to Congress ==
Period	Representative
19th Congress; 2022–2025	Anthony Golez
20th Congress; 2025–2028 (upcoming)	Girlie Veloso
Note: A party-list group, can win a maximum of three seats in the House of Representatives.
