= Nanay Partylist =

Political organization

Nanay
- — Philippine partylist —
- Type: Sectoral organization
- Sector(s) represented: Mothers, Vendors, Poorest of the poor,
- Founded: 2023; 3 years ago

Current representation (20th Congress)
- Seats in the House of Representatives: 1 / 3 (Out of 63 Partylist seats)
- Representative(s): Florabel Yatco

Nanay Partylist (lit. 'Mothers Partylist') is a political organization seeking party-list representation in the House of Representatives of the Philippines. The party officially filed its certificate of nomination on October 8, 2024, for the 2025 elections, with 10 candidates, and supported mothers and vendors. After gaining 293,430 votes (0.7%) and 47th place, they secured one seat, filled by restaurant owner Florabel Yatco.

== History ==
They took part in the 2025 Philippine House of Representatives elections with 10 nominees, including Party President and restaurant owner Florabel Yatco and Pampanga Board Member Ananias Canlas Jr. The nomination certification for the party-list was filed on October 8, 2024, with Yatco attending the filing of papers at the Tent City of the Manila Hotel.

During a visit at the San Fernando Public Market in Pampanga, Yatco talked with women vendors and distributed work materials, pledging to support the rights of market vendors if elected. The party-list, according to the Center for Women's Resources, upheld the support of livelihoods through programs and seminars. According to Ian Ocampo Flora of SunStar, the party-list also endorses the idea of family as the base of society, the solving of maternal health problems, job opportunities for mothers, and better services. From January to September 2024, the party-list, according to the Philippine Center for Investigative Journalism, spent a total of PHP 5,930,000 on outdoor advertising. The party-list also topped several polls, such as a February 2025 OCTA Research survey with 9th place (2.47%) and an April 2025 Pulse Asia poll with 8th place (2.28%). In the official results, the party-list gained 293,430 votes (0.7%), resulting in 47th place out of 156 total party-lists in the election. As the party-list placed within the top 53, they secured one seat. This was filled by Yatco who was joined by Canlas during the proclamation.

== Electoral performance ==
Election	Votes	%	Seats
2025	293,430	0.70	1 / 63

== Representatives to Congress ==
Period	Representative
20th Congress; 2025–2028	Florabel Yatco
Note: A party-list group, can win a maximum of three seats in the House of Representatives.
