= Floor leaders of the House of Representatives of the Philippines =

Floor leaders of the House of Representatives of the Philippines

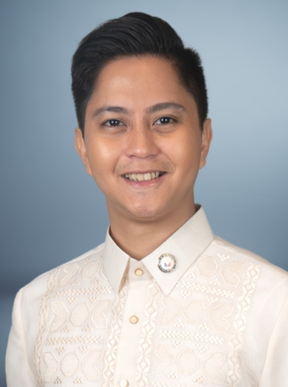
Majority Leader
Sandro Marcos (Lakas)
(since July 28, 2025)

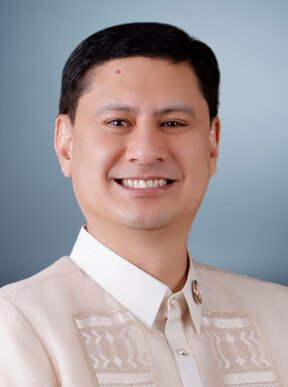
Senior Deputy Majority Leader
Lorenz Defensor (NUP)
(since July 29, 2025)

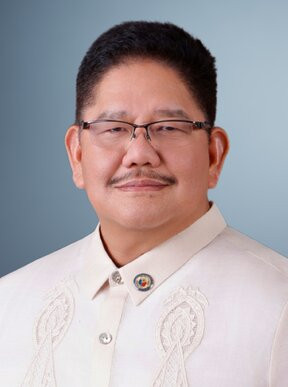
Minority Leader
Marcelino Libanan (4Ps)
(since July 25, 2022)

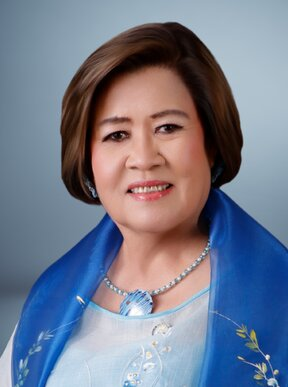
Senior Deputy Minority Leader
Leila de Lima (ML)
(since March 3, 2026)

The floor leaders of the House of Representatives of the Philippines are the two lawmakers elected by their respective parties or coalitions as their official leaders, serving as the chief spokespersons of their party in matters concerning legislative business in the House. The majority and minority leaders are each elected through a party caucus among their respective members. A senior deputy leader, multiple deputy leaders, and assistant leaders are also selected from among the members of the majority and minority blocs.

== History ==
The positions of majority and minority leaders in the House are similar to the party leadership roles in the United States House of Representatives. In recent years, the two leadership posts have more closely resembled their American counterparts than those in the Philippine Senate, which selects its floor leaders from alliances formed among its members.

The current distinction between majority and minority leaders briefly existed during the 1st Philippine Legislature; however, in succeeding legislative terms until around the inauguration of the Third Republic in 1946, there was only a single representative referred to as the floor leader. The distinction has existed continuously since the 1st Philippine Congress.

== Majority floor leader ==
The majority floor leader is elected among the members of the majority bloc, or those who voted for the House speaker. The majority floor leader acts as the spokesman of the majority bloc and directs deliberation on the plenary. The chairmanship of the Committee on Rules is traditionally held concurrently by the majority leader.

== Minority floor leader ==
The minority floor leader is elected among the members of the minority bloc. Traditionally, the losing candidate in a two-way speakership election becomes the minority leader, but this was changed in the 17th Congress. The minority floor leader is the spokesman of the minority bloc, and is an ex officio member of all committees.

== List of floor leaders ==
=== Philippine Assembly (1907–1916) ===
Legislature	Term	Majority leader	Party	Speaker	Party	Minority leader	Party
1st Legislature	October 16, 1907 – 1909	Manuel L. Quezon	Nacionalista	Sergio Osmeña	Nacionalista	Vicente Singson Encarnación	Progresista
2nd Legislature	1910–1912	Alberto Barretto	Nacionalista	Sergio Osmeña	Nacionalista	None	
3rd Legislature	1912–1914	Macario Adriatico	Nacionalista	Sergio Osmeña	Nacionalista	None	
3rd Legislature	1914–1916	Galicano Apacible	Nacionalista	Sergio Osmeña	Nacionalista	None	

=== House of Representatives (1916–1935) ===
Legislature	Term	Majority leader	Party	Speaker	Party	Minority leader
4th Legislature	October 16, 1916 – June 3, 1919	Rafael Alunan Sr.	Nacionalista	Sergio Osmeña	Nacionalista	None
5th Legislature	July 21, 1919 – June 6, 1922	Rafael Alunan Sr.	Nacionalista	Sergio Osmeña	Nacionalista	None
6th Legislature	October 27, 1922 – June 2, 1925	Benigno Aquino Sr.	Nacionalista; Unipersonalista	Manuel Roxas	Nacionalista; Colectivista	None
7th Legislature	July 16, 1925 – June 5, 1928	Benigno Aquino Sr.	Nacionalista; Consolidado	Manuel Roxas	Nacionalista; Consolidado	None
8th Legislature	July 16, 1928 – June 2, 1931	Manuel Briones	Nacionalista; Consolidado	Manuel Roxas	Nacionalista; Consolidado	None
9th Legislature	July 16, 1931 – 1933	Manuel Briones	Nacionalista; Consolidado	Manuel Roxas	Nacionalista; Consolidado	None
9th Legislature	1933	Pedro Sabido	Nacionalista; Consolidado	Manuel Roxas	Nacionalista; Consolidado	None
9th Legislature	1934 – June 5, 1934	Francisco Varona	Nacionalista; Consolidado	Manuel Roxas	Nacionalista; Consolidado	None
10th Legislature	July 16, 1934 – November 15, 1935	José E. Romero	Nacionalista; Democratico	Quintín Paredes	Nacionalista; Democratico	None

=== National Assembly (1935–1945) ===
Legislature	Term	Majority leader	Party	Speaker	Party	Minority leader
1st National Assembly	November 25, 1935 – December 30, 1938	José E. Romero	Nacionalista; Democratico	Gil Montilla	Nacionalista; Democratico	None (Note: Only one party held all the seats in the chamber.)
2nd National Assembly	January 24, 1939 – December 30, 1941	Quintín Paredes	Nacionalista	José Yulo	Nacionalista	None
National Assembly (Second Republic)	October 18, 1943 – August 17, 1945	Francisco Zulueta	KALIBAPI	Benigno Aquino Sr.	KALIBAPI	None

=== House of Representatives (1945–1973) ===
Legislature	Term	Majority leader	Party	Speaker	Party	Minority leader	Party
1st Commonwealth; Congress	June 9, 1945 – May 25, 1946	Eugenio Pérez	Nacionalista	José Zulueta	Nacionalista	None	
2nd Commonwealth; Congress	May 25 – August 5, 1946	Raul Leuterio	Liberal	Eugenio Pérez	Liberal	Cipriano Primicias Sr.	Nacionalista
1st Congress	August 5, 1946 – December 30, 1949	Raul Leuterio	Liberal	Eugenio Pérez	Liberal	Cipriano Primicias Sr.	Nacionalista
2nd Congress	December 30, 1949 – December 30, 1953	Raul Leuterio	Liberal	Eugenio Pérez	Liberal	Jose Laurel Jr.	Nacionalista
3rd Congress	January 25, 1954 – August 4, 1957	Arturo Tolentino	Nacionalista	Jose Laurel Jr.	Nacionalista	Eugenio Pérez	Liberal
3rd Congress	August 4 – December 30, 1957	Arturo Tolentino	Nacionalista	Jose Laurel Jr.	Nacionalista	Vacant (Note: Eugenio Pérez died on August 4, 1957.)	
4th Congress	January 27, 1958 – December 30, 1959	Jose Aldeguer	Nacionalista	Daniel Romualdez	Nacionalista	Ferdinand Marcos	Liberal
4th Congress	December 30, 1959 – January 25, 1960	Jose Aldeguer	Nacionalista	Daniel Romualdez	Nacionalista	Vacant (Note: Ferdinand Marcos took office as a senator on December 30, 1959.)	
4th Congress	January 25, 1960 – December 30, 1961	Jose Aldeguer	Nacionalista	Daniel Romualdez	Nacionalista	Cornelio Villareal	Liberal
5th Congress	January 22 – March 8, 1962	Justiniano Montano	Nacionalista	Daniel Romualdez	Nacionalista	Cornelio Villareal	Liberal
5th Congress	March 8, 1962 – March 22, 1965	Justiniano Montano	Nacionalista	Cornelio Villareal	Liberal	Daniel Romualdez	Nacionalista
6th Congress	January 17, 1966 – February 2, 1967	Justiniano Montano	Nacionalista	Cornelio Villareal	Liberal	Jose Laurel Jr.	Nacionalista
6th Congress	February 2, 1967 – December 30, 1969	Marcelino Veloso	Nacionalista	Jose Laurel Jr.	Nacionalista	Cornelio Villareal	Liberal
7th Congress	January 26, 1970 – April 1, 1971	Marcelino Veloso	Nacionalista	Jose Laurel Jr.	Nacionalista	Justiniano Montano	Liberal
7th Congress	April 1 – June 12, 1971	Marcelino Veloso	Nacionalista	Cornelio Villareal	Liberal	Justiniano Montano	Liberal
7th Congress	June 12 – December 30, 1971	Marcelino Veloso	Nacionalista	Cornelio Villareal	Liberal	Ramon Mitra Jr.	Liberal
7th Congress	January 24, 1972 – January 17, 1973	Marcelino Veloso	Nacionalista	Cornelio Villareal	Liberal	Ramon Felipe Jr.	Liberal

=== Batasang Pambansa (1978–1986) ===
Legislature	Term	Majority leader	Party	Speaker	Party	Minority leader	Party
Interim; Batasang Pambansa	June 12, 1978 – June 30, 1984	Jose Roño	KBL	Querube Makalintal	KBL	Hilario Davide Jr.	Pusyon Bisaya
Regular; Batasang Pambansa	July 23, 1984 – March 25, 1986	Jose Roño	KBL	Nicanor Yñiguez	KBL	Jose Laurel Jr.	UNIDO

=== House of Representatives (1987–present) ===
Legislature	Term	Majority leader	Party	Speaker	Party	Minority leader	Party
8th Congress	July 27, 1987 – October 20, 1989	Francisco Sumulong	PDP–Laban	Ramon Mitra Jr.	LnB	Rodolfo Albano Jr.	KBL
8th Congress	July 27, 1987 – October 20, 1989	Francisco Sumulong	LDP	Ramon Mitra Jr.	LDP	Rodolfo Albano Jr.	KBL
8th Congress	October 20, 1989 – June 1, 1990	Francisco Sumulong	LDP	Ramon Mitra Jr.	LDP	Mohammad Ali Dimaporo	KBL
8th Congress	June 1, 1990 – July 22, 1991	Francisco Sumulong	LDP	Ramon Mitra Jr.	LDP	Salvador Escudero	KBL
8th Congress	July 22, 1991 – June 30, 1992	Francisco Sumulong	LDP	Ramon Mitra Jr.	LDP	Victor Ortega	Nacionalista
9th Congress	July 27, 1992 – June 30, 1995	Ronaldo Zamora	Lakas	Jose de Venecia Jr.	Lakas	Hernando Perez	LDP
10th Congress	July 24, 1995 – June 30, 1998	Rodolfo Albano Jr.	NPC	Jose de Venecia Jr.	Lakas	Ronaldo Zamora	NPC
11th Congress	July 27, 1998 – January 2, 2000	Mar Roxas	Liberal	Manny Villar	LAMMP	Feliciano Belmonte Jr.	Lakas
11th Congress	January 2 – November 13, 2000	Eduardo Gullas	LAMMP	Manny Villar	LAMMP	Feliciano Belmonte Jr.	Lakas
11th Congress	January 2 – November 13, 2000	Eduardo Gullas	LAMMP	Manny Villar	Independent	Feliciano Belmonte Jr.	Lakas
11th Congress	November 13, 2000 – January 24, 2001	Bella Angara	LDP	Arnulfo Fuentebella	NPC	Feliciano Belmonte Jr.	Lakas
11th Congress	January 24 – June 30, 2001	Sergio Apostol	Lakas	Feliciano Belmonte Jr.	Lakas	Butz Aquino	LDP
12th Congress	July 23, 2001 – June 30, 2004	Neptali Gonzales II	Lakas	Jose de Venecia Jr.	Lakas	Carlos Padilla	LDP
13th Congress	July 26, 2004 – June 30, 2007	Prospero Nograles	Lakas	Jose de Venecia Jr.	Lakas	Francis Escudero	NPC
14th Congress	July 23, 2007 – February 5, 2008	Arthur Defensor Sr.	Lakas	Jose de Venecia Jr.	Lakas	Ronaldo Zamora	Nacionalista
14th Congress	February 5, 2008 – June 30, 2010	Arthur Defensor Sr.	Lakas	Prospero Nograles	Lakas	Ronaldo Zamora	Nacionalista
15th Congress	July 26, 2010 – January 20, 2012	Neptali Gonzales II	Liberal	Feliciano Belmonte Jr.	Liberal	Edcel Lagman	Lakas
15th Congress	January 20, 2012 – June 30, 2013	Neptali Gonzales II	Liberal	Feliciano Belmonte Jr.	Liberal	Danilo Suarez	Lakas
16th Congress	July 22, 2013 – June 30, 2016	Neptali Gonzales II	Liberal	Feliciano Belmonte Jr.	Liberal	Ronaldo Zamora	Nacionalista
17th Congress	July 25, 2016 – July 23, 2018	Rodolfo Fariñas	PDP–Laban	Pantaleon Alvarez	PDP–Laban	Danilo Suarez	Lakas
17th Congress	July 23–30, 2018	Fredenil Castro	NUP	Gloria Macapagal Arroyo	PDP–Laban	Danilo Suarez	Lakas
17th Congress	July 30, 2018 – January 21, 2019	Rolando Andaya Jr.	NPC	Gloria Macapagal Arroyo	PDP–Laban	Danilo Suarez	Lakas
17th Congress	January 21 – June 30, 2019	Fredenil Castro	NUP	Gloria Macapagal Arroyo	PDP–Laban	Danilo Suarez	Lakas
18th Congress	July 22, 2019 – October 12, 2020	Martin Romualdez	Lakas	Alan Peter Cayetano	Nacionalista	Benny Abante	NUP
18th Congress	October 12–16, 2020	Martin Romualdez	Lakas	Lord Allan Velasco	PDP–Laban	Benny Abante	NUP
18th Congress	October 16, 2020 – June 30, 2022	Martin Romualdez	Lakas	Lord Allan Velasco	PDP–Laban	Joseph Stephen Paduano	Abang Lingkod
19th Congress	July 25, 2022 – June 30, 2025	Mannix Dalipe	Lakas	Martin Romualdez	Lakas	Marcelino Libanan	4Ps
20th Congress	July 28 – September 17, 2025	Sandro Marcos	PFP	Martin Romualdez	Lakas	Marcelino Libanan	4Ps
20th Congress	September 17, 2025 – present	Sandro Marcos	PFP	Bojie Dy	PFP	Marcelino Libanan	4Ps
20th Congress	September 17, 2025 – present	Sandro Marcos	Lakas	Bojie Dy	PFP	Marcelino Libanan	4Ps

== List of deputy and assistant floor leaders ==
=== House of Representatives (1987–present) ===
==== Senior deputy majority leaders ====
Legislature	Officeholder	Party	Constituency	Tenure
18th Congress	Jesus Crispin Remulla	NUP	Cavite–7th	July 22, 2019 – June 30, 2022
19th Congress	Sandro Marcos	PFP	Ilocos Norte–1st	July 25, 2022 – June 30, 2025
20th Congress	Lorenz Defensor	NUP	Iloilo–3rd	July 28, 2025 – present

==== Deputy majority leaders ====
Legislature	Officeholder	Party	Constituency	Tenure
17th Congress	Juan Pablo Bondoc	PDP–Laban	Pampanga–4th	July 25, 2016 – June 30, 2019
17th Congress	Sherwin Tugna	CIBAC	Party-list	July 25, 2016 – June 30, 2019
18th Congress	Mikey Arroyo	Lakas	Pampanga–2nd	July 23, 2019 – June 30, 2022
18th Congress	Lianda Bolilia	Nacionalista	Batangas–4th	July 23, 2019 – June 30, 2022
18th Congress	Cristal Bagatsing	NUP	Manila–5th	July 23, 2019 – June 30, 2022
18th Congress	Juan Pablo Bondoc	PDP–Laban	Pampanga–4th	July 23, 2019 – June 30, 2022
18th Congress	Christopher de Venecia	Lakas	Pangasinan–4th	July 23, 2019 – June 30, 2022
19th Congress	David Suarez	Lakas	Quezon–2nd	July 26, 2022 – June 30, 2025
19th Congress	Josephine Lacson-Noel	NPC	Malabon at-large	July 26, 2022 – June 30, 2025
19th Congress	Marlyn Primicias-Agabas	Lakas	Pangasinan–6th	July 26, 2022 – June 30, 2025
19th Congress	Lianda Bolilia	Nacionalista	Batangas–4th	July 26, 2022 – June 30, 2025
19th Congress	Franz Pumaren	NUP	Quezon City–3rd	July 26, 2022 – June 30, 2025
19th Congress	Jude Acidre	Tingog	Party-list	July 26, 2022 – June 30, 2025
19th Congress	Wilter Palma	Lakas	Zamboanga Sibugay–1st	July 26, 2022 – June 30, 2025
19th Congress	Lorenz Defensor	NUP	Iloilo–3rd	July 26, 2022 – June 30, 2025
19th Congress	Carlo Lisandro Gonzales	Marino	Party-list	July 26, 2022 – June 30, 2025
19th Congress	Jose Teves Jr.	TGP	Party-list	July 26, 2022 – June 30, 2025
19th Congress	Julienne Baronda	Lakas	Iloilo City at-large	July 26, 2022 – June 30, 2025
19th Congress	Tonypet Albano	Lakas	Isabela–1st	July 26, 2022 – June 30, 2025
19th Congress	Ramon Nolasco Jr.	Lakas	Cagayan–1st	July 26, 2022 – June 30, 2025
19th Congress	Alfred delos Santos	Ang Probinsyano	Party-list	July 26, 2022 – June 30, 2025
19th Congress	Janette Garin	Lakas	Iloilo–1st	July 26, 2022 – June 30, 2025
19th Congress	Neptali Gonzales II	NUP	Mandaluyong at-large	July 26, 2022 – June 30, 2025
19th Congress	Benny Abante	NUP	Manila–6th	July 26, 2022 – June 30, 2025
20th Congress	Julienne Baronda	Lakas	Iloilo City at-large	July 29, 2025 – present
20th Congress	Marlyn Primicias-Agabas	Lakas	Pangasinan–6th	July 29, 2025 – present
20th Congress	Zia Alonto Adiong	Lakas	Lanao del Sur–1st	July 29, 2025 – October 10, 2025
20th Congress	Patrick Michael Vargas	Lakas (until 2026)	Quezon City–5th	July 29, 2025 – present
20th Congress	Patrick Michael Vargas	PFP (from 2026)	Quezon City–5th	July 29, 2025 – present
20th Congress	Samantha Santos	Lakas	Cotabato–3rd	July 29, 2025 – present
20th Congress	Ernix Dionisio	Lakas	Manila–1st	July 29, 2025 – present
20th Congress	Victoria Yu	Lakas	Zamboanga del Sur–2nd	July 29, 2025 – present
20th Congress	Arnan Panaligan	Lakas	Oriental Mindoro–1st	July 29, 2025 – present
20th Congress	Mica Gonzales	Lakas	Pampanga–3rd	July 29, 2025 – present
20th Congress	Dette Escudero	NPC	Sorsogon–1st	July 29, 2025 – present
20th Congress	Ivan Howard Guintu	Independent	Capiz–1st	July 29, 2025 – present
20th Congress	Wowo Fortes	NPC	Sorsogon–2nd	July 29, 2025 – present
20th Congress	Gil Acosta Jr.	Lakas	Palawan–3rd	July 29, 2025 – present
20th Congress	Adrian Jay Advincula	NUP	Cavite–3rd	July 29, 2025 – present
20th Congress	Anna Veloso-Tuazon	NUP	Leyte–3rd	July 29, 2025 – present
20th Congress	Crispin Diego Remulla	NUP	Cavite–7th	July 29, 2025 – present
20th Congress	Luigi Villafuerte	NUP	Camarines Sur–2nd	July 29, 2025 – present
20th Congress	Jose Teves Jr.	TGP	Party-list	July 29, 2025 – present
20th Congress	Munir Arbison Jr.	KAPUSO PM	Party-list	July 29, 2025 – present
20th Congress	Rodge Gutierrez	1-Rider	Party-list	July 29, 2025 – present
20th Congress	Eduardo Rama Jr.	Lakas	Cebu City–2nd	July 30, 2025 – present

==== Assistant majority leaders ====
Legislature	Officeholder	Party	Constituency	Tenure
18th Congress	Ria Christina Fariñas	PDP–Laban	Ilocos Norte–1st	July 23, 2019 – June 30, 2022
18th Congress	Camille Villar	Nacionalista	Las Piñas at-large	July 23, 2019 – June 30, 2022
18th Congress	David Suarez	Nacionalista	Quezon–2nd	July 23, 2019 – June 30, 2022
19th Congress	Anna Veloso-Tuazon	NUP	Leyte–3rd	July 26, 2022 – June 30, 2025
19th Congress	Inno Dy	Lakas	Isabela–6th	July 26, 2022 – June 30, 2025
19th Congress	Paolo Ortega	Lakas	La Union–1st	July 26, 2022 – June 30, 2025
19th Congress	Patrick Michael Vargas	Lakas	Quezon City–5th	July 26, 2022 – June 30, 2025
19th Congress	Ando Oaminal	Lakas	Misamis Occidental–2nd	July 26, 2022 – June 30, 2025
19th Congress	Jaime Cojuangco	NPC	Tarlac–1st	July 26, 2022 – June 30, 2025
19th Congress	Richard Gomez	PFP	Leyte–4th	July 26, 2022 – June 30, 2025
19th Congress	Jil Bongalon	Ako Bicol	Party-list	July 26, 2022 – June 30, 2025
19th Congress	Zia Alonto Adiong	Lakas	Lanao del Sur–1st	July 26, 2022 – June 30, 2025
19th Congress	Adrian Jay Advincula	NUP	Cavite–3rd	July 26, 2022 – June 30, 2025
19th Congress	Jay Khonghun	Lakas	Zambales–1st	July 26, 2022 – June 30, 2025
19th Congress	Arnan Panaligan	Lakas	Oriental Mindoro–1st	July 26, 2022 – June 30, 2025
19th Congress	Samantha Santos	Lakas	Cotabato–3rd	July 26, 2022 – June 30, 2025
19th Congress	Mika Suansing	Lakas	Nueva Ecija–1st	July 26, 2022 – June 30, 2025
19th Congress	Maan Teodoro	NUP	Marikina–1st	July 26, 2022 – June 30, 2025
19th Congress	Migs Nograles	PBA	Party-list	July 26, 2022 – June 30, 2025
19th Congress	Bryan Revilla	Agimat	Party-list	July 26, 2022 – June 30, 2025
19th Congress	Aniela Tolentino	NUP	Cavite–8th	July 26, 2022 – June 30, 2025
19th Congress	Rhea Gullas	Lakas	Cebu–1st	July 26, 2022 – June 30, 2025
19th Congress	Laarni Roque	Nacionalista	Bukidnon–4th	July 26, 2022 – June 30, 2025
19th Congress	Pammy Zamora	Lakas	Taguig–2nd	July 26, 2022 – June 30, 2025
19th Congress	Dette Escudero	NPC	Sorsogon–1st	July 26, 2022 – June 30, 2025
19th Congress	Keith Micah Tan	NPC	Quezon–4th	July 26, 2022 – June 30, 2025
19th Congress	Loreto Acharon	NPC	General Santos at-large	July 26, 2022 – June 30, 2025
19th Congress	Wowo Fortes	NPC	Sorsogon–2nd	July 26, 2022 – June 30, 2025
19th Congress	Irene Gay Saulog	Kalinga	Party-list	July 26, 2022 – June 30, 2025
19th Congress	Jeffrey Soriano	ACT-CIS	Party-list	July 26, 2022 – February 22, 2023 (Note: Resigned)
19th Congress	Victoria Yu	Lakas	Zamboanga del Sur–2nd	July 26, 2022 – June 30, 2025
19th Congress	Erwin Tulfo	ACT-CIS	Party-list	May 30, 2023 (Note: Replaced Jeffrey Soriano in his vacated post.) – June 30, 2025
20th Congress	Dimple Mastura	Lakas	Maguindanao del Norte at-large	July 29, 2025 – present
20th Congress	Rhea Gullas	Lakas	Cebu–1st	July 29, 2025 – present
20th Congress	Daphne Lagon	Lakas	Cebu–6th	July 29, 2025 – present
20th Congress	Pinpin Uy	Lakas	Zamboanga del Norte–1st	July 29, 2025 – present
20th Congress	Agay Cruz	Lakas (until 2026)	Bulacan–5th	July 29, 2025 – present
20th Congress	Agay Cruz	PFP (from 2026)	Bulacan–5th	July 29, 2025 – present
20th Congress	Oyo Uy	Lakas	Davao del Norte–1st	July 29, 2025 – present
20th Congress	Jhong Ceniza	Lakas	Davao de Oro–2nd	July 29, 2025 – present
20th Congress	Ronald Singson	NPC	Ilocos Sur–1st	July 29, 2025 – present
20th Congress	Mark Anthony Santos	Independent	Las Piñas at-large	July 29, 2025 – present
20th Congress	King Collantes	NPC	Batangas–3rd	July 29, 2025 – present
20th Congress	Patricia Calderon	NPC	Cebu–7th	July 29, 2025 – present
20th Congress	Arjo Atayde	Nacionalista (until 2026)	Quezon City–1st	July 29, 2025 – present
20th Congress	Arjo Atayde	NUP (from 2026)	Quezon City–1st	July 29, 2025 – present
20th Congress	Alexandria Gonzales	NUP	Mandaluyong at-large	July 29, 2025 – present
20th Congress	John Geesnell Yap	LDP (until 2026)	Bohol–1st	July 29, 2025 – present
20th Congress	John Geesnell Yap	NUP (from 2026)	Bohol–1st	July 29, 2025 – present
20th Congress	Kiko Barzaga	NUP	Cavite–4th	July 29, 2025 – September 10, 2025
20th Congress	Ralph Tulfo	PFP	Quezon City–2nd	July 29, 2025 – present
20th Congress	Esmael Mangudadatu	PFP	Maguindanao del Sur at-large	July 29, 2025 – present
20th Congress	Bella Suansing	PFP	Sultan Kudarat–2nd	July 29, 2025 – present
20th Congress	Javi Benitez	PFP	Negros Occidental–3rd	July 29, 2025 – present
20th Congress	Katrina Reiko Chua-Tai	Independent	Zamboanga City–1st	July 29, 2025 – present
20th Congress	Daniel Bocobo	Nacionalista	Taguig–Pateros–2nd	July 29, 2025 – present
20th Congress	Ryan Recto	Nacionalista	Batangas–6th	July 29, 2025 – present
20th Congress	James Ang Jr.	Uswag Ilonggo	Party-list	July 29, 2025 – present
20th Congress	Brian Poe Llamanzares	FPJ Panday Bayanihan	Party-list	July 29, 2025 – present
20th Congress	Johanne Monich Bautista	TRABAHO	Party-list	July 29, 2025 – present
20th Congress	Antonino Roman III	Lakas	Bataan–1st	July 30, 2025 – present
20th Congress	Ading Cruz	Nacionalista	Taguig–Pateros–1st	July 30, 2025 – present
20th Congress	Arman Dimaguila	Lakas	Biñan at-large	July 30, 2025 – present
20th Congress	Bel Zamora	Lakas	San Juan at-large	August 4, 2025 – present
20th Congress	Aniela Tolentino	NUP	Cavite–8th	September 15, 2025 – present
20th Congress	Zia Alonto Adiong	Lakas	Lanao del Sur–1st	October 10, 2025 – present
20th Congress	Jonathan Keith Flores	Lakas	Bukidnon–2nd	December 3, 2025 – present
20th Congress	Lordan Suan	Lakas (until 2026)	Cagayan de Oro–1st	December 3, 2025 – present
20th Congress	Lordan Suan	PFP (from 2026)	Cagayan de Oro–1st	December 3, 2025 – present

==== Senior deputy minority leaders ====
Legislature	Officeholder	Party	Constituency	Tenure
18th Congress	Janette Garin	NUP	Iloilo–1st	July 23, 2019 – June 30, 2022
19th Congress	Paul Daza	NUP	Northern Samar–1st	July 26, 2022 – June 30, 2025
20th Congress	Edgar Erice	Liberal	Caloocan–2nd	July 30, 2025 – March 3, 2026
20th Congress	Leila de Lima	ML	Party-list	March 3, 2026 – present

==== Deputy minority leaders ====
Legislature	Officeholder	Party	Constituency	Tenure
18th Congress	Kit Belmonte	Liberal	Quezon City–6th	July 23, 2019 – June 30, 2022
18th Congress	Carlos Isagani Zarate	Bayan Muna	Party-list	July 24, 2019 – June 30, 2022
19th Congress	Bernadette Herrera	BH	Party-list	July 26, 2022 – June 30, 2025
19th Congress	Presley de Jesus	PHILRECA	Party-list	July 26, 2022 – June 30, 2025
19th Congress	Mujiv Hataman	BUP	Basilan at-large	July 26, 2022 – June 30, 2025
19th Congress	France Castro	ACT Teachers	Party-list	July 26, 2022 – June 30, 2025
19th Congress	Reynolds Michael Tan	Lakas	Samar–2nd	July 26, 2022 – June 30, 2025
19th Congress	Lex Anthony Colada	AAMBIS-Owa	Party-list	July 26, 2022 – June 30, 2025
19th Congress	Bem Noel	An Waray	Party-list	July 26, 2022 – September 27, 2023 (Note: Removed after the Commission on Elections cancelled An Waray's registration as a party-list on August 14, 2023.)
20th Congress	Leila de Lima	ML	Party-list	July 30, 2025 – March 3, 2026
20th Congress	Presley de Jesus	PHILRECA	Party-list	July 30, 2025 – present
20th Congress	Sergio Dagooc	APEC	Party-list	July 30, 2025 – present
20th Congress	Kaka Bag-ao	Liberal	Dinagat Islands at-large	July 30, 2025 – present
20th Congress	Stephen James Tan	Nacionalista	Samar–1st	July 30, 2025 – present
20th Congress	Perci Cendaña	Akbayan	Party-list	July 30, 2025 – present
20th Congress	Antonio Tinio	ACT Teachers	Party-list	July 30, 2025 – present
20th Congress	Bong Suntay	UNA	Quezon City–4th	July 30, 2025 – present
20th Congress	Jernie Jett Nisay	Pusong Pinoy	Party-list	July 30, 2025 – present
20th Congress	Reynolds Michael Tan	Lakas	Samar–2nd	July 30, 2025 – present
20th Congress	Krisel Lagman	Liberal	Albay–1st	July 30, 2025 – present

==== Assistant minority leaders ====
Legislature	Term	Officeholder	Party	Constituency	Tenure
19th Congress	2022–2025	Gabriel Bordado	Liberal	Camarines Sur–3rd	July 26, 2022 – June 30, 2025
19th Congress	2022–2025	Marissa Magsino	OFW	Party-list	July 26, 2022 – June 30, 2025
19th Congress	2022–2025	Harris Ongchuan	NUP	Northern Samar–2nd	July 26, 2022 – June 30, 2025
19th Congress	2022–2025	Jonathan Clement Abalos	4Ps	Party-list	July 26, 2022 – June 30, 2025
19th Congress	2022–2025	Nicolas Enciso VIII	Bicol Saro	Party-list	July 26, 2022 – June 30, 2025
19th Congress	2022–2025	Arlene Brosas	Gabriela	Party-list	July 26, 2022 – June 30, 2025
19th Congress	2022–2025	Sergio Dagooc	APEC	Party-list	July 26, 2022 – June 30, 2025
20th Congress	2025–2028	Sheen Gonzales	Independent (until 2026)	Eastern Samar at-large	July 30, 2025 – present
20th Congress	2025–2028	Sheen Gonzales	NUP (from 2026)	Eastern Samar at-large	July 30, 2025 – present
20th Congress	2025–2028	Renee Co	Kabataan	Party-list	July 30, 2025 – present
20th Congress	2025–2028	Chel Diokno	Akbayan	Party-list	July 30, 2025 – present
20th Congress	2025–2028	Roberto Nazal Jr.	BH	Party-list	July 30, 2025 – present
20th Congress	2025–2028	Niko Raul Daza	NUP	Northern Samar–1st	July 30, 2025 – present
20th Congress	2025–2028	Jan Rurik Padiernos	GP	Party-list	July 30, 2025 – present
20th Congress	2025–2028	Audrey Zubiri	PFP	Bukidnon–3rd	July 30, 2025 – present
20th Congress	2025–2028	Iris Marie Montes	4K	Party-list	July 30, 2025 – present
20th Congress	2025–2028	Sarah Elago	Gabriela	Party-list	September 23, 2025 – present

== See also ==
- Floor leaders of the Senate of the Philippines
