= Roberto Nazal Jr. =

Filipino politician

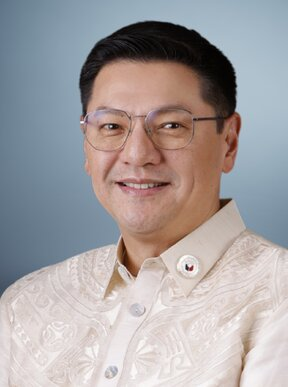
- Official portrait, 2025

Member of the Philippine House of Representatives for the Bagong Henerasyon party-list
- Incumbent
- Assumed office June 30, 2025
- Preceded by: Bernadette Herrera

Member of the Philippine House of Representatives for the Magsasaka Partylist
- In office October 10, 2022 – August 15, 2024

Assistant Minority Floor Leader
- Incumbent
- Assumed office July 30, 2025
- Leader: Marcelino Libanan

Personal details
- Born: Roberto Gerard Lopez Nazal Jr.
- Domestic partner: Bernadette Herrera
- Education: Ateneo de Manila University; University of Asia and the Pacific
- Occupation: Politician, businessman

Roberto Gerard "Robert" Lopez Nazal Jr. is a Filipino politician and businessman who engaged in the infrastructure, mining, and consumer goods industries. He is a member of the House of Representatives of the Philippines for the Bagong Henerasyon party-list since 2025.

== Education ==
Nazal obtained his undergraduate degree from the Ateneo de Manila University. He subsequently earned a post-graduate degree in Business Economics from the University of Asia and the Pacific.

== Business career ==
Nazal heads at least seven companies in the Philippines. He is the CEO of MRMJ Earthmovers Corporation, a mining company which extracts nickel, iron ore, basalt, and andesite in sites across the Philippines. He was also CEO of PERRC Construction and Development Corporation, a contractor for seaports, roads, and bridges.

Nazal also owns the YSA Skin Care Corp. which his doctor mother Isabel Nazal established in 1986.

== Political career ==
=== Magsasaka representative (2022–24) ===
Nazal founded the Pasahero Partylist for the purpose of taking part at the 2022 election. Pasahero failed to win sufficient votes to win a seat in the House of Representatives. Nazal was reportedly Pasahero's first nominee. However, records of the Commission on Election (COMELEC) did not show Nazal as a nominee of Pasehero.

Nazal was regardless proclaimed by the COMELEC as a representative of another organization, Magsasaka Partylist on October 10, 2022. Magsasaka was engaged in a leadership dispute, with Argel Joseph Cabatbat's faction opposing Nazal's proclamation which is backed by a rival faction headed by Soliman Villamin Jr. COMELEC at the time recognized Villamin's faction as legitimate, with King Cortez and Villamin Jr. as the first and second nominees on record. The two however withdrew, paving way for originally third nominee Nazal to fill in the seat.

On August 15, 2024, the Supreme Court overruled the COMELEC proclamation and recognized the validity of Villamin's expulsion from the party in 2019, effectively recognizing Cabatbat as the official congressional representative.

=== Bagong Henerasyon representative (2025–present) ===
Nazal ran as first nominee of Bagong Henerasyon (BH) for the 2025 election. BH won a single seat but the proclamation by the COMELEC was suspended pending the resolution of a disqualification case. However, the petition was dismissed on May 22, due to the complainant's failure to comply with the mandatory requirements in filing petitions.

Nazal pledged to continue the work of Bernadette Herrera, his predecessor as BH representative. He filed the following bills:

- Private Hospital Malasakit Centers Bill – institutionalizes the establishment of Malasakit Centers in private hospitals to provide easier access to medical assistance for patients in need
- Adequate Food Framework Bill – formalizes a national food security policy
- Financial Assistance for Solo Parents Program (FASPP) Bill – institutionalizes monthly aid for Single parent through the Department of Social Welfare and Development; Nazal inherited this from Herrera who has proposed this legislation before
- Goodbye 5-6 Bill – a measure against the loan shark scheme which also mandates a national interest rate cap
- Gobyernong Walang Padrino Bill – proposes the banning of political patronage in government appointments, promotions, and distribution of benefits
- Philippine Future Skills Bill – institutionalizes artificial intelligence, coding, data science, climate adaptation, and green technologies in basic and higher education
