= 2010 Philippine House of Representatives party-list election =

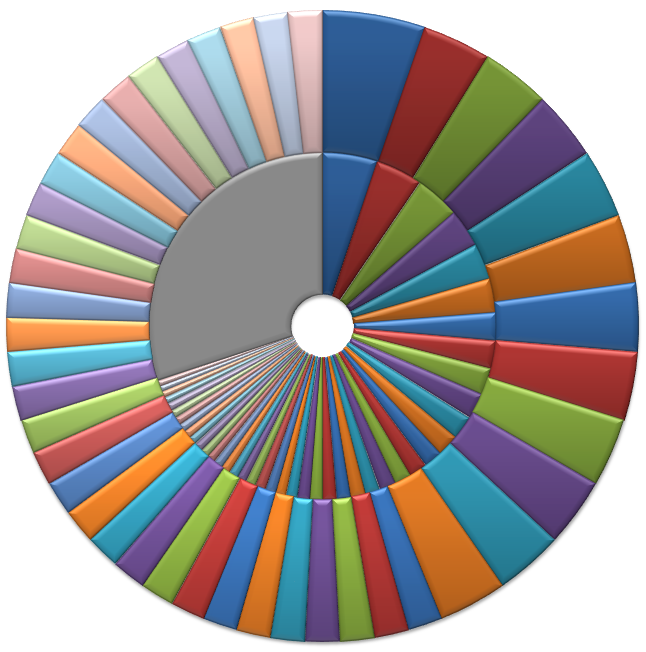
Proportion of votes (inner ring) as compared to the proportion of seats (outer ring). Each party is given one color and one slice, and are arranged in descending order of votes. The parties that did not win a seat is given a single slice and color (gray).

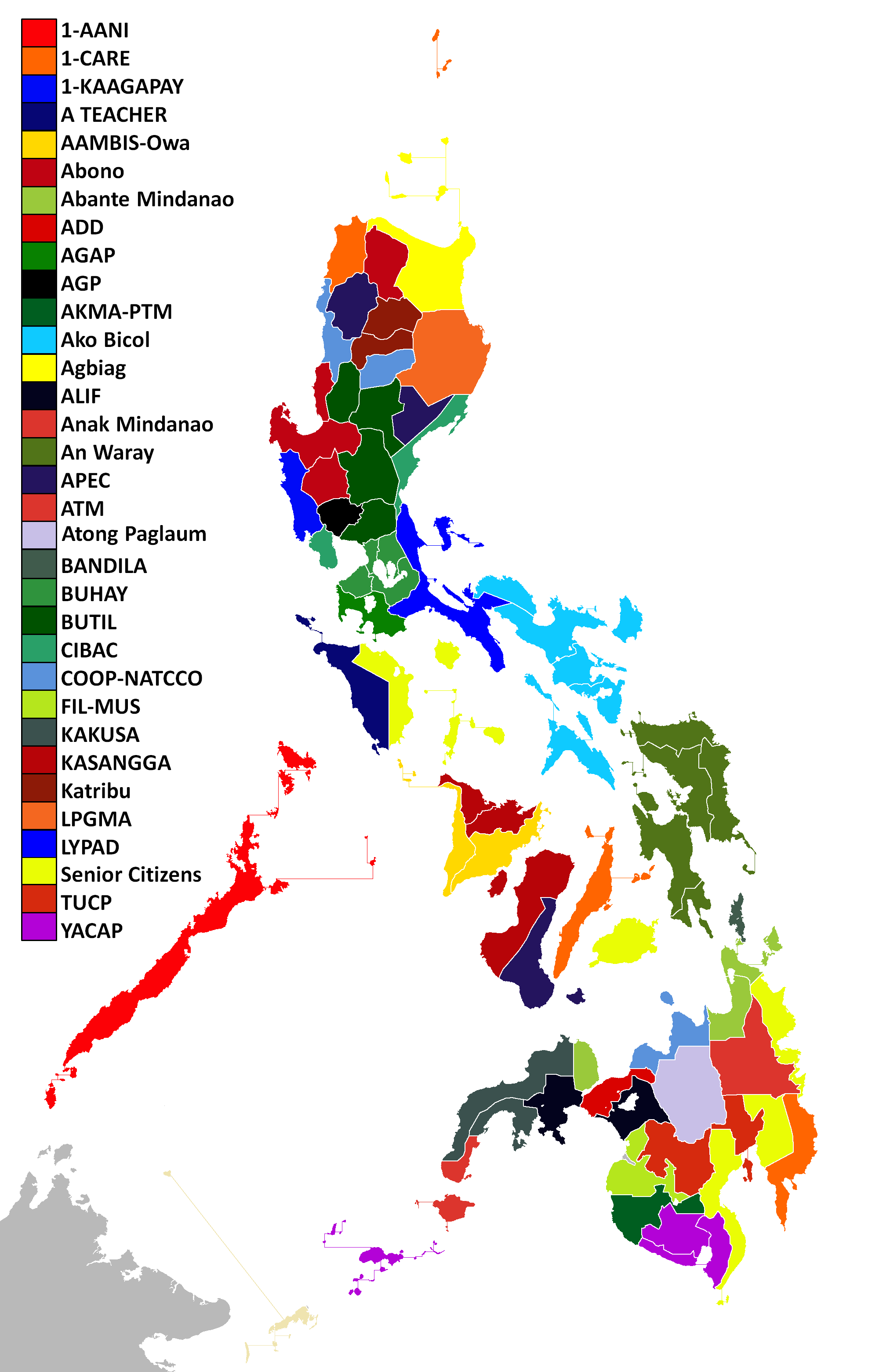
Provincial results: Parties that won at least a plurality of the vote in each province. Note that election is not via per province but nationwide as a single at-large "district".

The 2010 House of Representatives of the Philippines party-list election was on May 10, 2010. The whole country was one at-large district, where parties nominate three persons to be their candidates, ranked in order of which they'll be seated if elected. The elected representatives will serve in the 15th Congress.

Candidates from the district elections are not allowed to be nominated by the parties participating in the party-list election, nor are parties who have candidates in the district elections may be allowed to join the party-list election; the parties in the party-list election must represent a distinct "sector" in the society such as women, laborers and the like.

In the election, the voter elects the party, not the nominees of the party; a voter may not be able to influence how the nominees are listed on election day, except for joining the party beforehand. If the party surpasses 2% of the national vote, the person first nominated by the party will be seated. Additional seats can be won by multiplying the percentage of the votes the party got, with the difference of number of seats the party already has (1), and the number of seats allocated for sectoral organizations (57), disregarding decimals, with no party getting more than two additional seats. However, usually only the party with the most votes gets the two additional seats, the other parties will get only one additional seat. If the number of seated representatives is less than the 20% quota of party-list representatives in Congress (57 for the 15th Congress), the unfilled seats will be filled up by the remaining parties in descending order of votes garnered until are seats are filled up. Note that with more than a hundred parties participating, and with the three-seat cap, the seats that the parties with 2% of the vote or more will always be less than the 20% allocation.

== Background ==
Prior to the election, the Commission on Elections (COMELEC) expected an increase of party-list organizations seeking accreditation from the 153 organizations that applied for accreditation during the 2007 elections. The COMELEC also de-listed 25 party-list organizations for either failing to participate in the last two elections or did not obtain two percent of the votes cast. However, the COMELEC said the two percent vote requirement does not cover the organizations that won a congressional seat based on a recent Supreme Court ruling. Militant groups Migrante and Sanlakas protested such de-listment, saying that they were not covered by the 2% rule, and that such rule is unconstitutional. Another 8 such organizations also filed a motion for reconsideration or a verified opposition against their de-listment.

After purging the party-list roster, the COMELEC then acted upon the organizations that filed their manifestations of intent to run. LGBT group Ang Ladlad appealed their disqualification after the COMELEC's First Division disqualified the organization due to "moral grounds," citing the Bible and the Qur'an. Party leader Danton Remoto, a professor at Ateneo de Manila University, cited the Universal Declaration on Human Rights and the International Covenant on Civil and Political Rights as reasons why Ang Ladlad should be re-instated. Remoto would then appeal to the commission en banc. The COMELEC also disqualified Alliance of Concerned Teachers (ACT) and government employees union Courage. The commission's First Division disqualified ACT after it had failed to prove that it exists "in most of the regions;" the commission said that, Courage on the other hand, "exists in Western Visayas, Davao del Sur, a town in Lanao del Norte and Rizal and some cities in Metro Manila," and that it failed to prove that it represents a "marginalized and under-represented sector."

In December, the commission en banc denied Ang Ladlad's motion for reconsideration with finality as Remoto said he would elevate the case to the Supreme Court. In January 2010, the Supreme Court issued a temporary restraining order to the COMELEC on disqualifying Ang Ladlad.

With the COMELEC prevented from disqualifying Ang Ladlad, the organization along with 143 others were included in the final list of accredited party-list organizations, although the status may change if the court sides with COMELEC on the issue. Under Resolution 8745, six additional party-list groups were accredited, bringing the total to 150.

The party-list election has been hit by allegations that several parties are fronts by the ruling administration. Bagong Alyansang Makabayan (BAYAN), a coalition of left-leaning party-lists, and election watchdog Kontra Daya said that nine party-lists were connected to the Arroyo political family. The parties and their first nominee cited were:

- Ang Galing Pinoy, a party that claims to represents security guards: outgoing second district of Pampanga congressman Mikey Arroyo. Arroyo, the son of president Gloria Macapagal Arroyo willingly dropped his intention to run in Pampanga's 2nd district to let his mother run.
- Transport group 1-UTAK: Secretary of Energy Angelo Reyes
- Pilipino Association for Country – Urban Poor Youth Advancement and Welfare (PACYAW), which claims to advocate sports development in the country: former Tourism assistant secretary Janet Lazatin as its first nominee
- Kabalikat ng Mamamayan (KABAYAN)

The administration distanced itself from the six pro-government parties insisting it has not endorsed any group supposedly to augment the administration's representation in Congress, saying that "it is up to the COMELEC to judge and issue a decision on the matter."

On April 8, 2010, the Supreme Court ruled that Ang Ladlad was allowed to run in the 2010 election, saying with a unanimous vote that what is immoral is not necessary illegal.

== Results ==
On May 31, the leading parties in the party-list election were declared by the commission as winners; deferred are the parties (not nominees) that have pending disqualification cases against them. Ang Galing Pinoy's proclamation, the party of incumbent Pampanga 2nd district representative Mikey Arroyo was recalled as Arroyo has a pending disqualification notice against him, and he is their #1 nominee. The winners were:

- 3 seats:
1. Ako Bicol
- 2 seats each:
1. Coalition of Associations of Senior Citizens in the Philippines
2. Akbayan Citizens' Action Party
3. Gabriela Women's Party
4. Cooperative NATCCO Network Party
5. Abono
6. Bayan Muna
7. An Waray
8. Buhay
- 1 seat each:
1. Agricultural Sector Alliance of the Philippines
2. Alliance for Barangay Concerns
3. Butil Farmers Party
4. Anakpawis
5. Kabataan
6. Abante Mindanao
7. Alliance of Concerned Teachers
8. Youth Against Corruption and Poverty
9. Kasangga sa Kaunlaran
10. Bagong Henerasyon
11. Ang Galing Pinoy
12. Agbiag! Timpuyog Ilocano
13. Puwersa ng Bayaning Atleta
14. Arts, Business and Science Professionals
15. Trade Union Congress Party
16. Alyansa ng mga Grupong Haligi ng Agham at Teknolohiya para sa Mamamayan
17. Democratic Independent Workers' Association
18. Kapatiran ng mga Nakulong ng Walang Sala
19. Kalinga-Advocacy for Social Empowerment and Nation Building Through Easing Poverty
20. Alagad
21. Una Ang Pamilya
22. Alliance of Volunteer Educators

Total seats: 41, with 16 unfilled.

Incumbents nominated by their parties are italicized; proclaimed winners are boldfaced. Seats in parentheses indicates the number of seats to be won by the party pending disqualification cases, while parties highlighted are disqualified prior to the election.

Party	Votes	%	+/–	Seats	+/–
Ako Bicol Political Party	1,524,006	5.06	New	3	New
Senior Citizens Partylist	1,296,950	4.31	+2.98	2	+1
Buhay Hayaan Yumabong	1,250,467	4.16	−3.14	2	−1
Akbayan	1,061,947	3.53	+0.62	2	0
Gabriela Women's Party	1,006,752	3.35	−0.53	2	0
Cooperative NATCCO Network Party	944,864	3.14	+0.58	2	0
1st Consumers Alliance for Rural Energy	770,015	2.56	New	2	New
Abono	766,993	2.55	+0.43	2	0
Bayan Muna	750,100	2.49	−3.62	2	−1
An Waray	712,405	2.37	+0.36	2	0
Citizens' Battle Against Corruption	653,399	2.17	−2.55	2	0
A Teacher Partylist	617,898	2.05	−1.01	2	0
Agricultural Sector Alliance of the Philippines	516,052	1.71	−0.34	1	−1
Butil Farmers Party	507,091	1.69	−0.86	1	−1
Alliance for Barangay Concerns	471,407	1.57	+1.01	0	0
Anakpawis	447,201	1.49	−0.82	1	−1
Kabataan	418,776	1.39	−0.04	1	0
LPG Marketers Association	417,771	1.39	New	1	New
Abante Mindanao	378,345	1.26	New	1	New
ACT Teachers	372,903	1.24	New	1	New
Ang Asosasyon Sang Mangunguma nga Bisaya-Owa Mangunguma	357,804	1.19	New	1	New
You Against Corruption and Poverty	337,487	1.12	−0.95	1	0
Association of Philippine Electric Cooperatives	313,689	1.04	−2.83	1	−1
Alliance for Nationalism and Democracy	297,984	0.99	−0.19	1	0
Kasangga sa Kaunlaran	296,695	0.99	−0.07	1	0
Bagong Henerasyon	293,079	0.97	New	1	New
Ang Galing Pinoy	269,273	0.89	+0.78	1	New
Agbiag! Timpuyog Ilocano	263,234	0.87	+0.55	1	New
Puwersa ng Bayaning Atleta	258,869	0.86	+0.41	1	New
Arts, Business and Science Professionals	257,457	0.86	−0.61	1	0
Trade Union Congress Party	245,031	0.81	−0.21	1	0
Alyansa ng mga Grupong Haligi ng Agham at Teknolohiya Para sa Mamamayan	242,630	0.81	−0.10	1	New
Democratic Independent Workers' Association	239,029	0.79	+0.12	1	New
Kapatiran ng mga Nakulong na Walang Sala	234,788	0.78	−0.65	1	0
Kalinga-Advocacy for Social Empowerment and Nation Building Through Easing Poverty	230,516	0.77	New	1	New
Ang Laban ng Indigong Filipino	227,431	0.76	−0.67	1	0
Alagad	227,281	0.76	−1.88	1	−1
1-United Transport Koalisyon	220,617	0.73	−0.30	1	0
Una ang Pamilya	218,181	0.73	+0.11	1	New
Alliance of Volunteer Educators	216,100	0.72	+0.03	1	New
Aangat Tayo	177,503	0.59	−0.66	1	0
Adhikaing Tinataguyod ng Kooperatiba	175,636	0.58	New	1	New
Kasosyo Producer-Consumer Exchange Association	171,589	0.57	+0.52	1	New
Association of Laborers and Employees	170,543	0.57	New	1	New
Alay Buhay Community Development Foundation	164,044	0.55	New	1	New
Aksyon Magsasaka Partido Tinig ng Masa	162,972	0.54	New	0	0
Anak Mindanao	161,418	0.54	−1.63	0	−2
Katipunan ng mga Anak ng Bayan All Filipino Democratic Movement	161,127	0.54	New	0	0
Veterans Freedom Party	155,672	0.52	−0.71	0	−1
Alliance for Rural and Agrarian Reconstruction	147,408	0.49	New	0	0
Atong Paglaum	146,363	0.49	New	0	0
Pilipino Association for Country-Urban Poor Youth Advancement and Welfare	143,553	0.48	New	0	0
Abante Tribung Makabansa	142,988	0.48	New	0	0
Angat Ating Kabuhayan Pilipinas	142,417	0.47	−0.42	0	0
Partido ng Manggagawa	140,257	0.47	−0.27	0	0
Action for Dynamic Development	139,494	0.46	+0.16	0	0
Alyansang Bayanihan ng mga Magsasaka Manggagawang-Bukid at Mangingisda	138,310	0.46	−0.91	0	−1
Alliance Transport Sector	136,828	0.45	+0.36	0	0
Aksyon ng Mamamayang Nagkakaisa	133,048	0.44	+0.24	0	0
Kaunlaran ng Agrikultura Asensadong Probinsya Angat ng Bayan	130,498	0.43	New	0	0
Barangay Natin	129,089	0.43	−0.67	0	−1
1Guardians Nationalist of the Philippines	121,508	0.40	New	0	0
1-Ako Babaeng Astig Aasenso	121,405	0.40	New	0	0
Babae Para sa Kaunlaran	117,518	0.39	+0.16	0	0
Bagong Bayan na Nagtataguyod ng Demokratikong Ideolohiya at Layunin	115,964	0.39	+0.05	0	0
Ahon Pinoy	115,789	0.38	+0.04	0	0
Katribu Indigenous People's Sectoral Party	114,966	0.38	New	0	0
Ang Ladlad	114,120	0.38	New	0	0
1-AANI	113,434	0.38	New	0	0
One Advocacy for Health Progress and Opportunity	111,495	0.37	New	0	0
Confederation of Non-Stock Savings and Loan Associations	111,198	0.37	New	0	0
Kabalikat ng Mamamayan	110,085	0.37	New	0	0
Binhi: Partido ng mga Magsasaka Para sa mga Magsasaka	108,174	0.36	New	0	0
Akap Bata	107,478	0.36	New	0	0
Ang Assosiasyon ng mga Trabahador at Pahinante	107,468	0.36	New	0	0
Agila ng Katutubong Pilipino	105,406	0.35	New	0	0
Coconut Farmers Association of Linamon, Lanao del Norte	105,049	0.35	New	0	0
Filipino Muslim Organization	105,033	0.35	New	0	0
Biyayang Bukid	102,191	0.34	+0.24	0	0
Abakada Guro	97,872	0.33	−0.71	0	−1
Firm 24-K Association	96,292	0.32	New	0	0
Abante Ilongo	94,815	0.32	0.11	0	0
Ang Kalusugan Para sa Pinoy	94,209	0.31	New	0	0
Alyansa ng OFW Party	91,663	0.30	New	0	0
Ako Ayoko sa Bawal na Droga	90,511	0.30	New	0	0
Action Brotherhood for Active Dreamers	88,743	0.29	New	0	0
Philippine Coconut Producers Federation	88,536	0.29	−0.68	0	−1
Ang Tagapagtaguyod ng Sikap sa Ikauunlad ng mga Pinoy	88,522	0.29	New	0	0
Pro-Active on Climate Change Leaders	88,457	0.29	New	0	0
Action League of Indigenous Masses	86,491	0.29	New	0	0
Womenpower	86,411	0.29	New	0	0
1st Kabalikat ng Bayan Ginhawang Sangkatauhan	84,687	0.28	New	0	0
Youth League for Peace and Advancement	82,642	0.27	+0.22	0	0
The True Marcos Loyalist (for God Country and People) Association of the Phil.	81,584	0.27	−0.79	0	−1
Partido ng Katutubong Pilipino	80,064	0.27	New	0	0
Ang Tao Muna at Bayan	79,255	0.26	New	0	0
Agapay ng Indigenous Peoples Rights Alliance	77,270	0.26	New	0	0
Bayani	74,993	0.25	New	0	0
Alliance of Associations of Accredited Workers in the Water Sector	74,152	0.25	+0.11	0	0
Vendors and Traders Alliance of Philippines Party	74,041	0.25	+0.04	0	0
Alliance of Mindanao Elders	71,503	0.24	New	0	0
Alliance of People's Organizations	70,901	0.24	+0.14	0	0
Biyaheng Pinoy Labor Association	70,480	0.23	−0.26	0	0
Alma sa Pagkahikaos at Ignoransiya	70,070	0.23	New	0	0
Akbay Pinoy OFW-National	67,946	0.23	−0.27	0	0
Champions for Innovative Employment	67,800	0.23	New	0	0
Organization of Regional Advocates for Good Governance Onward Nation-Building	67,366	0.22	New	0	0
Parents Enabling Parents Coalition Party	65,299	0.22	+0.01	0	0
Ugnayan ng Nagkakaisang Layunin at Adhikaing Dakila	64,746	0.22	New	0	0
Adhikain ng mga Dakilang Anak Maharlika	63,065	0.21	New	0	0
A Blessed Federation of Farmers and Fishermen International	62,529	0.21	New	0	0
Ang Mata'y Alagaan	62,249	0.21	New	0	0
Sulong! Barangay Movement	60,606	0.20	−0.02	0	0
Alliance for Rural Concerns	57,515	0.19	−2.15	0	−2
Ang Agrikultura Natin Isulong	57,190	0.19	New	0	0
Alliance of Bicolnon Party	55,159	0.18	New	0	0
Aabante Emmanuel Civic Association	54,848	0.18	New	0	0
Adhikain at Kilusan ng Ordinaryong Tao Para sa Lupa Hanapbuhay at Kaunlaran	54,182	0.18	New	0	0
Action for Democracy and Development for the Tribal People	53,510	0.18	−0.03	0	0
Kababaihang Lingkod Bayan sa Pilipinas	50,466	0.17	New	0	0
Asosasyon ng mga Maliliit na Negosyanteng Gumaganap	50,127	0.17	−0.10	0	0
Alliance of Advocates in Mining Advancement for National Progress	49,990	0.17	New	0	0
Adhikaing Alay ng Marino sa Sambayanan	49,893	0.17	New	0	0
Agri-Agra Reporma Para sa Magsasaka ng Pilipinas Movement	49,635	0.16	New	0	0
Alagaan Natin Ating Kalusugan	47,828	0.16	New	0	0
Batang Iwas sa Droga Foundation	45,708	0.15	New	0	0
Kalahi Sectoral Party	45,494	0.15	−0.41	0	0
Green Force for the Environment-Sons and Daughters of Mother Earth	44,100	0.15	New	0	0
Advocates for Special Children and Handicapped Movement	41,809	0.14	−0.18	0	0
Association for Righteousness Advocacy in Leadership	41,159	0.14	New	0	0
Ako Agila sa Nagkaisang Magsasaka	39,448	0.13	New	0	0
Anti War/Anti Terror Mindanao Peace Movement	38,050	0.13	New	0	0
Yes We Can	36,819	0.12	New	0	0
Akap Kapatiran Para sa Tangkilikan ng mga Obrero	36,805	0.12	New	0	0
Sectoral Party of ang Minero (Ang Minero)	36,650	0.12	New	0	0
Pamilyang OFW-SME Network Foundation	35,636	0.12	New	0	0
Alliance of Believers Bridge in Attaining Accurate and Meaningful Advancement	34,852	0.12	New	0	0
Itinerant Vendors Alliance of the Philippines	34,785	0.12	New	0	0
Pasang Masda Nationwide	34,769	0.12	New	0	0
Alyansa ng Mamamayang Naghihirap	32,957	0.11	New	0	0
Bago National Cultural Society of the Philippines	32,942	0.11	New	0	0
Abang Lingkod	32,122	0.11	New	0	0
1-Aangat Ka Pilipino	32,048	0.11	New	0	0
Sagip Kapwa Foundation	31,798	0.11	New	0	0
Koalisyon ng mga Katutubong Samahan ng Pilipinas	31,667	0.11	+0.07	0	0
Alliance of National Urban Poor Organizations Assembly	31,330	0.10	New	0	0
Alliance of Regional Coalitions Against People's Poverty	30,845	0.10	New	0	0
United Movement Against Drugs Foundation	30,651	0.10	−1.47	0	−1
Free Workers	30,540	0.10	New	0	0
Small Farmers and Land Tillers Association of the Philippines	30,001	0.10	New	0	0
Social Movement for Active Reform and Transparency	28,617	0.10	New	0	0
Agrarian Development Association	27,521	0.09	New	0	0
First People's Representative for Indigent Student Athletes	27,229	0.09	New	0	0
Ang Kapisanan ng mga Seaman	26,805	0.09	New	0	0
Abante Katutubo	26,593	0.09	New	0	0
Advocates for Penology Enhancement and Legal Assistance	26,133	0.09	New	0	0
Bagong Koalisyon ng Nagkakaisang Samahan sa Sektor ng Transportasyon	25,547	0.08	New	0	0
Abante Bicol Oragon	23,902	0.08	New	0	0
Akbay Kalusugan	23,394	0.08	New	0	0
Alliance of Nationalistic and Genuine Program for Agricultural Development Towards Economic Reform	22,218	0.07	New	0	0
Alliance for Community Transformation and Service	21,475	0.07	New	0	0
Association of Administrator Professionals and Seniors	20,753	0.07	−0.09	0	0
Angkan Katutubo	19,580	0.07	New	0	0
Alyansa Lumad	19,577	0.07	New	0	0
United Caddies and Green Keepers Association of the Philippines	19,221	0.06	New	0	0
Damayan Alliance of the Aging and Disabled Filipinos	19,069	0.06	New	0	0
Bigkis Pinoy Movement	19,027	0.06	−0.42	0	0
Alay Serbisyo (Workers in the Informal Sector Economy)	18,164	0.06	New	0	0
Alyansa ng Media at Showbiz	17,534	0.06	New	0	0
Alay sa Bayan ng Malayang Propesyonal at Repormang Kalakal	17,125	0.06	−0.20	0	0
Alliance for Philippines Security Guards Cooperative	15,595	0.05	New	0	0
Alyansa ng mga Naulila ng mga Tagapagtanggol ng Bayan	15,520	0.05	New	0	0
Kabukluran ng mga Kababaihang Filipina sa Timog Katagalugan	12,430	0.04	−0.02	0	0
National Council for Commuters Protection	12,386	0.04	New	0	0
One Nation Empowered By Technology	12,335	0.04	New	0	0
Ang Partido Demokratiko Rural	11,680	0.04	New	0	0
Abot Tanaw	10,473	0.03	New	0	0
A Convergence for Mindanao Agenda	8,864	0.03	New	0	0
Alliance and Advocates for Senior Citizens' Affairs	7,379	0.02	New	0	0
Alyansa Lumad Mindanao	6,612	0.02	New	0	0
United Filipino Seafarers	6,121	0.02	New	0	0
Binigkis na Interes ng mga Drayber sa Adhikain	4,963	0.02	New	0	0
Citizen Power Movement	4,495	0.01	New	0	0
Alliance of Vigilant Protectors of Aquatic Products	4,324	0.01	New	0	0
Ang Samahan Para sa Magandang Kabuhayan	4,199	0.01	New	0	0
People's Freedom Party	3,883	0.01	New	0	0
Ang National Coalition on Indigenous People's Action	1,217	0.00	New	0	0
**Total**	**30,092,613**	**100.00**	–	**57**	**+4**
Valid votes	30,092,613	78.88	+25.56		
Invalid/blank votes (Note: Includes 781,319 votes for parties that made it to the ballot but were subsequently disqualified.)	8,056,758	21.12	−25.56		
Total votes	**38,149,371**	**100.00**	–		
Registered voters/turnout	51,317,073	74.34	+4.73		
Source: COMELEC

== Aftermath ==
On July 11, 2010, the Commission on Elections (COMELEC) disqualified two nominees of Kasangga sa Kaunlaran namely Teodoro Haresco and Eugenio Lacson on proving they do not support the marginalized sectors. Bagong Alyansang Makabayan (BAYAN) secretary-general Renato Reyes says that "this should now serve as a benchmark for other pending petitions against party-list nominees who do not belong to nor represent the marginalized sectors."

On July 20, 2010, the COMELEC allowed Rep. Arroyo to sit as the representative for Ang Galing Pinoy after he was accepted as the first nominee of the party-list group. The Commission voted 4–2 while one abstained. The COMELEC also proclaimed three more parties as winners: A TEACHER, Butil Farmers Party and 1-UTAK, although the latter's first nominee, Angelo Reyes, was not allowed to take office as he has a pending disqualification case.

While the commission upheld Angelo Reyes nomination by 1-UTAK, on late July, the party withdrew Reyes from their list after the commission's decision was appealed. Reyes, who was prohibited from having his seat at the House of Representatives, appealed to the Supreme Court. With the suicide of Reyes, the Supreme Court dismissed Reyes' petition.

The Supreme Court dismissed petition filed by the Alliance for Barangay Concerns (ABC) on their disqualification by the commission, on March 22. The commission's decision, in which ABC was disqualified for being a front of the Members Church of God International, a religious group that produces the Ang Dating Daan television program, was upheld as it stated that the constitution gave the commission the power to register and cancel the registration of party-list groups. The commission originally dismissed the petition filed by lawyer and journalist Melanio Mauricio, Jr. in 2010, but was reconsidered in August 2010; ABC has already won a seat in Congress but has not been sworn in. ABC, through its chairman James Marty Lim, argued that since the party had already won a seat, the jurisdiction should be under the House of Representatives Electoral Tribunal. However, the court ruled that commission maintains jurisdiction as the case does not refer to qualifications of members of Congress.
