= Floor leaders of the Senate of the Philippines =

Floor leaders of the Senate of the Philippines

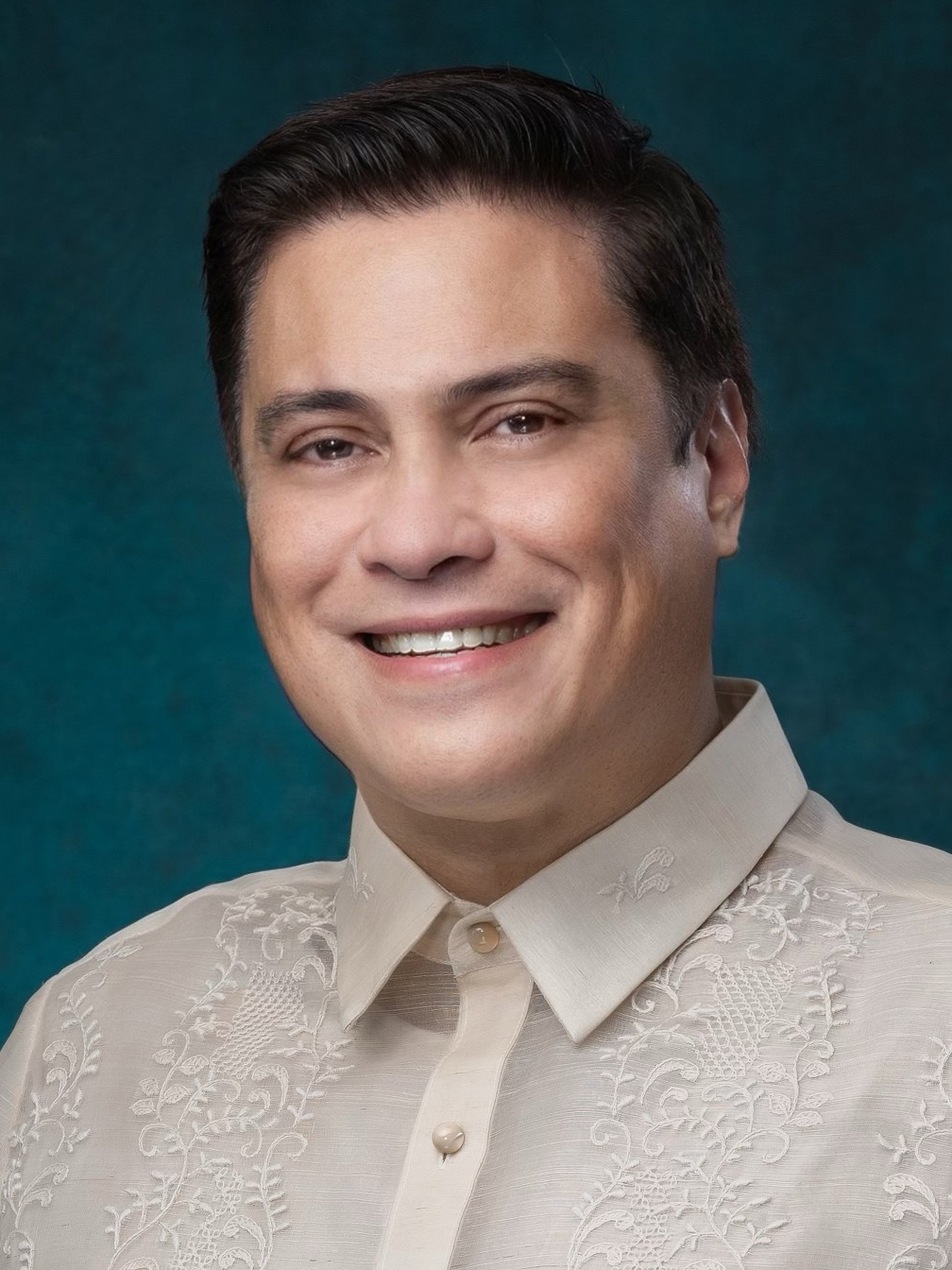
Majority Leader
Juan Miguel Zubiri (Independent)
(since June 3, 2026)

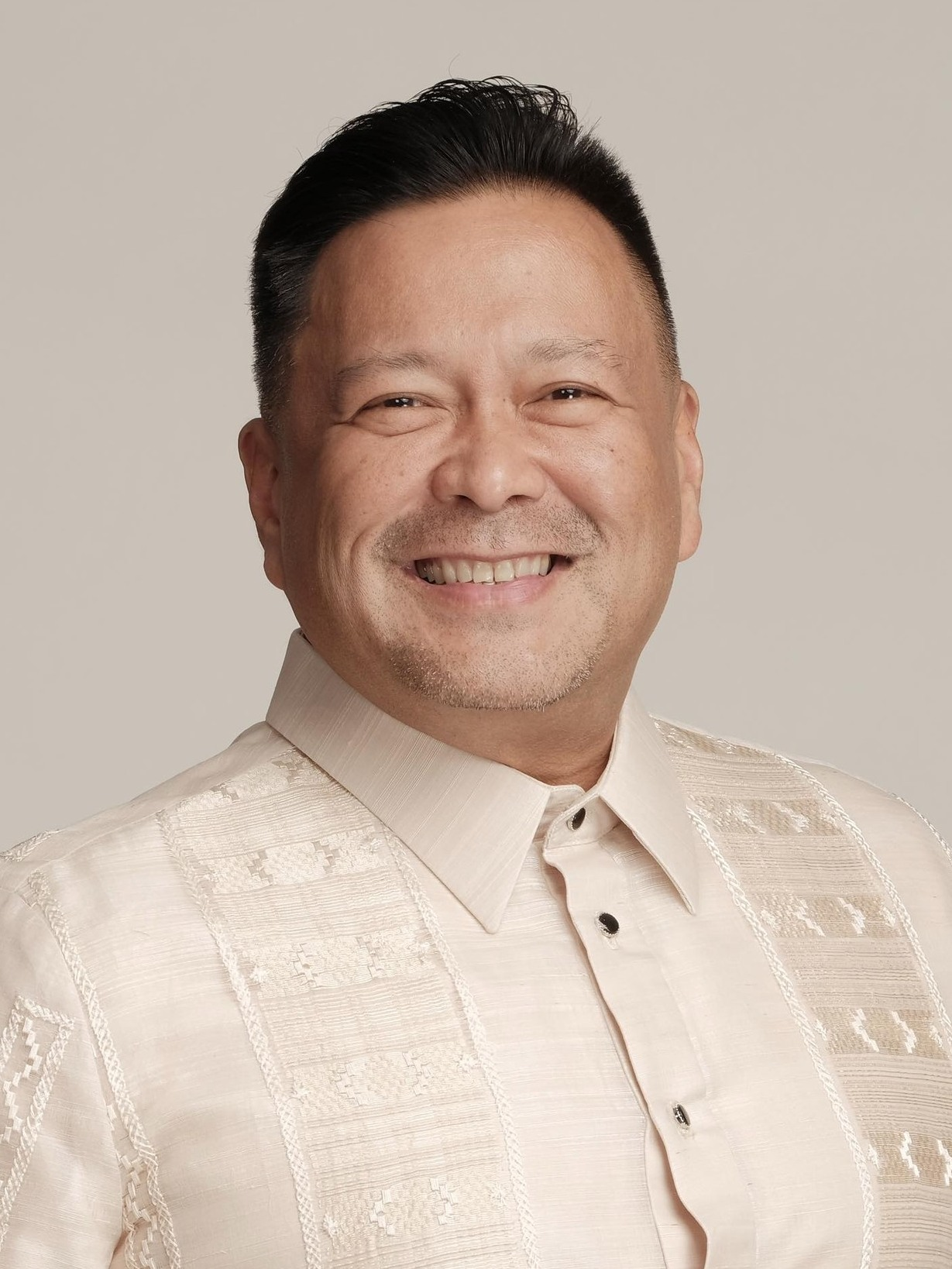
Senior Deputy Majority Leader
JV Ejercito (NPC)
(since June 17, 2026)

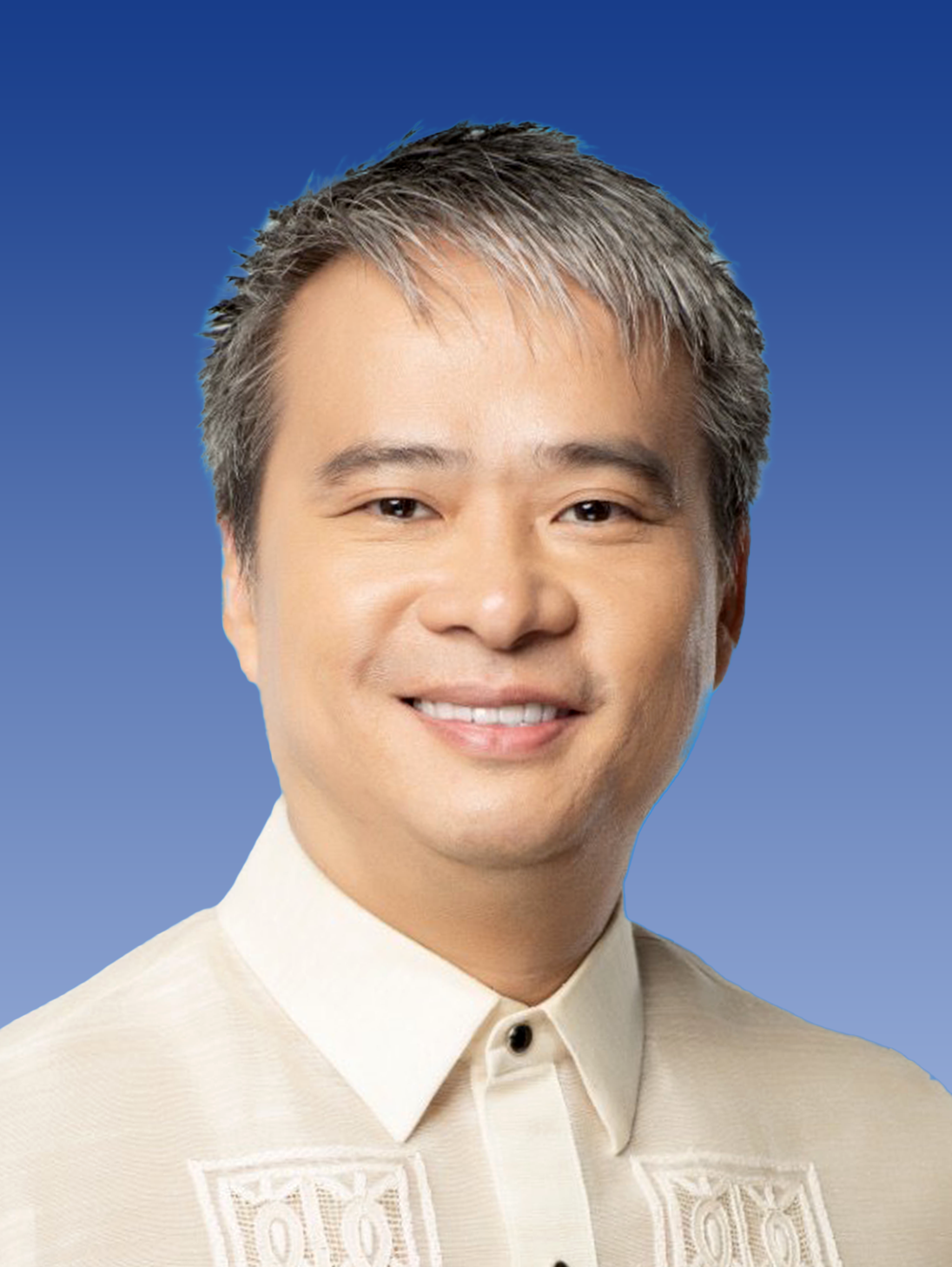
Deputy Majority Leader
Joel Villanueva (Independent)
(since June 17, 2026)

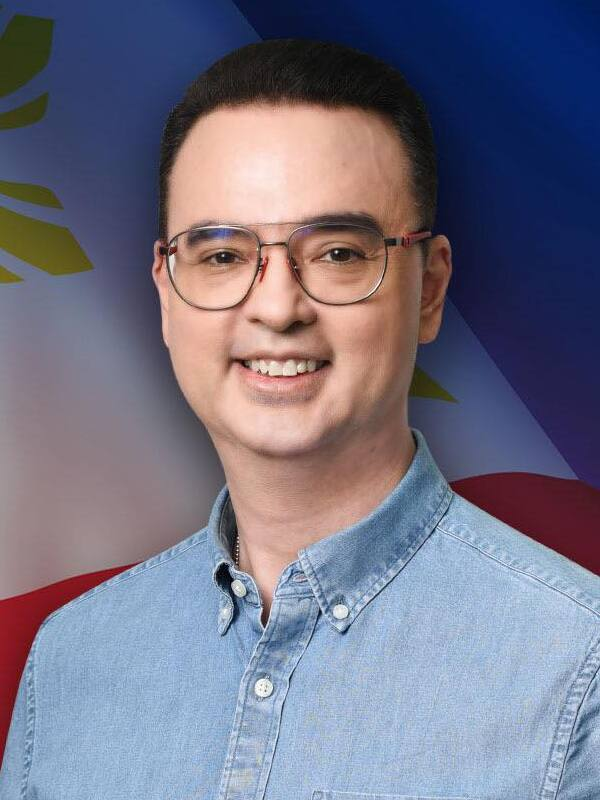
Minority Leader
Alan Peter Cayetano (Independent)
(since June 17, 2026)

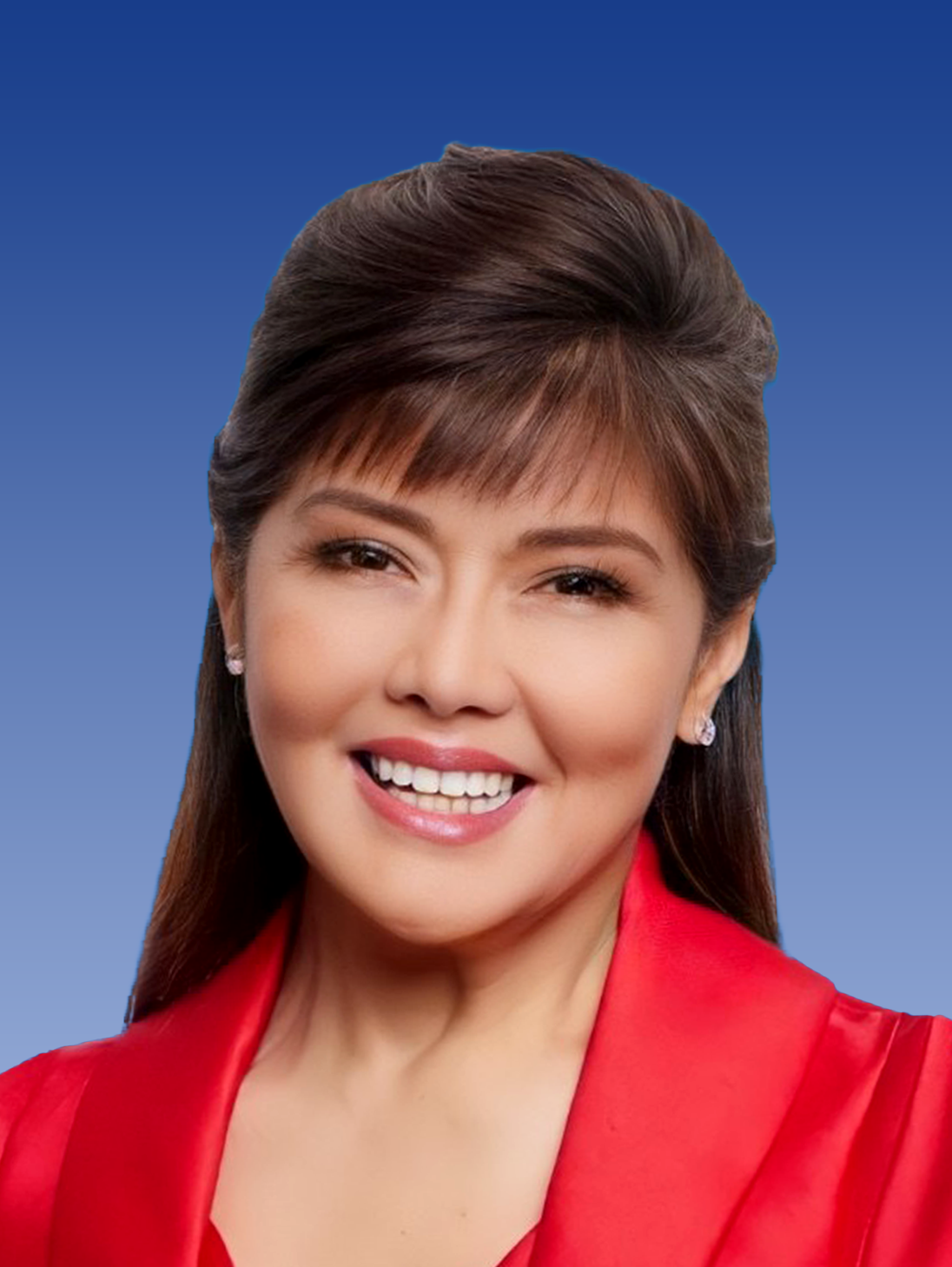
Deputy Minority Leader
Imee Marcos (Nacionalista)
(since July 29, 2026)

The majority and minority floor leaders of the Senate of the Philippines, also called Senate floor leaders, are positions held by two Philippine senators who are elected by their respective parties or coalitions as their official leaders. They serve as the chief spokespersons of their party with regard to their business in the Senate.

By tradition, senators who voted for the winning nominee for the Senate presidency in a two-way race belong to the majority, while those who voted otherwise compose the minority. The two “blocs” elect a leader from among themselves: a majority leader and a minority leader, who serve as the chief spokespersons of their party (or, in recent Congresses, internal alliances) in Senate affairs.

The second-ranking members of each bloc’s leadership are known as the deputy majority leader and deputy minority leader. The primary responsibility of the deputy leaders is to assist the majority and minority leaders, respectively, in their duties. During the absence of the floor leaders, the deputy leaders may serve as acting floor leaders. Posts for assistant majority leader, senior assistant minority leader, and assistant minority leader have existed in past Congresses.

The Senate during the 20th Congress provided for two deputy majority leaders and two deputy minority leaders serving concurrently.

== Current floor leaders ==
The current floor leaders are Juan Miguel Zubiri (Independent) for the majority and Alan Peter Cayetano (Independent) for the minority.

JV Ejercito (NPC) and Joel Villanueva (Independent) serve as deputy majority floor leaders, while Imee Marcos (Nacionalista) serves as deputy minority floor leader.

== History ==
The positions of majority leader and minority leader of the Senate of the Philippines are similar to the United States Senate's party leaders.

When the Philippines was a Commonwealth of the United States during the 1930s, it followed the American style of legislature. Then, upon the adoption of the 1935 Constitution, the Philippine government eventually patterned its bicameral Congress on the United States Congress.

On June 12, 1978, when the Interim Batasang Pambansa was inaugurated as mandated by the 1973 Constitution, the country shifted from a presidential to a parliamentary form of government and the two houses of Congress were abolished, including the positions of Senate majority and minority leaders.

On July 27, 1987, five months after the EDSA Revolution that toppled the Marcos administration, the Congress resumed its session 15 years after its abolition. All offices and positions of the Senate were restored upon the resumption of the 8th Congress.

The first majority leader of the Senate after its restoration was Orlando S. Mercado, while the first minority leader of the Senate was Juan Ponce Enrile.

On July 26, 2004, Francis Pangilinan was re-elected by the majority bloc to serve as the majority leader after he briefly served in the position during the 11th Congress, when Senator Loren Legarda left the majority and allied with the opposition to run for vice president against then Senator Noli De Castro in the 2004 national elections.

== Majority floor leader ==
In the modern Senate, the second in command is the majority leader. The primary responsibility of the majority leader is to manage the legislative affairs and business of the majority in the chamber. The majority leader is chosen by the majority party in the Senate to serve as its official leader in the body.

While nothing in the rules of the Senate expressly states the powers of the majority leader, the position holds significant influence in the passage of bills. As the traditional chairman of the Committee on Rules, the majority leader helps formulate, promote, negotiate, and defend the majority's legislative program, particularly on the floor. By tradition, the Senate president or any presiding officer gives the majority leader priority in obtaining the floor. The majority leader also helps develop the calendar of the Senate and assists the Senate president with program development, policy formation, and decisions.

The majority leader may also exercise party discipline, in consultation with other senior party leaders, with regard to voting on party policies and programs deemed to be crucial. A member who does not support the party's proposed measures may be demoted from committee assignments, leading to a reshuffle in some of the Senate committees.

== Minority floor leader ==
In the Philippine Senate, membership in the minority bloc does not always mean that a senator opposes the incumbent president or administration on every issue. A senator may join the minority because they did not support the election of the Senate president or chose to remain independent of the majority coalition.

The minority bloc examines, challenges, and seeks improvements to legislation and government actions before decisions are made. Its primary roles include reviewing and questioning proposed legislation and government policies, identifying potential problems or weaknesses in legislation, proposing amendments and alternative solutions, conducting oversight and investigations to help ensure government accountability, and representing viewpoints that differ from those of the Senate majority.

== List of floor leaders ==
Legislature	Dates	Majority leader		Majority bloc	Minority leader	
4th Legislature	October 16, 1916 – June 3, 1919	Francisco Felipe Villanueva	Nacionalista	Nacionalista majority	None	
5th Legislature	July 21, 1919 – June 6, 1922	Francisco Enage	Nacionalista	Nacionalista majority	None	
6th Legislature	October 27, 1922 – June 2, 1925	Francisco Enage	Nacionalista Colectivista	Nacionalista Colectivista majority	None	
7th Legislature	July 16, 1925 – June 5, 1928	Jose P. Laurel	Nacionalista	Nacionalista majority	None	
8th Legislature	July 16, 1928 – June 2, 1931	Jose P. Laurel	Nacionalista	Nacionalista majority	None	
9th Legislature	July 16, 1931 – June 5, 1934	Benigno Aquino Sr.	Nacionalista	Nacionalista majority	Claro M. Recto	Democrata
10th Legislature	July 16, 1934 – November 25, 1935	Claro M. Recto	Nacionalista Democratico	Nacionalista Democratico majority	None	
1st Commonwealth National Assembly	Legislature was unicameral.					
2nd Commonwealth National Assembly	Legislature was unicameral.					
Second Republic National Assembly	Legislature was unicameral.					
1st Commonwealth Congress	June 9 – December 20, 1945	Melecio Arranz	Nacionalista	Nacionalista majority	None	
2nd Commonwealth Congress	December 20, 1945 – May 25, 1946	Melecio Arranz	Nacionalista	Nacionalista majority	None	
2nd Commonwealth Congress	May 25 – August 5, 1946	Vicente Francisco	Liberal	Liberal plurality	Carlos P. Garcia	Nacionalista
1st Congress	August 5, 1946 – January 26, 1948	Vicente Francisco	Liberal	Liberal plurality	Carlos P. Garcia	Nacionalista
1st Congress	January 26, 1948 – February 21, 1949	Vicente Francisco	Liberal	Liberal majority	Carlos P. Garcia	Nacionalista
1st Congress	February 21 – December 30, 1949	Tomas Cabili	Liberal	Liberal majority	Carlos P. Garcia	Nacionalista
2nd Congress	December 30, 1949 – January 28, 1952	Tomas Cabili	Liberal	Liberal majority	Carlos P. Garcia	Nacionalista
2nd Congress	January 28 – April 17, 1952	Tomas Cabili	Liberal	Liberal plurality (Note: From the third to the fourth regular sessions of the 2nd Congress, the Liberal and Nacionalista parties each held 12 Senate seats. As both parties held the same number of Senate seats, the plurality shown follows the party of the elected Senate president: Quintín Paredes (Liberal), from March 5 to April 17, 1952; Camilo Osías (Nacionalista), from April 17 to 30, 1952; Eulogio Rodriguez (Nacionalista), from April 30, 1952 to April 17, 1953; Camilo Osías (Nacionalista), from April 17 to 30, 1953; Jose Zulueta (Liberal), from April 30 to May 20, 1953; Eulogio Rodriguez (Nacionalista), from May 20 to December 30, 1953)	Carlos P. Garcia	Nacionalista
2nd Congress	April 17, 1952 – April 30, 1953	Tomas Cabili	Liberal	Nacionalista plurality	Carlos P. Garcia	Nacionalista
2nd Congress	April 30 – May 20, 1953	Tomas Cabili	Liberal	Liberal plurality	Carlos P. Garcia	Nacionalista
2nd Congress	May 20 – December 30, 1953	Tomas Cabili	Liberal	Nacionalista plurality	Carlos P. Garcia	Nacionalista
3rd Congress	January 25, 1954 – January 23, 1956	Cipriano Primicias Sr.	Nacionalista	Nacionalista majority	Lorenzo Tañada	Citizens'
3rd Congress	January 23, 1956 – December 30, 1957	Cipriano Primicias Sr.	Nacionalista	Nacionalista majority	Lorenzo Tañada	Citizens'
4th Congress	January 27, 1958 – January 25, 1960	Cipriano Primicias Sr.	Nacionalista	Nacionalista majority	Ambrosio Padilla	Liberal
4th Congress	January 25, 1960 – December 30, 1961	Cipriano Primicias Sr.	Nacionalista	Nacionalista majority	Ferdinand Marcos	Liberal
5th Congress	January 22, 1962 – January 27, 1964	Arturo Tolentino	Nacionalista	Nacionalista majority	Estanislao Fernandez	Liberal
5th Congress	January 27, 1964 – December 30, 1965	Arturo Tolentino	Nacionalista	Liberal plurality	Estanislao Fernandez	Liberal
6th Congress	January 17, 1966 – January 26, 1967	Jose Roy	Nacionalista	Nacionalista plurality	Ambrosio Padilla	Liberal
6th Congress	January 26, 1967 – January 22, 1968	Rodolfo Ganzon	Nacionalista	Nacionalista plurality	Ambrosio Padilla	Liberal
6th Congress	January 22, 1968 – December 30, 1969	Rodolfo Ganzon	Nacionalista	Nacionalista majority	Ambrosio Padilla	Liberal
7th Congress	January 26, 1970 – January 24, 1972	Arturo Tolentino	Nacionalista	Nacionalista majority	Gerry Roxas	Liberal
7th Congress	January 24 – September 23, 1972	Arturo Tolentino	Nacionalista	Nacionalista majority	Gerry Roxas	Liberal
Interim Batasang Pambansa	June 12, 1978 – June 30, 1984	Legislature was unicameral.				
Regular Batasang Pambansa	June 30, 1984 – March 25, 1986	Legislature was unicameral.				
8th Congress	July 27 – August 17, 1987	Orly Mercado	Liberal	Liberal plurality	Joseph Estrada	Liberal
8th Congress	August 17, 1987 – July 23, 1990	Orly Mercado	Liberal	Liberal plurality	Juan Ponce Enrile	Nacionalista
8th Congress	July 23, 1990 – July 22, 1991	Teofisto Guingona Jr.	Liberal	Liberal plurality	Juan Ponce Enrile	Nacionalista
8th Congress	July 22, 1991 – January 18, 1992	Alberto Romulo	LDP	Liberal plurality	Juan Ponce Enrile	Nacionalista
8th Congress	January 18 – June 30, 1992	Alberto Romulo	LDP	LDP plurality	Wigberto Tañada	Liberal
9th Congress	July 27, 1992 – June 30, 1995	Alberto Romulo	LDP	LDP majority	Wigberto Tañada	Liberal
10th Congress	July 24 – August 28, 1995	Alberto Romulo	LDP	LDP majority	Ernesto Maceda	NPC
10th Congress	August 28, 1995 – October 10, 1996	Alberto Romulo	LDP	LDP plurality	Edgardo Angara	LDP
10th Congress	October 10, 1996 – January 26, 1998	Francisco Tatad	LDP	LDP plurality	Neptali Gonzales	LDP
10th Congress	October 10, 1996 – January 26, 1998	Francisco Tatad	Gabay Bayan	LDP plurality	Neptali Gonzales	LDP
10th Congress	January 26 – June 30, 1998	Franklin Drilon	Lakas	LDP plurality	Ernesto Maceda	NPC
10th Congress	January 26 – June 30, 1998	Franklin Drilon	LAMMP	LDP plurality	Ernesto Maceda	NPC
11th Congress	July 27, 1998 – April 12, 2000	Franklin Drilon	LAMMP	LAMMP plurality	Teofisto Guingona Jr.	Lakas
11th Congress	July 27, 1998 – April 12, 2000	Francisco Tatad	Gabay Bayan	Independent plurality	Teofisto Guingona Jr.	Lakas
11th Congress	April 12, 2000 – February 7, 2001	Francisco Tatad	Gabay Bayan	Independent plurality	Teofisto Guingona Jr.	Lakas
11th Congress	February 9 – June 30, 2001	Francisco Tatad	Gabay Bayan	Independent plurality	Rene Cayetano	Lakas
12th Congress	July 23, 2001 – June 3, 2002	Loren Legarda	Lakas	Lakas plurality	Nene Pimentel	PDP–Laban
12th Congress	June 3 – July 23, 2002	Nene Pimentel	PDP–Laban	Lakas plurality	Tito Sotto	LDP
12th Congress	July 23, 2002 – January 12, 2004	Loren Legarda	Lakas	Lakas plurality	Tito Sotto	LDP
12th Congress	January 12 – June 30, 2004	Kiko Pangilinan	Liberal	Lakas plurality	Tito Sotto	LDP
13th Congress	July 26, 2004 – June 30, 2007	Kiko Pangilinan	Liberal	Lakas plurality	Nene Pimentel	PDP–Laban
14th Congress	July 23, 2007 – November 17, 2008	Kiko Pangilinan	Liberal	Lakas plurality	Nene Pimentel	PDP–Laban
14th Congress	November 17, 2008 – June 30, 2010	Juan Miguel Zubiri	Lakas	Independent plurality	Nene Pimentel	PDP–Laban
15th Congress	July 26, 2010 – June 6, 2013	Tito Sotto	NPC	Liberal plurality	Alan Peter Cayetano	Nacionalista
15th Congress	June 6 – July 22, 2013	Gregorio Honasan (Acting)	UNA	Liberal plurality	Alan Peter Cayetano	Nacionalista
16th Congress	July 22, 2013 – July 28, 2014	Alan Peter Cayetano	Nacionalista	Nacionalista plurality	Juan Ponce Enrile	PMP
16th Congress	July 28, 2014 – August 24, 2015	Alan Peter Cayetano	Nacionalista	Nacionalista plurality	Tito Sotto (Acting)	NPC
16th Congress	August 24, 2015 – June 30, 2016	Alan Peter Cayetano	Nacionalista	Nacionalista plurality	Juan Ponce Enrile	PMP
17th Congress	July 25, 2016 – February 28, 2017	Tito Sotto	NPC	Independent plurality	Ralph Recto	Liberal
17th Congress	February 27–28, 2017	Tito Sotto	NPC	Independent plurality	Antonio Trillanes (Acting)	Nacionalista
17th Congress	February 28, 2017 – May 21, 2018	Tito Sotto	NPC	Independent plurality	Franklin Drilon	Liberal
17th Congress	May 21, 2018 – June 30, 2019	Juan Miguel Zubiri	Independent	NPC plurality	Franklin Drilon	Liberal
18th Congress	July 22, 2019 – June 30, 2022	Juan Miguel Zubiri	Independent	Nacionalista plurality	Franklin Drilon	Liberal
19th Congress	July 25, 2022 – May 20, 2024	Joel Villanueva	Independent	NPC plurality	Koko Pimentel	PDP–Laban
19th Congress	May 20, 2024 – June 30, 2025	Francis Tolentino	PDP	Nacionalista plurality	Koko Pimentel	PDP–Laban
19th Congress	May 20, 2024 – June 30, 2025	Francis Tolentino	PFP	Nacionalista plurality	Koko Pimentel	Nacionalista
20th Congress	July 28 – September 8, 2025	Joel Villanueva	Independent	Nacionalista–NPC– Independent plurality	Tito Sotto	NPC
20th Congress	September 8, 2025 – May 11, 2026	Juan Miguel Zubiri	Independent	NPC plurality	Alan Peter Cayetano	Independent
20th Congress	May 11 – June 3, 2026	Joel Villanueva (Acting)	Independent	Nacionalista plurality	Tito Sotto	NPC
20th Congress	June 3–17, 2026	Juan Miguel Zubiri	Independent	NPC plurality	Vacant	
20th Congress	June 17, 2026 – present	Juan Miguel Zubiri	Independent	NPC plurality	Alan Peter Cayetano	Independent

== List of deputy floor leaders ==
Legislature	Dates	Deputy majority leader				Deputy minority leader			
Legislature	Dates	Officeholder 1		Officeholder 2		Officeholder 1		Officeholder 2	
19th Congress	August 2, 2022 – May 20, 2024	JV Ejercito	NPC	Mark Villar	Nacionalista	Risa Hontiveros	Akbayan	None	
19th Congress	May 20 – July 23, 2024	Mark Villar	Nacionalista	None		Risa Hontiveros	Akbayan	None	
19th Congress	July 23, 2024 – June 30, 2025	JV Ejercito	NPC	None		Risa Hontiveros	Akbayan	None	
20th Congress	July 30, 2025 – September 8, 2025	JV Ejercito	NPC	Rodante Marcoleta	Independent	Juan Miguel Zubiri	Independent	Risa Hontiveros	Akbayan
20th Congress	September 9, 2025 – May 11, 2026	JV Ejercito	NPC	Risa Hontiveros	Akbayan	Rodante Marcoleta	Independent	Joel Villanueva	Independent
20th Congress	May 11 – June 17, 2026	Vacant				Vacant			
20th Congress	June 17 – July 29, 2026	JV Ejercito	NPC	Joel Villanueva	Independent	Vacant			
20th Congress	July 29, 2026 – present	JV Ejercito	NPC	Joel Villanueva	Independent	Imee Marcos	Nacionalista	None	

== See also ==
- Floor leaders of the House of Representatives of the Philippines

== Sources ==
- Officers of the Philippine Senate
- List of Senators
