= TGP Partylist =

Political party in the Philippines

TGP
- — Philippine partylist —
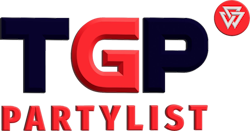
- Full name: Talino at Galing ng Pinoy
- Sector(s) represented: Multi-sector

Current representation (20th Congress)
- Seats in the House of Representatives: 1 / 3 (Out of 63 party-list seats)
- Representative(s): Jose Teves Jr.

Website
- www.tgppartylist.com

Talino at Galing ng Pinoy (lit. 'Intelligence and Excellence of the Filipino') or the TGP Partylist is an organization with party-list representation in the House of Representatives of the Philippines.

Election watchdog Kontra Daya tagged TGP on its list of party-list groups that do not serve marginalized groups and have links to political dynasties, big business, or the police or the military, or have corruption cases, since TGP's second nominee in 2025 is allegedly the president Teravera Corporation, which is allegedly a contractor for the Department of Public Works and Highways.

== History ==
Talino at Galing ng Pinoy first secured party-list representation in the House of Representatives through the 2019 elections.

TGP is associated with the Teves family from Catanduanes (distinct from the similar family from Negros island) with Bong Teves as the group's sole representative in the House of Representatives during the 19th Congress.

TGP will seek to at least retain its seat in the 2025 election.

== Political position ==
TGP aim to represent the youth and indigents and its platforms is focused on providing livelihood and health related programs.

== Electoral history ==
Election	Votes	%	Seats
2016	87,009	0.27	0 / 59
2019	217,525	0.78	1 / 61
2022	327,912	0.89	1 / 63
2025	407,922	0.97	1 / 63

== Representatives to Congress ==
Period	Representative
18th Congress; 2019–2022	Jose Teves Jr.
19th Congress; 2022–2025	Jose Teves Jr.
20th Congress; 2025–present	Jose Teves Jr.
Note: A party-list group, can win a maximum of three seats in the House of Representatives.
