= Bernadette Herrera =

Filipino politician

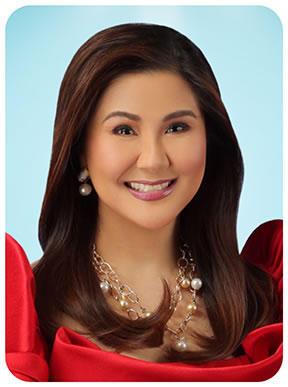
- Official portrait, 2022

Senior Deputy Minority Leader of the House of Representatives
- In office July 25, 2022 – June 30, 2025
- Leader: Marcelino Libanan
- In office December 7, 2020 – June 30, 2022

Member of the Philippine House of Representatives for the Bagong Henerasyon party-list
- In office June 30, 2016 – June 30, 2025
- In office June 30, 2010 – June 30, 2013

Member of Quezon City's 1st District City Council
- In office June 30, 2001 – June 30, 2010

Personal details
- Born: Bernadette Ramirez Herrera; February 22, 1976 (age 50) Quezon City, Philippines
- Party: BH Party List
- Other political affiliations: Lakas-CMD (before 2010)
- Spouse: Edgar Allan Dy (separated)
- Domestic partner: Roberto Nazal Jr.
- Children: 2
- Education: University of the Philippines Diliman
- Occupation: Politician

Bernadette Ramirez Herrera (born February 22, 1976) is a Filipina politician who served as Deputy Minority Leader Philippine House of Representatives and First Representative of the Bagong Henerasyon party-list. She is also a TV host at Serbisyong Bayanihan, a public service program under UNTV. She is known as an advocate for the rights of Solo Parents, being the co author of Republic Act No. 11861 or the Expanded Solo Parent Act.

== Early life and education ==
Bernadette Herrera was born on February 22, 1976. She attended the University of the Philippines Diliman, where she obtained a bachelor's degree in business economics and a master's degree in finance.

== Career ==
=== Quezon City councilor (2001–2010) ===
Herrera was first elected as councilor for the 1st district of Quezon City in 2001, when she was 26. She ran under the ticket of mayoral candidate Feliciano Belmonte Jr. She was re-elected twice, serving until 2010.

=== Bagong Henerasyon (2010–2013; 2016–2025) ===
Herrera is the founder of Bagong Henerasyon Foundation Inc. in 2001, which was accredited and authorized by the Commission on Elections to vow for party-list representation in the House of Representatives in 2009.

Bagong Henerasyon fielded Herrera as its first nominee in the 2010 elections, in which they secured a single seat for the 15th Congress. The party lost their seat in the 2013 elections (16th Congress).

The partylist would regain its seat in the 2016 elections, which was filled by Herrera In the 17th Congress, Herrara co-authored with Tom Villarin of Akbayan House Bill No. 4113, which eventually signed into law as Republic Act No. 11210 or the Expanded Maternity Leave Law in 2019.

During the 18th Congress, Herrera was named Deputy Speaker. She co-authored a bill banning child marriage in the Philippines which lapsed into law as Republic Act No. 11596, also known as the Prohibition of Child Marriage Law.

In the 19th Congress, she questioned the bidding process for the Department of Education procurement of laptops through the Department of Budget and Management's Procurement Service (PS-DBM)

Herrera has also advocated the legal recognition of same-sex union in the Philippines; she filed bills seeking the legalization of civil unions for same sex partners in the 18th and 19th Congress. She also is the principal author of the Republic Act No. 11861 or the Expanded Solo Parents Welfare Act.

In 2022, under the leadership of House of Representatives Speaker Martin Romualdez, Herrera was chosen as Senior Deputy Minority Leader at the House of Representatives.
