= Jose Teves Jr. =

Filipino politician

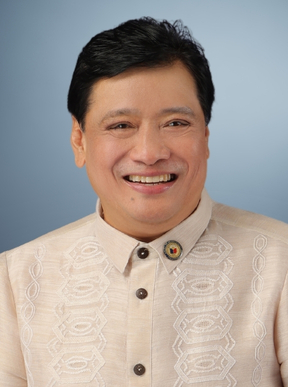
- Official portrait, 2025

Deputy Majority Leader of the House of Representatives of the Philippines
- Incumbent
- Assumed office July 29, 2025 Serving with several others
- Leader: Sandro Marcos

Representative of the TGP Partylist to the House of Representatives of the Philippines
- Incumbent
- Assumed office June 30, 2019
- Preceded by: Title Established

Vice Governor of Catanduanes
- In office June 30, 2010 – June 30, 2016
- Governor: Joseph Cua (2010–2013); Araceli Wong (2013–2016)
- Preceded by: Alfred Aquino
- Succeeded by: Shirley Abundo

Mayor of Baras, Catanduanes
- In office June 30, 2001 – June 30, 2010

Personal details
- Born: Jose Joson Teves Jr. Baras, Catanduanes, Philippines
- Citizenship: Philippines
- Party: TGP (partylist; 2018–present)
- Other political affiliations: NPC (2015–2018); Lakas (until 2015)

Jose Joson Teves Jr. is a Filipino politician. He is an incumbent representative of the TGP Partylist to the House of Representatives of the Philippines. He also is a former mayor of the municipality of Baras, a former Vice Governor, and a candidate for Catanduanes Governor.

== Political career ==
=== Mayor of Baras (2001-2010) ===
In the 2001 Philippine local elections, Teves was elected as the mayor of Baras, Catanduanes. In the 2004 Philippine local elections, Teves was, again, elected as the mayor of Baras. In the 2007 Philippine local elections, he was elected for a third term as the mayor of Baras. Since he was term-limited, he ran for another position.

=== Vice Governor of Catanduanes (2010-2016) ===
In the 2010 Philippine gubernatorial elections, Teves ran as the Vice Governor of Catanduanes. He successfully was elected as the Vice Governor of Catanduanes. In the 2013 Philippine gubernatorial elections, he ran for a second term for the Vice Governor of Catanduanes. He again was elected as the Vice Governor.

=== 2016 Catanduanes gubernatorial bid ===
In the 2016 Philippine gubernatorial elections, Teves ran for the governor of Catanduanes with the political party Nationalist People's Coalition. In February 2016, he signed a peace covenant at the town plaza of Virac, Catanduanes. On May 2, 2016, a bus carrying supporters of Teves crashed, killing two people. He supported Grace Poe for president. In the election, he gained last place, with 37,782 votes. Joseph Cua won the election.

=== Representative for TGP Partylist (2019-present) ===
==== 1st term ====
Teves was a nominee for the TGP Partylist in the 2019 Philippine House of Representatives elections. After the party list gained 215,652 votes or 0.78 percent of the votes, Teves filled a seat. During his tenure, he supported proper waste disposal.

==== 2nd term ====
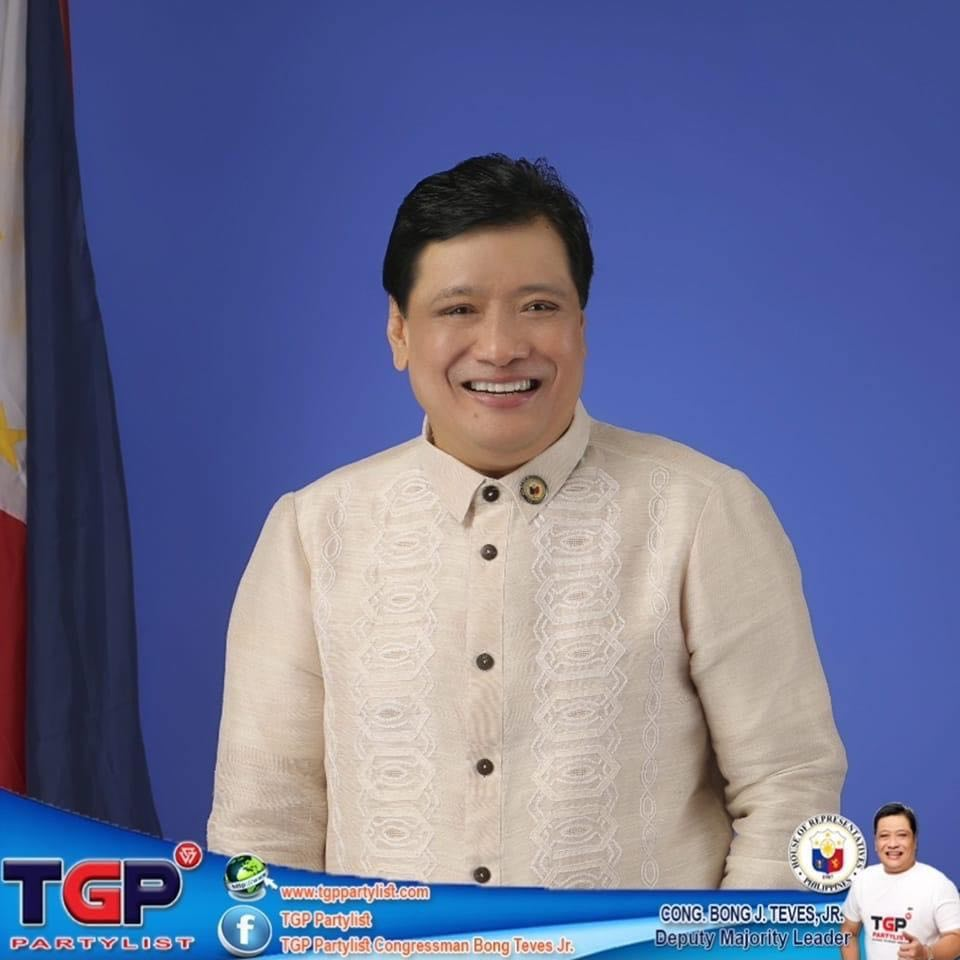
A portrait of Teves during his tenure as representative of TGP.

Teves was the first nominee of the TGP Partylist in the 2022 Philippine House of Representatives elections. After the party list gained 320,790 votes or 0.89 percent of the votes, they qualified for one seat, which was fulfilled by Teves. He principally authored 127 bills and co-authored 56 bills. He is a member for the majority of the Constitutional Amendments committee and the Youth and Sports Development committee. He is also a deputy majority leader for the Rules Committee.

During his tenure, he opposed the importation of papers to support local paper makers. He also opposed single-use plastics, filing a House of Representatives bill opposing it. He supported the opening of the Philippine Boxing Academy. On February 20, 2023, he supported to revise the 1987 Philippine Constitution.

==== Future terms ====
In the 2025 Philippine House of Representatives elections, the TGP Partylist filed their certificate of candidacy, with Teves as one of their candidates. The party list has three candidates for the election.

== Personal life ==
Teves's political family is based in the province of Catanduanes. His clan has no familial ties to the Teveses of Negros island. Jose Teves has to issue a clarificatory statement after Negros Oriental Governor Roel Degamo was assassinated in 2023. Negros Oriental representative Arnolfo Teves Jr. who is unrelated to Jose Teves' family was the alleged mastermind of that killing.
