= Bagong Henerasyon =

Party-list in the Philippines

- — Philippine partylist —
- Full name: BH Bagong Henerasyon
- Abbreviation: BH
- Chairperson: Bernadette Herrera
- Founded: 2001; 25 years ago
- Headquarters: Quezon City, Metro Manila
- Colors: Red, Yellow
- Slogan: Iangat ang Pamilya (transl. Uplift the Family); Tagapagtaguyod ng Serbisyo Publiko (transl. Advocate of Public Service)

Current representation (20th Congress)
- Seats in the House of Representatives: 1 / 3 (Out of 63 party-list seats)
- Representative(s): Roberto Nazal Jr.

The Bagong Henerasyon (lit. 'New Generation') Party-List, also known as BH Party List, is a political organization which has party-list representation in the House of Representatives of the Philippines.

The political party participated in the 2019 Philippine elections, where it secured one seat in the House of Representatives. The seat is currently held by Deputy Speaker Bernadette Herrera-Dy of Quezon City.

== Legislative agenda ==
The Bagong Henerasyon advocates public service in and out of Congress through livelihood programs. The following are notable accomplishments in its legislative agenda:

- RA 11466 - Salary Standardization Law of 2019 (HB 2027, 2028, and 2029)
- RA 11494 - Bayanihan to Recover As One Act
- RA 11509 - Medical Scholarship and Return Service Program (HB 4315)
- RA 11525 - COVID-19 Vaccination Program Act of 2021
- RA 11534 - Corporate Recovery and Tax Incentives for Enterprises (CREATE)

Advocacies includes gender equality and protection of women and children's rights, empowering the micro-small and medium enterprises (MSMEs), consumer protection, efficient internet, and economic recovery. Other measures authored are the 105-Day Expanded Maternity Leave Act and the bill banning child marriage in the country.

== Electoral performance ==
=== Seats ===
Election	Votes	%	Party-list seats
2010	293,079	0.97%	1 / 57
2013	190,001	0.69%	0 / 59
2016	299,381	0.92%	1 / 59
2019	288,752	1.04%	1 / 61
2022	330,937	0.90%	1 / 63
2025	315,937	0.77%	1 / 63

== Representation in Congress ==
Period	Representative
15th Congress; 2010–2013	Bernadette Herrera
16th Congress; 2013–2016	Out of Congress
17th Congress; 2016–2019	Bernadette Herrera
18th Congress; 2019–2022	Bernadette Herrera
19th Congress; 2022–2025	Bernadette Herrera
20th Congress; 2025–2028	Roberto Nazal Jr.
Note: A party-list group, can win a maximum of three seats in the House of Representatives.

BH won a single seat in the 2025 election, but the proclamation was put on hold by the COMELEC pending the resolution of a disqualification case. However the petition was dismissed on May 22, due to the complainant's failure to comply with the mandatory requirements in filing petitions. It was eventually proclaimed as the winner on June 6, 2025.
