= Party-list representation in the House of Representatives of the Philippines =

Feature of the democratic process in the Philippines

While most seats in the House of Representatives of the Philippines are elected by plurality vote in single-member districts, 20% of representatives are elected by party-list proportional representation. The 1987 Constitution of the Philippines created the party-list system. Originally, the party-list was open to underrepresented community sectors or groups, including labor, peasant, urban poor, indigenous cultural, women, youth, and other such sectors as may be defined by law (except the religious sector). However, a 2013 Supreme Court decision clarified that the party-list is a system of proportional representation open to various kinds of groups and parties, and not an exercise exclusive to marginalized sectors. National parties or organizations and regional parties or organizations do not need to organize along sectoral lines and do not need to represent any marginalized and underrepresented sector.

The determination of what parties are allowed to participate—who their nominees should be, how the winners should be determined, and the allocation of seats for the winning parties—has been controversial ever since the party-list election was first contested in 1998 and has resulted in several landmark COMELEC and Supreme Court cases.

Party-list representatives are indirectly elected via a party-list election wherein the voter votes for the party and not for the party's nominees (closed list); the votes are then arranged in descending order, with the parties that won at least 2% of the national vote given one seat, with additional seats determined by a formula dependent on the number of votes garnered by the party. No party wins more than three seats. If the number of sectoral representatives does not reach 20% of the total number of representatives in the House, parties that haven't won seats but garnered enough votes to place them among the top sectoral parties are given a seat each until the 63 seats are filled. A voter therefore has two parallel votes in House of Representatives elections—for district representative and for the under-represented sectoral-party list representative/s. Neither vote affects the other.

Party-list representation makes use of the tendency for proportional representation systems to favor single-issue parties, and applies that tendency to allow underrepresented sectors to represent themselves in the law-making process.

== Manner of election ==
=== Constitution ===
The Constitution mandates that the sectoral representatives shall compose 20% of the House of Representatives. For three consecutive terms after the ratification of the constitution, one-half of the seats allocated to party-list representatives were filled "by selection or election." For the 1987, 1992 and 1995 elections, the president appointed sectoral representatives, subject to the confirmation from the Commission on Appointments, half of whose members are derived from the House of Representatives.

=== Party-List System Act ===
Election	Method	Legislative districts	Sectoral representatives		Underhang
Election	Method	Legislative districts	20% quota	Seats won	Underhang
1998	R.A.7941	206	52	14	38
2001	VFP	205	51	14	37
2004	VFP	209	52	24	28
2007	VFP	218	54	22	32
2007	BANAT	218	54	53	1
2010	BANAT	229	57	56	1

On March 3, 1995, Republic Act No. 7941 or the Party-List System Act was signed into law by President Fidel V. Ramos. It mandated that "the state shall promote proportional representation in the election of representatives to the House of Representatives through a party-list system". The five political parties with the highest number of members at the start of the 10th Congress of the Philippines were banned from participating. Each voter can vote one party via closed list; votes are then tallied nationwide as one at-large district, with the number of sectoral representatives not to surpass 20% of the total number of representatives. The law provided that each party that has 2% of the national vote be entitled one seat each, and an additional seat for every 2% of the vote thereafter until a party has three seats. This means that a party can win the maximum three seats if it surpasses 6% of the national vote.

While the law was first used for the 1998 election, and several parties did meet the 2% quota during the succeeding elections, they did not fill up the required 20% allocation for party-list representatives of the constitution. Furthermore, the votes for parties that had more than 6% of the vote were considered wasted. Ateneo de Manila University mathematics professor Felix Muga II said that "Any seat allocation formula that imposes a seat-capping mechanism on the party-list proportional representation voting system contradicts the social justice provision of the 1987 Constitution."

Any vacancy is filled by the person next in line on the list; in cases where a seated sectoral representative switches parties, that representative loses their seat and the person next in line on the list assumes the seat.

=== Contestations ===
==== Veterans Federation Party et al. vs. COMELEC ====
Party-list results
2001:
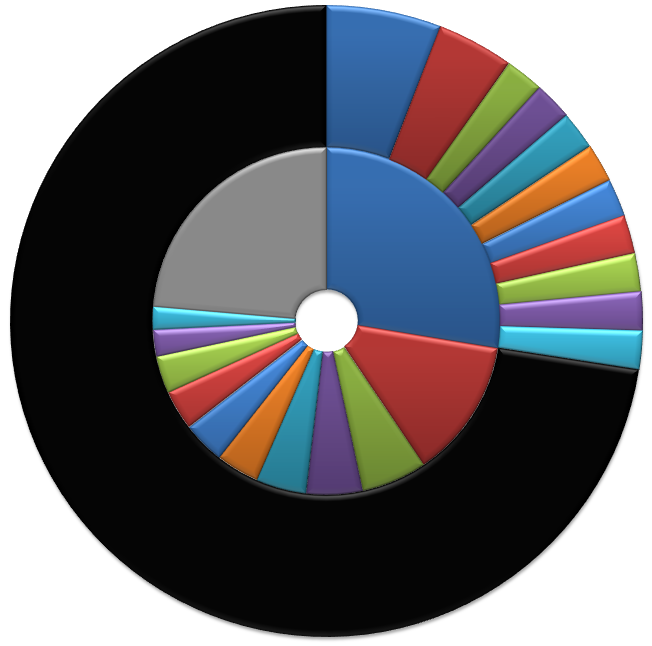
Note: Majority of the parties were disqualified after the election.
2004:
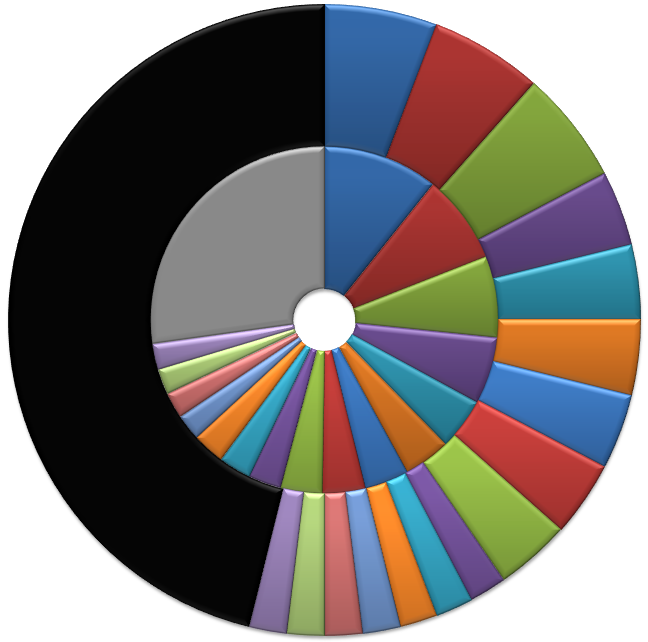
2007:
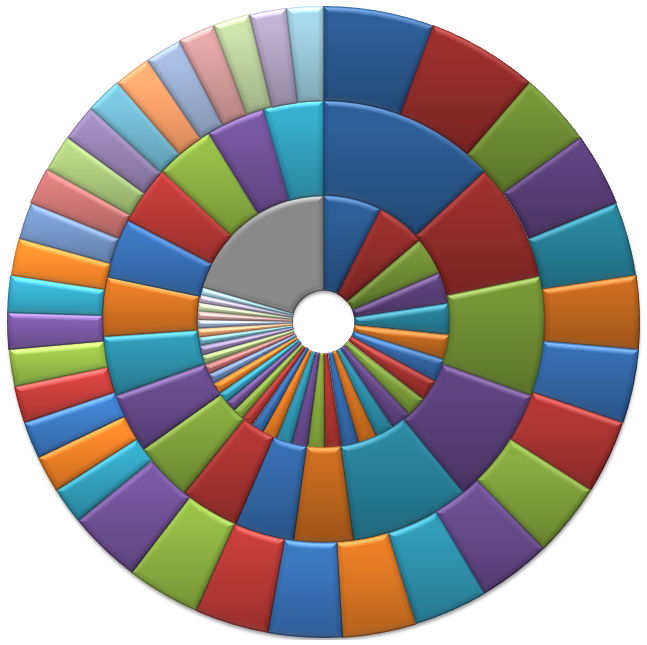
2010:
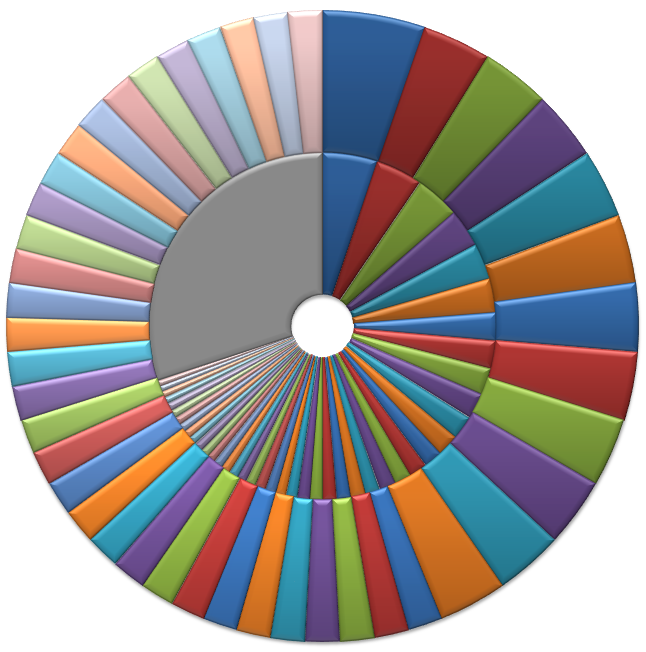
Key:
- Inner ring: Proportion of votes, excluding spoiled/invalid votes.
  - Gray: Parties that did not win seats.
- Middle ring (2007 only): Proportion of seats won as per VFP vs. COMELEC.
- Outer ring: Proportion of seats won (for 2007, this is the final allocation as per BANAT vs. COMELEC).
  - Black: Unfilled seats.

In 2000, the Veterans Federation Party (VFP), the Akbayan! Citizens' Action Party and several other parties sued the COMELEC, which led a case in the Supreme Court; the court ruling changed the way how the seats are allocated for the winning parties. In 1998, only 14 representatives were elected out of 13 winning parties, well short of the then 52 representatives needed to fill up 20% of the House. The so-called "Panganiban formula", named after Chief Justice Artemio Panganiban, calculates that the number of seats a party will win is dependent on the number of votes of the party with the highest number of votes.

The court maintained the four inviolable parameters:

First, the twenty percent allocation – the combined number of all party-list congress representatives shall not exceed twenty percent of the total membership of the House of Representatives, including those elected under the party list.

Second, the two percent threshold – only those parties garnering a minimum of two percent of the total valid votes cast for the party-list system are "qualified" to have a seat in the House of Representatives;

Third, the three-seat limit – each qualified party, regardless of the number of votes it actually obtained, is entitled to a maximum of three seats; that is, one "qualifying" and two additional seats.

Fourth, proportional representation – the additional seats which a qualified party is entitled to shall be computed "in proportion to their total number of votes".

The court came up with the following procedure on how to determine how many seats a party wins. First, the party with the highest number of votes gets at least one seat. It can win additional seats for every 2% of the national vote until it reaches the three-seat limit.

Therefore:

$TP_s = 1~ \mbox{if}~g\ >= 0.02$
$TP_s = 2~ \mbox{if}~g\ >= 0.04$

$TP_s = 3~ \mbox{if}~g\ >= 0.06$

where:

- TP_{s} is the number of seats of the top party.
- g is the percentage of votes garnered by the sectoral organization,

For the other parties surpassing the 2% threshold, they all automatically win one seat; additional seats will be won according to the following formula.

:$\mathrm{S} = (\frac{\mathrm{PV}}{\mathrm{TP}})\times{TP_s}$

where:

- S is the number of seats
- PV is the votes for the party
- TP is the votes of the top party.
- TP_{s} is the number of seats of the top party.

The product, disregarding integers, is the number of additional seats for the party.

Prior to the adopting the "Panganiban formula," the court considered applying the Niemayer formula used in the allocation of seats in the German Bundestag. However, since R.A. 7941 limits the maximum number of seats for each party to three, of the existence of a 2% quota, and that 20% of the seats can be filled up, the court instead devised the formula above to ensure that the 20% allocation for sectoral representatives would not be exceeded, the 2% threshold will be upheld, the three-seat limit enforced and the proportional representation be respected. The formula was first used in determining the result of the 2001, and was first applied in the 2004 elections.

The use of this formula by the COMELEC had been labeled by certain groups as to "annihilate independent voices in the House," according to Akbayan representative Etta Rosales. The court upheld this in subsequent cases, such as the Partido ng Manggagawa vs. COMELEC and Citizens' Battle Against Corruption vs. COMELEC.

Panganiban in 2010 remarked in a lecture at the Ateneo Law School that "It's very complicated and there must be an easier formula to compute," adding that the party-list law has to be amended by Congress.

==== BANAT vs. COMELEC ====
In 2007, another party-list group, the Barangay Association for National Advancement and Transparency (BANAT, now Barangay Natin!) sued the COMELEC for not proclaiming the full number of party-list representatives (they were not among on those who were proclaimed winners). As with the other cases, the Supreme Court condensed all the cases to one case. The court ruled on April 21, 2009, that the 2% election threshold unconstitutional, and stipulated that for every four legislative districts created, one seat for sectoral representatives should be created; this thereby increased the sectoral seats in the 14th Congress from 22 to 55; the Supreme Court, however, upheld the 3-seat cap.

To determine the number of seats for sectoral representatives, the formula for the quotient is:

$S = \left(\frac{D}{0.8}\right) \times 0.2$

where:

- S is the number of seats allocated for sectoral representation,
- D is the total number of district representatives, and
- D / 0.8 is the total number of members of the House.

To get the first guaranteed seat, a sectoral party or organization should at least get 2% of the total votes cast for partly list elections. The formula for the quotient is:

$g = \frac{P}{V}$

where:

- g is the percentage of votes garnered by the sectoral organization,
- P is the total number of votes gained by the sectoral organization, and
- V is the total number of votes cast in the party list representation election.

Therefore:
$R_1 = 1~ \mbox{if}~g\ >= 0.02$

If the total number of guaranteed seats awarded is less than the total number of seats reserved for sectoral representatives (S), the unassigned seats will awarded in the second round of seat allocation. To get the number of additional seats, this formula will be followed.

$R_2 =(S-T_1) \times g$

where:

- ${R_2}$ is the total number of additional seats awarded to the sectoral organization,
- S is the number of seats allocated for party-list representatives,
- ${T_1}$ is the total number awarded seats $({R_1})$ in the first round of seat allocation, and
- g is the percentage of votes garnered by the sectoral organization.

Note: ${R_2}$ should appear as whole integer.

If the total number of seats awarded after two rounds is still less than the total number of seats reserved for sectoral representatives (S), the remaining seats will be assigned to sectoral organizations next in rank (one seat each organization) whose ${R_2}$ result is 0 until all available seats are completely distributed.

$T_3 =(S-T_1-T_2)\$

where:

- ${T_3}$ is the total number of sectoral organizations next in rank (in Round 2) to be given with one seat,
- S is the number of seats allocated for party-list representatives,
- ${T_1}$ is the total number awarded seats in the first round of seat allocation, and
- ${T_2}$ is the total number awarded seats in the second round of seat allocation.

This is essentially a Hare quota, with the following exceptions:

- The 2% election threshold automatically awards parties one seat; this means that the total seats that will be disputed is the difference of the number of party-list seats and the number of parties that surpassed the threshold.
- The fractional remainder is disregarded. The seats that could've been distributed from the fractional remainders are given to parties that quotas less than 1 after the threshold.
- The party cannot win more than three seats. With the large number of parties contesting, this means the share of the votes the parties get are small—in 2010, the party with the most votes (Ako Bicol Political Party) won 5.20% of the vote—the only way a party's votes can be wasted is if its quota after the threshold is 4 or more. This can be affected if several parties surpassed the threshold (thus lessening the number of seats to be distributed), or if a party wins via a landslide. In 2010, AKB's quota after threshold was 2.33, or, disregarding decimals, 2. This entitled them to 2 additional seats aside from the automatic 1 seat they've won by surpassing the threshold.

Senator Joker Arroyo criticized the ruling of the Supreme Court, saying that the court "overreached itself and engaged in judicial legislation." Arroyo later compared with parties with between "155,000 to 197,000 votes... a measly 1 percent to 1.24 percent of the votes" to a city which needs a population of 250,000 or more to obtain its own legislative district.

==== Summary ====
Method	First seat	Second seat	Third seat
R.A. 7941	2% of vote	4% of vote	6% of vote
VFP vs. COMELEC	2% of the vote	Party with most votes: 4% of the vote	Party with most votes: 6% of the vote
VFP vs. COMELEC	2% of the vote	Other parties: Total votes divided by votes of the party with most votes; quotient will be multiplied by the number of seats the party with the most votes have. Product, disregarding decimals, is the number of seats.	
BANAT vs. COMELEC	2% of the vote	Hare quota, without decimals, from the seats that are not yet allocated.	
BANAT vs. COMELEC	If quota has not been met, parties with less than 2% of the preferences will get one seat until quota is met.	Hare quota, without decimals, from the seats that are not yet allocated.	

==== Example ====
In 2010, there are 57 party-list seats being contested, with 29,311,294 valid votes cast, and 12 parties having at least 2% of the vote.

Ako Bicol Political Party topped the vote, receiving 1,524,006 votes or 5.20% of the vote.

- First round:

$$R_1 = 1~ \mbox{since}~0.0519 \ >= 0.02$$

- Second round:

$$R_2 =(57-12) \times 0.0519$$
$$R_2 =45 \times 0.0519$$
$$R_2 =2.3397$$
Disregarding decimals, $R_2 =2$

- Both rounds:

$$S =1+2=3$$

- Hence, AKB won three seats in the House of Representatives.

Akbayan Citizens' Action Party received 1,061,947 votes or 3.62% of the vote.

- First round:

$$R_1 = 1~ \mbox{since}~0.0362\ >= 0.02$$

- Second round:

$$R_2 =(57-12) \times 0.0362$$
$$R_2 =45 \times 0.0362$$
$$R_2 =1.6303$$
Disregarding decimals, $R_2 =1$

- Both rounds:

$$S =1+1=2$$

- Hence, Akbayan won two seats in the House of Representatives.

Alagad received 227,281 or 0.78% of the vote.

- First round:

$$R_0 = 0~ \mbox{since}~0.0078 \ < 0.02$$

- Second round: At this point, 35 seats have already been awarded.

$$R_2 =(57-35) \times 0.0078$$
$$R_2 =22 \times 0.0078$$
$$R_2 =0.1706$$
Disregarding decimals, $R_2 =0$

- Both rounds:

$$S =0+0=0$$

- However, not all seats have been distributed. Therefore: Alagad won one seat in the House of Representatives.

A much simpler understanding of the formula is as follows:

- The topnotcher, and on rare occasions, the 2nd placed party, gets 3 seats.
- The other parties that got 2% or more of the valid votes gets 2 seats each
- The next 40 or so parties get 1 seat each

== Issues concerning party-list group nominees ==
=== Party-List System Act ===
The enabling law allows the following to be nominees:

No person shall be nominated as party-list representative unless he is a natural born citizen of the Philippines, a registered voter, a resident of the Philippines for a period of not less than one (1) year immediately preceding the day of the election, able to read and write, bona fide member of the party or organization which he seeks to represent for at least ninety (90) days preceding the day of the election, and is at least twenty-five (25) years of age on the day of the election. In case of a nominee of the youth sector, he must at least be twenty-five (25) but not more than thirty (30) years of age on the day of the election. Any youth sectoral representative who attains the age of thirty during his term shall be allowed to continue until the expiration of his term

— RA 7491

=== Major parties' involvement ===
While the party-list system has been used by some sectors that have not been able to participate in government in order to have a voice in Congress, allegations from left-leaning party-list organizations state that several parties were used as fronts by then-President Gloria Macapagal Arroyo's ruling administration to further its interests. Parties such as 1-UTAK, purportedly representing transport groups, and PACYAW, which claims to advocate athletes and sports personnel, have government officials for nominees. The first nominee of Ang Galing Pinoy, for instance, a group claiming to represent security guards and tricycle drivers, was former Pampanga 2nd district representative Mikey Arroyo, the son of the former president; Arroyo won a seat through Ang Galing Pinoy in the 2010 election.

In November 2025, representatives Antonio Tinio, Renee Co, Sarah Elago filed House Bill No. 6193, which aims to amend the party-list system law to serve marginalized sectors and disqualify candidates related to incumbent government officials, and disqualify candidates linked to government contractors.

=== Youth perceptions and campaign strategies ===
With the party-list system being dominated by political elites and dynasties with unclear platforms and intentions, voters, particularly the youth, are left with a limited understanding of its essence, which further hinders their political awareness. This disconnect between its true purpose and current reality, as being perceived differently through misinformation, highlights the need to prioritize voter education. Studies focusing on youth voters emphasize that visual design elements, particularly the use of recognizable and reputable political figures, can significantly influence perception of party-lists and voter participation. The findings suggest that the effectiveness of the system is not only determined by institutional rules, but also by engagement in the political sphere.

A 2025 eye-tracking experimental study at the Ateneo de Manila University examined how youth voters respond to party-list campaign posters. Fifty-two students were divided into two groups: one viewed a poster with Chel Diokno, while the other viewed a poster with the non-celebrity lookalike. Results showed that participants exposed to the recognizable figure showed significantly higher positive attitudes toward the party-list, including greater willingness to research, campaign, and vote for it. However, recognizability did not significantly affect visual attention patterns, which suggests that persuasion operates more through perceived credibility than through gaze duration. These highlight that while the system has been criticized for elite capture and weak representation of marginalized groups, candidate imagery and source credibility largely influences youth attitudes and participation. Moreover, it underscores the significance of marketing psychology and visual communication strategies to mobilize younger demographics who are often less politically-inclined or experienced.

=== Red-tagging during elections ===
Left-leaning parties in the Bagong Alyansang Makabayan (New Patriotic Alliance) bloc including Bayan Muna ,(Nation First), Kabataan Party-list (Youth Party-list), GABRIELA Women's Party, and Anakpawis, have been criticized in that the personalities in these parties were merely pursuing "ideological objectives" within Congress to support the outlawed Communist Party of the Philippines' objective of overthrowing the ruling system through "bloody means."

In January 2021, President Rodrigo Duterte urged leaders of the Congress to abolish the party list system, due to allegations that some parties, particularly the Makabayan bloc, were "sympathizers or connected" to the Communist Party of the Philippines and the New Peoples' Army (NPA).

In February 2025, the Philippine Commission on Elections (COMELEC) issued Resolution No. 11116, which made red-tagging and discrimination during election campaigns offenses punishable with imprisonment of one to six years and disqualification from public office. COMELEC Chair George Erwin Garcia said that the policy is based on the Philippine Supreme Court ruling that defined red-tagging as an act that threatens individuals.

In March 2025, during the campaign for the 2025 Philippine general election, Bayan Muna party-list nominee Neri Colmenares filed a complaint urging COMELEC to investigate allegations of red-tagging and vilification constituting "massive and widespread black propaganda" and the destruction of campaign materials. Vote Report PH noted reports of red-tagging, harassment, and disinformation prior to the elections, alongside vote buying and abuse of government resources in campaigns.

=== Ties with contractors ===
Some party-list representatives have close ties with construction companies that have contracts with the government. In 2026, these include Magbubukid Party-list Rep. Ferdinand Beltran, manager of Ferdstar Builders Contractors, and Pusong Pinoy Party-list Rep. Jernie Jett Nisay, general manager of JVN Construction and Trading.

=== Ang Bagong Bayani-OFW Labor Party vs. COMELEC ===
In 2002, the Supreme Court ruled in Ang Bagong Bayani-OFW Labor Party vs. COMELEC that nominees "must be Filipino citizens belonging to marginalized and unrepresented sectors, organizations and parties, as the constitution intended to give genuine power to the people, not only by giving more law to those who have less in life, but more so by enabling them to become veritable lawmakers themselves."

=== BANAT vs. COMELEC ===
In the same BANAT vs. COMELEC case stated above, while the ponencia thereof pointed out that neither the 1987 Constitution nor R.A. 7941 prohibits major political parties from participating in the party-list election, it was emphasized that they must do so by establishing or forming coalitions with sectoral organizations for electoral or political purposes. In fact, Associate Justice Antonio Carpio noted that "it is not necessary that the party-list organization's nominee 'wallow in poverty, destitution and infirmity' as there is no financial status required by the law." This effectively allowed anyone to be nominated by a party participating in the party-list election.

However, by a vote of 8–7, the Supreme Court still decided to continue disallowing major political parties from participating in the party-list elections, directly or indirectly.

== Qualification to the ballot ==
In Bagong Bayani-OFW Labor Party vs. COMELEC, the Supreme Court laid down the requirements in which groups can qualify to the ballot:

1. Political party, sector, organization or coalition must represent the marginalized and underrepresented groups
2. Political party must show, however, that they represent the interests of the marginalized and underrepresented
3. Religious sector may not be represented in the party-list system
4. The party or organization must not be an adjunct of, or a project organized or an entity funded or assisted by, the government
5. The party must not only comply with the requirements of the law; its nominees must likewise do so
6. Not only the candidate party or organization must represent marginalized and underrepresented sectors; so also must its nominees
7. The nominee must likewise be able to contribute to the formulation and enactment of appropriate legislation that will benefit the nation as a whole

In Atong Paglaum vs. COMELEC, the Supreme Court ruled that the party-list system is not for sectoral parties only, but also for non-sectoral parties. The Supreme Court then laid down the basic on which organizations can join:

1. Three different groups may participate in the party-list system:
  1. national parties or organizations,
  2. regional parties or organizations, and
  3. sectoral parties or organizations
2. National parties or organizations and regional parties or organizations do not need to organize along sectoral lines and do not need to represent any "marginalized and underrepresented" sector.
3. Political parties can participate in party-list elections provided they register under the party-list system and do not field candidates in legislative district elections. A political party, whether major or not, that fields candidates in legislative district elections can participate in party-list elections only through its sectoral wing that can separately register under the party-list system. The sectoral wing is by itself an independent sectoral party, and is linked to a political party through a coalition.
4. Sectoral parties or organizations may either be "marginalized and underrepresented" or lacking in "well-defined political constituencies."
5. A majority of the members of sectoral parties or organizations that represent the "marginalized and underrepresented" must belong to the "marginalized and underrepresented" sector they represent. Similarly, a majority of the members of sectoral parties or organizations that lack "well-defined political constituencies" must belong to the sector they represent. The nominees of sectoral parties or organizations that represent the "marginalized and underrepresented," or that represent those who lack "well-defined political constituencies," either must belong to their respective sectors, or must have a track record of advocacy for their respective sectors. The nominees of national and regional parties or organizations must be bona-fide members of such parties or organizations.
6. National, regional, and sectoral parties or organizations shall not be disqualified if some of their nominees are disqualified, provided that they have at least one nominee who remains qualified.

== Results ==
Year	Seats		Parties			Topnotcher				Turnout			
Year	Up	Underhang	Participants	Winners	% losing parties' vote	Party	Votes	% of valid votes	Seats won	Valid votes	% of total	Total	% of voters
1998	51	37	123	14	63%	APEC	503,487	5.50%	2	9,155,309	31.26%	29,285,775	69%
2001	51	37	162	14	36%	Bayan Muna	1,708,253	11.30%	3	15,118,815	51.29%	29,474,309	51%
2004	52	24	66	28	35%	Bayan Muna	1,203,305	9.46%	3	13,241,974	39.52%	33,510,092	40%
2007	54	1	93	53	33%	Buhay	1,169,338	7.30%	3	15,950,900	48.63%	32,800,054	49%
2010	57	0	178	57	30%	Ako Bikol	1,524,006	5.20%	3	30,092,613	78.88%	38,149,371	74%
2013	58	2	112	56	25%	Buhay	1,270,608	4.60%	3	28,600,124	71.24%	40,144,207	76%
2016	59	0	115	59	22%	Ako Bikol	1,664,975	5.14%	3	32,377,841	71.98%	44,980,362	81%
2019	61	0	134	61	23%	ACT-CIS	2,651,987	9.51%	3	27,884,790	58.96%	47,296,442	74%
2022	63	0	177	55	29.57%	ACT-CIS	2,111,091	5.74%	3	36,802,064	65.61%	56,095,234	83%
2025	63	0	162	52	27.39%	Akbayan	2,779,621	6.63%	3	41,950,339	73.15%	57,350,958	82%

== See also ==
Methods of determining winners in party-list proportional representation:

- Highest averages method
  - D'Hondt method
  - Sainte-Laguë method
- Largest remainder method
  - Hare quota
  - Droop quota
  - Imperiali quota
