= 2025 Philippine House of Representatives elections in Calabarzon =

- May 12, 2025
- All 31 Calabarzon seats in the House of Representatives
| Party | Seats | +/– |
|---|---|---|
| Lakas | 10 | +7 |
| NPC | 9 | +2 |
| NUP | 7 | −1 |
| Nacionalista | 3 | −2 |
| PFP | 1 | +1 |
| Independent | 1 | +1 |
This lists parties that won seats. See the complete results below.

The 2025 Philippine House of Representatives elections in Calabarzon were held on May 12, 2025, as part of the 2025 Philippine general election.

== Summary ==
| Congressional district | Incumbent | Incumbent's party | Winner | Winner's party | Winning margin |
|---|---|---|---|---|---|
| Antipolo–1st | Roberto Puno | NUP | Ronaldo Puno | NUP | 80.66% |
| Antipolo–2nd | Romeo Acop | NUP | Romeo Acop | NUP | Unopposed |
| Batangas–1st | Eric Buhain | Nacionalista | Leandro Leviste | Independent | 49.16% |
| Batangas–2nd | Gerville Luistro | Lakas | Gerville Luistro | Lakas | 24.36% |
| Batangas–3rd | Maria Theresa Collantes | NPC | King Collantes | NPC | 25.27% |
| Batangas–4th | Lianda Bolilia | Nacionalista | Caloy Bolilia | Nacionalista | 5.93% |
| Batangas–5th | Marvey Mariño | Nacionalista | Beverley Dimacuha | Nacionalista | 74.60% |
| Batangas–6th | Vacant | | Ryan Recto | Nacionalista | 9.83% |
| Biñan | Len Alonte | Lakas | Arman Dimaguila | Lakas | 25.24% |
| Calamba | Cha Hernandez | Lakas | Cha Hernandez | Lakas | 50.96% |
| Cavite–1st | Jolo Revilla | Lakas | Jolo Revilla | Lakas | 55.86% |
| Cavite–2nd | Lani Mercado | Lakas | Lani Mercado | Lakas | Unopposed |
| Cavite–3rd | AJ Advincula | NUP | AJ Advincula | NUP | 10.37% |
| Cavite–4th | Vacant | | Kiko Barzaga | NUP | 4.74% |
| Cavite–5th | Roy Loyola | NPC | Roy Loyola | NPC | 22.00% |
| Cavite–6th | Antonio Ferrer | NUP | Antonio Ferrer | NUP | Unopposed |
| Cavite–7th | Crispin Diego Remulla | NUP | Crispin Diego Remulla | NUP | 69.20% |
| Cavite–8th | Aniela Tolentino | NUP | Aniela Tolentino | NUP | 55.80% |
| Laguna–1st | Ann Matibag | Lakas | Ann Matibag | Lakas | Unopposed |
| Laguna–2nd | Ruth Hernandez | Lakas | Ramil Hernandez | Lakas | 2.32% |
| Laguna–3rd | Loreto Amante | Lakas | Loreto Amante | Lakas | 75.96% |
| Laguna–4th | Jam Agarao | PFP | Benjamin Agarao Jr. | PFP | 0.12% |
| Quezon–1st | Mark Enverga | NPC | Mark Enverga | NPC | Unopposed |
| Quezon–2nd | David Suarez | Lakas | David Suarez | Lakas | Unopposed |
| Quezon–3rd | Reynante Arrogancia | NPC | Reynante Arrogancia | NPC | 39.10% |
| Quezon–4th | Keith Micah Tan | NPC | Keith Micah Tan | NPC | Unopposed |
| Rizal–1st | Jack Duavit | NPC | Mia Ynares | NPC | 50.95% |
| Rizal–2nd | Dino Tanjuatco | NPC | Dino Tanjuatco | NPC | 71.90% |
| Rizal–3rd | Jojo Garcia | NPC | Jojo Garcia | NPC | 32.68% |
| Rizal–4th | Fidel Nograles | Lakas | Dennis Hernandez | NPC | 4.56% |
| Santa Rosa | Dan Fernandez | NUP | Roy Gonzales | Lakas | 14.74% |

== Batangas ==
=== 1st district ===
2025 Batangas's 1st congressional district election
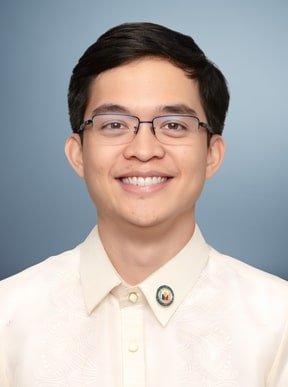

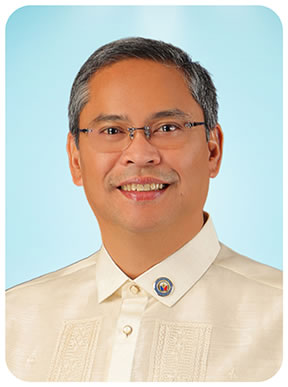
| Candidate | Leandro Leviste | Eric Buhain |
| Party | Independent | Nacionalista |
| Popular vote | 268,764 | 91,588 |
| Percentage | 74.58% | 25.42% |
House representative before election
Eric Buhain
Nacionalista
Elected House representative
Leandro Leviste
Independent

Incumbent Eric Buhain of the Nacionalista Party ran for a second term.

Buhain was defeated by Senator Loren Legarda's son, Leandro Leviste, an independent.

| Candidate | Party | Votes | % |
|---|---|---|---|
| Leandro Leviste | Independent | 268,764 | 74.58 |
| Eric Buhain (incumbent) | Nacionalista Party | 91,588 | 25.42 |
| Total | | 360,352 | 100.00 |
| Valid votes | | 360,352 | 97.22 |
| Invalid/blank votes | | 10,315 | 2.78 |
| Total votes | | 370,667 | 100.00 |
| Registered voters/turnout | | 419,735 | 88.31 |
| Independent gain from Nacionalista | | | |
Source: Commission on Elections

=== 2nd district ===
2025 Batangas's 2nd congressional district election
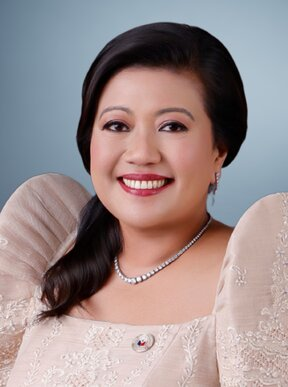

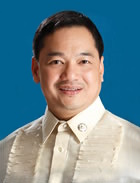
| Candidate | Gerville Luistro | Raneo Abu |
| Party | Lakas | Nacionalista |
| popular vote | 109,478 | 66,583 |
| Percentage | 62.18% | 37.82% |
House representative before election
Gerville Luistro
Lakas
Elected House representative
Gerville Luistro
Lakas

Incumbent Gerville Luistro of Lakas–CMD ran for a second term. She was previously affiliated with the Nationalist People's Coalition.

Luistro won re-election against former representative Raneo Abu (Nacionalista Party).

| Candidate | Party | Votes | % |
|---|---|---|---|
| Gerville Luistro (incumbent) | Lakas–CMD | 109,478 | 62.18 |
| Raneo Abu | Nacionalista Party | 66,583 | 37.82 |
| Total | | 176,061 | 100.00 |
| Valid votes | | 176,061 | 97.82 |
| Invalid/blank votes | | 3,929 | 2.18 |
| Total votes | | 179,990 | 100.00 |
| Registered voters/turnout | | 208,306 | 86.41 |
| Lakas hold | | | |
Source: Commission on Elections

=== 3rd district ===
2025 Batangas 3rd congressional district election
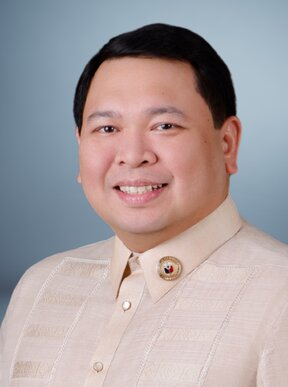

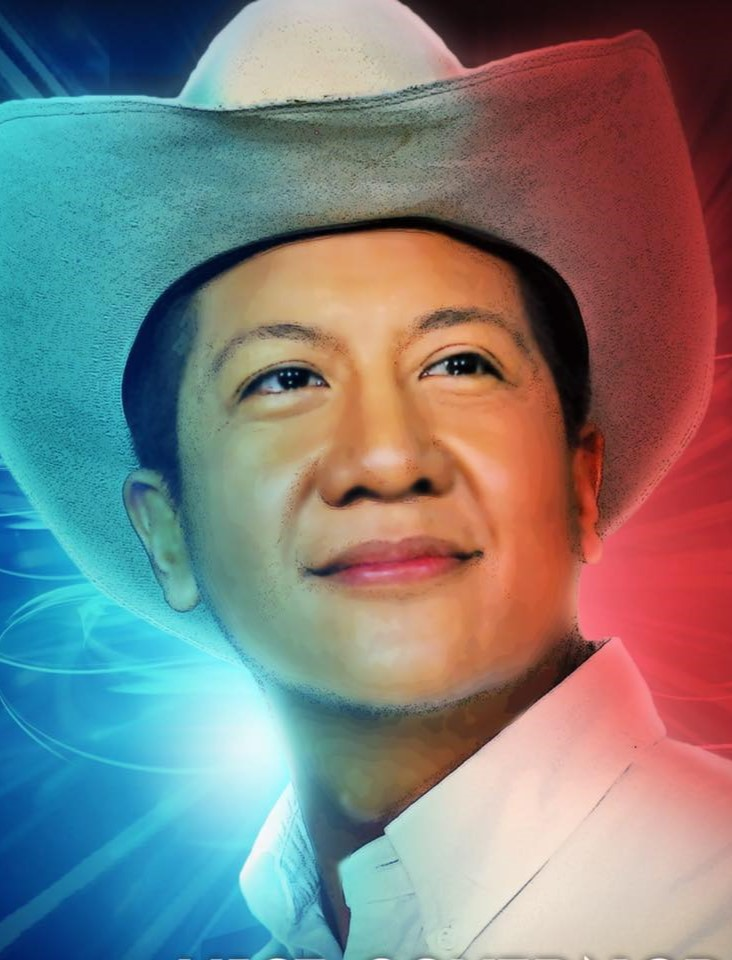
| Candidate | King Collantes | Mark Leviste |
| Party | NPC | Independent |
| popular vote | 244,340 | 143,751 |
| Percentage | 61.39% | 36.12% |
House representative before election
Maria Theresa Collantes
NPC
Elected House representative
King Collantes
NPC

Incumbent Maria Theresa Collantes of the Nationalist People's Coalition (NPC) was term-limited.

The NPC nominated Collantes' son, King Collantes, who won the election against Batangas vice governor Mark Leviste (Independent) and Nestor Burgos (Independent).

| Candidate | Party | Votes | % |
|---|---|---|---|
| King Collantes | Nationalist People's Coalition | 244,340 | 61.39 |
| Mark Leviste | Independent | 143,751 | 36.12 |
| Nestor Burgos | Independent | 9,932 | 2.50 |
| Total | | 398,023 | 100.00 |
| Valid votes | | 398,023 | 89.34 |
| Invalid/blank votes | | 47,482 | 10.66 |
| Total votes | | 445,505 | 100.00 |
| Registered voters/turnout | | 515,378 | 86.44 |
| NPC hold | | | |
Source: Commission on Elections

=== 4th district ===
2025 Batangas 4th congressional district election
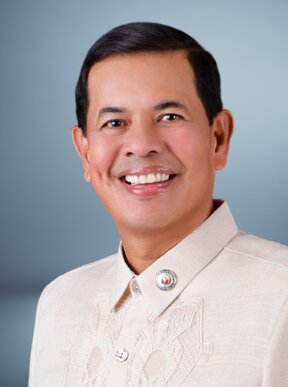
| | | IND |
| Candidate | Caloy Bolilia | JP Gozos |
| Party | Nacionalista | Independent |
| popular vote | 142,884 | 126,636 |
| Percentage | 52.14% | 46.21% |
House representative before election
Lianda Bolilia
Nacionalista
Elected House representative
Caloy Bolilia
Nacionalista

Incumbent Lianda Bolilia of the Nacionalista Party was term-limited.

The Nacionalista Party nominated Bolilia's husband, former provincial board member Caloy Bolilia, who won the election against provincial board member JP Gozos (Independent) and Ronald Umali (Lakas–CMD).

| Candidate | Party | Votes | % |
|---|---|---|---|
| Caloy Bolilia | Nacionalista Party | 142,884 | 52.14 |
| JP Gozos | Independent | 126,636 | 46.21 |
| Ronald Umali | Lakas–CMD | 4,527 | 1.65 |
| Total | | 274,047 | 100.00 |
| Valid votes | | 274,047 | 94.64 |
| Invalid/blank votes | | 15,514 | 5.36 |
| Total votes | | 289,561 | 100.00 |
| Registered voters/turnout | | 329,711 | 87.82 |
| Nacionalista hold | | | |
Source: Commission on Elections

=== 5th district ===
2025 Batangas 5th congressional district election
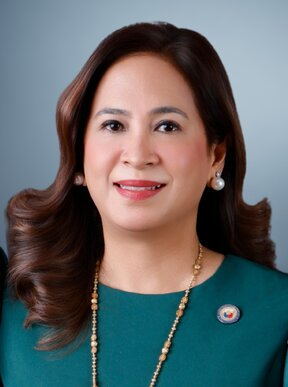
| | | MKBYN |
| Candidate | Beverley Dimacuha | Carlito Bisa |
| Party | Nacionalista | Makabayan |
| popular vote | 156,049 | 22,698 |
| Percentage | 87.30% | 12.70% |
House representative before election
Marvey Mariño
Nacionalista
Elected House representative
Beverley Dimacuha
Nacionalista

Term-limited incumbent Marvey Mariño of the Nacionalista Party ran for mayor of Batangas City.

The Nacionalista Party nominated Mariño's wife, Batangas City mayor Beverley Dimacuha, who won the election against Carlito Bisa (Makabayan).

| Candidate | Party | Votes | % |
|---|---|---|---|
| Beverley Dimacuha | Nacionalista Party | 156,049 | 87.30 |
| Carlito Bisa | Makabayan | 22,698 | 12.70 |
| Total | | 178,747 | 100.00 |
| Valid votes | | 178,747 | 92.74 |
| Invalid/blank votes | | 14,003 | 7.26 |
| Total votes | | 192,750 | 100.00 |
| Registered voters/turnout | | 228,263 | 84.44 |
| Nacionalista hold | | | |
Source: Commission on Elections

=== 6th district ===
2025 Batangas 6th congressional district election
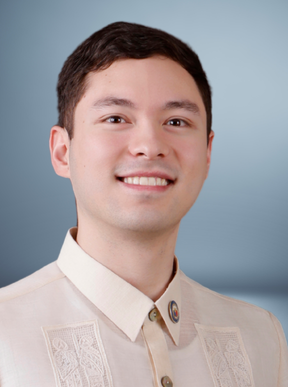
| | | IND |
| Candidate | Ryan Recto | Bernadette Sabili |
| Party | Nacionalista | Independent |
| Popular vote | 92,823 | 72,976 |
| Percentage | 45.94% | 36.11% |
House representative before election
Ralph Recto
Nacionalista
Elected House representative
Ryan Recto
Nacionalista

The seat is vacant after Ralph Recto of the Nacionalista Party resigned on January 12, 2024, upon his appointment as Secretary of Finance.

The Nacionalista Party nominated Recto's son, Ryan Recto, who won the election against three other candidates.

| Candidate | Party | Votes | % |
|---|---|---|---|
| Ryan Recto | Nacionalista Party | 92,823 | 45.94 |
| Bernadette Sabili | Independent | 72,976 | 36.11 |
| Mar Panganiban | Independent | 20,872 | 10.33 |
| Rodel Lacorte | Independent | 15,398 | 7.62 |
| Total | | 202,069 | 100.00 |
| Valid votes | | 202,069 | 92.19 |
| Invalid/blank votes | | 17,130 | 7.81 |
| Total votes | | 219,199 | 100.00 |
| Registered voters/turnout | | 257,401 | 85.16 |
| Nacionalista hold | | | |
Source: Commission on Elections

== Cavite ==
=== 1st district ===
2025 Cavite's 1st congressional district election
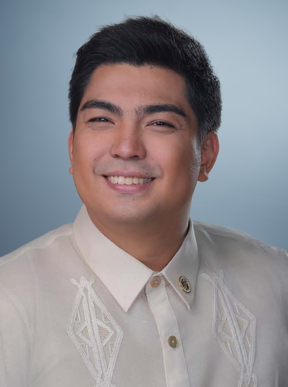
| | | LP |
| Candidate | Jolo Revilla | Paul Abaya |
| Party | Lakas | Liberal |
| popular vote | 147,263 | 41,710 |
| Percentage | 77.93% | 22.07% |
House representative before election
Jolo Revilla
Lakas
Elected House representative
Jolo Revilla
Lakas

Incumbent Jolo Revilla of Lakas–CMD ran for a second term.

Revilla won re-election against former Kawit vice mayor Paul Abaya (Liberal Party).

| Candidate | Party | Votes | % |
|---|---|---|---|
| Jolo Revilla (incumbent) | Lakas–CMD | 147,263 | 77.93 |
| Paul Abaya | Liberal Party | 41,710 | 22.07 |
| Total | | 188,973 | 100.00 |
| Valid votes | | 188,973 | 95.14 |
| Invalid/blank votes | | 9,644 | 4.86 |
| Total votes | | 198,617 | 100.00 |
| Registered voters/turnout | | 261,336 | 76.00 |
| Lakas hold | | | |
Source: Commission on Elections

=== 2nd district ===
2025 Cavite's 2nd congressional district election
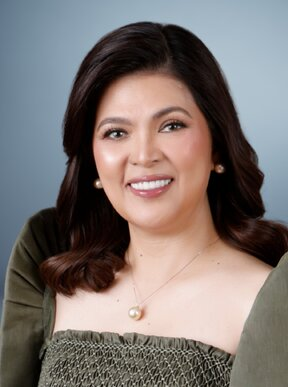
| Candidate | Lani Mercado |
| Party | Lakas |
| popular vote | 172,694 |
| Percentage | 100.00% |
House representative before election
Lani Mercado
Lakas
Elected House representative
Lani Mercado
Lakas

Incumbent Lani Mercado of Lakas–CMD won re-election for a second term unopposed.

| Candidate | Party | Votes | % |
|---|---|---|---|
| Lani Mercado (incumbent) | Lakas–CMD | 172,694 | 100.00 |
| Total | | 172,694 | 100.00 |
| Valid votes | | 172,694 | 75.99 |
| Invalid/blank votes | | 54,561 | 24.01 |
| Total votes | | 227,255 | 100.00 |
| Registered voters/turnout | | 309,462 | 73.44 |
| Lakas hold | | | |
Source: Commission on Elections

=== 3rd district ===
2025 Cavite's 3rd congressional district election
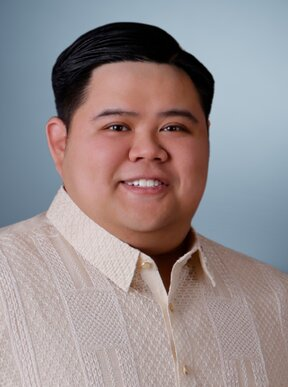

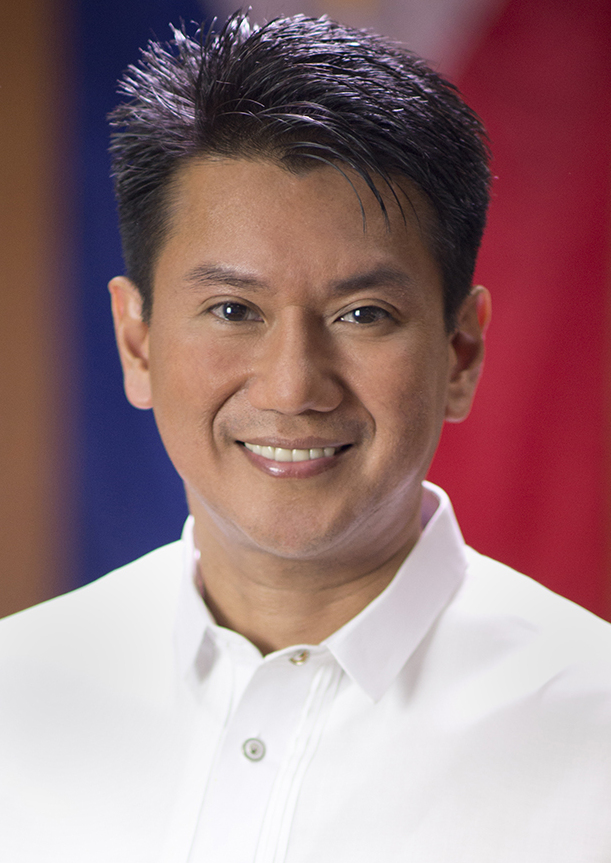
| Candidate | AJ Advincula | Emmanuel Maliksi |
| Party | NUP | Aksyon |
| popular vote | 98,072 | 78,916 |
| Percentage | 53.10% | 42.73% |
House representative before election
AJ Advicula
NUP
Elected House representative
AJ Advicula
NUP

Incumbent AJ Advincula of the National Unity Party ran for a second term.

Advincula won re-election against former Imus mayor Emmanuel Maliksi (Aksyon Demokratiko) and Marvyn Maristela (Workers' and Peasants' Party).

| Candidate | Party | Votes | % |
|---|---|---|---|
| AJ Advincula (incumbent) | National Unity Party | 98,072 | 53.10 |
| Emmanuel Maliksi | Aksyon Demokratiko | 78,916 | 42.73 |
| Marvyn Maristela | Workers' and Peasants' Party | 7,700 | 4.17 |
| Total | | 184,688 | 100.00 |
| Valid votes | | 184,688 | 96.22 |
| Invalid/blank votes | | 7,261 | 3.78 |
| Total votes | | 191,949 | 100.00 |
| Registered voters/turnout | | 238,853 | 80.36 |
| NUP hold | | | |
Source: Commission on Elections

=== 4th district ===
2025 Cavite's 4th congressional district election
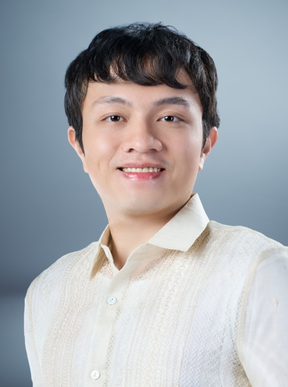
| | | IND |
| Candidate | Kiko Barzaga | Jesse Frani |
| Party | NUP | Independent |
| popular vote | 165,942 | 150,316 |
| Percentage | 50.37% | 45.63% |
House representative before election
Elpidio Barzaga Jr.
NUP
Elected House representative
Kiko Barzaga
NUP

The seat is vacant after Elpidio Barzaga Jr. of the National Unity Party (NUP) died on April 27, 2024.

The NUP nominated Barzaga's son, Dasmariñas councilor Kiko Barzaga, who won the election against three other candidates.

| Candidate | Party | Votes | % |
|---|---|---|---|
| Kiko Barzaga | National Unity Party | 165,942 | 50.37 |
| Jesse Frani | Independent | 150,316 | 45.63 |
| Osmundo Calupad | Independent | 9,583 | 2.91 |
| Leysander Ordenes | Partido Lakas ng Masa | 3,591 | 1.09 |
| Total | | 329,432 | 100.00 |
| Valid votes | | 329,432 | 93.65 |
| Invalid/blank votes | | 22,325 | 6.35 |
| Total votes | | 351,757 | 100.00 |
| Registered voters/turnout | | 432,844 | 81.27 |
| NUP hold | | | |
Source: Commission on Elections

=== 5th district ===
2025 Cavite's 5th congressional district election
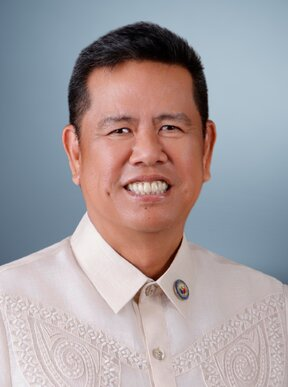
| | | IND |
| Candidate | Roy Loyola | Julie Tolentino |
| Party | NPC | Independent |
| Popular vote | 149,622 | 95,646 |
| Percentage | 61.00% | 39.00% |
House representative before election
Roy Loyola
NPC
Elected House representative
Roy Loyola
NPC

Incumbent Roy Loyola of the Nationalist People's Coalition ran for a second term.

Loyola won re-election against Julie Tolentino (Independent).

| Candidate | Party | Votes | % |
|---|---|---|---|
| Roy Loyola (incumbent) | Nationalist People's Coalition | 149,622 | 61.00 |
| Julie Tolentino | Independent | 95,646 | 39.00 |
| Total | | 245,268 | 100.00 |
| Valid votes | | 245,268 | 93.78 |
| Invalid/blank votes | | 16,281 | 6.22 |
| Total votes | | 261,549 | 100.00 |
| Registered voters/turnout | | 315,944 | 82.78 |
| NPC hold | | | |
Source: Commission on Elections

=== 6th district ===
2025 Cavite's 6th congressional district election
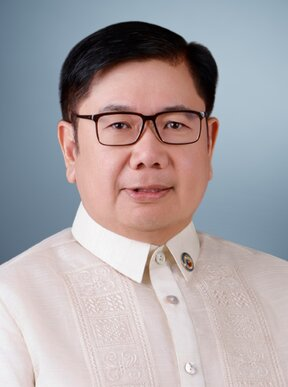
| Candidate | Antonio Ferrer |
| Party | NUP |
| popular vote | 121,284 |
| Percentage | 100.00%' |
House representative before election
Antonio Ferrer
NUP
Elected House representative
Antonio Ferrer
NUP

Incumbent Antonio Ferrer of the National Unity Party won re-election for a second term unopposed.

| Candidate | Party | Votes | % |
|---|---|---|---|
| Antonio Ferrer (incumbent) | National Unity Party | 121,284 | 100.00 |
| Total | | 121,284 | 100.00 |
| Valid votes | | 121,284 | 82.05 |
| Invalid/blank votes | | 26,541 | 17.95 |
| Total votes | | 147,825 | 100.00 |
| Registered voters/turnout | | 212,830 | 69.46 |
| NUP hold | | | |
Source: Commission on Elections

=== 7th district ===
2025 Cavite's 7th congressional district election
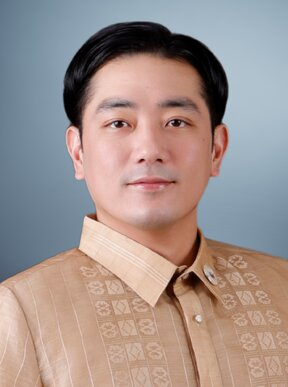
| | | IND |
| Candidate | Crispin Diego Remulla | Michael Angelo Santos |
| Party | NUP | Independent |
| popular vote | 190,499 | 27,505 |
| Percentage | 80.88% | 11.68% |
House representative before election
Crispin Diego Remulla
NUP
Elected House representative
Crispin Diego Remulla
NUP

Incumbent Crispin Diego Remulla of the National Unity Party ran for a full term. He won a special election on February 25, 2023, to succeed his father, Jesus Crispin Remulla, who resigned on June 30, 2022, upon his appointment as Secretary of Justice.

Remulla won re-election against two other candidates.

| Candidate | Party | Votes | % |
|---|---|---|---|
| Crispin Diego Remulla (incumbent) | National Unity Party | 190,499 | 80.88 |
| Michael Angelo Santos | Independent | 27,505 | 11.68 |
| Wally Abutin | Workers' and Peasants' Party | 17,531 | 7.44 |
| Total | | 235,535 | 100.00 |
| Valid votes | | 235,535 | 81.38 |
| Invalid/blank votes | | 53,897 | 18.62 |
| Total votes | | 289,432 | 100.00 |
| Registered voters/turnout | | 363,491 | 79.63 |
| NUP hold | | | |
Source: Commission on Elections

=== 8th district ===
2025 Cavite's 8th congressional district election
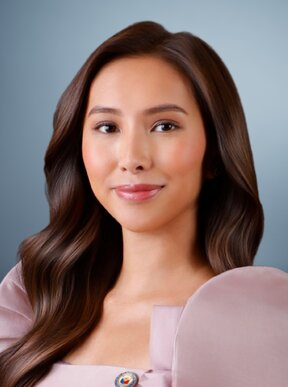
| | | AKSYON |
| Candidate | Aniela Tolentino | Irene Bencito |
| Party | NUP | Aksyon |
| popular vote | 167,163 | 45,398 |
| Percentage | 76.60% | 20.80% |
House representative before election
Aniela Tolentino
NUP
Elected House representative
Aniela Tolentino
NUP

Incumbent Aniela Tolentino of the National Unity Party ran for a second term.

Tolentino won re-election against provincial board member Irene Bencito (Aksyon Demokratiko) and Allan Par (Independent).

| Candidate | Party | Votes | % |
|---|---|---|---|
| Aniela Tolentino (incumbent) | National Unity Party | 167,163 | 76.60 |
| Irene Bencito | Aksyon Demokratiko | 45,398 | 20.80 |
| Allan Par | Independent | 5,676 | 2.60 |
| Total | | 218,237 | 100.00 |
| Valid votes | | 218,237 | 85.46 |
| Invalid/blank votes | | 37,131 | 14.54 |
| Total votes | | 255,368 | 100.00 |
| Registered voters/turnout | | 312,602 | 81.69 |
| NUP hold | | | |
Source: Commission on Elections

== Laguna ==
=== 1st district ===
2025 Laguna's 1st congressional district election
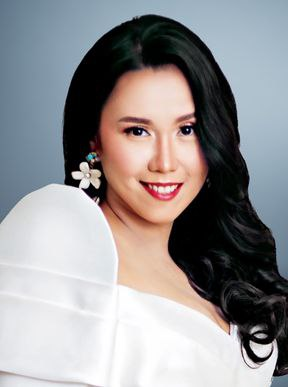
| Candidate | Ann Matibag |
| Party | Lakas |
| popular vote | 111,214 |
| Percentage | 100.00% |
House representative before election
Ann Matibag
Lakas
Elected House representative
Ann Matibag
Lakas

Incumbent Ann Matibag of Lakas–CMD won re-election for a second term unopposed. She was previously affiliated with PDP–Laban.

| Candidate | Party | Votes | % |
|---|---|---|---|
| Ann Matibag (incumbent) | Lakas–CMD | 111,214 | 100.00 |
| Total | | 111,214 | 100.00 |
| Valid votes | | 111,214 | 76.60 |
| Invalid/blank votes | | 33,975 | 23.40 |
| Total votes | | 145,189 | 100.00 |
| Registered voters/turnout | | 188,803 | 76.90 |
| Lakas hold | | | |
Source: Commission on Elections

=== 2nd district ===
2025 Laguna's 2nd congressional district election
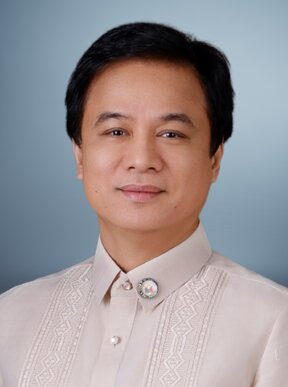
| | | NUP |
| Candidate | Ramil Hernandez | Dondon Hain |
| Party | Lakas | NUP |
| popular vote | 142,815 | 136,353 |
| Percentage | 51.16% | 48.84% |
House representative before election
Ruth Hernandez
Lakas
Elected House representative
Ramil Hernandez
Lakas

Incumbent Ruth Hernandez of Lakas–CMD retired to run for governor of Laguna. She was previously affiliated with PDP–Laban.

Lakas–CMD nominated Hernandez's husband, Laguna governor Ramil Hernandez, who won the election running against Cabuyao councilor Dondon Hain.

| Candidate | Party | Votes | % |
|---|---|---|---|
| Ramil Hernandez | Lakas–CMD | 142,815 | 51.16 |
| Dondon Hain | National Unity Party | 136,353 | 48.84 |
| Total | | 279,168 | 100.00 |
| Valid votes | | 279,168 | 96.10 |
| Invalid/blank votes | | 11,341 | 3.90 |
| Total votes | | 290,509 | 100.00 |
| Registered voters/turnout | | 350,865 | 82.80 |
| Lakas hold | | | |
Source: Commission on Elections

=== 3rd district ===
2025 Laguna's 3rd congressional district election
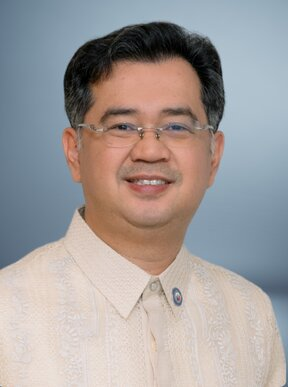
| | | RP |
| Candidate | Loreto Amante | Ernesto Empemano |
| Party | Lakas | RP |
| popular vote | 238,140 | 28,730 |
| Percentage | 86.38% | 10.42% |
House representative before election
Loreto Amante
Lakas
Elected House representative
Loreto Amante
Lakas

Incumbent Loreto Amante of Lakas–CMD ran for a second term. He was previously affiliated with PDP–Laban.

Amante won re-election against three other candidates.

| Candidate | Party | Votes | % |
|---|---|---|---|
| Loreto Amante (incumbent) | Lakas–CMD | 238,140 | 86.38 |
| Ernesto Empemano | Reform PH Party | 28,730 | 10.42 |
| Ronnie Masirag | Independent | 4,697 | 1.70 |
| Ocha Mamaril | Independent | 4,106 | 1.49 |
| Total | | 275,673 | 100.00 |
| Valid votes | | 275,673 | 87.65 |
| Invalid/blank votes | | 38,829 | 12.35 |
| Total votes | | 314,502 | 100.00 |
| Registered voters/turnout | | 372,861 | 84.35 |
| Lakas hold | | | |
Source: Commission on Elections

=== 4th district ===
2025 Laguna's 3rd congressional district election
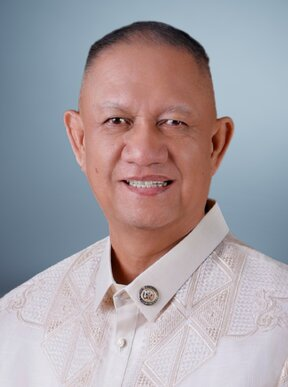
| | | NUP |
| Candidate | Benjamin Agarao Jr. | Tony Carolino |
| Party | PFP | NUP |
| popular vote | 150,553 | 150,217 |
| Percentage | 50.06% | 49.94% |
House representative before election
Jam Agarao
PFP
Elected House representative
Benjamin Agarao Jr.
PFP

Incumbent Jam Agarao of Partido Federal ng Pilipinas (PFP) retired to run for the Laguna Provincial Board in the 4th provincial district. She was previously affiliated with PDP–Laban.

The PFP nominated Agarao's father, former representative Benjamin Agarao Jr., who won the election against former Santa Maria mayor Tony Carolino (National Unity Party).

| Candidate | Party | Votes | % |
|---|---|---|---|
| Benjamin Agarao Jr. | Partido Federal ng Pilipinas | 150,553 | 50.06 |
| Tony Carolino | National Unity Party | 150,217 | 49.94 |
| Total | | 300,770 | 100.00 |
| Valid votes | | 300,770 | 92.55 |
| Invalid/blank votes | | 24,220 | 7.45 |
| Total votes | | 324,990 | 100.00 |
| Registered voters/turnout | | 403,696 | 80.50 |
| PFP hold | | | |
Source: Commission on Elections

=== Biñan ===
2025 Biñan's at-large congressional district election
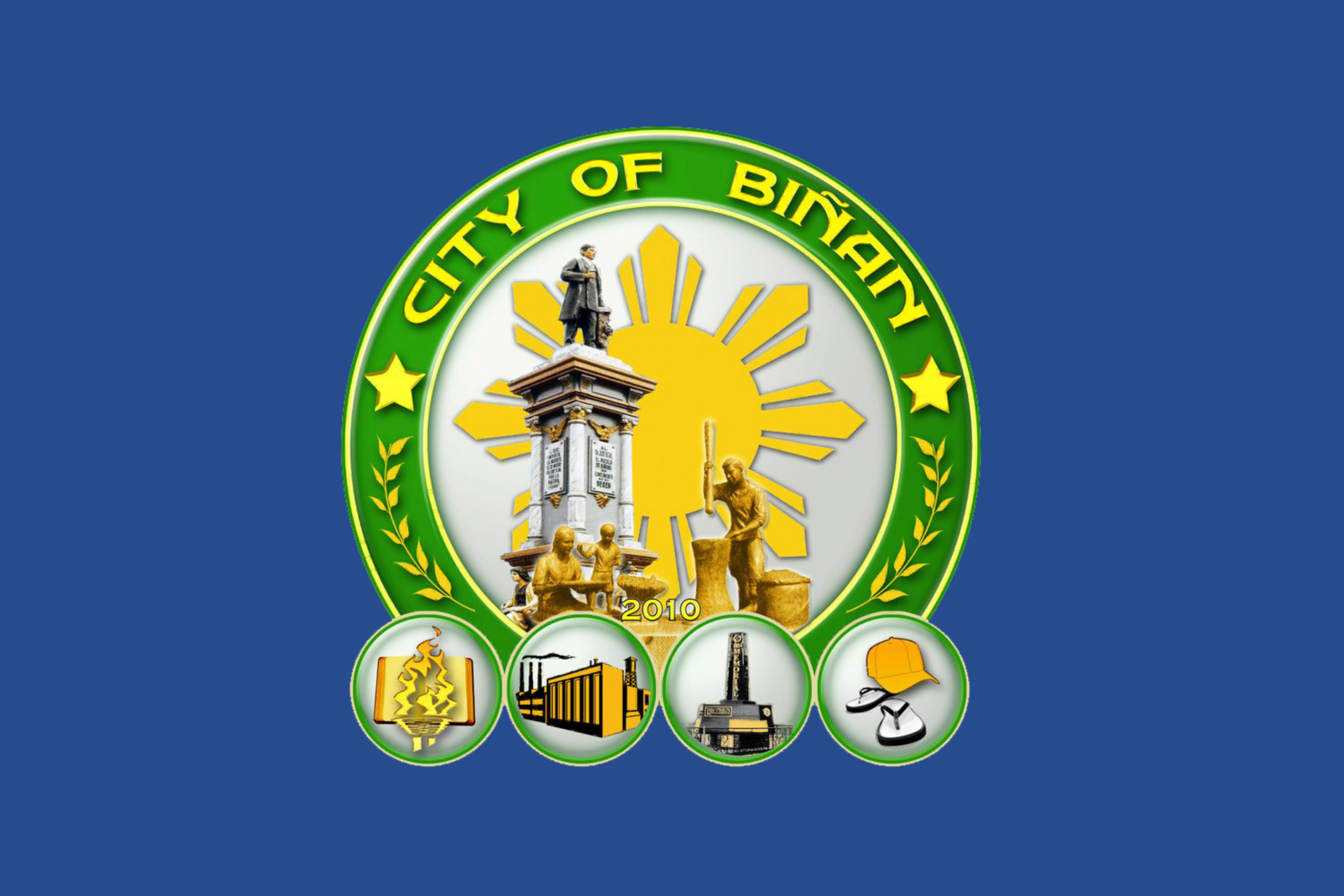

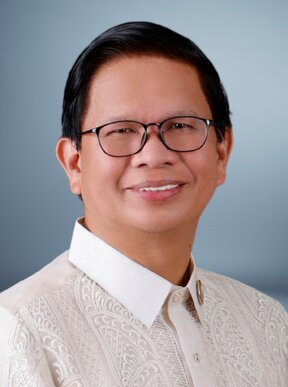
| | | PFP |
| Candidate | Arman Dimaguila | Mike Yatco |
| Party | Lakas | PFP |
| Popular vote | 102,049 | 60,922 |
| Percentage | 62.62% | 37.38% |
House representative before election
Len Alonte
Lakas
Elected House representative
Arman Dimaguila
Lakas

Incumbent Len Alonte of Lakas–CMD was term-limited. She was previously affiliated with PDP–Laban.

Lakas–CMD nominated Biñan mayor Arman Dimaguila, who won the election against Mike Yatco (Partido Federal ng Pilipinas).

| Candidate | Party | Votes | % |
|---|---|---|---|
| Arman Dimaguila | Lakas–CMD | 102,049 | 62.62 |
| Mike Yatco | Partido Federal ng Pilipinas | 60,922 | 37.38 |
| Total | | 162,971 | 100.00 |
| Valid votes | | 162,971 | 94.69 |
| Invalid/blank votes | | 9,139 | 5.31 |
| Total votes | | 172,110 | 100.00 |
| Registered voters/turnout | | 227,474 | 75.66 |
| Lakas hold | | | |
Source: Commission on Elections

=== Calamba ===
2025 Calamba's at-large congressional district election
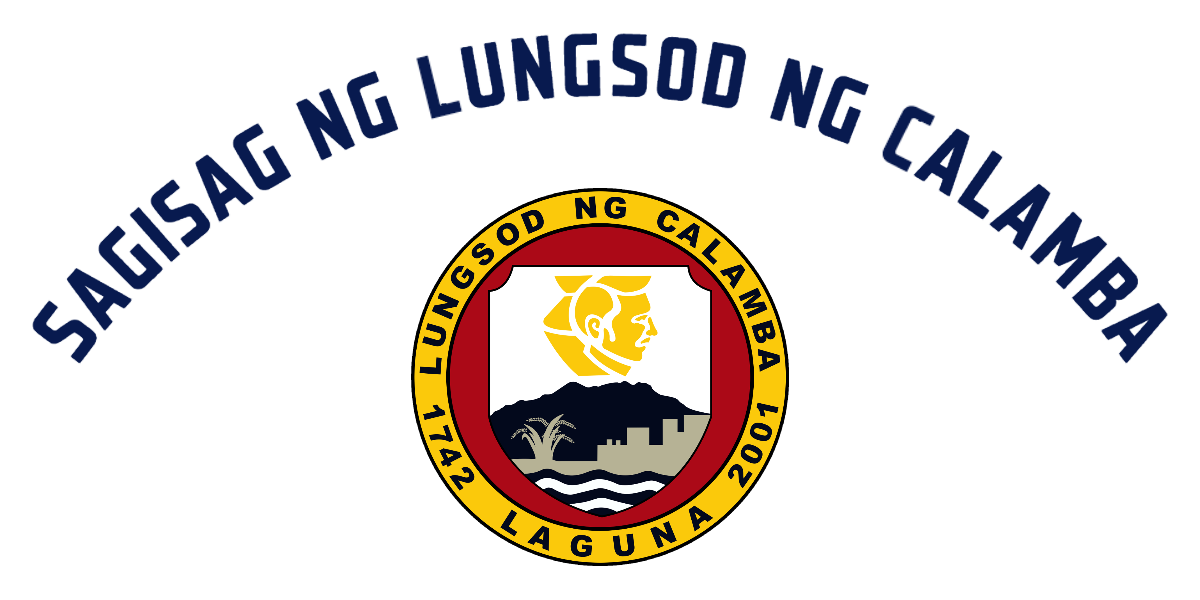

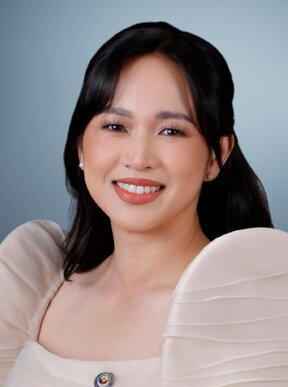
| | | NP | PFP |
| Candidate | Cha Hernandez | Jun Chipeco | Turne Lajara |
| Party | Lakas | Nacionalista | PFP |
| popular vote | 167,282 | 39,293 | 38,926 |
| Percentage | 66.42% | 15.60% | 15.46% |
House representative before election
Cha Hernandez
Lakas
Elected House representative
Cha Hernandez
Lakas

Incumbent Cha Hernandez of Lakas–CMD ran for a second term. She was previously affiliated with PDP–Laban.

Hernandez won re-election against former representative Jun Chipeco (Nacionalista Party), Calamba councilor Turne Lajara (Partido Federal ng Pilipinas) and Eugiene Salom (Akay National Political Party).

| Candidate | Party | Votes | % |
|---|---|---|---|
| Cha Hernandez (incumbent) | Lakas–CMD | 167,282 | 66.42 |
| Jun Chipeco | Nacionalista Party | 39,293 | 15.60 |
| Turne Lajara | Partido Federal ng Pilipinas | 38,926 | 15.46 |
| Eugiene Salom | Akay National Political Party | 6,356 | 2.52 |
| Total | | 251,857 | 100.00 |
| Valid votes | | 251,857 | 94.25 |
| Invalid/blank votes | | 15,370 | 5.75 |
| Total votes | | 267,227 | 100.00 |
| Registered voters/turnout | | 364,766 | 73.26 |
| Lakas hold | | | |
Source: Commission on Elections

=== Santa Rosa ===
2025 Santa Rosa's at-large congressional district election
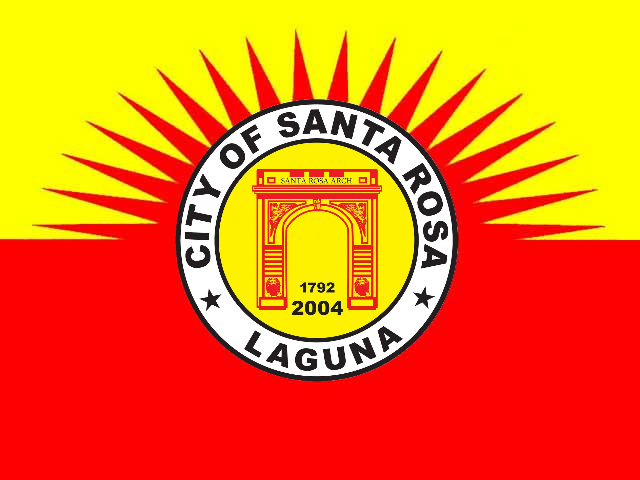

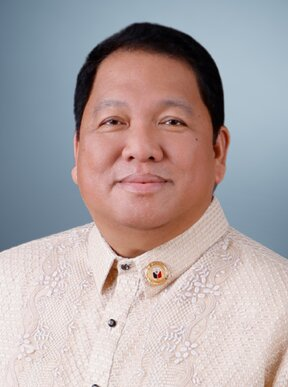
| | | NUP | AKAY |
| Candidate | Roy Gonzales | Danzel Fernandez | Sonia Algabre |
| Party | Lakas | NUP | AKAY |
| popular vote | 86,177 | 60,441 | 27,958 |
| Percentage | 49.36% | 34.62% | 16.01% |
House representative before election
Danilo Fernandez
NUP
Elected House representative
Roy Gonzales
Lakas

Incumbent Danilo Fernandez of the National Unity Party (NUP) retired to run for governor of Laguna.

The NUP nominated Fernandez's son, provincial board member Danzel Fernandez, who lost to city councilor Roy Gonzales (Lakas–CMD). City councilor Sonia Algabre (Akay National Political Party) also ran for representative.

| Candidate | Party | Votes | % |
|---|---|---|---|
| Roy Gonzales | Lakas–CMD | 86,177 | 49.36 |
| Danzel Fernandez | National Unity Party | 60,441 | 34.62 |
| Sonia Algabre | Akay National Political Party | 27,958 | 16.01 |
| Total | | 174,576 | 100.00 |
| Valid votes | | 174,576 | 93.81 |
| Invalid/blank votes | | 11,526 | 6.19 |
| Total votes | | 186,102 | 100.00 |
| Registered voters/turnout | | 231,659 | 80.33 |
| Lakas gain from NUP | | | |
Source: Commission on Elections

== Quezon ==
2025 Quezon's congressional district election
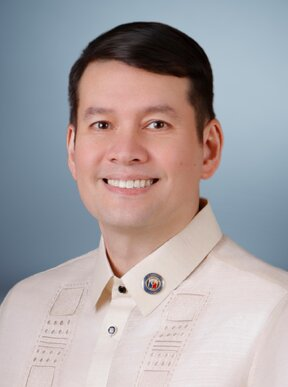
| Candidate | Mark Enverga |
| Party | NPC |
| popular vote | 252,236 |
| Percentage | 100.00% |
House representative before election
Mark Enverga
NPC
Elected House representative
Mark Enverga
NPC

=== 1st district ===
Incumbent Mark Enverga of the Nationalist People's Coalition won re-election for a third term unopposed.

| Candidate | Party | Votes | % |
|---|---|---|---|
| Mark Enverga (incumbent) | Nationalist People's Coalition | 252,236 | 100.00 |
| Total | | 252,236 | 100.00 |
| Valid votes | | 252,236 | 79.51 |
| Invalid/blank votes | | 65,019 | 20.49 |
| Total votes | | 317,255 | 100.00 |
| Registered voters/turnout | | 377,065 | 84.14 |
| NPC hold | | | |
Source: Commission on Elections

=== 2nd district ===
2025 Quezon's 2nd congressional district election
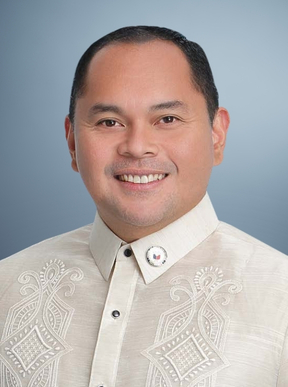
| Candidate | David Suarez |
| Party | Lakas |
| popular vote | 286,091 |
| Percentage | 100.00% |
House representative before election
David Suarez
Lakas
Elected House representative
David Suarez
Lakas

Incumbent David Suarez of Lakas–CMD won re-election for a third term unopposed. He was previously affiliated with the Nacionalista Party.

| Candidate | Party | Votes | % |
|---|---|---|---|
| David Suarez (incumbent) | Lakas–CMD | 286,091 | 100.00 |
| Total | | 286,091 | 100.00 |
| Valid votes | | 286,091 | 64.31 |
| Invalid/blank votes | | 158,767 | 35.69 |
| Total votes | | 444,858 | 100.00 |
| Registered voters/turnout | | 516,199 | 86.18 |
| Lakas hold | | | |
Source: Commission on Elections

=== 3rd district ===
2025 Quezon's 3rd congressional district election
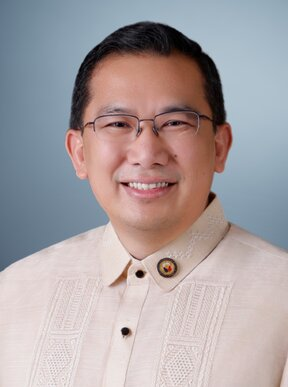
| | | IND |
| Candidate | Reynante Arrogancia | Matt Florido |
| Party | NPC | Independent |
| popular vote | 163,239 | 71,465 |
| Percentage | 69.55% | 30.45% |
House representative before election
Reynante Arrogancia
NPC
Elected House representative
Reynante Arrogancia
NPC

Incumbent Reynante Arrogancia of the Nationalist People's Coalition ran for a second term. He was previously affiliated with the Partido para sa Demokratikong Reporma.

Arrogancia won re-election against General Luna mayor Matt Florido (Independent). On April 30, 2025, the Commission on Election's First Division ordered Florido's disqualification for alleged vote buying at an event in Buenavista on April 6.

| Candidate | Party | Votes | % |
|---|---|---|---|
| Reynante Arrogancia (incumbent) | Nationalist People's Coalition | 163,239 | 69.55 |
| Matt Florido | Independent | 71,465 | 30.45 |
| Total | | 234,704 | 100.00 |
| Valid votes | | 234,704 | 92.60 |
| Invalid/blank votes | | 18,753 | 7.40 |
| Total votes | | 253,457 | 100.00 |
| Registered voters/turnout | | 304,144 | 83.33 |
| NPC hold | | | |
Source: Commission on Elections

=== 4th district ===
2025 Quezon's 4th congressional district election
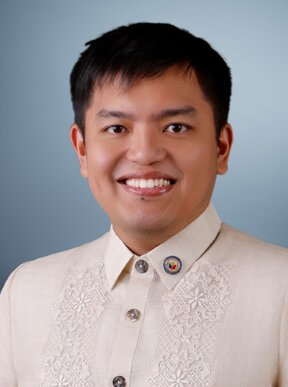
| Candidate | Keith Micah Tan |
| Party | NPC |
| popular vote | 199,930 |
| Percentage | 100.00% |
House representative before election
Keith Micah Tan
NPC
Elected House representative
Keith Micah Tan
NPC

Incumbent Keith Micah Tan of the Nationalist People's Coalition won re-election for a second term unopposed.

| Candidate | Party | Votes | % |
|---|---|---|---|
| Keith Micah Tan (incumbent) | Nationalist People's Coalition | 199,930 | 100.00 |
| Total | | 199,930 | 100.00 |
| Valid votes | | 199,930 | 84.49 |
| Invalid/blank votes | | 36,705 | 15.51 |
| Total votes | | 236,635 | 100.00 |
| Registered voters/turnout | | 298,748 | 79.21 |
| NPC hold | | | |
Source: Commission on Elections

== Rizal ==
=== 1st district ===
2025 Rizal's 1st congressional district election
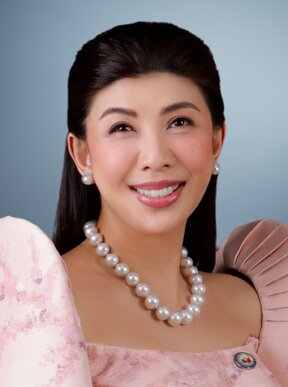
| | | IND |
| Candidate | Mia Ynares | JB Pallasigue |
| Party | NPC | Independent |
| popular vote | 255,258 | 74,704 |
| Percentage | 72.03% | 21.08% |
House representative before election
Jack Duavit
NPC
Elected House representative
Mia Ynares
NPC

Incumbent Jack Duavit of the Nationalist People's Coalition (NPC) was term-limited.

The NPC nominated Mia Ynares, sister of Rizal governor Nina Ynares, who won the election against three other candidates.

| Candidate | Party | Votes | % |
|---|---|---|---|
| Mia Ynares | Nationalist People's Coalition | 255,258 | 72.03 |
| JB Pallasigue | Independent | 74,704 | 21.08 |
| Jay Narciso | Partido Demokratiko Sosyalista ng Pilipinas | 14,343 | 4.05 |
| Anton Galias | Partido para sa Demokratikong Reporma | 10,050 | 2.84 |
| Total | | 354,355 | 100.00 |
| Valid votes | | 354,355 | 83.75 |
| Invalid/blank votes | | 68,745 | 16.25 |
| Total votes | | 423,100 | 100.00 |
| Registered voters/turnout | | 555,121 | 76.22 |
| NPC hold | | | |
Source: Commission on Elections

=== 2nd district ===
2025 Rizal's 2nd congressional district election
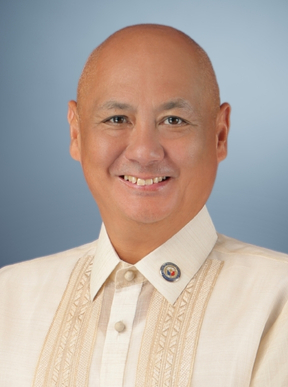
| | | IND |
| Candidate | Dino Tanjuatco | Boy Mendiola |
| Party | NPC | Independent |
| popular vote | 182,212 | 29,796 |
| Percentage | 85.95% | 14.05% |
House representative before election
Dino Tanjuatco
NPC
Elected House representative
Dino Tanjuatco
NPC

Incumbent Dino Tanjuatco of the Nationalist People's Coalition ran running for a second term. He was previously affiliated with the Liberal Party.

Tanjuatco won re-election against Boy Mendiola (Independent).

| Candidate | Party | Votes | % |
|---|---|---|---|
| Dino Tanjuatco (incumbent) | Nationalist People's Coalition | 182,212 | 85.95 |
| Boy Mendiola | Independent | 29,796 | 14.05 |
| Total | | 212,008 | 100.00 |
| Valid votes | | 212,008 | 88.49 |
| Invalid/blank votes | | 27,566 | 11.51 |
| Total votes | | 239,574 | 100.00 |
| Registered voters/turnout | | 306,943 | 78.05 |
| NPC hold | | | |
Source: Commission on Elections

=== 3rd district ===
2025 Rizal's 3rd congressional district election
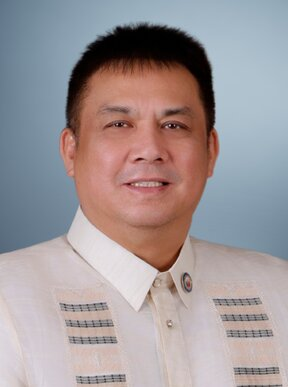
| | | AKAY |
| Candidate | Jojo Garcia | Paeng Diaz |
| Party | NPC | AKAY |
| popular vote | 67,417 | 34,210 |
| Percentage | 66.34% | 33.66% |
House representative before election
Jojo Garcia
NPC
Elected House representative
Jojo Garcia
NPC

Incumbent Jojo Garcia of the Nationalist People's Coalition ran for a second term.

Garcia won re-election against former San Mateo vice mayor Paeng Diaz (Akay National Political Party).

| Candidate | Party | Votes | % |
|---|---|---|---|
| Jojo Garcia (incumbent) | Nationalist People's Coalition | 67,417 | 66.34 |
| Paeng Diaz | Akay National Political Party | 34,210 | 33.66 |
| Total | | 101,627 | 100.00 |
| Valid votes | | 101,627 | 94.85 |
| Invalid/blank votes | | 5,520 | 5.15 |
| Total votes | | 107,147 | 100.00 |
| Registered voters/turnout | | 134,335 | 79.76 |
| NPC hold | | | |
Source: Commission on Elections

=== 4th district ===
2025 Rizal's 4th congressional district election
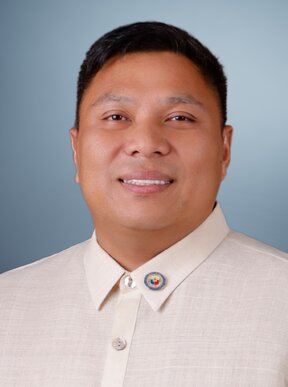

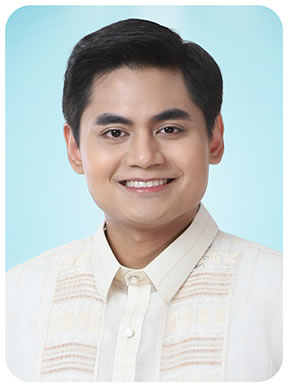
| Candidate | Dennis Hernandez | Fidel Nograles |
| Party | NPC | Lakas |
| popular vote | 87,659 | 80,004 |
| Percentage | 52.28% | 47.72% |
House representative before election
Fidel Nograles
Lakas
Elected House representative
Dennis Hernandez
NPC

Incumbent Fidel Nograles of Lakas–CMD ran for a third term.

Nograles was defeated by former Rodriguez mayor Dennis Hernandez (Nationalist People's Coalition).

| Candidate | Party | Votes | % |
|---|---|---|---|
| Dennis Hernandez | Nationalist People's Coalition | 87,659 | 52.28 |
| Fidel Nograles (incumbent) | Lakas–CMD | 80,004 | 47.72 |
| Total | | 167,663 | 100.00 |
| Valid votes | | 167,663 | 96.44 |
| Invalid/blank votes | | 6,195 | 3.56 |
| Total votes | | 173,858 | 100.00 |
| Registered voters/turnout | | 219,447 | 79.23 |
| NPC gain from Lakas | | | |
Source: Commission on Elections

=== Antipolo's 1st district ===
2025 Antipolo's 1st congressional district election
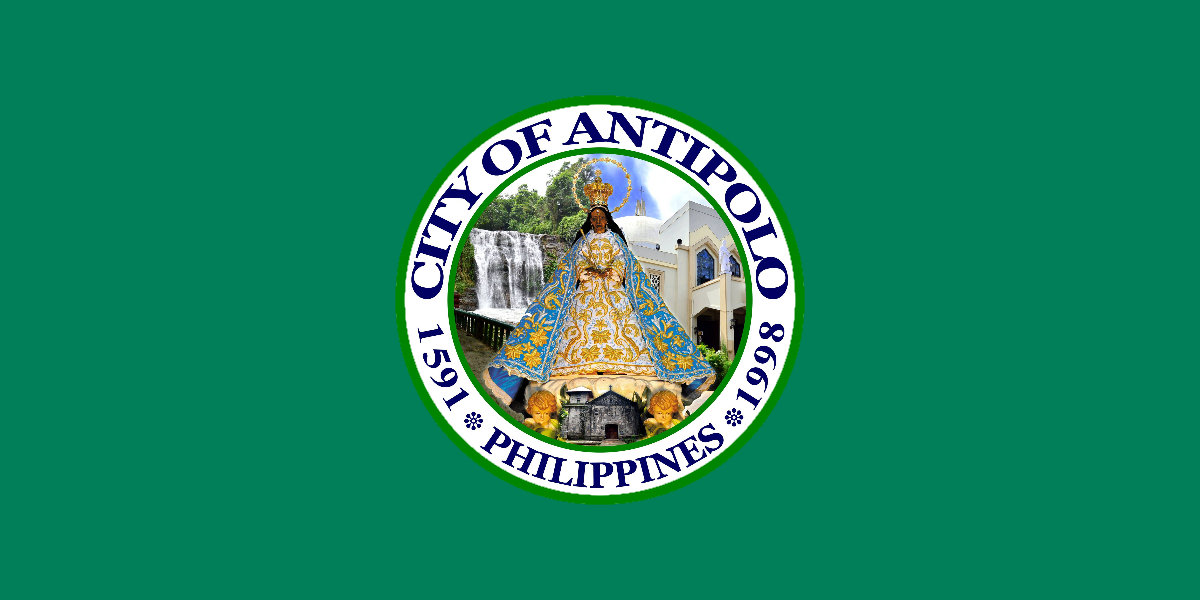

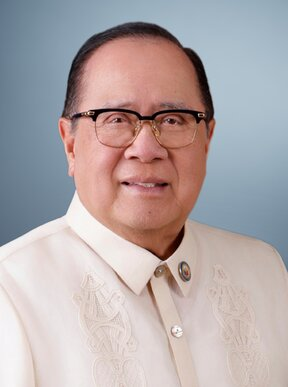
| | | IND |
| Candidate | Ronaldo Puno | Manuel Relorcasa |
| Party | NUP | Independent |
| popular vote | 119,885 | 9,113 |
| Percentage | 87.30% | 6.64% |
House representative before election
Roberto Puno
NUP
Elected House representative
Ronaldo Puno
NUP

Incumbent Roberto Puno of the National Unity Party (NUP) retired.

The NUP nominated Puno's brother, former Secretary of the Interior and Local Government Ronaldo Puno, who won against former city councilor Sonia Ampo (Workers' and Peasants' Party) and Manuel Relorcasa (Independent).

| Candidate | Party | Votes | % |
|---|---|---|---|
| Ronaldo Puno | National Unity Party | 119,885 | 87.30 |
| Manuel Relorcasa | Independent | 9,113 | 6.64 |
| Sonia Ampo | Workers' and Peasants' Party | 8,332 | 6.07 |
| Total | | 137,330 | 100.00 |
| Valid votes | | 137,330 | 88.40 |
| Invalid/blank votes | | 18,022 | 11.60 |
| Total votes | | 155,352 | 100.00 |
| Registered voters/turnout | | 212,925 | 72.96 |
| NUP hold | | | |
Source: Commission on Elections

=== Antipolo's 2nd district ===
2025 Antipolo's 2nd congressional district election
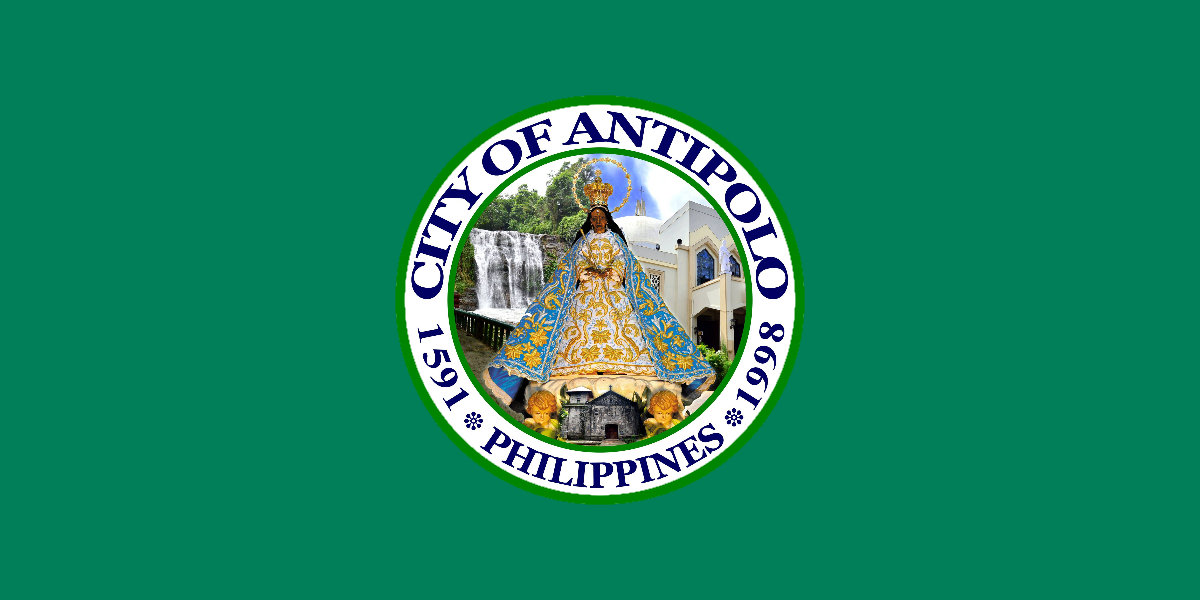

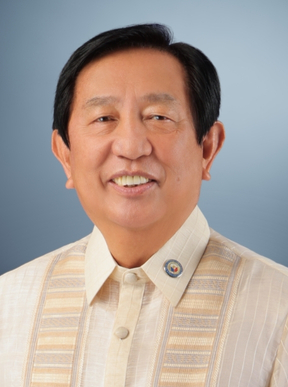
| Candidate | Romeo Acop |
| Party | NUP |
| popular vote | 131,925 |
| Percentage | 100.00% |
House representative before election
Romeo Acop
NUP
Elected House representative
Romeo Acop
NUP

Incumbent Romeo Acop of the National Unity Party won re-election for a second term unopposed.

| Candidate | Party | Votes | % |
|---|---|---|---|
| Romeo Acop (incumbent) | National Unity Party | 131,925 | 100.00 |
| Total | | 131,925 | 100.00 |
| Valid votes | | 131,925 | 74.78 |
| Invalid/blank votes | | 44,496 | 25.22 |
| Total votes | | 176,421 | 100.00 |
| Registered voters/turnout | | 242,872 | 72.64 |
| NUP hold | | | |
Source: Commission on Elections
