= 2013 Biñan local elections =

2013 Biñan mayoral election
- May 13, 2013
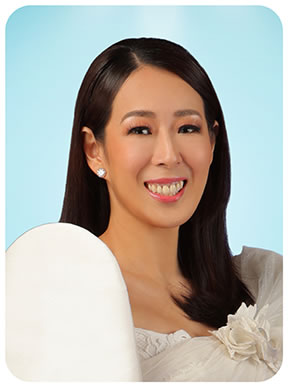
Nominee	Marlyn "Len-Len" Alonte-Naguiat	Joaquin Borja	Reynaldo Cardeño
Party	Liberal	Independent	NPC
Running mate	Walfredo Dimaguila, Jr.		Rene Manabat (UNA)
Popular vote	25,935	7,057	851
Percentage	76.63	19.53	2.51
Mayor before election
Marlyn "Len-Len" Alonte
Liberal
Elected mayor
Marlyn "Len-Len" Alonte
Liberal

Local elections were held in Biñan on May 13, 2013, within the Philippine general election. The voters elected for the elective local posts in the city: the mayor, vice mayor, and ten councilors.

== Overview ==
The incumbent Mayor Marlyn "Len-Len" Alonte-Naguiat decided to run as a re-electionist under the Liberal Party, her opponents were Reynaldo Cardeño, NPC's nominee and Joaquin Borja, an independent candidate.

Mayor Marlyn's running mate was Walfredo Dimaguila, Jr. also under the Liberal Party.

== Results ==
The candidates for mayor and vice mayor with the highest number of votes wins the seat; they are voted separately, therefore, they may be of different parties when elected.

=== Mayoral and vice mayoral elections ===
2013 Biñan mayoral election
Party	Candidate	Votes	%
Liberal	Len Alonte	25,935	71.79
Independent	Joaquin Borja	7,057	19.53
NPC	Reynaldo Cardeño	851	2.36
Margin of victory		18,878	52.25%
Invalid or blank votes		2,284	6.32
Total votes		36,127	100.00
Liberal hold			

2013 Biñan vice mayoral election
Party	Candidate	Votes	%
Liberal	Arman Dimaguila	19,426	53.77
UNA	Rene Manabat	14,397	39.85
Margin of victory		5,029	13.92%
Invalid or blank votes		2,304	6.38
Total votes		36,127	100.00
Liberal hold			

=== City Council ===
Voters will elect ten (10) councilors to comprise the City Council or the Sangguniang Panlungsod. Candidates are voted separately so there are chances where winning candidates will have unequal number of votes and may come from different political parties. The ten candidates with the highest number of votes win the seats.

2013 Biñan City Council
Party	Candidate	Votes	%
Liberal	Gel Alonte	21,829	8.38
Liberal	Magtanggol Jose C. Carait III	18,930	7.26
Liberal	Ramon Bejasa	18,881	7.25
UNA	Jose Ruben Yatco	18,647	7.16
Liberal	Marielle B. Micor	17,962	6.89
Liberal	Jaime M. Salandanan	17,791	6.83
Liberal	Vicente J. Tan Gana Jr.	17,628	6.76
UNA	Liza Cardeño	16,641	6.39
Liberal	Gener D. Romantigue	16,332	6.27
Liberal	Romulo "Ome" Reyes	14,826	5.69
Liberal	Alexis Desuasido	14,246	5.47
Liberal	Ramon Garcia	13,624	5.23
UNA	Ramon Carrillo	12,878	4.94
Independent	Elmario B. Dimaranan	7,612	2.92
Independent	Alvin Manarin	4,925	1.89
NPC	Hermenegildo Sotto	3,833	1.47
Independent	Venancio Cabral, Jr.	3,198	1.23
NPC	Alfredo Alzona	2,850	1.09
Independent	Kapitan Casing Pabalan	2,360	0.91
Independent	Boy Kahig Onofre	2,293	0.88
Independent	Edgar Capili	1,763	0.68
NPC	Ferdinand Ama	1,756	0.67
NPC	Rodolfo Diokno	1,737	0.67
NPC	Michael Potenciano III	1,585	0.61
Independent	Rhoniel Dilag	1,257	0.48
Independent	Rio Dueñas	1,175	0.45
NPC	Ghel Navarroza	1,108	0.43
Independent	Ver Villadiego	1,040	0.40
Independent	Edwin Elyhiyo Frenz Panelo	957	0.37
Independent	Rizal Syluancia	923	0.35
Invalid or blank votes			
Total votes		36,127	100
