= 3rd district =

3rd district or 3rd constituency may refer to:

== France ==
=== Metropolitan France ===
- Ain's 3rd constituency
- Aisne's 3rd constituency
- Allier's 3rd constituency
- Alpes-Maritimes's 3rd constituency
- Ardèche's 3rd constituency
- Ardennes's 3rd constituency
- Aube's 3rd constituency
- Aude's 3rd constituency
- Aveyron's 3rd constituency
- Bouches-du-Rhône's 3rd constituency
- Calvados's 3rd constituency
- Charente's 3rd constituency
- Charente-Maritime's 3rd constituency
- Cher's 3rd constituency
- Côte-d'Or's 3rd constituency
- Côtes-d'Armor's 3rd constituency
- Dordogne's 3rd constituency
- Doubs's 3rd constituency
- Drôme's 3rd constituency
- Eure's 3rd constituency
- Eure-et-Loir's 3rd constituency
- Finistère's 3rd constituency
- Gard's 3rd constituency
- Gironde's 3rd constituency
- Haute-Garonne's 3rd constituency
- Hérault's 3rd constituency
- Ille-et-Vilaine's 3rd constituency
- Indre-et-Loire's 3rd constituency
- Isère's 3rd constituency
- Jura's 3rd constituency
- Landes's 3rd constituency
- Loir-et-Cher's 3rd constituency
- Loire's 3rd constituency
- Loire-Atlantique's 3rd constituency
- Loiret's 3rd constituency
- Lot-et-Garonne's 3rd constituency
- Maine-et-Loire's 3rd constituency
- Manche's 3rd constituency
- Marne's 3rd constituency
- Mayenne's 3rd constituency
- Meurthe-et-Moselle's 3rd constituency
- Morbihan's 3rd constituency
- Moselle's 3rd constituency
- Nièvre's 3rd constituency
- Nord's 3rd constituency
- Oise's 3rd constituency
- Orne's 3rd constituency
- Pas-de-Calais's 3rd constituency
- Puy-de-Dôme's 3rd constituency
- Pyrénées-Atlantiques's 3rd constituency
- Pyrénées-Orientales's 3rd constituency
- Bas-Rhin's 3rd constituency
- Haut-Rhin's 3rd constituency
- Rhône's 3rd constituency
- Sarthe's 3rd constituency
- Savoie's 3rd constituency
- Haute-Savoie's 3rd constituency
- Paris's 3rd constituency
- Saône-et-Loire's 3rd constituency
- Seine-Maritime's 3rd constituency
- Seine-et-Marne's 3rd constituency
- Somme's 3rd constituency
- Yvelines's 3rd constituency
- Deux-Sèvres's 3rd constituency
- Tarn's 3rd constituency
- Var's 3rd constituency
- Vaucluse's 3rd constituency
- Vendée's 3rd constituency
- Vienne's 3rd constituency
- Haute-Vienne's 3rd constituency
- Vosges's 3rd constituency
- Yonne's 3rd constituency
- Essonne's 3rd constituency
- Hauts-de-Seine's 3rd constituency
- Seine-Saint-Denis's 3rd constituency
- Val-de-Marne's 3rd constituency
- Val-d'Oise's 3rd constituency

=== Overseas territories ===
- French Polynesia's 3rd constituency
- Guadeloupe's 3rd constituency
- Martinique's 3rd constituency
- Réunion's 3rd constituency
- Third constituency for French residents overseas

== Japan ==
- Gunma 3rd district (1947–93)
- Fukushima 3rd district
- Hokkaido 3rd district
- Hokkaido 3rd district (1947–1993)
- Kagoshima 3rd district
- Kyoto 3rd district
- Kyoto 3rd district (1928–42)
- Iwate 3rd district
- Mie 3rd district
- Nagano 3rd district
- Saitama 3rd district
- Tokyo 3rd district
- Okinawa 3rd district
- Wakayama 3rd district
- Yamaguchi 3rd district

== Philippines ==
- Batangas's 3rd congressional district
- Bohol's 3rd congressional district
- Cagayan's 3rd congressional district
- Cavite's 3rd congressional district
- Cebu's 3rd congressional district
- Iloilo's 3rd congressional district
- Leyte's 3rd congressional district
- Manila's 3rd congressional district
- Pangasinan's 3rd congressional district
- Quezon's 3rd congressional district
- Quezon City's 3rd congressional district
- Samar's 3rd congressional district

== Poland ==
- District of the Western Pomerania (3rd District)

== United States ==
=== Alabama ===
- Alabama's 3rd congressional district
- Alabama House of Representatives, District 3
- Alabama Senate, District 3

=== Arkansas ===
- Arkansas's 3rd congressional district

=== Arizona ===
- Arizona's 3rd congressional district
- Arizona's 3rd legislative district

=== California ===
- California's 3rd district (disambiguation)

=== Colorado ===
- Colorado's 3rd congressional district
- Colorado's 3rd Senate district

=== Connecticut ===
- Connecticut's 3rd congressional district
- Connecticut's 3rd assembly district

=== Delaware ===
- Delaware's 3rd Senate district

=== Florida ===
- Florida's 3rd congressional district

=== Georgia ===
- Georgia's 3rd congressional district
- Georgia's 3rd Senate district

=== Illinois ===
- Illinois's 3rd congressional district

=== Kansas ===
- Kansas's 3rd congressional district
- Kansas's 3rd Senate district

=== Louisiana ===
- Louisiana's 3rd congressional district
- Louisiana's 3rd State Senate district

=== Maine ===
- Maine's 3rd congressional district

=== Maryland ===
- Maryland's 3rd congressional district

=== Massachusetts ===
- Massachusetts's 3rd congressional district
- Massachusetts Senate's 3rd Essex district
- Massachusetts Senate's 3rd Middlesex district
- Massachusetts House of Representatives' 3rd Barnstable district
- Massachusetts House of Representatives' 3rd Berkshire district
- Massachusetts House of Representatives' 3rd Bristol district
- Massachusetts House of Representatives' 3rd Essex district
- Massachusetts House of Representatives' 3rd Hampden district
- Massachusetts House of Representatives' 3rd Hampshire district
- Massachusetts House of Representatives' 3rd Middlesex district
- Massachusetts House of Representatives' 3rd Norfolk district
- Massachusetts House of Representatives' 3rd Plymouth district
- Massachusetts House of Representatives' 3rd Suffolk district
- Massachusetts House of Representatives' 3rd Worcester district

=== Michigan ===
- Michigan's 3rd congressional district
- Michigan's 3rd House of Representatives district
- Michigan's 3rd Senate district

=== Minnesota ===
- Minnesota's 3rd congressional district
- Minnesota Senate, District 3

=== Mississippi ===
- Mississippi's 3rd congressional district

=== Missouri ===
- Missouri's 3rd congressional district

=== Nebraska ===
- Nebraska's 3rd congressional district

=== Nevada ===
- Nevada's 3rd congressional district
- Nevada's 3rd Senate district

=== New Jersey ===
- New Jersey's 3rd congressional district
- 3rd Legislative District (New Jersey)

=== New Mexico ===
- New Mexico's 3rd congressional district

=== New York ===
==== State ====
- New York's 3rd congressional district
- New York's 3rd State Senate district

==== City ====
- 3rd District (New York City Council)

=== North Carolina ===
- North Carolina's 3rd congressional district

=== Ohio ===
- Ohio's 3rd congressional district

=== Oklahoma ===
- Oklahoma's 3rd congressional district

=== Oregon ===
- Oregon's 3rd congressional district
- Oregon's 3rd State House district

=== Pennsylvania ===
- Pennsylvania's 3rd congressional district
- Pennsylvania House of Representatives, District 3
- Pennsylvania Senate, District 3

=== South Carolina ===
- South Carolina's 3rd congressional district

=== Tennessee ===
- Tennessee's 3rd congressional district
- Tennessee's 3rd Senate district

=== Texas ===
- Texas's 3rd congressional district
- Texas House of Representatives, District 3
- Texas Senate, District 3

=== Utah ===
- Utah's 3rd congressional district
- Utah's 3rd State Senate district

=== Virginia ===
- Virginia's 3rd congressional district
- Virginia's 3rd Senate district
- Virginia's 3rd House of Delegates district

=== Washington State ===
- Washington's 3rd congressional district

=== West Virginia ===
- West Virginia's 3rd congressional district
- West Virginia's 3rd Senate district

=== Wisconsin ===
- Wisconsin's 3rd congressional district
- Wisconsin Senate, District 3
- 3rd District of the Wisconsin Assembly

=== Other ===
- 3rd District of Columbia Infantry Battalion

== See also ==
- District 3 (disambiguation)
