= 2016 Biñan local elections =

2016 Philippine local election

2016 Biñan mayoral election
- May 9, 2016
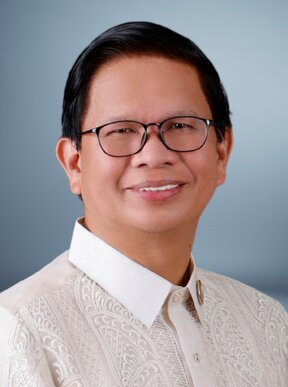
Nominee	Arman Dimaguila	Cookie Yatco	Boy Perez
Party	Liberal	NPC	PMP
Running mate	Gel Alonte	Bobet Borja	N/A
Popular vote	64,262	37,161	21,301
Percentage	52.4	30.3	17.4
Mayor before election
Marlyn "Len-Len" Alonte
Liberal
Elected mayor
Arman Dimaguila
Liberal

Local elections were held in Biñan on May 9, 2016, within the Philippine general election. The voters elected for the elective local posts in the city: the representative, mayor, vice mayor, the two provincial board members for Laguna and twelve councilors.

== Overview ==
Incumbent Mayor Marlyn "Len-Len" Alonte-Naguiat is term-limited, she run unopposed as a representative of the newly created Lone District of Biñan the Liberal Party. Incumbent Vice Mayor Walfredo Dimaguila, Jr. is the party's nominee for Mayor. His opponents are former Mayor Hermis Perez and Cookie Yatco. Incumbent councilor Gel Alonte is running for Vice Mayor against Bobet Borja.

== Candidates ==
=== Administration ticket ===
LA Barkada
Name	Party	Result
For House Of Representative
Len Alonte-Naguiat	Liberal	Won
For Mayor
Arman Dimaguila	Liberal	Won
For Vice Mayor
Gel Alonte	Liberal	Won
For Councilor
Bong Bejasa	Liberal	Won
Liza Cardeño	Liberal	Won
Ramon Carrillo	Liberal	Won
Echit Desuasido	Liberal	Won
Alvin Garcia	Liberal	Won
Andres Marfil	Liberal	Lost
Jigcy Pecaña	Liberal	Won
Dada Reyes	Liberal	Won
Gener Romantigue	Liberal	Won
Jaime Salandanan	Liberal	Won
Eric Sotelo	Liberal	Lost
Jay Souza	Liberal	Won

== Results ==
=== Representative ===
2016 Philippine House of Representatives election in Biñan
Party	Candidate	Votes	%
Liberal	Marlyn Alonte-Naguiat	88,773	100.00
Total votes		88,773	100.00
Liberal hold			

=== Mayor ===
Biñan Mayoral election
Party	Candidate	Votes	%
Liberal	Arman Dimaguila	64,262	52.40
NPC	Cookie Yatco	37,161	30.30
PMP	Boy Perez	21,301	17.40
Total votes		122,724	100.00

=== Vice Mayor ===
Biñan Vice Mayoral election
Party	Candidate	Votes	%
Liberal	Gel Alonte	77,672	68.90
NPC	Bobet Borja	35,018	31.10
Total votes		112,690	100.00

=== Councilors ===
Biñan council election
Party	Candidate	Votes	%
Liberal	Liza Cardeño	69,163	
Liberal	Dada Reyes	67,810	
Liberal	Bong Bejasa	67,527	
PMP	Hershey Tan-Gana	58,544	
NPC	Donna Yatco	56,075	
Liberal	Gener Romantigue	55,915	
Liberal	Jaime Salandanan	54,756	
Liberal	Jay Souza	52,738	
Liberal	Alvin Garcia	51,110	
Liberal	Echit Desuasido	49,719	
Liberal	Jigcy Pecaña	44,568	
Liberal	Ramon Carrillo	44,133	
PMP	Gat Alatiit	41,787	
PMP	Jerwin Lopez	38,884	
NPC	Pol Alzona	37,269	
Liberal	Andres Marfil	36,807	
PMP	Boni Lao	27,997	
PMP	Randy Dimaranan	27,587	
Liberal	Eric Sotelo	27,107	
NPC	Jedi Alatiit	26,016	
NPC	Jun Alonte	23,070	
NPC	Fatima "Faith" Sanchez	22,136	
NPC	Jolo Cardeño	19,297	
PMP	Cinin Almazora	18,495	
PMP	Fe Lopez De Leon	18,218	
NPC	Jenny Manabat	16,220	
NPC	JB Gajita	15,296	
NPC	Erich Fernandez	14,488	
NPC	Jojo Esta	10,246	
PMP	Mario Cardama	9,979	
PMP	Santa Catarina Garcia	8,727	
NPC	Rina Bartolome	8,699	
PMP	Sammy Abarrientos	6,715	
PMP	Marcelino Sigue	6,144	
Total votes		1,133,242	100.00
