= 2019 Biñan local elections =

Philippine election

2019 Biñan mayoral election
- May 13, 2019
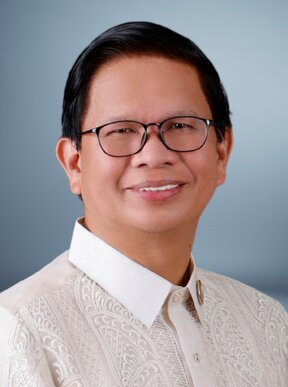
Nominee	Arman Dimaguila	Donna Yatco
Party	PDP–Laban	PDDS
Running mate	Angelo Alonte
Popular vote	67,674	57,662
Percentage	53.99	46.01
Mayor before election
Arman Dimaguila
Liberal
Elected mayor
Arman Dimaguila
PDP–Laban

Local elections were held in Biñan on May 13, 2019, during the Philippine general election. The voters elected for the elective local posts in the city: the representative, mayor, vice mayor, the two provincial board members for Laguna, and twelve councilors.

== Candidates ==
=== Administration ticket ===
LA Barkada
Name	Party	Result
For House Of Representative
Len Alonte-Naguiat	PDP–Laban	Won
For Mayor
Arman Dimaguila	PDP–Laban	Won
For Vice Mayor
Gel Alonte	PDP–Laban	Won
For Councilor
Jedi Alatiit	PDP–Laban	Won
EM Arzola	PDP–Laban	Lost
Bong Bejasa	PDP–Laban	Won
Liza Cardeño	PDP–Laban	Won
Rommel Dicdican	PDP–Laban	Won
Elmer Dimaranan	PDP–Laban	Won
Echit Desuasido	PDP–Laban	Lost
Alvin Garcia	PDP–Laban	Won
Jigcy Pecaña	PDP–Laban	Won
Dada Reyes	PDP–Laban	Won
Gener Romantigue	PDP–Laban	Won
Jay Souza	PDP–Laban	Won

=== Representative ===
2019 Philippine House of Representatives election in Biñan
Party	Candidate	Votes	%
PDP–Laban	Marlyn Alonte-Naguiat	95,435	83.75
PDDS	Crispulo Antonio	18,515	16.25
Total votes		113,950	100.00
PDP–Laban gain from Liberal			

=== Mayor ===
Biñan Mayoral election
Party	Candidate	Votes	%
PDP–Laban	Arman Dimaguila	67,674	53.99
PDDS	Donna Angela Yatco	57,662	46.01
Total votes		125,336	100.00

=== Vice Mayor ===
Biñan Vice Mayoral election
Party	Candidate	Votes	%
PDP–Laban	Angelo Alonte	92,422	100.00
Total votes		92,422	100.00

=== Councilors ===
Biñan council election
Party	Candidate	Votes	%
PDP–Laban	Jonalina Reyes	83,434	7.84
PDP–Laban	Liza Cardeño	77,228	7.26
PDP–Laban	Wilfredo Bejasa, Jr.	76,817	7.22
PDP–Laban	Geronimo Romantigue	73,056	6.86
Nacionalista	Mariz Lindsey Tan Gana - Carait	70,689	6.64
PDP–Laban	Alvin Garcia	70,161	6.59
PDP–Laban	Libunero Alatiit	67,838	6.37
PDP–Laban	Jayson Souza	66,737	6.27
NPC	Jose Francisco Ruben Yatco	66,419	6.24
PDP–Laban	Elmario Dimaranan	66,069	6.21
PDP–Laban	Flaviano Pecaña, Jr.	65,450	6.15
PDP–Laban	Rommel Dicdican	65,418	6.15
PDP–Laban	Alexis Desuasido	61,718	5.80
PFP	Joaquin Borja	57,204	5.38
PDP–Laban	Matthew Mervin Arzola	39,047	3.67
Aksyon	Francis Loyola	22,668	2.13
PDP–Laban	Sammy Abarrientos	17,225	1.62
Independent	Luigi Biraogo	16,997	1.60
Total votes		1,064,236	100.00
