= Sector 3 =

Sector 3, Sector III or variants may refer to:

== Municipal sectors ==
- Sector 3 (Bucharest), an administrative sector of Bucharest, Romania
- A sector of Dwarka Sub City, Delhi, India
- A sector of Rohini Sub City, Delhi, India
- A sector of Vashi, India
- Sector III, a neighbourhood in Getafe, Spain

== Military sectors ==
- A sector of the United Nations Mission in Liberia
- A defence sector of the Bangladesh Armed Forces

== Air traffic sectors ==
- Part of a holding pattern
- A sector of Anchorage Air Route Traffic Control Center coverage area
- A sector of London Area Control Centre coverage area

== Other uses ==
- "Sector 3", a 1996 single by Ed Rush
- Sector3 Studios, a Swedish video game developer

== See also ==
- Sector (disambiguation)
- Third sector (disambiguation)
- District 3 (disambiguation)
- Area 3 (disambiguation)
