= Adrian Jay Advincula =

Filipino politician (born 1993)

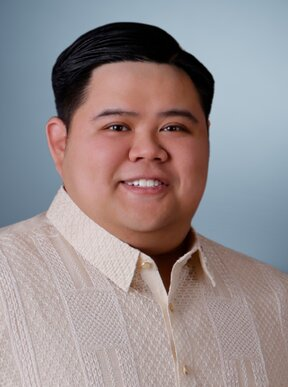
- Official portrait, 2025

Deputy Majority Leader of the House of Representatives of the Philippines
- Incumbent
- Assumed office August 11, 2025

Member of the House of Representatives from Cavite's 3rd district
- Incumbent
- Assumed office June 30, 2022
- Preceded by: Alex Advincula

Member of the Imus City Council
- In office June 30, 2019 – June 30, 2022

Personal details
- Born: Adrian Jay Caguicla Advincula; October 20, 1993 (age 32) Imus, Cavite, Philippines
- Party: NUP (2021–present)
- Other political affiliations: PDP-Laban (2018–2021)
- Education: De La Salle–College of Saint Benilde (BSBA in Export Management)
- Profession: Politician

Adrian Jay Caguicla Advincula (born October 20, 1993), known professionally as AJ Advincula, is a Filipino politician currently serving as the representative of Cavite's 3rd congressional district in the House of Representatives of the Philippines. He is on his second term, having first been elected in 2022 to succeed his father, Alex Advincula, who was term-limited and later became mayor of Imus. He is currently serving as Deputy Majority Leader of the 20th Congress of the Philippines of the House of Representatives of the Philippines since August 11, 2025.

== Early life and education ==
Advincula was born on October 20, 1993. He earned his degree of Bachelor of Science in Business Administration, major in Export Management, from the De La Salle–College of Saint Benilde.

== Political career ==
Before joining Congress, Advincula served as a councilor of Imus from 2019 to 2022.

He was elected as representative of Cavite's 3rd District in 2022. He ran unopposed in the congressional race, succeeding his father, Alex “AA” Advincula, who had served three consecutive terms as congressman.

== Legislative work ==
Among the bills he has authored are:

- A bill transferring the supervision of the Ospital ng Imus from the local government to the Department of Health.
- A bill integrating a comprehensive study of Philippine history during World War II into higher education curriculum.
- A bill mandating toll operators of all major expressways to use a unified RFID collection system.

He also co-authored the bill creating the Maharlika Investment Fund.

In 2024, Advincula voted against the absolute divorce bill. In the same year, he opened an extension office in Imus.

== Personal life ==
He is the son of Alex “AA” Advincula, former congressman and current mayor of Imus.

== Electoral history ==
Electoral history of Adrian Jay Advincula
Year	Office	Party	Votes received				Result
Year	Office	Party	Total	%	P.	Swing	Result
2019	Councilor of Imus	PDP-Laban	107,057	—N/a	1st	—N/a	Won
2022	Representative (Cavite–3rd)	NUP	154,292	100.00%	1st	—N/a	Unopposed
2025	Representative (Cavite–3rd)	NUP	98,072	53.10%	1st	—N/a	Won

== See also ==
- House of Representatives of the Philippines
- List of members of the House of Representatives of the Philippines
