= Biñan's at-large congressional district =

House of Representatives of the Philippines legislative district

- Constituency for the House of Representatives of the Philippines
- Interactive map of district boundaries
- City: Biñan
- Province: Laguna
- Population: 407,437 (2020)
- Electorate: 227,474 (2025)
- Major settlements: Biñan
- Area: 43.50 km^{2} (16.80 sq mi)

Current constituency
- Created: 2015
- Representative: Arman Dimaguila
- Political party: PFP
- Congressional bloc: Majority

Biñan's at-large congressional district is the congressional district of the Philippines in Biñan. It has been represented in the House of Representatives of the Philippines since 2016. Previously included in Laguna's 1st congressional district, it includes all barangays of the city. It is currently represented in the 20th Congress by Walfredo "Arman" Dimaguila Jr. of the Lakas–CMD.

== Representation history ==
#	Member		Term of office		Congress	Party	Electoral history
#	Image	Name	Start	End	Congress	Party	Electoral history
District created March 25, 2015 from Laguna's 1st district.
1		Len Alonte (born 1974)	June 30, 2016	June 30, 2025	17th	Liberal	Elected in 2016.
1		Len Alonte (born 1974)	June 30, 2016	June 30, 2025	18th	PDP–Laban	Re-elected in 2019.
1		Len Alonte (born 1974)	June 30, 2016	June 30, 2025	19th	Lakas	Re-elected in 2022.
2		Arman Dimaguila (born 1971)	June 30, 2025	Incumbent	20th	Lakas	Elected in 2025.
2		Arman Dimaguila (born 1971)	June 30, 2025	Incumbent	20th	PFP	Elected in 2025.

== Election results ==
=== 2016 ===
2016 Philippine House of Representatives election in Biñan's Lone District
Party	Candidate	Votes	%
Liberal	Marlyn Alonte-Naguiat	88,773	68.04
Invalid or blank votes		41,704	31.96
Total votes		130,477	100.00
Liberal win (new seat)			

=== 2019 ===
2019 Philippine House of Representatives election in the Biñan's lone district
Party	Candidate	Votes	%
PDP–Laban	Marlyn Alonte-Naguiat	95,435	83.75
PDDS	Cris Antonio	18,515	16.24
Valid ballots		113,950	87.22
Invalid or blank votes		16,701	12.78
Total votes		130,651	100.00
PDP–Laban hold			

=== 2022 ===
2022 Philippine House of Representatives election in the Biñan's lone district
Party	Candidate	Votes	%
PDP–Laban	Marlyn Alonte-Naguiat	116,376	69.68
PFP	Mike Yatco	50,627	30.23
Valid ballots		167,003	94.61
Invalid or blank votes		9,522	5.39
Total votes		176,525	100.00
PDP–Laban hold			

=== 2025 ===
2025 Philippine House of Representatives election in Biñan's lone district
Party	Candidate	Votes	%
Lakas	Arman Dimaguila	102,049	62.62%
PFP	Mike Yatco	60,922	37.38%
Total votes		162,971	100%
Lakas hold			

== See also ==
- Legislative district of Biñan
