= District 3 =

District 3 can refer to:

== Arts and entertainment ==
- District3 (formerly GMD3), a three-piece harmony boy band on the ninth UK series of The X Factor
- District 3 (The Hunger Games), a fictional district in the Hunger Games books and films

== Places ==
- III District, Turku, in Finland
- District 3 (New York City Council), in the United States
- District 3, Düsseldorf, in Germany
- District 3, Grand Bassa County, in Liberia
- District 3, Ho Chi Minh City, in Vietnam
- District 3, Malta, an electoral district of Malta
- District 3, Malta, a police district of Malta
- District 3, Tehran, a district of the city of Tehran, Iran
- Wiedikon, also known as District 3, in Zürich, Switzerland

== See also ==
- District 3 Innovation Centre, a startup incubator and innovation hub in Concordia University, Montreal, Canada
- District 13 (disambiguation)
- Sector 3 (disambiguation)
- 3rd district (disambiguation)
