= Third sector =

Third sector may refer to:

- Voluntary sector, the economic sector consisting of non-governmental organizations and other non-profit organizations
- Public–private partnership, a company jointly owned by government and private interests
- Third Sector (magazine), a British magazine

== See also ==
- Sector 3 (disambiguation)
- Tertiary sector of the economy
