= Gel Alonte =

Filipino politician (born 1976)

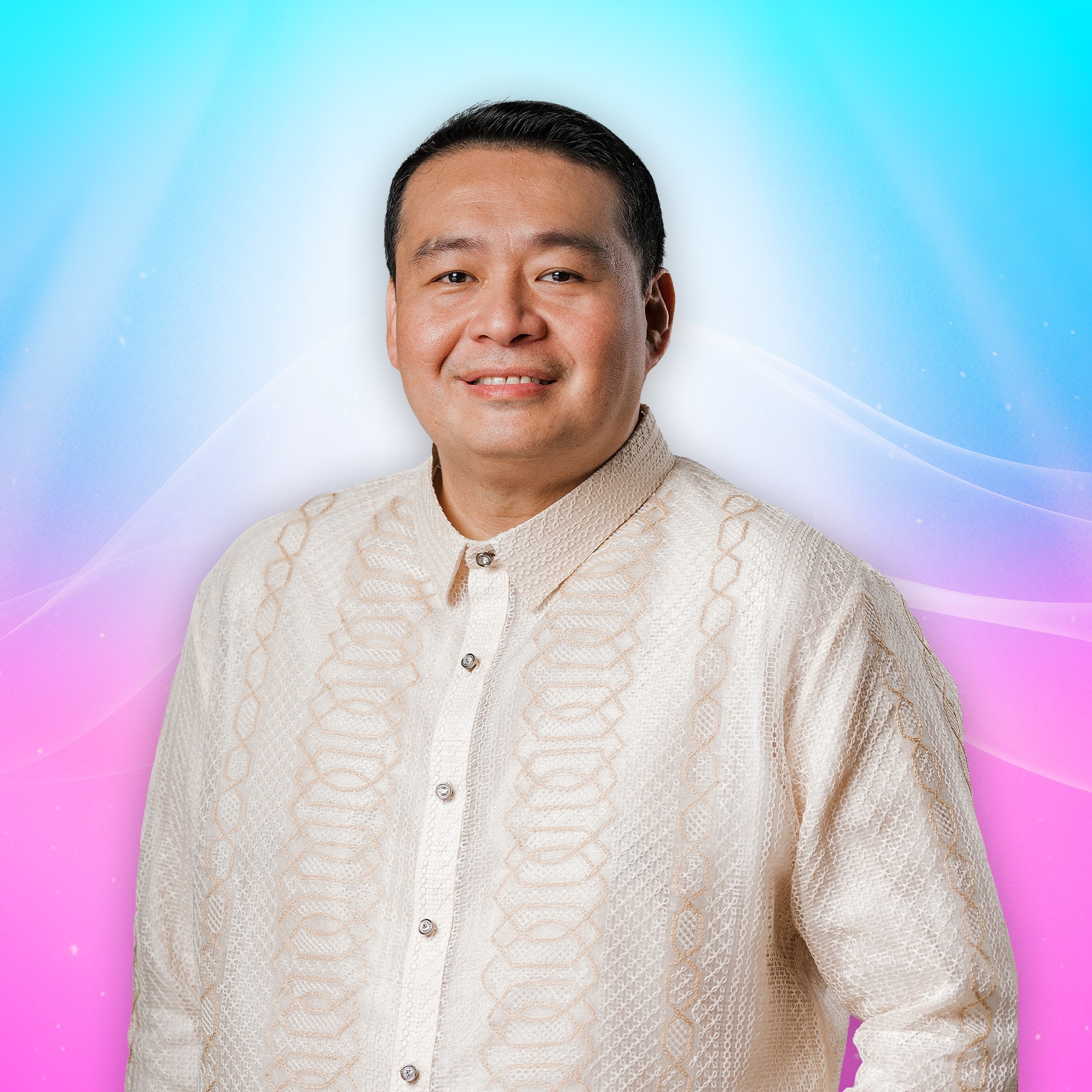
- Official portrait, 2025

29th Mayor of Biñan
- Incumbent
- Assumed office June 30, 2025
- Vice Mayor: Jonalina Reyes
- Preceded by: Arman Dimaguila

Vice Mayor of Biñan
- In office June 30, 2016 – June 30, 2025
- Mayor: Arman Dimaguila
- Preceded by: Arman Dimaguila
- Succeeded by: Jonalina Reyes

Member of Biñan City Council
- In office June 30, 2013 – June 30, 2016

Personal details
- Born: Angelo Belizario Alonte; January 10, 1976 (age 50) Quezon City, Philippines
- Party: NUP (2024–present)
- Other political affiliations: PDP–Laban (2016–2024); Liberal (2012–2016)
- Spouse: Jhozalyn Manego
- Children: 3, including Gela
- Relatives: Len Alonte (sister); Ronnie Alonte (first cousin once removed)
- Occupation: Politician

Angelo "Gel" Belizario Alonte (born January 10, 1976) is a Filipino politician, businessman, and sports executive. He is currently serving as the 29th mayor of Biñan since 2025. He previously served as the vice mayor of Biñan from 2016 to 2025 and had served as a city councilor from 2013 to 2016. He is also one of the owners of Biñan Tatak Gel, his namesake basketball team that competes in the Maharlika Pilipinas Basketball League and Pilipinas Super League.

== Early life and education ==
Alonte was born on January 10, 1976, in Quezon City, and is the fourth child of Bayani Arthur Alonte, who served as mayor of Biñan from 1988 to 1992, and Fe Erlinda Francisco Belizario, the daughter of philanthropist Dr. Ildefonso Belizario. He attended St. Anthony School of Biñan for his primary education. He attended Santa Catalina School for his high school education. He finished with the degree of Bachelor of Science in Respiratory Therapy at the University of Perpetual Help System Laguna–Biñan campus, where he graduated in 1997. After which, he built a construction business.

== Political career ==
Alonte was elected city councilor of Biñan in 2013, top notching the race. As councilor, he was the chairperson of the Committee on Youth and Sports Development. He served for one term until 2016.

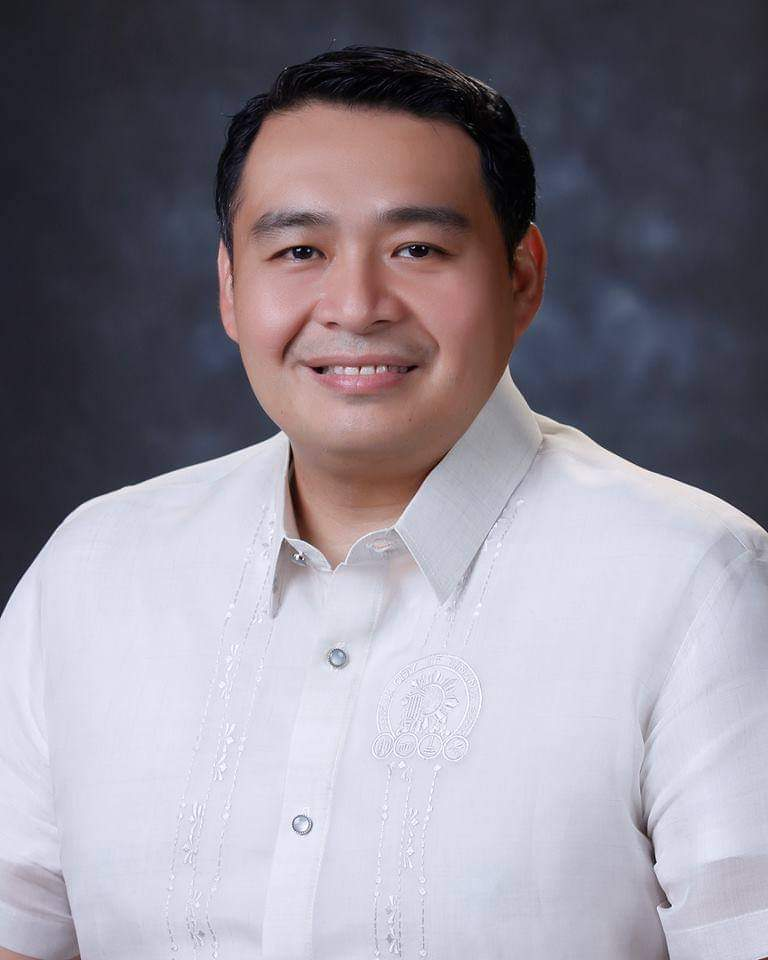
Portrait of Alonte during his term as vice mayor of Biñan

In 2016, Alonte was elected vice mayor of Biñan and served for three consecutive terms until 2025. In all three elections, he was the running mate of his predecessor Arman Dimaguila, who had served as mayor of Biñan also from 2016 to 2025.

In 2025, Alonte became a mayor of Biñan, after beating closest rival Cookie Yatco by over 51,084 votes.

== Sports ==
Alonte is a co-owner of Biñan Tatak Gel, a basketball team that competes in the Maharlika Pilipinas Basketball League and joined the Pilipinas Super League when it was renamed after him in 2023. He was named as the 2025 MPBL Executive of the Year.

== Personal life ==
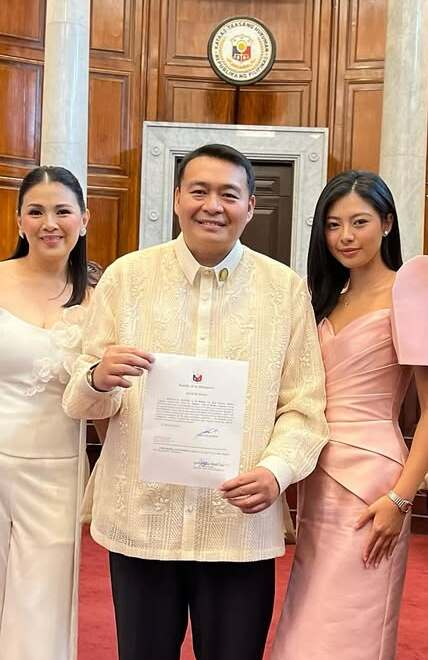
Alonte (center) with his wife Jhozalyn (left) and daughter Gela (right) during his oath-taking as mayor at the Supreme Court in 2025

Alonte is married to Jhozalyn Manego and has three children, including Gela Alonte, an actress. His sister Len Alonte is also a former mayor and representative from Biñan.

== Electoral history ==
Electoral history of Gel Alonte
Year	Office	Party	Votes received				Result
Year	Office	Party	Total	%	P.	Swing	Result
2013	Councilor of Biñan	Liberal	21,829	8.38%	1st	—N/a	Won
2016	Vice Mayor of Biñan	Liberal	77,672	68.90%	1st	—N/a	Won
2019	Vice Mayor of Biñan	PDP–Laban	92,422	100.00%	1st	+31.1%	Unopposed
2022	Vice Mayor of Biñan	PDP–Laban	125,422	82.59%	1st	-17.41%	Won
2025	Mayor of Biñan	NUP	107,746	65.54%	1st	—N/a	Won
