= California's 3rd district =

California's 3rd district may refer to:

- California's 3rd congressional district
- California's 3rd State Assembly district
- California's 3rd State Senate district
