= Area 3 =

Area 3 can refer to:

- Area 3 (Nevada National Security Site)
- Postcentral gyrus, also known as Brodmann area 3
