= Cavite's 3rd congressional district =

Legislative district of the Philippines

- Constituency for the House of Representatives of the Philippines
- Boundary of Cavite's 3rd congressional district in Cavite
- Location of Cavite within the Philippines

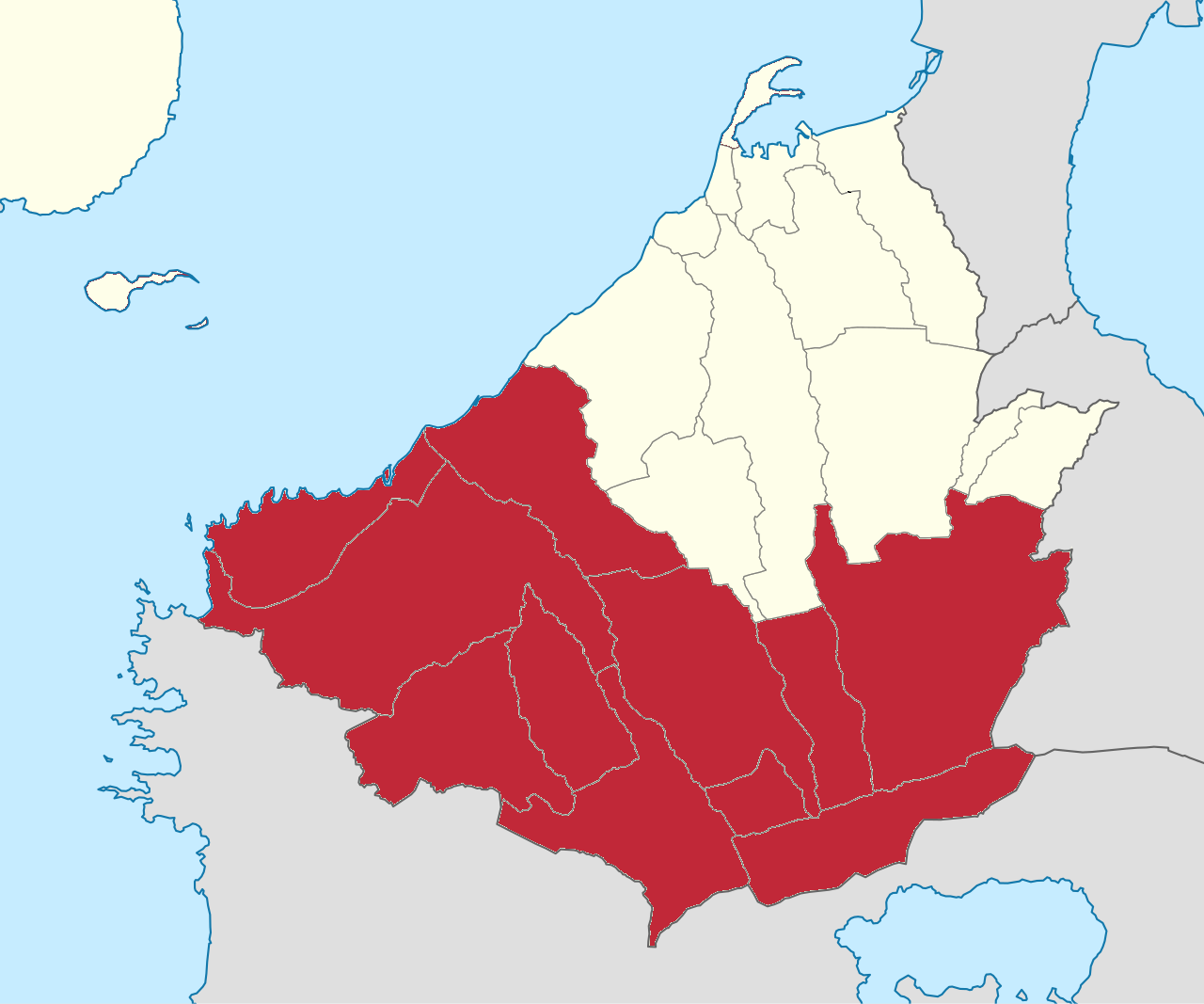
- District boundaries, 1987-2010
- Province: Cavite
- Region: Calabarzon
- Population: 496,794 (2020)
- Electorate: 238,853 (2025)
- Major settlements: Imus
- Area: 64.70 km^{2} (24.98 sq mi)

Current constituency
- Created: 1987
- Representative: Adrian Jay Advincula
- Political party: NUP
- Congressional bloc: Majority

Cavite's 3rd congressional district is one of the eight congressional districts of the Philippines in the province of Cavite. It has been represented in the House of Representatives of the Philippines since 1987. The district is composed of the city of Imus. It is currently represented in the 20th Congress by Adrian Jay Advincula of the National Unity Party (NUP).

The third district previously encompassed the city of Tagaytay and the adjacent southern Cavite municipalities of Alfonso, Amadeo, General Emilio Aguinaldo, Indang, Magallanes, Maragondon, Mendez, Naic, Silang, and Ternate until the reapportionment took effect in 2010.

== Representation history ==
#	Image	Member	Term of office		Congress	Party	Electoral history	Constituent LGUs
#	Image	Member	Start	End	Congress	Party	Electoral history	Constituent LGUs
=== Cavite's 3rd district for the House of Representatives of the Philippines ===
District created February 2, 1987.
1		Jorge A. Nuñez	June 30, 1987	June 30, 1992	8th	KBL (Magdalo)	Elected in 1987.	1987–2010; Alfonso, Amadeo, General Emilio Aguinaldo, Indang, Magallanes, Maragondon, Mendez, Naic, Silang, Tagaytay, Ternate
1		Jorge A. Nuñez	June 30, 1987	June 30, 1992	8th	Nacionalista (Magdalo)	Elected in 1987.	1987–2010; Alfonso, Amadeo, General Emilio Aguinaldo, Indang, Magallanes, Maragondon, Mendez, Naic, Silang, Tagaytay, Ternate
2		Telesforo A. Unas	June 30, 1992	June 30, 1998	9th	LDP	Elected in 1992.	1987–2010; Alfonso, Amadeo, General Emilio Aguinaldo, Indang, Magallanes, Maragondon, Mendez, Naic, Silang, Tagaytay, Ternate
2		Telesforo A. Unas	June 30, 1992	June 30, 1998	10th	LDP	Re-elected in 1995.	1987–2010; Alfonso, Amadeo, General Emilio Aguinaldo, Indang, Magallanes, Maragondon, Mendez, Naic, Silang, Tagaytay, Ternate
3		Napoleon R. Beratio	June 30, 1998	August 6, 2002	11th	LAMMP	Elected in 1998.	1987–2010; Alfonso, Amadeo, General Emilio Aguinaldo, Indang, Magallanes, Maragondon, Mendez, Naic, Silang, Tagaytay, Ternate
3		Napoleon R. Beratio	June 30, 1998	August 6, 2002	12th	LDP	Re-elected in 2001. Died.	1987–2010; Alfonso, Amadeo, General Emilio Aguinaldo, Indang, Magallanes, Maragondon, Mendez, Naic, Silang, Tagaytay, Ternate
–	vacant		August 6, 2002	June 30, 2004	12th	No special election held to fill vacancy.		1987–2010; Alfonso, Amadeo, General Emilio Aguinaldo, Indang, Magallanes, Maragondon, Mendez, Naic, Silang, Tagaytay, Ternate
4		Jesus Crispin Remulla	June 30, 2004	June 30, 2010	13th	Nacionalista (Magdalo)	Elected in 2004.	1987–2010; Alfonso, Amadeo, General Emilio Aguinaldo, Indang, Magallanes, Maragondon, Mendez, Naic, Silang, Tagaytay, Ternate
4		Jesus Crispin Remulla	June 30, 2004	June 30, 2010	14th	Nacionalista (Magdalo)	Re-elected in 2007. Redistricted to the 7th district.	1987–2010; Alfonso, Amadeo, General Emilio Aguinaldo, Indang, Magallanes, Maragondon, Mendez, Naic, Silang, Tagaytay, Ternate
5		Erineo S. Maliksi	June 30, 2010	June 30, 2013	15th	Liberal (Magdalo)	Elected in 2010.	2010–present Imus
6		Alex L. Advincula	June 30, 2013	June 30, 2022	16th	Liberal	Elected in 2013.	2010–present Imus
6		Alex L. Advincula	June 30, 2013	June 30, 2022	17th	PDP–Laban	Re-elected in 2016.	2010–present Imus
6		Alex L. Advincula	June 30, 2013	June 30, 2022	18th	NUP	Re-elected in 2019.	2010–present Imus
7		Adrian Jay C. Advincula	June 30, 2022	Incumbent	19th	NUP	Elected in 2022.	2010–present Imus
7		Adrian Jay C. Advincula	June 30, 2022	Incumbent	20th	NUP	Re-elected in 2025.	2010–present Imus

== Election results ==
=== 2025 ===
2025 Philippine House of Representatives election in Cavite's 3rd congressional district
Party	Candidate	Votes	%
NUP	AJ Advincula	98,072	53.10
Aksyon	Emmanuel Maliksi	78,916	42.73
WPP	Atty. Marvyn Maristela	7,700	4.17
Total votes		184,688	100
NUP hold			

=== 2022 ===
2022 Philippine House of Representatives election in Cavite's 3rd congressional district
Party	Candidate	Votes	%
NUP	AJ Advincula	154,292	100.00
Total votes		154,292	100%
NUP hold			

=== 2019 ===
2019 Philippine House of Representatives election in Cavite 3rd District.
Party	Candidate	Votes	%
PDP–Laban	Alex Advincula	116,944	100%
Total votes		116,944	100%
PDP–Laban hold			

=== 2016 ===
2016 Philippine House of Representatives election in Cavite 3rd District.
Party	Candidate	Votes	%
Liberal	Alex Advincula	106,268	79.26
Invalid or blank votes		26,699	20.74
Total votes		135,967	100.00
Liberal hold			

=== 2013 ===
2013 Philippine House of Representatives election at Cavite's 3rd district
Party	Candidate	Votes	%
Liberal	Alex Advincula	57,141	59.81
Lakas	Albert Villasecca	28,759	30.10
Independent	Eleazar Salon	743	0.78
Margin of victory		28,382	29.71%
Invalid or blank votes		8,887	9.30
Total votes		95,530	100.00
Liberal hold			

=== 2010 ===
Candidate	Party	Votes	%
Ayong Maliksi	Liberal Party	55,961	63.71
Albert Villaseca	Lakas–Kampi–CMD	28,651	32.62
Nelia Servida	Independent	2,398	2.73
Eric Cerojano	Kilusang Bagong Lipunan	831	0.95
Total		87,841	100.00
Valid votes		87,841	94.14
Invalid/blank votes		5,468	5.86
Total votes		93,309	100.00
Liberal Party gain from Nacionalista Party			
Source: Commission on Elections

== See also ==
- Legislative districts of Cavite
