= Polytechnic University of the Philippines Biñan =

Public university in Laguna, Philippines

Polytechnic University of the Philippines Biñan Campus
- Politeknikong Unibersidad ng Pilipinas sa Biñan (Filipino)
- Motto: Tanglaw ng Bayan
- Type: State University, Public University
- Established: 2010
- Director: Dir. Josefina B. Macarubbo
- Location: Biñan, Laguna, Philippines; 14°18′49″N 121°04′42″E
- University hymn: Imno ng PUP
- Colors: Maroon and Gold
- Website: www.pup.edu.ph

- Location in Laguna Location in Luzon Location in the Philippines

Polytechnic University of the Philippines, Biñan, or PUP Biñan (Filipino: Politeknikong Unibersidad ng Pilipinas, Sudlong ng Biñan), is a PUP campus located in the city of Biñan, Laguna, Philippines, offering eleven (11) course, one (3) diploma program and undergraduate programs.

The campus was created through a memorandum of agreement between the university and the city government of Biñan in 2010.

== Courses ==
College of Accountancy (COA)

- Bachelor of Science in Accountancy (BSA)

College of Computer Management and Information Technology (CCMIT)

- Bachelor of Science in Information Technology (BSIT)

College of Engineering (CE)

- Bachelor of Science in Computer Engineering (BSCpE)
- Bachelor of Science in Industrial Engineering (BSIE)

College of Technology (CT)

- Diploma in Office Management Technology (DOMT)
- Diploma in Computer Engineering Management Technology (DCEMT)
- Diploma in Information Communication Management Technology (DICMT)

College of Business Administration (CBA)

- Bachelor of Science in Business Administration major in Human Resource Management Development (BSBA-HRDM)
