= Arman Dimaguila =

Filipino lawyer and politician

Walfredo R. Dimaguila Jr.
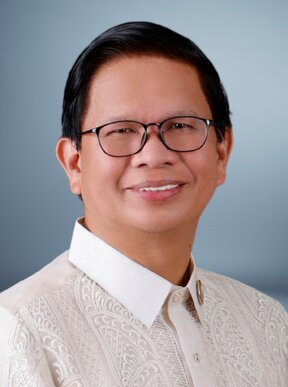
- Official portrait, 2026

Member of the House of Representatives of the Philippines from Biñan's Lone district
- Incumbent
- Assumed office June 30, 2025
- Preceded by: Marlyn Alonte

28th Mayor of Biñan
- In office June 30, 2016 – June 30, 2025
- Vice Mayor: Angelo Alonte
- Preceded by: Marlyn Alonte
- Succeeded by: Angelo Alonte

Vice Mayor of Biñan
- In office June 30, 2007 – June 30, 2016
- Mayor: Marlyn Alonte
- Preceded by: Marlyn Alonte
- Succeeded by: Angelo Alonte

Member of the Biñan Municipal Council
- In office June 30, 2001 – June 30, 2007

Personal details
- Born: Walfredo Reyes Dimaguila Jr. October 9, 1971 (age 54) Biñan, Laguna, Philippines
- Party: PFP (2026–present)
- Other political affiliations: Lakas (2003–2006; 2009–2012; 2024–2026); PDP (2018–2024); Liberal (2012–2018); UNO (2006–2009); NPC (2000–2003)
- Spouse: Lourdes Dimaguila
- Education: Lyceum of the Philippines University
- Profession: Lawyer, Politician
- Nickname: Arman

Walfredo "Arman" Reyes Dimaguila Jr. (born October 9, 1971) is a Filipino lawyer, educator, and politician. He is the incumbent representative of the lone district of Biñan, Laguna, having assumed office on June 30, 2025. He previously served as mayor of Biñan from 2016 to 2025.

== Early life and education ==
Dimaguila was born in Biñan, Laguna on October 9, 1971, the sixth of ten children of Walfredo Dimaguila Sr., a municipal electrician, and Feliciana Reyes, a laundrywoman.

Dimaguila studied at Malaban Elementary School for his primary education until 1985, where he was a valedictorian. He later transferred from Lake Shore Educational Institution to St. Anthony’s School for his secondary education. He completed his undergraduate degree at the Lyceum of the Philippines University, where he graduated cum laude in 1993. To finance his studies, he worked as a bread vendor and later as a security guard.

He pursued law at Lyceum while working at the National Tax Research Center of the Department of Finance, eventually passing the bar examination in 1999.

== Career ==
Dimaguila entered politics when he was elected as a Sangguniang Kabataan chairman of Barangay Malaban, Biñan, in the early 1990s. He was named San Luis Most Outstanding Youth in Laguna in 1993.

Dimaguila practiced as a private lawyer, representing laborers and women, and taught law in several universities. He also engaged in civic programs that supported children in conflict with the law and women who experienced abuse.

=== Councilor of Biñan (2001–2007) ===
Dimaguila later served as municipal councilor of Biñan for two consecutive terms from 2001 to 2007. As councilor, he was credited for a scholarship program that eventually led to the establishment of the Polytechnic University of the Philippines Biñan.

=== Vice Mayor of Biñan (2007–2016) ===
Dimaguila was elected vice mayor of Biñan in 2007, serving for three terms until 2016. It was during his vice mayoral term when Biñan was converted into a city in 2010.

=== Mayor of Biñan (2016–2025) ===
Dimaguila was elected as mayor of Biñan in 2016 and served until 2025. Under his administration, Biñan became a three-time recipient of the Department of the Interior and Local Government’s Seal of Good Local Governance. Among his key projects were the establishment of the Biñan City Command Control and Communication Center (C3), the Eco-Center Materials Recovery Facility program, and the Bahay Pag-asa rehabilitation center for children in conflict with the law.

=== Representative (2025–present) ===
In the 2025 elections, Dimaguila was elected as the second representative of Biñan’s lone legislative district first created in 2016. His predecessor, Len Alonte, was term-limited.

== Personal life ==
Dimaguila is married to Lourdes Dimaguila, who has been actively involved in social welfare programs in Biñan.
