= Len Alonte =

Filipino politician (born 1974)

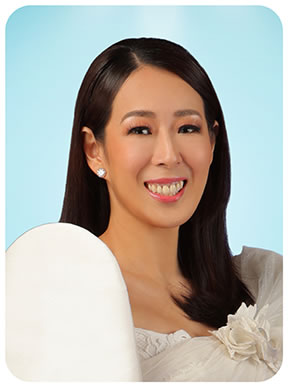
- Official portrait, 2022

Deputy Speaker of the House of Representatives
- In office March 15, 2021 – June 30, 2022
- House Speaker: Lord Allan Velasco

Chairperson of the Philippine House of Representatives Committee on Ecology
- In office August 24, 2022 – June 30, 2025
- Succeeded by: TBD

Member of the Philippine House of Representatives from Biñan's Lone District
- In office June 30, 2016 – June 30, 2025
- Preceded by: Constituency established
- Succeeded by: Arman Dimaguila

27th Mayor of Biñan
- In office June 30, 2007 – June 30, 2016
- Vice Mayor: Arman Dimaguila
- Preceded by: Hermis Perez
- Succeeded by: Arman Dimaguila

Vice Mayor of Biñan
- In office June 30, 2004 – June 30, 2007
- Mayor: Hermis Perez
- Preceded by: Ruben Yatco
- Succeeded by: Arman Dimaguila

Member of the Biñan Municipal Council
- In office June 30, 1998 – June 30, 2004

Personal details
- Born: Marlyn Belizario Alonte; July 15, 1974 (age 52) Biñan, Laguna, Philippines
- Citizenship: Filipino
- Party: Lakas (1997–2000; 2022–present)
- Other political affiliations: PDP–Laban (2016–2022); Liberal (2009-2016); UNO (2006–2009); LDP (2003–2006); NPC (2000–2003)
- Spouse: Steve Naguiat (m. 2003)
- Relations: Ronnie Alonte (first cousin once removed); Gel Alonte (brother); Gela Alonte (niece)
- Children: 2
- Parents: Bayani Arthur Alonte (father); Fe Erlinda Francisco Belizario Alonte (mother)
- Education: University of Santo Tomas (BS)
- Occupation: Politician

Marlyn Belizario "Len" Alonte-Naguiat (born July 15, 1974) is a Filipino politician who served as the Member of the House of Representatives of the Philippines for Biñan from 2016 to 2025. A member of the centre-right Lakas–CMD, she previously served as one of the deputy speakers of the House of Representatives from March 2021 to June 2022, as well as the 3-term Mayor of Biñan from 2007 to 2016, the Vice Mayor of Biñan from 2004 to 2007 and the Member of the then Biñan Municipal Council from 1998 to 2004.

== Political career ==
=== Biñan Municipal Council ===
Her political career began when she was elected as a top member of the Biñan Municipal Council in 1998, at the age of 23. She was re-elected as councilor in 2001.

=== Vice Mayor of Biñan ===
In 2004, she contested for Vice Mayorship of the city, instead of seeking re-election for Councilor, and won.

=== Mayor of Biñan ===
She was elected Mayor of Biñan in 2007. Being 32 years old during the election, she was the youngest and the first female Mayor of the city. During her mayorship, she oversaw the adoption of the new seal of the city, as well as the implementation of a plastic-free policy in order to promote the citizens to use bayong, an environmental-friendly traditional Filipino bag. She also organised the establishment of Polytechnic University of the Philippines Biñan. It was during her term when Biñan was converted into a city on February 2, 2010. She was re-elected in 2010 and in 2013.

=== House of Representatives ===
Formerly a long-term member of the Liberal Party, Alonte joined the centre-left PDP-Laban, the new ruling party, following her election as the representative for Biñan at the 2016 election. She was re-elected under the PDP-Laban ticket at the 2019 election.

On March 25, 2021, Alonte was elected Deputy Speaker of the House of Representatives, making her as the 33rd Deputy Speaker under the speakership of Lord Allan Velasco.

Following her re-election as the Biñan representative at the 2022 election, she left the PDP-Laban and joined the Lakas-CMD, along with 22 others. This movement was referred to as "support of the newly-elected President Bongbong Marcos and the Vice President Sara Duterte" by the party president Martin Romualdez, who was later elected House Speaker.

== Political positions ==
Alonte has been in favor of women and children's rights since her involvement in politics. During her Biñan mayorship, she organised Kababaihan Unlad Biñan, which has been celebrating the Women's Month and holding various activities. She also focused on improving children's education in the city in order to overcome poverty. Ever since being elected representative, she has been contributing for several bills and acts i.e. Republic Act No. 11510, as well as House Bill No. 8097, to enhance the lives of out-of-school youths and single parents.

Alonte is also a supporter of LGBTQ rights. She attended the 2018 Pride Month Celebration organised by the Gay Alliance for Len Alonte.

== Controversies ==
=== Bribery scandal ===
In February 2017, Alonte provoked a controversy when the then Secretary of Justice Vitaliano Aguirre II accused her and a former Senator Jamby Madrigal for providing ₱100 million to several high-class prisoners of the New Bilibid Prison. Several newspapers reported that the bribery was in order to withdraw their testimonies against Senator Leila de Lima.

Nevertheless, netizens criticized Aguirre for simply accusing others without any evidences. Kris Aquino, the younger sister of former President Benigno Aquino III, also defended Alonte, stating that she does not agree with any unproven accusations. Alonte herself also denied the accusation.

=== Vote buying ===
Marlyn Alonte was one of the 3 Biñanense politicians, together with Mayor Arman Dimaguila and Vice Mayor Angelo Alonte, who were accused and sued for alleged vote buying for the 2022 election. According to Manila Bulletin, one of the 3 complainants was Michael Yatco, the former Partido Federal ng Pilipinas candidate for Biñan who was defeated by Alonte.

== Personal life ==
A native Biñanense, Alonte is the daughter of Bayani Arthur Alonte, who served as Mayor of Biñan from 1988 to 1992, and Fe Erlinda Francisco Belizario, the daughter of philanthropist Dr. Ildefonso Belizario. She is the sister of incumbent Biñan Mayor Angelo Alonte. She attended University of Santo Tomas, where she obtained a Bachelor in Tourism degree. She married Steve Naguiat, a cousin of Cristino Naguiat, who formerly served as the Chairman of the Philippine Amusement and Gaming Corporation (PAGCOR). They have 2 children — Nico and Isabel.

She has a close relationship with Kris Aquino.
