= 2022 Philippine House of Representatives elections =

26th Philippine House of Representatives elections

- May 9, 2022
- All 316 seats to the House of Representatives of the Philippines; 159 seats needed for a majority
- Congressional district elections
- All 253 seats from congressional districts
- Turnout: 55,290,821 (84.10% ▲8.20pp)
Party	Vote %	Seats	+/–
PDP–Laban	22.77	66	−16
Nacionalista	13.75	36	−6
NUP	12.66	33	+8
NPC	11.72	35	−2
Lakas	9.22	26	+14
Liberal	3.79	10	−8
PRP	1.96	3	+2
Reporma	0.99	2	+2
PFP	0.95	3	−2
PDDS	0.89	2	+2
LDP	0.78	1	−1
CDP	0.27	1	0
UNA	0.14	1	+1
Others	20.11	34	+22
This lists parties that won seats. See the complete results below.
- Party-list election
- All 63 seats under the party-list system
- Turnout: 56,028,855 (82.98% ▲8.67pp)
Party	Vote %	Seats	+/–
ACT-CIS	5.74	3	0
1-Rider	2.72	2	+2
Tingog	2.41	2	+1
4Ps	2.30	2	+2
Ako Bicol	2.22	2	0
SAGIP	2.12	2	0
Others	50.82	50	+12
This lists parties that won seats. See the complete results below.
Election results; map refers to results from congressional districts, with Metro Manila, parts of Metro Cebu and Metro Davao at the inset, while the boxes to the left represent party-list seats.
Speaker before	Speaker after
Lord Allan Velasco; PDP–Laban	Martin Romualdez; Lakas

The 2022 Philippine House of Representatives elections were the 36th lower house elections in the Philippines, and 26th as House of Representatives. The election of the House of Representatives was held on May 9, 2022.

The election is held concurrently with the 2022 presidential, Senate and local elections. A voter has two votes in the House of Representatives: one for the congressional district, and one for party-list. Parties of leading presidential candidates are expected to stand candidates in many districts. In the outgoing 18th Congress, there are 243 congressional districts.

There are 253 congressional districts for this election, which means 63 seats, or at least 20% of the seats, disputed in the party-list election. The party-list election is done on a nationwide, at-large basis, separate and distinct from the election from the congressional districts.

Allies of presidential-elect Bongbong Marcos won a majority of the seats, with his cousin Martin Romualdez being elected as speaker.

== Background ==
In the 18th Congress of the Philippines, the parties supporting President Rodrigo Duterte disputed the speakership, Alan Peter Cayetano of the Nacionalista Party, Lord Allan Jay Velasco of PDP–Laban, and the National Unity Party's (NUP) Paolo Duterte emerged as the front-runners to be speaker. The president pushed for a term-sharing agreement between Cayetano and Velasco, with Cayetano serving from July 2019 to October 2020, then Velasco serving until 2022. The younger Duterte disapproved of term-sharing, though. Cayetano was elected Speaker in July 2019.

By March 2020, Cayetano allegedly met with representatives from the Nacionalistas and the NUP to consolidate support for his tenure as speaker. This allegedly involved declaring the position of Speaker vacant. and with Cayetano having enough votes to be reelected, override the original agreement in order to remain in position for the rest of the congressional term. Cayetano, when asked about this, said "I cannot predict what's going to happen sa (on the) floor which can happen anytime and any member can make any motion."

Weeks before he was expected to turn over the speakership to Velasco, Cayetano said that Velasco's term should have started in November, as October is the 15th month, and it was brokered that he become speaker for the first 15 months. Aside from the speakership, only one committee chairmanship is expected to change hands, with all other positions unaffected by the change.

In a September 29, 2020 meeting between President Duterte, Cayetano and Velasco, the president asked the representatives to abide by the gentleman's agreement. Velasco rejected Duterte's suggestion to move the term-sharing deal from October to December. On the October 1 session, Cayetano, who attacked Velasco for pushing through with the deal in the middle of the pandemic and while the budget was being tackled offered to resign as speaker, but it was rejected by his allies. A later vote showed that 184 representatives wanted Cayetano to stay as speaker, 1 dissented, and 9 abstained.

At the next week, Congress suspended its session a week earlier than scheduled. At the session Cayetano moved to terminate the period of debates and amendments. After that was approved, another motion was approved for the 2021 budget to be approved on second reading. The session was then suspended until November 16. This meant that session was suspended before the expected transfer of power on October 14. This put the status of the budget in time in doubt. Duterte called on Cayetano and Velasco to settle their differences or else he'll "do it for you". Duterte then called on a special session from October 13 to 16 to pass the budget.

On October 11, pictures of Velasco and Davao City mayor Sara Duterte appeared on the internet, with the presidential daughter giving tacit approval of Velasco's speakership campaign. On October 12, the day before the special session, Velasco and his allies gathered in the Celebrity Sports Plaza in Quezon City to elect new officials of the House of Representatives, including the speakership. Velasco was elected 186–0. Cayetano branded the session as illegal. On the morning of the special session, Velasco allies entered the session hall of the Batasang Pambansa Complex and elected Velasco as speaker in the same 186–0 result. While voting was ongoing, Cayetano resigned as speaker on Facebook live, giving Velasco the speakership undisputedly. Velasco then recalled the budget from second reading, reopening deliberations for it.

After Velasco and his allies consolidated leadership positions in the chamber, Cayetano and six of his allies launched "BTS sa Kongreso", or "Back to service in Congress" in January 2021. Cayetano clarified that his bloc was not named as such, in response to fans of South Korean boy band BTS who called out Cayetano using the name of the boy band for political motives.

== Electoral system ==
The Philippines uses parallel voting for its lower house elections. For this election, there are 316 seats in the House of Representatives; 253 of these are district representatives, and 63 are party-list representatives.

Philippine law mandates that there should be one party-list representative for every four district representatives. District representatives are elected under the first-past-the-post system from single-member districts. Party-list representatives are elected via the nationwide vote with a 2% election threshold, with a party winning not more than three seats. The party with the most votes usually wins three seats, then the other parties with more than 2% of the vote two seats. At this point, if all of the party-list seats are not filled up, the parties with less than 2% of the vote will win one seat each until all party-list seats are filled up. The electoral system, with the 2% threshold and the 3-seat cap, encourage vote splitting; several parties have indeed exploited this, putting up separate party-lists for every sector so as not to waste their vote on just one party.

Political parties competing in the party-list election are barred from participating district elections, and vice versa, unless permitted by the Commission on Elections. Party-lists and political parties participating in the district elections may forge coalition deals with one another.

Campaigning for elections from congressional districts seats are decidedly local; the candidates are most likely a part of an election slate that includes candidates for other positions in the locality, and slates may comprise different parties. The political parties contesting the election make no attempt to create a national campaign.

Party-list campaigning, on the other hand, is done on a national scale. Parties usually attempt to appeal to a specific demographic. Polling is usually conducted for the party-list election, while pollsters may release polls on specific district races. In district elections, pollsters do not attempt to make forecasts on how many votes a party would achieve, nor the number of seats a party would win; they do attempt to do that in party-list elections, though.

== Redistricting ==
In the Philippines, Congress has the power to create new congressional districts. Congress can either redistrict the entire country within three years after each Philippine census, or create new districts from existing ones piecemeal, although Congress has never redistricted the entire country wholesale since the approval of the 1987 constitution. Congress usually creates a new district once a place reaches the minimum 250,000 population mandated by the constitution.

New districts can also be created by creating new provinces and cities; in this case, it also must be approved by the people in a plebiscite in the affected places.

=== Changes from the previous Congress ===
There were originally four new districts that will be first contested in 2022, based from redistricting laws passed by the 17th Congress that were not implemented in time for the 2019 election:

- Division of Southern Leyte's at-large district to two districts
  - Southern Leyte's municipalities to the east of Sogod Bay becomes the 1st district.
  - The municipalities to the west, including Sogod, becomes the 2nd district.
  - Enacted into law as Republic Act No. 11198.
- Division of South Cotabato's 1st district to two districts
  - General Santos becomes the 3rd district.
  - The rest of the 1st district is kept intact.
  - Enacted into law as Republic Act No. 11243.
- Division of Cebu's 6th district to two districts
  - Mandaue becomes its own at-large district
  - The rest of the district (Consolacion and Cordova) remains intact.
  - Enacted into law as Republic Act No. 11257
- Division of Palawan to three provinces
  - Taytay and all municipalities north of it would have been Palawan del Norte and it own at-large district.
  - Municipalities in between Taytay and Puerto Princesa would have been Palawan Oriental and it own at-large district.
  - Municipalities south of Puerto Princesa would have been Palawan del Sur and it own at-large district.
  - Puerto Princesa would have become its own at-large district.
  - Enacted into law as Republic Act No. 11259
  - Defeated in a plebiscite held on March 13, 2021.
- Division of Laguna's 1st district to two districts
  - Santa Rosa, becomes its own at-large district.
  - The rest of the 1st district, San Pedro, remains intact.
  - Enacted into law as Republic Act No. 11395

It will also be the first election for Davao de Oro in that name, after the successful renaming plebiscite in 2019 from "Compostela Valley".

In Palawan, a law was passed dividing it into three provinces, with each province and Puerto Princesa getting a new district each; Palawan and Puerto Princesa together presently has 3 districts. As this means creating new provinces, it had to be approved in a plebiscite before it can be made effective. In the ensuing plebiscite held on March 13, 2021, the voters rejected division, thereby retaining the status quo of three districts shared between Palawan and Puerto Princesa.

=== Changes from the outgoing Congress ===
There are six new districts created by the 18th Congress that have either been signed by President Rodrigo Duterte, or lapsed into law: One repeals the redistricting done by the previous Congress.

- Division of Rizal's 2nd district to three districts
  - Rodriguez becomes the 4th district,
  - San Mateo becomes the 3rd district.
  - The rest of the 2nd district is kept intact.
  - Enacted into law as Republic Act No. 11533
- Division of Caloocan's 1st district to two districts
  - Caloocan's Barangay 178 in Camarin, and the entirety of Tala and Amparo shall become the 3rd district.
  - The rest of the 1st district is kept intact.
  - Enacted into law as Republic Act No. 11545
- Reapportionment of Bulacan excluding San Jose del Monte and the 1st district from three districts to five
  - Baliuag, Bustos and Plaridel becomes the 2nd district.
  - Doña Remedios Trinidad, San Ildefonso, San Miguel and San Rafael becomes the 3rd district.
  - Marilao, Meycauayan and Obando becomes the 4th district.
  - Balagtas, Bocaue, Guiguinto and Pandi becomes the 5th district.
  - Angat, Norzagaray and Santa Maria becomes the 6th district.
  - Enacted into law as Republic Act No. 11546
- Reapportionment of Bataan from two districts to three
  - Bagac and Mariveles from the 2nd district and Dinalupihan and Morong from the 1st district becomes the 3rd district.
  - The rest of the 1st and 2nd districts remain intact.
  - Enacted into law as Republic Act No. 11553
- Division of South Cotabato's 1st and 3rd districts to three districts
  - General Santos, which is the 3rd district, becomes its own at-large district.
  - South Cotabato's 1st district's municipalities not bordering Koronadal becomes the 3rd district.
  - The rest of the 1st district remains intact.
  - Enacted into law as Republic Act No. 11804, repealing Republic Act No. 11243

A law was ratified dividing Maguindanao into two provinces; as Maguindanao now is divided into 2 districts, this does not change the number of districts, but does send Talitay along with the old 1st district to Maguindanao del Norte, while leaving the rest of the old 2nd district as the new Maguindanao del Sur. As this involved creating new provinces, the people must agree on a plebiscite for this to be effective. The law originally scheduled the plebiscite in August 2021, but the Commission on Elections rescheduled the plebiscite to be held after the 2022 election. This means that in Maguindanao, the current appropriation would be used before the province was to be divided.

=== Summary of changes ===
In August 2021, the Commission on Elections set the number of seats to be disputed in the election. As there were 253 districts by that date, that means there will be 63 party-list seats to be disputed as well.

Category	Total
Congressional districts in the current Congress	243
New districts from redistricting laws from previous Congress	4
New districts from redistricting laws from current Congress	6
Congressional districts in the next Congress	253
Party-list seats for the next Congress	63
Total seats for the next Congress	316

== Participating parties ==
In both chambers of Congress, members are organized into "blocs", akin to parliamentary groups elsewhere. In keeping with the traditions of the Third Philippine Republic which was under a two-party system, there are two main blocs, the majority and minority blocs; this is despite the fact that the country is now in a multi-party system. Those who voted for the winning speaker are from the majority bloc, while those who did not (if there are more than two candidates for the speakership) will vote amongst themselves on who will be the minority bloc. Those who belong to neither bloc shall be the independent minority bloc. Members can also be from the independent bloc. Each bloc can have members from multiple parties. Only the majority and minority blocs have voting privileges in committees.

In the present 18th Congress, the majority bloc is seen to be in favor of President Rodrigo Duterte's presidency, while the minority and independent minority blocs are those opposed.

=== Elections in congressional districts ===
Political parties in the Philippines have been described as "temporary political alliances", or argued that there are no parties at all, just "fan clubs of politicians". Party-switching is not uncommon. The dependence of parties on personalities instead of issues is seen as a factor on why this is so.

Party	2019 results		Seats before the election	Bloc membership			Ideology	Political spectrum
Party	Votes	Seat(s)	Seats before the election	Majority	Minority	Other	Ideology	Political spectrum
PDP–Laban	31.22%	82 / 304	52 / 304	Most	Some	Some	Social democracy Democratic socialism, Populism, Federalism	Center-left
Nacionalista	16.10%	42 / 304	43 / 304	Most	Some	None	Conservatism, National conservatism, Populism	Center-right
NPC	14.31%	37 / 304	38 / 304	Most	Some	None	Conservatism, Social conservatism	Center-right
NUP	9.51%	25 / 304	33 / 304	Most	Some	None	Social conservatism, Christian democracy	Center-right
Lakas	5.11%	12 / 304	24 / 304	All	None	None	Conservatism, Christian democracy	Centre-right
Liberal	5.73%	18 / 304	12 / 304	Most	Some	None	Liberalism, Social liberalism	Centre to centre-left
Other national parties and independents	11.69%	13 / 304	9 / 304	Most	Some	Some	Varies	Varies
Local parties	6.33%	14 / 304	26 / 304	Most	None	Some	Regionalists and localists	Varies
Vacancy	—N/a	0 / 304	6 / 304	—N/a				
Total congressional districts			243 / 304					

=== Party-list election ===
In party-list elections, parties, usually called as "party-lists" can represent ideological, sectoral or ethnolinguistic interests. These elections have allowed left-wing parties to enter the legislature, such as parties allied with the Makabayan and Akbayan, and right-wing parties such as Magdalo. Other parties represent sectoral interests such as Senior Citizens, who represent the elderly, or regionalists such as Ako Bikol who represent Bicolanos. While envisioned as a tool to allow the marginalized to enter the legislature, it has allowed politicians who had previously run and won in non-party-list elections and landed interests to win under the party-list banner as well. Party-list representatives have also run and won in elections outside the party-list system as well.

The Party-list Coalition has represented party-list interests in Congress starting in 2014. In the 18th Congress, all party-lists, save for those from Makabayan and Magdalo, are members of this group. The Party-list Coalition participate in the election as individual member parties; the component parties of the Makabayan are in coalition with each other. The party-list representatives, save from the Makabayan bloc usually support the policies of the sitting president.

Coalition	Current seats	Bloc membership			Ideology	Political spectrum
Coalition	Current seats	Majority	Minority	Other	Ideology	Political spectrum
Party-list Coalition	54 / 304	Most	Some	Some	Varies	Big tent
Makabayan	6 / 304	None	All	None	National democracy, Progressivism	Left-wing
Magdalo	1 / 304	All	None	None	Conservatism	Right-wing
Total party-list seats	61 / 304					

== Retiring and term-limited incumbents ==
Representatives who have been elected for three consecutive times on regular elections (special elections do not count) are prohibited from running for a fourth consecutive term. Incumbents on their first or second terms may opt to run for other offices.

=== Term-limited incumbents ===
These are incumbents who are on their third consecutive terms and cannot run for re-election but may run for other offices outside the House of Representatives. Term-limited politicians usually run for local offices or swap positions with relatives.

Party	Member	District	Running in this position in 2022	Party nominated (relation)	Refs
Abang Lingkod	Joseph Stephen Paduano	Party-list			
Abono	Conrado Estrella III	Party-list			
AGAP	Rico Geron	Party-list			
Aksyon	Edgar Erice	Caloocan–2nd	Mayor of Caloocan	Jacob Cabochan (not related)	
Bayan Muna	Carlos Isagani Zarate	Party-list	Not nominated nor running in 2022	Bayan Muna's nominees are not related to Zarate.	
Buhay	Lito Atienza	Party-list	Vice President of the Philippines	Buhay's nominees are not related to Atienza.	
BPP	Maria Lourdes Acosta-Alba	Bukidnon–1st		Joeman Alba (husband)	
Lakas	Fredenil Castro	Capiz–2nd	Governor of Capiz	Former representative Jane Castro (wife)	
LDP	Rodrigo Abellanosa	Cebu City–2nd	Not running in 2022	BG Rodrigo Abellanosa (son)	
Liberal	Francis Gerald Abaya	Cavite–1st	Mayor of Kawit, Cavite	Paul Abaya (brother)	
Liberal	Isagani Amatong	Zamboanga del Norte–3rd	Not running in 2022	Ian Amatong (son)	
Liberal	Kit Belmonte	Quezon City–6th	Not running in 2022	None (Note: Kit Belmonte is allied with his cousin, incumbent Quezon City mayor Joy Belmonte (SBP), whose ticket nominated councilor Marivic Co-Pilar (NUP) for representative.)	
Liberal	Josephine Sato	Occidental Mindoro	Governor of Occidental Mindoro	Occidental Mindoro Provincial Board member Philip Ramirez (no relation)	
Mindoro Bago Sarili	Paulino Salvador Leachon	Oriental Mindoro–1st	Governor of Oriental Mindoro	Calapan mayor Arnan Panaligan (not related)	
Nacionalista	Raneo Abu	Batangas–2nd	Not running in 2022	Reina Abu (daughter)	
Nacionalista	Sol Aragones	Laguna–3rd	Governor of Laguna	None (Note: Aragones nominated Laguna Provincial Board member Angelica Alarva who was running under the PROMDI.)	
Nacionalista	Abdulmunir Mundoc Arbison	Sulu–2nd	Not running in 2022	None (Note: Abdulmunir's son, Abdulmunir Arbison Jr., is running under the Lakas–CMD.)	
Nacionalista	Mercedes Cagas	Davao del Sur	Not running in 2022	Davao del Sur vice governor John Tracy Cagas (nephew)	
Nacionalista	Eileen Ermita-Buhain	Batangas–1st	Not running in 2022	Former Philippine Sports Commission chairman Eric Buhain (husband)	
Nacionalista	Jun Chipeco Jr.	Calamba	Not running in 2022	Calamba mayor Timmy Chipeco (son)	
Nacionalista	Lawrence Fortun	Agusan del Norte–1st	Vice mayor of Butuan	Butuan vice mayor Jose Aquino II (not related)	
Nacionalista	Jeffrey Khonghun	Zambales–1st	Mayor of Castillejos. Zambales	Zambales vice governor Jay Khonghun (son)	
Nacionalista	Henry Oaminal	Misamis Occidental–2nd	Governor of Misamis Occidental	Ozamiz mayor Sancho Fernando Oaminal (son)	
Nacionalista	Jose Tejada	Cotabato–3rd	Not running in 2022	Nelda Tejada (wife)	
NPC	Erico Aristotle Aumentado	Bohol–2nd	Governor of Bohol	Vanessa Aumentado (wife)	
NPC	Cheryl Deloso-Montalla	Zambales–2nd	Governor of Zambales	Former Zambales governor Amor Deloso (father)	
NPC	Abdullah Dimaporo	Lanao del Norte–2nd	Not running in 2022	Sittie Aminah Quibranza Dimaporo (daughter)	
NPC	Evelina Escudero	Sorsogon–1st	Not running in 2022	Dette Escudero (daughter)	
NPC	Angelina Tan	Quezon–4th	Governor of Quezon	Mike Tan (son)	
NPC	Noel Villanueva	Tarlac–3rd	Mayor of Concepcion, Tarlac	San Vicente (Concepcion, Tarlac) barangay captain Bong Rivera (no relation)	
NUP	Alex Advincula	Cavite–3rd	Mayor of Imus, Cavite	Imus councilor Adrian Jay Advincula (son)	
NUP	Franz Alvarez	Palawan–1st	Not running in 2022	Former representative Antonio Alvarez (father)	
NUP	Wilfredo Caminero	Cebu–2nd	Mayor of Argao, Cebu	Cebu board member Tata Salvador (not related)	
NUP	Leo Rafael Cueva	Negros Occidental–2nd	Vice mayor of Sagay, Negros Occidental	Sagay mayor Alfredo Marañon III (cousin)	
NUP	Luis Ferrer IV	Cavite–6th	Mayor of General Trias, Cavite	General Trias mayor Antonio Ferrer (brother)	
NUP	Gavini Pancho	Bulacan–2nd	Not running in 2022	Tina Pancho (sister)	
NUP	Abraham Tolentino	Cavite–8th	Mayor of Tagaytay, Cavite	Aniela Tolentino (daughter) (Note: Abraham Tolentino's wife, Tagaytay mayor Agnes Tolentino, withdrew from the race in November 2021 and was substituted by their daughter Aniela.)	
NUP	Juliette Uy	Misamis Oriental–2nd	Governor of Misamis Oriental	Former Misamis Oriental vice governor Julio Uy (husband)	
NUP	Rolando Uy	Cagayan de Oro–1st	Mayor of Cagayan de Oro	Cagayan de Oro vice mayor Kikang Uy (son)	
PDP–Laban	Benjamin Agarao Jr.	Laguna–4th	Mayor of Santa Cruz, Laguna	Laguna board member Jam Agarao (daughter)	
PDP–Laban	Rose Marie Arenas	Pangasinan–3rd	Retiring from politics	Movie and Television Review and Classification Board chairperson Maria Rachel Arenas (daughter)	
PDP–Laban	Ferdinand Hernandez	South Cotabato–2nd	Governor of South Cotabato	Former representative Daisy Avance-Fuentes (not related)	
PDP–Laban	Dulce Ann Hofer	Zamboanga Sibugay–2nd	Governor of Zamboanga Sibugay	Former Zamboanga Sibugay provincial administrator George Hofer II (brother)	
PDP–Laban	Elisa Olga Kho	Masbate–2nd	Vice governor of Masbate	Masbate vice governor Olga Ara Kho (daughter)	
PDP–Laban	Eric Olivarez	Parañaque–1st	Mayor of Parañaque	Parañaque mayor Edwin Olivarez (brother)	
PDP–Laban	Xavier Jesus Romualdo	Camiguin	Governor of Camiguin	Camiguin governor Jurdin Jesus Romualdo (father)	
PDP–Laban	Estrellita Suansing	Nueva Ecija–1st	Not running in 2022	Mika Suansing (daughter)	
PDP–Laban	Lucy Torres	Leyte–4th	Mayor of Ormoc	Ormoc mayor Richard Gomez (husband)	
PDP–Laban	Alfred Vargas	Quezon City–5th	Councilor of Quezon City	Quezon City councilor Patrick Michael Vargas (brother)	
PDP–Laban	Ronaldo Zamora	San Juan	Retiring from politics	Bel Zamora (daughter)	
PRP	Rogelio Neil Roque	Bukidnon–4th	Governor of Bukidnon	Valencia councilor Laarni Lavin-Roque (wife)	

=== Retiring incumbents ===
These were allowed defend their seats, but chose not to:

Party	Member	District	Running in this position in 2022	Party nominated (relation)	Refs
Anakalusugan	Mike Defensor	Party-list	Mayor of Quezon City (Note: Defensor is running under the Partido Federal ng Pilipinas.)		
Ako Bicol	Alfredo Garbin Jr.	Party-list	Mayor of Legazpi, Albay		
Asenso	Yul Servo	Manila–3rd	Vice mayor of Manila	Manila councilor Joel Chua (not related)	
Bayan Muna	Eufemia Cullamat	Party-list	Not nominated nor running in 2022	None of Bayan Muna's nominees are relatives of Cullamat	
BPP	Manuel Zubiri	Bukidnon–3rd	Governor of Bukidnon	Bukidnon governor Jose Maria Zubiri Jr. (father)	
Independent	Alan Peter Cayetano	Taguig–Pateros–1st	Senator	None; running as an independent	
Kabataan Partylist	Sarah Elago	Party-list	Not nominated nor running in 2022	None of Kabataan's nominees are relatives of Elago	
Lakas	Mikey Arroyo	Pampanga–2nd	Not running in 2022	Former speaker Gloria Macapagal Arroyo (mother)	
Lakas	Lorna Bautista-Bandigan	Davao Occidental	Vice governor of Davao Occidental	Davao Occidental governor Claude Bautista (brother)	
Lakas	Ramon Guico III	Pangasinan–5th	Governor of Pangasinan	Binalonan mayor Ramon Guico Jr. (father)	
Lakas	Roger Mercado	Southern Leyte (Note: Southern Leyte's at-large congressional district was split into two districts starting in the 2022 elections. Mercado's wife Luz is running in the 1st district under National Unity Party; furthermore, Mercado himself left office in October 2021 after appointment as Secretary of Public Works and Highways, leaving the seat vacant until the next election.)	Not running in 2022	Luz Mercado (wife)	
Lakas	Wilter Palma II	Zamboanga Sibugay–1st	Governor of Zamboanga Sibugay	Zamboanga Sibugay governor Wilter Palma (father)	
Lakas	Paz Radaza	Lapu-Lapu	Mayor of Lapu-Lapu City	Lapu-Lapu City councilor Michael Dignos (no relation)	
Nacionalista	Ansaruddin Alonto Adiong	Lanao del Sur–1st	Not running in 2022	Member of the Bangsamoro Parliament Ziaur-Rahman Alonto-Adiong (brother)	
Nacionalista	Braeden John Biron	Iloilo–4th	Mayor of Dumangas, Iloilo	Former representative Ferjenel Biron (father)	
Nacionalista	Lani Cayetano	Taguig–2nd	Mayor of Taguig	Taguig councilor Pammy Zamora (not related)	
Nacionalista	Josal Fortuno	Camarines Sur–5th	Not running in 2022	Camarines Sur governor Miguel Luis Villafuerte (not related)	
Nacionalista	Eduardo Gullas	Cebu–1st	Retiring from politics	Rhea Gullas (granddaughter-in-law)	
Nacionalista	Corazon Nuñez Malanyaon	Davao Oriental–1st	Governor of Davao Oriental	Davao Oriental governor Nelson Dayanghirang (not related)	
Nacionalista	Vilma Santos	Batangas–6th	Not running in 2022	Senator Ralph Recto (husband)	
Nacionalista	Frederick Siao	Iligan	Mayor of Iligan	Former representative Vicente Belmonte Jr. (not related)	
Nacionalista	Sharee Ann Tan	Samar–2nd	Governor of Samar	None (Note: Sharee Ann's brother, Samar governor Reynolds Michael Tan, is running under the Nacionalista Party.)	
Nacionalista	Joseph Bernos	Abra	Mayor of La Paz, Abra	Mayor Ching Bernos (wife)	
Navoteño	John Rey Tiangco	Navotas	Mayor of Navotas	Navotas mayor Toby Tiangco (brother)	
NPC	Genaro Alvarez Jr.	Negros Occidental–6th	Not running in 2022	Former representative Mercedes Alvarez (daughter)	
NPC	Elias Bulut Jr.	Apayao	Governor of Apayao	Apayao governor Eleonor Bulut Begtang (sister)	
NPC	Bayani Fernando	Marikina–1st	Mayor of Marikina	Former Marikina vice mayor Jose Fabian Cadiz (no relation)	
NPC	Wes Gatchalian	Valenzuela–1st	Mayor of Valenzuela	Valenzuela mayor Rex Gatchalian (brother)	
NPC	Cesar Jimenez Jr.	Zamboanga City–1st	Mayor of Zamboanga City	None	
NPC	Loren Legarda	Antique	Senator	AA Legarda (brother)	
NPC	Dahlia Loyola	Cavite–5th	Mayor of Carmona, Cavite	Carmona mayor Roy Loyola (husband)	
NPC	Pablo Ortega	La Union–1st	Not running in 2022	La Union Provincial Board member Paolo Ortega V (son)	
NPC	Vicente Veloso III	Leyte–3rd	Not running in 2022	Leyte Provincial Board member Anna Victoria Veloso-Tuazon (daughter)	
NUP	Narciso Bravo Jr.	Masbate–1st	Governor of Masbate	Former representative Maria Vida Bravo (wife)	
NUP	Jose Ong Jr.	Northern Samar–2nd	Not running in 2022	Laoang mayor Harris Ongchuan (nephew)	
NUP	Strike Revilla	Cavite–2nd	Mayor of Bacoor, Cavite	Bacoor mayor Lani Mercado (sister-in-law)	
NUP	Joy Tambunting	Parañaque–2nd	Not running in 2022	(Note: Joy's husband, former representative Gustavo Tambunting, is running under the National Unity Party.)	
One Muntinlupa	Ruffy Biazon	Muntinlupa	Mayor of Muntinlupa	Muntinlupa mayor Jaime Fresnedi (no relation)	
PCM	Rogelio Pacquiao	Sarangani	Governor of Sarangani	Sarangani governor Steve Solon (not related)	
PDP–Laban	Joel Almario	Davao Oriental–2nd	Mayor of Mati, Davao Oriental	Mati councilor Cheeno Almario (son)	
PDP–Laban	Angelica Amante	Agusan del Norte–2nd	Governor of Agusan del Norte	Agusan del Norte governor Dale Corvera (no relation)	
PDP–Laban	Shirlyn Banas-Nograles	South Cotabato–1st (Note: This district was redistricted. The other district, General Santos, did not have candidates from PDP–Laban.)	Mayor of General Santos	Danny Nograles (husband)	
PDP–Laban	Juan Pablo Bondoc	Pampanga–4th	Not running in 2022	None (Note: Juan Pablo's sister, former representative Anna York Bondoc, is running under the Nacionalista Party.)	
PDP–Laban	Joet Garcia	Bataan–2nd	Governor of Bataan	None (Note: Joet's brother, Bataan governor Albert Garcia, is running under the National Unity Party.)	
PDP–Laban	Along Malapitan	Caloocan–1st	Mayor of Caloocan	None (Note: Along's father, Caloocan mayor Oscar Malapitan, is running under the Nacionalista Party.)	
PDP–Laban	Rashidin Matba	Tawi-Tawi	Not running in 2022	Shepard Reyes (not related)	
PDP–Laban	Alyssa Sheena Tan	Isabela–4th	Mayor of Santiago	Santiago mayor Joseph Tan (uncle)	
PDP–Laban	Henry Villarica	Bulacan–4th	Mayor of Meycauayan	Meycauayan mayor Linabelle Villarica (wife)	
Probinsyano Ako	Jose Singson Jr. (Note: Singson is running under the Nationalist People's Coalition.)	Party-list	Mayor of Vigan, Ilocos Sur	None of Probinsyano Ako's nominees are relatives of Singson	
SAGIP	Rodante Marcoleta (Note: Marcoleta was supposed to be running for Senator under PDP–Laban; however days before the election, he withdrew his candidacy.)	Party-list	Senator		
UBJP	Esmael Mangudadatu	Maguindanao–2nd	Governor of Maguindanao	Former representative Dong Mangudadatu (brother)	

== Marginal seats ==
=== Elections in congressional districts ===
These are the marginal seats that had a winning margin of 5% or less in the 2019 elections, in ascending order via margin:

Party	District	Incumbent	2019 margin	2022 result
NUP	Manila–5th	Cristal Bagatsing	0.83%	Incumbent lost
Lakas	Dinagat Islands	Alan Uno Ecleo	0.92%	Incumbent won
Nacionalista	Pangasinan–5th	Ramon Guico III	1.42%	Incumbent did not run
NUP	Masbate–1st	Narciso Bravo Jr.	1.45%	Incumbent did not run
NUP	Misamis Occidental–1st	Diego Ty	1.92%	Incumbent lost
NPC	Ifugao	Solomon Chungalao	1.95%	Incumbent won
NPC	Ilocos Sur–2nd	Kristine Singson-Meehan	2.10%	Incumbent won
NUP	Camarines Sur–2nd	Luis Raymund Villafuerte	2.18%	Incumbent won
Nacionalista	Iligan	Frederick Siao	2.27%	Incumbent won
NPC	Batanes	Jun Gato	2.50%	Incumbent won
Lakas	Lanao del Sur–2nd	Yasser Balindong	2.73%	Incumbent won
NUP	Manila–2nd	Rolan Valeriano	2.77%	Incumbent won
PDP–Laban	Eastern Samar	Maria Fe Abunda	3.11%	Incumbent won
Lakas	Zamboanga del Sur–2nd	Leonardo Babasa Jr.	3.45%	Incumbent lost
Nacionalista	Pangasinan–1st	Arnold Celeste	3.79%	Incumbent did not run
Nacionalista	Bohol–3rd	Alexie Besas-Tutor	4.00%	Incumbent won
Liberal	Makati–1st	Kid Peña	4.20%	Incumbent won
Sigaw	Nueva Ecija–4th	Maricel Natividad-Nagaño	4.59%	Incumbent lost
PDP–Laban	Davao de Oro–2nd (Note: Contested as Compostela Valley–2nd in 2019.)	Ruwel Peter Gonzaga	5.00%	Incumbent won

=== Party-list election ===
The following party-lists won less than 2% of the vote in 2019, and only won one seat each because all of party-list seats have not been filled up by the parties that did win at least 2% of the vote. These are sorted by number of votes in descending order.

Less than 2% of the vote, but greater than or equal to 1%:

- Coalition of Association of Senior Citizens in the Philippines (Rodolfo Ordanes; incumbent won)
- Magkakasama sa Sakahan Kaunlaran (Argel Joseph Cabatbat; incumbent won)
- Association of Philippine Electric Cooperatives (Sergio Dagooc; incumbent won)
- Gabriela Women's Party (Arlene Brosas; incumbent won)
- An Waray (Bem Noel; incumbent won, later unseated)
- Cooperative NATCCO Network Party (Sabiniano Canama; did not run)
- ACT Teachers (France Castro; incumbent won)
- Philippine Rural Electric Cooperatives Association (Presley De Jesus; incumbent won)
- Ako Bisaya (Sonny Lagon; incumbent won)
- Tingog Sinirangan (Yedda Marie Romualdez; incumbent won)
- Abono (Conrado Estrella III; term-limited, party held seat)
- Buhay Hayaan Yumabong (Lito Atienza; ran for vice president, party held seat)
- Duterte Youth (Ducielle Cardema; incumbent won)
- Kalinga-Advocacy for Social Empowerment and Nation Building Through Easing Poverty (Irene Gay Saulog; incumbent won)
- Puwersa ng Bayaning Atleta (Jericho Nograles)
- Alliance of Organizations Networks and Associations of the Philippines (Anna Marie Villaraza-Suarez; incumbent won)
- Rural Electric Consumers and Beneficiaries of Development and Advancement (Godofredo Guya; incumbent lost)
- Bagong Henerasyon (Bernadette Herrera-Dy; incumbent won)
- Bahay para sa Pamilyang Pilipino (Naealla Rose Bainto-Aguinaldo; incumbent lost)
- Construction Workers Solidarity (Romeo Momo Sr.; incumbent ran for House representative from Surigao del Sur's 1st district and won, party held seat)

Less than 1% of the vote:

- Abang Lingkod (Joseph Stephen Paduano; incumbent won)
- Advocacy for Teacher Empowerment Through Action, Cooperation and Harmony Towards Educational Reforms (Maria Victoria Umali; incumbent lost)
- Barangay Health Wellness (Angelica Natasha Co; incumbent won)
- Social Amelioration and Genuine Intervention on Poverty (SAGIP) (Rodante Marcoleta; incumbent won)
- Trade Union Congress Party (Raymond Mendoza; incumbent won)
- Magdalo para sa Pilipino (Manuel Cabochan; incumbent lost)
- Galing sa Puso Party (Jose Gay Padiernos; incumbent won)
- Manila Teachers Savings and Loan Association (Virgilio Lacson; incumbent won)
- Rebolusyonaryong Alyansa Makabansa (Aloysia Lim; incumbent lost)
- Alagaan Natin Ating Kalusugan (Mike Defensor; ran for mayor of Quezon City and lost, party held seat)
- Ako Padayon Pilipino (Adriano Ebcas; incumbent lost)
- Ang Asosayon Sang Mangunguma Nga Bisaya-Owa Mangunguma (Sharon Garin; term-limited, party held seat)
- Kusug Tausug (Shernee Tan-Tambut; incumbent won)
- Dumper Philippines Taxi Drivers Association (Claudine Diana Bautista; incumbent won)
- Talino at Galing ng Pinoy (Jose Teves Jr.; incumbent won)
- Public Safety Alliance for Transformation and Rule of Law (Jorge Antonio Bustos; incumbent won)
- Anak Mindanao (Amihilda Sangcopan; incumbent won)
- Agricultural Sector Alliance of the Philippines (Rico Geron; term-limited, party held seat)
- LPG Marketers Association (LPGMA) (Allan Ty; incumbent won)
- OFW Family Club (Bobby Pacquiao; incumbent lost)
- Kabalikat ng Mamamayan (KABAYAN) (Ron Salo; incumbent won)
- Democratic Independent Workers Association (Michael Edgar Aglipay; incumbent lost)
- Kabataan (Sarah Elago; incumbent won)

== Results ==
Results in elections in congressional districts are expected to be known overnight, while results for the party-list election are expected to be known seven days from election day.

Allies of Bongbong Marcos, the winner of the concurrent presidential election, captured most of the seats in the House of Representatives. Outgoing majority leader Martin Romualdez and former speaker Gloria Macapagal Arroyo are thought to be the contenders for the speakership in the 19th Congress.

=== Elections in congressional districts ===
Party	Votes	%	+/–	Seats	+/–
PDP–Laban	10,950,696	22.77	−8.45	66	−16
Nacionalista Party	6,610,876	13.75	−2.35	36	−6
National Unity Party	6,087,288	12.66	+3.15	33	+8
Nationalist People's Coalition	5,637,211	11.72	−2.59	35	−2
Lakas–CMD	4,432,113	9.22	+4.11	26	+14
Liberal Party	1,823,426	3.79	−1.94	10	−8
Hugpong ng Pagbabago	1,223,815	2.54	+0.93	6	+3
People's Reform Party	942,719	1.96	+1.62	3	+2
Aksyon Demokratiko	868,668	1.81	+0.83	0	0
Partido Pilipino sa Pagbabago	503,827	1.05	New	0	0
Partido para sa Demokratikong Reporma	478,031	0.99	New	2	New
Partido Federal ng Pilipinas	458,038	0.95	−1.43	2	−3
Pederalismo ng Dugong Dakilang Samahan	426,451	0.89	+0.25	2	New
National Unity Party/One Cebu	423,818	0.88	New	2	New
Laban ng Demokratikong Pilipino	373,988	0.78	+0.16	1	−1
Bukidnon Paglaum	336,266	0.70	−0.13	2	0
Unang Sigaw	313,521	0.65	+0.35	0	0
United Bangsamoro Justice Party	292,110	0.61	New	0	0
PROMDI	288,049	0.60	New	0	0
National Unity Party/United Negros Alliance	254,355	0.53	New	2	New
Padayon Pilipino	245,206	0.51	+0.27	2	New
Aksyon Demokratiko/Asenso Manileño	240,559	0.50	New	3	New
Kilusang Bagong Lipunan	213,950	0.44	+0.36	0	0
People's Champ Movement	204,076	0.42	New	1	New
Nacionalista Party/Bileg Ti Ilokano	201,418	0.42	New	1	New
National Unity Party/Asenso Manileño	165,577	0.34	New	2	New
Sulong Zambales Party	144,060	0.30	New	1	New
Mindoro bago Sarili	142,095	0.30	New	1	New
Basilan Unity Party	137,976	0.29	New	1	New
Centrist Democratic Party of the Philippines	128,134	0.27	+0.07	1	0
United Benguet Party	123,801	0.26	New	1	New
Partido Pederal ng Maharlika	104,588	0.22	New	0	0
Bigkis Pinoy Movement	94,571	0.20	New	0	0
Nationalist People's Coalition/Asenso Manileño	90,075	0.19	New	1	New
Partido Navoteño	79,505	0.17	−0.03	1	0
Partido Demokratiko Sosyalista ng Pilipinas	78,029	0.16	+0.02	0	0
Lakas–CMD/United Negros Alliance	76,115	0.16	New	0	New
Hugpong sa Tawong Lungsod	73,796	0.15	−0.34	0	−1
Adelante Zamboanga Party	73,785	0.15	+0.08	1	New
Samahang Kaagapay ng Agilang Pilipino	73,346	0.15	New	0	0
Partidong Pagbabago ng Palawan	71,986	0.15	−0.31	0	−2
Reform Party	70,116	0.15	New	0	0
United Nationalist Alliance	68,572	0.14	−0.43	1	New
Partido Prosperidad y Amor para na Zamboanga	67,133	0.14	New	0	0
Lingkod ng Mamamayan ng Valenzuela City	50,599	0.11	New	0	0
Labor Party Philippines	50,150	0.10	+0.08	0	0
Achievers with Integrity Movement	48,462	0.10	New	0	0
PDP–Laban/Partido Siquijodnon	33,989	0.07	New	1	New
Ummah Party	29,043	0.06	New	0	0
Ang Kapatiran	17,484	0.04	New	0	0
Pwersa ng Masang Pilipino	10,642	0.02	−0.96	0	−1
Partido Lakas ng Masa	5,223	0.01	New	0	0
Philippine Green Republican Party	4,856	0.01	+0.01	0	0
Katipunan ng Nagkakaisang Pilipino	4,370	0.01	−0.28	0	0
Katipunan ng Kamalayang Kayumanggi	2,295	0.00	New	0	0
Bagumbayan–VNP	1,607	0.00	−0.08	0	0
Independent	2,137,093	4.44	−0.53	6	+4
Party-list seats				63	+2
Total	48,089,548	100.00	–	316	+12
Valid votes	48,089,548	86.98	+0.64		
Invalid/blank votes	7,201,273	13.02	−0.64		
Total votes	55,290,821	100.00	–		
Registered voters/turnout	65,745,526	84.10	+8.20		
Source: COMELEC (Results per individual province/city, election day turnout, absentee turnout

Vote share
PDP–Laban	22.73%
Nacionalista	13.72%
NUP	12.63%
NPC	11.70%
Lakas	9.39%
Others	22.53%

Congressional district seats
PDP–Laban	26.09%
Nacionalista	14.23%
NUP	13.04%
NPC	13.83%
Lakas	10.28%
Others	22.53%

==== Results per district ====
Congressional district	Incumbent	Incumbent's party	Winner	Winner's party	Winning margin
Abra	Joseph Bernos	Nacionalista	Ching Bernos	Nacionalista	Unopposed
Agusan del Norte–1st	Lawrence Fortun	Nacionalista	Jose Aquino II	Lakas	3.91%
Agusan del Norte–2nd	Angelica Amante	PDP–Laban	Dale Corvera	PDP–Laban	57.50%
Agusan del Sur–1st	Alfel Bascug	NUP	Alfel Bascug	NUP	Unopposed
Agusan del Sur–2nd	Eddiebong Plaza	NUP	Eddiebong Plaza	NUP	Unopposed
Aklan–1st	Carlito Marquez	NPC	Carlito Marquez	NPC	18.97%
Aklan–2nd	Teodorico Haresco Jr.	Nacionalista	Teodorico Haresco Jr.	Nacionalista	80.19%
Albay–1st	Edcel Lagman	Liberal	Edcel Lagman	Liberal	78.20%
Albay–2nd	Joey Salceda	PDP–Laban	Joey Salceda	PDP–Laban	91.79%
Albay–3rd	Fernando Cabredo	NUP	Fernando Cabredo	NUP	Unopposed
Antipolo–1st	Roberto Puno	NUP	Roberto Puno	NUP	90.20%
Antipolo–2nd	Vacant (Note: Incumbent Resurreccion Acop (NUP) died on May 28, 2021.)		Romeo Acop	NUP	Unopposed
Antique	Loren Legarda	NPC	Antonio Legarda Jr.	NPC	40.36%
Apayao	Elias Bulut Jr.	NPC	Eleanor Begtang	PDP–Laban	Unopposed
Aurora	Rommel T. Angara	LDP	Rommel T. Angara	LDP	Unopposed
Bacolod	Greg Gasataya	NPC	Greg Gasataya	NPC	39.10%
Baguio	Mark Go	Nacionalista	Mark Go	Nacionalista	52.32%
Basilan	Mujiv Hataman	BUP	Mujiv Hataman	BUP	35.96%
Bataan–1st	Geraldine Roman	Lakas	Geraldine Roman	Lakas	Unopposed
Bataan–2nd	Joet Garcia	PDP–Laban	Albert Garcia	NUP	57.88%
Bataan–3rd	New seat		Maria Angela Garcia	NUP	16.50%
Batanes	Jun Gato	NPC	Jun Gato	NPC	7.31%
Batangas–1st	Eileen Ermita-Buhain	Nacionalista	Eric Buhain	Nacionalista	5.10%
Batangas–2nd	Raneo Abu	Nacionalista	Gerville Luistro	NPC	2.18%
Batangas–3rd	Maria Theresa Collantes	NPC	Maria Theresa Collantes	NPC	31.92%
Batangas–4th	Lianda Bolilia	Nacionalista	Lianda Bolilia	Nacionalista	46.12%
Batangas–5th	Marvey Mariño	Nacionalista	Marvey Mariño	Nacionalista	83.96%
Batangas–6th	Vilma Santos	Nacionalista	Ralph Recto	Nacionalista	Unopposed
Benguet	Vacant (Note: Incumbent Nestor Fongwan (PDP–Laban) died on December 18, 2019.)		Eric Yap	UBP	26.09%
Biliran	Gerardo Espina Jr.	Lakas	Gerardo Espina Jr.	Lakas	Unopposed
Biñan	Len Alonte	PDP–Laban	Len Alonte	PDP–Laban	39.36%
Bohol–1st	Edgar Chatto	NUP	Edgar Chatto	NUP	54.77%
Bohol–2nd	Aris Aumentado	NPC	Vanvan Aumentado	PRP	18.73%
Bohol–3rd	Alexie Tutor	Nacionalista	Alexie Tutor	Nacionalista	30.57%
Bukidnon–1st	Maria Lourdes Acosta-Alba	BPP	Jose Manuel Alba	BPP	18.76%
Bukidnon–2nd	Jonathan Keith Flores	Nacionalista	Jonathan Keith Flores	Nacionalista	25.42%
Bukidnon–3rd	Manuel Zubiri	BPP	Jose Maria Zubiri Jr.	BPP	16.08%
Bukidnon–4th	Rogelio Neil Roque	PRP	Laarni Roque	Nacionalista	34.20%
Bulacan–1st	Jose Antonio Sy-Alvarado	PDP–Laban	Danny Domingo	NUP	17.78%
Bulacan–2nd	Gavini Pancho	NUP	Augustina Dominique Pancho	NUP	65.99%
Bulacan–3rd	Lorna Silverio	NUP	Lorna Silverio	NUP	39.49%
Bulacan–4th	Henry Villarica	PDP–Laban	Linabelle Villarica	PDP–Laban	85.21%
Bulacan–5th	New seat		Ambrosio Cruz	PDP–Laban	6.30%
Bulacan–6th	New seat		Salvador Pleyto	PDP–Laban	2.26%
Cagayan–1st	Ramon Nolasco Jr.	NPC	Ramon Nolasco Jr.	NPC	19.16%
Cagayan–2nd	Samantha Louise Vargas-Alfonso	NUP	Baby Alfonso	Lakas	80.54%
Cagayan–3rd	Joseph Lara	PDP–Laban	Joseph Lara	PDP–Laban	30.73%
Cagayan de Oro–1st	Rolando Uy	NUP	Lordan Suan	Padayon Pilipino	9.34%
Cagayan de Oro–2nd	Rufus Rodriguez	CDP	Rufus Rodriguez	CDP	69.16%
Calamba	Jun Chipeco	Nacionalista	Cha Hernandez	PDP–Laban	3.28%
Caloocan–1st	Along Malapitan	PDP–Laban	Oscar Malapitan	Nacionalista	50.13%
Caloocan–2nd	Edgar Erice	Aksyon	Mitzi Cajayon	PDP–Laban	12.50%
Caloocan–3rd	New seat		Dean Asistio	PDP–Laban	11.58%
Camarines Norte–1st	Josefina Tallado	PDP–Laban	Josefina Tallado	PDP–Laban	3.38%
Camarines Norte–2nd	Vacant (Note: Incumbent Marisol Panotes (PDP–Laban) died on April 29, 2022.)		Rosemarie Panotes	PDP–Laban	24.30%
Camarines Sur–1st	Vacant (Note: Incumbent Marissa Andaya (NPC) died on July 5, 2020.)		Hori Horibata	PDP–Laban	5.96%
Camarines Sur–2nd	Luis Raymund Villafuerte	NUP	Luis Raymund Villafuerte	NUP	57.32%
Camarines Sur–3rd	Gabriel Bordado	Liberal	Gabriel Bordado	Liberal	36.77%
Camarines Sur–4th	Arnulf Bryan Fuentebella	NPC	Arnulf Bryan Fuentebella	NPC	17.20%
Camarines Sur–5th	Jocelyn Fortuno	Nacionalista	Miguel Luis Villafuerte	PDP–Laban	20.30%
Camiguin	Xavier Jesus Romualdo	PDP–Laban	Jurdin Jesus Romualdo	PDP–Laban	30.48%
Capiz–1st	Tawi Billones	Liberal	Tawi Billones	Liberal	26.80%
Capiz–2nd	Fredenil Castro	Lakas	Jane Castro	Lakas	19.68%
Catanduanes	Hector Sanchez	Lakas	Leo Rodriguez	Independent	16.70%
Cavite–1st	Francis Gerald Abaya	Liberal	Jolo Revilla	Lakas	4.62%
Cavite–2nd	Strike Revilla	Nacionalista	Lani Mercado	Lakas	76.78%
Cavite–3rd	Alex Advincula	NUP	Adrian Jay Advincula	NUP	Unopposed
Cavite–4th	Elpidio Barzaga Jr.	NUP	Elpidio Barzaga Jr.	NUP	79.72%
Cavite–5th	Dahlia Loyola	NPC	Roy Loyola	NPC	83.14%
Cavite–6th	Luis Ferrer IV	NUP	Antonio Ferrer	NUP	Unopposed
Cavite–7th	Jesus Crispin Remulla	NUP	Jesus Crispin Remulla	NUP	Unopposed
Cavite–8th	Abraham Tolentino	NUP	Aniela Tolentino	NUP	79.48%
Cebu–1st	Eduardo Gullas	Nacionalista	Rhea Gullas	Nacionalista	Unopposed
Cebu–2nd	Wilfredo Caminero	NUP	Edsel Galeos	PDP–Laban	4.33%
Cebu–3rd	Pablo John Garcia	NUP	Pablo John Garcia	NUP	Unopposed
Cebu–4th	Janice Salimbangon	NUP	Janice Salimbangon	NUP	23.08%
Cebu–5th	Duke Frasco	NUP	Duke Frasco	NUP	34.36%
Cebu–6th	Emmarie Dizon	PDP–Laban	Daphne Lagon	Lakas	55.56%
Cebu–7th	Peter John Calderon	NPC	Peter John Calderon	NPC	Unopposed
Cebu City–1st	Vacant (Note: Incumbent Raul del Mar (Liberal) died on November 16, 2020.)		Rachel del Mar	NPC	20.77%
Cebu City–2nd	Rodrigo Abellanosa	LDP	Eduardo Rama Jr.	PDP–Laban	8.86%
Cotabato–1st	Joselito Sacdalan	PDP–Laban	Joselito Sacdalan	PDP–Laban	83.44%
Cotabato–2nd	Rudy Caoagdan	Nacionalista	Rudy Caoagdan	Nacionalista	92.80%
Cotabato–3rd	Jose Tejada	Nacionalista	Maria Alana Samantha Santos	Lakas	24.21%
Davao City–1st	Paolo Duterte	HNP	Paolo Duterte	HNP	86.75%
Davao City–2nd	Vincent Garcia	HNP	Vincent Garcia	HNP	36.42%
Davao City–3rd	Isidro Ungab	HNP	Isidro Ungab	HNP	95.62%
Davao de Oro–1st	Manuel E. Zamora	HNP	Maricar Zamora	HNP	11.31%
Davao de Oro–2nd	Ruwel Peter Gonzaga	PDP–Laban	Ruwel Peter Gonzaga	PDP–Laban	20.82%
Davao del Norte–1st	Pantaleon Alvarez	Reporma	Pantaleon Alvarez	Reporma	14.23%
Davao del Norte–2nd	Alan Dujali	HNP	Alan Dujali	HNP	25.98%
Davao del Sur	Mercedes Cagas	Nacionalista	John Tracy Cagas	Nacionalista	40.87%
Davao Occidental	Lorna Bautista-Bandigan	Lakas	Claude Bautista	HNP	Unopposed
Davao Oriental–1st	Corazon Nuñez Malanyaon	Nacionalista	Nelson Dayanghirang	Nacionalista	Unopposed
Davao Oriental–2nd	Joel Mayo Almario	PDP–Laban	Cheeno Almario	PDP–Laban	16.86%
Dinagat Islands	Alan Ecleo	Lakas	Alan Ecleo	Lakas	29.44%
Eastern Samar	Maria Fe Abunda	PDP–Laban	Maria Fe Abunda	PDP–Laban	89.18%
General Santos	New seat		Loreto Acharon	NPC	13.11%
Guimaras	Lucille Nava	PDP–Laban	Lucille Nava	PDP–Laban	94.44%
Ifugao	Solomon Chungalao	NPC	Solomon Chungalao	NPC	12.96%
Iligan	Frederick Siao	Nacionalista	Celso Regencia	PDP–Laban	3.54%
Ilocos Norte–1st	Ria Christina Fariñas	PDP–Laban	Sandro Marcos	Nacionalista	13.26%
Ilocos Norte–2nd	Eugenio Angelo Barba	Nacionalista	Eugenio Angelo Barba	Nacionalista	59.96%
Ilocos Sur–1st	Deogracias Victor Savellano	Nacionalista	Ronald Singson	NPC	14.96%
Ilocos Sur–2nd	Kristine Singson-Meehan	NPC	Kristine Singson-Meehan	NPC	Unopposed
Iloilo–1st	Janette Garin	NUP	Janette Garin	NUP	66.96%
Iloilo–2nd	Michael Gorriceta	Nacionalista	Michael Gorriceta	Nacionalista	Unopposed
Iloilo–3rd	Lorenz Defensor	NUP	Lorenz Defensor	NUP	96.56%
Iloilo–4th	Braeden John Biron	Nacionalista	Ferjenel Biron	Nacionalista	60.45%
Iloilo–5th	Raul Tupas	Nacionalista	Raul Tupas	Nacionalista	39.36%
Iloilo City	Julienne Baronda	NUP	Julienne Baronda	NUP	27.08%
Isabela–1st	Tonypet Albano	Lakas	Tonypet Albano	Lakas	95.20%
Isabela–2nd	Ed Christopher Go	Nacionalista	Ed Christopher Go	Nacionalista	71.93%
Isabela–3rd	Ian Paul Dy	NPC	Ian Paul Dy	NPC	Unopposed
Isabela–4th	Alyssa Sheena Tan-Dy	PDP–Laban	Joseph Tan	PDP–Laban	53.56%
Isabela–5th	Mike Dy	NPC	Mike Dy	NPC	34.85%
Isabela–6th	Inno Dy	PDP–Laban	Inno Dy	PDP–Laban	81.66%
Kalinga	Allen Jesse Mangaoang	Nacionalista	Allen Jesse Mangaoang	Nacionalista	52.10%
La Union–1st	Pablo Ortega	NPC	Paolo Ortega	NPC	57.46%
La Union–2nd	Sandra Eriguel	Lakas	Dante Garcia	PRP	8.28%
Laguna–1st	Danilo Fernandez	NUP	Ann Matibag	PDP–Laban	11.64%
Laguna–2nd	Ruth Hernandez	PDP–Laban	Ruth Hernandez	PDP–Laban	28.06%
Laguna–3rd	Sol Aragones	Nacionalista	Loreto Amante	PDP–Laban	47.67%
Laguna–4th	Benjamin Agarao Jr.	PDP–Laban	Jam Agarao	PDP–Laban	0.08%
Lanao del Norte–1st	Mohamad Khalid Dimaporo	PDP–Laban	Mohamad Khalid Dimaporo	PDP–Laban	75.74%
Lanao del Norte–2nd	Abdullah Dimaporo	NPC	Aminah Dimaporo	Lakas	82.28%
Lanao del Sur–1st	Ansaruddin Alonto Adiong	Nacionalista	Zia Alonto Adiong	Lakas	72.94%
Lanao del Sur–2nd	Yasser Balindong	Lakas	Yasser Balindong	Lakas	13.96%
Lapu-Lapu City	Paz Radaza	Lakas	Cynthia Chan	PDP–Laban	54.65%
Las Piñas	Camille Villar	Nacionalista	Camille Villar	Nacionalista	30.29%
Leyte–1st	Martin Romualdez	Lakas	Martin Romualdez	Lakas	Unopposed
Leyte–2nd	Lolita Javier	Nacionalista	Lolita Javier	Nacionalista	45.59%
Leyte–3rd	Vicente Veloso III	NPC	Anna Veloso Tuazon	NUP	Unopposed
Leyte–4th	Lucy Torres-Gomez	PDP–Laban	Richard Gomez	PDP–Laban	11.62%
Leyte–5th	Carl Cari	PDP–Laban	Carl Cari	PDP–Laban	Unopposed
Maguindanao–1st	Datu Roonie Sinsuat Sr.	UBJP	Dimple Mastura	PDP–Laban	17.73%
Maguindanao–2nd	Esmael Mangudadatu	UBJP	Mohamad Paglas	Nacionalista	16.39%
Makati–1st	Kid Peña	Liberal	Kid Peña	Liberal	91.75%
Makati–2nd	Luis Campos	NPC	Luis Campos	NPC	83.50%
Malabon	Josephine Lacson-Noel	NPC	Josephine Lacson-Noel	NPC	12.18%
Mandaluyong	Neptali Gonzales II	NUP	Neptali Gonzales II	NUP	56.36%
Mandaue	New seat		Emmarie Dizon (Note: Redistricted from Cebu–6th.)	PDP–Laban	Unopposed
Manila–1st	Manny Lopez	PDP–Laban	Ernix Dionisio	Asenso Manileño	6.74%
Manila–2nd	Rolando Valeriano	NUP	Rolando Valeriano	NUP	24.22%
Manila–3rd	Yul Servo	Asenso Manileño	Joel Chua	Asenso Manileño	37.28%
Manila–4th	Edward Maceda	NPC	Edward Maceda	NPC	52.25%
Manila–5th	Cristal Bagatsing	NUP	Irwin Tieng	Asenso Manileño	1.98%
Manila–6th	Benny Abante	NUP	Benny Abante	NUP	60.89%
Marikina–1st	Bayani Fernando	NPC	Marjorie Ann Teodoro	UNA	47.22%
Marikina–2nd	Stella Quimbo	Liberal	Stella Quimbo	Liberal	66.12%
Marinduque	Lord Allan Velasco	PDP–Laban	Lord Allan Velasco	PDP–Laban	Unopposed
Masbate–1st	Narciso Bravo Jr.	NUP	Richard Kho	PDP–Laban	18.68%
Masbate–2nd	Elisa Olga Kho	PDP–Laban	Ara Kho	PDP–Laban	47.36%
Masbate–3rd	Wilton Kho	PDP–Laban	Wilton Kho	PDP–Laban	27.10%
Misamis Occidental–1st	Diego Ty	NUP	Jason Almonte	PDP–Laban	17.11%
Misamis Occidental–2nd	Henry Oaminal	Nacionalista	Ando Oaminal	Nacionalista	52.69%
Misamis Oriental–1st	Christian Unabia	Lakas	Christian Unabia	Lakas	4.02%
Misamis Oriental–2nd	Juliette Uy	NUP	Yevgeny Emano	Padayon Pilipino	13.23%
Mountain Province	Maximo Dalog Jr.	Nacionalista	Maximo Dalog Jr.	Nacionalista	12.18%
Muntinlupa	Ruffy Biazon	One Muntinlupa	Jaime Fresnedi	Liberal	55.42%
Navotas	John Rey Tiangco	Partido Navoteño	Toby Tiangco	Partido Navoteño	25.70%
Negros Occidental–1st	Gerardo Valmayor Jr.	NPC	Gerardo Valmayor Jr.	NPC	Unopposed
Negros Occidental–2nd	Leo Rafael Cueva	NUP	Alfredo Marañon III	NUP	Unopposed
Negros Occidental–3rd	Jose Francisco Benitez	PDP–Laban	Jose Francisco Benitez	PDP–Laban	84.66%
Negros Occidental–4th	Juliet Marie Ferrer	NUP	Juliet Marie Ferrer	NUP	Unopposed
Negros Occidental–5th	Maria Lourdes Arroyo	Lakas	Dino Yulo	Independent	19.47%
Negros Occidental–6th	Genaro Alvarez Jr.	NPC	Mercedes Lansang	NPC	Unopposed
Negros Oriental–1st	Jocelyn Sy-Limkaichong	Liberal	Jocelyn Sy-Limkaichong	Liberal	Unopposed
Negros Oriental–2nd	Chiquiting Sagarbarria	NPC	Chiquiting Sagarbarria	NPC	21.36%
Negros Oriental–3rd	Arnie Teves	NPC	Arnie Teves	NPC	2.03%
Northern Samar–1st	Paul Daza	NUP	Paul Daza	NUP	30.44%
Northern Samar–2nd	Jose Ong Jr.	NUP	Harris Ongchuan	NUP	75.04%
Nueva Ecija–1st	Estrellita Suansing	PDP–Laban	Mika Suansing	Nacionalista	32.02%
Nueva Ecija–2nd	Micaela Violago	NUP	Joseph Gilbert Violago	NUP	20.71%
Nueva Ecija–3rd	Rosanna Vergara	PDP–Laban	Rosanna Vergara	PDP–Laban	6.16%
Nueva Ecija–4th	Maricel Natividad-Nagaño	Unang Sigaw	Emeng Pascual	PDP–Laban	7.10%
Nueva Vizcaya	Luisa Cuaresma	Lakas	Luisa Cuaresma	Lakas	45.11%
Occidental Mindoro	Josephine Sato	Liberal	Odie Tarriela	PDDS	20.08%
Oriental Mindoro–1st	Paulino Salvador Leachon	MBS	Arnan Panaligan	MBS	23.49%
Oriental Mindoro–2nd	Alfonso Umali Jr.	Liberal	Alfonso Umali Jr.	Liberal	11.05%
Palawan–1st	Franz Alvarez	NUP	Edgardo Salvame	PRP	9.57%
Palawan–2nd	Beng Abueg	Liberal	Jose Alvarez	PDP–Laban	19.27%
Palawan–3rd	Gil Acosta Jr.	PPPL	Edward Hagedorn	PDP–Laban	5.48%
Pampanga–1st	Carmelo Lazatin II	PDP–Laban	Carmelo Lazatin II	PDP–Laban	Unopposed
Pampanga–2nd	Mikey Arroyo	Lakas	Gloria Macapagal Arroyo	Lakas	Unopposed
Pampanga–3rd	Aurelio Gonzales Jr.	PDP–Laban	Aurelio Gonzales Jr.	PDP–Laban	Unopposed
Pampanga–4th	Juan Pablo Bondoc	PDP–Laban	Anna York Bondoc	Nacionalista	92.50%
Pangasinan–1st	Arnold Celeste	Nacionalista	Arthur Celeste	Nacionalista	30.38%
Pangasinan–2nd	Jumel Anthony Espino	PDP–Laban	Mark Cojuangco	NPC	4.98%
Pangasinan–3rd	Rose Marie Arenas	PDP–Laban	Maria Rachel Arenas	PDP–Laban	82.77%
Pangasinan–4th	Christopher de Venecia	Lakas	Christopher de Venecia	Lakas	60.06%
Pangasinan–5th	Ramon Guico III	Nacionalista	Ramon Guico Jr.	Lakas	18.80%
Pangasinan–6th	Tyrone Agabas	NPC	Marlyn Primicias-Agabas	PDP–Laban	85.40%
Parañaque–1st	Eric Olivarez	PDP–Laban	Edwin Olivarez	PDP–Laban	84.56%
Parañaque–2nd	Joy Myra Tambunting	NUP	Gustavo Tambunting	NUP	5.78%
Pasay	Antonino Calixto	PDP–Laban	Antonino Calixto	PDP–Laban	70.54%
Pasig	Roman Romulo	Independent	Roman Romulo	Independent	68.88%
Quezon–1st	Mark Enverga	NPC	Mark Enverga	NPC	73.73%
Quezon–2nd	David C. Suarez	Nacionalista	David C. Suarez	Nacionalista	8.71%
Quezon–3rd	Aleta Suarez	Lakas	Reynante Arrogancia	Reporma	22.08%
Quezon–4th	Angelina Tan	NPC	Keith Micah Tan	NPC	53.07%
Quezon City–1st	Anthony Peter Crisologo	Lakas	Arjo Atayde	Independent	35.40%
Quezon City–2nd	Precious Hipolito	Lakas	Ralph Tulfo	Independent	12.97%
Quezon City–3rd	Allan Benedict Reyes	NPC	Franz Pumaren	NUP	3.27%
Quezon City–4th	Bong Suntay	PDP–Laban	Marvin Rillo	Lakas	1.18%
Quezon City–5th	Alfred Vargas	PDP–Laban	Patrick Michael Vargas	PDP–Laban	15.16%
Quezon City–6th	Kit Belmonte	Liberal	Marivic Co-Pilar	NUP	26.30%
Quirino	Junie Cua	PDDS	Midy Cua	PDDS	88.18%
Rizal–1st	Jack Duavit	NPC	Jack Duavit	NPC	Unopposed
Rizal–2nd	Fidel Nograles	Lakas	Dino Tanjuatco	Liberal	62.16%
Rizal–3rd	New seat		Jose Arturo Garcia Jr.	NPC	13.12%
Rizal–4th	New seat		Fidel Nograles (Note: Redistricted from Rizal–2nd.)	Lakas	37.80%
Romblon	Eleandro Jesus Madrona	Nacionalista	Eleandro Jesus Madrona	Nacionalista	62.36%
Samar–1st	Edgar Mary Sarmiento	NUP	Stephen James Tan	Nacionalista	17.72%
Samar–2nd	Sharee Ann Tan	Nacionalista	Reynolds Michael Tan	Nacionalista	32.42%
San Jose del Monte	Florida Robes	PDP–Laban	Florida Robes	PDP–Laban	28.42%
San Juan	Ronaldo Zamora	PDP–Laban	Ysabel Zamora	PDP–Laban	29.04%
Santa Rosa	New seat		Danilo Fernandez (Note: Redistricted from Cebu–6th.)	NUP	28.18%
Sarangani	Rogelio Pacquiao	PCM	Steve Solon	PCM	84.76%
Siquijor	Jake Vincent Villa	NPC	Zaldy Villa	PDP–Laban	11.51%
Sorsogon–1st	Evelina Escudero	NPC	Dette Escudero	NPC	32.84%
Sorsogon–2nd	Vacant (Note: Incumbent Bernardita Ramos (NPC) died on September 8, 2020.)		Wowo Fortes	NPC	3.94%
South Cotabato–1st	Shirlyn Bañas-Nograles	PDP–Laban	Ed Lumayag	PFP	17.90%
South Cotabato–2nd	Ferdinand Hernandez	PDP–Laban	Peter Miguel	PFP	14.52%
Southern Leyte–1st	Vacant (Note: Incumbent Roger Mercado (Lakas–CMD) redistricted from Southern Leyte and resigned on October 13, 2021 after being appointed as Secretary of Public Works and Highways.)		Luz Mercado	NUP	76.18%
Southern Leyte–2nd	New seat		Christopherson Yap	PDP–Laban	21.94%
Sultan Kudarat–1st	Rihan Sakaluran	Lakas	Rihan Sakaluran	Lakas	60.26%
Sultan Kudarat–2nd	Horacio Suansing Jr.	NUP	Horacio Suansing Jr.	NUP	19.02%
Sulu–1st	Samier Tan	PDP–Laban	Samier Tan	PDP–Laban	Unopposed
Sulu–2nd	Abdulmunir Arbison	Nacionalista	Munir Arbison Jr.	Lakas	Unopposed
Surigao del Norte–1st	Francisco Jose Matugas II	PDP–Laban	Francisco Jose Matugas II	PDP–Laban	22.40%
Surigao del Norte–2nd	Ace Barbers	Nacionalista	Ace Barbers	Nacionalista	43.12%
Surigao del Sur–1st	Prospero Pichay Jr.	Lakas	Romeo Momo	Independent	4.33%
Surigao del Sur–2nd	Johnny Pimentel	PDP–Laban	Johnny Pimentel	PDP–Laban	51.86%
Taguig–Pateros	Alan Peter Cayetano	Independent	Ricardo Cruz Jr.	Nacionalista	9.02%
Taguig	Lani Cayetano	Nacionalista	Pammy Zamora	Nacionalista	37.50%
Tarlac–1st	Vacant (Note: Incumbent Carlos Cojuangco (NPC) died on February 22, 2022.)		Jaime Cojuangco	NPC	89.04%
Tarlac–2nd	Victor Yap	NPC	Christian Yap	NPC	64.02%
Tarlac–3rd	Noel Villanueva	NPC	Bong Rivera	NPC	12.83%
Tawi-Tawi	Rashidin Matba	PDP–Laban	Dimszar Sali	NUP	2.86%
Valenzuela–1st	Wes Gatchalian	NPC	Rex Gatchalian	NPC	Unopposed
Valenzuela–2nd	Eric Martinez	PDP–Laban	Eric Martinez	PDP–Laban	44.66%
Zambales–1st	Jeffrey Khonghun	Nacionalista	Jay Khonghun	Nacionalista	59.08%
Zambales–2nd	Cheryl Deloso-Montalla	NPC	Bing Maniquiz	SZP	28.96%
Zamboanga City–1st	Cesar Jimenez Jr.	NPC	Khymer Adan Olaso	AZAP	12.03%
Zamboanga City–2nd	Mannix Dalipe	Lakas	Mannix Dalipe	Lakas	18.44%
Zamboanga del Norte–1st	Romeo Jalosjos Jr.	Nacionalista	Pinpin Uy	PDP–Laban	0.33%
Zamboanga del Norte–2nd	Glona Labadlabad	PDP–Laban	Glona Labadlabad	PDP–Laban	86.88%
Zamboanga del Norte–3rd	Isagani Amatong	Liberal	Ian Amatong	Liberal	11.23%
Zamboanga del Sur–1st	Divina Grace Yu	PDP–Laban	Divina Grace Yu	PDP–Laban	11.12%
Zamboanga del Sur–2nd	Leonardo Babasa Jr.	Lakas	Victoria Yu	PDP–Laban	20.26%
Zamboanga Sibugay–1st	Wilter Palma II	Lakas	Wilter Palma	Lakas	19.30%
Zamboanga Sibugay–2nd	Dulce Ann Hofer	PDP–Laban	Tata Eudela	Lakas	0.81%

=== Party-list election ===
A total of 177 parties and organizations were included in the draw on how these would be listed in the ballot.

The commission originally expected to proclaim the winners in seven days. A week after the election, the commission said it plans to proclaim the winners on May 19. Upon the proclamation of senators-elect on May 18, the commission said they'd proclaim the winning party-lists after the results of the special elections in 12 barangays in Tubaran, Lanao del Sur on May 24 are known. COMELEC did proclaim the winners on May 26.

Party	Votes	%	+/–	Seats	+/–
ACT-CIS Partylist	2,111,091	5.80	−3.77	3	0
1-Rider Partylist	1,001,243	2.75	New	2	New
Tingog Party List	886,959	2.44	+1.01	2	+1
4Ps Party-list	848,237	2.33	New	2	New
Ako Bicol	816,445	2.24	−1.54	2	0
SAGIP Partylist	780,456	2.14	+1.20	2	+1
Ang Probinsyano Party-list	714,634	1.96	−0.82	1	−1
Uswag Ilonggo	689,607	1.89	New	1	New
Tutok To Win Party-List	685,578	1.88	New	1	New
Citizens' Battle Against Corruption	637,044	1.75	−1.60	1	−1
Senior Citizens Partylist	614,671	1.69	−0.18	1	0
Duterte Youth	602,196	1.65	+0.37	1	0
Agimat Partylist	586,909	1.61	New	1	New
Kabataan	536,690	1.47	+0.76	1	0
ANGAT Party List	530,485	1.46	New	1	New
Marino Party List	530,382	1.46	−1.00	1	−1
Ako Bisaya	512,795	1.41	−0.02	1	0
Probinsyano Ako	471,904	1.30	−0.98	1	−1
LPG Marketers Association	453,895	1.25	+0.48	1	0
Abante Pangasinan-Ilokano Party	451,372	1.24	New	1	New
Gabriela Women's Party	423,891	1.16	−0.46	1	0
Construction Workers Solidarity	412,333	1.13	+0.12	1	0
AGRI Partylist	393,987	1.08	+0.59	1	+1
P3PWD	391,174	1.07	New	1	New
Ako Ilocano Ako	387,086	1.06	New	1	New
Kusug Tausug	385,770	1.06	+0.23	1	0
Kalinga Partylist	374,308	1.03	−0.20	1	0
AGAP Partylist	367,533	1.01	+0.25	1	0
Coop-NATCCO	346,341	0.95	−0.56	1	0
Malasakit@Bayanihan	345,199	0.95	New	1	New
Barangay Health Wellness Partylist	335,598	0.92	−0.06	1	0
Galing sa Puso Party	333,817	0.92	+0.02	1	0
Bagong Henerasyon	330,937	0.91	−0.14	1	0
Alliance of Concerned Teachers	330,529	0.91	−0.52	1	0
TGP Partylist	327,912	0.90	+0.11	1	0
Bicol Saro	325,371	0.89	New	1	New
United Senior Citizens Partylist (Note: United Senior Citizens is entitled to a seat in Congress based on the results. However, as of May 25th, they have not been proclaimed as they have a pending case in the COMELEC regarding their accreditation. United Senior Citizens was later proclaimed as a winning party, with its nominee being sworn in in November 2022.)	320,627	0.88	New	1	New
DUMPER Partylist	314,618	0.86	+0.05	1	0
Pinuno Partylist	299,990	0.82	New	1	New
Abang Lingkod	296,800	0.82	−0.18	1	0
PBA Partylist	294,619	0.81	−0.37	1	0
OFW Partylist	293,301	0.81	New	1	New
Abono Partylist	288,752	0.79	−0.58	1	0
Anakalusugan	281,512	0.77	−0.09	1	0
Kabalikat ng Mamamayan	280,066	0.77	+0.05	1	0
Magsasaka Partylist	276,889	0.76	−1.03	1	0
1-Pacman Party List	273,195	0.75	−1.82	1	−1
APEC Partylist	271,380	0.75	−0.98	1	0
Pusong Pinoy	262,044	0.72	New	1	New
Trade Union Congress Party	260,779	0.72	−0.21	1	0
Patrol Partylist	252,571	0.69	−0.09	1	0
Manila Teachers Party-List	249,525	0.69	−0.21	1	0
AAMBIS-Owa Party List	246,053	0.68	−0.17	1	0
Philreca Party-List	243,487	0.67	−0.76	1	0
Alona Party List	238,704	0.66	−0.50	1	0
Akbayan (Note: Akbayan was later proclaimed as a winning party, with its nominee set to be sworn in by September 2024, after the Supreme Court affirmed the COMELEC's decision to cancel the registration of An Waray in September 2024.)	236,226	0.65	+0.02	1	+1
Democratic Independent Workers Association	234,996	0.65	−0.06	0	−1
Asenso Pinoy	232,229	0.64	New	0	0
Ipeace Epanaw (Note: This partylist was rejected by COMELEC from joining the 2022 elections, but has secured a Temporary Restraining Order from the Supreme Court. Because of this, they have been included in the ballot and their votes are counted for calculation purposes.)	230,315	0.63	New	0	0
Ang Pamilya Muna	225,041	0.62	New	0	0
A Teacher Partylist	221,327	0.61	−0.38	0	−1
Bayan Muna	219,848	0.60	−3.41	0	−3
1CARE Party-list	218,215	0.60	+0.13	0	0
YACAP Partylist	214,694	0.59	−0.02	0	0
Kasama Partylist	213,539	0.59	New	0	0
Ako Bisdak Partylist	204,111	0.56	+0.37	0	0
Abante Sambayanan	201,961	0.55	New	0	0
1-APTO	183,869	0.50	New	0	0
Angat Pinoy Partylist	174,452	0.48	New	0	0
TODA Partylist	174,396	0.48	New	0	0
AKO OFW Partylist	169,177	0.46	New	0	0
PNP Retirees Association	160,418	0.44	+0.15	0	0
SMILE Partylist	158,245	0.43	New	0	0
Pamilyang Magsasaka	158,034	0.43	New	0	0
PEACE Party-list	157,617	0.43	0.00	0	0
Bayaning Tsuper	157,278	0.43	New	0	0
ACTS-OFW	155,072	0.43	−0.05	0	0
Buklod Filipino Party List	151,502	0.42	+0.34	0	0
Tulungan Tayo	147,050	0.40	New	0	0
Filipino Rights Protection Advocates of Manila Movement	144,969	0.40	New	0	0
BAHAY Partylist	142,676	0.39	−0.62	0	−1
Trabaho Partylist	138,973	0.38	New	0	0
Anak Mindanao	134,647	0.37	−0.39	0	−1
Ako Padayon Pilipino Party List	132,222	0.36	−0.48	0	−1
CANCER Partylist	128,284	0.35	New	0	0
Kamalayan	126,393	0.35	New	0	0
Magdalo Party-List	119,189	0.33	−0.59	0	−1
PDP Cares Foundation	117,139	0.32	New	0	0
RECOBADA Partylist	117,126	0.32	−0.82	0	−1
Act as One Philippines	116,173	0.32	New	0	0
Koop-KAMPI Partylist	114,587	0.31	+0.13	0	0
WIFI Partylist	113,971	0.31	New	0	0
Bisaya Gyud Party-List	113,388	0.31	New	0	0
Hugpong Federal Movement of the Philippines	112,654	0.31	New	0	0
Moro Ako - Ok Party-List	110,171	0.30	New	0	0
Angkla Patylist	109,343	0.30	−0.35	0	0
ANAC-IP Partylist	108,807	0.30	New	0	0
Passengers and Riders Organization	108,647	0.30	New	0	0
Ang Kabuhayan Partylist	108,535	0.30	+0.02	0	0
Ang Tinig ng Seniors Citizens	104,957	0.29	New	0	0
Lungsod Aasenso	103,149	0.28	New	0	0
Buhay Party-List	103,077	0.28	−1.02	0	−1
Una ang Edukasyon	102,687	0.28	−0.15	0	0
Igorot Warriors International, Inc.	95,217	0.26	New	0	0
OFW Family Club	93,059	0.26	−0.47	0	−1
HELP Pilipinas	93,007	0.26	New	0	0
Wow Pilipinas Movement	90,698	0.25	−0.37	0	0
Kapamilya ng Manggagawang Pilipino	89,695	0.25	New	0	0
Aasenso Partylist	88,611	0.24	−0.03	0	0
FPJ Partylist	88,564	0.24	New	0	0
Butil Farmers Party	87,305	0.24	−0.35	0	0
Abante Pilipinas	87,211	0.24	−0.11	0	0
Subanen Party-List	86,533	0.24	New	0	0
Turismo Isulong Mo	86,119	0.24	New	0	0
Abe Kapampangan	85,226	0.23	−0.07	0	0
Barkadahan para sa Bansa	83,860	0.23	New	0	0
Anakpawis	81,436	0.22	−0.31	0	0
UMA Ilonggo Party-List	73,454	0.20	New	0	0
Ang Kabuhayang Kayang Kaya	72,547	0.20	New	0	0
NASECORE Partylist	71,822	0.20	−0.09	0	0
Rebolusyonaryong Alyansang Makabansa	69,740	0.19	−0.66	0	−1
Ayuda sa May Kapansanan	66,457	0.18	New	0	0
Ang Bumbero ng Pilipinas	65,929	0.18	New	0	0
Kilusang Maypagasa	65,133	0.18	−0.10	0	0
Mothers for Change	64,785	0.18	New	0	0
One Coop	64,627	0.18	New	0	0
Ang Komadrona	64,087	0.18	New	0	0
STL Partylist	60,384	0.17	New	0	0
Malabung Workers Party	59,499	0.16	New	0	0
Ang Laban ng Indiginong Filipino	58,658	0.16	−0.09	0	0
Kabalikat ng Bayan sa Kaunlaran	57,692	0.16	New	0	0
Bunyog Party	57,030	0.16	New	0	0
CLICK Partylist	55,842	0.15	New	0	0
KAPUSO PM	53,635	0.15	New	0	0
HOME OWNER Partylist	53,560	0.15	New	0	0
Kilos Mamamayan Ngayon Na	52,205	0.14	New	0	0
United Frontliners of the Philippines	50,849	0.14	New	0	0
Alsa Bisaya	47,415	0.13	New	0	0
Bangon Philippine Outsourcing	47,382	0.13	New	0	0
Lingkud Bayanihan Party	43,896	0.12	New	0	0
Maharlikang Pilipino Party	43,260	0.12	New	0	0
ARTE Partylist	42,086	0.12	New	0	0
Ipatupad for Workers Inc.	41,797	0.11	New	0	0
Kabalikat Partylist	39,344	0.11	+0.01	0	0
Babae Ako para sa Bayan	39,254	0.11	New	0	0
Damayan Partylist	36,394	0.10	New	0	0
Partido Cocoman	35,583	0.10	New	0	0
Aktibong Kaagapay ng mga Manggagawa	34,338	0.09	New	0	0
Ako Breeder Party-List	32,630	0.09	New	0	0
Ako Musikero Association	28,297	0.08	New	0	0
Philippine Society for Industrial Security	27,851	0.08	New	0	0
Ang Koalisyon ng Indigenous People	27,583	0.08	New	0	0
Aksyon Magsasaka-Partido Tinig ng Masa	27,364	0.08	−0.62	0	0
Mindoro Sandugo para sa Kaunlaran	26,800	0.07	New	0	0
Samahang Ilaw at Bisig	25,871	0.07	New	0	0
1-UTAP Bicol	23,021	0.06	−0.02	0	0
Alagaan ang Sambayanang Pilipino	22,543	0.06	New	0	0
Parents Teachers Alliance	22,319	0.06	−0.04	0	0
APAT-DAPAT Partylist	20,949	0.06	New	0	0
Arts Business and Science Professionals	20,149	0.06	−0.06	0	0
ARISE Partylist	20,131	0.06	New	0	0
Maagap Partylist	19,645	0.05	New	0	0
Solid Change Partylist	18,954	0.05	New	0	0
Marvelous Tayo	18,172	0.05	+0.01	0	0
Alternatiba ng Masa	18,048	0.05	New	0	0
Partido Lakas ng Masa	17,783	0.05	−0.05	0	0
PASADA CC Partylist	17,406	0.05	New	0	0
UFCC Party-List	16,733	0.05	New	0	0
AKAP Pinoy Partylist	16,116	0.04	New	0	0
PVAID Partylist	14,330	0.04	New	0	0
National Firemen's Confederation of the Philippines	11,692	0.03	New	0	0
LIBRO Partylist	11,067	0.03	New	0	0
1 Tahanan	10,383	0.03	New	0	0
Pilipinas para sa Pinoy	8,774	0.02	−0.03	0	0
Aangat Kusinerong Pinoy	8,261	0.02	New	0	0
Kusog Bikolandia	7,840	0.02	New	0	0
Total	36,416,604	100.00	–	63	+2
Valid votes	36,416,604	65.45	+6.49		
Invalid/blank votes (Note: Includes 385,460 votes for An Waray, which COMELEC had cancelled its certificate of registration in August 2023, after it had allowed its nominee Victoria Isabel Noel assume a seat in the House of Representatives starting in 2016 without proper authority. The House of Representatives then dropped from the rolls Bem Noel in September 2023, removing him from office. The Supreme Court affirmed the COMELEC's decision in September 2024.)	19,226,791	34.55	−6.49		
Total votes	55,643,395	100.00	–		
Registered voters/turnout	67,523,697	82.41	+8.67		
Source: COMELEC

Vote share
ACT-CIS	5.74%
1-RIDER	2.72%
TINGOG	2.41%
4Ps	2.30%
AKB	2.22%
SAGIP	2.12%
Others	82.49%

Party-list seats
ACT-CIS	4.76%
1-RIDER	3.17%
TINGOG	3.17%
4Ps	3.17%
AKB	3.17%
SAGIP	3.17%
Others	79.37%

==== Results per province ====
ACT-CIS Partylist

1-Rider Partylist

Tingog Party List

4Ps Party-list

Ako Bicol

SAGIP Partylist

Ang Probinsyano Party-list

Uswag Ilonggo

Tutok To Win Party-List

CIBAC

Senior Citizens Partylist

Duterte Youth

Agimat Partylist

Kabataan

ANGAT

Marino Party List

Ako Bisaya

Probinsyano Ako

LPGMA Partylist

API

Gabriela Women's Party

CWS

AGRI Partylist

P3PWD

Ako Ilocano Ako

== Defeated incumbents ==
=== Elections in districts ===
These include incumbents who ran and lost while running within a congressional district.

1. Bulacan–1st: Jose Antonio Sy-Alvarado (PDP–Laban)
2. Catanduanes: Hector Sanchez (Lakas)
3. Ilocos Norte–1st: Ria Christina Fariñas (PDP–Laban)
4. Ilocos Sur–1st: Deogracias Victor Savellano (Nacionalista)
5. La Union–2nd: Sandra Eriguel (Lakas)
6. Maguindanao–1st: Datu Roonie Sinsuat Sr. (UBJP)
7. Manila–1st: Manny Lopez (PDP–Laban)
8. Manila–5th: Cristal Bagatsing (NUP)
9. Misamis Occidental–1st: Diego Ty (NUP)
10. Negros Occidental–5th: Maria Lourdes Arroyo (Lakas/UNEGA)
11. Nueva Ecija–4th: Maricel Natividad-Nagaño (Unang Sigaw)
12. Palawan–3rd: Gil Acosta Jr. (PPPalawan)
13. Pangasinan–2nd: Jumel Anthony Espino (PDP–Laban)
14. Quezon–3rd: Aleta Suarez (Lakas)
15. Quezon City–1st: Anthony Peter Crisologo (Lakas)
16. Quezon City–2nd: Precious Hipolito (Lakas)
17. Quezon City–3rd: Allan Benedict Reyes (NPC)
18. Quezon City–4th: Bong Suntay (PDP–Laban)
19. Samar–1st: Edgar Mary Sarmiento (NUP)
20. Surigao del Sur–1st: Prospero Pichay Jr. (Lakas)
21. Zamboanga del Sur–2nd: Leonardo Babasa Jr. (Lakas)

=== Party-list election ===
These include incumbents who have not been elected in the party-list election, either because their party lost all seats, or lost enough seats, including the incumbent's own.

1. Michael Edgar Aglipay (DIWA)
2. Naella Aguinaldo (BAHAY)
3. Manuel Cabochan III (Magdalo)
4. Adriano Ebcas (Ako Padayon Pilipino)
5. Ferdinand Gaite (Bayan Muna)
6. Godofredo Guya (RECOBODA)
7. Aloy Lim (RAM)
8. Bobby Pacquiao (OFW Family Club)
9. Amihilda Sangcopan (Anak Mindanao)
10. Maria Victoria Umali (A TEACHER)
11. Carlos Isagani Zarate (Bayan Muna)

== Aftermath ==
With the victory of his cousin, Bongbong Marcos, as president, outgoing majority leader Martin Romualdez was pushed by the National Unity Party (NUP) to lead the House of Representatives. Another candidate is Gloria Macapagal Arroyo, who served as speaker during the 17th Congress, and endorsed Romualdez for speaker in the 18th. Another potential candidate is current speaker Lord Allan Velasco of the ruling PDP–Laban, while both Arroyo and Romualdez are from Lakas–CMD.

A few days after the NUP endorsement, Arroyo herself endorsed Romualdez for the speakership, advising the Lakas congressmen to vote for Romualdez in the speakership election. Following the Arroyo endorsement, PDP–Laban also endorsed Romualdez for the speakership. The Party-list Coalition also gave their endorsement to Romualdez, while announcing that Elizaldy Co, representative for Ako Bikol, will be their leader in the 19th Congress, replacing Mikee Romero of 1-PACMAN. Later in the week, Lakas released a statement that said that the Nationalist People's Coalition (NPC) also endorsed Romauldez's speakership ambitions, with NPC chairman Tito Sotto announcing in a separate statement the "unconditional support of the party to the Speakership of Congressman Martin Romualdez." A few days later, PDP–Laban announced its support for Romauldez's speakership.
