= Luz Mercado =

Filipino politician (born 1954)

Luz V. Mercado
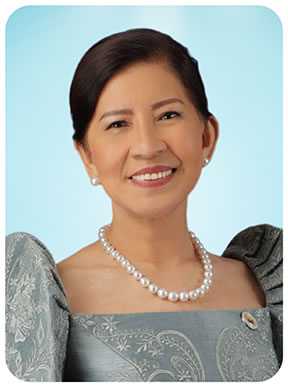
- Official portrait, 2022

Mayor of Maasin
- Incumbent
- Assumed office June 30, 2025
- Preceded by: Nacional Mercado

Member of the Philippine House of Representatives from Southern Leyte's 1st congressional district
- In office June 30, 2022 – June 30, 2025
- Preceded by: District established
- Succeeded by: Roger Mercado

Personal details
- Born: Luz Verano; May 23, 1954 (age 72) Maasin, Leyte, Philippines
- Party: Lakas–CMD (2024–present)
- Other political affiliations: NUP (until 2024)
- Spouse: Roger Mercado
- Occupation: Politician

Luz Verano Mercado (born May 23, 1954) is a Filipino politician who is the mayor of Maasin since 2025. She also represented Southern Leyte's 1st congressional district from 2022 to 2025.

== Early life ==
Luz Mercado was born in Maasin, Leyte, Philippines.

== Career ==
=== Congresswoman ===
Luz Mercado ran for Congresswoman of the newly established Southern Leyte's 1st congressional district under the National Unity Party against Vicente Geraldo and won, with 74,693 votes or 88.93 percent of the votes. She became the first representative of the district.

Luz Mercado passed 97 bills, including:

- HB00004 - AN ACT PROVIDING PROTECTION TO CONSUMERS AND MERCHANTS ENGAGED IN INTERNET TRANSACTIONS, CREATING FOR THE PURPOSE THE ELECTRONIC COMMERCE BUREAU, AND APPROPRIATING FUNDS THEREFOR
- HB00102 - AN ACT REGULATING THE SALE OF CASKETS BY FUNERAL ESTABLISHMENTS TO ENSURE AVAILABILITY OF AFFORDABLE CASKETS, AND APPROPRIATING FUNDS THEREFOR AND FOR OTHER PURPOSES
- HB00198 - AN ACT PROVIDING FOR THE REVISED WAREHOUSE RECEIPTS LAW OF THE PHILIPPINES

== Personal life ==
Luz Mercado is married to former Secretary of Public Works and Highways and Lone District Congressman Roger Mercado. Her sons include Maasin Mayor Nacional “Nikko” Mercado and Maasin Councilor Mikhael Leonardo “Mikee” Mercado. Her brother-in-law is Governor Damian Mercado.

Political offices
Preceded by Nacional Mercado	Mayor of Maansin; 2025–present	Incumbent
House of Representatives of the Philippines
New title	Member of the House of Representatives from Southern Leyte's 1st district 2022–2025	Succeeded by Roger Mercado
