= Southern Leyte's 1st congressional district =

Legislative district of the Philippines

- Constituency for the House of Representatives of the Philippines
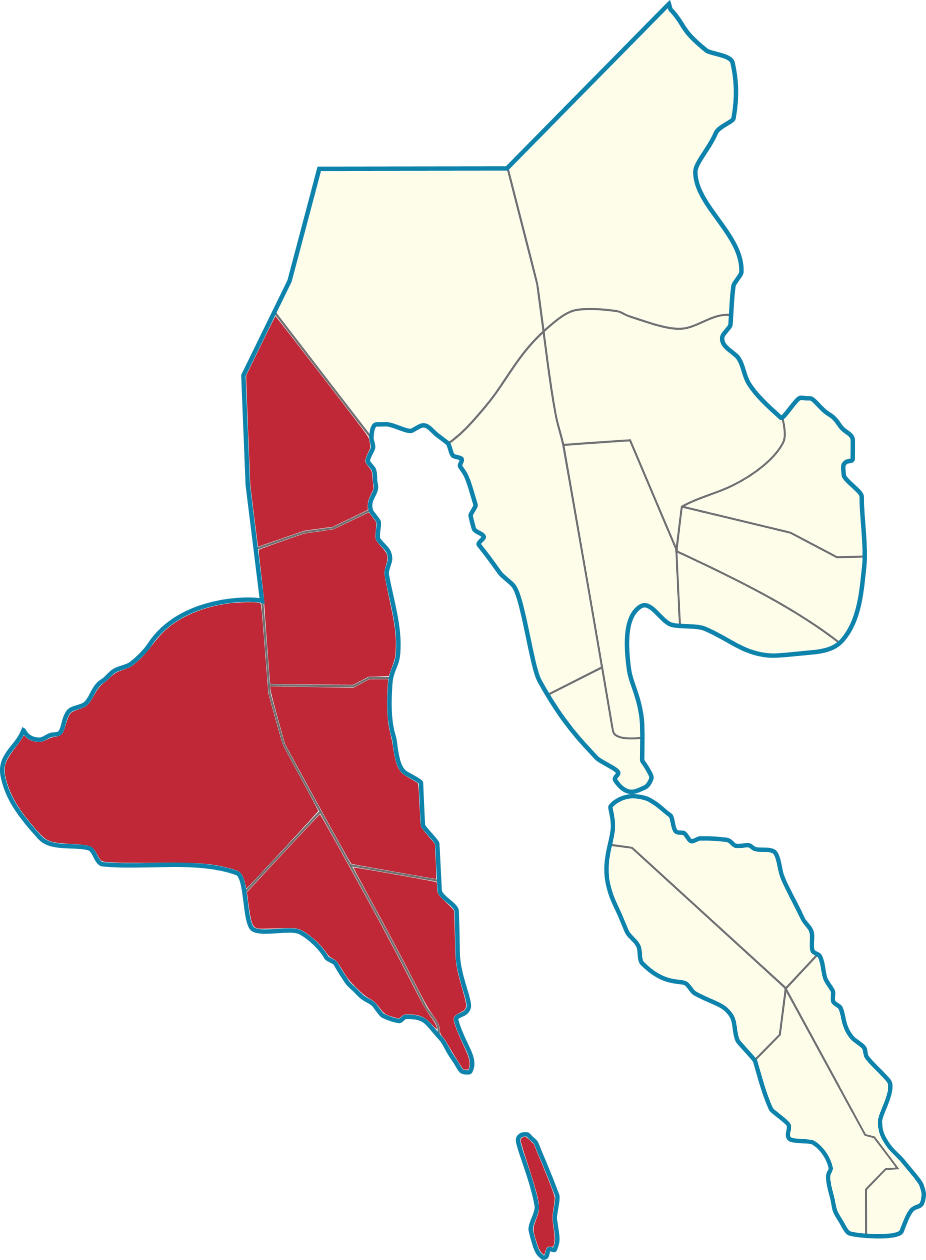
- Boundary of the congressional district in the province
- Province: Southern Leyte
- Region: Eastern Visayas
- Population: 201,421 (2020)
- Electorate: 133,753 (2022)
- Major settlements: 7 LGUs: Cities; Maasin; Municipalities; Bontoc; Limasawa; Macrohon; Malitbog; Padre Burgos; Tomas Oppus
- Area: 603.91 km^{2} (233.17 sq mi)

Current constituency
- Created: 2019
- Representative: Roger Mercado
- Political party: PFP
- Congressional bloc: Majority

Southern Leyte's 1st legislative district is one of the two congressional districts of the Philippines in the province of Southern Leyte. The district has been represented in the lower house of the Congress since 2022. Established in 2019, it is composed of the city of Maasin and the municipalities of Bontoc, Limasawa, Macrohon, Malitbog, Padre Burgos, and Tomas Oppus. It is currently represented in the 20th Congress by Roger Mercado of the Partido Federal ng Pilipinas (PFP).

== Representation history ==
#	Image	Member	Term of office		Congress	Party	Electoral history	Constituent LGUs
#	Image	Member	Start	End	Congress	Party	Electoral history	Constituent LGUs
District created February 1, 2019 from Southern Leyte's at-large district.
1		Luz Mercado	June 30, 2022	June 30, 2025	19th	NUP	Elected in 2022.	2022–present: Bontoc, Limasawa, Maasin, Macrohon, Malitbog, Padre Burgos, Tomas Oppus
1		Luz Mercado	June 30, 2022	June 30, 2025	19th	Lakas	Elected in 2022.	2022–present: Bontoc, Limasawa, Maasin, Macrohon, Malitbog, Padre Burgos, Tomas Oppus
2		Roger Mercado	June 30, 2025	Incumbent	20th	NPC	Elected in 2025.	2022–present: Bontoc, Limasawa, Maasin, Macrohon, Malitbog, Padre Burgos, Tomas Oppus
2		Roger Mercado	June 30, 2025	Incumbent	20th	PFP	Elected in 2025.	2022–present: Bontoc, Limasawa, Maasin, Macrohon, Malitbog, Padre Burgos, Tomas Oppus

== Election results ==
=== 2025 ===
Candidate	Party	Votes	%
Roger Mercado	Nationalist People's Coalition	68,306	68.62
Marisa Lerias	Katipunan ng Nagkakaisang Pilipino	29,109	29.24
Oscar Camus	Independent	2,122	2.13
Total		99,537	100.00
Registered voters/turnout		134,738	–
Nationalist People's Coalition gain from Lakas–CMD			
Source: Commission on Elections

=== 2022 ===
2022 Philippine House of Representatives elections
Party	Candidate	Votes	%
NUP	Luz Mercado	74,693	88.14%
Independent	Vicente Geraldo	10,094	11.91%
Total votes		84,787	100.00%
NUP win (new seat)			

== See also ==
- Legislative districts of Southern Leyte
