= Agimat Partylist =

Political party in the Philippines

Agimat
- — Philippine partylist —
- Full name: Agimat ng Masa
- Sector(s) represented: Multi-sector
- Founder: Ramon Revilla Sr.
- Founded: 2011; 15 years ago
- COMELEC accreditation: 2021; 5 years ago
- Headquarters: Bacoor, Cavite
- Colors: Red, Blue

Current representation (20th Congress)
- Seats in the House of Representatives: 1 / 3 (Out of 63 party-list seats)
- Representative(s): Bryan Revilla

Website
- agimatpartylist.org.ph

The Agimat ng Masa (lit. 'Agimat of the Masses'), also known as the Agimat Partylist, is a political organization with party-list representation in the House of Representatives of the Philippines.

== Background ==
The Agimat ng Masa was formally established as a social organization in 2011 by actor-politician Ramon Revilla Sr. It has been conducting programs for the needy and disaster victims prior to its registration as a partylist organization. This includes health, livelihood, and education programs.

== Electoral history ==
=== 2022 elections ===
Agimat participated in the 2022 elections for a seat in the House of Representatives. It characterize itself as a multi-sector partylist since it aims to cater to the interests of various groups including the private and public sector, farmers, fisherfolk, professionals, small to medium scale industry workers, the elderly, the youth, and the persons with disabilities. Agimat has come up with a Workers, Health and Economic Agenda which it seeks to implement once elected

Agimat's campaign benefitted from Agimat ng Agila, which starred Bong Revilla according to the actor's son and partylist nominee Bryan Revilla. Bryan remarked that the popularity of the series as well as the association of "Agimat" to his grandfather Ramon Revilla Sr helped provide name recall to potential voters. Bong Revilla himself also helped in the campaign.

The group managed to secure a seat after garnering 586,909 votes. The seat is to be filled by Bryan Revilla the fifth nominee. While Revilla has stated that Agimat's first to fourth nominees have withdrawn after the partylist was proclaimed, he has been presented by Agimat as its first nominee.

== Electoral performance ==
Election	Votes	%	Party-list seats
2022	586,909	1.59%	1 / 63
2025	420,813	1.00%	1 / 63

== Representatives to Congress ==
Period	Representative
19th Congress; 2022–2025	Bryan Revilla
20th Congress; 2025–2028	Bryan Revilla
Note: A party-list group, can win a maximum of three seats in the House of Representatives.
