= Damian Mercado =

Filipino politician (born 1954)

The Honorable Damian Mercado
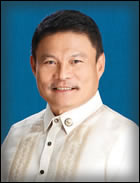
- Official portrait during the 16th Congress

Governor of Southern Leyte
- Incumbent
- Assumed office June 30, 2016; Suspended from August 10, 2017 to October 31, 2018
- Vice Governor: Christopherson Yap (2016–2022); Rosa Emilia Mercado (2022–present)
- Preceded by: Roger Mercado
- In office June 30, 2007 – June 30, 2013
- Vice Governor: Miguel Maamo II
- Preceded by: Rosette Lerias
- Succeeded by: Roger Mercado

Member of the Philippine House of Representatives from Southern Leyte's at-large congressional district
- In office June 30, 2013 – June 30, 2016
- Preceded by: Roger Mercado
- Succeeded by: Roger Mercado

Mayor of Maasin
- In office June 30, 1998 – June 30, 2007

Personal details
- Born: November 24, 1954 (age 71) Maasin, Leyte, Philippines
- Party: Lakas–CMD (2008–2011; 2024–present)
- Other political affiliations: PFP (2023–2024); PDP–Laban (2016–2023); Liberal (2013–2016); NUP (2011–2013); Lakas–NUCD–UMDP (1997–2008)

Damian Gaviola Mercado (born November 24, 1954) is a Filipino politician from the province of Southern Leyte in the Philippines. He currently serves as the Governor of Southern Leyte since 2016 and previously from 2007 to 2013. He also served as representative of the province from 2013 to 2016 and Mayor of Maasin from 1998 to 2007.

On August 10, 2017, Mercado was dismissed and preventively suspended as governor by the Ombudsman of the Philippines for alleged misconduct related to a 2007 vehicle procurement during his term as Maasin mayor. However, his suspension was overturned by the Court of Appeals in May 22, 2018, reinstating him as governor by the Department of the Interior and Local Government (DILG) on October 31, 2018. Under Philippine law, preventive suspension doesn’t interrupt an official’s term, so Mercado remained eligible to seek re-election as governor in 2025, which he won.

Political offices
Preceded by Rosette Lerias	Governor of Southern Leyte; 2007–2013	Succeeded by Roger Mercado
Preceded by Roger Mercado	Governor of Southern Leyte; 2016–present	Incumbent
House of Representatives of the Philippines
Preceded by Roger Mercado	Member of the House of Representatives from Southern Leyte's Lone district 2013–2016	Succeeded by Roger Mercado
