= Roger Mercado =

Filipino lawyer and politician (born 1951)

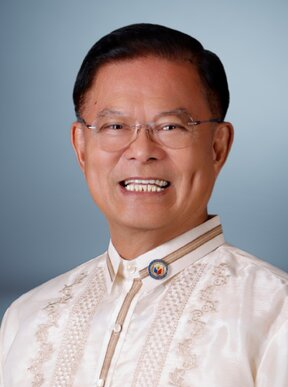
- Official portrait, 2026

Member of the Philippine House of Representatives from Southern Leyte's 1st congressional district
- Incumbent
- Assumed office June 30, 2025
- Preceded by: Luz Mercado

Member of the Philippine House of Representatives from Southern Leyte's at-large congressional district
- In office June 30, 2016 – October 13, 2021
- Preceded by: Damian Mercado
- Succeeded by: District dissolved
- In office June 30, 2004 – June 30, 2013
- Preceded by: Aniceto G. Saludo Jr.
- Succeeded by: Damian Mercado
- In office June 30, 1992 – June 30, 1998
- Preceded by: Rosette Lerias
- Succeeded by: Aniceto G. Saludo Jr.
- In office June 30, 1987 – October 15, 1991
- Preceded by: Nicanor Yñiguez
- Succeeded by: Rosette Lerias

Governor of Southern Leyte
- In office June 30, 2013 – June 30, 2016
- Vice Governor: Sheferred Lino Tan
- Preceded by: Damian Mercado
- Succeeded by: Damian Mercado

Secretary of Public Works and Highways
- In office October 13, 2021 – June 30, 2022
- President: Rodrigo Duterte
- Preceded by: Mark Villar
- Succeeded by: Manuel Bonoan

Personal details
- Born: Roger Gaviola Mercado; August 29, 1951 (age 75) Maasin, Leyte, Philippines
- Party: PFP (2026–present)
- Other political affiliations: See list: NPC (2024–2026); Lakas–CMD (2008–2011; 2019–2024); PDP–Laban (2018–2019); NUP (2011–2013); Lakas–NUCD/Lakas–CMD (1992–2008); LDP (1989–1992); Liberal (1988; 2013–2018); Lakas ng Bayan (1987)
- Spouse: Luz Mercado
- Education: Silliman University (AB); San Beda University (LLB); National Defense College of the Philippines (MNSA); Development Academy of the Philippines (MPM)

Roger "Oging" Gaviola Mercado (born August 29, 1951) is a Filipino lawyer and politician who is currently congressman of Southern Leyte's 1st district since 2025. He served as congressman of Southern Leyte's at-large district from 1987 to 1991, 1992 to 1998, 2004 to 2013, and 2016 to 2021, as well as Governor of Southern Leyte from 2013 to 2016. He was appointed by President Rodrigo Duterte as the Secretary of Public Works and Highways, serving from 2021 to 2022.

== Early life and education ==
Mercado studied elementary at Maasin Central School from 1958 to 1964, he studied high school at St. Joseph College from 1964 to 1968, he studied political science at Silliman University from 1969 to 1977, he studied for a master's in national security administration at the National Defense College of the Philippines, and he studied AFP Command and General Staff Course Class 68-2021 Armed Forces of the Philippines Education Training and Doctrine Command and General Staff College for a master's in public management, majoring in development and security, at the Development Academy of the Philippines from 2020 to 2021.

== Career ==
=== House of Representatives (1987–1991, 1992–1998, 2004–2013) ===
As a member of Lakas ng Bayan, Mercado initially won as representative of Southern Leyte's lone congressional district in the 1987 Philippine House of Representatives elections. During his tenure as congressman, he was a member in the House Committee on Labor and Employment, the House Committee on Science and Technology, the House Committee on Justice, the House Committee on Suffrage and Electoral Reform, the House Committee of Trade and Industry, the House Committee of Ways and Means, and the House Committee on Sports. He opposed the Presidential Commission Against Graft. On October 15, 1991, however, the Supreme Court declared Mercado's electoral opponent Rosette Lerias as having won the 1987 election by 146 votes.

Mercado won a fresh term as representative of Southern Leyte's lone district in 1992. He was later named chair of the House Agrarian Reform Committee. He was re-elected in 1995.

Mercado ran for governor in the 2001 Philippine general election, losing to Rosette Lerias of the Nationalist People's Coalition, with him running with Lakas-CMD again. He gained 65,522 votes while Lerias gained 67,047 votes.

He later returned to Congress, having been elected for the lone district of Southern Leyte conce again in 2004. He was re-elected in 2007 and 2010.

=== Governor of Southern Leyte (2013–2016) ===
In 2013, Mercado was successfully elected Governor of Southern Leyte, succeeding his brother Damian. He opted not to seek re-election to run for representative in 2016, which he would win.

=== House of Representatives (2016–2021) ===
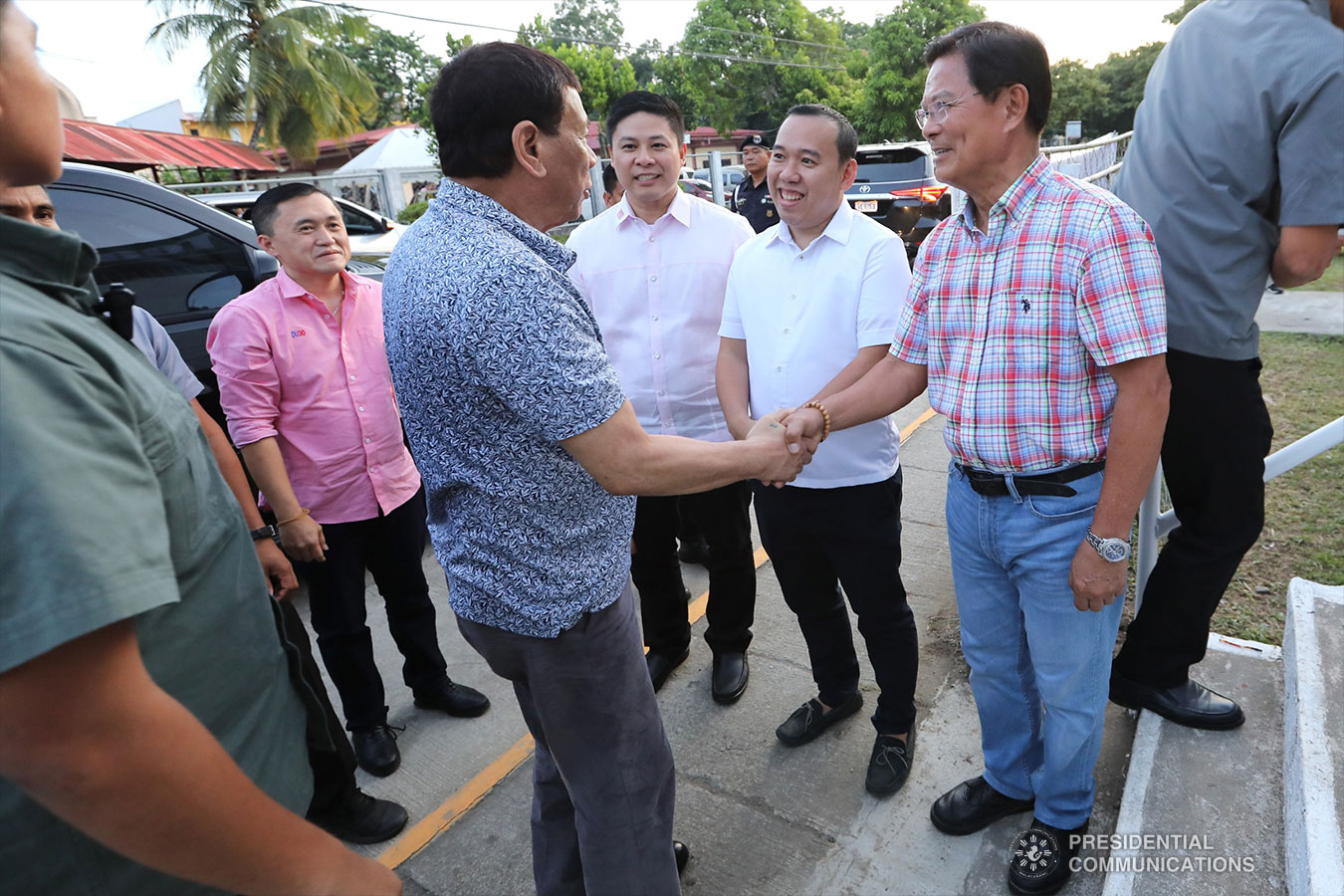
Mercado (right) shaking hands wih President Rodrigo Duterte during the 58th founding anniversary of Southern Leyte at the Provincial Capitol grounds on July 2, 2018

Elected in 2016, Mercado was re-elected as representative in 2019 under the ruling PDP–Laban. In December 2019, he left PDP-Laban to return to the Lakas–CMD party.

=== Secretary of Public Works and Highways (2021–2022) ===
On October 12, 2021, Mercado was appointed by President Rodrigo Duterte to become the Secretary of the Department of Public Works and Highways. He succeeded Mark Villar, who resigned from the post to run for senator. Because of the appointment, he withdrew his re-election bid for representative of Southern Leyte's 1st congressional district, which was then newly redistricted. His wife, Luz Mercado, ran for the re-election bid of Mercado, eventually winning as congresswoman. He served as secretary until Duterte ended his presidential term on June 30, 2022.

=== Representative (2025–present) ===
Mercado ran for representative of Southern Leyte's 1st congressional district in 2025 and won. He would succeed his wife Luz, who decided to run for mayor of Maasin instead of seeking re-election. On May 11, 2026, Mercado voted against the second impeachment of Vice President Sara Duterte, contrasting with the favorable vote of his wife Luz during the first impeachment of Duterte in 2025.

== Controversy ==
Following the 2001 Philippine general election, Rosette Lerias, an opponent of Mercado, filed an election protest against him, citing lack of merit. Two lawyers were present, though the protest was dismissed. Following the dismissal, a proclamation was filed, which was stalled when Mercado also filed a protest on May 17, which was also dismissed. She also created an election protest in the 1987 elections, which was declined. The next year, she accused Mercado of allegedly stealing four ballot boxes, which allegedly contains more than 146 votes in favor of Lerias.

== Bibliography ==
- Congress (1987- ), Philippines (1988). The Philippine Congress, 1987-1992. Creative Computech Pub.
- Riedinger, Jeffrey M. (1995). Agrarian Reform in the Philippines: Democratic Transitions and Redistributive Reform. Stanford University Press. ISBN 978-0-8047-2530-9.
- Suarez, Rolando A. (1997). Nasa tao ang gawa, nasa Diyos ang awa (in Tagalog). Rex Bookstore, Inc. ISBN 978-971-23-2238-9.
