= Southern Leyte's at-large congressional district =

Legislative district of the Philippines

Southern Leyte's at-large congressional district refers to the lone congressional district of the Philippines in the province of Southern Leyte. It was represented in the House of Representatives of the Philippines 1961 until 2022. Southern Leyte first elected a single representative provincewide at-large representative for the 5th Congress of the Third Philippine Republic following its creation as a regular province separate from Leyte under Republic Act No. 2227 on May 22, 1959. Before 1959, its territory was represented as part of Leyte's at-large, 2nd and 3rd districts. Between 1978 and 1984, multi-seat regional delegations were formed in lieu of provinces for the Fourth Philippine Republic parliament known as the Interim Batasang Pambansa, with Southern Leyte forming part of the ten-seat Region VIII's at-large district. It was restored as a single-member district in 1984.

On February 1, 2019, Republic Act No. 11198 was signed, reapportioning Southern Leyte into two legislative districts. Due to time constraints, election to fill the seats were not fulfilled in the May 2019 election, and lone district had have a holdover position. It was instead administered in 2022.

== Representation history ==
#	Image	Member	Term of office		Congress	Party	Electoral history
#	Image	Member	Start	End	Congress	Party	Electoral history
=== Southern Leyte's at-large district for the House of Representatives of the Philippines ===
District created May 22, 1959.
1		Nicanor Yñiguez	December 30, 1961	September 23, 1972	5th	Nacionalista	Redistricted from Leyte's 3rd district and re-elected in 1961.
1		Nicanor Yñiguez	December 30, 1961	September 23, 1972	6th	Nacionalista	Re-elected in 1965.
1		Nicanor Yñiguez	December 30, 1961	September 23, 1972	7th	Nacionalista	Re-elected in 1969. Removed from office after imposition of martial law.
District dissolved into the ten-seat Region VIII's at-large district for the Interim Batasang Pambansa.
#	Image	Member	Term of office		Batasang Pambansa	Party	Electoral history
#	Image	Member	Start	End	Batasang Pambansa	Party	Electoral history
=== Southern Leyte's at-large district for the Regular Batasang Pambansa ===
District re-created February 1, 1984.
(1)		Nicanor Yñiguez	July 23, 1984	March 25, 1986	2nd	KBL	Elected in 1984.
#	Image	Member	Term of office		Congress	Party	Electoral history
#	Image	Member	Start	End	Congress	Party	Electoral history
=== Southern Leyte's at-large district for the House of Representatives of the Philippines ===
District re-created February 2, 1987.
2		Roger G. Mercado	June 30, 1987	October 15, 1991	8th	Liberal	Elected in 1987. Election annulled by House electoral tribunal following an electoral protest.
3		Rosette Yñiguez Lerias	December 4, 1991	June 30, 1992	8th	KBL	Declared winner of 1987 elections.
(2)		Roger G. Mercado	June 30, 1992	June 30, 1998	9th	LDP	Elected in 1992.
(2)		Roger G. Mercado	June 30, 1992	June 30, 1998	10th	Lakas	Re-elected in 1995.
4		Aniceto G. Saludo Jr.	June 30, 1998	June 30, 2004	11th	PMP	Elected in 1998.
4		Aniceto G. Saludo Jr.	June 30, 1998	June 30, 2004	12th	PMP	Re-elected in 2001.
(2)		Roger G. Mercado	June 30, 2004	June 30, 2013	13th	Lakas	Elected in 2004.
(2)		Roger G. Mercado	June 30, 2004	June 30, 2013	14th	Lakas	Re-elected in 2007.
(2)		Roger G. Mercado	June 30, 2004	June 30, 2013	15th	NUP	Re-elected in 2010.
5		Damian G. Mercado	June 30, 2013	June 30, 2016	16th	NUP	Elected in 2013.
(2)		Roger G. Mercado	June 30, 2016	October 13, 2021	17th	Liberal	Elected in 2016.
(2)		Roger G. Mercado	June 30, 2016	October 13, 2021	17th	PDP–Laban	Elected in 2016.
(2)		Roger G. Mercado	June 30, 2016	October 13, 2021	18th	Lakas	Re-elected in 2019. Resigned on appointment as acting Secretary of Public Works and Highways.
—	vacant		October 13, 2021	June 30, 2022	18th		No special election held to fill vacancy.
District dissolved into Southern Leyte's 1st and 2nd districts.

== Election results ==
=== 2016 ===
2016 Philippine House of Representatives elections
Party	Candidate	Votes	%
Liberal	Roger Mercado	123,806	65.23%
UNA	Rico Rentuza	65,998	34.77%
Valid ballots		189,804	84.38%
Margin of victory		57,808	30.46%
Invalid or blank votes		35,132	15.62%
Total votes		224,936	100.00%
Liberal hold			

=== 2013 ===
2013 Philippine House of Representatives elections
Party	Candidate	Votes	%
NUP	Damian Mercado	85,919	48.46
Akbayan	Rico Rentuza	34,239	19.31
Liberal	Marisa Lerias	31,640	17.85
Independent	Vicente Geraldo	885	0.50
Margin of victory		51,680	29.15%
Invalid or blank votes		24,612	13.88
Total votes		177,295	100.00
NUP hold			

=== 2010 ===
2010 Philippine House of Representatives elections
Party	Candidate	Votes	%
Lakas–Kampi	Roger Mercado	125,912	66.60
PMP	Aniceto Saludo	61,595	32.58
Independent	Vicente Geraldo	961	0.51
Independent	Jeffren Roden	590	0.31
Valid ballots		189,058	91.53
Invalid or blank votes		17,500	8.47
Total votes		206,558	100.00
Lakas–Kampi hold			

== See also ==
- Legislative districts of Southern Leyte

House of Representatives of the Philippines
Preceded by Region IV as Home district of the speaker of the Interim Batasang Pambansa	Home district of the speaker of the Regular Batasang Pambansa; July 23, 1984 – March 25, 1986	Succeeded by Palawan's 2nd congressional district as Home district of the speaker of the House of Representatives of the Philippines
