= Maasin =

Capital city of Southern Leyte, Philippines

- Component city
- City of Maasin
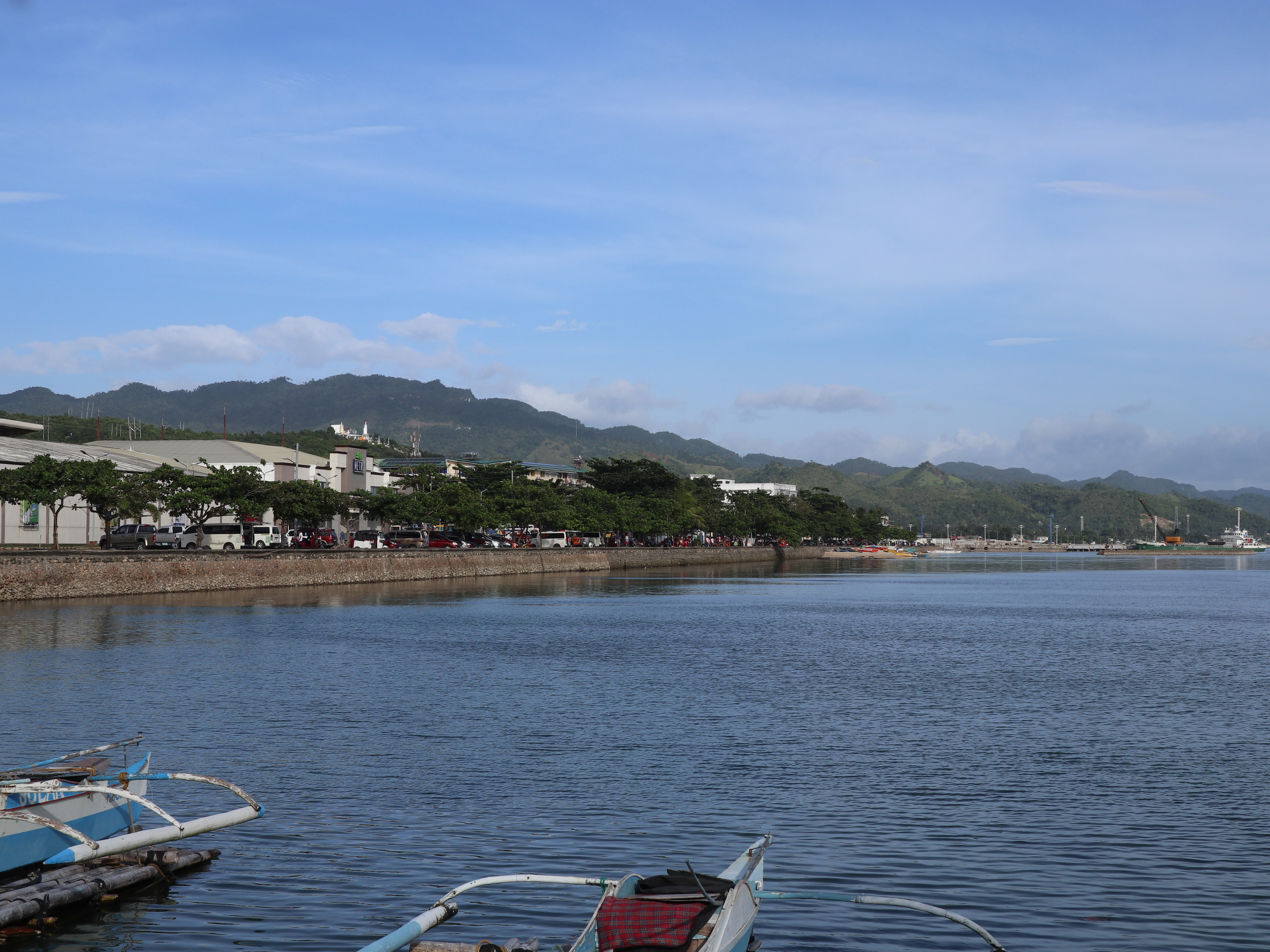
- Maasin City proper viewed from the coast

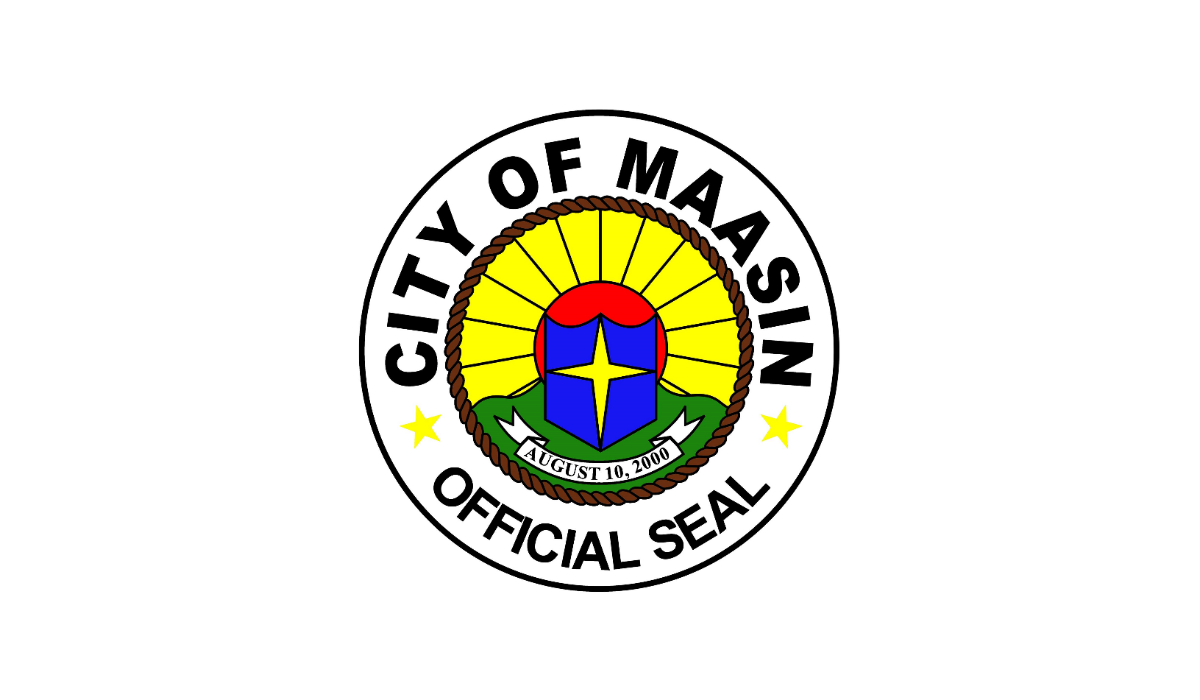
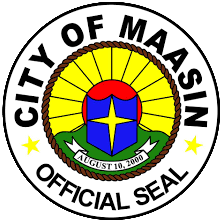
- Flag Seal
- Nickname: The City of Faith
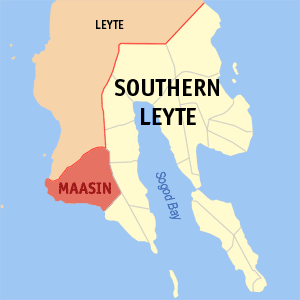
- Map of Southern Leyte with Maasin highlighted
- Interactive map of Maasin
- Location within the Philippines
- Coordinates: 10°08′N 124°51′E
- Country: Philippines
- Region: Eastern Visayas
- Province: Southern Leyte
- District: 1st district
- Founded: 1770
- Cityhood: August 10, 2000
- Barangays: 70 (see Barangays)

Government
  - Type: Sangguniang Panlungsod
  - Mayor: Luz Mercado (Lakas)
  - Vice Mayor: Effie Abiera-Sabandal (NP)
  - Representative: Roger Mercado (NPC)
  - City Council: Members: Maria Effie L. Abiera; Margarita A. Bantug; Jezzene Gail R. Paler; Mikhael V. Mercado; Luzviminda T. Rosete; Isagani M. Mercado; Vivencio C. Costillas; Rafael Cromwell T. Gerong; Zaldy L. Olita; Melvin M. Dublan
  - Electorate: 56,852 voters (2025)

Area
  - Total: 211.71 km^{2} (81.74 sq mi)
- Elevation: 77 m (253 ft)
- Highest elevation: 704 m (2,310 ft)
- Lowest elevation: 0 m (0 ft)

Population (2024 census)
  - Total: 85,486
  - Density: 403.79/km^{2} (1,045.8/sq mi)
  - Households: 20,206
- Demonym: Maasinhon

Economy
  - Income class: 3rd city income class
  - Poverty incidence: 16.38% (2023)
  - Revenue: ₱ 242.7 million (2024)
  - Assets: ₱ 4,974 million (2024)
  - Expenditure: ₱ 703 million (2024)
  - Liabilities: ₱ 719.2 million (2024)

Service provider
  - Electricity: Southern Leyte Electric Cooperative (SOLECO)
- Time zone: UTC+8 (PST)
- ZIP code: 6600
- PSGC: 086407000
- IDD : area code: +63 (0)53
- Native languages: Boholano dialect Cebuano; Tagalog

Maasin (IPA: [mɐˈʔasin]), officially the City of Maasin (Cebuano: Dakbayan sa Maasin; Waray: Syudad han Maasin, Filipino: Lungsod ng Maasin), is a component city and capital of the province of Southern Leyte, Philippines. According to the 2024 census, it has a population of 85,486 people.

It has 70 barangays and is located in the western part of the province with land area of 21,171 hectares (52,310 acres).

Maasin is the largest city, commercial and religious center of Southern Leyte and the south-western part of Leyte Island. On August 10, 2000, Maasin was converted into a city. The Diocese of Maasin was founded on August 14, 1968.

It is known as the birthplace of Rodrigo Duterte, the 16th President of the Philippines.

== History ==
Little is known about Maasin's pre-Spanish existence. When the Spanish missionaries became active in their missions, they discovered that the locals were already organized, with its people interested in embracing the Catholic faith. The community was formally established as a parish by the missionaries of the Society of Jesus in the 1700s and was called "nipa." This was authenticated by a piece of stone from a long destroyed convent that bears the inscription: "Pa. De Tagnipa - año 1776."

The naming of the town of Maasin is related to the incident when some Spaniards who needed drinking water scanned the shorelines and found Canturing River. They asked the natives in Castilian Spanish while gesturing towards the river, "Que pueblo es este?" Without hesitation, the natives answered "Maasin," meaning salty, mistakenly thinking that the Spaniards were asking them how the water tasted.

During the Spanish period, much of Southern Leyte was sparsely populated. Continued Moro slave raiding discouraged the establishment and stabilization of large towns.

The town grew rapidly in the 1700s after the Jesuit priests built the first church of which ruins still exists today between the two districts of Abgao and Mantahan. The Jesuit administration prevailed from 1700 through 1768. Subsequently, Augustinian fathers took over the parish from 1768 to 1843 during which the towns people, with the guidance of the Spanish ecclesiastical authorities, built the town's second concrete church located approximately one kilometer away from the ruins of the first one. The church stands to this day; although it underwent several repairs and renovations on account of damage wrought by the forces of nature and man-made events. In 1843, Franciscan missionaries took over the parish and managed it until 1896 when they were forced to abandon it due to the revolution. A native clergy took over there after.

A historical proof of this account is a document that depicts a record of "gobernacillos" in this municipality in 1880 through 1894. By virtue of the Maura Code passed by the Cortes Generales, the first chosen local executive was changed from Gobernadorcillo to "Capitan Municipal". The last gobernadorcillo was Alejo Alcantara who served from 1892 to 1894, followed by Capitanes Municipal Julio Raagas (1894–1896) and Flaviano Aguilar (1897–1898).

In the 19th century, Maasin evolved and became an organized municipality. It became a busy seaport which maintained trading with nearby islands of Cebu, Bohol, and Mindanao. Immigration from those regions increased the population of the region and opened the land towards farming.

The short-lived Philippine revolution against Spain brought about a change in the local government. During the early part of 1899, General Lukban came to Maasin to install the municipal government under the short-lived Philippine Republic. Even before the fall of the Spaniards to the Americans on August 13, 1898, there had already been established in Maasin a Court of First Instance; the office of "Promoter Fiscal" (equivalent to the Provincial Fiscal); and, the office of "Administrador de Hacienda" (equivalent to Provincial Treasurer). With the change of sovereign power, the positions were abolished but the Fiscal's which continued to serve cases from distant towns. However, due to the problems emanating from transportation availability for the Tacloban-Maasin span, and the intricate management of governmental affairs in Tacloban, several prominent leaders on the west coast of Leyte began proposing bills that entail the division of the island of Leyte into two distinct provinces.

In 1919, Representative Ciriaco K. Kangleon presented the first bill but lost in the Senate by one vote.

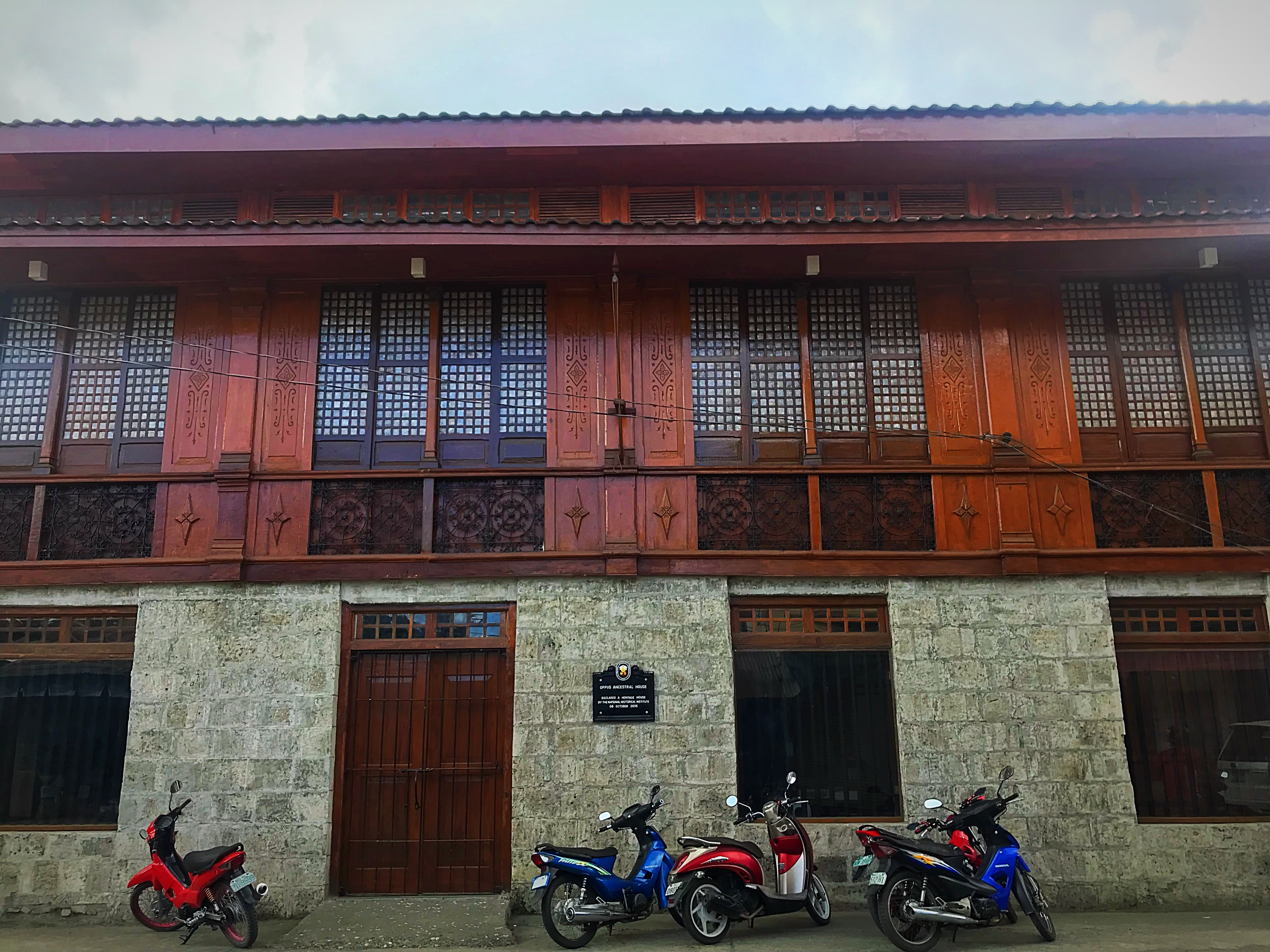
Oppus Ancestral House in Maasin

In 1922, Tomas Oppus renewed the move with presentation of House Bill No. 254 which became Act No. 3117. Unfortunately, the Act did not take effect because it was not proclaimed by the Governor-General.

The arrival of the Americans at the beginning of the 20th century and the suppression of all resistance to the American rule stopped all hopes of Philippine independence. However, the epoch-making announcement of President McKinley that the Philippines was not theirs to exploit but to train in the art of self-government and independence brought about new hope for the Filipinos. True to their word, the Americans instituted in this country their democratic institutions. Maasin was one of the beneficiaries of this enlightened American policy. Schools were established; businesses began to rise and prosper; and Maasin became one of the most progressive towns in Leyte. Maasin was enjoying the blessings of democracy up until World War II.

On June 3, 1942, the Japanese occupied Maasin and immediately instituted Martial Law. The locals realized that their immediate task was to live and escape the abuses, atrocities, and murderous acts of the Japanese soldiers. They took refuge at the mountains and hills where they would be concealed in the forests. Others however, including Colonel Ruperto Kangleon, Alfonso Cobile, fought the Japanese invaders making the Leyte guerillas one of the most valiant within the Filipino resistance.

As Maasin recovered after the war, it once again became a bustling town trading with the nearby islands of Cebu, Bohol, and Mindanao. Through the initiatives of its leaders, Maasin progressively continued to move forward in its role as the center of commerce and industry in Southern Leyte.

In 1953, Francisco M. Pajao won the re-presentation of the issue that entails the division of the island of Leyte but could not do anything else to complete the move. Hence, now Senator Ruperto K. Kangleon presented and passed the move under Senate Bill No. 2140. The House of Representatives carpeted the Bill.

Then in 1957, Congressman Nicanor Espina Yniguez Jr. filed the House Bill that changed the move's original designation as Western Leyte of Occidental Leyte to "Southern Leyte". At 10:00 AM on Friday, May 22, 1959, President Carlos P. Garcia signed the Bill into law as Republic Act No. 2227. Witnesses to the signing, among others, were Congressman Yniguez, Mayor Alfredo K. Bantug of Maasin, Attorney Manuel Enage Sr., Erlinda Capili, and Attorney Floro Kangleon.

On July 1, 1960, Southern Leyte was officially inaugurated as a province with municipalities including Maasin (being the capital town and seat of the provincial government), Malitbog, Bontoc, Sogod, Libagon, Pintuyan, San Francisco, St. Bernard, Cabalian (now San Juan), Anahawan, Hinundayan, Hinunangan, and Silago. Four more municipalities were subsequently created, namely, Macrohon (from Padre Burgos), San Ricardo (from Pintuyan), Tomas Oppus (from Malitbog), and Limasawa (from Padre Burgos).

Maasin continued to progressively prosper for decades. On April 8, 1999, Congressman Aniceto G. Saludo Jr. filed a move under House Bill No. 7201 to convert the municipality of Maasin into a component city of the province of Southern Leyte, thus becoming City of Maasin on August 10, 2000, celebrated as Charter Day.

In December 2021 the city was severely damaged by Typhoon Rai as it was directly on the storm's path, the recovery was short in the city center but it took further weeks for rural villages to recover from the storm.

== Geography ==
=== Topography ===
The terrain of Maasin City is characterized by rugged hills and mountains, typical of karst geography found throughout Visayas, while there is a flat basin in the middle of the city. It has numerous small rivers in addition to the largest and main river, Canturing river.

=== Climate ===
Climate data for Maasin (1991–2020, extremes 1973–2023)
Month	Jan	Feb	Mar	Apr	May	Jun	Jul	Aug	Sep	Oct	Nov	Dec	Year
Record high °C (°F)	36.0 (96.8)	35.4 (95.7)	34.9 (94.8)	36.3 (97.3)	36.6 (97.9)	36.8 (98.2)	35.5 (95.9)	36.4 (97.5)	36.9 (98.4)	37.8 (100.0)	37.6 (99.7)	34.6 (94.3)	37.8 (100.0)
Mean daily maximum °C (°F)	29.5 (85.1)	30.1 (86.2)	31.0 (87.8)	32.1 (89.8)	32.6 (90.7)	31.7 (89.1)	31.1 (88.0)	31.1 (88.0)	31.1 (88.0)	31.1 (88.0)	30.8 (87.4)	29.9 (85.8)	31.0 (87.8)
Daily mean °C (°F)	26.3 (79.3)	26.6 (79.9)	27.3 (81.1)	28.2 (82.8)	28.7 (83.7)	28.1 (82.6)	27.6 (81.7)	27.7 (81.9)	27.6 (81.7)	27.6 (81.7)	27.3 (81.1)	26.7 (80.1)	27.5 (81.5)
Mean daily minimum °C (°F)	23.2 (73.8)	23.2 (73.8)	23.6 (74.5)	24.3 (75.7)	24.7 (76.5)	24.5 (76.1)	24.2 (75.6)	24.3 (75.7)	24.1 (75.4)	24.0 (75.2)	23.8 (74.8)	23.5 (74.3)	23.9 (75.0)
Record low °C (°F)	18.2 (64.8)	18.7 (65.7)	19.7 (67.5)	19.4 (66.9)	20.7 (69.3)	19.0 (66.2)	20.0 (68.0)	20.0 (68.0)	18.0 (64.4)	20.0 (68.0)	19.0 (66.2)	18.9 (66.0)	18.0 (64.4)
Average rainfall mm (inches)	298.2 (11.74)	198.2 (7.80)	142.7 (5.62)	71.9 (2.83)	95.3 (3.75)	160.6 (6.32)	209.6 (8.25)	202.6 (7.98)	236.6 (9.31)	232.8 (9.17)	213.7 (8.41)	285.6 (11.24)	2,338.8 (92.08)
Average rainy days (≥ 1 mm)	16	12	10	7	8	11	14	14	14	15	15	17	153
Average relative humidity (%)	85	85	82	76	80	82	83	84	84	84	84	85	83
Source: PAGASA

Even though March–May is considered hot and dry with temperatures ranging from 22 to 32 °C, in general terms, the city, like much of eastern Philippines, relatively has no dry season. This is due to rainfall more or less, distributed throughout the year. June to October is mostly rainy; whereas, November to February is cool with temperatures ranging from 22 to 28 °C. Year round, average humidity is about 76%.

=== Barangays ===
Maasin City is politically subdivided into 70 barangays. Each barangay consists of puroks and some have sitios.

- Abgao (Poblacion)
- Acasia
- Asuncion
- Bactul I
- Bactul II
- Badiang
- Bagtican
- Basak
- Bato I
- Bato II
- Batuan
- Baugo
- Bilibol
- Bogo
- Cabadiangan
- Cabulihan
- Cagnituan
- Cambooc
- Cansirong
- Canturing
- Canjoum
- Combado (Poblacion)
- Dongon
- Gawisan
- Guadalupe
- Hanginan
- Hantag
- Hinapu Daku
- Hinapu Gamay
- Ibarra
- Isagani (Pugaling)
- Laboon
- Lanao
- Libertad
- Libhu
- Lib-og
- Lonoy
- Lunas
- Mahayahay
- Malapoc Norte
- Malapoc Sur
- Mambajao (Poblacion)
- Manhilo
- Mantahan (Poblacion)
- Maria Clara
- Matin-ao
- Nasaug
- Nati
- Nonok Norte
- Nonok Sur
- Panan-awan
- Pansaan
- Pasay
- Pinaskohan
- Rizal
- San Agustin (Lundag)
- San Isidro
- San Jose
- San Rafael (Bantig)
- Santa Cruz
- Santo Niño
- Santa Rosa
- Santo Rosario
- Soro-soro
- Tagnipa (Poblacion)
- Tam-is
- Tawid
- Tigbawan
- Tomoy-tomoy
- Tunga-tunga (Poblacion)

== Demographics ==
Population census of Maasin
Year	Pop.	±% p.a.
1903	16,805	—
1918	22,332	+1.91%
1939	29,264	+1.30%
1948	31,458	+0.81%
1960	39,185	+1.85%
1970	50,759	+2.62%
1975	54,737	+1.52%
1980	59,731	+1.76%
1990	64,694	+0.80%
1995	63,746	−0.28%
2000	71,163	+2.39%
2007	79,737	+1.58%
2010	81,250	+0.69%
2015	85,560	+0.99%
2020	87,446	+0.46%
2024	85,486	−0.54%
Source: Philippine Statistics Authority

=== Language ===
Maasinhons and Southern Leyteños speak Cebuano. Their cultural and linguistic affinities tend to differentiate them from those who reside in Cebu, Bohol, and the western coast of the province of Leyte. Most of the people are farmers and fishermen who are noted for their hard work and frugality.

=== Religion ===
Although approximately 50% of the people are adherents of the Roman Catholic Church, traditional folk beliefs and superstition still influence some of them. Some farmers are also known to hold on to pre-and conservative beliefs in making offerings and sacrifices before planting season starts. At times, chickens or pigs are ritually offered in hopes of enticing spirits for a fruitful harvest.

==== Diocese of Maasin ====
On August 14, 1968, the Diocese of Maasin was canonically erected through a papal decree issued March 23, 1968. In June of the same year, the Most Reverend Vicente T. Ataviado, D.D. who then a parish priest of Masbate, Masbate, was appointed as its first bishop. He was consecrated on August 8, 1968, and installed as the First Bishop of Maasin on August 14 at Our Lady of Assumption Parish Church in Maasin, the capital of Southern Leyte.

From 1595 to 1910, the area which now comprises the Diocese of Maasin belonged to the diocese of Cebu. From 1910 to 1937 it belonged to the Diocese of Calbayog. From 1937 to 1968 it came under the jurisdiction of the Diocesan of Palo in Leyte. Today it is a suffragan of the Archdiocese of Cebu.

The diocese comprises the entire province of Southern Leyte, and the towns of Matalom, Bato, Hilongos, Hindang, Inopacan and Baybay in the province of Leyte, with the Maasin Parish Cathedral as the seat of the diocese. Distributed within its 2,505 square kilometers of land are 38 parishes and 1 quasi-parish. To facilitate administration these parishes have been grouped under 6 vicariates.

In recent years, awareness of their potent role in the local church has been perceived among the lay faithful – a result of diocesan programs designed to awaken the "sleeping giant" in the church. There has been a marked increase in the number of lay ministers to assist priests in every parish, as there has been in the number of volunteer catechists.

The Diocese of Maasin today has started to focus on the vision of the Second Plenary Council of the Philippines. Apart from the usual ministerial and sacramental functions, the clergy has succeeded to penetrate the people's conscience with concern for other issues, such as reforestation, among others.

The Social Action Center supports livelihood projects for people who lack the necessary capital, including an abaca business enterprise, and has been working to start further livelihood projects.

The Commission on Youth is helping in the formation of the youth in all the parishes of the diocese through youth encounters and leadership training. It has organized three diocesan summer youth camps between 1993 and 1995, attended by more than a thousand delegates.

In 2018 the Diocese of Maasin marked its 50th anniversary as a diocese.

== Economy ==
Poverty incidence of Maasin (%)

Source: Philippine Statistics Authority

Maasin's economic base is a mix of agriculture, aquaculture, industry, tourism, and commercial services.

The city enjoys economic growth because it's the Provincial Capital of Southern Leyte. The city has experience an Economic growth for the last couple of years with the entry of some of the Country's leading Commercial Shopping Chain the Gaisano Grand Mall Maasin and the Gaisano Metro Maasin among others like the Novo, J&F Shopping Center, Prince Warehouse, 578 Emporium and some local establishments.

== Infrastructure ==
=== Roads ===
Maasin lies in the existing road networks of Leyte island, passing through two major outlets - on the western part, the Maasin-Mahaplag-Baybay route; and, on the central part, the Mahaplag-Sogod route via the Maharlika Highway. There is also a major road linking Maasin and Bontoc although it is not a highway.

The villages and exurbs of the city is well connected by a network of paved roads, while the Maasin Bypass Road aims to redirect traffic passing through the city onto the new road by the coast. It began construction in the 2010s but due to the COVID-19 pandemic and Typhoon Rai, the completion has been delayed significantly.

=== Airport ===
The province has one existing airstrip located in Panan-awan, Maasin City. It has a runway length of 1200 meters and a width of 30 meters. There were regular scheduled flights in the 2010s between Cebu and Maasin and Tagbilaran to Maasin via Air Juan (AO), but stopped due to low demand. The airport is only used for general aviation and cannot handle aircraft weighing over 12,000 pounds. Controversies of the construction of the airport was found by COA, that lead Damian Mercado dismissed of his position.

=== Seaports ===
Weesam Express fast ferry from Maasin National Port to Cebu takes three hours, 9:00AM daily . Cokaliong Shipping 'Roll-on' ships have infrequent service to the city due to shifting demand. Cargo ships regularly make use of Maasin National Port mainly bringing in cement and taking out copra.

=== Bus Terminals ===
There are five designated bus terminals in Southern Leyte: Maasin, Liloan, Sogod, Hinunangan, and Silago. These terminals are just open spaces used by buses as parking/passenger waiting areas, and not equipped with buildings and other facilities.

There are at least four bus companies taking the Manila-Maasin route: Philtranco, DLTB, Ultrabus, and CUL. While Bachelor takes the Ormoc-Maasin-Davao route.

From the Maasin City, by land, it takes approximately five hours to travel to Tacloban City; twenty three hours to Pasay or Quezon City; and, nineteen hours to Davao City via Liloan ferry boat.

=== Power / Energy ===
The principal source of power / electricity in Southern Leyte is the Tonongan Geothermal Power Plant in Ormoc via National Power Corporation through the Southern Leyte Electric Cooperative (SOLECO). The major power transmission lines in the province emanate from 69 kV Tolosa, Leyte which is connected to 69 kV Bontoc, Southern Leyte then to Maasin City, and 69 kV Baybay, Leyte to Maasin City in case of power failure.

A mini-hydro electric power plant in Hinabian, Catmon, St. Bernard was developed with a capacity of 810 KW to serve the Pacific towns particularly St. Bernard and San Juan.

A major breakthrough in power generation is the Southern Leyte Geothermal Project in San Juan with a capacity of 50-100 megawatts commissioning in year 2003. It is anticipated to sustain an estimated economic life of 25 years. Activities involving Pre-operation Phase was already initiated.

=== Communication ===
Postal communication system is the major means of communication in all municipalities of the province. There are five telephone exchange companies operating in the province to provide domestic and international calls namely PLDT, PT&T, RCPI/Bayan Tel, Evtelco, and the Bureau of Telecommunications (Butel); two AM radio stations - DYSL in Sogod, and DYDM in Maasin City. Other modes of communication include SSB radios for government offices, and cellular phones for government and private entities. TV5, GMA Network and ABS-CBN operate upcoming TV station in the city.

=== Health Facilities ===
In 1996, the health and medical needs of the province were provided by eight government hospitals, six private hospitals and clinics, twenty rural health units or municipal centers, ninety three health stations, and ten outpatient private clinics. The total bed capacity of government hospitals is 265 while that of the private is 110. A current tally of health facilities in the province is still being determined.

Maasin City also known to be the no-smoking capital city in Eastern Visayas.

== Healthcare ==
- New Provincial Hospital - Dongon, Maasin City
- Living Hope Hospital
- Sacred Heart Hospital
- Maasin City Health Unit (3 Branches)
- Maasin Med City Hospital (formerly Maasin Maternity and Children's Hospital)
- The College of Maasin Maternity Clinic
- Malaya Medical Clinic
- Abiera Medical Clinic
- Our Lady of Assumption Parish Dialysis Center

== Notable personalities ==
- Rodrigo Duterte, 16th President of the Philippines from 2016 to 2022.
- Nicanor Espina Yñiguez, speaker of the Regular Batasang Pambansa from 1984 to 1986.
- Ramon Sadaya Fernandez, former professional basketball player and commissioner of the Philippine Sports Commission from 2016 to 2022.
