= Philippine House Committee on Ways and Means =

Standing committee of the House of Representatives of the Philippines

Committee on Ways and Means
- 20th Congress

History
- New session started: July 28, 2025

Leadership
- Chairman: Miro Quimbo

Website
- Committee on Ways and Means

The Philippine House Committee on Ways and Means, or House Ways and Means Committee is a standing committee of the Philippine House of Representatives.

== Jurisdiction ==
As prescribed by House Rules, the committee's jurisdiction is on the fiscal, monetary and financial affairs of the national government including tariff, taxation, revenues, borrowing, credit and bonded indebtedness.

== History ==
=== Assassination of Mauricio Pulhin ===
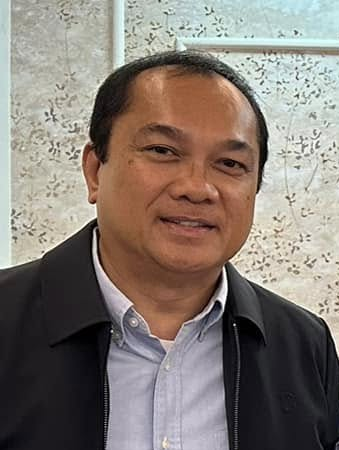
Mauricio Pulhin

In the afternoon of June 15, 2025, 61-year-old Mauricio "Morie" Pulhin, the committee's Technical Staff director, was attending his daughter's birthday party in a gated subdivision in Barangay Commonwealth, Quezon City when two motorcycle-riding assailants drove by and shot him at close range. Although he was rushed to the Far Eastern University – Nicanor Reyes Medical Foundation, he was pronounced dead upon arrival. Police officials noted that based on evidence, the shooting was carefully planned out by the assailants.

House Speaker Martin Romualdez issued a statement the next day denouncing the "brutal act of violence in the strongest possible terms" and called on the Philippine National Police (PNP) and the National Bureau of Investigation (NBI) to conduct a thorough and impartial investigation.

On June 24, police authorities separately arrested two of the seven suspected perpetrators of Pulhin's assassination, with one of the suspects, an alleged middleman given the alias "Balong", testifying that an unmarried couple were behind the attack. Balong claimed that Pulhin was targeted due to his intention to file charges of estafa and theft against the couple.

== Members, 20th Congress ==
As of June 30, 2025, all committee membership positions are vacant until the House convenes for its first regular session on July 28.

== Historical membership rosters ==
=== 19th Congress ===
Position	Members	Party	Province/City	District
Chairperson	Joey Salceda	Lakas–CMD	Albay	2nd
Vice Chairpersons	Mikaela Angela "Mika" Suansing	Lakas–CMD	Nueva Ecija	1st
Vice Chairpersons	Nicanor Briones	AGAP Partylist	Party-list	
Vice Chairpersons	Nelson Dayanghirang	Nacionalista	Davao Oriental	1st
Vice Chairpersons	Ernix Dionisio	Lakas–CMD	Manila	1st
Vice Chairpersons	Teodorico Haresco Jr.	Nacionalista	Aklan	2nd
Vice Chairpersons	Sonny Lagon	Ako Bisaya	Party-list	
Vice Chairpersons	Allan U. Ty	LPG Marketers Association	Party-list	
Vice Chairpersons	Eric Yap	Lakas–CMD	Benguet	At-large
Members for the Majority	Jose C. Alvarez	NPC	Palawan	2nd
Members for the Majority	Mercedes Alvarez-Lansang	NPC	Negros Occidental	6th
Members for the Majority	Ian Amatong	Liberal	Zamboanga del Norte	3rd
Members for the Majority	James "Jojo" Ang Jr.	Uswag Ilonggo	Party-list	
Members for the Majority	Milagros Aquino-Magsaysay	United Senior Citizens	Party-list	
Members for the Majority	Arjo Atayde	Nacionalista	Quezon City	1st
Members for the Majority	Ace Barbers	Nacionalista	Surigao del Norte	2nd
Members for the Majority	Alfel Bascug	NUP	Agusan del Sur	1st
Members for the Majority	Menchie "Ching" Bernos	Lakas–CMD	Abra	At-large
Members for the Majority	Ferjenel Biron	Nacionalista	Iloilo	4th
Members for the Majority	John Tracy Cagas	Nacionalista	Davao del Sur	At-large
Members for the Majority	Mitch Cajayon-Uy	Lakas–CMD	Caloocan	2nd
Members for the Majority	Peter John Calderon	NPC	Cebu	7th
Members for the Majority	Luis Campos	NPC	Makati	2nd
Members for the Majority	Rudy S. Caoagdan	Nacionalista	Cotabato	2nd
Members for the Majority	Solomon R. Chungalao	NPC	Ifugao	At-large
Members for the Majority	Maria Theresa Collantes	NPC	Batangas	3rd
Members for the Majority	Ambrosio C. Cruz Jr.	Lakas–CMD	Bulacan	5th
Members for the Majority	Midy Cua	Lakas–CMD	Quirino	At-large
Members for the Majority	Luisa Cuaresma	UNA	Nueva Vizcaya	At-large
Members for the Majority	Michael John "Jack" Duavit	NPC	Rizal	1st
Members for the Majority	Wilfrido Mark Enverga	NPC	Quezon	1st
Members for the Majority	Arnulf Bryan Fuentebella	NPC	Camarines Sur	4th
Members for the Majority	Greg Gasataya	NPC	Bacolod	At-large
Members for the Majority	Michael B. Gorriceta	Nacionalista	Iloilo	2nd
Members for the Majority	Ricardo T. Kho	Lakas–CMD	Masbate	1st
Members for the Majority	Roy M. Loyola	NPC	Cavite	5th
Members for the Majority	Gerville "Jinky Bitrics" Luistro	Lakas–CMD	Batangas	2nd
Members for the Majority	Marvey Mariño	Nacionalista	Batangas	5th
Members for the Majority	Rodolfo "Ompong" Ordanes	Senior Citizens	Party-list	
Members for the Majority	Rosemarie C. Panotes	Lakas–CMD	Camarines Norte	2nd
Members for the Majority	Stella Luz Quimbo	Lakas–CMD	Marikina	2nd
Members for the Majority	Ray T. Reyes	Anakalusugan	Party-list	
Members for the Majority	Marvin Rillo	Lakas–CMD	Quezon City	4th
Members for the Majority	Florida "Rida" Robes	PFP	San Jose del Monte	At-large
Members for the Majority	Rufus Rodriguez	CDP	Cagayan de Oro	2nd
Members for the Majority	Janice Salimbangon	NUP	Cebu	4th
Members for the Majority	Ron P. Salo	Kabayan	Party-list	
Members for the Majority	Lordan Suan	Lakas–CMD	Cagayan de Oro	1st
Members for the Majority	Horacio Suansing Jr.	PFP	Sultan Kudarat	2nd
Members for the Majority	Gustavo Tambunting	NUP	Parañaque	2nd
Members for the Majority	Leody F. Tarriela	PFP	Occidental Mindoro	At-large
Members for the Majority	Baby Vargas-Alfonso	Lakas–CMD	Cagayan	2nd
Members for the Majority	Rosanna "Ria" Vergara	PDP–Laban	Nueva Ecija	3rd
Members for the Majority	Sam Verzosa	Tutok to Win	Party-list	
Members for the Majority	Joseph Gilbert Violago	NUP	Nueva Ecija	2nd
Members for the Majority	Maria Carmen "Maricar" Zamora	Lakas–CMD	Davao de Oro	1st
Members for the Minority	Arlene Brosas	GABRIELA	Party-list	
Members for the Minority	Sergio Dagooc	APEC	Party-list	
Members for the Minority	Rodge Gutierrez	1-Rider	Party-list	
Members for the Minority	Wilbert T. Lee	AGRI	Party-list	
Members for the Minority	Marissa "Del Mar" Magsino	OFW	Party-list	
Members for the Minority	Jose Gay Padiernos	GP	Party-list	
Members for the Minority	Stephen Paduano	Abang Lingkod	Party-list	

=== 18th Congress ===
Position	Members	Party	Province/City	District
Chairperson	Joey Salceda	PDP–Laban	Albay	2nd
Vice Chairpersons	Estrellita Suansing	PDP–Laban	Nueva Ecija	1st
Vice Chairpersons	Sharon Garin	AAMBIS-Owa	Party-list	
Vice Chairpersons	Alyssa Sheena Tan	PFP	Isabela	4th
Vice Chairpersons	Genaro Alvarez	NPC	Negros Occidental	6th
Vice Chairpersons	Aleta Suarez	Lakas	Quezon	3rd
Vice Chairpersons	Eric Yap	ACT-CIS	Party-list	
Members for the Majority	Jose Ong Jr.	NUP	Northern Samar	2nd
Members for the Majority	Rolando M. Valeriano	NUP	Manila	2nd
Members for the Majority	Horacio Suansing Jr.	NUP	Sultan Kudarat	2nd
Members for the Majority	Micaela Violago	NUP	Nueva Ecija	2nd
Members for the Majority	Elpidio Barzaga Jr.	NUP	Cavite	4th
Members for the Majority	Janice Salimbangon	NUP	Cebu	4th
Members for the Majority	Juliette Uy	NUP	Misamis Oriental	2nd
Members for the Majority	Alfel Bascug	NUP	Agusan del Sur	1st
Members for the Majority	Corazon Nuñez-Malanyaon	Nacionalista	Davao Oriental	1st
Members for the Majority	Eduardo Gullas	Nacionalista	Cebu	1st
Members for the Majority	Raul Tupas	Nacionalista	Iloilo	5th
Members for the Majority	Michael Gorriceta	Nacionalista	Iloilo	2nd
Members for the Majority	Sabiniano Canama	Coop-NATCCO	Party-list	
Members for the Majority	Mark Go	Nacionalista	Baguio	At-large
Members for the Majority	Jose Tejada	Nacionalista	Cotabato	3rd
Members for the Majority	Sol Aragones	Nacionalista	Laguna	3rd
Members for the Majority	Joaquin Chipeco Jr.	Nacionalista	Calamba	Lone
Members for the Majority	Rudy Caoagdan	PDP–Laban	Cotabato	2nd
Members for the Majority	Lorenz Defensor	PDP–Laban	Iloilo	3rd
Members for the Majority	Anthony Peter Crisologo	NUP	Quezon City	1st
Members for the Majority	Rogelio Pacquiao	PDP–Laban	Sarangani	Lone
Members for the Majority	Alan Ecleo	PDP–Laban	Dinagat Islands	Lone
Members for the Majority	Ramon Nolasco Jr.	NUP	Cagayan	1st
Members for the Majority	Joy Myra Tambunting	NUP	Parañaque	2nd
Members for the Majority	Ria Christina Fariñas	PDP–Laban	Ilocos Norte	1st
Members for the Majority	Wilton "Tonton" T. Kho	PDP–Laban	Masbate	3rd
Members for the Majority	Jesus Manuel Suntay	PDP–Laban	Quezon City	4th
Members for the Majority	Jumel Anthony I. Espino	PDP–Laban	Pangasinan	2nd
Members for the Majority	Maria Theresa Collantes	PDP–Laban	Batangas	3rd
Members for the Majority	Joselito S. Sacdalan	PDP–Laban	Cotabato	1st
Members for the Majority	Jose Enrique Garcia III	NUP	Bataan	2nd
Members for the Majority	Michael John "Jack" Duavit	NPC	Rizal	1st
Members for the Majority	Wilfrido Mark Enverga	NPC	Quezon	1st
Members for the Majority	Jake Vincent Villa	NPC	Siquijor	Lone
Members for the Majority	Arnulf Bryan Fuentebella	NPC	Camarines Sur	4th
Members for the Majority	Cesar Jimenez Jr.	PDP–Laban	Zamboanga City	1st
Members for the Majority	Cheryl Deloso-Montalla	Liberal	Zambales	2nd
Members for the Majority	Faustino Michael Carlos Dy III	PFP	Isabela	5th
Members for the Majority	Allan Benedict Reyes	PFP	Quezon City	3rd
Members for the Majority	Kristine Singson-Meehan	Bileg Ti Ilokano	Ilocos Sur	2nd
Members for the Majority	Weslie Gatchalian	NPC	Valenzuela	1st
Members for the Majority	Sonny Lagon	Ako Bisaya	Party-list	
Members for the Majority	Jose Gay Padiernos	GP	Party-list	
Members for the Majority	Virgilio Lacson	MANILA TEACHERS	Party-list	
Members for the Majority	Michael Edgar Aglipay	DIWA	Party-list	
Members for the Majority	Jorge Antonio Bustos	PATROL	Party-list	
Members for the Majority	Jericho Jonas Nograles	PBA	Party-list	
Members for the Majority	Adriano Ebcas	AKO PADAYON	Party-list	
Members for the Majority	Ronnie Ong	Ang Probinsyano	Party-list	
Members for the Majority	Rico Geron	AGAP	Party-list	
Members for the Majority	Edcel Lagman	Liberal	Albay	1st
Members for the Majority	Victor Yap	NPC	Tarlac	2nd
Members for the Majority	Allan U. Ty	LPGMA	Party-list	
Members for the Majority	Teodorico Haresco Jr.	Nacionalista	Aklan	2nd
Members for the Minority	Stella Luz Quimbo	Liberal	Marikina	2nd
Members for the Minority	Arlene Brosas	GABRIELA	Party-list	
Members for the Minority	Alfredo Garbin Jr.	AKO BICOL	Party-list	
Members for the Minority	Alex Advincula	NUP	Cavite	3rd
Members for the Minority	Sarah Jane Elago	Kabataan	Party-list	
Members for the Minority	Lawrence Fortun	Nacionalista	Agusan del Norte	1st
Members for the Minority	Sergio Dagooc	APEC	Party-list	

== See also ==
- House of Representatives of the Philippines
- List of Philippine House of Representatives committees
