= Bernardita Ramos =

Filipina politician (1944–2020)

Member of the Philippine House of Representatives from Sorsogon's 2nd district
- In office June 30, 2019 – September 8, 2020
- Preceded by: Deogracias B. Ramos Jr.
- Succeeded by: Manuel L. Fortes, Jr.

Personal details
- Born: Ma. Bernardita Bañares Ramos; February 17, 1944 Gubat, Sorsogon, Commonwealth of the Philippines
- Died: September 8, 2020 (aged 76) Sorsogon, Philippines
- Party: Nationalist People's Coalition (2018–2020)
- Education: Santa Isabel College Manila (A.B. English)
- Occupation: Politician
- Profession: Travel agent, teacher

Maria Bernardita "Ditas" Bañares Ramos (February 17, 1944 – September 8, 2020) was a Filipina high school teacher, travel agent and legislator from Sorsogon, Philippines. She served in the House of Representatives of the Philippines, representing Sorsogon's 2nd congressional district in the 18th Congress from 2019 until her death in 2020. She was the youngest sister of three-term Sorsogon representative Deogracias B. Ramos Jr.

== Early life and education ==
Ramos was born on February 17, 1944, in the municipality of Gubat in Sorsogon, the youngest of six children born to Gubat native Deogracias Pura Ramos Sr. and Vicenta Bañares from Barcelona. Her father was a Philippine Army veteran who retired as a colonel and her maternal grandfather, Donato Bañares, worked as a judge in Barcelona. She attended primary school, initially at Gubat Elementary School and then at Lourdes College in Cagayan de Oro where the family moved when her father was stationed briefly in Mindanao. She finished her elementary education at Albert Elementary School in Sampaloc, Manila.

Ramos stayed in Manila where she completed both her secondary and college education at Santa Isabel College. She earned her Bachelor of Arts degree in English language in 1965. Ramos also took lessons in English drama, speech and diction at the Philippine Women's University and later enrolled in Japanese language classes.

== Career ==
Ramos returned to her hometown of Gubat, Sorsogon, in 1965 and started her career as a high school teacher of English literature at Saint Louise de Marillac College. In 1974, she joined the tourism industry and worked as an English speaking tour guide for the Department of Tourism during the administration of Secretary Jose Aspiras, which also required her to learn Japanese.

In 1976, Ramos embarked on a long professional career as a travel agent, starting with C.F. Sharp shipping company. A year later, she was hired as an inbound tour manager for the Philippine unit of Lufthansa and Hapag-Lloyd, a position she held for 29 years. She retired from those companies in 2006 at age 60.

== Politics ==
Ramos entered politics in the 2019 Philippine House of Representatives elections as a candidate of the Nationalist People's Coalition for Sorsogon-2nd district representative to replace her term-limited brother, Deogracias "Ding" Ramos Jr., who also previously served as Gubat mayor. She won the district race with 110,264 votes, beating former Sorsogon governor Robert Rodrigueza Lee of PDP–Laban, Randy Medina of Lakas and independent candidate Juan Escandor.

As a member of the 18th Congress, Ramos filed 29 legislative proposals relating to her work as a member of the majority bloc in the following House committees: Aquaculture and Fisheries Resources, Health, Human Rights, Public Works and Highways and Tourism. Among them was the consolidated House bill raising the age of sexual consent for statutory rape cases from 12 to 16 years old. She voted to pass the Anti-Terrorism Act of 2020 in Congress in June 2020. She also co-authored Republic Act 11478 that converted the Bicol Medical Center in Naga, Camarines Sur into a 1,000-bed capacity hospital.

== Personal life ==
Ramos was unmarried and had no children. She had five siblings: Deogracias Jr., a politician; Joe, a lawyer; Antonio; Carmen, a medical doctor; and Maria Paz, a chemical engineer and editor.

== Death ==
Ramos died on September 8, 2020, at the age of 76 from complications of COVID-19 during the COVID-19 pandemic in Sorsogon. She was earlier diagnosed with cancer but had tested positive for coronavirus just two days prior to her death. She was identified as COVID-19 Bicol patient #1467.

Ramos was the second member of the Philippine Congress to have died from the disease, after Senior Citizens Partylist representative Francisco Datol Jr. who died the previous month. Sorsogon Governor Francis Escudero declared three days of mourning until September 11 during which all Philippine flags in the province were flown at half-mast.

House of Representatives of the Philippines
Preceded by Deogracias Ramos Jr.	Member of the House of Representatives from Sorsogon's 2nd district 2019–2020	Succeeded by Manuel Fortes Jr.
