= Candidates in the 2013 Philippine House of Representatives election =

These are the candidates for the 2013 Philippine House of Representatives elections, by party. For party-list nominees, see Party-list nominees in the Philippine House of Representatives election, 2013. For candidates per district, refer to the elections by district articles.

== Akyson Demokratiko ==
Name	District	Incumbent?	Co-nominating party
Ruth Acosta	Bukidnon-3rd	No	
Onemig Bondoc	Bataan-2nd	No	
Alvin Calingin	Cagayan de Oro-1st	No	
Henry Capela	Ilocos Sur-2nd	No	
Batuali Gumacap	Lanao del Norte-2nd	No	
Ernesto Librando	Negros Occidental-1st	No	
Victor Murillo	Surigao del Sur-1st	No	
Gani Oro	Quezon City-5th	No	
Roberto Quicio, Jr.	Lanao del Norte-1st	No	
Ramon Reyes	Isabela-3rd	No	
Danilo Tan	Isabela-4th	No	
Pauline Anne Villaseñor	Quezon-1st	No	

== Ang Kapatiran ==
Name	District	Incumbent?	Co-nominating party
Carlos Cabochan	Caloocan-2nd	No	
Edilberto Magsaysay	Makati-1st	No	
Francisco Reyes	Mandaluyong	No	
Domingo Tambuatco	Muntunlupa	No	

== Kilusang Bagong Lipunan ==
Name	District	Incumbent?	Co-nominating party
Mario Cayabyab	Manila-5th	No	
Fernando Diaz	Manila-1st	No	
Basit Esmael	Maguindanao-2nd	No	
Imelda Marcos	Ilocos Norte-2nd	Yes	Nacionalista
Christopher Morales	Palawan-2nd	No	
Albert Rejante	San Jose del Monte	No	

== Laban ng Demokratikong Pilipino ==
Name	District	Incumbent?	Co-nominating party
Bellaflor Angara-Castillo	Aurora	No	
Constantino Jaraula	Cagayan de Oro-1st	No	
Celso Lobregat	Zamboanga City-1st	No	
Leandro Verceles	Catanduanes	No	

== Lakas-Christian Muslim Democrats ==
Name	District	Incumbent?	Co-nominating party
Miguelito Alano	Cavite-4th (Dasmariñas)	No	
Thelma Almario	Davao Oriental-2nd	Yes	
Rolando Andaya	Camarines Sur-1st	Yes	
Dato Arroyo	Camarines Sur-2nd	Yes	
Ritche Cuadra	Valenzuela-1st	No	
Eileen Ermita-Buhain	Batangas-1st	Yes	
Orlando Fua, Jr.	Siquijor	No	
Magtanggol Gunigundo	Valenzuela-2nd	Yes	
Elisa Olga Kho	Masbate-2nd	No	
Jose Carlos Lacson	Negros Occidental-3rd	No	
Joel Lamangan	Cavite-1st	No	
Gloria Macapagal Arroyo	Pampanga-2nd	Yes	KAMBILAN
Lani Mercado	Cavite-2nd (Bacoor)	Yes	
Victor Francisco Ortega	La Union-1st	Yes	
Elmer Panotes	Camarines Norte-2nd	Yes	
Imelda Papin	San Jose del Monte	No	
Philip Pichay	Surigao del Sur-1st	Yes	
Gaudencio Poblete	Cavite-5th	No	
Aileen Radaza	Lapu-Lapu City	No	
Ferdinand Martin Romualdez	Leyte-1st	Yes	
Pedro Romualdo	Camiguin	Yes	
Mernisa Salliman	Maguindanao-2nd	No	
Aleta Suarez	Quezon-3rd	No	
Keigoutina Suarez	Quezon-2nd	No	
Edgardo Urieta	Occidental Mindoro	No	
Albert Villasecca	Cavite-3rd	No	

== Liberal Party ==
Name	District	Incumbent?	Co-nominating party
Henedina Abad	Batanes	Yes	
Francis Gerald Abaya	Cavite-1st	No	
Rodrigo Abellanosa	Cebu City-2nd	No	
Romeo Acop	Antipolo-2nd	Yes	
Maria Lourdes Acosta	Bukidnon-1st	No	
Ansaruddin Adiong	Lanao del Sur-1st	No	
Alex Advincula	Cavite-3rd (Imus)	No	
Benjamin Agarao	Laguna-4th	No	
Wenifredo Agripo	Bukidnon-2nd	No	
Manuel Agyao	Kalinga	Yes	
Vicente Alcala	Quezon-2nd	No	
Madrid Elias Ali	Lanao del Norte-1st	No	
Jorge Almonte	Misamis Occidental-1st	Yes	
Mercedes Alvarez	Negros Occidental-6th	Yes	
Maria Evita Alvaro	Laguna-3rd	Yes	
Erlpe John Amante	Agusan del Norte-2nd	No	
Isagani Amatong	Zamboanga del Norte-3rd	No	
Rommel Amatong	Compostela Valley-2nd	Yes	
Marcelo Andaza	Negros Oriental-3rd	No	
Maria Andaya	Capiz-2nd	No	
Roberto Aquino	Agusan del Sur-1st	No	
Tomas Apacible	Batangas-1st	Yes	
Sergio Apostol	Leyte-2nd	Yes	
Maria Carmen Apsay	Compostela Valley-1st	Yes	
Maryam Arbison	Sulu-2nd	No	
Maria Rachel Arenas	Pangasinan-3rd	Yes	
Benjamin Asilo	Manila-1st	Yes	KKK
Eunice Babalcon	Samar-2nd	No	
Kaka Bag-ao	Dinagat Islands	Yes*	Akbayan
Teodoro Baguilat	Ifugao	Yes	
Pangalian Balindong	Lanao del Sur-2nd	Yes	
Vecente Edgar Balisado	Zamboanga del Norte-1st	No	
Jorge Banal, Jr.	Quezon City-3rd	Yes	
Franklin Bautista	Davao del Sur-2nd	Yes	
Trandy Baterina	Ilocos Sur-1st	No	
Feliciano Belmonte, Jr.	Quezon City-4th	Yes	
Kit Belmonte	Quezon City-6th	No	
Vicente Belmonte, Jr.	Iligan	Yes	
Alfredo Benitez	Negros Occidental-3rd	Yes	
Rodolfo Biazon	Muntinlupa	Yes	
Luis Bonguyan	Davao City-1st	No	
Ricardo Butalid, Jr.	Masbate-1st	No	
Roberto Cajes	Bohol-2nd	No	
Francisco Calalay	Quezon City-1st	No	
Leon Calipusan	Bohol-3rd	No	
Imelda Calixto-Rubiano	Pasay	Yes	
Wilfredo Caminero	Cebu-2nd	No	
Dencito Campaña	Cavite-6th	No	
Jose Carlos Cari	Leyte-5th	Yes	
Winston Castelo	Quezon City-2nd	Yes	
Jessie Castillo	Cavite-2nd (Bacoor)	No	
Nancy Catamco	Cotabato-2nd	Yes	
Arnel Cerafica	Pateros & Taguig-1st	Yes	KDT
Jun Chipeco, Jr.	Laguna-2nd	No	
Samuel Co	Zamboanga del Sur-1st	No	
Dakila Carlo Cua	Quirino	Yes	
Nelson Collantes	Batangas-3rd	Yes	
Ronald Cosalan	Benguet	Yes	
Vivian Dabu	Pampanga-2nd	No	
Maximo Dalog	Mountain Province	Yes	
Raul Daza	Northern Samar-1st	Yes	
Rico de Guzman	Navotas	No	NPC
Christopher De Leon	Batangas-2nd	No	
Shiela de Leon	Quezon-3rd	No	
Arthur Defensor, Jr.	Iloilo-3rd	Yes	
Raul del Mar	Cebu City-1st	No	
Antonio Del Rosario	Capiz-1st	Yes	
Antonio Rafael del Rosario	Davao del Norte-1st	Yes	
Mary Elizabeth Delgado	Surigao del Sur-1st	No	
Abba Dibangkitun	Lanao del Norte-2nd	No	
Joseph Ace Durano	Cebu-5th	No	
Enrico Echiverri	Caloocan-1st	No	
Edgar Erice	Caloocan-2nd	No	
Rogelio Espina	Biliran	Yes	
Ben Everdone	Eastern Samar	Yes	
Danilo Fernandez	Laguna-1st	Yes	
Jose Ray Fernes	Siquijor	No	
Lawrence Lemuel Fortun	Agusan del Norte-1st	No	
Salvio Fortuno	Camarines Sur-5th	Yes	
Florencio Garay	Surigao del Sur-2nd	Yes	
Mylene Garcia	Davao City-2nd	Yes	
Oscar Garin, Jr.	Iloilo-1st	Yes	
Marquez Go	Baguio	No	
Fernando Gonzalez	Albay-3rd	Yes	
Neptali Gonzales II	Mandaluyong	Yes	
Arcadio Gorriceta	Iloilo-2nd	No	
Raymond Guzman	Cagayan-3rd	No	
Hadji Hataman-Salliman	Basilan	Yes	
Dulce Ann Hofer	Zamboanga Sibugay-2nd	No	
Manuel Iway	Negros Oriental-1st	No	
Jesus M. Jardin	Misamis Oriental-2nd	No	
Paolo Everardo Javier	Antique	Yes	
Rosendo Labadlabad	Zamboanga del Norte-2nd	Yes	
Edcel Lagman, Jr.	Albay-1st	No	
Marisa Lerias	Southern Leyte	No	
Paulino Salvador Leachon	Oriental Mindoro-1st	No	
Kim Lokin	Pangasinan-2nd	No	
Carlo Lopez	Manila-2nd	Yes	KKK
Aurora Sonia Lorenzo	Nueva Ecija-4th	No	
Roy Loyola	Cavite-5th	Yes	
Sabas Mabulo	Camarines Sur-2nd	No	
Zajid Mangudadatu	Maguindanao-2nd	No	
Francisco Matugas	Surigao del Norte-1st	Yes	
Celestino Martinez III	Cebu-4th	No	
Jonjon Mendoza	Bulacan-3rd	Yes	
Pedrito Mendoza	Bulacan-2nd	No	
Alejandro Mirasol	Negros Occidental-5th	Yes	
Aga Muhlach	Camarines Sur-4th	No	
Joaquin Carlos Nava	Guimaras	Yes	
Rosenda Ocampo	Manila-6th	Yes	KKK
Loreto Leo Ocampos	Misamis Occidental-2nd	Yes	
Winifrido Oco	Camarines Norte-1st	No	
Eric Olivarez	Parañaque-1st	No	
Wilter Palma	Zamboanga Sibugay-1st	No	
Leonardo Pulido	Pangasinan-1st	No	
Miro Quimbo	Marikina-2nd	Yes	
Gabriel Luis Quisumbing	Cebu-6th	Yes	
Deogracias Ramos, Jr.	Sorsogon-2nd	Yes	
Rene Relampagos	Bohol-1st	Yes	
Regina Ongsiako Reyes	Marinduque	No	
Arthur Robes	San Jose del Monte	Yes	
Leni Robredo	Camarines Sur-3rd	No	
Angel Rodriguez	Lapu-Lapu City	No	
Oscar Rodriguez	Pampanga-3rd	No	
Herminia Roman	Bataan-1st	Yes	
Guillermo Romarate, Jr.	Surigao del Sur-2nd	Yes	
Roman Romulo	Pasig	Yes	
Jesus Sacdalan	Cotabato-1st	Yes	
Ruby Sahali	Tawi-Tawi	No	
Andres Salvacion	Leyte-3rd	Yes	
Alvin Sandoval	Palawan-1st	Yes	
Cesar Sarmiento	Catanduanes	Yes	
Mel Senen Sarmiento	Samar-1st	Yes	
Josephine Sato	Occidental Mindoro	No	
Mac John Seachon	Masbate-3rd	No	
Bai Sandra Sema	Maguindanao-1st	Yes	
Eric Singson	Ilocos Sur-2nd	Yes	
Shalani Soledad-Romulo	Valenzuela-2nd	No	NPC
Wigberto Tañada, Jr.	Quezon-4th	No	
Ignacio Taruc III	Cagayan-1st	No	
Marcelino Teodoro	Marikina-1st	Yes	
Abraham Tolentino	Cavite-7th	No	
Lucy Torres-Gomez	Leyte-4th	Yes	
Jerry Treñas	Iloilo City	Yes	
Niel Tupas, Jr.	Iloilo-5th	Yes	
Niel Tupas, Sr.	Iloilo-4th	No	
Czarina Umali	Nueva Ecija-3rd	Yes	
Reynaldo Umali	Oriental Mindoro-2nd	Yes	
Peter Unabia	Misamis Oriental-1st	Yes	
Isidro Ungab	Davao City-3rd	Yes	
Ramp Nielsen Uy	Northern Samar-2nd	No	
Rolando Uy	Cagayan de Oro-1st	No	
Carlos Valdez	Sultan Kudarat-1st	No	
Ma. Jocelyn Valera-Bernos	Abra	Yes	
Alfred Vargas	Quezon City-5th	No	
Karen Villanueva	Negros Oriental-2nd	No	
Linabelle Villarica	Bulacan-4th	Yes	
Liwayway Vinzons-Chato	Camarines Norte-2nd	No	
Joseph Victor Viologo	Nueva Ecija-2nd	Yes	
Geraldine Yapha	Cebu-3rd	No	

*as Akbayan party-list representative

== Nacionalista Party ==
Name	District	Incumbent?	Co-nominating party
Harlin Abayon	Northern Samar-1st	No	
Raneo Abu	Batangas-2nd	No	
Homobono Adaza	Camiguin	No	
Robert Ace Barbers	Surigao del Norte-2nd	No	
Jose Benjamin Benaldo	Cagayan de Oro-1st	Yes	
Al Francis Bichara	Albay-2nd	Yes	
Augusto H. Baculio	Misamis Oriental-2nd	No	
Juan Pablo Bondoc	Pampanga-4th	No	
Belma Cabilao	Zamboanga Sibugay	No	
Mercedes Cagas	Davao del Sur-1st	No	
Antonio Carolino	Laguna-4th	No	
Lino Cayetano	Taguig-2nd	No	
Eric Codilla	Leyte-4th	No	
Nelson Dayanghirang Sr.	Davao Oriental-1st	Yes	
Nestor de los Reyes	Camarines Sur-1st	No	
Baby Gloria de Mesa	Pateros & Taguig-1st	No	
Paul Giovanni Diu	Biliran	No	
Gwendolyn Ecleo	Dinagat Islands	No	
Rodolfo Fariñas	Ilocos Norte-1st	Yes	
Florencio Flores	Bukidnon-2nd	Yes	
Gerard Anthony Gullas, Jr.	Cebu-1st	No	
Victoria Hernandez-Reyes	Batangas-3rd	No	
Seth Jalosjos	Zamboanga del Norte-1st	Yes	
Annaliza Kwan	Eastern Samar	No	
Henry Oaminal	Misamis Occidental-2nd	No	
Mario Lim	Pangasinan-4th	No	
Eleandro Jesus Madrona	Romblon	Yes	
Ramon Mitra III	Palawan-2nd	No	
Rodrigo Montero	Aurora	No	
Carlos M. Padilla	Nueva Vizcaya	Yes	
Randolph Parcasio	Davao del Sur-2nd	No	
Johanna J. Parreño	Zamboanga del Norte-3rd	No	
Federico Poblete	Cavite-1st	No	
Gilbert Remulla	Cavite-7th	No	
Ronald Singson	Ilocos Sur-1st	No	Biled
Rolando Somera	Abra	No	
Arnold Tan	Samar-1st	No	
Luis Raymond Villafuerte	Camarines Sur-2nd	No	
Mark Villar	Las Piñas	Yes	
Emilio Yulo III	Negros Occidental-5th	No	
Eduardo Zialcita	Parañaque-1st	No	

== National Unity Party ==
Name	District	Incumbent?	Co-nominating party
Franz Joseph Alvarez	Palawan-1st	No	
Magnolia Antonino	Nueva Ecija-4th	No	
Philip Arles	Negros Occidental-6th	No	
Jose Noel Arquiz	Iligan	No	
Jesus Maria Jose Avelino	Capiz-1st	No	
Elpidio Barzaga	Cavite-4th (Dasmariñas)	No	Liberal
Trisha Bonoan-David	Manila-4th	Yes	Liberal, KKK, UNA
Maria Vida Bravo	Masbate-1st	No	
Mitzi Cajayon	Caloocan-2nd	Yes	UNA
Jane Castro	Capiz-2nd	Yes	
Leo Rafael Cueva	Negros Occidental-2nd	No	
Thomas Dumpit	La Union-2nd	No	
Luis Ferrer IV	Bataan-6th	No	
Enrique Garcia	Bataan-2nd	No	
Arnulfo Go	Sultan Kudarat-2nd	Yes	
Romeo Jalosjos	Zamboanga Sibugay-2nd	No	
Antonio Lagdameo	Davao del Norte-2nd	Yes	
Tupay Loong	Sulu-1st	Yes	
Evelyn Mellana	Agusan del Sur-2nd	Yes	
Damian Mercado	Southern Leyte	No	
Karlo Alexei Nograles	Davao City-1st	Yes	
Emil Ong	Northern Samar-2nd	No	
Crescencio Pacalso	Benguet	No	
Gavini Pancho	Bulacan-2nd	No	
Maria Valentina Plaza	Agusan del Sur-1st	Yes	
Roberto Puno	Antipolo-1st	Yes	
Catherine Reyes	Camarines Norte-1st	No	
Benhur Salimbangon	Cebu-4th	Yes	
Ma. Victoria Sy-Alvarado	Bulacan-1st	Yes	
Randolph Ting	Cagayan-3rd	Yes	
Ruella Tiongson	La Union-1st	No	
Baby Aline Vargas-Alfonso	Cagayan-2nd	Yes	
Lord Allan Jay Velasco	Marinduque	Yes	
Rolando Yebes	Zamboanga del Norte-2nd	No	
Victor Yu	Zamboanga del Sur-1st	Yes	

== Nationalist People's Coalition ==
Name	District	Incumbent?	Co-nominating party
Anuar Abubakar	Tawi-Tawi	No	
Pedro Acharon	South Cotabato-1st	Yes	
Giorgidi Aggabao	Isabela-4th	Yes	
Rodolfo Albano	Isabela-1st	Yes	
Felix Alferor	Camarines Sur-5th	No	
Zenaida Angping	Manila-3rd	Yes	Liberal, UNA
George Arnaiz	Negros Oriental-2nd	Yes	
Luis Asistio	Caloocan-2nd	No	
Aris Aumentado	Bohol-2nd	No	
Angelito Banayo	Agusan del Norte-1st	No	
Leopoldo Bataoil	Pangasinan-2nd	Yes	
Eleanor Begtang	Apayao	Yes	
Jesus Celeste	Pangasinan-1st	Yes	
Aurora Cerilles	Zamboanga del Sur-2nd	Yes	
Carmen Cojuangco	Pangasinan-5th	Yes	
Gina de Venecia	Pangasinan-4th	Yes	
Abdullah Dimaporo	Lanao del Norte-2nd	No	
Imelda Dimaporo	Lanao del Norte-1st	Yes	
Joel Roy Duavit	Rizal-1st	Yes	
Henry Dueñas	Taguig-2nd	No	
Napoleon Dy	Isabela-2nd	Yes	
Evelina Escudero	Sorsogon-1st	No	
Emerson Espeleta	Muntinlupa	No	
Wilfredo Mark Enverga	Quezon-1st	Yes	
Eufranio Eriguel	La Union-2nd	Yes	
Jeffrey Ferrer	Negros Occidental-4th	Yes	
Felix William Fuentebella	Camarines Sur-4th	No	
Ferdinand Hernandez	South Cotabato-2nd	No	
Otilia Galilea	Negros Occidental-2nd	No	
Sherwin Gatchalian	Valenzuela-1st	Yes	
Aurelio Gonzales, Jr.	Pampanga-3rd	Yes	
Douglas Hagedorn	Palawan-3rd	No	
Alvarez Isnaji	Sulu-1st	No	
Mariano Cristino Joson	Nueva Ecija-1st	No	
Josephine Lacson-Noel	Malabon	Yes	
Scott Davies Lanete	Masbate-3rd	Yes	
Arsenio Latasa	Davao del Sur-1st	No	
Jules Ledesma	Negros Occidental-1st	Yes	
Evelio Leonardia	Bacolod	No	
Dan Neri Lim	Bohol-1st	No	
Faith Maganto	Manila-5th	No	
Mark L. Mendoza	Batangas-4th	Yes	
Francis Nepomuceno	Pampanga-1st	No	
Mohammed Hussein Pacasum Pangandaman	Lanao del Sur-1st	Yes	
Jerome Paras	Negros Oriental-1st	No	
Jesus Emmanuel Paras	Bukidnon-1st	Yes	
Felicito Payumo	Bataan-1st	No	
Rico Peligro	Davao del Norte-2nd	No	
Socrates Piñol	Cotabato-3rd	No	
Rodolfo Plaza	Agusan del Sur-2nd	No	
Salvacion Ponce Enrile	Cagayan-1st	No	
Marilyn Primcias-Agabas	Pangasinan-6th	Yes	
Santiago Quial	Pasay	No	
Isidro Rodriguez	Rizal-2nd	Yes	
Leonardo Roman	Bataan-2nd	No	
Nur Ana Sahidulla	Sulu-2nd	Yes	
Angelina Tan	Quezon-4th	No	
Milagrosa Tan	Samar-2nd	Yes	
Pryde Henry Teves	Negros Oriental-3rd	Yes	
Darius Tuason	Masbate-2nd	No	
Nelly Villafuerte	Camarines Sur-3rd	No	
Julita Villareal	Nueva Ecija-4th	No	
Arthur Yap	Bohol-3rd	Yes	

== Partido Demokratiko Pilipino-Lakas ng Bayan ==
Name	District	Incumbent?	Co-nominating party
Gat-Ala Alatiit, Jr.	Laguna-1st	No	
Oscar Arcilla	Camarines Sur-3rd	No	
Gregorio Luis Contacto	Albay-1st	No	
Antonio Deborja	Bulacan-2nd	No	
Faysah Dumarpa	Lanao del Sur-1st	No	
Alberto Hidalgo	Leyte-2nd	No	
Teresita Lazaro	Laguna-2nd	No	
Celia Lopez	Laguna-3rd	No	
Benasing Macarambon	Lanao del Sur-2nd	No	
Yusoph Mando	Basilan	No	
Guiamalodin Mohamad	Maguindanao-1st	No	
Benedicto Palacol, Jr.	Laguna-4th	No	
Lorenzo Sumulong III	Antipolo-2nd	No	

== Partido ng Magsasaka at Manggagawa ==
Name	District	Incumbent?	Co-nominating party
Samuel Enesando	Zamboanga City-2nd	No	
Alvin John Tañada	Quezon-4th	No	
Antero Florante Villaflor	Antique	No	
Rommel S. Zagada	Misamis Oriental-1st	No	

== Pwersa ng Masang Pilipino ==
Name	District	Incumbent?	Co-nominating party
Chrisler Cabarrubias	Zamboanga City-1st	No	
Glenn Chong	Biliran	No	
Restituto de Quiros	Catanduanes	No	
Nehemias Dela Cruz, Sr.	Negros Occidental-1st	No	
Sappho Gillego	Sorsogon-2nd	No	
Nicomedes Hernandez	Batangas-3rd	No	
Anthony Miranda	Isabela-4th	No	
Hans Palacios	Quezon City-4th	No	
Rodrigo Perez	Nueva Vizcaya	No	
Ali Sangki	Maguindanao-2nd	No	
Ricardo Silverio, Jr.	Bulacan-3rd	No	
Reynaldo Tecechian	Zamboanga Sibugay-1st	No	

== United Nationalist Alliance ==
Name	District	Incumbent?	Co-nominating party
Ptr. Bienvenido M. Abante	Manila-6th	No	
Mario Alvizo	Surigao del Sur-2nd	No	
Sol Aragones-Sampleo	Laguna-3rd	No	
J.V. Bautista	Nueva Ecija-3rd	No	
Natalio Beltran	Romblon	No	
Godofredo Bernabe	Batangas-2nd	No	
Abigail Binay	Makati-2nd	Yes	
Hernan Biron, Jr.	Iloilo-4th	No	
Jose Cabochan	Bulacan-3rd	No	
Rez Cortez	Camarines Sur-5th	No	
Rita Crisologo	Quezon City-1st	No	
Luisa Cuaresma	Nueva Vizcaya	No	
Manuel Jose Dalipe	Zamboanga City-2nd	No	
Guillermo de Castro	Sorsogon-2nd	No	
Matias Defensor, Jr.	Quezon City-3rd	No	
Crisanteo dela Cruz	Zamboanga City-1st	No	
Ernesto Dionisio	Manila-1st	No	Asenso Manileño
Jupiter Dominguez	Mountain Province	No	
Macario Duguiang	Kalinga	No	
Julieta Flores	Iloilo-1st	No	
Elmo Tolosa	South Cotabato-2nd	No	
Raul Gonzales, Jr.	Iloilo City	No	
Monique Lagdameo	Makati-1st	Yes	
Reynato Latorre	Samar-2nd	No	
Francis Lavilla	Iloilo-3rd	No	
Dante Liban	Quezon City-5th	No	
Arlali Libarios	Agusan del Norte-1st	No	
Dale Gonzalo Malapitan	Caloocan-1st	No	
Antonio Maming, Sr.	Aklan	No	
Anacleto Mendoza	Batanes	No	
Ian Mark Nakaya	Cagayan de Oro-2nd	No	
Rogelio Pacquiao	South Cotabato-1st	No	
Annabella Rama-Gutierrez	Cebu City-1st	No	
Bernard Jonathan Ramandaban	Leyte-3rd	No	
Renato Roble	Leyte-5th	No	
Roberto Rodriguez	Palawan-2nd	No	
Jett Roxas	Iloilo-5th	No	
Raymundo Roquero	Antique	No	
Fernando Sacdalan	Cotabato-1st	No	
Ambaro Sagle	Apayao	No	
Orlando Salatandre, Jr.	Pasig	No	
Augusto Syjuco, Jr.	Iloilo-2nd	Yes	
Barbara Ruby Talaga	Quezon-2nd	No	
Gustavo Tambunting	Parañaque-2nd	No	
Edward Tan	Manila-2nd	No	Asenso Manileño
Toby Tiangco	Navotas	Yes	Partido Navoteño
John Nico Valencia	Oriental Mindoro-1st	No	
Bernardo Vergara	Baguio	Yes	
Ricky Ziga	Albay-1st	No	

== Other and local parties ==
Included here are parties that put up candidates in less than four districts, and local parties. This does not include local parties that had co-nominated a candidate from a national, or another, party already listed above.

Name	Party	District	Incumbent?	Co-nominating party
Frederick Abueg	PPP	Palawan-2nd	No	
Salih Abdul Benito	Ompia	Lanao del Sur-2nd	No	
Uriel Borja	Partido Lakas ng Masa	Iligan	No	
Reyal Calderon	MKM	Bataan-2nd	No	
Edgardo Enerlan	Tinog Leytenon	No		
Teodulfo Espejon	Makabayan	Surigao del Norte-1st	No	
Gwendolyn Garcia	One Cebu	Cebu-3rd	No	UNA
Pablo P. Garcia	One Cebu	Cebu-2nd	Yes	NUP
Yeng Guiao	Kambilan	Pampanga-1st	No	Lakas
Roberto Guanzon	Katipunan ng Bagong Caloocan	Caloocan-1st	No	
Sarah Karim	DPP	Zamboanga Sibugay-1st	No	
Danny Lacuna	Asenso Manileño	Manila-6th	No	
Jose Lobregat	AZAP	Zamboanga City-2nd	No	
Hans Roger Luna	CNUPP	Abra	No	
Eduardo Matillano	Sulong Palawan	Palawan-3rd	No	
Ramon Morales	Kapayapaan, Kaunlaran at Katarungan	Manila-3rd	No	
Orlando Nagaño	PRP	Nueva Ecija-4th	No	
Manny Pacquiao	People's Champ Movement	Sarangani	Yes	UNA
Jerry Pelayo	Kambilan	Pampanga-4th	No	Lakas
Alfie Pepito	One Cebu	Cebu-5th	No	
Rico Rentuza	Akbayan	Southern Leyte	No	
Rufus Rodriguez	CDP	Cagayan de Oro-2nd	Yes	
Nerissa Corazon Soon-Ruiz	One Cebu	Cebu-6th	No	
Estrelita Suansing	Unang Sigaw	Nueva Ecija-1st	No	
Mary Ann Susano	Kapayapaan, Kaunlaran at Katarungan	Quezon City-5th	No	
Ronaldo Zamora	Partido Magdiwang	San Juan	No	UNA
Jose Zubiri III	Bukidnon Paglaum	Bukidnon-3rd	Yes	Liberal

== Independents ==
=== Region I ===
- Ilocos Norte-2nd
  - Ferdinand Ignacio
  - Lorenzo Madamba
- Pangasinan-5th
  - Demetria Demetrio

=== Region II ===
- Batanes
  - Carlo Oliver Diasnes
- Isabela-1st
  - Stephen Soliven
- Nueva Vizcaya
  - Lawrence Sta. Ana

=== Region III ===
- Aurora
  - Teofilo Manalo
- Bulacan-1st
  - Sahiron Salim
- Bulacan-2nd
  - Joseph Cristobal
  - Enrique Villafuerte
- Bulacan-3rd
  - Enrique Viudez
- Bulacan-4th
  - Jovel Lopez
- San Jose del Monte
  - Garret Ian Miso
  - Rogelio Montinola
  - Albert Rejante
  - Oscar Robes
- Nueva Ecija-1st
  - Renato Diaz
- Nueva Ecija-3rd
  - Jayorlando Valinio
- Pampanga-2nd
  - Charlie Chua
  - Josefina Leoncio
- Pampanga-4th
  - Ramon Sediego
- Tarlac-2nd
  - Ernesto Calma

=== CAR ===
- Baguio
  - Nicasio Aliping
  - Miguel Arvisu
  - Roly Manuel
  - Richard Zarate
- Benguet
  - Munar Renan
- Ifugao
  - Solomon Chungalao

=== Region IV-A ===
- Antipolo-1st
  - Salvador Abaño
  - Dioscoro Esteban
  - Florante Quizon
  - Francisco Sumulong, Jr.
- Antipolo-2nd
  - Silverio Bulanon
- Batangas-1st
  - Reynaldo Albajera
  - Luisito Ruiz
- Batangas-3rd
  - Sonia Aquino
- Batangas-4th
  - Bernadette Sabili
- Cavite-2nd (Bacoor)
  - Gerbie Ber Ado
  - Leonardo Castillo
- Cavite-3rd (Imus)
  - Eleazar Salon
- Cavite-7th
  - Pedro Lopez
  - Norman Versoza
- Quezon-2nd
  - Lynette Punzalan
  - Marivic Rivera
- Quezon-3rd
  - Eduardo Rodriguez

=== Region IV-B ===
- Palawan-1st
  - Randy Rodriguez
  - Fernando Saw
- Palawan-2nd
  - Christopher Morales
- Palawan-3rd
  - Arcelie Altamera
  - Jimmy Carbonell
  - Raymundo Lagasca
  - Santiago Lazo
  - Gem Matilliano

=== Region V ===
- Albay-2nd
  - Walter Magdato
- Albay-3rd
  - Dante Arandia
- Camarines Norte-2nd
  - Ruth Herrera
- Camarines Sur-3rd
  - Charina Fausto
- Masbate-3rd
  - Ricardo Yanson
- Sorsogon-1st
  - Aeneas Eli Diaz
  - Arnulfo Perete
- Sorsogon-2nd
  - Jose Solis

=== NCR ===
- Caloocan-1st
  - Roberto Guanzon
  - Maria Hernando
  - Milagros Libuton
  - Sandro Limpin
  - Imelda Pengson
  - Sirgea Villamayor
- Caloocan-2nd
  - Adoracion Garcia
- Las Piñas
  - Filipino Alvarado
  - Luis Casimiro
- Makati-1st
  - Virgilio Batalia
  - Miguel Lopez, Jr.
- Makati-2nd
  - Joel Sarza
- Mandaluyong
  - Gerald Castillo
  - Renato Panem
- Manila-1st
  - Ricardo Bacolod
  - Fernando Diaz
- Manila-3rd
  - Alex Garcia
- Manila-3rd
  - Mario Cayabyab
- Manila-6th
  - Richard Bautista
  - Francisco Candaza
- Marikina-2nd
  - Albert Bocobo
- Muntinlupa-2nd
  - Rafael Burgos
  - Santiago Carlos, Jr.
- Parañaque-1st
  - Florante Romey, Jr.
- Parañaque-2nd
  - Joey Marquez
  - Pacifico Rosal
- Pasay
  - Pastor de Castro, Jr.
- Quezon City-1st
  - Gary Jamile
- Quezon City-2nd
  - Ismael Mathay III
- Valenzuela-2nd
  - Pablo Hernandez

=== Region VI ===
- Aklan
  - Phoebe Clarice Cabagnot
  - Teodorico Haresco
  - Ramy Panagsagan
- Bacolod
  - Lyndon Caña
  - Anthony Golez Jr. (incumbent)
  - Ely Sergio Palma
- Capiz-1st
  - Zinon Amoroso
  - Diosdado Tinsay
- Guimaras
  - Tomas Junco, Jr.
  - Edwin Lim
- Iloilo-2nd
  - Salvador Calabuna III
- Negros Occidental-1st
  - Leopoldo Sua
- Negros Occidental-4th
  - Ike Barredo
  - Leonardo Erobas

=== Region VII ===
- Cebu-2nd
  - Simeon Kintanar
- Cebu-5th
  - Gilbert Wagas
- Cebu City-1st
  - Pablo Doroño, Jr.
  - Marlo Maamo
  - Vicente Mañalac
  - Donato Sotero Navarro
  - Florencio Villari
- Cebu City-2nd
  - Aristotle Batuhan
  - Erlinda Sollano
- Lapu-Lapu City
  - Remegio Oyao
- Negros Oriental-1st
  - Lowell Andaya
  - Danilo Roble
- Negros Oriental-2nd
  - Raul Aniñon

=== Region VIII ===
- Biliran
  - Paul Giovanni Diu
- Eastern Samar
  - Febidal Fadel
- Leyte-5th
  - Crispulo Truya
- Samar-1st
  - Antolin Tan
- Southern Leyte
  - Vicente Geraldo

=== Region IX ===
- Zamboanga City-1st
  - Caesar Climaco
  - Abdurahman Tagayan
- Zamboanga City-2nd
  - Abelardo Climaco
  - Lilia Nuño
- Zamboanga del Sur-2nd
  - Rogelio Carbiera

=== Region X ===
- Bukidnon-1st
  - Candido Pancrudo
- Bukidnon-4th
  - Glenn Peduche
- Cagayan de Oro-1st
  - Ricardo Nagac
- Cagayan de Oro-2nd
  - Leodegario Lagrimas
  - Eric Saarenas
- Iligan
  - Jose Booc
  - Samson Dajao
  - Alberto Ora
- Lanao del Norte-1st
  - Roberto Quico, Jr.
- Misamis Occidental-1st
  - Franklin Omandam
- Misamis Oriental-1st
  - Henry Clyde C. Abott
- Misamis Oriental-2nd
  - Antonio P. Calingin
  - Juliet Uy

=== Region XI ===
- Davao City-1st
  - Elly Pamatong
- Davao City-2nd
  - Joji Bian
  - Ulysses Lopez
  - Jenell Nagayo
- Davao del Norte-1st
  - Gelacio Gementiza
  - Emmanuel Mahipus
- Davao del Sur-1st
  - Wilhelmina Almendras
  - Pablo Villaber
- Davao Oriental-1st
  - Napoleon Sango

=== Region XII ===
- Cotabato-1st
  - Anthony Dequina
- Cotabato-2nd
  - Gregorio Andolana
  - Bernardo Piñol
- Cotabato-3rd
  - Amin Sindao
  - Jose Tejada
- South Cotabato-1st
  - Efren Biclar
- South Cotabato-2nd
  - Efren Biclar
  - Netz Varona
- Sultan Kudarat-1st
  - Raden Sakaluran (incumbent)
- Sultan Kudarat-2nd
  - Rogerto Examen

=== ARMM ===
- Lanao del Sur-1st
  - Hussein Pangandaman (incumbent)
  - Monaoray Saripada
- Lanao del Sur-2nd
  - Bolkisah Bantuas
- Maguindanao-1st
  - Sindatu Dilanganen
- Maguindanao-2nd
  - Habbas Camendan
  - Basit Esmael
  - Jaafar Apollo Matalam
  - Pendatun Pangadil
  - Solaiman Sandigan
- Sulu-1st
  - Tarhata Misuari
- Tawi-Tawi
  - Ibrahim Albani

=== Caraga ===
- Surigao del Norte-1st
  - Gertrudes Saberon
- Surigao del Norte-2nd
  - Pepito Lago
- Surigao del Sur-1st
  - Victor Murillo
