= 18th Congress of the Philippines =

39th legislative term of the Philippines

←	17th	19th	→
- GSIS Building (2010) (top) and Batasang Pambansa Complex (2010) (bottom)

Overview
- Term: July 22, 2019 – June 1, 2022
- President: Rodrigo Duterte
- Vice President: Leni Robredo

Senate
- Members: 24
- President: Tito Sotto
- President pro tempore: Ralph Recto
- Majority leader: Juan Miguel Zubiri
- Minority leader: Franklin Drilon

House of Representatives
- Members: 304
- Speaker: Alan Peter Cayetano (until October 13, 2020); Lord Allan Velasco (from October 13, 2020)
- Deputy Speakers: Paolo Duterte (until October 13, 2020); Dinand Hernandez; Evelina Escudero; Loren Legarda; Conrado Estrella III; Prospero Pichay Jr.; Roberto Puno; Eddie Villanueva; Aurelio Gonzales Jr. (until December 7, 2020); Johnny Pimentel (until December 7, 2020); Luis Raymund Villafuerte (until October 14, 2020); Raneo Abu (until November 18, 2020); Neptali Gonzales II; Danilo Fernandez (until November 18, 2020); Rose Marie Arenas (from July 29, 2019); Rodante Marcoleta (from July 29, 2019); Henry Oaminal (from July 29, 2019); Pablo John Garcia (from July 29, 2019); Vilma Santos (from August 13, 2019); Deogracias Victor Savellano (from August 13, 2019); Mujiv Hataman (from August 13, 2019); Mikee Romero (August 13, 2019 – October 2, 2020 and from October 14, 2020); Fredenil Castro (October 2 – November 18, 2020); Lito Atienza (from November 18, 2020); Rufus Rodriguez (from November 18, 2020); Arnolfo Teves Jr. (from December 7, 2020); Benny Abante (from December 7, 2020); Wes Gatchalian (from December 7, 2020); Eric Martinez (from December 7, 2020); Juan Pablo Bondoc (from December 7, 2020); Bernadette Herrera (from December 7, 2020); Divina Grace Yu (from December 7, 2020); Rogelio Pacquiao (from December 7, 2020); Kristine Singson-Meehan (from December 7, 2020); Strike Revilla (from December 14, 2020); Isidro Ungab (from December 16, 2020); Abraham Tolentino (from December 16, 2020); Camille Villar (from February 2, 2021); Len Alonte (from March 25, 2021)
- Majority leader: Martin Romualdez
- Minority leader: Benny Abante (until October 16, 2020); Joseph Stephen Paduano (from October 19, 2020)

The 18th Congress of the Philippines (Filipino: Ikalabingwalong Kongreso ng Pilipinas), composed of the Philippine Senate and House of Representatives, met from July 22, 2019, until June 1, 2022, during the last three years of Rodrigo Duterte's presidency. The convening of the 18th Congress followed the 2019 general elections, which replaced half of the Senate membership and the entire membership of the House of Representatives.

== Leadership ==
=== Senate ===
Senate President

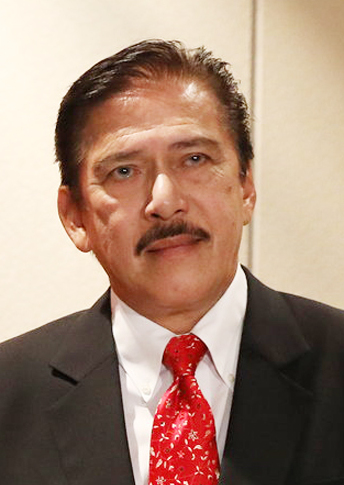
Tito Sotto

- President: Tito Sotto (NPC)
- President pro tempore: Ralph Recto (Nacionalista)
- Majority Floor Leader: Juan Miguel Zubiri (Independent)
- Minority Floor Leader: Franklin Drilon (Liberal)

=== House of Representatives ===
House Speaker

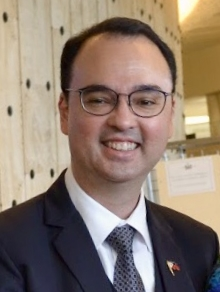
Alan Peter Cayetano,
until October 12, 2020

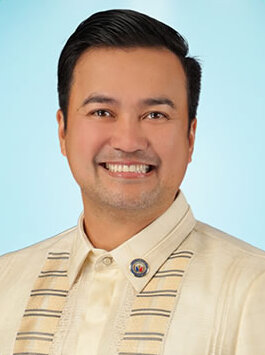
Lord Allan Velasco,
from October 12, 2020

- Speaker:
  - Alan Peter Cayetano (Taguig–Pateros–1st, Nacionalista), until October 13, 2020
  - Lord Allan Velasco (Marinduque–Lone, PDP–Laban), from October 13, 2020
- Senior Deputy Speaker:
  - Paulino Salvador Leachon (Oriental Mindoro–1st, PDP–Laban), from October 14, 2020
- Deputy Speakers:
  - Paolo Duterte (Davao City–1st, HNP), until October 13, 2020
  - Dinand Hernandez (South Cotabato–2nd, PDP–Laban)
  - Evelina Escudero (Sorsogon–1st, NPC)
  - Loren Legarda (Antique–Lone, NPC)
  - Conrado Estrella III (Party-list, Abono)
  - Prospero Pichay Jr. (Surigao del Sur–1st, Lakas)
  - Roberto Puno (Antipolo–1st, NUP)
  - Eddie Villanueva (Party-list, CIBAC)
  - Aurelio Gonzales Jr. (Pampanga–3rd, PDP–Laban), until December 7, 2020
  - Johnny Pimentel (Surigao del Sur–2nd, PDP–Laban), until December 7, 2020
  - Luis Raymund Villafuerte (Camarines Sur–2nd, Nacionalista), until October 14, 2020
  - Raneo Abu (Batangas–2nd, Nacionalista), until November 18, 2020
  - Neptali Gonzales II (Mandaluyong–Lone, PDP–Laban)
  - Danilo Fernandez (Laguna–1st, PDP–Laban), until November 18, 2020
  - Rose Marie Arenas (Pangasinan–3rd, PDP–Laban), from July 29, 2019
  - Rodante Marcoleta (Party-list, SAGIP), from July 29, 2019
  - Henry Oaminal (Misamis Occidental–2nd, Nacionalista), from July 29, 2019
  - Pablo John Garcia (Cebu–3rd, NUP), from July 29, 2019
  - Vilma Santos (Batangas–6th, Nacionalista), from August 13, 2019
  - Deogracias Victor Savellano (Ilocos Sur–1st, Nacionalista), from August 13, 2019
  - Mujiv Hataman (Basilan–Lone, Liberal), from August 13, 2019
  - Mikee Romero (Party-list, 1-Pacman), August 13, 2019 – October 2, 2020 and from October 14, 2020
  - Fredenil Castro (Capiz–2nd, Lakas), October 2 – November 18, 2020
  - Lito Atienza (Party-list, Buhay), from November 18, 2020
  - Rufus Rodriguez (Cagayan de Oro–2nd, CDP), from November 18, 2020
  - Arnolfo Teves Jr. (Negros Oriental–3rd, PDP–Laban), from December 7, 2020
  - Benny Abante (Manila–6th, NUP), from December 7, 2020
  - Wes Gatchalian (Valenzuela–1st, NPC), from December 7, 2020
  - Eric Martinez (Valenzuela–2nd, PDP–Laban), from December 7, 2020
  - Juan Pablo Bondoc (Pampanga–4th, PDP–Laban), from December 7, 2020
  - Bernadette Herrera (Party-list, Bagong Henerasyon), from December 7, 2020
  - Divina Grace Yu (Zamboanga del Sur–1st, PDP–Laban), from December 7, 2020
  - Rogelio Pacquiao (Sarangani–Lone, PDP–Laban), from December 7, 2020
  - Kristine Singson-Meehan (Ilocos Sur–2nd, Bileg), from December 7, 2020
  - Strike Revilla (Cavite–2nd, NUP), from December 14, 2020
  - Isidro Ungab (Davao City–3rd, HNP), from December 16, 2020
  - Abraham Tolentino (Cavite–8th, NUP), from December 16, 2020
  - Camille Villar (Las Piñas–Lone, Nacionalista), from February 2, 2021
  - Len Alonte (Biñan–Lone, PDP–Laban), from March 25, 2021
- Majority Floor Leader: Martin Romualdez (Leyte–1st, Lakas)
- Minority Floor Leader:
  - Benny Abante (Manila–6th, NUP), until October 16, 2020
  - Joseph Stephen Paduano (Party-list, Abang Lingkod), from October 19, 2020

== Sessions ==
- First Regular Session: July 22, 2019 – June 5, 2020
  - July 22 – October 4, 2019
  - October 5 – November 3, 2019
  - November 4 – December 20, 2019
  - January 20 – March 13, 2020
  - March 14 – May 3, 2020
  - First Special Session: March 23, 2020
  - May 4 – June 5, 2020
- Second Regular Session: July 27, 2020 – June 4, 2021
  - July 27 – October 12, 2020
  - Second Special Session: October 13–16, 2020
  - November 16 – December 18, 2020
  - January 18 – March 26, 2021
  - May 17 – June 4, 2021
- Third Regular Session: July 26, 2021 – June 3, 2022
  - July 26 – September 30, 2021
  - November 8 – December 17, 2021
  - January 17 – February 4, 2022
  - May 23 – June 1, 2022

== Meeting places ==
- Senate: GSIS Building, Pasay
- House of Representatives: Batasang Pambansa Complex, Quezon City
  - Batangas City Convention Center, Batangas City (January 22, 2020)
  - Celebrity Sports Plaza, Quezon City (October 12, 2020)

== Composition ==
Both chambers of Congress are divided into parties and blocs. While members are elected via parties, blocs are the basis for committee memberships. Only members of the majority and minority blocs are accorded committee memberships. This is how blocs are determined:

- Majority bloc: All members who voted for the Senate President or Speaker during the Senate presidential or speakership election.
- Minority bloc: All members who voted for the second-placed candidate during the Senate presidential or speakership election.
- Independent minority bloc: All members who did not vote for the winning or second-best nominee during the Senate presidential or speakership election.
- Independent bloc: All members who abstained from voting during the Senate presidential or speakership election.
- Not a member of any bloc: All members who have not voted during the Senate presidential or speakership election.

=== Senate ===
Party	Maj	Min	Total	%
Nacionalista	4	0	4	16.67%
Liberal	0	3	3	12.50%
NPC	3	0	3	12.50%
PDP–Laban	3	0	3	12.50%
Akbayan	0	1	1	4.17%
Bagumbayan	1	0	1	4.17%
Lakas	1	0	1	4.17%
LDP	1	0	1	4.17%
PDDS	1	0	1	4.17%
PROMDI	1	0	1	4.17%
UNA	1	0	1	4.17%
Independent	4	0	4	16.67%
Total	20	4	24	100%

=== House of Representatives ===
Party	2019 results	Current seats					
Party	2019 results	Maj	Min	Ind min	Una	Total	%
PCFI (Note: Party-list representative)	54	45	8	1	0	54	17.76%
PDP–Laban	82	51	0	1	0	52	17.11%
Nacionalista	42	41	2	0	0	43	14.14%
NPC	37	36	2	0	0	38	12.50%
NUP	25	31	2	0	0	33	10.86%
Lakas	12	24	0	0	0	24	7.89%
Liberal	18	8	4	0	0	12	3.95%
Makabayan	6	0	6	0	0	6	1.97%
Hugpong	3	4	0	1	0	5	1.64%
BPP	2	2	0	0	0	2	0.66%
LDP	2	1	0	1	0	2	0.66%
NUP/1-Cebu	0	2	0	0	0	2	0.66%
NUP/Asenso Manileño	0	1	1	0	0	2	0.66%
NUP/UNEGA	0	2	0	0	0	2	0.66%
UBJP	0	2	0	0	0	2	0.66%
Aksyon	1	1	0	0	0	1	0.33%
Aksyon/Asenso Manileño	0	1	0	0	0	1	0.33%
Basilan Unity Party	0	1	0	0	0	1	0.33%
CDP	1	1	0	0	0	1	0.33%
Kambilan	0	1	0	0	0	1	0.33%
Lakas/UNEGA	0	1	0	0	0	1	0.33%
Magdalo	1	1	0	0	0	1	0.33%
Mindoro bago Sarili	0	1	0	0	0	1	0.33%
NPC/Partido Siquijodnon	0	1	0	0	0	1	0.33%
Navoteño	1	1	0	0	0	1	0.33%
One Muntinlupa	0	0	0	1	0	1	0.33%
PCM	0	1	0	1	0	1	0.33%
PDDS	0	0	0	1	0	1	0.33%
PPPL	2	1	0	0	0	1	0.33%
PRP	1	1	0	0	0	1	0.33%
Reporma	0	0	0	1	0	1	0.33%
Unang Sigaw	0	1	0	0	0	1	0.33%
Independent	2	2	0	0	0	2	0.66%
Asenso Abrenio	1	0	0	0	0	0	0.00%
HTL	1	0	0	0	0	0	0.00%
KABAKA	1	0	0	0	0	0	0.00%
Vacancy	0	0	0	0	6	6	1.97%
Total	304	268	25	5	6	304	100%

== Members ==
=== Senate ===
Places of registrations of the senators. Blue pogs are for cities and municipalities with one senator; those in red have two. Senators are elected at a nationwide, at-large basis.

The following are the terms of the senators of this Congress, according to the date of election:

- For senators elected on May 9, 2016: June 30, 2016 – June 30, 2022
- For senators elected on May 13, 2019: June 30, 2019 – June 30, 2025

Senator	Party	Term	Term end	Bloc	Registered in
Sonny Angara	LDP	2	2025	Majority	Baler, Aurora
Nancy Binay	UNA	2	2025	Majority	Makati
Pia Cayetano	Nacionalista	1	2025	Majority	Taguig
Leila de Lima	Liberal	1	2022	Minority	Parañaque
Ronald dela Rosa	PDP–Laban	1	2025	Majority	Santa Cruz, Davao del Sur
Franklin Drilon	Liberal	2	2022	Minority	Iloilo City
Win Gatchalian	NPC	1	2022	Majority	Valenzuela
Bong Go	PDP–Laban (Note: Bong Go was affiliated with Pederalismo ng Dugong Dakilang Samahan in 2021.)	1	2025	Majority	Davao City
Dick Gordon	Bagumbayan–VNP	1	2022	Majority	Olongapo
Risa Hontiveros	Akbayan	1	2022	Minority	Manila
Panfilo Lacson	Independent (Note: Panfilo Lacson was affiliated with Partido para sa Demokratikong Reporma from 2021 until 2022.)	1	2022	Majority	Imus, Cavite
Lito Lapid	NPC	1	2025	Majority	Porac, Pampanga
Imee Marcos	Nacionalista	1	2025	Majority	Batac, Ilocos Norte
Manny Pacquiao	PROMDI (Note: Manny Pacquiao became the honorary chairperson of PROMDI in 2021, while keeping his affiliation with PDP–Laban.)	1	2022	Majority	Kiamba, Sarangani
Kiko Pangilinan	Liberal	1	2022	Minority	Quezon City
Koko Pimentel	PDP–Laban	2	2025	Majority	Cagayan de Oro
Grace Poe	Independent	2	2025	Majority	San Juan
Ralph Recto	Nacionalista	2	2022	Majority	Lipa, Batangas
Bong Revilla	Lakas	1	2025	Majority	Bacoor, Cavite
Tito Sotto	NPC	2	2022	Majority	Quezon City
Francis Tolentino	PDP–Laban	1	2025	Majority	Tagaytay, Cavite
Joel Villanueva	Independent	1	2022	Majority	Bocaue, Bulacan
Cynthia Villar	Nacionalista	2	2025	Majority	Las Piñas
Juan Miguel Zubiri	Independent	1	2022	Majority	Malaybalay, Bukidnon

=== House of Representatives ===
Terms of members of the House of Representatives started on June 30, 2019, took office on July 22, 2019, and ended on June 30, 2022, unless stated otherwise.

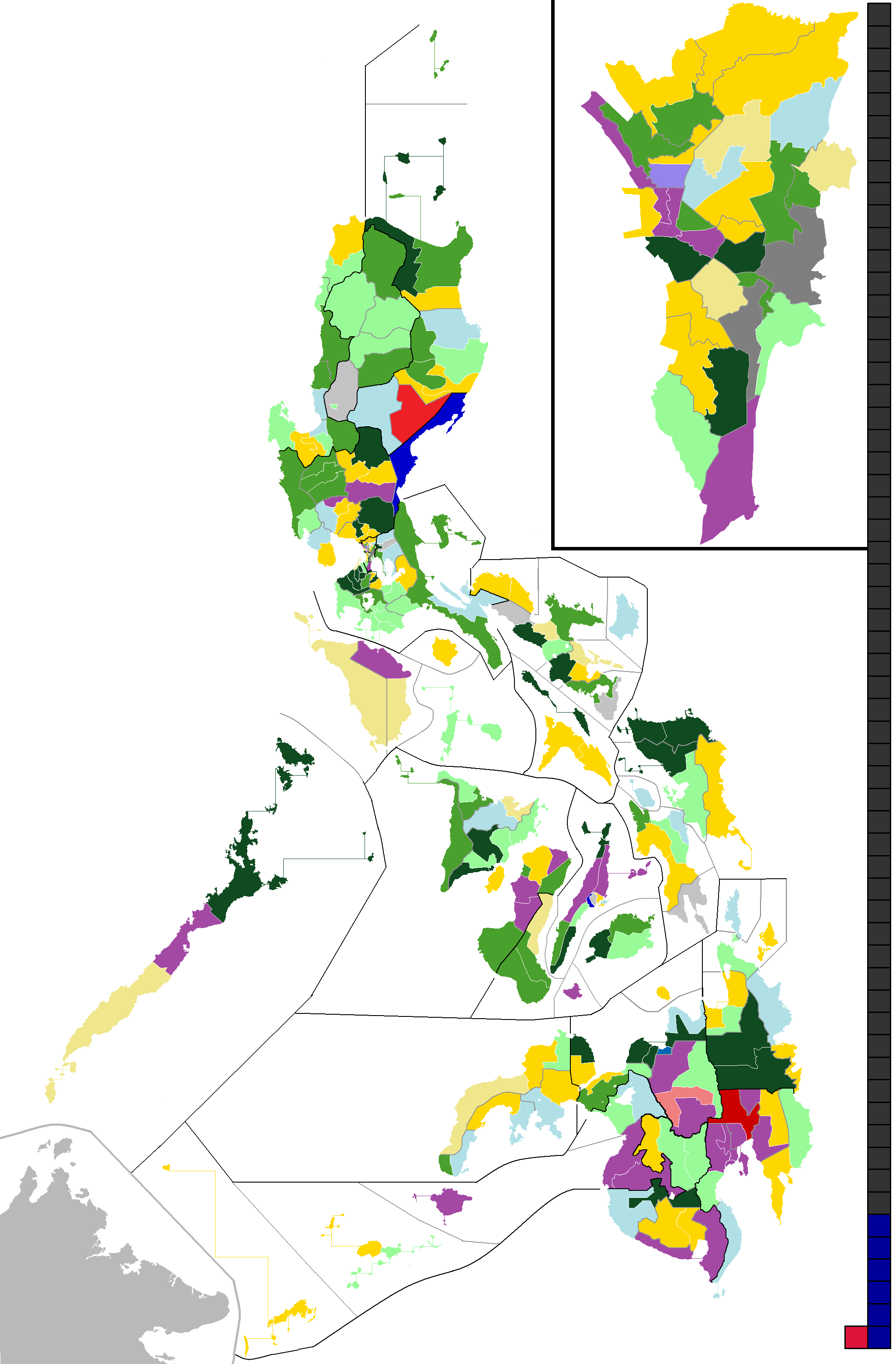
Party standings per district; party-lists are denoted by boxes to the right. Metro Manila is shown to the inset, at the upper right corner.

Map of provinces showing how many congressional districts it has. Metro Manila is shown to the inset, at the upper right corner.

Province/City	District	Representative	Party	Term	Bloc
Abra	Lone	Joseph Bernos	Nacionalista (Note: Affiliated with Asenso Abrenio at election.)	2	Majority
Agusan del Norte	1st	Lawrence Fortun	Nacionalista	3	Minority
Agusan del Norte	2nd	Angelica Amante	PDP–Laban	2	Majority
Agusan del Sur	1st	Alfel Bascug	NUP	1	Majority
Agusan del Sur	2nd	Eddiebong Plaza	NUP	1	Majority
Aklan	1st	Carlito Marquez	NPC	2	Majority
Aklan	2nd	Teodorico Haresco Jr.	Nacionalista	1	Majority
Albay	1st	Edcel Lagman	Liberal	2	Majority
Albay	2nd	Joey Salceda	PDP–Laban	2	Majority
Albay	3rd	Fernando Cabredo	NUP (Note: Affiliated with PDP–Laban at election.)	1	Majority
Antipolo	1st	Roberto Puno	NUP	1	Majority
Antipolo	2nd	Resurreccion Acop (Note: Resurreccion Acop died on May 28, 2021.)	NUP	1	Majority
Antique	Lone	Loren Legarda	NPC	1	Majority
Apayao	Lone	Elias Bulut Jr.	NPC	1	Majority
Aurora	Lone	Rommel T. Angara	LDP	1	Majority
Bacolod	Lone	Greg Gasataya	NPC	2	Majority
Baguio	Lone	Mark Go	Nacionalista	2	Majority
Basilan	Lone	Mujiv Hataman	BUP (Note: Affiliated with the Liberal Party at election.)	1	Majority
Bataan	1st	Geraldine Roman	Lakas	2	Majority
Bataan	2nd	Joet Garcia	PDP–Laban	2	Majority
Batanes	Lone	Jun Gato	NPC	1	Majority
Batangas	1st	Eileen Ermita-Buhain	Nacionalista	3	Majority
Batangas	2nd	Raneo Abu	Nacionalista	3	Majority
Batangas	3rd	Maria Theresa Collantes	NPC	2	Majority
Batangas	4th	Lianda Bolilia	Nacionalista	2	Majority
Batangas	5th	Marvey Mariño	Nacionalista	2	Majority
Batangas	6th	Vilma Santos	Nacionalista	2	Majority
Benguet	Lone	Nestor Fongwan (Note: Nestor Fongwan died on December 18, 2019.)	PDP–Laban	1	Majority
Biliran	Lone	Gerardo Espina Jr.	Lakas	1	Majority
Biñan	Lone	Len Alonte	PDP–Laban	2	Majority
Bohol	1st	Edgar Chatto	NUP	1	Majority
Bohol	2nd	Aris Aumentado	NPC	3	Majority
Bohol	3rd	Alexie Tutor	Nacionalista	1	Majority
Bukidnon	1st	Maria Lourdes Acosta-Alba	BPP	3	Majority
Bukidnon	2nd	Jonathan Keith Flores	Nacionalista	1	Majority
Bukidnon	3rd	Manuel Zubiri	BPP	2	Majority
Bukidnon	4th	Rogelio Neil Roque	PRP (Note: Affiliated with the Nacionalista Party at election.)	3	Majority
Bulacan	1st	Jose Antonio Sy-Alvarado	PDP–Laban (Note: Affiliated with the National Unity Party at election.)	2	Majority
Bulacan	2nd	Gavini Pancho	NUP	3	Majority
Bulacan	3rd	Lorna Silverio	NUP	2	Majority
Bulacan	4th	Henry Villarica	PDP–Laban	1	Majority
Cagayan	1st	Ramon Nolasco Jr.	NPC	1	Majority
Cagayan	2nd	Samantha Louise Vargas-Alfonso	NUP	1	Majority
Cagayan	3rd	Joseph Lara	PDP–Laban	1	Majority
Cagayan de Oro	1st	Rolando Uy	NUP	3	Majority
Cagayan de Oro	2nd	Rufus Rodriguez	CDP	1	Majority
Calamba	Lone	Jun Chipeco	Nacionalista	3	Majority
Caloocan	1st	Along Malapitan	PDP–Laban	2	Majority
Caloocan	2nd	Edgar Erice	Aksyon	3	Majority
Camarines Norte	1st	Josefina Tallado	PDP–Laban	1	Majority
Camarines Norte	2nd	Marisol Panotes (Note: Marisol Panotes died on April 29, 2022.)	PDP–Laban	2	Majority
Camarines Sur	1st	Marissa Mercado-Andaya (Note: Marissa Mercado-Andaya died on July 5, 2020.)	NPC	1	Majority
Camarines Sur	2nd	Luis Raymund Villafuerte	NUP	2	Majority
Camarines Sur	3rd	Gabriel Bordado	Liberal	2	Minority
Camarines Sur	4th	Arnulf Bryan Fuentebella	NPC	1	Majority
Camarines Sur	5th	Jocelyn Fortuno	Nacionalista	1	Majority
Camiguin	Lone	Xavier Jesus Romualdo	Lakas	3	Majority
Capiz	1st	Tawi Billones	Liberal	2	Majority
Capiz	2nd	Fredenil Castro	Lakas	3	Majority
Catanduanes	Lone	Hector Sanchez	Lakas (Note: Independent at election.)	1	Majority
Cavite	1st	Francis Gerald Abaya	Liberal	3	Majority
Cavite	2nd	Strike Revilla	Nacionalista	2	Majority
Cavite	3rd	Alex Advincula	NUP	3	Minority
Cavite	4th	Elpidio Barzaga Jr.	NUP	1	Majority
Cavite	5th	Dahlia Loyola	NPC	1	Majority
Cavite	6th	Luis Ferrer IV	NUP	3	Majority
Cavite	7th	Jesus Crispin Remulla	NUP	1	Majority
Cavite	8th	Abraham Tolentino	NUP	3	Majority
Cebu	1st	Eduardo Gullas	Nacionalista	1	Majority
Cebu	2nd	Wilfredo Caminero	NUP	3	Majority
Cebu	3rd	Pablo John Garcia	NUP	1	Majority
Cebu	4th	Janice Salimbangon	NUP	1	Majority
Cebu	5th	Duke Frasco	NUP (Note: Affiliated with Lakas–CMD at election.)	1	Majority
Cebu	6th	Emmarie Dizon	PDP–Laban	1	Majority
Cebu	7th	Peter John Calderon	NPC	2	Majority
Cebu City	1st	Raul del Mar (Note: Raul del Mar died on November 16, 2020.)	Liberal	3	Independent minority
Cebu City	2nd	Rodrigo Abellanosa	LDP	3	Independent minority
Cotabato	1st	Joselito Sacdalan	PDP–Laban	1	Majority
Cotabato	2nd	Rudy Caoagdan	Nacionalista	1	Majority
Cotabato	3rd	Jose Tejada	Nacionalista	3	Majority
Davao City	1st	Paolo Duterte	HNP (Note: Affiliated with Hugpong sa Tawong Lungsod at election.)	1	Majority
Davao City	2nd	Vincent Garcia	HNP	1	Majority
Davao City	3rd	Isidro Ungab	HNP	1	Independent minority
Davao de Oro	1st	Manuel E. Zamora	HNP	1	Majority
Davao de Oro	2nd	Ruwel Peter Gonzaga	PDP–Laban	2	Majority
Davao del Norte	1st	Pantaleon Alvarez	Reporma	2	Independent minority
Davao del Norte	2nd	Alan Dujali	HNP	1	Majority
Davao del Sur	Lone	Mercedes Cagas	Nacionalista	3	Majority
Davao Occidental	Lone	Lorna Bautista-Bandigan	Lakas (Note: Affiliated with the Nationalist People's Coalition at election.)	2	Majority
Davao Oriental	1st	Corazon Malanyaon	Nacionalista	2	Majority
Davao Oriental	2nd	Joel Mayo Almario	PDP–Laban	2	Majority
Dinagat Islands	Lone	Alan Ecleo	Lakas	1	Majority
Eastern Samar	Lone	Maria Fe Abunda	PDP–Laban	1	Majority
Guimaras	Lone	Lucille Nava	PDP–Laban	2	Majority
Ifugao	Lone	Solomon Chungalao	NPC	1	Majority
Iligan	Lone	Frederick Siao	Nacionalista	2	Majority
Ilocos Norte	1st	Ria Christina Fariñas	PDP–Laban	1	Majority
Ilocos Norte	2nd	Eugenio Angelo Barba	Nacionalista	1	Majority
Ilocos Sur	1st	Deogracias Victor Savellano	Nacionalista	2	Majority
Ilocos Sur	2nd	Kristine Singson-Meehan	NPC (Note: Affiliated with the Bileg Party at election.)	1	Majority
Iloilo	1st	Janette Garin	NUP	1	Minority
Iloilo	2nd	Michael Gorriceta	Nacionalista	1	Majority
Iloilo	3rd	Lorenz Defensor	NUP	1	Majority
Iloilo	4th	Braeden John Biron	Nacionalista	1	Majority
Iloilo	5th	Raul Tupas	Nacionalista	2	Majority
Iloilo City	Lone	Julienne Baronda	NUP	1	Majority
Isabela	1st	Tonypet Albano	Lakas	1	Majority
Isabela	2nd	Ed Christopher Go	Nacionalista	1	Majority
Isabela	3rd	Ian Paul Dy	NPC	1	Majority
Isabela	4th	Alyssa Sheena Tan-Dy	PDP–Laban (Note: Affiliated with Partido Federal ng Pilipinas at election.)	1	Majority
Isabela	5th	Mike Dy III	NPC	1	Majority
Isabela	6th	Inno Dy	PDP–Laban	1	Majority
Kalinga	Lone	Allen Jesse Mangaoang	Nacionalista	2	Majority
La Union	1st	Pablo Ortega	NPC	2	Majority
La Union	2nd	Sandra Eriguel	Lakas	2	Majority
Laguna	1st	Dan Fernandez	PDP–Laban	1	Minority
Laguna	2nd	Ruth Hernandez	PDP–Laban	1	Majority
Laguna	3rd	Sol Aragones	Nacionalista	3	Majority
Laguna	4th	Benjamin Agarao Jr.	PDP–Laban	3	Independent minority
Lanao del Norte	1st	Mohamad Khalid Dimaporo	PDP–Laban	2	Majority
Lanao del Norte	2nd	Abdullah Dimaporo	NPC	3	Majority
Lanao del Sur	1st	Ansaruddin Alonto Adiong	Nacionalista	3	Majority
Lanao del Sur	2nd	Yasser Balindong	Lakas	1	Majority
Lapu-Lapu City	Lone	Paz Radaza	Lakas	1	Majority
Las Piñas	Lone	Camille Villar	Nacionalista	1	Majority
Leyte	1st	Martin Romualdez	Lakas	1	Majority
Leyte	2nd	Lolita Javier	Nacionalista	1	Majority
Leyte	3rd	Vicente Veloso III	NPC	2	Majority
Leyte	4th	Lucy Torres-Gomez	PDP–Laban	3	Majority
Leyte	5th	Carl Cari	PDP–Laban	1	Majority
Maguindanao	1st	Datu Roonie Sinsuat Sr.	UBJP	1	Majority
Maguindanao	2nd	Esmael Mangudadatu	UBJP	1	Majority
Makati	1st	Kid Peña	Liberal	1	Majority
Makati	2nd	Luis Campos	NPC	2	Minority
Malabon	Lone	Josephine Lacson-Noel	NPC	1	Majority
Mandaluyong	Lone	Neptali Gonzales II	NUP	1	Majority
Manila	1st	Manny Lopez	PDP–Laban	2	Majority
Manila	2nd	Rolan Valeriano	NUP (Note: Affiliated with Asenso Manileño at election.)	1	Majority
Manila	3rd	Yul Servo	Aksyon	2	Majority
Manila	4th	Edward Maceda	NPC (Note: Affiliated with Pwersa ng Masang Pilipino at election.)	2	Majority
Manila	5th	Cristal Bagatsing	NUP (Note: Affiliated with Kabalikat ng Bayan sa Kaunlaran at election.)	2	Majority
Manila	6th	Benny Abante	NUP	1	Minority
Marikina	1st	Bayani Fernando	NPC	2	Minority
Marikina	2nd	Stella Quimbo	Liberal	1	Minority
Marinduque	Lone	Lord Allan Velasco	PDP–Laban	2	Majority
Masbate	1st	Narciso Bravo Jr.	NUP	1	Majority
Masbate	2nd	Olga Kho	PDP–Laban	3	Majority
Masbate	3rd	Wilton Kho	PDP–Laban	1	Majority
Misamis Occidental	1st	Diego Ty	NUP	1	Majority
Misamis Occidental	2nd	Henry Oaminal	Nacionalista	3	Majority
Misamis Oriental	1st	Christian Unabia	Lakas	1	Majority
Misamis Oriental	2nd	Juliette Uy	NUP	3	Majority
Mountain Province	Lone	Maximo Dalog Jr.	Nacionalista	1	Majority
Muntinlupa	Lone	Ruffy Biazon	One Muntinlupa	2	Majority
Navotas	Lone	John Rey Tiangco	Navoteño	1	Majority
Negros Occidental	1st	Gerardo Valmayor Jr.	NPC	1	Majority
Negros Occidental	2nd	Leo Rafael Cueva	NUP	3	Majority
Negros Occidental	3rd	Jose Francisco Benitez	PDP–Laban	1	Majority
Negros Occidental	4th	Yoyette Ferrer	NUP	2	Majority
Negros Occidental	5th	Maria Lourdes Arroyo	Lakas	1	Majority
Negros Occidental	6th	Genaro Alvarez Jr.	NPC	1	Majority
Negros Oriental	1st	Jocelyn Limkaichong	Liberal	2	Majority
Negros Oriental	2nd	Manuel Sagarbarria	NPC	2	Majority
Negros Oriental	3rd	Arnie Teves	NPC	2	Minority
Northern Samar	1st	Paul Daza	NUP	1	Majority
Northern Samar	2nd	Jose Ong Jr.	NUP	1	Majority
Nueva Ecija	1st	Estrellita Suansing	PDP–Laban	3	Majority
Nueva Ecija	2nd	Micaela Violago	NUP	2	Majority
Nueva Ecija	3rd	Rosanna Vergara	PDP–Laban	2	Majority
Nueva Ecija	4th	Maricel Natividad-Nagaño	Unang Sigaw (Note: Affiliated with the People's Reform Party at election.)	1	Majority
Nueva Vizcaya	Lone	Luisa Cuaresma	Lakas	2	Majority
Occidental Mindoro	Lone	Josephine Sato	Liberal	3	Majority
Oriental Mindoro	1st	Paulino Salvador Leachon	MBS	3	Majority
Oriental Mindoro	2nd	Alfonso Umali Jr.	Liberal	1	Majority
Palawan	1st	Franz Alvarez	NUP	3	Majority
Palawan	2nd	Beng Abueg	Liberal (Note: Affiliated with Partido Pagbabago ng Palawan at election.)	1	Majority
Palawan	3rd	Gil Acosta Jr.	PPPL	1	Majority
Pampanga	1st	Carmelo Lazatin II	PDP–Laban	2	Majority
Pampanga	2nd	Mikey Arroyo	Lakas	1	Majority
Pampanga	3rd	Aurelio Gonzales Jr.	PDP–Laban	2	Majority
Pampanga	4th	Juan Pablo Bondoc	PDP–Laban	3	Majority
Pangasinan	1st	Arnold Celeste	Nacionalista	1	Majority
Pangasinan	2nd	Jumel Anthony Espino	PDP–Laban	1	Majority
Pangasinan	3rd	Rose Marie Arenas	PDP–Laban	3	Majority
Pangasinan	4th	Christopher de Venecia	Lakas	2	Majority
Pangasinan	5th	Ramon Guico III	Nacionalista	1	Majority
Pangasinan	6th	Tyrone Agabas	NPC	1	Majority
Parañaque	1st	Eric Olivarez	PDP–Laban	3	Majority
Parañaque	2nd	Joy Myra Tambunting	NUP	1	Majority
Pasay	Lone	Antonino Calixto	PDP–Laban	1	Majority
Pasig	Lone	Roman Romulo	Independent (Note: Affiliated with Aksyon Demokratiko at election.)	1	Majority
Quezon	1st	Mark Enverga	NPC	1	Majority
Quezon	2nd	David C. Suarez	Nacionalista	1	Majority
Quezon	3rd	Aleta Suarez	Lakas	1	Majority
Quezon	4th	Angelina Tan	NPC	3	Majority
Quezon City	1st	Anthony Peter Crisologo	Lakas	1	Majority
Quezon City	2nd	Precious Hipolito	Lakas	1	Majority
Quezon City	3rd	Allan Benedict Reyes	NPC	1	Majority
Quezon City	4th	Bong Suntay	PDP–Laban	1	Majority
Quezon City	5th	Alfred Vargas	PDP–Laban	3	Majority
Quezon City	6th	Kit Belmonte	Liberal	3	Minority
Quirino	Lone	Junie Cua	PDDS	1	Majority
Rizal	1st	Jack Duavit	NPC	2	Majority
Rizal	2nd	Fidel Nograles	Lakas	1	Majority
Romblon	Lone	Eleandro Jesus Madrona	Nacionalista	1	Majority
Samar	1st	Edgar Mary Sarmiento	NUP	2	Majority
Samar	2nd	Sharee Ann Tan	Nacionalista	1	Minority
San Jose del Monte	Lone	Florida Robes	PDP–Laban	2	Majority
San Juan	Lone	Ronaldo Zamora	PDP–Laban	3	Majority
Sarangani	Lone	Rogelio Pacquiao	PCM	2	Majority
Siquijor	Lone	Jake Vincent Villa	NPC	1	Majority
Sorsogon	1st	Evelina Escudero	NPC	3	Majority
Sorsogon	2nd	Bernardita Ramos (Note: Bernardita Ramos died on September 8, 2020.)	NPC	1	Majority
South Cotabato	1st	Shirlyn Bañas-Nograles (Note: Shirlyn Bañas-Nograles took office on November 4, 2019.)	PDP–Laban	0	Majority
South Cotabato	2nd	Dinand Hernandez	PDP–Laban	3	Majority
Southern Leyte	Lone	Roger Mercado (Note: Roger Mercado took office on December 16, 2019. He later resigned on October 13, 2021, upon being appointed as Secretary of Public Works and Highways.)	Lakas	0	Majority
Sultan Kudarat	1st	Rihan Sakaluran	Lakas	1	Majority
Sultan Kudarat	2nd	Horacio Suansing Jr.	NUP	2	Majority
Sulu	1st	Samier Tan	PDP–Laban	1	Majority
Sulu	2nd	Abdulmunir Arbison	Nacionalista	2	Majority
Surigao del Norte	1st	Francisco Jose Matugas II	PDP–Laban	2	Majority
Surigao del Norte	2nd	Ace Barbers	Nacionalista	2	Majority
Surigao del Sur	1st	Prospero Pichay Jr.	Lakas	2	Majority
Surigao del Sur	2nd	Johnny Pimentel	PDP–Laban	2	Majority
Taguig–Pateros	1st	Alan Peter Cayetano	Independent	1	Majority
Taguig	2nd	Lani Cayetano	Nacionalista	1	Majority
Tarlac	1st	Charlie Cojuangco (Note: Charlie Cojuangco died on February 22, 2022.)	NPC	2	Majority
Tarlac	2nd	Victor Yap	NPC	2	Majority
Tarlac	3rd	Noel Villanueva	NPC	3	Majority
Tawi-Tawi	Lone	Rashidin Matba	PDP–Laban	1	Majority
Valenzuela	1st	Wes Gatchalian	NPC	2	Majority
Valenzuela	2nd	Eric Martinez	PDP–Laban	2	Majority
Zambales	1st	Jeffrey Khonghun	Nacionalista	3	Majority
Zambales	2nd	Cheryl Deloso-Montalla	NPC	3	Majority
Zamboanga City	1st	Cesar Jimenez Jr.	NPC	2	Majority
Zamboanga City	2nd	Mannix Dalipe	Lakas	2	Majority
Zamboanga del Norte	1st	Jon-jon Jalosjos	Nacionalista	1	Majority
Zamboanga del Norte	2nd	Glona Labadlabad	PDP–Laban	2	Majority
Zamboanga del Norte	3rd	Isagani Amatong	Liberal	3	Minority
Zamboanga del Sur	1st	Divina Grace Yu	PDP–Laban	2	Majority
Zamboanga del Sur	2nd	Leonardo Babasa Jr.	Lakas	1	Majority
Zamboanga Sibugay	1st	Wilter Palma II	Lakas	2	Majority
Zamboanga Sibugay	2nd	Dulce Ann Hofer	PDP–Laban	3	Majority
Party-list		Mikee Romero	1-Pacman	2	Majority
Party-list		Enrico Pineda	1-Pacman	2	Majority
Party-list		Maria Victoria Umali	A Teacher	1	Minority
Party-list		Sharon Garin	AAMBIS-Owa	4	Majority
Party-list		Joseph Stephen Paduano	Abang Lingkod	2	Minority
Party-list		Conrado Estrella III	Abono	3	Majority
Party-list		France Castro	ACT Teachers	2	Independent minority
Party-list		Eric Yap	ACT-CIS	1	Majority
Party-list		Jocelyn Tulfo	ACT-CIS	1	Majority
Party-list		Rowena Niña Taduran	ACT-CIS	1	Majority
Party-list		Rico Geron	AGAP	3	Majority
Party-list		Alfredo Garbin	Ako Bicol	2	Minority
Party-list		Zaldy Co	Ako Bicol	1	Majority
Party-list		Sonny Lagon	Ako Bisaya	1	Majority
Party-list		Adriano Ebcas	Ako Padayon	1	Majority
Party-list		Anna Suarez	ALONA	2	Minority
Party-list		Amihilda Sangcopan	AMIN	1	Independent minority
Party-list		Bem Noel	An Waray	1	Majority
Party-list		Mike Defensor	Anakalusugan	1	Majority
Party-list		Alfred delos Santos	Ang Probinsyano	1	Majority
Party-list		Ronnie Ong	Ang Probinsyano	1	Majority
Party-list		Sergio Dagooc	APEC	1	Minority
Party-list		Bernadette Herrera	BH	2	Majority
Party-list		Naealla Rose Bainto-Aguinaldo	Bahay	1	Majority
Party-list		Carlos Isagani Zarate	Bayan Muna	2	Independent minority
Party-list		Ferdinand Gaite	Bayan Muna	1	Independent minority
Party-list		Eufemia Cullamat	Bayan Muna	1	Independent minority
Party-list		Angelica Natasha Co	BHW	1	Minority
Party-list		Lito Atienza	Buhay	2	Minority
Party-list		Eddie Villanueva	CIBAC	1	Majority
Party-list		Domingo Rivera	CIBAC	1	Majority
Party-list		Sabiniano Canama	Coop-NATCCO	2	Majority
Party-list		Romeo Momo	CWS	1	Majority
Party-list		Michael Edgar Aglipay	DIWA	1	Majority
Party-list		Claudine Bautista-Lim	DUMPER	1	Majority
Party-list		Ducielle Cardema (Note: Ducielle Cardema took office on October 13, 2020.)	Duterte Youth	1	Majority
Party-list		Arlene Brosas	Gabriela	2	Minority
Party-list		Jose Gay Padiernos	GP	1	Majority
Party-list		Sarah Elago	Kabataan	2	Minority
Party-list		Ron Salo	Kabayan	2	Majority
Party-list		Irene Gay Saulog	Kalinga	1	Minority
Party-list		Shernee Tan-Tambut	Kusug Tausug	2	Majority
Party-list		Rodolfo Albano Jr. (Note: Rodolfo Albano Jr. died on November 5, 2019.)	LPGMA	1	Majority
Party-list		Allan Ty (Note: Allan Ty took office on November 20, 2019, to succeed Rodolfo Albano Jr.)	LPGMA	1	Majority
Party-list		Manuel Cabochan	Magdalo	1	Majority
Party-list		Argel Joseph Cabatbat	Magsasaka	1	Minority
Party-list		Virgilio Lacson	Manila Teachers	2	Majority
Party-list		Carlo Lisandro Gonzalez	Marino	1	Majority
Party-list		Jose Antonio Lopez (Note: Jose Antonio Lopez resigned on July 25, 2019.)	Marino	1	Majority
Party-list		Macnell Lusotan (Note: Macnell Lusotan took office on November 4, 2019, to succeed Jose Antonio Lopez.)	Marino	1	Majority
Party-list		Bobby Pacquiao	OFW Family	1	Majority
Party-list		Jorge Antonio Bustos	Patrol	1	Majority
Party-list		Jericho Nograles	PBA	2	Majority
Party-list		Presley de Jesus	Philreca	1	Majority
Party-list		Rudys Caesar Fariñas	Probinsyano Ako	1	Majority
Party-list		Jose Singson Jr.	Probinsyano Ako	1	Minority
Party-list		Aloysia Lim	RAM	1	Majority
Party-list		Godofredo Guya	Recoboda	1	Minority
Party-list		Rodante Marcoleta	SAGIP	2	Majority
Party-list		Francisco Datol Jr. (Note: Francisco Datol Jr. took office on December 4, 2019. He later died on August 10, 2020.)	Senior Citizens	2	Majority
Party-list		Rodolfo Ordanes (Note: Rodolfo Ordanes took office on October 13, 2020, to succeed Francisco Datol Jr.)	Senior Citizens	0	Majority
Party-list		Jose Teves Jr.	TGP	1	Majority
Party-list		Yedda Marie Romualdez	Tingog	2	Majority
Party-list		Raymond Mendoza	TUCP	1	Majority

== Committees ==
=== Constitutional bodies ===
Committee	Senate				House of Representatives					
Committee	Chairman	Party	Minority leader	Party	Chairman	Party	District	Minority leader	Party	District
Commission on Appointments	Tito Sotto	NPC	Francis Pangilinan	Liberal	Ronaldo Zamora	PDP–Laban	San Juan	Alex Advincula	NUP	Cavite–3rd
Electoral tribunals	Pia Cayetano	Nacionalista	Franklin Drilon	Liberal	Dale Malapitan	PDP–Laban	Caloocan–1st			
Judicial and Bar Council	Dick Gordon	Independent	—N/a		Vicente Veloso	NUP	Leyte–3rd	—N/a		

== Agenda ==
=== Death penalty ===
As of July 2019, bills seeking to reinstate capital punishment in the Philippines have been revived in the Senate ahead of the opening of the 18th Congress.

=== COVID-19 pandemic ===
The 18th Congress enacted the Bayanihan to Heal as One Act and Bayanihan to Recover as One Act as response to the COVID-19 pandemic in the Philippines.

=== ABS-CBN franchise renewal ===
In May 2020, the House of Representatives acted on the pending franchise renewal bills of ABS-CBN that has been pending since July 2019.

=== House Speakership crisis ===
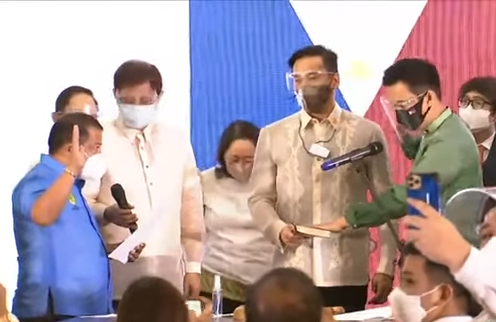
Lord Allan Velasco (right) takes his oath of office as House Speaker on October 12, 2020

In 2020, the position of Speaker was disputed, which in the latter part of the year threatened the passage of a bill legislating the national government's budget for 2021. The dispute involved then-speaker and Pateros–Taguig representative Alan Peter Cayetano and Marinduque representative Lord Allan Velasco. This started in July 2019, when the two had a "term-sharing agreement" which was brokered by President Rodrigo Duterte. Under that deal, Cayetano would serve as House Speaker for the first 15 months of the 18th Congress, or until October 2020. Cayetano was to step down from his position as speaker in order to give way for the election of Velasco as speaker.

Cayetano, in March 2020, accused Velasco and his camp of a conspiracy to remove him from his position as House Speaker. Velasco denied Cayetano's allegation of supposed ouster plot, stating it "baseless." Cayetano initially oversaw deliberations on the 2021 national budget but tensions in the lower house of the Congress grew by September 2020. His camp abruptly ended sessions in which some legislators criticizing the move which prevented them from scrutinizing proposals on the 2021 budget.

Cayetano offered to resign but his camp claim that majority of the House of Representatives declined his resignation. On October 12, 2020, Lord Allan Velasco and some legislators convened at the Celebrity Sports Complex in Quezon City and conducted a house session where positions including the speakership was declared vacant and appointed Velasco as house speaker. Velasco's camp claimed that 186 lawmakers voted for his appointment as house speaker. Cayetano's camp declared the session a "travesty" and questioned the legality of the session itself. Cayetano maintained that he remains as house speaker. On the other hand, Cayetano called the appointment of Velasco as a speaker a "fake session" as he added that there was no prior plenary resolution authorizing the holding of a session outside the Batasang Pambansa and insists that the House of Representative mace used in the meeting is illegal.

On October 13, 2020, during the start of the special session of the House, Velasco's election as House Speaker on October 12, 2020 was formally ratified by 186 representatives assembled in the Batasang Pambansa. At the same time, Cayetano tendered his "irrevocable" resignation as House Speaker on his Facebook Live paving the way for Velasco to assume his position undisputed.

== Changes in membership ==
=== House of Representatives ===
==== District representatives ====
District	Vacating member				Caretaker	Special election	Successor		
District	Member	Party	Date	Reason	Caretaker	Special election	Member	Party	Date
Benguet	Nestor Fongwan	PDP–Laban	December 18, 2019	Died in office	Eric Yap	Not held			
Camarines Sur–1st	Marissa Mercado-Andaya	NPC	July 5, 2020	Died in office	Michael John Duavit	Not held			
Sorsogon–2nd	Bernardita Ramos	NPC	September 8, 2020	Died in office	Evelina Escudero	Not held			
Cebu City–1st	Raul del Mar	Liberal	November 16, 2020	Died in office	Lord Allan Velasco	Not held			
Antipolo–2nd	Resurreccion Acop	NUP	May 28, 2021	Died in office	Lord Allan Velasco	Not held			
Southern Leyte	Roger Mercado	Lakas	October 13, 2021	Appointed Secretary of Public Works and Highways		Not held			
Tarlac–1st	Carlos Cojuangco	NPC	February 22, 2022	Died in office		Not held			
Camarines Norte–2nd	Marisol Panotes	PDP–Laban	April 29, 2022	Died in office		Not held			

==== Party-list representatives ====
Member	Party	Date	Reason	Successor	Took office
Jose Antonio Lopez	MARINO	July 25, 2019	Resigned	Macnell Lusotan	November 4, 2019
Rodolfo Albano Jr.	LPGMA	November 5, 2019	Died in office	Allan Ty	November 20, 2019
Francisco Datol Jr.	SENIOR CITIZENS	August 10, 2020	Died in office	Rodolfo Ordanes	October 13, 2020

== Legislation ==
=== Republic Acts ===
The 18th Congress passed a total of 311 bills which were signed into law by President Rodrigo Duterte. 119 of these laws were national in scope, while 192 were local:

Republic Act	Short title	Sponsor(s)	Third reading votes (Yea–nay–abstention)		Presidential action
Republic Act	Short title	Sponsor(s)	House	Senate	Presidential action
RA 11462	Postponing the May 2020 Barangay and Sangguniang Kabataan Elections	Sen. Imee Marcos	194–6	21–0	Signed December 3, 2019
RA 11463	Malasakit Centers Act	Sen. Bong Go	186–1–7	18–0	Signed December 3, 2019
RA 11464	Reenacting the General Appropriations Act of 2019	Rep. Isidro Ungab	193–0	19–0	Signed December 20, 2019
RA 11465: Vol I-A; Vol I-B; Vol I-C; Vol II	General Appropriations Act of 2020	Rep. Isidro Ungab, Eileen Ermita-Buhain, Estrellita Suansing	257–6	22–0	Signed January 6, 2020
RA 11466	Salary Standardization Law of 2019	Sen. Bong Revilla	187–5	21–0–1	Signed January 8, 2020
RA 11467	Amendments to the National Internal Revenue Code of 1997	Rep. Joey Salceda, Estrellita Suansing, Sharon Garin	184–2–1	20–0	Signed January 22. 2020, with line vetoes
RA 11468	The National Day of Remembrance For Road Crash Victims, Survivors, and Their Families Act	Sen. Grace Poe	234–0	20–0	Signed January 23, 2020
RA 11469	Bayanihan to Heal as One Act	Sen. Tito Sotto, Pia Cayetano	284–9	20–1	Signed March 24, 2020
RA 11470	The National Academy of Sports	Sen. Sherwin Gatchalian	206–0	21–0	Signed June 9, 2020
RA 11471	Creating Barangay H-2 in Dasmariñas, Cavite	Rep. Elpidio Barzaga Jr.	213–0	20–0	Signed June 19, 2020
RA 11472	Upgrading the Caraga Regional Hospital	Rep. Robert Ace Barbers	170–0	18–0	Signed June 19, 2020
RA 11473	Renaming the Talisay District Hospital into Cebu South Medical Center in Cebu	Rep. Eduardo Gullas	182–0	20–0	Signed June 19, 2020
RA 11474	Upgrading the Maria L. Eleazar District Hospital in Quezon	Rep. Alyssa Sheena Tan	231–0	20–0	Signed June 19, 2020
RA 11475	Transferring of Rizal's capital from Pasig to Antipolo	Rep. Roberto Puno	213–0	19–0	Signed June 19, 2020
RA 11476	GMRC and Values Education Act	Sen. Sherwin Gatchalian	225–0	23–0	Signed June 25, 2020
RA 11477	Granting of franchise to Golden Broadcast Professional, Inc	Rep. Cesar Jimenez Jr.	216–0–1	18–0	Signed June 25, 2020
RA 11478	Increasing the bed capacity of Bicol Medical Center in Naga	Sen. Bong Go	182–0	14–0	Signed July 1, 2020
RA 11479	Anti-Terrorism Act of 2020	Sen. Panfilo Lacson	168–36–29	19–2	Signed July 3, 2020
RA 11480	Changing the opening day of schools	Sen. Sherwin Gatchalian	241–0	23–0	Signed July 17, 2020
RA 11481	Granting of franchise to First United Broadcasting Corporation	Rep. Aurelio Gonzales	222–0	19–0	Signed July 30, 2020
RA 11482	Granting of franchise to Broadcast Enterprises and Affiliated Media	Rep. Xavier Jesus Romualdo	220–0	19–0	Signed July 30, 2020
RA 11483	Converting several provincial roads in Tarlac into national roads	Rep. Victor Yap	231–0	23–0	Signed August 14, 2020
RA 11484	Converting road connecting Tubao, La Union and Tuba, Benguet into a national roat	Rep. Sandra Eriguel	231–0	23–0	Signed August 14, 2020
RA 11485	Converting the Guimba–Talugtug–Umingan Provincial Road into a national road	Rep. Estrellita Suansing	231–0	23–0	Signed August 14, 2020
RA 11486	Converting the road network connecting San Fernando and Bula, Camarines Sur into a national road	Rep. Luis Raymond Villafuerte	231–0	23–0	Signed August 14, 2020
RA 11487	Converting the Albay Diversion Road in Camarines Sur into a national road	Rep. Luis Raymond Villafuerte	231–0	23–0	Signed August 14, 2020
RA 11488	Transferring the Sorsogon Second District Engineering Office from Bulan to Gubat.	Rep. Bernadita Ramos	222–0	23–0	Signed August 14, 2020
RA 11489	Creating the Cebu Seventh District Engineering Office	Rep. Peter John Calderon	222–0	23–0	Signed August 14, 2020
RA 11490	Creating the Cotabato Third District Engineering Office	Rep. Elandro Madrona	232–0	23–0	Signed August 14, 2020
RA 11491	Granting of franchise to Crusaders Broadcasting System	Rep. Onyx Crisologo	226–0	19–0	Signed August 14, 2020
RA 11492	Granting of franchise to Gold Label Broadcasting System	Rep. Manuel Sagarbarria	233–0–1	18–0	Signed August 14, 2020
RA 11493	Granting of franchise to Bicol Broadcasting System	Rep. Salvio Fortuno	170–0	19–0	Signed August 14, 2020
RA 11494	Bayanihan to Recover as One Act	Sen. Sonny Angara	242–6	22–1	Signed September 11, 2020

=== Treaties ===
One treaty has been approved by the Senate:

Resolution number	Title	Foreign party	Vote	Date of approval
Resolution 34	RP-Russian Federation Treaty on Extradition	Russia	19–0	December 18, 2019
