= Nominees in the 2013 Philippine House of Representatives party-list election =

These are nominees of the parties participating in the 2013 Philippine House of Representatives party-list election. The parties are ordered by the appearance on the ballot. A voter can vote for only one party, and a party can only win up to three seats. The winning nominees are determined by the order of which they are listed by the party (closed list). The party may submit a list of up to ten nominees.

Only the first three nominees (the maximum a party is allowed to win at any one time) are listed here. Winning party-lists and their elected nominees are in bold.

There are instances where a party submitted two or more lists. In this case, the Commission on Elections shall determine from which amongst the lists would be used to determine which nominees win the allocated seats.

== Nominees ==
1. **1st Consumers Alliance for Rural Energy (1-CARE)**
  1. **Edgardo Masongsong**
  2. **Michael Angelo Rivera** (incumbent)
  3. Concordio Quisaot
2. **Arts, Business and Science Professionals (ABS)**
  1. **Catalina Leonen-Pizarro** (incumbent)
  2. Eugene Michael de Vera
  3. Catalina Lanting
3. Pasang Masda
  1. Roberto Martin
  2. Ferdinand Topacio
  3. Raul Raquid
4. **OFW Family Club (OFW Family)**
  1. **Roy Señeres**
  2. **Johnny Revilla**
  3. Roy Señeres Jr.
5. **Magdalo para sa Pilipino (Magdalo)**
  1. **Gary Alejano**
  2. **Francisco Ashley Acedillo**
  3. Manuel Cabochan
6. Alyansa ng Media at Showbiz (AMS)
  1. Rolando Gonzalo
  2. Leo Martinez
  3. Nick Ferrer
7. **Abono**
  1. **Conrado Estrella III**
  2. **Francisco Ortega III** (incumbent)
  3. Erika Caitlin Dy
8. Bayani
  1. Guiling Mamondlong
  2. Homer Bueno
  3. Fitrilyn Dalhani
9. **Advocacy for Teacher Empowerment Through Action, Cooperation and Harmony Towards Educational Reforms (A Teacher)**
  1. **Mariano Piamonte Jr.** (incumbent)
  2. **Julieta Cortuna** (incumbent)
  3. Nenita Habulan
10. Pilipinos with Disabilities (PWD)
  1. Michael Barredo
  2. Manuel Agcaoili
  3. Adeline Anchieta
11. Isang Lapian ng Mangingisda at Bayan Tungo sa Kaunlaran (1-Lambat)
  1. Reynaldo Soriano
  2. Eurie Rafael Manalo
  3. Eleanor Sanchez
12. Alliance of Advocates in Mining Advancement for National Progress (AAMA)
  1. Rafael Baniqued Jr.
  2. Lomino Kaniteng
  3. Michael Jobert Marasigan
13. Bagong Henerasyon (BH)
  1. Bernadette Herrera (incumbent)
  2. Katherine Rose Gancayco
  3. Redentor Tuazon
14. Sanlakas
  1. Marie Marguerite Lopez
  2. Flora Santos
  3. Jose Aaron Pedrosa Jr.
15. Aksyon Magsasaka Partido Tinig ng Masa (AKMA-PTM)
  1. Michael Kida
  2. Catherine Trinidad
  3. Saidamen Limgas
16. Ako An Bisaya Party (AAB) (Note: Disqualified and excluded from the ballot.)
17. **Kabataan Partylist (Kabataan)**
  1. **Terry Ridon**
  2. Asher Allunar
  3. Bai Ali Indayla
18. **Ako Bicol Political Party (AKB)**
  - First list:
    1. **Christopher Co** (incumbent)
    2. **Rodel Batocabe** (incumbent)
    3. Alfredo Garbin (incumbent)
  - Second list:
    1. Emilio Ubaldo Jr.
    2. Pedro Ravanilla
    3. Rus Kristoffer Parcia
19. Ang Agrikultura Natin Isulong (AANI)
  1. Joffrey Hapitan
  2. Antonio Gonzales
  3. Jose Policarpio Jr.
20. United Movement Against Drug Foundation (UNI-MAD)
  1. Teodoro Lim
  2. Maruja Jadoc
  3. Harry Lorenzo Jr.
21. Action League of Indigenous Masses (ALIM)
  1. Don Ferdinand Daquial
  2. Francisco Muñez
  3. Muamar Macaraya
22. **Alay Buhay Community Development Foundation (Alay Buhay)**
  1. **Wes Gatchalian** (incumbent)
  2. Antonio Sayo
  3. Rodolfo Mallari
23. **An Waray**
  1. **Neil Benedict Montejo**
  2. Jude Acidre
  3. Victoria Isabel Noel (Note: Victoria Isabel Noel took office as An Waray's second representative despite the party-list winning only one seat.)
24. Alagad ng Sining (ASIN)
25. Puwersa ng Bayaning Atleta (PBA)
  1. Mark Aeron Sambar (incumbent)
  2. Sol Angelie Libanan
  3. ZC Torres
26. FIRM 24-K Association Inc. (FIRM 24-K)
  1. Artemio Lachica
  2. Naomi Licuanan
  3. Rodolfo Santoyo Jr.
27. **Trade Union Congress Party (TUCP)**
  - First list:
    1. **Raymond Mendoza** (incumbent) (Note: Raymond Mendoza took office on July 30, 2013.)
    2. Anthony Sasin
    3. Miguel Niez
  - Second list:
    1. Roland de la Cruz
    2. Alejandro Villaviza
    3. Ternistocles Dejon Jr.
28. Ang Ladlad
  1. Bembol Aleeh Benedicto
  2. Danton Remoto
  3. Raymond Paolo Alikpala
29. Advance Community Development in New Generation (ADING)
  1. Fernando Nicandro
  2. Eufemia Oliva
  3. Herminia Raizama
30. Abante Retirees Sectoral Party List Organization (Abante Retirees)
  1. Plaridel Abaya
  2. Raul Urgello
  3. Aravela Ramos
31. 1-Abilidad
  1. Puramayer Saquing
  2. Wanda Talosig
  3. Marichu Benavides
32. Katribu Indigenous Peoples Sectoral Party (Katribu)
  1. Beverly Longid
  2. Genasque Enriquez
  3. Norma Capuyan
33. Philippine Coconut Producers Federation (Cocofed)
  1. Emerito Calderon
  2. Charles Avila
34. Alab ng Mamamahayag (ALAM)
35. **Adhikaing Tinataguyod ng Kooperatiba (Ating Koop)**
  - First list:
    1. **Roberto Mascariña** (Note: Roberto Mascariña took office on May 23, 2016.)
    2. Amparo Rimas
    3. Lancelot Padla
  - Second list:
    1. Isidro Lico (incumbent)
    2. Gloria Futalan
    3. Ma. Socorro Calara
36. Association of Guard, Utility, Helper, Aider, Rider, Driver/Domestic Helper, Janitor, Agent, and Nanny of the Philippines (Guarjan)
37. Piston Land Transport Coalition (Piston)
  1. George San Mateo
  2. Edilberto Gonzaga
  3. Edgardo Salarda
38. **Agricultural Sector Alliance of the Philippines (AGAP)**
  1. **Nicanor Briones** (incumbent)
  2. **Rico Geron**
  3. Arnel Marasigan
39. **Agbiag! Timpuyog Ilocano (Agbiag)**
  1. **Patricio Antonio** (incumbent)
  2. Visitacion Ordoveza
  3. Jose Antonieto Antonio
40. Association of Laborers and Employees (ALE)
  1. Catalina Bagasina (incumbent)
  2. Ma. Michaela Magtoto
  3. Jane Castro
41. Abyan llonggo
42. Ang Prolife
  1. James Imbong
  2. Jeremy Benigno Gatdula
  3. Lorna Melegrito
43. **Alliance of Volunteer Educators (AVE)**
  1. **Eulogio Magsaysay** (incumbent)
  2. Jose Baesa
  3. Nicolas Braña
44. Partido ng mga Magsasaka para sa mga Magsasaka (Binhi)
  1. Ryan Vincent Uy
  2. Pacifico Rico Fajardo Jr.
  3. Nelson Villanueva
45. Alliance of Organizations, Networks and Associations of the Philippines (ALONA)
46. Ating Guro
  1. Benjo Basas
  2. Emilio Abelita III
  3. Armando Aquino
47. Partido ng Bayan ang Bida (PBB)
48. Association for Righteousness Advocacy in Leadership (ARAL)
  1. Maria Socorro Malitao
  2. Don Desiderio
  3. Oncenio Lacsamana
49. **Alliance of Concerned Teachers (ACT Teachers)**
  1. **Antonio Tinio** (incumbent)
  2. France Castro
  3. Mae Fe Ancheta-Templa
50. **Butil Farmers Party (Butil)**
  1. **Agapito Guanlao** (incumbent)
  2. Cecilla Leonora Chavez-Custodio
  3. Isidro Santos
51. **Cooperative NATCCO Network Party (Coop-NATCCO)**
  1. **Cresence Paez** (incumbent)
  2. **Anthony Bravo**
  3. Herminio Hernandez
52. Veterans Freedom Party (VFP)
  1. Estrella Santos
  2. Manuel Pamaran
  3. Joel Joseph Cabides
53. **Anti-Crime and Terrorism Community Involvement and Support (ACT-CIS)**
  1. Jerome Oliveros
  2. Maria Rosella Pagdilao
  3. Miguel Ortiz
54. **Gabriela Women's Party (Gabriela)**
  1. **Luzviminda Ilagan** (incumbent)
  2. **Emmi de Jesus** (incumbent)
  3. Lucia Francisco
55. 1-A Action Moral & Values Recovery Reform Philippines (1-AAMOVER)
  1. Abulkhayer Sambitory
  2. Emmanuel Carancho
  3. Romeo Valorozo
56. **Anak Mindanao (AMIN)**
  - First list:
    1. Amabella Carumba
    2. Acmad Macatimbol
    3. Anthony Cuyong
  - Second list:
    1. **Sitti Djalia Hataman**
    2. Rowaisa Pandapatan
    3. Alejandro Plariza
57. Ugnayan Ng Maralita Laban Sa Kahirapan (Umalab Ka)
  1. Maria Angela Esquivel
  2. Arnold Castro
  3. Edgardo Edwin Segaya
58. Alyansa ng OFW
  1. Abolcair Guro
  2. Jauhari Usman
  3. Nhazrudin Dianalan
59. **Abakada Guro (Abakada)**
  - First list:
    1. **Jonathan de la Cruz**
    2. Alexander Lopez
    3. Rodolfo Tor
  - Second list:
    1. Artemio Tuquero
    2. Lope Feble
    3. Pedro Dabu Jr.
60. **You Against Corruption and Poverty (YACAP)**
  1. **Carol Jane Lopez**
  2. Benhur Lopez Jr.
  3. Sheila Mae Ruelo
61. Action Brotherhood for Active Dreamers (Abroad)
  1. Danilo Dy
  2. Michelle Mabag
  3. Diana Rose Delgado
62. Katipunan ng mga Anak ng Bayan All Filipino Democratic Movement (Kaakbay)
  1. Leonor Briones
  2. Alain Pascua
  3. Rene Lopez
63. Pilipinas para sa Pinoy (PPP)
64. Aagapay sa Matatanda (AMA)
  1. Ricardo Agapito
  2. Feliciano Rosete
  3. Juan Roldan
65. Association Of Marine Officer & Ratings (AMOR Seaman)
  1. Christopher Maambong
  2. Victor Alviola
  3. Cresenciano Elaba Jr.
66. **Ang National Coalition Of Indigenous Peoples Action Na (ANAC-IP)**
  1. **Jose Panganiban Jr.**
  2. Rizalino Segundo
  3. Nicole Pauline Dy
67. **Angkla: Ang Partido Ng Mga Pilipinong Marino (Angkla)**
  1. **Jesulito Manalo**
  2. Ronaldo Enrile
  3. Juan Miguel Manalo
68. Atong Paglaum
  1. Rodolfo Pancrudo
  2. Pablo Lorenzo IIII
  3. Melchor Maramara
69. 1-Alliance Advocating Autonomy Party (1AAAP)
70. Alyansang Bayanihan ng mga Magsasaka, Manggagawang Bukid at Mangingisda (ABA)
  1. Leonardo Montemayor
  2. Antonio Reyes
  3. Baltazar Sator
71. **Ang Asosasyon sang Mangunguma nga Bisaya-Owa Mangunguma (AAMBIS-Owa)**
  1. **Sharon Garin** (incumbent)
  2. Geraldine Arnaiz
  3. James Garin
72. Isang Alyansang Aalalay Sa Pinoy Skilled Workers (1-Aalalay)
  1. Darryl Toledo
  2. Michael Mendoza
  3. Reynaldo de Leon
73. Abante Katutubo (Abante Ka)
  1. Hermenegildo Dumlao
  2. Jose Lopez
  3. Teodorico Calica
74. **1 Banat & Ahapo Party-List Coalition (1-BAP)**
  1. **Silvestre Bello III**
  2. Salvador Britanico
  3. Jimmy de Castro
75. The True Marcos Loyalist For God, Country and People Association of the Philippines (Bantay)
  1. Maria Evangelina Palparan
  2. Joshua Encabo
  3. Rubylyn Echon
76. 1 Bro-Philippine Guardians Brotherhood (1 BRO-PGBI)
  1. Ronjie Daquigan
  2. George Duldulao
  3. Bernard Rommel Vargas
77. Alliance For Philippines Security Guards Cooperative (AFPSEGCO)
  1. Sotero Leonoro Jr.
  2. Ronnie Inacay
  3. Nilo Duka
78. Agapay ng Indigenous Peoples Rights Alliance (A-IPRA)
  1. Reynaldo Lopez
  2. Ronald Flores
  3. Noel de Luna
79. **Bayan Muna**
  1. **Neri Colmenares** (incumbent)
  2. **Carlos Isagani Zarate**
  3. Hope Hervilla
80. Kalikasan Party-list (Kalikasan)
81. Mamamayan Tungo sa Maunlad na Pilipinas (MTM PHILS)
  1. Renato Uy
  2. Joseph Entero
  3. Datu Abdelnasser Sultan Esmael
82. Kasangga sa Kaunlaran (Ang Kasangga)
  1. Gwendolyn Pimentel
  2. Rene Villa Jr.
  3. Jose Ciceron Lorenzo Haresco
83. Akbay Kalusugan (AKIN)
84. **LPG Marketers Association (LPGMA)**
  1. **Arnel Ty** (incumbent)
  2. Miguel Ponce Jr.
  3. Jose Cruz III
85. Sectoral Party of ang Minero (Ang Minero)
  1. Luis Sarmiento
  2. Horacio Ramos
  3. Patrick Caoile
86. Kasosyo Producer-Consumer Exchange Association (AA-Kasosyo)
  1. Nasser Pangandaman (incumbent)
  2. Raynor Taroy
  3. Renato Alano
87. Una ang Pamilya (1 Ang Pamilya)
  1. Romeo Prestoza
  2. Baltazar Asadon
  3. Reena Concepcion Obillo (incumbent)
88. 1st Kabalikat ng Bayan Ginhawang Sangkatauhan (1st Kabagis)
  1. Michael Antonio Magsaysay
  2. Paul Vincent Tan
  3. Reynaldo Corsino
89. 1-United Transport Koalisyon (1-UTAK)
  1. Vigor Ma. Mendoza III
  2. Orlando Marquez
  3. Marieto Garvida
90. **Democratic Independent Workers Association (DIWA)**
  1. **Emmeline Aglipay** (incumbent)
  2. Ramon Bergado
  3. Pepito Pico
91. Alliance for Rural Concerns (ARC)
  1. Alan Paje
  2. Leonardo Odoño
  3. Saudi Sapanta
92. **Citizens' Battle Against Corruption (CIBAC)**
  - First list:
    1. Luis Lokin Jr.
    2. Bibiano Rivera Jr.
    3. Antonio Manahan Jr.
  - Second list:
    1. **Sherwin Tugna** (incumbent)
    2. **Cinchona Cruz-Gonzales** (incumbent)
    3. Armi Jane Borje
93. Agila ng Katutubong Pilipino (AGILA)
  1. Gil Valera
  2. Jocelyn Lebanan
  3. Elorde Valera
94. 1 Guardians Nationalist of the Philippines (1Ganap/Guardians)
  1. Ponciano Mapuyan
  2. Leonardo Lizaso
  3. Edward Baldonado
95. Alyansa ng mga Grupong Haligi ng Agham at Teknolohiya para sa Mamamayan (AGHAM)
  1. Angelo Palmones (incumbent)
  2. Florentino Tesoro
  3. Ruby Ephraim Rubiano
96. Migrante Sectoral Party of Overseas Filipinos and Their Families (Migrante)
  1. Concepcion Regalado
  2. Garry Martinez
  3. Emmanuel Villanueva
97. Anti-War/Anti-Terror Mindanao Peace Movement (Awat Mindanao)
  1. Jose Agduma II
  2. Christy Joy Arellano
  3. Jose Neodino del Corro
98. Alyansa Lumad Mindanao (Allumad)
  1. Julius Mabandos
  2. Arthur Alvendia
  3. Evangelisto Morada Jr.
99. Abante Tribung Makabansa (ATM)
  1. Allen Capuyan
  2. Reuben Dasay Lingating
  3. Nouh Daiman
100. Pilipino Association for Country-Urban Poor Youth Advancement and Welfare (Pacyaw)
  1. Rene Velarde
  2. Wilfrido Villarama
  3. Antonio Calanoc
101. Manila Teachers Savings and Loan Association (Manila Teachers)
102. Association of Local Athletics Entrepreneurs and Hobbyists (ALA-EH)
103. Kababaihang Lingkod Bayan Sa Pilipinas (KLBP)
  1. Maria Carmen Lazaro
  2. Mercidita Calingasan
  3. Thelma Bustonera
104. Ating Agapay Sentrong Samahan ng mga Obrero (Aasenso)
  1. Teodoro Montoro
  2. Robert Ganzon
  3. Samuel Bumangil
105. Ang Galing Pinoy (AG)
  1. Eder Dizon
  2. Jerold Dominick David
  3. Ryan Caladiao
106. Alagad
  1. Diogenes Osabel
  2. Hermenegildo Encierto Jr.
  3. Renato Navata
107. Blessed Federation of Farmers and Fishermen International (A Blessed)
  1. Expedito Lorente
  2. Tapa Umal
  3. Jim Garen
108. **Ang Mata'y Alagaan (AMA)**
  1. **Lorna Velasco**
  2. Tricia Nicole Velasco-Catera
  3. Vincent Michael Velasco
109. Akap Bata Sectoral Organization For Children (Akap Bata)
  1. Arlene Brosas
  2. Edgardo Clemente
  3. Evangeline Castronuevo-Ruga
110. Social Movement For Active Reform And Transparency (SMART)
  1. Carlito Cubelo
  2. Joseph Cubelo
  3. Marcelino Vergel de Dios
111. Alliance of Bicolnon Party (ABP)
  1. Enrique Olonan
  2. Neil Vargas
  3. Efren Lumbera
112. Alliance for Nationalism and Democracy (ANAD)
  1. Pastor Alcover (incumbent)
  2. Baltaire Balangauan
  3. Pedro Leslie Salva
113. Agrarian Development Association (ADA)
  1. Eric Singson
  2. Eric Singson Jr.
  3. Rodolfo Salanga
114. Alliance for Rural and Agrarian Reconstruction (ARARO)
  1. Quirino de la Torre
  2. Joel Obar
  3. Jose Gamos
115. Kaagapay ng Nagkaisang Agilang Pilipinong Magsasaka (KAP)
  1. Jacob Maganduga
  2. Paterno Clapis Jr.
  3. Liezl Repatacodo
116. Association of Philippine Electric Cooperatives (APEC)
  1. Rolando Reinoso
  2. Andres Garcia
  3. John Peter Millan
117. **Akbayan Citizens' Action Party (Akbayan)**
  1. **Walden Bello** (incumbent)
  2. **Barry Gutierrez**
  3. Angelina Ludovice-Katoh
118. **Social Amelioration & Genuine Intervention on Poverty (1-SAGIP)**
  1. **Erlinda Santiago**
  2. Edgardo Madamba
  3. Camilo Bacha
119. 1 Joint Alliance of Marginalized Group (1JAMG)
  1. Romero Mercado
  2. Shiela Marie Fernandez
  3. Julian Eugene Chipeco
120. Adhikain at Kilusan ng Ordinaryong Tao para sa Lupa, Pabahay, Hanapbuhay at Kaunlaran (Ako Bahay)
  1. Percival Chavez
  2. Jose Conrado Barker Sabio
  3. Apolonia Tolentino
121. Adhikain ng mga Dakilang Anak Maharlika (ADAM)
  1. Al-Makram Arbison
  2. Kadirie Sahali
  3. Abdulbasar Abdula
122. Ako Ayoko sa Bawal na Droga (AKO)
  1. Ma. Corazon Sarmiento
  2. Rodolfo Caisip
  3. Francis Rico Javier
123. **Abante Mindanao (Abamin)**
  1. **Maximo Rodriguez Jr.** (incumbent)
  2. Virginia Sering
  3. Irenetta Montinola
124. **Append**
  1. **Pablo Nava III**
  2. Eduardo Jimenez
  3. Raineer Chu
125. **Agri-Agra na Reforma para sa Magsasaka ng Pilipinas Movement (AGRI)** (Note: Delphine Gan Lee assumed office as the AGRI Partylist's representative.)
  1. Michael Ryan Enriquez
  2. Janice Cruz
  3. Mindalisa Takeuchi
126. Aangat Tayo
  1. Daryl Grace Abayon (incumbent)
  2. Teddie Elson Rivera
  3. Patricia Mae Veloso
127. **Ang Nars**
  1. **Leah Paquiz**
  2. Lydia Palaypay
  3. Chris Sorongon
128. Green Force for the Environment Sons and Daughters of Mother Earth (Green Force)
  1. Ramon Ignacio
  2. Nino Ignacio
  3. Freddie Feir
129. **Coalition of Association of Senior Citizens in the Philippines (Senior Citizens)** (Note: The seats won by the Senior Citizens Partylist were left vacant as none of the nominees in the two lists submitted by the party-list assumed office.)
  - First list:
    1. Francisco Datol
    2. Amelia Olegario
    3. Efren Santos
  - Second list:
    1. Godofredo Arquiza (incumbent)
    2. Milagros Magsaysay
    3. David Kho (incumbent)
130. Ang Laban ng Indiginong Filipino (ALIF)
  1. Abdul Tomawis
  2. Agakhan Tomawis
  3. Raima Cali
131. **Kalinga-Advocacy for Social Empowerment And Nation-Building Through Easing Poverty (Kalinga)**
  1. **Abigail Faye Ferriol** (incumbent)
  2. Irene Gay Saulog
  3. Uzziel Caponpon
132. **Anakpawis**
  1. **Fernando Hicap**
  2. Joel Maglunsod
  3. Randall Echanis
133. Isang Pangarap ng Bahay sa Bagong Buhay ng Maralitang Kababayan (1-Pabahay)
  1. Nereo Joaquin Jr.
  2. Juveley Panganiban
  3. Kenway Tan
134. Kapatiran ng mga Nakulong na Walang Sala (Kakusa)
  1. Ma. Jesusa Sespeñe
  2. Romeo Jalosjos Jr.
  3. Cipriano Robielos III
135. **Buhay Hayaan Yumabong (Buhay)**
  1. **Mariano Michael Velarde Jr.** (incumbent)
  2. **Lito Atienza**
  3. **Irwin Tieng** (incumbent)
136. **Abang Lingkod**
  1. **Stephen Paduano**
  2. Patrick Leonard Lacson
  3. William Saratobias
