= Milagros Magsaysay =

Filipino politician (born 1946)

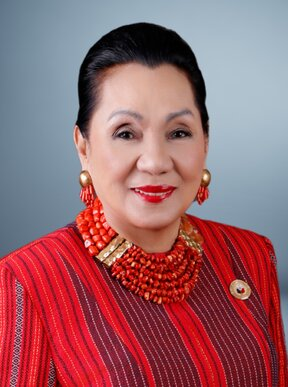
- Official portrait, 2025

Member of the Philippine House of Representatives for United Senior Citizens Partylist
- Incumbent
- Assumed office November 7, 2022

Member of the Philippine House of Representatives for Senior Citizens Partylist
- In office June 30, 2016 – June 30, 2019 Serving with Francisco Datol

Personal details
- Born: Milagros Gaerlan Aquino; November 27, 1946 (age 79) San Juan, La Union, Philippines
- Spouse: Raymond Magsaysay (deceased)

Milagros Gaerlan Aquino-Magsaysay (born November 27, 1946) is a Filipino politician who currently serves as the representative of the United Senior Citizens Partylist to the House of Representatives of the Philippines, a position she has held since 2022. She was also a former representative of the Senior Citizens Partylist, a different organization, from 2017 to 2019.

== Early life ==
Magsaysay was born on November 27, 1946, in San Juan, La Union.

== Career ==
=== Senior Citizens ===
Magsaysay was formerly part of the Senior Citizens Partylist. The organization won two seats in the 2013 election. However the party underwent a leadership dispute with Magsaysay being part of Godofredo Arquiza's faction in opposition to Francisco Datol's. The Commission on Elections proposed Arquiza and Datol to be proclaimed as winners with their respective second nominees (Magsaysay and Amelia Olegario) conceding their seats. The Arquiza faction refused. The seat was never filled during the 16th Congress.

For the 2016 election, with the backing of the commission, Datol and Magsaysay agreed to become the 1st and 2nd nominees, respectively. Arquiza established his own "Coalition of Seniors and the Elderly" party. The party ran, won, and was proclaimed winner of two seats in the 2016 election. Datol and Magsaysay were seated in the 17th Congress in 2017.

For the May 2019 election, Senior Citizens submitted three lists of nominees, with each list headed by one of the faction heads, Datol, Arquiza and Magsaysay herself. Datol was eventually proclaimed the Senior Citizen's representative for the 18th Congress.

=== United Senior Citizens ===
Magsaysay left Senior Citizens to run under the United Senior Citizens Partylist for the 2022 election. Her party's accreditation was disputed causing her oath-taking to be delayed to November 7, 2022. She has promoted the institution of a universal pension program.

== Personal life ==
She is a widow who was formerly married to Raymond Magsaysay.
