= COVID-19 pandemic in the Bicol Region =

Ongoing COVID-19 viral pandemic in the Bicol Region, the Philippines

- Disease: COVID-19
- Pathogen: SARS-CoV-2
- Location: Bicol Region
- First outbreak: Wuhan, Hubei, China
- Index case: Legazpi, Albay
- Arrival date: March 27, 2020 (6 years, 1 month and 3 weeks)
- Confirmed cases: 14,671
- Recovered: 12,917
- Deaths: 279

Government website
- ro5.doh.gov.ph

The COVID-19 pandemic in the Bicol Region is part of the worldwide pandemic of coronavirus disease 2019 (COVID-19) caused by severe acute respiratory syndrome coronavirus 2 (SARS-CoV-2). The virus reached the Bicol Region on March 27, 2020, when the first case of the disease was confirmed in Albay.

== Timeline ==
The Department of Health (DOH) announced the first three cases in the Bicol Region on March 27. The cases were that of two male patients (50 and 53 years old) confined at the Bicol Regional Training and Teaching Hospital in Daraga, Albay and a 48-year-old female from Naga, Camarines Sur. From March 28 to April 1, the DOH reported four more cases, totaling seven cases.

Catanduanes recorded its first case on April 19, that 63-year-old woman from Virac. The patient who also had a travel history to Japan was admitted at the Eastern Bicol Medical Center from March 12 to 18. The woman arrived in the province on March 7 prior to the imposition of the Luzon enhanced community quarantine.

The Luzon enhanced community quarantine was partially lifted, downgrading the whole Bicol Region to general community quarantine status starting May 1. However, enhanced community quarantine was reimposed on Albay province the following day.

The first recorded case of Camarines Norte was announced on May 11. The case was that of a resident of Labo who first experienced symptoms on April 27 and went to the Camarines Norte Provincial Hospital on May 4 for consultation. Three days later the first confirmed case in Sorsogon was announced, that of a seafarer who arrived from Florida in the United States.

Masbate recorded its first two cases on June 27, that of a man coming from Taguig in Metro Manila, and a 1-year old baby from Naga, Camarines Sur.

== Statistics ==
Cumulative COVID-19 cases in Bicol based on numbers confirmed and validated by the DOH CHD – Bicol Updated October 16, 2020
Province/City	Cases	Deaths	Recov.	Active
Albay	372	28	317	26
Camarines Norte	89	3	56	30
Camarines Sur	522	20	380	124
Catanduanes	100	2	89	9
Masbate	143	1	129	13
Sorsogon	223	12	160	51
Legazpi City	336	15	298	23
Naga City	416	15	347	48
Others*	3	0	1	2
Total	▲2,204	▲96	▲1,782	▲326

Others*: Residents from Quezon Province

== Response ==
The Bicol Regional Diagnostic and Reference Laboratory (BRDRL) in Legazpi tests suspected COVID-19 cases in the region which had the capacity to conduct 40 to 60 test daily initially. On June 5, the facility was upgraded so it could conduct 500 tests daily.
