= United Senior Citizens Partylist =

United Senior Citizens
- — Philippine partylist —
- Full name: United Senior Citizens Koalition ng Pilipinas, Inc.
- Sector(s) represented: Senior citizens
- COMELEC accreditation: 2018; 7 years ago

Current representation (19th Congress)
- Seats in the House of Representatives: 1 / 3 (Out of 63 party-list seats)
- Representative(s): Milagros Magsaysay

The United Senior Citizens Koalition ng Pilipinas, Inc., commonly known as United Senior Citizens Partylist, is a political organization in the Philippines representing the interests of the elderly, otherwise known as senior citizens in the Philippines.

== Background ==
United Senior Citizens states their establishment year to be 2018.

United Senior Citizens vied for a seat in the Philippine House of Representatives in the 2022 elections. They won a seat, but their accreditation as a partylist organization under the Commission on Elections (COMELEC) was disputed. Consequentially, United Seniors was not among the partylist proclaimed as winners on May 26. On November 7, Milagros Magsaysay, a former representative of Senior Citizens Partylist in the 17th Congress took oath.

They ran again for the 2025 election.

== Political positions ==
They advocate the creation of a nationwide unified senior citizens identity card to mitigate the proliferation of fake IDs. The organization also wants a universal social pension which will cover all eldery people and not just indigents.

== Electoral results ==
Election	Votes	%	Secured Seats	Party-List Seats	Congress	1st Representative	2nd Representative	3rd Representative	Ref.
2022	320,627	0.87%	1 / 3	63	19th Congress; 2022–2025	Milagros Magsaysay	—	—	
Note: A party-list representation in the House of Representatives of the Philippines, can win a maximum of three seats in the House of Representatives.
