= Rodolfo Ordanes =

Filipino politician and Senior Citizens Party-list representative (born 1952)

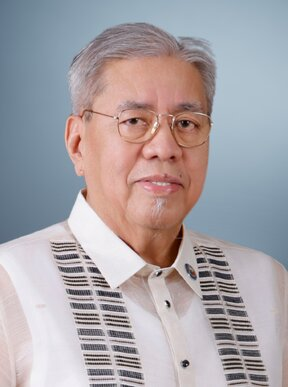
- Official portrait, 2025

Member of the Philippine House of Representatives for Senior Citizens Partylist
- Incumbent
- Assumed office October 13, 2020
- Preceded by: Francisco Datol

Personal details
- Born: Rodolfo Epimaco Malicse Ordanes; December 12, 1952 (age 73)
- Spouse: Erlinda A. Ordanes
- Education: Cabanatuan City Colleges (BS Commerce); Zaragosa College (MEd)
- Occupation: Politician; Public administrator

Rodolfo Epimaco "Ompong" Malicse Ordanes (born December 12, 1952) is a Filipino politician serving as representative of the Senior Citizens Partylist in the House of Representatives of the Philippines since 2020.

== Early life and education ==
Rodolfo Epimaco Malicse Ordanes was born on December 12, 1952. He attended the Aliaga Provincial High School before finishing his accounting degree at the Cabanatuan City Colleges. He took up a master's degree in education at the Zaragosa College.

== Career ==
=== Government service ===
Before entering national politics, Ordanes worked as an assessor for the Quezon City local government and as an appraiser for the Parañaque city government.

=== Political career ===
Ordanes succeeded Francisco Datol, who died while in office, as the representative of Senior Citizens Partylist on October 13, 2025.

== Personal life ==
Ordanes is married Erlinda A. Ordanes.
