= Senior Citizens Partylist =

Political party in the Philippines

Senior Citizens
- — Philippine partylist —
- Full name: Coalition of Associations of Senior Citizens in the Philippines, Inc.
- Sector(s) represented: Senior citizens
- Founded: 2003; 23 years ago
- COMELEC accreditation: 2007; 19 years ago
- Headquarters: Quezon City, Metro Manila

Current representation (19th Congress)
- Seats in the House of Representatives: 1 / 3 (Out of 63 party-list seats)
- Representative(s): Rodolfo Ordanes

Coalition of Associations of Senior Citizens in the Philippines, Inc., commonly known as Senior Citizens Partylist, is a political party in the Philippines representing the interests of the elderly, otherwise known as senior citizens in the Philippines. It has run and won seats in the party-list elections. It has been plagued by party infighting, which has led to delay in its nominees taking their seats in the House of Representatives.

== History ==
=== 2007 ===
The Coalition of Associations of Senior Citizens in the Philippines, which was established in 2003, was accredited as a partylist by the Commission on Elections on March 16, 2007. Senior Citizens Partylist initially did not win a seat in 2007. However, due to the 2009 BANAT vs. COMELEC decision of the Supreme Court, they were awarded one seat.

=== 2010 ===
The party finished second in the national party-list vote, winning two seats in the House of Representatives. After its two nominees were seated, one of them, David Kho, offered to resign to let the 4th nominee, Remedios Arquiza, take his seat. The Commission on Elections, prohibiting term-sharing unless a nominee dies, disallowed it.

In the 15th Congress, the party was able to pass the law requiring that senior citizens have their own polling precincts.

=== 2013 ===
In the 2013 election, the party was disqualified by the Commission on Elections, after the Supreme Court ruled that the party-list election no longer be restricted to marginalized groups. The party was still included in the ballot, as they were disqualified after the ballots were printed. The party finished with more than 2% of the vote, and would have won seats if it was not disqualified. The Supreme Court later ordered the commission to proclaim the party winners in the election. The commission was not able to proclaim the party as winners, however, since there were two sets of lists of nominees submitted by the party. One list had Godofredo Arquiza and Milagros Magsaysay as its top two nominees, while the other had Francisco Datol Jr. and Amelia Olegario. By 2014, the party sought relief from the Supreme Court as they still were not able to take their seats. The commission offered a compromise whereby Arquiza and Datol were to be seated, but both nominees refused.

By the time the 2016 election was held, no nominees from the party had been seated in the 16th Congress.

=== 2016 ===
For the 2016 election, with the backing of the commission, Datol and Magsaysay agreed to become the 1st and 2nd nominees, respectively. Arquiza established his own "Coalition of Seniors and the Elderly" party. The party ran, won, and was proclaimed winner of two seats in the 2016 election. Datol and Magsaysay were seated in the 17th Congress.

=== 2019 ===
For the May 2019 election, the party submitted three lists of nominees, with each list headed by one of the faction heads, Datol, Magsaysay, and Arquiza. Arquiza argued that his set of nominees was legal, as he was the #1 nominee since 2007. The party had a stalemate for their 1 seat in Congress. On July 22, Congress convened for the first time. By late November, after the 18th Congress had convened, its leaders asked the Commission on Elections to release the Certificates of Proclamations to Senior Citizens and Duterte Youth. Both parties had unresolved internal disputes, with Senior Citizens still unable to declare their first nominee. By December 4, over five months since Congress first convened, Majority Leader Martin Romualdez announced that they had received a Certificate of Proclamation for Datol, who was sworn in on the same day.

On August 10, 2020, Datol died due to complications from COVID-19. Rodolfo Ordanes replaced him on October 13, 2020.

=== 2022 ===
Senior Citizens won one seat in the 2022 party-list election, with Ordanes defending the seat. Magsaysay ran under the United Senior Citizens Partylist and also won a seat under her party.

=== 2025 ===
Senior Citizens successfully defended its seat in 2025.

== Electoral performance ==
Election	Votes	%	Seats
2007	213,095	1.33%	1
2010	1,296,950	4.42%	2
2013	679,168	2.46%	0
2016	988,876	3.05%	2
2019	516,927	1.85%	1
2022	614,671	1.67%	1
2025	577,753	1.38%	1

== Representatives to Congress ==
Period	1st representative	2nd representative
14th Congress; 2007–2010	Godofredo Arquiza	—N/a
15th Congress; 2010–2013	Godofredo Arquiza	David Kho
16th Congress; 2013–2016	Out of congress	
17th Congress; 2016–2019	Francisco Datol	Milagros Magsaysay
18th Congress; 2019–2022	Francisco Datol (Note: Died in office.); Rodolfo Ordanes	—N/a
19th Congress; 2022–2025	Rodolfo Ordanes	—N/a
20th Congress; 2025–present	Rodolfo Ordanes	—N/a
Note: A party-list group, can win a maximum of three seats in the House of Representatives.
