= Francisco Datol =

Filipino politician (1948-2020)

Member of the Philippine House of Representatives for Senior Citizens Partylist
- In office June 30, 2016 – June 30, 2019 Serving with Milagros Magsaysay
- Preceded by: Godofredo Arquiza
- In office December 4, 2019 – August 10, 2020
- Succeeded by: Rodolfo Ordanes

Personal details
- Born: Francisco G. Datol Jr. December 29, 1948
- Died: August 10, 2020 (aged 71)

Francisco "Jun" Gamboa Datol Jr. (December 29, 1948 – August 10, 2020) was a Filipino politician who served as a representative for the Senior Citizens Partylist in the House of Representatives.

== Career ==
=== Leadership dispute (2010–13) ===
The Senior Citizens Partylist took part at the 2010 election winning two seats which was filled by Godofredo Arquiza and David Kho as first and second nominee respectively. There was allegedly a term-sharing agreement where Kho would give way after one and a half year with Francisco Datol, the third nominee succeeding Kho. However a leadership dispute arose after the Datol was removed from the group with Remedios Arquiza being the next in line as the fourth nominee if Kho was to resign. The Aquiza and Datol factions also had two separate nominee list for the 2013 election.

=== Senior Citizens Partylist representative (2016–20) ===
Datol became a representative for Senior Citizens after the 2016 election, with the group securing enough votes for two seat. He served alongside Milagros Aquino Magsaysay.

Senior Citizens retained a seat after the conclusion of the 2019 election but the seat was initially left vacant. However the group experienced a leadership dispute with Datol, Datol, Magsaysay, and Godofredo Villar Arquiza claiming to be party president and have submitted different list of nominees to the Commission on Elections. Datol was proclaimed as the party's first nominee by the election body and Datol took oath as Senior Citizens' representative on December 4, 2019.

Datol voted to reject the renewal of the then-recently expiring franchise of broadcast giant ABS-CBN Corporation. Datol filed the law which created the National Commission of Senior Citizens. He also promoted the Universal Pension bill and sought to amend the Centenarian Act. He was chairman of the house committee on senior citizens.

== Illness and death ==
Datol was diabetic. He died in office on August 10, 2020 at age 71 from acute respiratory distress due to COVID-19 during a pandemic of the disease.
