= Philippine House Committee on Public Order and Safety =

Standing committee of the House of Representatives of the Philippines

Committee on Public Order and Safety
- 20th Congress

History
- New session started: To convene on July 28, 2025

Leadership
- Chairman: Vacant
- Minority Leader: Vacant

Website
- Committee on Public Order and Safety

The Philippine House Committee on Public Order and Safety, or House Public Order and Safety Committee is a standing committee of the Philippine House of Representatives.

== Jurisdiction ==
As prescribed by House Rules, the committee's jurisdiction is on the suppression of criminality which includes the following:

- Bureau of Fire Protection
- Bureau of Jail Management and Penology
- Philippine National Police and private security agencies
- Civil defense
- Firecrackers and pyrotechnics
- Illegal gambling
- Organized crime and illegal drugs
- Private armies
- Regulation of firearms
- Terrorism

== Members, 20th Congress ==
As of June 30, 2025, all committee membership positions are vacant until the House convenes for its first regular session on July 28.

== Historical membership rosters ==
=== 19th Congress ===
| Position | Members | Party | Province/City | District |
|---|---|---|---|---|
| Chairperson | Danilo Fernandez | NUP | Santa Rosa | At-large |
| Vice Chairpersons | Romeo Acop | NUP | Antipolo | 2nd |
| Vice Chairpersons | Reynante U. Arrogancia | Reporma | Quezon | 3rd |
| Vice Chairpersons | Menchie "Ching" Bernos | Lakas | Abra | At-large |
| Vice Chairpersons | Emerson D. Pascual | Lakas | Nueva Ecija | 4th |
| Vice Chairpersons | Adolph Edward "Eddiebong" Plaza | NUP | Bulacan | 6th |
| Vice Chairpersons | Celso G. Regencia | Lakas | Iligan | At-large |
| Vice Chairpersons | Ysabel Maria "Bel" Zamora | Lakas | San Juan | At-large |
| Members for the Majority | Robert Ace Barbers | Nacionalista | Surigao del Norte | 2nd |
| Members for the Majority | Benny Abante | NUP | Manila | 6th |
| Members for the Majority | Loreto Acharon | NPC | General Santos | At-large |
| Members for the Majority | Jude Acidre | Tingog | Party-list | |
| Members for the Majority | Zia Alonto Adiong | Lakas | Lanao del Sur | 1st |
| Members for the Majority | Cheeno Miguel D. Almario | Lakas | Davao Oriental | 2nd |
| Members for the Majority | Jose "Joboy" Aquino II | Lakas | Agusan del Norte | 1st |
| Members for the Majority | Julienne Baronda | Lakas | Iloilo City | At-large |
| Members for the Majority | Claudine Bautista-Lim | DUMPER | Party-list | |
| Members for the Majority | Jil Bongalon | Ako Bicol | Party-list | |
| Members for the Majority | Nicanor Briones | AGAP | Party-list | |
| Members for the Majority | Jorge Antonio Bustos | Patrol | Party-list | |
| Members for the Majority | John Tracy Cagas | Nacionalista | Davao del Sur | At-large |
| Members for the Majority | Drixie Mae Suarez Cardema | Duterte Youth | Party-list | |
| Members for the Majority | Jane Castro | Lakas | Capiz | 2nd |
| Members for the Majority | Joel Chua | Lakas | Manila | 3rd |
| Members for the Majority | Ambrosio C. Cruz Jr. | Lakas | Bulacan | 5th |
| Members for the Majority | Alfred delos Santos | Ang Probinsyano | Party-list | |
| Members for the Majority | Ernix Dionisio | Lakas | Manila | 1st |
| Members for the Majority | Faustino Michael Carlos T. Dy III | Lakas | Isabela | 5th |
| Members for the Majority | Yevgeny Emano | Nacionalista | Misamis Oriental | 2nd |
| Members for the Majority | Jonathan Keith Flores | Lakas | Bukidnon | 2nd |
| Members for the Majority | Arnulf Bryan Fuentebella | NPC | Camarines Sur | 4th |
| Members for the Majority | Ruwel Peter S. Gonzaga | PFP | Davao de Oro | 2nd |
| Members for the Majority | Wilton "Tonton" T. Kho | Lakas | Masbate | 3rd |
| Members for the Majority | Jefferson F. Khonghun | Nacionalista | Zambales | 1st |
| Members for the Majority | Gerville "Jinky Bitrics" Luistro | Lakas | Batangas | 2nd |
| Members for the Majority | Alfredo D. Marañon III | NUP | Negros Occidental | 2nd |
| Members for the Majority | Francisco Jose "Bingo" Matugas II | Lakas–CMD | Surigao del Norte | 1st |
| Members for the Majority | Sancho Fernando F. Oaminal | Lakas | Misamis Occidental | 2nd |
| Members for the Majority | Khymer Adan T. Olaso | Nacionalista | Zamboanga City | 1st |
| Members for the Majority | Johnny Pimentel | NUP | Surigao del Sur | 2nd |
| Members for the Majority | Salvador Pleyto | Lakas | Bukidnon | 2nd |
| Members for the Majority | Eduardo R. Rama Jr. | Lakas | Cebu City | 2nd |
| Members for the Majority | Jurdin Jesus Romualdo | Lakas | Camiguin | At-large |
| Members for the Majority | Princess Rihan M. Sakaluran | Lakas | Sultan Kudarat | 1st |
| Members for the Majority | Horacio P. Suansing Jr. | NUP | Sultan Kudarat | 2nd |
| Members for the Majority | Mikaela Angela "Mika" Suansing | Lakas | Nueva Ecija | 1st |
| Members for the Majority | Samier A. Tan | Lakas | Sulu | 1st |
| Members for the Majority | Toby Tiangco | Navoteño | Navotas | At-large |
| Members for the Majority | Allan U. Ty | LPGMA | Party-list | |
| Members for the Majority | Patrick Michael D. Vargas | Lakas | Quezon City | 5th |
| Members for the Majority | Brian Yamsuan | Bicol Saro | Party-list | |
| Members for the Majority | Pammy Zamora | Lakas | Taguig | 2nd |
| Members for the Minority | Stephen Paduano | Abang Lingkod | Party-list | |
| Members for the Minority | Bonifacio Bosita | 1-Rider | Party-list | |
| Members for the Minority | Sergio Dagooc | APEC | Party-list | |
| Members for the Minority | Rodge Gutierrez | 1-Rider | Party-list | |
| Members for the Minority | Raoul Manuel | Kabataan | Party-list | |
| Members for the Minority | Jose Gay Padiernos | GP | Party-list | |

=== 18th Congress ===
| Position | Members | Party | Province/City | District |
|---|---|---|---|---|
| Chairperson | Narciso Bravo Jr. | NUP | Masbate | 1st |
| Vice Chairpersons | Frederick Siao | Nacionalista | Iligan | Lone |
| Vice Chairpersons | Adolph Edward Plaza | NUP | Agusan del Sur | 2nd |
| Vice Chairpersons | Samier Tan | PDP–Laban | Sulu | 1st |
| Vice Chairpersons | Jorge Antonio Bustos | PATROL | Party-list | |
| Vice Chairpersons | Michael Edgar Aglipay | DIWA | Party-list | |
| Members for the Majority | Rolando M. Valeriano | NUP | Manila | 2nd |
| Members for the Majority | Rozzano Rufino Biazon | PDP–Laban | Muntinlupa | Lone |
| Members for the Majority | Diego Ty | NUP | Misamis Occidental | 1st |
| Members for the Majority | Romeo "Jon-jon" Jalosjos Jr. | Nacionalista | Zamboanga del Norte | 1st |
| Members for the Majority | Joseph Bernos | Nacionalista | Abra | Lone |
| Members for the Majority | Francisco Jose "Bingo" Matugas II | PDP–Laban | Surigao del Norte | 1st |
| Members for the Majority | Junie Cua | PDP–Laban | Quirino | Lone |
| Members for the Majority | Ruwel Peter Gonzaga | PDP–Laban | Davao de Oro | 2nd |
| Members for the Majority | Wilton Kho | PDP–Laban | Masbate | 3rd |
| Members for the Majority | Juan Fidel Felipe Nograles | Lakas | Rizal | 2nd |
| Members for the Majority | Maria Fe Abunda | PDP–Laban | Eastern Samar | Lone |
| Members for the Majority | Rogelio Pacquiao | PDP–Laban | Sarangani | Lone |
| Members for the Majority | Luisa Lloren Cuaresma | NUP | Nueva Vizcaya | Lone |
| Members for the Majority | Edgar Mary Sarmiento | NUP | Samar | 1st |
| Members for the Majority | Strike Revilla | NUP | Cavite | 2nd |
| Members for the Majority | Ruth Mariano-Hernandez | Independent | Laguna | 2nd |
| Members for the Majority | Horacio Suansing Jr. | NUP | Sultan Kudarat | 2nd |
| Members for the Majority | Wilfrido Mark Enverga | NPC | Quezon | 1st |
| Members for the Majority | Dahlia Loyola | NPC | Cavite | 5th |
| Members for the Majority | Erico Aristotle Aumentado | NPC | Bohol | 2nd |
| Members for the Majority | Manuel Jose Dalipe | NPC | Zamboanga City | 2nd |
| Members for the Majority | John Reynald Tiangco | Partido Navoteño | Navotas | Lone |
| Members for the Majority | Arnulf Bryan Fuentebella | NPC | Camarines Sur | 4th |
| Members for the Majority | Ma. Lourdes Acosta-Alba | Bukidnon Paglaum | Bukidnon | 1st |
| Members for the Majority | Princess Rihan Sakaluran | NUP | Sultan Kudarat | 1st |
| Members for the Majority | Adriano Ebcas | AKO PADAYON | Party-list | |
| Members for the Majority | Presley De Jesus | PHILRECA | Party-list | |
| Members for the Majority | Manuel Cabochan | MAGDALO | Party-list | |
| Members for the Majority | Roger Mercado | Lakas | Southern Leyte | Lone |
| Members for the Majority | Jose Teves Jr. | TGP | Party-list | |
| Members for the Majority | Robert Ace Barbers | Nacionalista | Surigao del Norte | 2nd |
| Members for the Majority | Cesar Jimenez Jr. | PDP–Laban | Zamboanga City | 1st |
| Members for the Majority | Ducielle Marie Cardema | Duterte Youth | Party-list | |
| Members for the Minority | Arnolfo Teves Jr. | PDP–Laban | Negros Oriental | 3rd |
| Members for the Minority | Lawrence Lemuel Fortun | Nacionalista | Agusan del Norte | 1st |
| Members for the Minority | Gabriel Bordado Jr. | Liberal | Camarines Sur | 3rd |

==== Members for the Majority ====
- Resurreccion Acop (Note: Died on May 28, 2021.) (Antipolo–2nd, NUP)

== See also ==
- House of Representatives of the Philippines
- List of Philippine House of Representatives committees
