= P3PWD =

Political party in the Philippines

- — Philippine partylist —
- Full name: Komunidad ng Pamilya Pasyente at Persons with Disabilities
- Sector(s) represented: Persons with disabilities and patients
- Headquarters: Quezon City, Metro Manila

Website
- p3pwdpartylist.org

The Komunidad ng Pamilya Pasyente at Persons with Disabilities (lit. 'Community of Families, Patients, and Persons with Disabilities'), also known as the P3PWD Party List, is a political organization seeking party-list representation in the House of Representatives of the Philippines.

== Background ==
The P3PWD Party List ran in the 2022 House of Representatives elections managing to secure a single seat. The party listed Grace Yaneza, Ira Paulo Pozon, Marianne Heidi Fullon, Peter Jonas David, and Lili Grace Tiangco as its official nominees while former Commission on Elections commissioner Rowena Guanzon was actively involved in the organization's campaigning. P3PWD aims to represent the interest of persons with disabilities (PWDs) and patients.

Guanzon announced herself as the presumptive representative for P3PWD, despite not being on the organization's official nominees list. At that time, the Commission on Elections stated that it has also not received any documents for substitution that would make Guanzon eligible to fill in P3PWD's seat.

On June 14, 2022, all five of the party's official nominees resigned, with three of the nominees citing personal reasons. The party submitted a certificate of nomination to the COMELEC that day, comprising Rowena Guanzon, Rosalie Garcia, Cherrie Belmonte-Lim, Donnabel Tenorio, and Rodolfo Villar Jr.

Acting COMELEC spokesperson Rex Laudiangco confirmed that the COMELEC has received their new certificate of nomination, stating that the "matter is subject to the deliberation of the Commission en banc".

On June 15, the COMELEC en banc allowed Guanzon to sit as the party's first nominee.

In 2024, the Supreme Court barred Guanzon from taking her congressional office by nullifying her nomination, citing grave abuse of discretion by COMELEC in approving her substitution past the designated deadline. The High Tribunal also declared null and void Rosalie J. Garcia, Cherie B. Belmonte-Lim, Donnabel C. Tenorio, and Rodolfo B. Villar's nominations.

=== Legal actions ===
On June 21, 2022, Duterte Youth party-list filed a petition asking the Supreme Court (SC) to prohibit Guanzon from taking a seat designated for the P3PWD party-list. The SC decided on June 29 to temporarily stop a COMELEC resolution allowing her substitution.

Prior to the decision from the SC, the COMELEC en banc denied Duterte Youth's complaint against the substitution of Guanzon.

Meanwhile, Guanzon, on June 21, filed libel and unjust vexation charges against Duterte Youth chairman and National Youth Commission chairman Ronald Cardema before the Quezon City Prosecution Office; and on June 28, filed a complaint against him before the Office of the Ombudsman, all regarding the latter's statements in connection to her substitution.

== Electoral performance ==
Election	Votes	%	Party-list seats
2022	391,174	1.06	1
2025	214,605	0.51	0

== Representatives to Congress ==
Period	Representative
19th Congress; 2022–2025	Maria Camille Ilagan (Never seated (Note: Proclaimed on 15 December 2024, after the Supreme Court invalidated the substitution of its previous first nominee Rowena Guanzon but has not been seated by the House of Representatives of the Philippines.))
