= Duterte Youth =

Former party-list in the Philippines that supported Rodrigo Duterte

- — Philippine partylist —
- Full name: Duty to Energize the Republic through the Enlightenment of the Youth Sectoral Party-list Organization (Note: Its full name is a backronym for the name Duterte: Duty to Energize the Republic through the Enlightenment of the Youth Sectoral Party-list Organization.)
- Chairperson: Ronald Cardema
- Sector(s) represented: Youth
- Founder: Ronald Cardema
- Founded: 2016; 10 years ago
- Delisted: October 1, 2025; 13 months ago
- Ideology: Dutertismo; Anti-communism; Right-wing populism
- Political position: Right-wing

The Duterte Youth, officially the Duty to Energize the Republic through the Enlightenment of the Youth Sectoral Party-list Organization, was a Filipino right-wing youth organization that supported former Philippine president Rodrigo Duterte and his political positions. It was founded in 2016 by Ronald Cardema, who served as its chairman. The Duterte Youth held seats in the House of Representatives of the Philippines from 2019 through the party-list system and was the subject of various controversies. Its party-list registration was cancelled on October 1, 2025.

== Name ==
Ronald Cardema acknowledged that his group had been likened to the Hitler Youth of the Nazis but emphasized that the German organization had existed "in a different generation, a different continent, in a different context". He argued that the Hitler Youth has no patent over its name, and it is not forbidden for a group to attach the word "youth" to a name of a president since "all countries have youth".

During their participation in the 2019 House of Representatives elections as a party-list, the group's official name was revealed as Duty to Energize the Republic through the Enlightenment of the Youth Sectoral Party-list Organization.

== History ==
The Duterte Youth was founded by Ronald Cardema in 2016 to support the presidential campaign of Rodrigo Duterte. As of 2016, Cardema was also the chairman of the Kabataan for Bongbong Movement, a youth organization supporting Bongbong Marcos.

Duterte Youth held their first rally on November 25, 2016, to counter the protests against the burial of former dictator Ferdinand Marcos at Libingan ng mga Bayani. The group expressed their support for President Duterte and the Supreme Court, who ordered and affirmed the burial, respectively. A self-reported figure of 20 to 50 people attended the rally. In December 2016, Cardema claimed that the Duterte Youth already had 600 members across the Philippines. In February 2017, the group announced their plan to recruit 1 million members aged 15 to 30 by recruiting 1,000 people in each municipality and 5,000 in each city.

In August 2017, Duterte appointed Cardema to the National Youth Commission (NYC) as commissioner representing Luzon. Upon Ice Seguerra's resignation as NYC chairperson in April 2018, Cardema became the Officer in Charge until Duterte formally appointed him as the new NYC chairperson in August 2018.

=== House of Representatives elections ===
The Duterte Youth made a successful bid to win at least a seat in the 2019 Philippine House of Representatives elections through party-list representation. Their five official nominees were as follows from 1st to 5th: (Ducielle Marie Suarez, Joseph de Guzman, Benilda de Guzman, Arnaldo Villafranca, and Elizabeth Anne Cardema). However, all five nominees withdrew and Duterte Youth leader Ronald Cardema who was also National Youth Commission chairman filed a substitution in a bid to fill in the seat himself. In relation to Cardema's bid, factors whether he filed substitution in time before polls closed on May 13 and whether he is qualified to represent the Duterte Youth in the House of Representatives were put into dispute.

Six of the seven members of the Comelec decided to give "due course" or deliberate further on Cardema's bid and four others accepted the withdrawal of Duterte Youth's five initial nominees. Only Election Commissioner Rowena Guanzon expressed dissent who argued that the three original nominees of ages 31 to 36, and also Cardema who is 34 years old, are not eligible to represent the party-list as a representative of the youth sector as per Section 9 of the Republic Act No. 7941 given that nominees should be aged 25 to 30 on election day. The commissioner also views the filing of the withdrawal of the original nominees at 5:30pm on May 12, 2019, a Sunday, as invalid since its contrary to Resolution No. 8665 which states that filing should be done on a regular working day during office hours. Cardema defended his eligibility insisting that the party while it represents the youth, also represents professionals in general as well.

Cardema's bid was criticized by Senator Panfilo Lacson who said that the Duterte Youth partylist and its leader "are one of the many reasons" that the party-list representation system has become a "joke".

In February 2025, election watchdog Kontra Daya flagged Duterte Youth as among the party list organizations that do not represent marginalized groups. Duterte Youth has military connections which accounts history of red-tagging activists, according to Kontra Daya.

=== Disqualification of Ronald Cardema ===
On August 5, 2019, the first division of the Commission on Elections (Philippines) (COMELEC) canceled his nomination as the party-list representative of Duterte Youth by a vote of 2–0. The decision was concurred by commissioners Rowena Guanzon and Marlon Casquejo, while Commissioner Al Parreño was away on official businesses. The cancellation stemmed from Cardema's claim that he was eligible for nomination on his Certificate of Acceptance and Nomination, which the COMELEC deemed "material misrepresentation" because of the 25- to 30-year-old age requirement as set out by the Party List Law. A certificate of the proclamation will not be issued to Cardema and he shall not be able to seat in the House of Representatives of the Philippines.

The COMELEC also disagreed with Cardema's claim that the organization represented professionals, stating, "Records would show that the Respondent started to highlight the professionals only after the filing of a petition against him questioning his eligibility to represent the youth sector. Pursuing such afterthought would not be enough to comply with the express mandate of Party-list law which requires changes in affiliation should be done at least six months before the election to be eligible for nomination."

On February 12, 2020, the COMELEC ruled with finality the disqualification of Ronald Cardema's nomination of the party-list group, Duterte Youth. The ruling junks Cardema's motion for reconsideration, noting that Cardema's own filling of his withdrawal as the first nominee being ineligible to sit as a youth sector representative tantamounts to "acceptance of the ruling".

On October 13, 2020, the COMELEC granted Duterte Youth partylist nominee, Ducielle Marie Suárez Cardema, a certificate of proclamation. Youth groups protested Duterte Youth's proclamation. A statement by 46 youth groups said that "Duterte Youth is neither a genuine youth organization nor does it sincerely serve the interests of the Filipino Youth". The statement also said, "As young people, we refuse to be represented by a fake youth organization founded by Ronald Cardema who has a proven track record of lying to advance his political ambitions".

=== Cancellation of party-list registration ===
In the 2025 midterm elections, Duterte Youth received 2.3 million votes, potentially earning them 3 seats in the House of Representatives. On May 19, 2025, the COMELEC suspended Duterte Youth's proclamation following pending resolutions seeking to disqualify Duterte Youth from the elections.

On June 18, the 2nd division of COMELEC acting on the 2019 petition cancelled Duterte Youth's registration. This was despite the Duterte's Youth challenge that the petition is moot since it was filed after its nominee has taken seat back in the 18th Congress. It still can be challenged by a motion for reconsideration within five days. On June 23, the Duterte Youth filed a motion for reconsideration.

The Duterte Youth's registration was cancelled due to:

- Failure to publish its petition and the commission's hearing notice in two national newspapers as mandated by the Comelec Resolution 9366 and constitution.
- Material misrepresentation
  - Nominees were ineligible under the Party-List System Act. Ronald Cardema's substitution was blocked due to age eligibility requirements.
  - No genuine intention to represent the youth sector. Bypass was attempted by stating it also represent young professionals, which the COMELEC ruled to be part of the youth.
  - Promoted or advocated violence. It noted Duterte Youth's call to commit unlawful action towards activists.
  - Was supported by the National Youth Commission, violating independence requirements
  - Registration bid was merely an attempt to mock the electoral process

The Duterte Youth argued that it is the responsibility of the COMELEC to petition for registration and issue a notice of hearing and that no directive was issued to the partylist group to do the same. It said its failure to do so cannot be construed to be a mockery of the electoral process.

On August 29, the COMELEC upheld the ruling canceling Duterte Youth's party-list registration. On September 30, the Supreme Court rejected Duterte Youth's request for a temporary restraining order. On October 1, the COMELEC announced that the Duterte Youth’s party-list registration was officially cancelled making their 3 claimed seats up for distribution to other partylists.

== Political positions ==
Ronald Cardema at an anti-Communist rally on January 26, 2021

According to Cardema in December 2016, his group supported all of Duterte's policies including the death penalty and federalism, with the exception of the deadly war on drugs. He said that the group only supports detainment of suspected drug lords and users. Cardema suggests rehabilitating addicts pointing to the fact that a drug rehabilitation facility had just opened at that time.

In August 2016, the group has expressed support for the revival of mandatory Reserve Officers' Training Corps program for college students as well as support for Citizenship Advancement Training for high school students and scouting for elementary students. The Duterte Youth cited South Korea and Singapore for their similar programs for the youth which they believe has instilled nationalism, discipline and cooperation among their youth.

When the group reportedly announced their recruitment plans, the youth organization said that they will help secure the presidency of Duterte against plots to oust him, as well as help the police and military detain criminals.

Activist and lawyer Renee Co of Kabataan party-list called Duterte Youth a fake partylist. Co criticized Duterte Youth's alleged silence on national issues and that Duterte Youth filed to impeach President Bongbong Marcos only after former President Rodrigo Duterte was arrested under an International Criminal Court warrant. Gabriela Youth said that "Duterte Youth is a fraud. They do not represent the dreams, demands, or struggles of the Filipino youth. What they represent is a legacy of red-tagging, militarism, and violence—especially toward women, LGBTQ+ youth, and those who dare to speak out".

=== Red-tagging ===
Duterte Youth has been accused of red-tagging progressive groups, civic groups, and organizations that criticize the government. Human rights organization Karapatan criticized Duterte Youth for alleged red-tagging and for having links with the Armed Forces of the Philippines.

In August 2024, during deliberations in the House of Representatives on the budget of the National Youth Commission (NYC), NYC chair Ronald Cardema stated that definitions of red-tagging and academic freedom were vague. This prompted Kabataan party-list Representative Raoul Manuel to say that Ronald Cardema was spreading disinformation since the Supreme Court had already defined red-tagging and its effects on red-tagged individuals. Manuel also said that there was a conflict of interest with NYC's budget being deliberated on by Duterte Youth Representative Drixie Mae Cardema, who is related to the NYC chair.

In May 2025, Youth Alliance for Climate Action Philippines (YACAP) and student regents from the University of the Philippines and the Polytechnic University of the Philippines filed a disqualification complaint against Duterte Youth for the alleged red-tagging of students who criticize the government. The complaint alleged violations of Comelec Resolution 11116, created to promote anti-discrimination and fair campaigning. In the same month, youth group Kabataan, Tayo Ang Pag-asa called on the COMELEC to disqualify Duterte Youth for red-tagging and disinformation, which threatens the welfare of the youth sector.

== Legal actions initiated by the Duterte Youth ==
On June 21, 2022, Duterte Youth party-list filed a petition asking the Supreme Court (SC) to prohibit Rowena Guanzon from taking a seat designated for the P3PWD party-list. The SC decided on June 29 to temporarily stop a COMELEC resolution allowing her substitution.

In 2024, the Supreme Court barred Guanzon from taking her congressional office by nullifying her nomination, citing grave abuse of discretion by COMELEC in approving her substitution past the designated deadline. The High Tribunal also granted Duterte Youth's petition to declare null and void Rosalie J. Garcia, Cherie B. Belmonte-Lim, Donnabel C. Tenorio, and Rodolfo B. Villar's nominations.

== Electoral results ==
Election	Votes	%	Secured Seats	Congress	Representative
2019	354,629	1.27%	1 / 3	18th Congress; 2019–2022	Ducielle Cardema (de facto)
2022	602,196	1.64%	1 / 3	19th Congress; 2022–2025	Drixie Mae Cardema (de facto)
2025	2,338,564	5.57%	0 / 3 (originally 3; nullified by COMELEC)	20th Congress; 2025–2028	Registration voided ab initio
Note: A party-list group, can win a maximum of three seats in the House of Representatives.

== See also ==
- Dutertismo
