= Ronald Cardema =

Filipino political activist (born 1985)

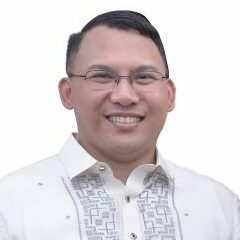
- Cardema in 2023

Chairman of the National Youth Commission
- In office January 17, 2022 – August 29, 2024
- President: Rodrigo Duterte; Bongbong Marcos
- Preceded by: Ryan Enriquez
- Succeeded by: Joseph Francisco Ortega
- In office August 28, 2018 (Note: Served as Officer in Charge of the National Youth Commission from April 5, 2018 to August 28, 2018.) – May 12, 2019
- President: Rodrigo Duterte
- Preceded by: Ice Seguerra
- Succeeded by: Ryan Enriquez

Commissioner of the National Youth Commission for Luzon
- In office August 24, 2017 – August 28, 2018
- President: Rodrigo Duterte

Personal details
- Born: Ronald Gian Carlo Lapitan Cardema; April 12, 1985 (age 41) Calamba, Laguna, Philippines
- Party: Nacionalista (2024–present); Duterte Youth (party-list)
- Spouse: Ducielle Suarez
- Relatives: Drixie Mae Cardema (sister-in-law)
- Education: Maquiling School; University of the Philippines (did not finish)
- Occupation: Government official

Ronald Gian Carlo Lapitan Cardema (born April 12, 1985) is a Filipino politician who is the founder and chairman of the Duterte Youth. President Rodrigo Duterte twice appointed him as chairman of the National Youth Commission.

== Early life and education ==
Cardema was born on April 12, 1985. He actively participated in extra-curriculars as a student. In elementary school, he was a leader in the Boy Scouts of the Philippines while in secondary school he was high school corps commander under the Maquiling School’s Citizen Army Training. In 2008, Carderma was corps commander of the Reserve Officers' Training Corps at the University of the Philippines-Diliman. He also became UP Los Banos’ ROTC class president in the unit.

Cardema was a cadet at the Philippine Military Academy but was dismissed for allegedly communicating with Communist Party of the Philippines (CPP) founding chairman Jose Maria Sison. According to Sison, Cardema was removed from the academy after he called for justice for the death of his uncle under a military death squad.

As of 2019, Cardema did not graduate from a college or university.

== Career ==
Cardema is known for his ardent support of President Rodrigo Duterte. He founded the Duterte Youth in 2016 to support the Duterte's presidential campaign.

=== First National Youth Commission stint ===
On August 24, 2017, Duterte appointed Cardema to the National Youth Commission (NYC) as commissioner representing Luzon. Upon Ice Seguerra's resignation as NYC chairperson effective on April 5, 2018, Cardema became the Officer in Charge until Duterte formally appointed him as the new NYC chairperson on August 28, 2018. He resigned in May 2019 to vie for a seat in the House of Representatives.

=== 2019 Duterte Youth seat bid ===
==== Substitution ====
In 2019, the Duterte Youth vied for party-list representation in the House of Representatives. It won a seat in the 2019 elections. Their five official nominees were as follows from 1st to 5th: (Ducielle Marie Suarez, Joseph de Guzman, Benilda de Guzman, Arnaldo Villafranca, and Elizabeth Anne Cardema). However, all five nominees withdrew and Ronald Cardema who was National Youth Commission chair at the time filed a substitution in a bid to fill the seat himself. In relation to Cardema's bid, factors whether he filed substitution in time before polls closed on May 13 and whether he is qualified to represent the Duterte Youth in the House of Representatives were put into dispute.

Six of the seven members of the Comelec decided to give "due course" or deliberate further on Cardema's bid and four others accepted the withdrawal of Duterte Youth's five initial nominees. Only Election Commissioner Rowena Guanzon expressed dissent who argued that the three original nominees of ages 31 to 36, and also Cardema who is 34 years old, are not eligible to represent the party-list as a representative of the youth sector as per Section 9 of the Republic Act No. 7941 given that nominees should be aged 25 to 30 on election day. The commissioner also views the filing of the withdrawal of the original nominees at 5:30 p.m. on May 12, 2019, a Sunday, as invalid since its contrary to Resolution No. 8665 which states that filing should be done on a regular working day during office hours. Cardema defended his eligibility insisting that the party while it represents the youth, also represents professionals in general as well.

Cardema's bid was criticized by Senator Panfilo Lacson who said that the Duterte Youth partylist and its leader "are one of the many reasons" that the party-list representation system has become a "joke".

==== Disqualification ====
On August 5, 2019, the first division of the Commission on Elections (Philippines) (COMELEC) canceled his nomination as the party-list representative of Duterte Youth by a vote of 2–0. The decision was concurred by commissioners Rowena Guanzon and Marlon Casquejo, while Commissioner Al Parreño was away on official businesses. The cancellation stemmed from Cardema's claim that he was eligible for nomination on his Certificate of Acceptance and Nomination, which the COMELEC deemed "material misrepresentation" because of the 25- to 30-year-old age requirement as set out by the Party List Law. A certificate of the proclamation will not be issued to Cardema and he shall not be able to seat in the House of Representatives of the Philippines. The COMELEC also disagreed with Cardema's claim that the organization represented professionals, stating, "“Records would show that the Respondent started to highlight the professionals only after the filing of a petition against him questioning his eligibility to represent the youth sector. Pursuing such afterthought would not be enough to comply with the express mandate of Party-list law which requires changes in affiliation should be done at least six months before the election to be eligible for nomination.”

On February 12, 2020, the COMELEC in a ruling ruled with finality the disqualification of Ronald Cardema's nomination of the party-list group, Duterte Youth. The ruling that junks the motion for reconsideration (MR) filed by Cardema, noted that Cardema's own filling of his withdrawal as the first nominee being ineligible to sit as a youth sector representative tantamounts to "acceptance of the ruling".

On October 13, 2020, the COMELEC granted Duterte Youth partylist nominee, Ducielle Marie Suárez, who is also Cardema's wife, a certificate of proclamation.

=== Second National Youth Commission stint ===
Cardema returned to National Youth Commission when he was appointed as commissioner by President Duterte in August 2020 after his failed bid to fill Duterte Youth's seat. He was appointed as NYC chairman once again on January 17, 2022, succeeding Ryan Enriquez.

In September 2022, Kabataan Representative Raoul Manuel called on Cardema to resign as National Youth Commission chair over allegations of corruption and misappropriation of funds at the commission.

=== 2025 elections ===
In 2025, Cardema ran for Laguna Provincial Board membership for the newly created Sangguniang Panlalawigan district of Calamba, under Nacionalista Party. However, he lost, placing 3rd out of the two seats.

Cardema later called for the resignation of Commission on Elections Chairman George Erwin Garcia over the suspension of Duterte Youth's proclamation as a winner in the House elections. The suspension, which eventually led to the nullification of the party-list's registration, was due to the group's pending cases filed way back in 2019 to question its ability to participate in the party-list race.

== Political positions ==
=== General stance against Communists and other leftists ===
In the early part of Duterte's presidency in 2016 when the leader was still friendly with Communist rebels and had leftist appointees to his Cabinet, Cardema reached out to the Communist Party of the Philippines for possible project cooperation with the Duterte Youth, including the creation of a paramilitary group. However he later became anti-communist and "losing faith with the CPP" after the Pandi housing project occupation and continued rebel offensives despite government peace negotiations.

Antonio Parlade Jr. of the National Task Force to End Local Communist Armed Conflict (NTF-ELCAC) considers Cardema as a credible critic of the Makabayan bloc of the House of Representatives.

Cardema in 2019 advocated the revocation of government scholarships for students that have links to the Communist Party of the Philippines, New People's Army, and the National Democratic Front.

=== Mandatory military service ===
Cardema is an advocate of reviving the Reserve Officers' Training Corps (ROTC) program as a mandatory military service for Filipino college students. He believes that the program promotes "nationalism, discipline, and preparedness among young Filipinos that can easily be tapped by the government to help the country in times of need". He likewise advocates for Citizens Army Training (CAT) for high schoolers and scouting for elementary schoolers.

== Personal life ==
Cardema is married to Ducielle Suarez. His sister-in-law and Ducielle's sister, Drixie Mae Cardema is a member of the House of Representatives for Duterte Youth who uses his family name.
