= Koko Pimentel =

Filipino politician (born 1964)

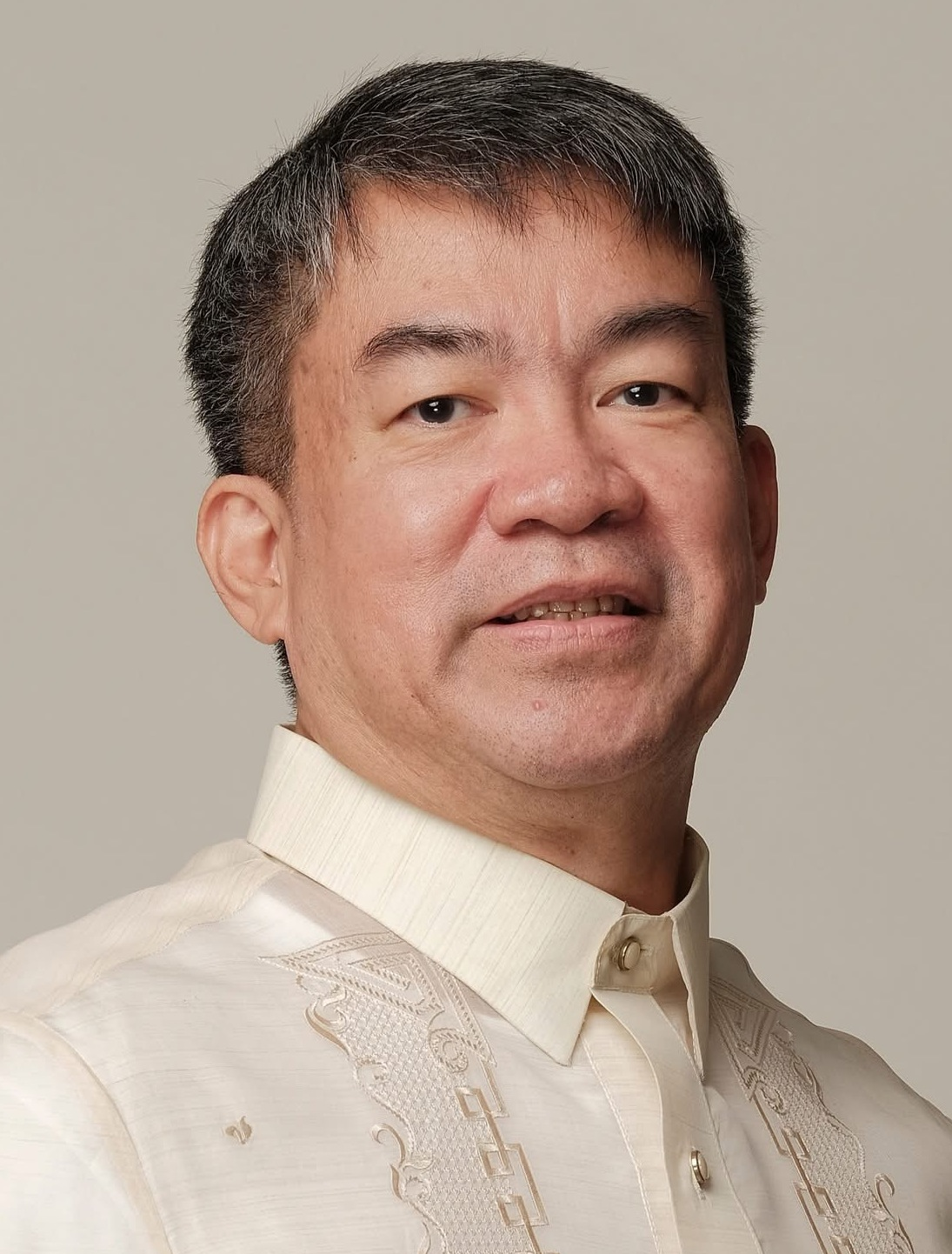
- Official portrait, 2022

28th President of the Senate of the Philippines
- In office July 25, 2016 – May 21, 2018
- Preceded by: Franklin Drilon
- Succeeded by: Tito Sotto

Senate Minority Leader
- In office July 25, 2022 – June 30, 2025
- Preceded by: Franklin Drilon
- Succeeded by: Tito Sotto

Senator of the Philippines
- In office August 11, 2011 – June 30, 2025
Committee positions
Chair of the Senate Foreign Relations Committee
In office July 23, 2019 – June 30, 2022
Preceded by	Loren Legarda
Succeeded by	Imee Marcos
Chair of the Senate Trade, Commerce and Entrepreneurship Committee
In office May 25, 2018 – June 30, 2022
Preceded by	Juan Miguel Zubiri
Succeeded by	Mark Villar
Chair of the Senate Electoral Reforms and People's Participation Committee
In office July 24, 2018 – June 30, 2019
Preceded by	Leila de Lima
Succeeded by	Imee Marcos
In office July 22, 2013 – June 30, 2016
Preceded by	Position established
Succeeded by	Leila de Lima
Chair of the Senate Justice and Human Rights Committee
In office August 21, 2024 – June 30, 2025
Preceded by	Sonny Angara
Succeeded by	Alan Peter Cayetano
In office July 22, 2013 – June 30, 2016
Preceded by	Francis Escudero
Succeeded by	Leila de Lima

Commissioner of the National Youth Commission for Mindanao
- In office 1996–1998
- President: Fidel V. Ramos
- Chairperson: Amina Rasul

Personal details
- Born: Aquilino Martin de la Llana Pimentel III; January 20, 1964 (age 62) Cagayan de Oro, Philippines
- Party: Nacionalista (2024–present)
- Other political affiliations: PDP–Laban (2001–2024; claims continued membership (Note: Continues to claim to be the member of the party from 2021. He considers his faction as the legitimate party)); LDP (2001)
- Spouses: Jewel May Lobaton (m. 2000; ann. 2018) Kathryna Yu (m. 2018)
- Children: 3
- Parents: Nene Pimentel; Lourdes de la Llana
- Education: Ateneo de Manila University (BS); University of the Philippines Diliman (LL.B)
- Occupation: Politician
- Profession: Lawyer; lecturer

Aquilino Martin "Koko" de la Llana Pimentel III (Tagalog pronunciation: [pimenˈtel]; born January 20, 1964) is a Filipino politician and lawyer who served as a senator of the Philippines from 2011 to 2025. During his tenure, he served as Senate president from 2016 to 2018 and Senate minority leader from 2022 to 2025.

The eldest son of former Senate president Nene Pimentel, the younger Pimentel is the first child of a previous Senate president to hold the office. Pimentel narrowly lost his bid for the Senate in 2007 to Juan Miguel Zubiri, which led to an electoral protest that overturned the initial result, resulting in his proclamation as a senator, taking office in August 2011, four years following the election. Pimentel was subsequently re-elected to the Senate in 2013 under Team PNoy and in 2019 under the Hugpong ng Pagbabago.

Pimentel ran in the 2025 Philippine House of Representatives elections to represent Marikina's first district in the lower house, facing off against Marcelino Teodoro, the outgoing mayor of Marikina. He lost to Teodoro by a wide margin.

== Early life and education ==
Aquilino Martin de la Llana Pimentel III was born on January 20, 1964, in Cagayan de Oro, Philippines. His parents are Aquilino Pimentel, Jr. and Lourdes de la Llana-Pimentel. His father was a lawyer and dean of law at Xavier University at the time of his birth and was elected to the Senate in 1987. His sister, Gwendolyn, was appointed in 2015 as a commissioner of the Commission on Human Rights.

Pimentel earned his Bachelor of Science degree in Mathematics from Ateneo de Manila University and his Bachelor of Laws from University of the Philippines College of Law. He topped the 1990 Philippine Bar Examinations with a score of 89.85 percent.

== Legal career and political beginnings ==
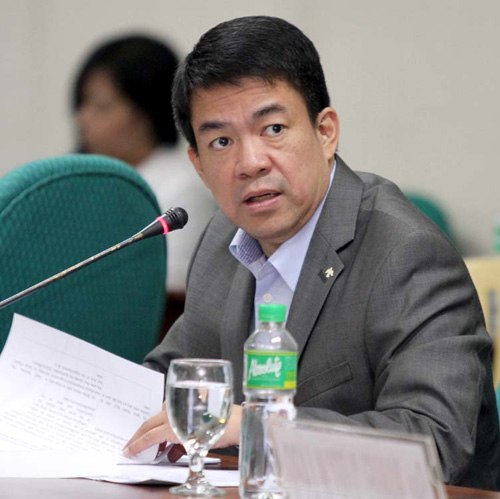
Pimentel, chair of the Senate Committee on Electoral Reforms and People's Participation, presides over the Bicameral Conference Committee.

After passing the bar exam in 1990, Pimentel began working as a lawyer at his father's law firm Aquilino Q. Pimentel, Jr. and Associates Law Office in Pasig in 1992, serving there until 1998. He was commissioner on the National Youth Commission, representing Mindanao, from 1995 to 1998. He was a professor for the University of the East College of Law from 2007 to 2010 and also for the JD–MBA Program of the Ramon V. del Rosario College of Business and Far Eastern University Institute of Law from 2006 until his election to the senate in August 2011.

Pimentel ran for Cagayan de Oro city mayor in the 2001 elections but lost to Vicente Emano.

== Philippine Senate campaigns ==
=== 2007 election ===
Running in only his second race in the May 14, 2007, senatorial elections, Pimentel was narrowly defeated by Bukidnon Congressman Miguel Zubiri for the 12th and last slot in the Philippine Senate. The narrow margin of 18,372 votes was contested, particularly the votes from the southern Philippine province of Maguindanao, where Pimentel had lost heavily to Zubiri.

==== Electoral protest ====
In Philippine senatorial elections, the twelve candidates with the highest number of votes nationwide are elected. In the 2007 elections, Pimentel (Genuine Opposition) and Migz Zubiri (TEAM Unity) contested the 12th seat.

In the final tally for the 2007 senatorial elections by the Commission on Elections (COMELEC), Zubiri narrowly defeated Pimentel for the 12th and last seat in the Senate. Zubiri had a total of 11,005,866 votes against Pimentel's 10,984,347 votes. On July 14, 2007, Zubiri was proclaimed as the 12th winning senator.

Claiming fraudulent votes in 22 municipalities of Maguindanao, seven in Lanao del Norte, three in Shariff Kabunsuan, two in Basilan, two in Sultan Kudarat, four in Lanao del Sur, and four in Sulu, Pimentel petitioned the Supreme Court to issue a restraining order against the proclamation of Zubiri. With the vote tied at 7–7, the Supreme Court dismissed Pimentel's petition. But then-Chief Justice Reynato Puno was among the seven justices who favored Pimentel's petition.

On July 14, 2007, Pimentel filed an electoral protest to the Senate Electoral Tribunal (SET). After finding grounds for a recount, the SET proceeded with the protest.

In July 2011, former Maguindanao election supervisor Lintang Bedol and suspended Autonomous Region in Muslim Mindanao governor Zaldy Ampatuan revealed that there was massive election fraud during the 2007 election.

On August 11, 2011, the Senate Electoral Tribunal released the final tally: Pimentel got 10,898,786 votes while Zubiri got 10,640,620. Prior to this, on August 3, 2011, Zubiri resigned from the Senate; however, he reiterated that he was not involved in the 2007 electoral fraud.

On August 11, 2011, Pimentel was proclaimed by the Senate Electoral Tribunal as the rightful winner of the 12th senate seat.

=== 2013 election ===
Pimentel was included in the United Nationalist Alliance (UNA) coalition's shortlist of senatorial candidates for the 2013 election. However, citing UNA's senatorial slate now having more than twelve members and the inclusion of his longtime political rival, Migz Zubiri, Pimentel officially declined his spot in the UNA coalition on June 28, 2012. Instead, Pimentel ran under the Team PNoy coalition, composed mostly of supporters of then-President Benigno Aquino III. Pimentel was elected to the Senate of the Philippines, placing eighth with 14,725,114 votes.

=== 2019 election ===
Pimentel resigned from his position as Senate President on May 21, 2018, to focus on his reelection bid in the 2019 election and was succeeded by Majority Leader Tito Sotto. Lawyers Ferdinand Topacio and Glenn Chong separately filed two petitions against Pimentel's senatorial bid for serving more than two consecutive terms. COMELEC dismissed the petitions in February 2019 as Pimentel did not fully serve his first term as senator. Pimentel, president of PDP–Laban, was elected as senator and ranked tenth with 14,668,665 votes.

== Senate of the Philippines (2011–2025) ==
After being proclaimed as a winning candidate in the 2007 Senate race, Pimentel took his oath of office on August 12, 2011, before his supporters in Mati, Davao Oriental, where he received a high number of votes.

=== Senate President (2016–2018) ===
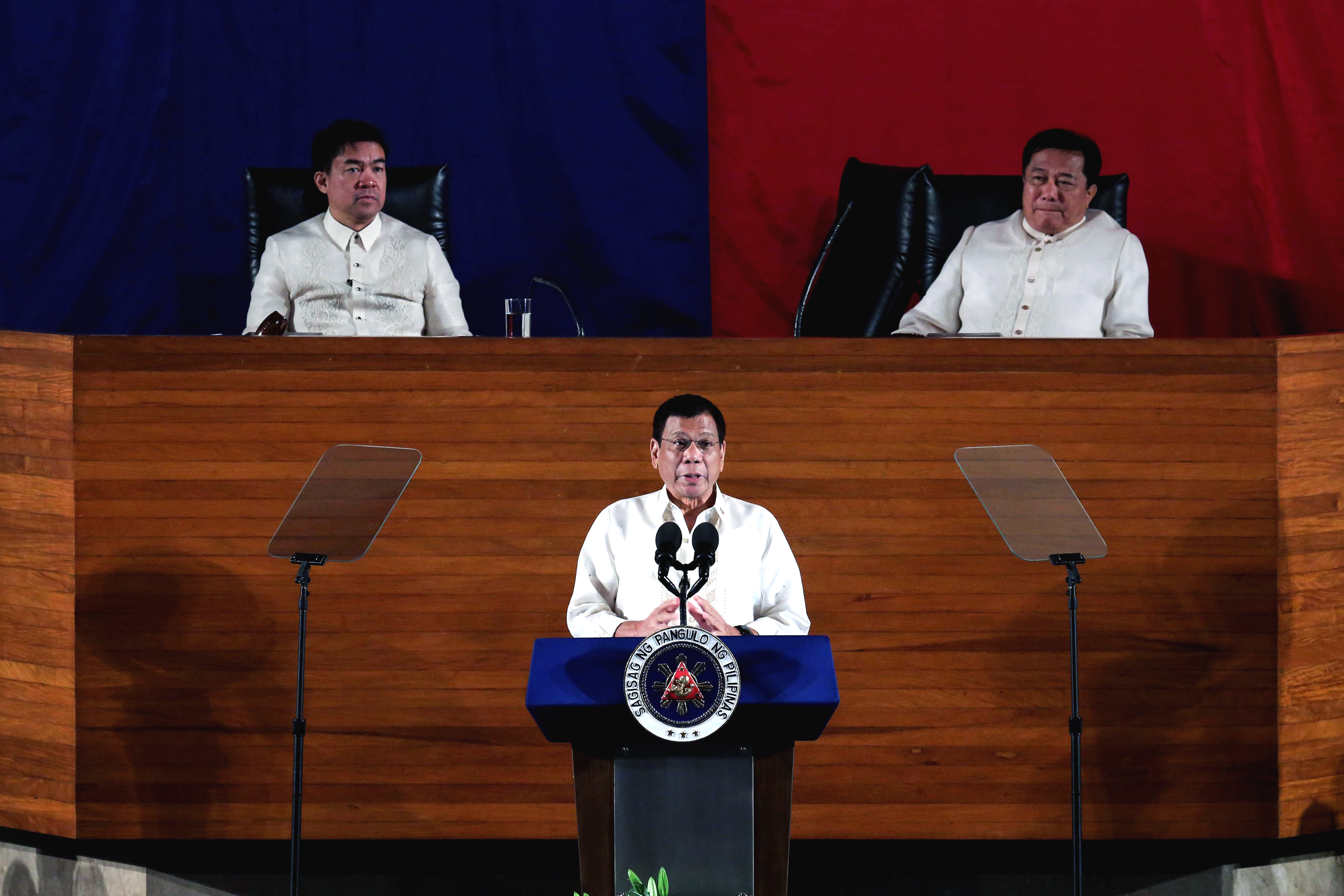
Pimentel (top left) during President Rodrigo Duterte's 2016 State of the Nation Address.

On July 25, 2016, the opening day of the 17th Congress of the Philippines, Pimentel was elected as Senate President with 20 out of 23 senators voting in his favor. He, along with his father Nene Pimentel, is the only father-and-son tandem being elected as Senate President in Philippine history; the elder Pimentel served as Senate President from 2000 to 2001.

In November 2016, Pimentel told Palace Communications Secretary Martin Andanar to "Review your history.", after Andanar referred to anti-Marcos protesters who opposed the hero's burial of the late dictator as "temperamental brats". Pimentel called the protestors "principled", adding that "they come from the poorest sectors of society and therefore, cannot be labeled as "brats. They can never be called brats. These are actually principled positions. So Martin Andanar should review his history."

In May 2017, Pimentel led 15 senators who supported Proclamation No. 216 which placed the whole of Mindanao under Martial Law. Pimentel also led 12 senators who voted against Resolution 390 calling on Congress to convene a joint session to tackle the declaration of martial law in Mindanao. This opinion was contradicted by Pimentel's father and former Senate President, Nene Pimentel, who posited, "Within 48 hours from declaration of martial law, President [Rodrigo] Duterte is obligated to submit his report in writing or in person before the Senate and the House in joint session".

=== COVID-19 quarantine protocol breach (2020–2021) ===
On March 24, 2020, Pimentel accompanied his pregnant wife Kathryna in visiting the Makati Medical Center in anticipation of their child's birth. Later in the evening, Pimentel received notice that his COVID-19 test from March 20 emerged positive, with him later claiming to have immediately left the hospital after being notified. Upon announcing his positive COVID test the day after, Pimentel's hospital visit received heavy criticism for breaching quarantine protocol during the start of the COVID-19 pandemic. His March 16 visit to an S&R retail store in Bonifacio Global City, Taguig was also revealed on March 25, resulting in several S&R employees who came in contact with him being placed in quarantine.

Makati Medical Center director Saturnino Javier issued a press release on March 25 denouncing Pimentel's visit for violating the hospital's "home quarantine protocol", with Health Secretary Francisco Duque III later confirming Pimentel's breach of protocol. Six to eight staff members of MMC were determined to have been in contact with Pimentel according to Javier, while the scheduled March 25 caesarian birth of Pimentel's daughter was delayed to accommodate Kathryna's COVID test. Later that evening, Pimentel publicly apologized to the hospital, and by March 29, his daughter Helena was reported to have been born in a different hospital. On May 2, 2020, Pimentel considered himself as a "recovered person" as his COVID test came back negative.

Pimentel's conduct began to be probed by the National Bureau of Investigation on April 1, 2020, while a separate lawsuit was filed by a lawyer five days later before the Department of Justice for Pimentel's breach of quarantine protocol. The latter case was dismissed by the DOJ in January 2021 for relying on hearsay.

=== PDP–Laban dispute (2020–2022) ===
In December 2020, Pimentel nominated Senator Manny Pacquiao as party president. Despite this, Pacquiao was allegedly kept out of party meetings by vice chairperson and Energy secretary Alfonso Cusi, leading to the PDP-Laban dispute in 2021. A faction of party members headed by Cusi ousted Pacquiao as party president and Pimentel as the party executive vice chairperson on July 17, 2021. As a result, Pacquiao and Pimentel organized a new faction. Duterte later on pinned Pimentel for causing the dispute by naming Pacquiao as party president.

=== 2022 elections ===
Being only halfway through his second full term as Senator, Pimentel was not up for re-election in the 2022 senatorial elections (Senators serve six-year terms, with half being chosen every three years). However, his faction of the PDP–Laban named Pacquiao as their official standard bearer in the 2022 presidential elections. On March 22, 2022, the Cusi wing of PDP–Laban endorsed the presidential candidacy of Bongbong Marcos, drawing criticism from Pimentel, who declared that the Cusi wing are "total strangers" to the founding of the PDP-Laban party, which was established as the opposition to the dictatorship of Marcos's father, Ferdinand Marcos. He subsequently called on members of the Cusi faction to remember the history and principles of PDP–Laban, stating that in these beliefs, "we cannot possibly endorse Ferdinand Marcos Jr".

With a Supreme Court ruling in 1997 ordering the heirs of Ferdinand Marcos to pay ₱23.29 billion in estate tax returns to the Bureau of Internal Revenue, which has since ballooned to ₱203 billion in 2022, Pimentel filed Senate Resolution No. 998 on March 28, 2022, stating an urgent and pressing need for the Senate to look into why the estate tax has remained uncollected for almost 25 years.

=== Senate Minority Leader (2022–2025) ===
On July 25, 2022, Pimentel was elected as senate minority floor leader. He is part of the two-member minority bloc in the Senate alongside Risa Hontiveros in the 19th Congress of the Philippines. He, along with his father Aquilino Pimentel Jr., is the second father-and-son tandem to be elected as Senate Minority Floor Leader in Philippine history after Lorenzo Tañada and Wigberto Tañada; the elder Pimentel served as Minority Leader from 2001 to 2002 and from 2004 to 2010. Like his father, Pimentel became Minority Leader after serving as Senate President.

== 2025 Marikina congressional campaign ==
Pimentel intended to retire following the conclusion of his Senate term in 2025, as his wife, Kathryna, prepared to run for a seat in the House of Representatives, representing Marikina's first district. The couple allied with the incumbent administration led by Marcelino Teodoro and subsequently accompanied them in local projects and programs.

The alliance broke down during the filling of the certificates of candidacies on October 6, when Teodoro filed to run for representative in the first district, contradicting a supposed plan in which Kathryna or Pimentel would in the first district, whereas Teodoro would run in the second. Regardless, Pimentel subsequently filed to run for the seat under the Nacionalista Party, while remaining the leader of his wing in the PDP–Laban. The local opposition led by representative and mayoral candidate Stella Quimbo endorsed Pimentel, including him in her slate.

During the campaign, Pimentel was criticized online for appearing at an orientation for the TUPAD program of the Department of Labor and Employment in Parang on the first day of the campaign period.

=== Results and aftermath ===
In the May 12, 2025, election, Pimentel lost to Teodoro in a wide margin, only winning 27.93% of the vote. Despite the overwhelming margin, the COMELEC suspended Teodoro's proclamation as the winning candidate as his case on material misrepresentation has yet to be resolved by the COMELEC en banc. The commission ruled on June 26 that was able to prove his residency claim through official documents, identity documents, and affidavits from local residents and barangay officials proving that he had legally returned to his San Roque residence and had legitimate historical ties to the district. Pimentel criticized the time it took for the COMELEC to reach a decision, placing doubt on the integrity of the case and announcing plans to bring the case to the Supreme Court.

== Personal life ==
Pimentel was conferred Doctor of Humanities honoris causa by the Polytechnic University of the Philippines on May 18, 2012.

Pimentel met Jewel May Lobaton, a former Sangguniang Kabataan chairwoman in Bacolod and crowned winner of Binibining Pilipinas 1998, during a blind date at Makati Shangri-La in 1999. The two married in January 2000, with President Joseph Estrada as their godfather ("ninong") at the wedding. They had two sons: Aquilino Martin Emmanuel VI (born 2004) and Aquilino Justo VII ("Akio", born 2009). Pimentel and Lobaton began living separately in November 2011, and although they attempted to date each other again in 2013, Lobaton filed a petition for annulment later that year alleging Pimentel's psychological abuse against her, and by January 2018 their marriage was annulled before a Marikina Regional Trial Court. Both Pimentel and Lobaton have denied accusations that the former committed physical abuse against Lobaton.

In May 2013, Pimentel met chef Kathryna Yu of Marikina and they married in October 2018 at the Coconut Palace. Supreme Court Associate Justice Antonio Carpio officiated the wedding, while President Rodrigo Duterte, Special Presidential Assistant Bong Go, Senate President Tito Sotto, Senator Manny Pacquiao and House Speaker Pantaleon Alvarez were principal sponsors. Yu has headed PDP Cares. During his first wedding anniversary with Yu, Pimentel announced that they were expecting their first child together. Their daughter, Maria Kathryn Helena, was born on March 29, 2020 amidst controversy regarding Pimentel's visit to the Makati Medical Center. In late 2022, Pimentel returned to Marikina as a resident, where his family had previously resided in since the 1980s.

== Electoral history ==
Electoral history of Koko Pimentel
Year	Office	Party	Votes received				Result
Year	Office	Party	Total	%	P.	Swing	Result
2001	Mayor of Cagayan de Oro	LDP	50,494	32.59%	2nd	—N/a	Lost
2007	Senator of the Philippines	PDP–Laban	10,987,347	37.25%	13th	—N/a	Won
2013	Senator of the Philippines	PDP–Laban	14,725,114	36.68%	8th	-0.57	Won
2019	Senator of the Philippines	PDP–Laban	14,668,665	31.01%	10th	-5.67	Won
2025	Representative (Marikina–1st)	Nacionalista	29,091	27.93%	2nd	—N/a	Lost

== Honours ==
- Grand Cordon of the Order of the Rising Sun (2026)

== Notes ==
Senate of the Philippines
Preceded by Francis Escudero	Chair of the Philippine Senate; Justice and Human Rights Committee; 2013–2016	Succeeded by Leila de Lima
New title	Chair of the Philippine Senate Electoral Reforms and People's Participation Committee; 2013–2016	Succeeded by Leila de Lima
Preceded by Leila de Lima	Chair of the Philippine Senate Electoral Reforms and People's Participation Committee; 2018–2019	Succeeded by Imee Marcos
Preceded by Migz Zubiri	Chair of the Philippine Senate; Trade, Commerce and Entrepreneurship Committee; 2018–present	Incumbent
Preceded by Loren Legarda	Chair of the Philippine Senate; Foreign Relations Committee; 2019–present	Incumbent
Preceded by Sonny Angara	Chair of the Philippine Senate; Justice and Human Rights Committee; 2024–present	Incumbent
Political offices
Preceded by Franklin Drilon	President of the Senate of the Philippines; 2016–2018	Succeeded by Tito Sotto
Preceded by Franklin Drilon	Senate Minority Floor Leader; 2022–2025	Succeeded by Tito Sotto
Party political offices
Preceded by Jejomar Binay	President of PDP–Laban; 2013–2020	Succeeded by Manny Pacquiao
Preceded by Rodrigo Duterte	Chairman of PDP–Laban; 2021–present	Incumbent
