= Kathryna Pimentel =

Filipino entrepreneur and envoy (born 1982)

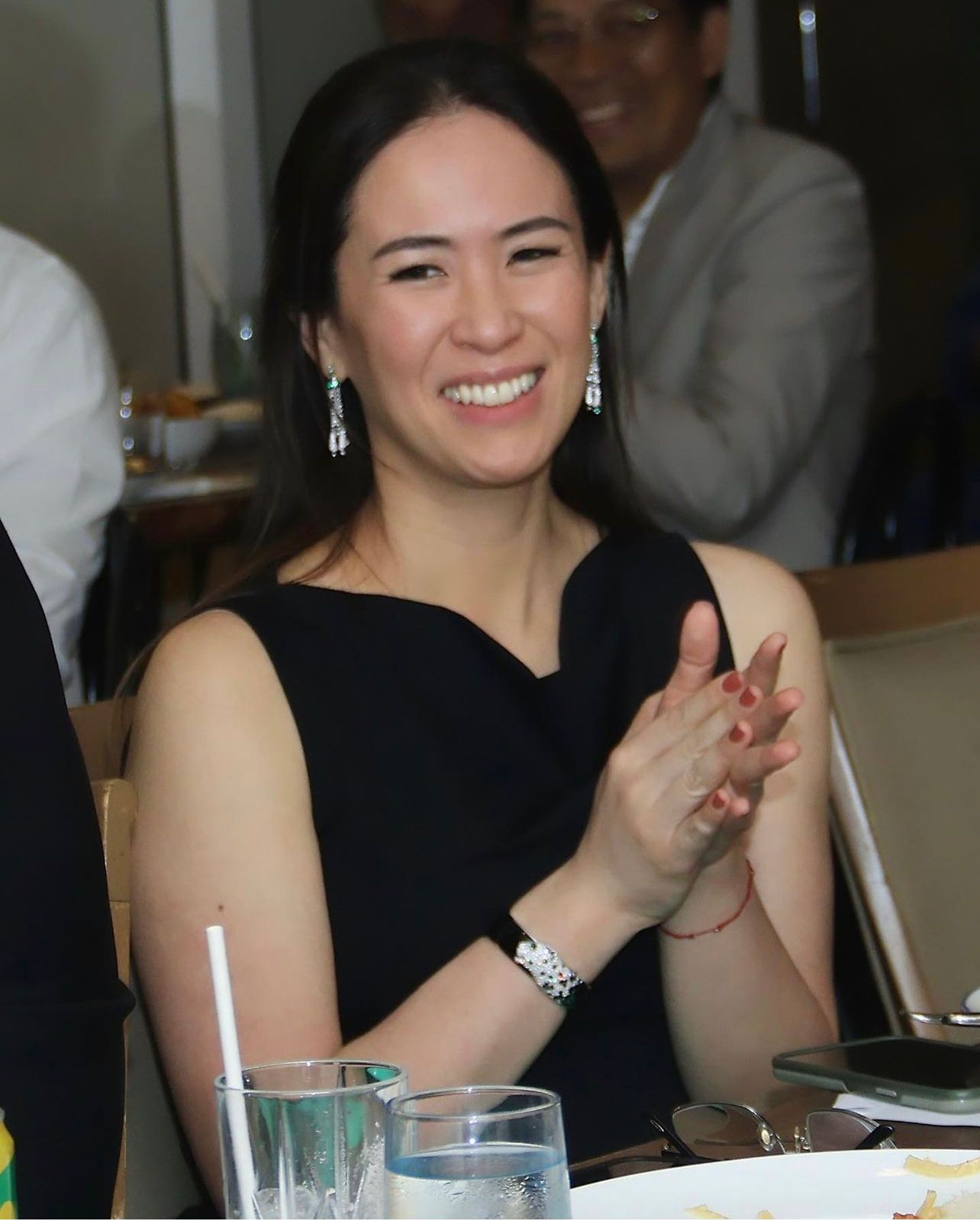
- Pimentel in 2023

Special Envoy to the United Arab Emirates for Trade and Investments
- Incumbent
- Assumed office June 4, 2024

Personal details
- Born: Ma. Anna Kathryna de Guzman Yu; October 7, 1982 (age 43) Manila, Philippines
- Spouse: Koko Pimentel (m. 2018)
- Children: 1
- Education: University of Asia and the Pacific
- Profession: Businesswoman

Kathryna Yu Pimentel (born Ma. Anna Kathryna de Guzman Yu; October 7, 1982) is a Filipino businesswoman and politician who has served as the Philippine Special Envoy to the United Arab Emirates for Trade and Investments since 2024.

== Early life and education ==
Ma. Anna Kathryna de Guzman Yu was born on October 7, 1982, in Manila, Philippines, to Benjamin Yu Jr. and Imelda "Imee" de Guzman, the latter being the daughter of Former Marikina Mayor Osmundo de Guzman. She attended Jubilee Christian Academy from grade school through high school. She earned her Bachelor of Arts in humanities with a professional certificate in management from the University of Asia and the Pacific, where she was a president of the student executive board from 2002 to 2003.

== Career ==
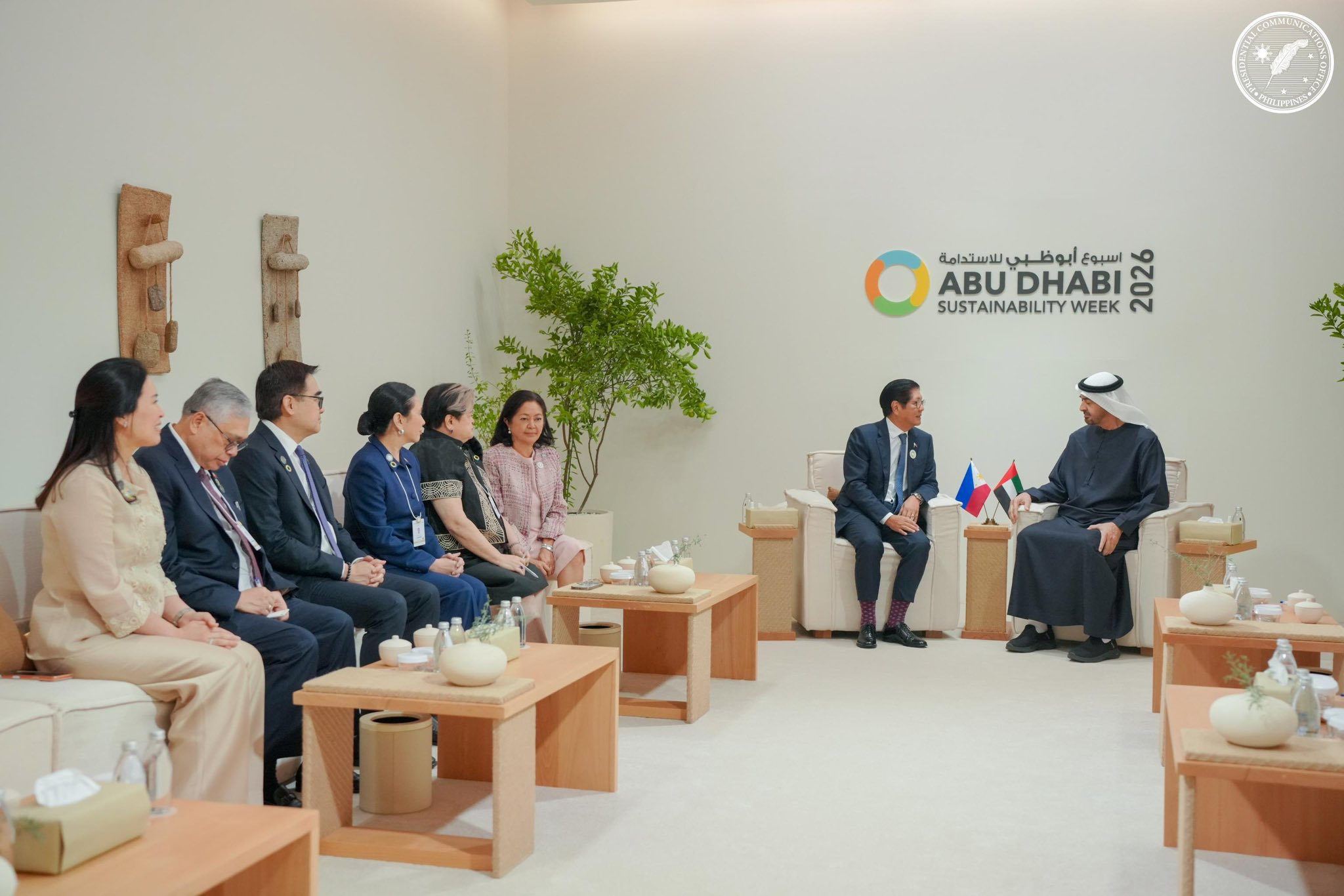
Pimentel (far left) joins President Bongbong Marcos's delegation in meeting UAE president Mohamed bin Zayed Al Nahyan (far right) in Abu Dhabi in 2026

Kathryna Yu-Pimentel began her career managing her own restaurant and catering businesses. She previously taught culinary classes at Asia Pacific College. By July 2016, she became the managing director of Pimentel Salomon Baltao-Basilio Law Office. She is the president of PDP Cares Foundation, Inc. and was its first nominee when the organization ran for party-list representation in the 2022 House of Representatives elections. She is an advocate for women and children's rights.

On June 4, 2024, she was appointed by President Bongbong Marcos as Special Envoy to the United Arab Emirates for Trade and Investment.

As the Special Envoy of the President to the United Arab Emirates, she played a pivotal role in securing the Comprehensive Economic Partnership Agreement (CEPA), the Philippines' first-ever free trade deal in the Middle East. She has been credited with strengthening diplomatic and economic ties between the two nations, facilitating a landmark agreement that is expected to significantly boost the Philippine economy through increased market access and investments.

She currently serves as the Executive Director of the Senate Spouses Foundation, Inc. (SSFI). From May 2024 to July 2025, she served as the vice-president, and was the treasurer from 2022 to 2024.

Yu-Pimentel is a co-owner of the restaurant franchise Tiong Bahru Philippines. In March 2023, she launched a wellness spa in Uptown Bonifacio, Taguig.

== Personal life ==
In May 2013, she met her husband Koko Pimentel. They married in October 2018.

She gave birth to a daughter named Ma. Kathryn Helena Yu-Pimentel on March 29, 2020. As an advocate of breastfeeding, she exclusively breastfed Helena for one and a half years.
