= PDP Cares =

Philippine non-profit organization

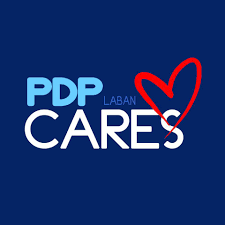
- Parent organization: PDP–Laban

PDP Cares Foundation, Inc., otherwise known as PDP (Pilipino Dapat Paglingkuran) CARES, is a non-stock, non-profit organization duly organized under the laws of the Philippines and is registered in the Securities and Exchange Commission on September 27, 2018 and has established chapters in the National Capital Region.

== Positions ==
All the officers and members of the organization adhere to the following principles:

1. Promote, advance, and protect the well-being of Filipinos, in general.

2. Develop, enhance, and improve access to facilities and services especially among poor people in both urban and rural barangays.

3. Protect our natural resources.

== Electoral history ==
=== 2022 elections ===
After gaining accreditation from the Commission on Elections, PDP Cares made their first attempt to seek a party-list representation in the Philippine House of Representatives with Kathryna Yu-Pimentel, wife of incumbent senator Aquilino "Koko" Pimentel, as their first nominee. They did not win a seat.

== Electoral performance ==
Election	Votes	%	Seats
2022	117,139	0.32%	0
