= Rowena Guanzon =

Filipina lawyer and politician (born 1957)

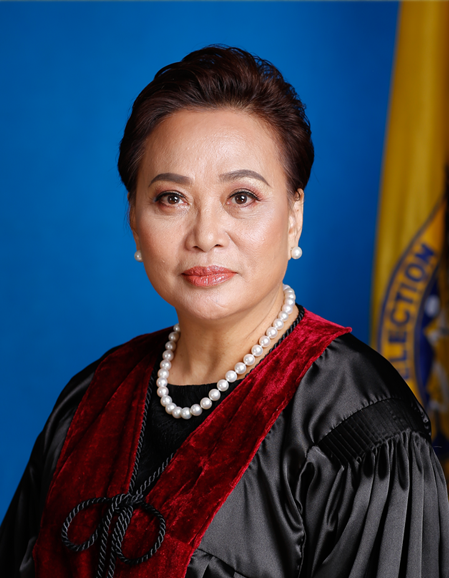
- Official portrait, 2018

Commissioner of the Commission on Elections
- In office April 28, 2015 – February 2, 2022
- Appointed by: Benigno Aquino III
- Preceded by: Elias Yusoph
- Succeeded by: Aimee Torrefranca-Neri

Commissioner of the Commission on Audit
- In office March 18, 2013 – December 2013
- Appointed by: Benigno Aquino III
- Preceded by: Juanito Espino Jr.
- Succeeded by: Jose Fabia

Mayor of Cadiz
- In office March 26, 1986 (Note: Served as Officer in Charge Mayor of Cadiz from March 26, 1986 to June 30, 1988.) – June 30, 1992
- Appointed by: Corazon Aquino
- Preceded by: Prudencio Olvido
- Succeeded by: Vicente Tabanao

Personal details
- Born: Maria Rowena Amelia Villena Guanzon; August 29, 1957 (age 69) Cadiz, Negros Occidental, Philippines
- Party: Independent (2026–present); P3PWD (Party-list; 2022–present)
- Other political affiliations: NPC (1992)
- Education: University of the Philippines Diliman (BA, LL.B.); Harvard University (MPA)
- Profession: Lawyer; public servant; politician

Maria Rowena Amelia "Bing" Villena Guanzon (Tagalog pronunciation: [rɔˈwena ˈgwanzon], born August 29, 1957), is a Filipina lawyer, public servant and politician who served as Philippine Commission on Elections commissioner under Presidents Benigno Aquino III and Rodrigo Duterte. She had been an audit commissioner before taking office at the Philippine Commission on Elections in February 2015.

Guanzon was mayor of Cadiz in Negros Occidental until 1992, and also served as chief of staff to Senator Miriam Defensor Santiago.

Guanzon is a prominent critic of the administration of President Bongbong Marcos. She is currently an ally of Vice President Sara Duterte.

== Early life and education ==
Guanzon was born on August 29, 1957, in Cadiz, Negros Occidental, as the fourth child among eight children of her father, Sixto Guanzon Sr., and her mother, Elvira Villena-Guanzon. She attended primary school at Cadiz West Elementary School in Cadiz and graduated in 1970. She attended secondary school at the Silliman University High School in Dumaguete. She was almost expelled from Siliman for protesting against school rules in her fourth year. She graduated from Siliman in 1974.

She graduated from the University of the Philippines Diliman with a degree in Economics, and earned her law degree from the University of the Philippines College of Law, graduating in the top ten of her class and receiving a dean's medal. She also holds a master's degree in public administration from Harvard University's Kennedy School of Government, where she was an Edward S. Mason fellow and class marshal until she graduated in 1995.

== Career ==
=== Mayor of Cadiz ===
Guanzon was appointed mayor of Cadiz, Negros Occidental in 1986 under the Provisional Government of the Philippines, which was formed after the 1986 People Power revolution after several other candidates had declined to be mayor of Cadiz, fearing violence from local strongman Armando Gustilo. At 28, the appointment made Guanzon the youngest mayor in the Philippines. Due to the constant harassment by Gustilo and his supporters, she carried firearms for defense.

After the ratification of the new Philippine constitution, Guanzon won the election as Cadiz mayor. She served as mayor until the end of her term in 1992.

Guanzon ran for representative of Negros Occidental's second district in 1992 as a member of NPC, but she lost the elections.

=== University of the Philippines College of Law, Diliman ===
Guanzon taught Election Law and Local Government at the University of the Philippines College of Law in UP Diliman.

=== Commission on Audit ===
On March 8, 2013, she was appointed commissioner to the Commission on Audit (COA). Guanzon served in the COA until December 2013.

=== Commission on Elections ===
On April 28, 2015, Guanzon was named a commissioner to the Commission on Elections (COMELEC). During the 2022 Philippine presidential election, Guanzon presided over the disqualification cases filed against presidential candidate Bongbong Marcos. Guanzon publicly named fellow commissioner Aimee Ferolino as "the one delaying the decision in favor of Marcos" before leaving the post. Guanzon claimed that Ferolino was purposely delaying her resolution regarding the disqualification case for Guanzon's vote to not be counted because of pending retirement. Guanzon publicly expressed dismay against Ferolino, and mentioned that an "influential senator" was also interfering with the case. Ferolino criticized Guanzon for "mind conditioning" the public against her and reiterated that "she needed more time". The First Division decided to dismiss the petition in favor of Marcos after Guanzon's retirement.

=== P3PWD Party List ===
Guanzon campaigned for the P3PWD Party List during the 2022 House of Representatives elections although she was not among the official nominees of the organization. The partylist won a single seat.

On June 14, 2022, all of P3PWD's nominees withdrew and Guanzon was named as its first nominee. The Commission on Elections approved the substitution and Guanzon took oath on June 23. Guanzon's assumption of her position as P3PWD representative was halted by a temporary restraining order by the Supreme Court taking action on the petition of Duterte Youth. In 2024, the Supreme Court barred Guanzon from taking her congressional office by nullifying her nomination, citing grave abuse of discretion by COMELEC in approving her substitution past the designated deadline.

P3PWD contended again for a seat in the House of Representatives in the 2025 elections.

=== 2028 Philippine senate campaign ===
On March 13, 2026, during the launching of the Cebu Alliance for Duterte 2028 (CAD) in Cebu City, Guanzon announced that her intention that she will run for the senate in 2028. Guanzon said that she will fight for the Visayans and reclaiming a senate seat to represent the Cebuano people despite not being Cebuano herself. Guanzon was also endorsed by CAD on that event along with pediatrician and media personality Richard Mata. Vice President Sara Duterte revealed that Guanzon and three others have expressed their interests to be a part of her slate in 2028.

== Personal life ==
Guanzon has five brothers and two sisters. She choose not to marry, describing herself as a feminism and attesting that she grew up in a family where women are neither encouraged or discourage to marry.

In late 2025, Guanzon sued a person for unjust vexation and oral defmation after she was told off for coughing in at the Power Plant Mall in Makati.

== Electoral history ==
Electoral history of Rowena Guanzon
Year	Office	Party	Votes received				Result
Year	Office	Party	Total	%	P.	Swing	Result
1992	Representative (Negros Occidental–2nd)	NPC	31,441	42.32%	2nd	—N/a	Lost
2022	Representative (Party-list)	P3PWD	391,174	1.06%	24th	—N/a	Won (annulled)
2025	Representative (Party-list)	P3PWD	214,605	0.54%	65th	—N/a	Lost

== Publications ==
- Issues and Problems in the Enforcement of the Anti-Violence Against Women and Their Children Act of 2004 Philippine Law Journal (Dec 2008)
- Constitutional Challenges to the Anti-Violence Against Women and Their Children Act of 2004 Journal of the Integrated Bar of the Philippines (March 2009)
- The Anti-Trafficking in Persons Act: Issues and Problems, Journal of the Integrated Bar of the Philippines; and Legal and Conceptual Framework of Battered Woman Syndrome as a Defense, Philippine Law Journal (Vol. 86, No. 1 December 2011)

The U.P. Law Center published Guanzon's book, The Anti-Sexual Harassment Act Notes and Cases in 2014.
