= Rehabilitation of Marawi =

Philippine project starting in 2017

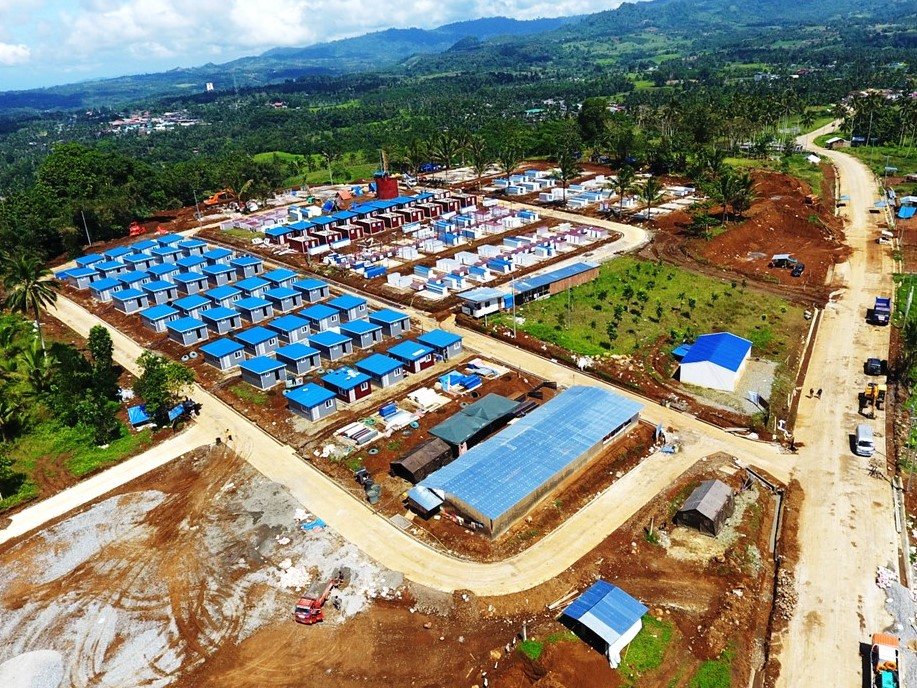
Transitory shelters built in Barangay Sagonsogan set up by Task Force Bangon Marawi

Rehabilitation of Marawi began following the end of a five month-siege in the city in October 2017. The battle left most of Marawi devastated, as government forces fought against Islamic State-affiliated militants led by Isnilon Hapilon of the Abu Sayyaf and Omar and Abdullah Maute of the Maute Group.

== History ==
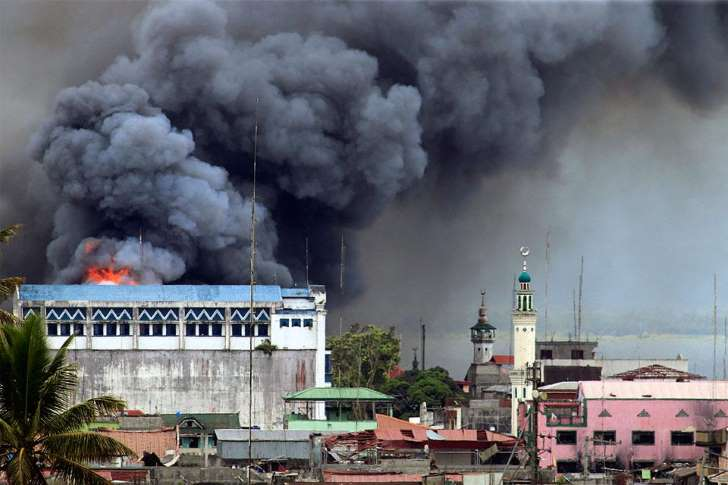
Bombing on Marawi during the siege

Amidst the ongoing Siege of Marawi, President Rodrigo Duterte created an inter-agency taskforce called Task Force Bangon Marawi on June 28, 2017, to facilitate the rehabilitation after the conflict subsides. Government funds allocated for the Philippine hosting of the regional 2019 Southeast Asian Games was initially cancelled in August 2017 and reallocated to the rehabilitation efforts; two months later, the government said that the country will remain as hosts.

On October 18, 2017, the Department of the Interior and Local Government announced that rehabilitation efforts had already begun. By October 27, 2017, a few days after the conflict ended, the Armed Forces of the Philippines dissolved its Joint Task Force Marawi, and set up Joint Task Force Ranao to facilitate the rehabilitation efforts.

The Philippine military started clearing unexploded ordnance after the battle and cleared around 85 percent of the ordnance by May 2018, facilitating the return of around 70 percent of displaced Marawi residents.

In 2020, the chair of Task Force Bangon Marawi declared that 20%-30% of Marawi City had been rehabilitated. Around 2,800 families remained in temporary shelters by November 2020. Five years after the siege, in May 2022, 72% of Marawi City had been rehabilitated. On 5 December 2024 President Bongbong Marcos (PBBM) created the Office of the Presidential Adviser for Marawi Rehabilitation and Development (OPAMRD) to implement programs, activities, and projects for the rebuilding of Marawi and nearby localities.

On June 23, 2025, Marcos visited and inspected the construction progress of Marawi Dansalan Integrated School (MDIS) in barangay Moncado Colony. The school campus is made of 10 four-storey school buildings that will accommodate children from preschool to senior high school. He also directed that the new Marawi City General Hospital to open ahead of time in August instead of September.

In April 2026, PBBM ordered acceleration of Marawi rehabilitation of key infrastructure projects and livable communities.

== Finances ==
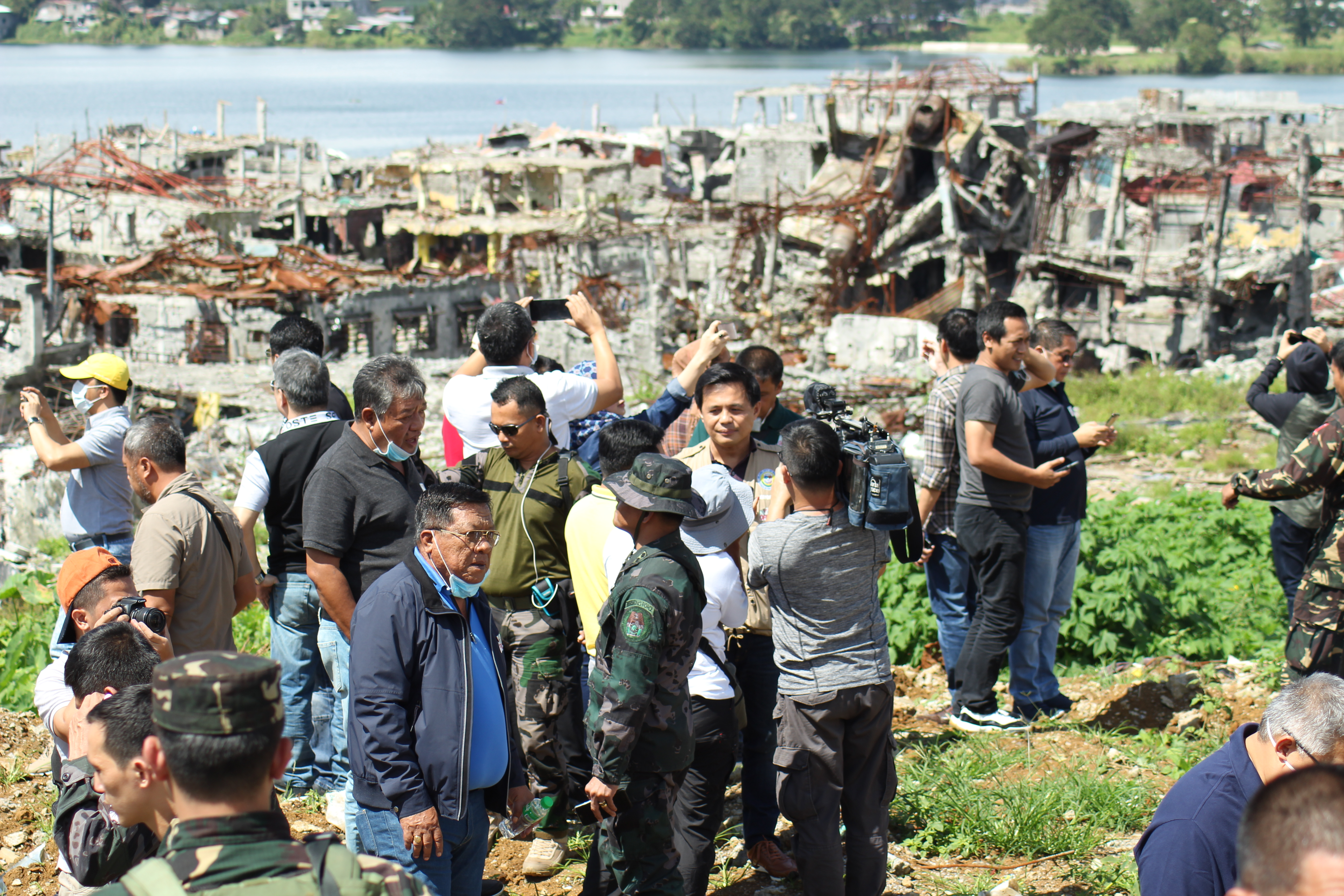
"Ground Zero" following the end of the Siege of Marawi

=== Projected cost ===
The National Economic and Development Authority released a projection stating that the necessary investments related to the rehabilitation of Marawi outside the "main battle zone" from 2018 to 2022 will cost around ₱53 billion. Task Force Bangon Marawi's estimated cost for the rehabilitation of the whole city is ₱75 to 80 billion as of May 2018.

=== Budget ===
The Philippine government has allotted a budget of ₱5 billion for the year 2017. In 2018, the allocated budget is ₱10 billion from the National Disaster Risk Reduction Management Fund and an additional ₱5 billion from the Unprogrammed Appropriations in the 2018 General Appropriations Act.

=== Foreign aid ===
Amidst the battle, some countries and international organization either pledged or gave aid for the rehabilitation of Marawi. China on its part gave a ₱15 millioncheck donation as well as shipment of heavy equipment such as excavators, bulldozers, and dump trucks. India donated about Rs 3.2 crore (Note: About ₱25 million or US$500 thousand) for the rehabilitation and relief of Marawi.

The Asian Development Bank and World Bank expressed their willingness in providing technical assistance in regards to the rehabilitation of Marawi.

By October 2017, the Philippine government has received rehabilitation aid from Canada, China, Germany, India, South Korea, Singapore, Thailand. It has also received aid from the United States Agency for International Development and the ASEAN Coordinating Center for Humanitarian Assistance on Management. Australia, Japan, the United States, as well as the European Union and the United Nations Development Program have pledged aid.

== Corruption allegations ==
In 2018, the Task Force Bangon Marawi pre-selected the Bagong Marawi Consortium to lead rehabilitation efforts, despite the consortium not having submitted basic documents, such as financial and technical proposals and costing of projects, according to a Philippine Center for Investigative Journalism (PCIJ) report. The PCIJ report said that members of the consortium had no track record in civil works and had links to failed projects. Two state-owned Chinese firms in the Bagong Marawi Consortium were in the World Bank's corruption and fraud blacklist in 2009 for being part of a "major cartel" that was "engaging in collusive practices" for a road project in the Philippines.

Moro Consensus Group in 2021 criticized the slow pace of rehabilitation of Marawi and asked the Philippine Senate to investigate corruption, such as alleged irregularities in the multibillion-peso contracts by the National Housing Authority.
