= Philippine Senate Committee on Justice and Human Rights =

Standing committee of the Senate of the Philippines

Committee on Justice and Human Rights
- Senate of the Philippines; 20th Congress

History
- New session started: July 28, 2025

Leadership
- Chair: Kiko Pangilinan, (Liberal) since September 10, 2025

Structure
- Seats: 9
- Political groups: Majority (6): Akbayan (1); KANP (1); Lakas (1); Liberal (1); Nacionalista (1); NPC (1); Minority (3): PDP (1); Independent (2)

The Philippine Senate Committee on Justice and Human Rights is a standing committee of the Senate of the Philippines.

== Jurisdiction ==
According to the Rules of the Senate, the committee handles all matters relating to:

- The organization and administration of justice, civil courts, penitentiaries and reformatory schools
- Probation
- Impeachment proceedings against constitutional officers and other officers legally removable by impeachment
- Registration of land titles
- Immigration and naturalization
- The implementation of the provisions of the Constitution on human rights
- The Department of Justice
- The Bureau of Corrections
- The National Bureau of Investigation
- The Commission on Human Rights
- The Land Registration Authority
- The Bureau of Immigration
- All matters pertaining to the efficiency and reforms in the prosecution service

== Members, 20th Congress ==
Based on the Rules of the Senate, the Senate Committee on Justice has 9 members.

The committee chairperson also sits at the Judicial and Bar Council as an ex officio member from July 1 to December 31 of each calendar year, as part of an arrangement with the House of Representatives Committee on Justice.

| Position | Member | Party |
|---|---|---|
| Chairperson | Kiko Pangilinan | Liberal |
| Vice Chairperson | Pia Cayetano | Nacionalista |
| Deputy Majority Leaders | JV Ejercito | NPC |
| Deputy Majority Leaders | Risa Hontiveros | Akbayan |
| Members for the Majority | Bam Aquino | KANP |
| Members for the Majority | Erwin Tulfo | Lakas |
| Deputy Minority Leaders | Rodante Marcoleta | Independent |
| Deputy Minority Leaders | Joel Villanueva | Independent |
| Member for the Minority | Bong Go | PDP |

Ex officio members:

- Senate President pro tempore Panfilo Lacson
- Majority Floor Leader Juan Miguel Zubiri
- Minority Floor Leader Alan Peter Cayetano

Committee secretary: Andrè B. Mortel

== Historical membership rosters ==
=== 19th Congress ===
| Position | Member | Party |
|---|---|---|
| Chairperson | Koko Pimentel | Nacionalista |
| Vice Chairperson | Raffy Tulfo | Independent |
| Members for the Majority | JV Ejercito | NPC |
| Members for the Majority | Mark Villar | Nacionalista |
| Members for the Majority | Ronald dela Rosa | PDP |
| Members for the Majority | Bong Go | PDP |
| Members for the Majority | Loren Legarda | NPC |
| Members for the Majority | Robin Padilla | PDP |
| Member for the Minority | Risa Hontiveros | Akbayan |

Committee secretary: Atty. Andrè B. Mortel

== See also ==
- List of Philippine Senate committees
