= Ducielle Cardema =

Filipino politician (born 1990)

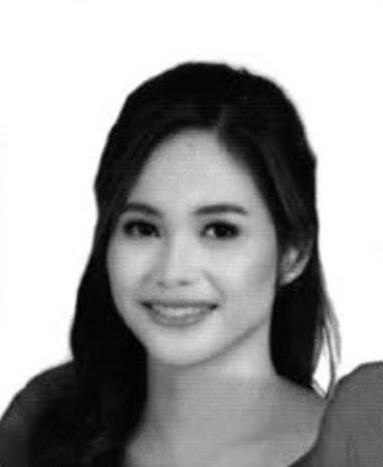
- Cardema's certificate of candidacy photo in 2024

Member of the Philippine House of Representatives for the Duterte Youth
- De facto
- In office October 13, 2020 – June 30, 2022

Personal details
- Born: Ducielle Marie Doctor Suarez; September 20, 1990 (age 36)
- Party: Nacionalista; Duterte Youth (party-list)
- Spouse: Ronald Cardema
- Relatives: Drixie Mae Cardema (sister)
- Occupation: Politician

Ducielle Marie Suarez Cardema (born Ducielle Marie Doctor Suarez born September 20, 1990) is a Filipino politician. She has served as the representative for Duterte Youth from 2020 to 2022.

Her career in the House of Representative is marked by initiatives to counter the New People's Army rebellion with Cardema often alleged to have committed red-tagging on groups suspected to be sympathetic to the communist rebels.

== Political career ==
=== Duterte Youth representative (2020–2022) ===
The Duterte Youth won a seat as partylist organization in the 2019 election. Her husband Ronald Cardema attempting to fill the seat after Ducielle and three other nominees supposedly withdrew. However as youth organizations are required to be 25 to 30 years old at election day, her then-34 year old husband was disqualified. Ducielle Cardema, the original first nominee was eventually allowed to take oath.

On October 13, 2020, Ducielle Cardema was took a seat for Duterte Youth in the House of Representatives until June 2022.

As a congresswoman, Cardema focused on fighting the New People's Army rebellion and was accused of committing red-tagging, alleging groups of association with communist rebels. She has also sought to revive the Anti-Subversion Act of 1957, through House Bill 8231 which would ban again the triumviate of the Communist Party of the Philippines, New People's Army and the National Democratic Front and includes provisions for livelihood aid for communist rebels who wished to be reintegrated to mainstream society.

=== 2025 Calamba councilor bid ===
In 2025 elections, Cardema ran for councilor in Calamba but she lost.

== Personal life ==
Ducielle Cardema is married to Ronald Cardema. She is the sister of Drixie Mae Cardema, the former representative of Duterte Youth from 2022 to 2025. Drixie Mae publicly took the surname of Ducielle's husband.
