= Political positions of Rodrigo Duterte =

Views of the Philippine president on organized society

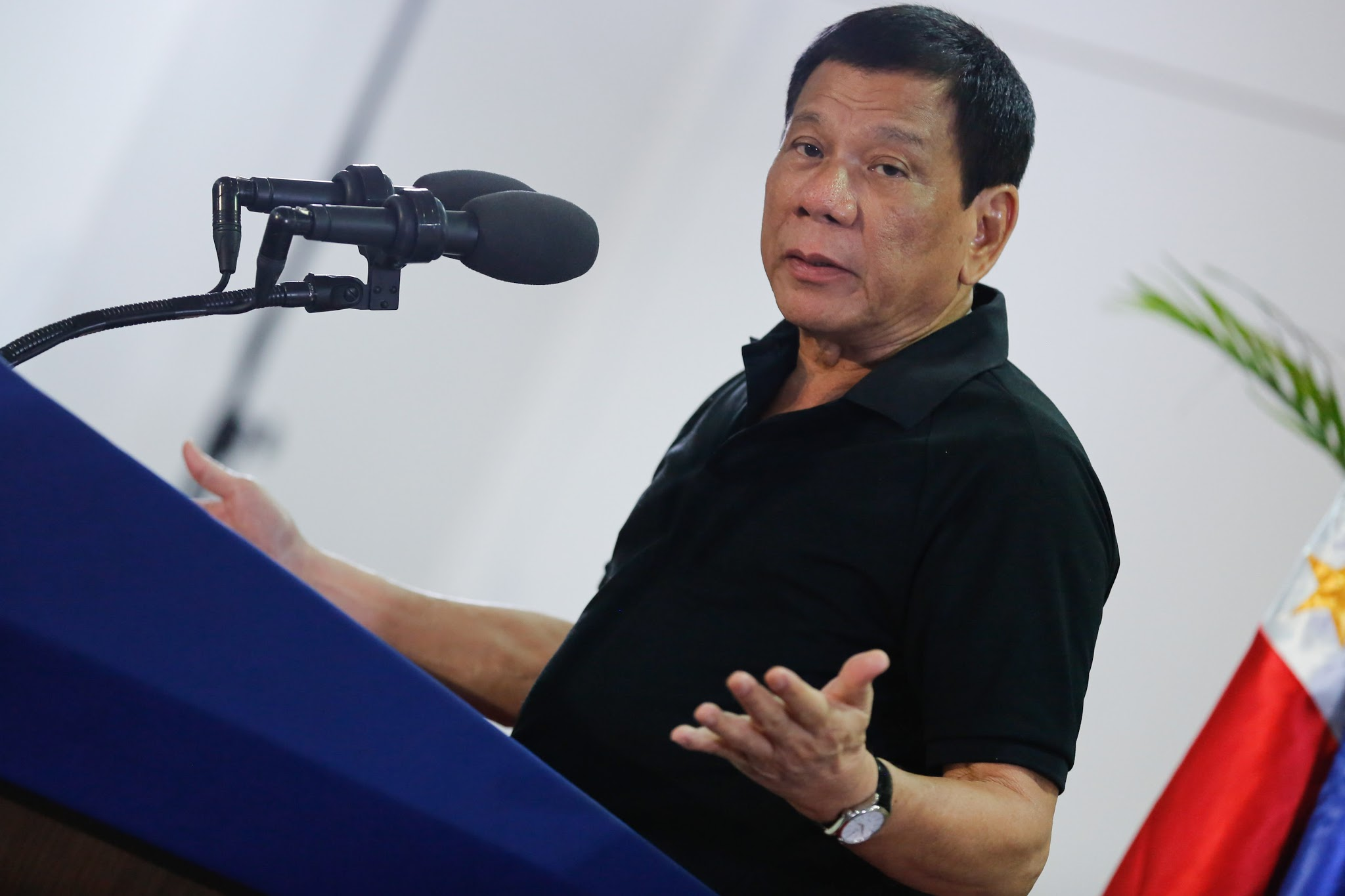
Rodrigo Duterte speaking in Davao City on September 30, 2016

The political positions of Rodrigo Duterte, the 16th President of the Philippines, have been difficult to define coherently into what some analysts have attempted to package as Dutertismo due to numerous policy shifts during his presidency.

== Ideology ==
Duterte's political party, PDP-Laban, describes itself as a democratic socialist party, and Duterte has nominally identified as a socialist, making appeals to left-leaning sectors. He has also stressed that he was not a communist. He was once a member of the national democratic Kabataang Makabayan during the 1970s, and was himself a student of José María Sison, founder of the Communist Party of the Philippines (CPP). Earlier in his presidency, he had shown favor to the left in a series of speeches: on one occasion he proclaimed himself as the first "leftist President"; called the CPP a "revolutionary government"; ordered his officials to file petitions in court for the release of about 20 jailed communist leaders, which led to their subsequent release; and appointed several cabinet members from the CPP.

The collapse of the peace talks with the CPP, New People's Army (NPA) and NDF led to the falling-out between Duterte and the CPP. The dismissal of cabinet members, most of whom were dropped by the Commission on Appointments or by Duterte himself, led to his erstwhile progressive allies disowning him. Some in the mainstream news media have labeled Duterte as a right-wing populist and authoritarian. He has been likened to other nationalist figures in the 2010s including Donald Trump and Jair Bolsonaro. The fallout between Duterte and the CPP has also been followed by the expansion of a historical and religiously informed cultural hostility toward left-wing politics in the Philippines, which had been previously reserved for the CPP but which has now spread to the social democratic, democratic socialist and national democratic organizations, such as the Makabayan bloc. Some national democrats and others who identify with the left have refuted Duterte's self-proclaimed socialist credentials given his inability to concretely and seriously tackle the economic aspects of liberalism.

Duterte is the first Philippine president to have had "no reservations" in openly declaring his socialism while operating within a hostile political-economic environment. Some analysts have, in turn, stressed that Duterte's declaration should be seen as part of a populist political strategy rather than a statement of ideological alignment.

== Social policy ==
=== Abortion and contraception issues ===
Duterte does not believe that contraception is inherently morally wrong and advocates for government-promoted efforts to expand access to contraceptive services. He wishes to maintain laws against abortion in the Philippines, arguing that abortion involves the taking of a sovereign human life.

=== Conditional cash transfers ===
Duterte vowed a continuation of the Pantawid Pamilyang Pilipino Program, a conditional cash transfer program started by the administration of Gloria Macapagal Arroyo.

=== Capital punishment ===
During the 2016 election, Duterte campaigned to restore the death penalty in the Philippines. Duterte reportedly supported capital punishment for criminals involved in drug trafficking and use, gun-for-hire syndicates and those who commit "heinous crimes" such as rape, murder, and robbery. Duterte has vowed "to litter Manila Bay with the bodies of criminals."

=== LGBT rights ===
In February 2016, Duterte criticized boxer Manny Pacquiao after the latter's controversial comments about LGBT couples being "worse than animals", stating that the boxer did not have the right to judge others in such a manner. Duterte has also advocated in support of anti-discrimination measures to protect LGBT individuals in his capacity as a mayor. He has remarked that, in his view, "the universe is ruled by the law of a God who is forgiving, merciful, compassionate and loving, the same God who created all of us equal."

In terms of the legalization of same-sex marriage, Duterte stated in January 2016 that he feels sympathetic to LGBT people on the issue while still believing that he should not push against the current legal code of the Philippines. He noted that law depicts the matter in terms of religious doctrine and intermingles secular marriage with sacramental holy matrimony, which traditionally is only between one man and one woman. He stressed his feelings of affection for his LGBT friends and family members though indicating his agreement with traditions. Duterte has stated that he used to be gay, but was "cured" of his homosexuality when he met his wife, Elizabeth.

In March 2017, Duterte stated his opposition on same-sex marriage and retracted his support for civil unions, believing in the Civil Code of the Philippines that states marriage is between a man and a woman only. He recognized differences between the Filipino and Western cultures regarding same-sex unions and criticized attempts by the latter to impose the culture on the former, saying that the Filipino culture is based on Catholic teachings as the Philippines is a Catholic-majority country and the Catholic church is considered to be as de facto state religion in the Philippines. In December 2017, however, he expressed support for same-sex marriage but said that the Civil Code will have to be changed. In October 2020, after Pope Francis expressed support for same-sex civil unions, Duterte's spokesman Harry Roque said that the president had long supported civil unions, and that "even the most conservative of all Catholics in Congress should no longer have a basis for objecting" to them after the Pope's endorsement.

=== Public order ===
Duterte believes that an efficient and effective military and police is the most important part of the nation's security. To aid in this goal, he plans to increase the salary of the military and police to give them dignity and dissuade them from bribe-taking.

== Economic policy ==
=== Labor policy ===
Duterte is against labor contractualization and has said that he would like to end the said practice. He has said that, in the long term, the policy destroys the country's work force and sows instability due to lack of job security. However, in 2019 Duterte vetoed a law banning labor contractualization echoing arguments of big business groups saying that businesses should be able to determine which jobs should be outsourced.

=== Industrialization ===
To create jobs, Duterte proposes to build/rebuild industries and their factories. In particular, he believes the most important step towards industrialization is to revive the Philippine steel industry, which are mostly based in Duterte's home island of Mindanao.

=== Comprehensive Agrarian Reform Program ===
Duterte opposes any move to amend the Constitution of the Philippines to allow foreigners to own lands in the country.

=== Taxation ===
Duterte has said that a monthly income of 25,000 Php or less should be exempted from paying income taxes. A simplified tax collection system and privatization of the Bureau of Internal Revenue and other government collection agencies are also among his proposals. However, Duterte has also said he is against income tax reduction.

=== Foreign investments ===
Duterte proposes the creation of designating “business islands” as economic zones to encourage foreign investment and create jobs. To aid in attracting investors, he wants to make "simple and believable" economic policies and laws.

=== Mining policy ===
Due to social costs to communities and risks to the environment, Duterte is against mining operations. However, he did not intervene in the confirmation process of Gina Lopez, despite the majority of members of the Commission of Appointments was from PDP–Laban, including his former vice presidential running mate, leading to speculations of a change of stance on mining. In late 2017, Duterte confirmed that he will let mining continue in the Philippines, sparking outrage from environmental groups which supported his presidential candidacy.

=== Tourism ===
Duterte proposes the creation of additional tourism estates in Cebu and in the whole Central Visayas region that bring more job opportunities for Filipinos. He also plans to transfer the main office of the Department of Tourism from Intramuros, Manila to Cebu. In late 2017, he told media that he wants the metropolitan capital, Metro Manila, to become a barren landscape so that tourists will go elsewhere.

=== Federalism ===
Duterte advocates federalism as a better system of governance for the Philippines. He argues that regions outside Metro Manila receive unfairly small budgets from the Internal Revenue Allotment. For example, of the ₱5 billion Davao sends monthly to Metro Manila, only 2 or 3 billion ever returns. He also highlights that money remitted to national government is misused by corrupt politicians in the Philippine Congress. However, Duterte said to Muslim leaders in July 2016 that if the majority of Filipinos are against the proposal of federalism, he will push for the Bangsamoro Basic Law, in which only Bangsamoro would become autonomous. He would also revise the law in such a way that the Moro National Liberation Front would receive the same deal as the Moro Islamic Liberation Front.

== Foreign policy ==
=== Chinese activities in the Spratly Islands ===
Duterte has said he is open to bilateral talks with China when it comes to the maritime dispute centered on the Chinese claim to the Spratly Islands. He is supportive of the Philippines' arbitration case against China at the Permanent Court of Arbitration, but has said that a non-confrontational and less formal approach to China would be more effective in coming to an agreement. He has also said that the Philippines should revert to the previous position to agree to explore jointly the disputed areas with other countries like China, Vietnam, Malaysia, Brunei and Taiwan for resources such as oil, gas and other minerals. In January 2018, he approved the Chinese government's activities in the West Philippine Sea and the Philippine Rise, which a United Nations tribunal has handed down legally to the Philippines. Duterte also accepted the conditions of China to explore the seas of the Philippines, such as that the majority of experts of the exploration should always be Chinese and that the equipment to be used are from China and never from the Philippines.

In June 2016, Duterte imposed a different policy towards China. In January 2018, Filipino Representative Gary Alejano of the Magdalo Partylist revealed that Secretary Alan Peter Cayetano of the Department of Foreign Affairs had approved the Chinese Institute of Oceanology of the Chinese Academy of Sciences to perform a scientific survey of the Rise, with the approval of President Rodrigo Duterte. Duterte's spokesperson, Harry Roque, later confirmed Alejano's revelation, and said that Filipinos have no capability to research the Rise. Massive backlash surged as numerous Filipino research proofs from university professors and researchers were leaked. In February, Duterte's agriculture secretary told media that Duterte has now ordered the halting of all foreign researches in the Philippines Rise, however, the research being conducted by the Chinese Academy of Sciences was already finished before the halt order. Afterwards, confirmed reports broke out, stating that the International Hydrographic Organization (IHO) and the Intergovernmental Oceanographic Commission (IOC) of the UNESCO have rules wherein the entity that first discovers unnamed features underwater have the right to name those features, prompting Filipino officials to realize that China was after, not just research, but also the naming rights over the underwater features of the Philippine Rise which will be internationally recognized through UNESCO. A CSIS expert concluded that the current Philippine government is 'well-intentioned but naive'. A few days after the research halt ordered by Duterte, it was clarified by the Philippine government that all researches ongoing at the time the halting was made were officially cancelled, but the government still fully allows research activities in the Rise after the halting. Foreign researchers, including Chinese, may still do research within the Rise if they apply for research activities through the Philippine government. Due to this clarification, rallies surged in Philippine metropolitan streets. Duterte later insisted, in a bid to disperse public anxiety, that the Rise belongs to the Philippines. February 12, 2018, the International Hydrographic Organization approved the names proposed by China for five features in the Philippine Rise after China submitted to the organization its research findings on the area. The names given by China were all in Chinese, namely, Jinghao Seamount (some 70 nautical miles east of Cagayan), Tianbao Seamount (some 70 nautical miles east of Cagayan), Haidonquing Seamount (east at 190 nautical miles), Cuiqiao Hill, and Jujiu Seamount, the last two form the central peaks of the Philippine Rise undersea geological province. The Chinese naming of the features met public protests in the Philippines, however, the Philippine government itself chose to impose a bystander policy, enlarging public anxiety towards the Duterte regime's buddy-buddy policy towards China.

=== Visiting Forces Agreement with the United States ===
Duterte has said that if Filipinos could not get their fair share in the justice system with the Visiting Forces Agreement and Enhanced Defense Cooperation Agreement, signed between the governments of the Philippines and the United States in 2014, then these agreements should be revoked. In January 2018, he did not comment on the agreement after being asked by media about the VFA's current status.

=== Trans-Pacific Partnership ===
In a speech in December 2016, Duterte opposed joining the Trans-Pacific Partnership, saying it would affect developing countries like the Philippines in accessing affordable generic drugs. He also praised United States President Donald Trump's intention for the U.S. to cancel the deal generated by the previous Barack Obama administration.

== Miscellaneous ==
=== Ferdinand Marcos' burial at the Libingan ng mga Bayani ===
Despite the controversy surrounding his intention to make good his campaign promise to Ilocanos to allow the transfer of the body of the late president Ferdinand Marcos, the 10th President of the Philippines, from the former President's home province to the Libingan ng mga Bayani in Taguig, Duterte has instructed that the burial be made immediately.

== See also ==
- Dutertismo
- Philippine drug war
- Burial of Ferdinand Marcos
