= Amina Rasul =

Filipina Muslim advocate and columnist

Chairperson of the National Youth Commission for Mindanao
- In office 1995–1998
- Succeeded by: Cesar Chavez

Personal details
- Born: Amina Zalmia Tillah Rasul; April 5, 1954 (age 72) Jolo, Sulu, Philippines
- Party: KNP (2004)
- Education: University of the Philippines Diliman (BEcon); Asian Institute of Management (MBA); Harvard University (MPA)
- Occupation: Muslim rights advocate
- Profession: Columnist

Amina Zalmia Tillah Rasul–Bernardo (born April 5, 1954) is a Filipina columnist and Muslim rights advocate. She is the daughter of first Filipina Muslim Senator Nina Rasul.

== Education ==
Rasul graduated from the University of the Philippines with a bachelor’s degree in economics. She also studied Master of Business Administration from the Asian Institute of Management, and a master’s in public administration from Harvard’s Kennedy School of Government.

== Career ==
In 1995, she held a position in the Philippine cabinet under former president Fidel V. Ramos, where she worked as the presidential advisor on Youth Affairs and was also the inaugural chairperson of the National Youth Commission (NYC), which she established.

Furthermore, she has been a commissioner of the National Commission on the Role of Filipino Women, where she represented the Muslim community; served as a board member for the Philippine National Oil Corporation (PNOC) and the Development Bank of the Philippines (DBP); and was the founding director of the Local Government Guarantee Corporation (LGGC). Additionally, she co-founded Women in International Security (Philippines) and Muslim Women Peace Advocates (Sulu). In 2007, she was honored with the Muslim Democrat of the Year Award by the Washington, DC-based Center for the Study of Islam and Democracy (CSID).

A prominent advocate for peace and human rights, Amina Rasul Bernardo serves as the president of the Philippine Center for Islam & Democracy (PCID), and the managing trustee of the Magbassa Kita Foundation, Inc. (MKFI), which focuses on promoting literacy for peace and development among adult learners. She is also a member of the Board of Regents at Mindanao State University (MSU) and a board member of the Mindanao Development Authority (MinDA).

Additionally, she participates as a member of the National Independent Advisory & Monitoring Committee (NIAMC) for the Department of Social Welfare & Development’s Conditional Cash Transfer Program, and she contributes to the General Advisory Council of the Criminal Investigation & Detection Group (CIDG). Furthermore, she holds a position as a trustee on the board of the Ramon Magsaysay Award Foundation. She is a Ramon Magsaysay Award Foundation Board of Trustee.

She also serves as a columnist for BusinessWorld, where she has written & edited several books and literatures related on the wars and conflicts in Mindanao, Islam, and democracy such as Broken Peace? Assessing the 1996 GRP-MNLF Final Peace Agreement and The Radicalization of Muslim Communities in Southeast Asia. She also the launching editor of The Moro Times, a monthly supplement of The Manila Times.

== Awards ==
Rasul received awards for being an internationally recognized peace advocate, being named by Jordan’s Royal Islamic Strategic Studies Center as one of the world’s 500 most influential Muslims this year. She also won N-Peace Award of the United Nations Development Programme in 2019, and received recognition as the 2007 Muslim Democrat of the Year by the Center for the Study of Islam and Democracy in Washington DC. In 2023, she also received Intercultural Achievement Award by the Austrian Federal Ministry for European and International Affairs.

== Political career ==
She ran as senator under Fernando Poe Jr.'s Koalisyon ng Nagkakaisang Pilipino in 2004 elections, but lost. While campaigning as senator, she accused the incumbent President Arroyo (Poe's rival) of using funds while campaigning that time and petitioned to Supreme Court to declare the latter as resigned, but the Supreme Court dismissed her petition.

== Personal life ==
She is the wife of Monetary Board member Romy Bernardo.
