= Drixie Mae Cardema =

Filipino politician

Drixie Mae Suarez
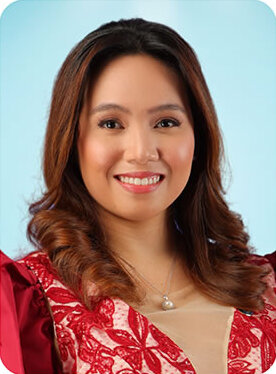
- Official portrait, 2022

Member of the Philippine House of Representatives for the Duterte Youth
- De facto
- In office June 30, 2022 – June 30, 2025

Personal details
- Born: Drixie Mae Doctor Suarez; August 28, 1996 (age 29) Quezon City, Philippines
- Party: Duterte Youth (party-list)
- Spouse: None
- Relatives: Ronald Cardema (brother-in-law)
- Occupation: Politician

Drixie Mae Suarez Cardema (born Drixie Mae Doctor Suarez; August 28, 1996) is a Filipino politician who has served as the representative for Duterte Youth since 2022.

== Early life and education ==
Drixie Mae Suarez was born on August 28, 1996, in Quezon City, Philippines. She attended Mater Carmeli School in Quezon City for her high school education. She then attended the University of the Philippines Extension Program in Angeles City and graduated in 2017.

== House of Representatives (2022–present) ==
Cardema took her oath of office on May 30, 2022, becoming a Representative through the Duterte Youth Party-List, which secured a seat in the 2022 Philippine general election. As the first nominee of the party list, she succeeded to the position following the party's electoral victory.

In July 2022, Cardema filed a House resolution seeking to revert the name of the Ninoy Aquino International Airport to Manila International Airport, insisting that the name of the airport should not be "politicized". The airport is named after Benigno Aquino Jr., a critic of then-resident Ferdinand Marcos who was assassinated at the airport.

In August 2023, Cardema advocated for a larger budget allocation for the Supreme Court, requesting ₱72 billion for the judiciary branch.

In September 2024, Cardema was among the lawmakers who filed a bill seeking to restore the death penalty in the Philippines. The proposed legislation aimed to reimpose capital punishment for certain heinous crimes, continuing a controversial policy position supported by former President Rodrigo Duterte during his administration.

In November 2024, Cardema made headlines when veteran lawmakers had to correct her during a congressional hearing. The incident highlighted tensions between established legislative members and representatives from newer political groups like Duterte Youth.

Also in November 2024, Cardema publicly questioned the Constitutional Commission's criticism of political leaders, defending what she referred to as "the two most trusted leaders of the country." Her statement reflected the continued political divisions in Philippine politics following the Duterte administration.

== Political positions ==
Cardema has positioned herself as a supporter of former President Rodrigo Duterte's policies, including advocacy for controversial measures such as capital punishment. As a member of Duterte Youth, she has advocated for causes aligned with the former president's political agenda.

== Personal life ==
Drixie Cardema is sometimes confused with Ducielle Cardema, who is her sister, the former representative of Duterte Youth from 2019 to 2022, and wife of Ronald Cardema, who was the initial nominee in 2019 but was disqualified due to being overaged. Drixie Mae is single. Nevertheless Drixie publicly uses her brother-in-law's surname of Cardema.

In the lead up to the 20th Congress, the surname usage was scrutinized noting the discrepancies of her full name in her certificate of acceptance of nomination with the Duterte Youth and her voter's registration. Ronald Cardema has defended the use stating "Drixie Mae Cardema" is her "political name" for name recall. Tonyo Cruz of the Manila Bulletin said that she may be sued for material misrepresentation in misleading the public.
