= National Youth Commission (Philippines) =

Philippine government agency

- Pambansang Komisyon sa Kabataan
- NYC logo

Agency overview
- Formed: August 22, 1995
- Jurisdiction: Government of the Philippines
- Headquarters: 3rd Floor West Insula Building, West Avenue, Quezon City, Metro Manila, Philippines
- Employees: 99 (2024)
- Annual budget: ₱156.65 million (2023)
- Agency executives: Joseph Francisco R. Ortega, Chairman; Leah T. Villalon, Executive Director
- Parent agency: Department of the Interior and Local Government
- Website: www.nyc.gov.ph

The National Youth Commission (NYC; Filipino: Pambansang Komisyon sa Kabataan) is a government agency in the Philippines that specifically addresses issues surrounding the Filipino youth. It was founded on August 22, 1995, via Republic Act 8044 or the "Youth in Nation-Building Act of 1995".

The NYC is the Philippine government's sole policy-making body on youth affairs, but also coordinates and implements programs designed to respond to and raise awareness on youth issues. Its mandate is enshrined in the 1987 Philippine Constitution: "The State recognizes the vital role of the youth in nation-building and shall promote and protect their physical, moral, spiritual, intellectual and social well-being. It shall inculcate in the youth patriotism and nationalism; and encourage their involvement in public and civic affairs."

== History ==
During the Marcos administration, government supervision on youth affairs fell under the Kabataang Barangay National Secretariat, the Youth Development Affairs, and the Secretariat on Youth Affairs. Under the Cory Aquino administration, these were abolished and functions were carried over to the Presidential Council for Youth Affairs (PCYA).

The NYC was founded on August 22, 1995, through Republic Act 8044 or the "Youth in Nation-Building Act of 1995", mandating it to be the "policy-making coordinating body of all youth-related institutions, programs, projects and activities of the government."

On July 4, 2016, NYC was among the 12 agencies, formerly from the Office of the President reassigned to the Office of the Cabinet Secretary, based on Executive Order #1 issued by President Rodrigo Duterte. On October 31, 2018, the Commission, through Executive Order No. 67, was transferred to the Department of the Interior and Local Government along with the National Commission on Muslim Filipinos and the Philippine Commission on Women as part of the reorganization of the Office of the Cabinet Secretary.

== Mandate ==
The agency's mandates are specified under RA 8044 ("Youth in Nation-Building Act of 1995") and RA 10742 ("SK Reform Act of 2015").

=== National Youth Parliament ===
The agency convenes the National Youth Parliament (NYP) every two years. The NYP is a 3-day convention of youth leaders wherein policy recommendations are formulated to address youth issues, and serve as the government's guide in policy formulation and program development. Started in 1996, youth leaders gather every two years to share ideas and gain valuable insights and networks to aid them in their youth development efforts. The most recent parliament was held last November 2025 in Vigan City, Ilocos Sur to discuss the policies that affects youth and calling an anti-corruption efforts in the government.

=== Sangguniang Kabataan ===
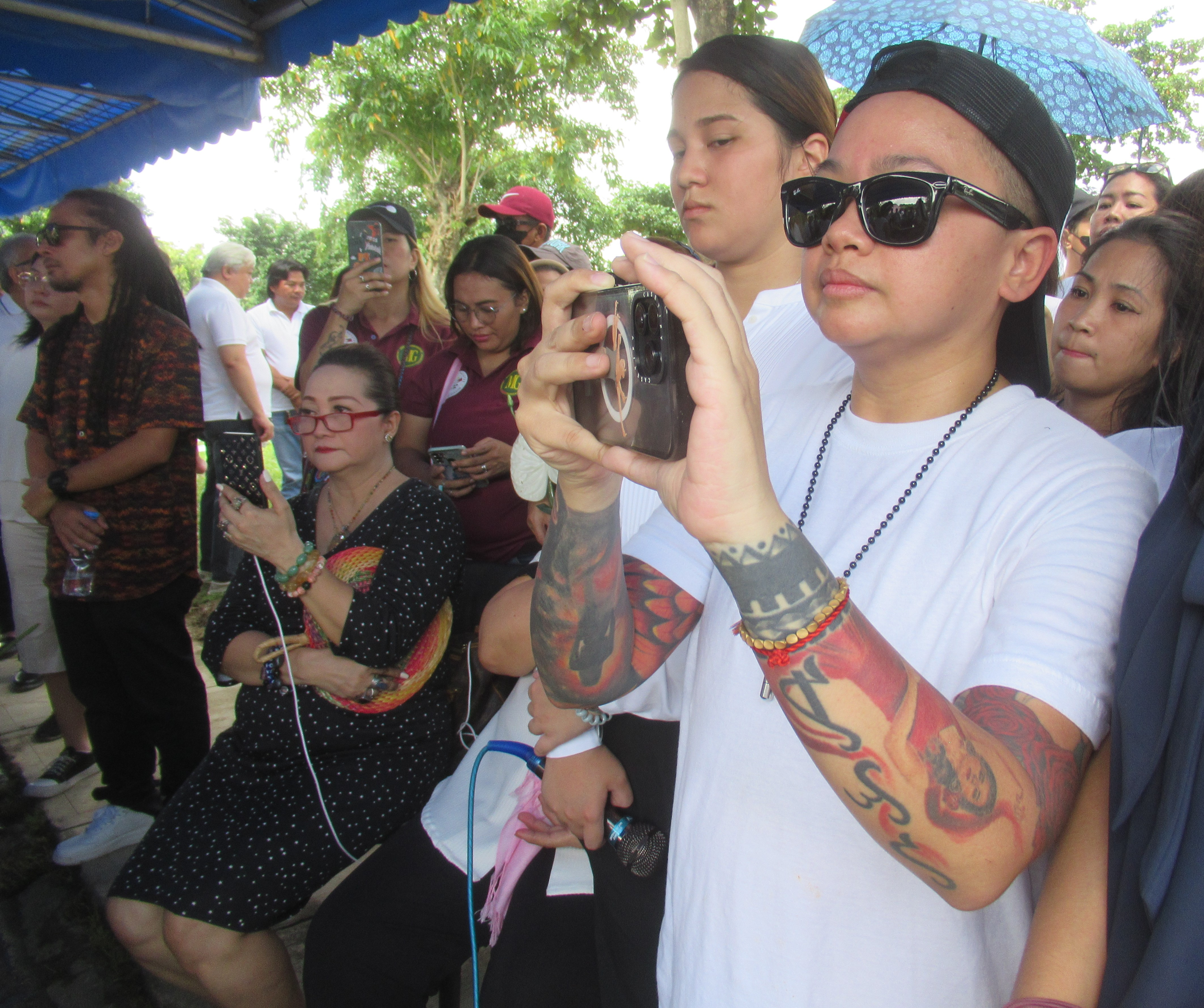
Chairperson Ice Seguerra, 2016-2018

The agency serves as the National Secretariat of the Sangguniang Kabataan (SK), local youth councils in the Philippines. The agency conducts mandatory continuing program for elected SK officials and coordinates with relevant government agencies for policies involving the SK and Local Youth Development Offices. In coordination with various youth groups, the agency spearheaded efforts for the passage of RA 10742 in 2018.

=== Youth Development Program ===
The agency is mandated to formulate, approve, and implement Medium-Term Youth Development Program (MTYDP) every three years. Currently, the MTYDP in place is called the Philippine Youth Development Plan for 2017-2022. It is also mandated to conduct a study on the situation of the youth sector every three years to identify priority needs, prevailing attitudes, and gaps in service delivery. Its most recent study is entitled the National Youth Assessment Study (NYAS) conducted in 2015.

=== Youth Organizations & Volunteer Program ===
The agency contributes to the development and proliferation of youth organizations in the country. The agency's Youth Organization Registration Program (YORP) was launched to register, help, and facilitate the establishment of youth organizations and youth-serving organizations.

The agency also founded the Ten Accomplished Youth Organizations (TAYO) Awards, an annual search and recognition program for outstanding contributions made by youth and youth-serving organizations nationwide. Under the term of NYC Chairperson Ronald Cardema, the agency stopped sponsoring the award-giving program establish the "President Rodrigo Roa Duterte Youth Leadership Awards", which did not materialize.

The National Youth Volunteer Program, initially established to mobilize youth volunteers for the 2005 Southeast Asian Games, is now an ongoing platform for volunteer training and mobilization for various activities nationwide.

== Composition ==
The agency is headed by one Chairperson, three Commissioners representing Luzon, Visayas, and Mindanao, and two Commissioners-at-large. Its secretariat is headed by an Executive Director who concurrently serves as Chief Operation Officer. These officials serve for a term of three years, with reappointment for another term.

Officials of the National Youth Commission
Chairperson	Commissioners	From	To	Appointed by
Amina Rasul	Cesar B. Chavez; Jorge Bernardo Mitra; Celine Madamba; Jose Ribomapil Holganza; Koko Pimentel; Richard Alvin Nalupta; Anselmo Adriano (SK National Federation President)	1995	1998	Fidel V. Ramos
Cesar Chavez	Herbert C. Bautista; Evans Pino; Celine Madamba; Jorge Bernardo Mitra; Rudy Caneda	1998	2001	Joseph Estrada
Mabel Villarica Mamba JV Ejercito (Honorary Chairperson)	Richard Gomez; Alberto Munoz	2001	2001	Joseph Estrada
(Vacant)	Herbert Bautista; Evans Pino; Girlie Amarillo; Jimmy Yaokasin; Pendatun Disimba; Bam Aquino; Dennis Cunanan	2001	2003	Gloria Macapagal Arroyo
Bam Aquino	Richard Alvin Nalupta; Benjie Oliva; Marc Castrodes; Christopher Lawrence Arnuco; Joseph Ariel Arcillas; Araceli Aves; Dino Badilla	2003	2006	Gloria Macapagal Arroyo
Richard Alvin Nalupta	Priscilla Marie Abante- Barquia; Christopher Lawrence Arnuco; Ares Goyena; Milton Isagani Mendador; Jane Censoria Cajes; Benjie Oliva; Hany Camid; Raul Dominic Badilla; RJ Belmonte; Apolonio Maleniza; Mike Acebedo Lopez	2006	2008	Gloria Macapagal Arroyo
Christopher Lawrence Arnuco	Precilla Marie Abante; Steve Laurence Arquiza; Benjie Oliva; Jane Censoria Cajes; Gabriel Louise Del Rosario; Lesley Cordero; Earl Saavedra	2008	2011	Gloria Macapagal Arroyo
Leon Flores III	Erwin Andaya; Steve Laurence Arquiza; Percival Vilar Cendaña; Georgina Nava; Earl Pioquinto Saavedra; Gregorio Ramon "Gio" A. Tingson	2011	2014	Benigno C. Aquino III
Gregorio Ramon "Gio" A. Tingson	Percival Vilar Cendaña; Jose Rafael S. Cruz; Dingdong Dantes; JP Peñol; Earl Pioquinto Saavedra; Shierwin Taay	2014	2016	Benigno C. Aquino III
Cariza "Ice" Suguerra	Paul Anthony Pangilinan; James Cesar Ventura; Rhea Penaflor; Ronald Gian Carlo Cardema; Nielex Tupas	2016	2018	Rodrigo Duterte
Ronald Gian Carlo L. Cardema	Paul Anthony Pangilinan; James Cesar Ventura; Victor Del Rosario; Julius Gutierrez	2018	2019	Rodrigo Duterte
Ryan R. Enriquez	Laurence Diestro; James Cesar Ventura; Paul Anthony Pangilinan; Victor A. Del Rosario; Julius Gutierrez	2019	2022	Rodrigo Duterte
Ronald Gian Carlo L. Cardema	Laurence Anthony Diestro, Commissioner-at-Large; Robert Anthony Fanlo, Commissioner-at-Large; Reena Vivienne Pineda, Commissioner representing Luzon; Christine Joy Cari, Commissioner representing Visayas; Alexa Danielle Dayanghirang, Commissioner representing Mindanao; Bianca Patrice Go, Commissioner representing Mindanao (as of March 25, 2024); Carol Julienne Dalipe, SK National Representative; Leah Villalon, Executive Director and COO	2022	2024	Bongbong Marcos
Joseph Francisco R. Ortega	Michelle Mae B. Gonzales, Commissioner-at-Large; Karl Josef F. Legazpi, Commissioner-at-Large; Gervy James Gumarit, Commissioner-at-Large; Michael Christophe Agustin, Commissioner Representing Luzon; Juanquine Racho, Commissioner Representing Visayas; Bianca Patrice Go, Commissioner Representing Mindanao; Carl Vincent Quitoriano, Executive Director and COO	2024	2027	Bongbong Marcos

== Controversies ==
=== Electioneering in the 12th National Youth Parliament ===
In October 2018, the 12th National Youth Parliament held in Davao City was met by a series of controversies. First, then-NYC Chairperson Ronald Cardema was criticized for openly accusing youth groups Kabataan Partylist and Anakbayan as communist recruiters during the program's orientation.

On the first day of the event, the program was suspended to accommodate then-senatorial candidate Bong Go, who discussed his campaign platform and invited delegates to support his campaign. Delegates were asked to do the "Duterte fist-pump" pose during a photo opportunity, while SK Federation Presidents were invited to celebrate with Go in the evening. In response, delegates passed a resolution barring politicians from using the event for political campaigns. Likewise, various youth groups and alumni of the parliament released statements criticizing the agency. In a Facebook post, Go denied allegations that he attended the event for his political campaign.

=== NYC Employees Association controversy ===
On March 23, 2020, the agency released a statement addressed to Senate President Tito Sotto, manifesting its support for the immediate passage of a legislative measure granting additional powers to President Rodrigo Duterte for COVID-19 response. This was met by criticism from youth and civil society groups as the initial bill contained provisions deemed unconstitutional. The agency's employees association called NYCEA released a statement clarifying that the statement did not go through any form of consultation with youth stakeholders or other NYC officials. In response, NYC Chairperson Enriquez threatened the NYCEA Board with disciplinary action for misconduct and insubordination as stated in the NYC Memorandum dated March 31, 2020 and April 13, 2020.

In June 2020, the agency's employees association sent a letter addressed to President Rodrigo Duterte citing NYC Chairperson Enriquez's "abuse and usurpation of authority, violation of security of tenure, and harassment". In support, more than 120 SK chapters and youth groups released a statement calling for the Enriquez' resignation for "failure to release statements or action points to address pressing issues faced by the youth sector [amid the COVID-19 pandemic]" and for using the agency's social media accounts to release support towards the proposed Anti-Terrorism Bill. Neither Enriquez nor the Office of the President responded to the issues.

=== Fund misuse ===
In an audit report released in 2022, the Commission on Audit flagged the NYC under Ronaldo Cardema for illegally diverting up to P2.714 million in 2021 to support the National Task Force to End Local Communist Armed Conflict. The funds were meant for the training of youth leaders under the Sangguniang Kabataan Mandatory and Continuing Training Fund and Marawi City rehabilitation efforts through Task Force Bangon Marawi.
