= Task Force Bangon Marawi =

Defunct agency of the Philippine government

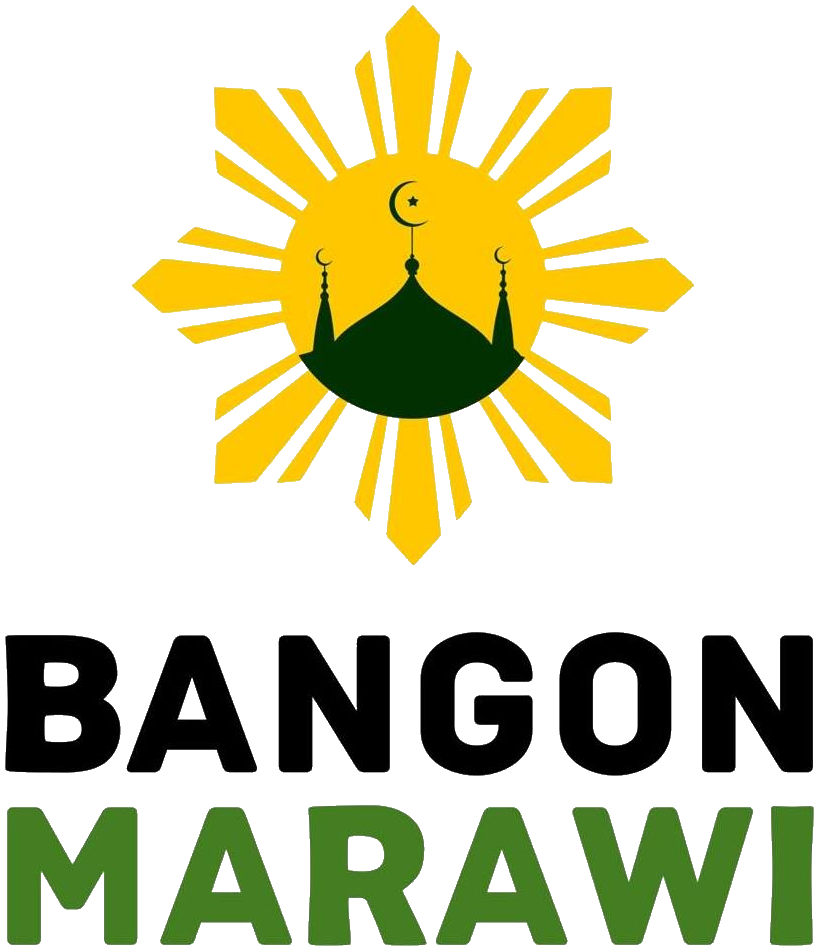

Agency overview
- Formed: June 28, 2017
- Dissolved: December 22, 2023
- Jurisdiction: Marawi, Lanao del Sur, Philippines
- Agency executives: Eduardo del Rosario, Chairman; Delfin Lorenzana, Vice-chairman; Mark Villar, Vice-chairman

Task Force Bangon Marawi (transl. Task Force Rise Up Marawi) was a government inter-agency task force group organized by President Rodrigo Duterte in June 2017 to facilitate the rehabilitation, recovery and reconstruction efforts in Marawi after the battle between ISIL-linked militants and government forces in the city left the locality in ruins. The agency was abolished by Duterte's successor, President Bongbong Marcos on December 22, 2023.

== History ==
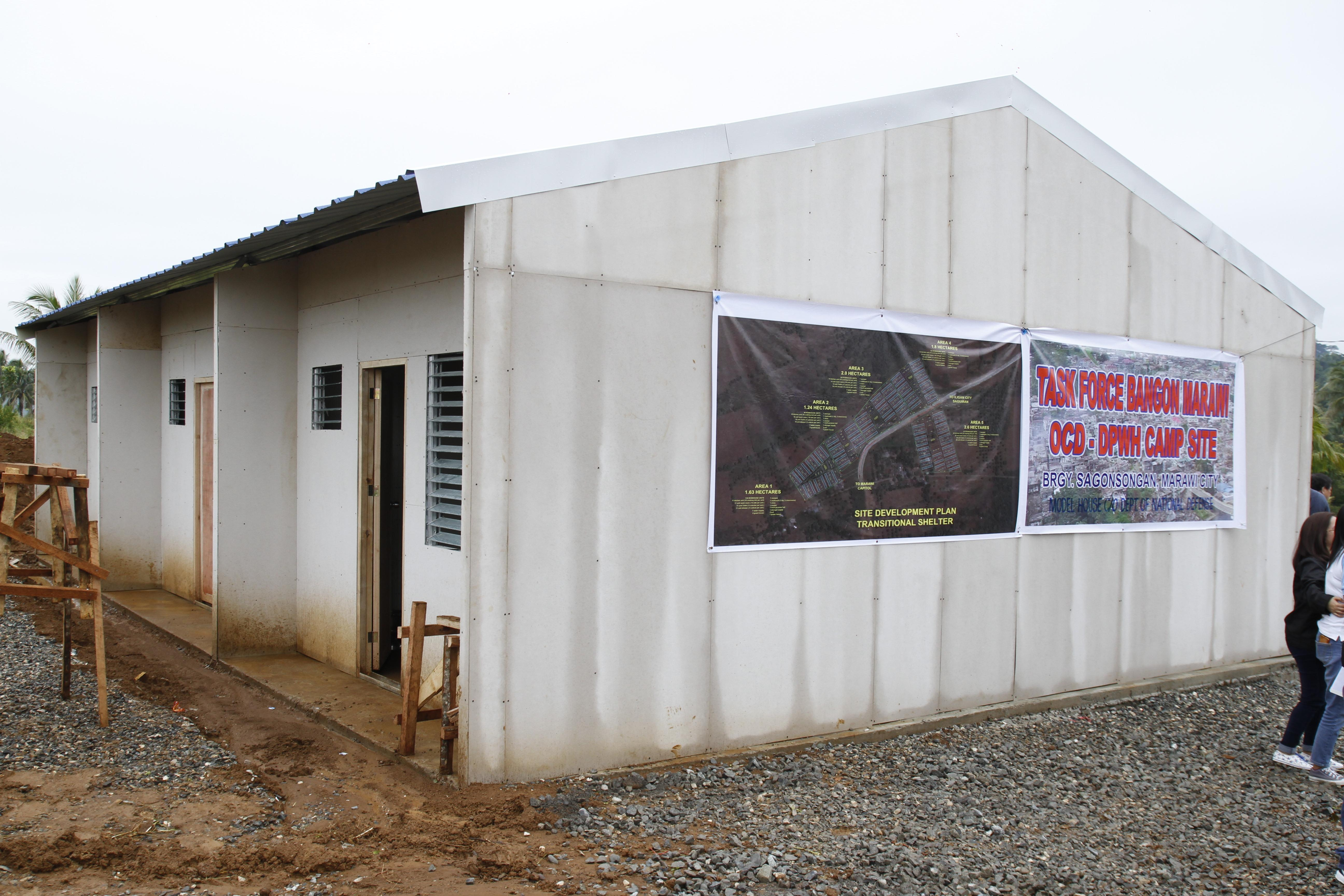
One of the temporary houses at the Barangay Sagonsongan Transitional Shelter for affected Marawi residents set up by the task force.

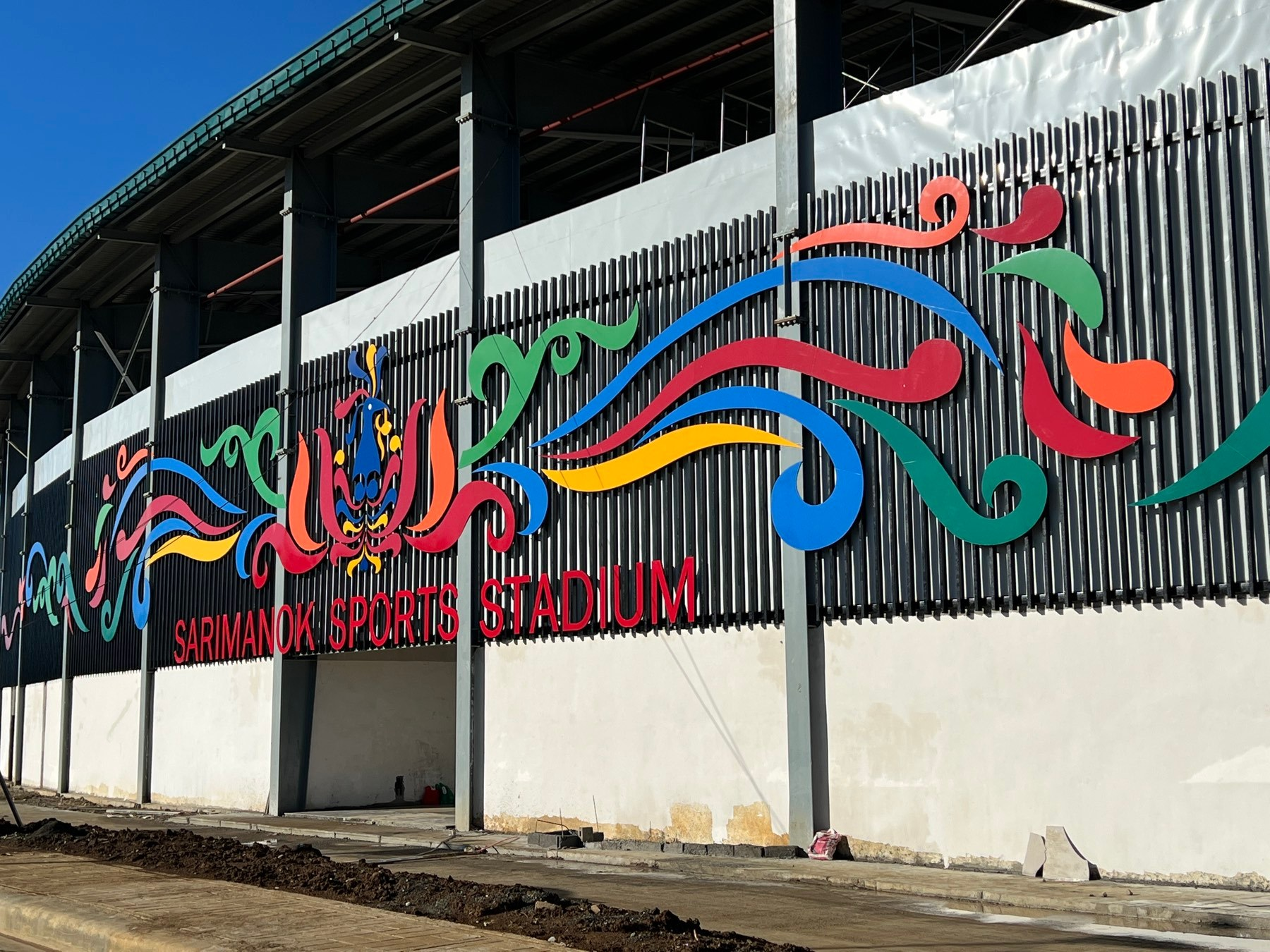
Sarimanok Sports Stadium, with the capacity of 3,700 people, was inaugurated in May 2022.

The Battle of Marawi between government forces and combined forces of the ISIL-linked Maute and Abu Sayyaf groups left the city in ruins.

Amid the ongoing battle on June 28, 2017, President Rodrigo Duterte, through Administrative Order No. 3, created the Task Force Bangon Marawi (TFBM) to facilitate the rehabilitation, recovery and reconstruction efforts in Marawi. As an inter-agency task force, the TFBM members were from several executive departments.

Administrative Order No. 9 dated October 27, 2017, designated the Chairman of the Housing and Urban Development Coordinating Council as the chairperson of the task force, replacing the Secretary of National Defense who became the vice-chairman along with the Secretary of Public Works and Highways.

In an attempt to "accelerate reconstruction and recovery efforts" in Marawi, on December 22, 2023, President Bongbong Marcos signed an administrative order abolishing the task force and directing regular line agencies to take over the rehabilitation of the city. Marcos further ordered the agency's unused funds to be surrendered to the Office of the President.

== Composition ==
Heads

- Chairperson: Eduardo del Rosario (Housing and Urban Development Coordinating Council)
- Vice Chairpersons: Delfin Lorenzana (Department of National Defense) and Mark Villar (Department of Public Works and Highways)

Members

- Chairman of the Joint Chiefs of the Armed Forces of the Philippines
- Department of Education Secretary
- Department of Health Secretary
- Department of Energy Secretary
- Department of Budget and Management Secretary
- Department of Social Welfare and Development Secretary
- Department of the Interior and Local Government Secretary
- Department of Information and Communications Technology Secretary
- Department of Science and Technology Secretary
- Department of Trade and Industry Secretary
- Department of Transportation Secretary
- Chairperson of the Local Water Utilities Administration
- Chairperson of the Mindanao Development Authority
- Chairperson of the National Electrification Administration
- General Manager of the National Housing Authority (Philippines)
- Cabinet Secretary
- Director-General of the National Economic and Development Authority
- Director-General of the Technical Education and Skills Development Authority
- Administrator of the Office of Civil Defense
- Chief of the Philippine National Police
- Representative from the Office of the President
