= Unjust vexation =

Criminal offense in the Philippines

Unjust vexation is a criminal offense under the Revised Penal Code of the Philippines. It is a form of "light coercion" involving an act by a person which causes annoyance or irritation of another.

== Definition ==
Unjust vexation is defined by Section 1, Article 287 of the 1930 Revised Penal Code of the Philippines. It is any act which while does not cause any physical or material injury causes another person's annoyance or irritation.

As per the Supreme Court ruling for Melchor G. Maderazo, et al. vs People of the Philippines in 2006, unjust vexation is also defined as a "form of light coercion which is broad enough to include any human conduct which, although not productive of some physical or material harm, would unjustly annoy or irritate an innocent person".

Unjust vexation is a felony by dolo, which means that malice needed to be proven to convict someone of the crime. Good faith is seen as a credible defense against an unjust vexation charge.

The unjust vexation provision has been described as a "strange law". It has been described as a "law against being annoying".

== Penalty ==
The original penalty as stipulated in the 1930 Revised Penal Code is arresto menor – imprisonment of one to 30 days or a fine ranging from ₱5 to ₱200 or both. The fine was increased by Republic Act 10951 of 2017. Currently the fine ranges from ₱1,000 to ₱40,000.

There has been an instance that that a man was able to serve his sentence through community service instead of the usual penalties. The man convicted in 2016 was able to petition the Supreme Court to retroactively benefit from the Republic Act No. 11362, or the Community Service Act of 2019.

Penalty	Revised Penal Code (1930)	As amended by R.A. 10951 (2017)
Imprisonment	arresto menor (1–30 days)	
Fine	₱5–200	₱1,000–40,000

== Proposed reform or abolition ==
Senator Miriam Defensor-Santiago has attempted to make a more clearer definition for the offense of unjust vexation. She has also proposed increasing the penalty to arresto mayor – imprisonment of one to six months or a fine ranging from ₱500 to ₱5,000, or both. This was when the law was still following the original penalties stipulated in the 1930 Revised Penal Code.

Jaime Fresnedi of Muntinlupa has filed House Bill No. 10510 abolishing the unjust vexation provision, dropping all existing unjust vexation charges, and freeing all those convicted due to the offense. He believes that the definition of unjust vexation was up to the complainant calling it a "catch-all crime". He insist that the provision is unconstitutional since the constitution does not allow ex post facto laws.
