= 2019 Philippine House of Representatives elections =

25th Philippine House of Representatives elections

- May 13, 2019
- All 304 seats to the House of Representatives of the Philippines; 153 seats needed for a majority
- Congressional district elections
- All 243 seats from congressional districts
Party	Vote %	Seats	+/–
PDP–Laban	31.22	82	+79
Nacionalista	16.10	42	+18
NPC	14.31	37	−5
NUP	9.51	25	+2
Liberal	5.73	18	−97
Lakas	5.11	12	+8
PFP	2.38	5	+5
Aksyon	0.98	1	0
PMP	0.98	1	+1
LDP	0.62	2	0
PRP	0.34	1	+1
CDP	0.20	1	+1
Others	9.61	16	+8
This lists parties that won seats. See the complete results below.
- Party-list election
- All 61 seats under the party-list system
Party	Vote %	Seats	+/–
ACT-CIS	9.51	3	+3
Bayan Muna	4.01	3	+2
Ako Bicol	3.76	2	−1
CIBAC	3.33	2	+1
Ang Probinsyano	2.76	2	+2
1-Pacman	2.56	2	0
Marino	2.44	2	+2
Probinsyano Ako	2.26	2	+2
Others	46.48	43	+11
This lists parties that won seats. See the complete results below.
Election results; map refers to results from congressional districts, with Metro Manila, parts of Metro Cebu and Metro Davao at the inset, while the boxes to the left represent party-list seats.
Speaker before	Speaker after
Gloria Macapagal Arroyo; PDP–Laban	Alan Peter Cayetano; Nacionalista

The 2019 Philippine House of Representatives elections were the 35th lower house elections in the Philippines, and 25th as House of Representatives. They were held on May 13, 2019, to elect members to the House of Representatives.

Candidates were expected to be either for or against President Rodrigo Duterte. As the Philippines has a multi-party system, those who are for (or against) Duterte may find themselves running against each other. Other districts that may be seen as safe seats may see a candidate elected unopposed. Several seats have not been apportioned since 1907, gerrymandering on some newly apportioned seats and entrenchment of political dynasties make competitive races in so-called swing seats rare. The Liberal Party was expected to lead the opposition against PDP–Laban.

The pro-Duterte parties overwhelmingly won most of the seats in the House. Pro-Duterte party-list ACT-CIS emerged as the topnotcher in the party-list election. There was infighting among the pro-Duterte parties on who should be elected Speaker. Alan Peter Cayetano agreed on term-sharing with Lord Allan Jay Velasco for the speakership, with the former serving for the first 15 months, while the latter serving for the last 21 months.

== Electoral system ==
The Philippines uses parallel voting for its lower house elections. There are currently 297 seats in the House; 238 of these are district representatives, and 59 are party-list representatives. Philippine law mandates that there should be one party-list representative for every four district representatives. District representatives are elected under the plurality voting system from single-member districts. Party-list representatives are elected via the nationwide vote with a 2% "soft" election threshold, with a 3-seat cap. The party in the party-list election with the most votes usually wins three seats, the other parties with more than 2% of the vote two seats, and the parties with less than 2% of the vote winning a seat each if the 20% quota is not met.

Campaigning for elections from congressional districts seats are decidedly local; the candidates are most likely a part of an election slate that includes candidates for other positions in the locality, and slates may comprise different parties. The political parties contesting the election make no attempt to create a national campaign.

Party-list campaigning, on the other hand, is done on a national scale. Parties usually attempt to appeal to a specific demographic. Polling is usually conducted for the party-list election, while pollsters may release polls on specific district races. In district elections, pollsters do not attempt to make forecasts on how many votes a party would achieve, nor the number of seats a party would win; they do attempt to do that in party-list elections, though.

== Redistricting ==
Reapportioning (redistricting) the number of seats is either via national reapportionment three years after the release of every census, or via piecemeal redistricting for every province or city. National reapportionment has not happened since the 1987 constitution took effect, and aside from piecemeal redistricting, the apportionment was based on the ordinance from the constitution, which was in turn based from the 1980 census.

=== Changes from the outgoing Congress ===
In total, five new district seats were created. Two were in Isabela, where the entire province was redistricted from four districts to six, and one each in Cavite, where the sixth district was redistricted into districts, Aklan, which was divided into two districts, and Laguna, where Calamba was separated from the second district.

- Reapportionment of Cavite's 6th district and 7th district to three districts
  - General Trias becomes the 6th district.
  - The rest of the old 6th district and Indang from the 7th district becomes the 7th district.
  - The rest of the old 7th district becomes the 8th district.
  - Enacted into law as Republic Act No. 11069.
- Division of Aklan's at-large district to two districts
  - Aklan's eastern municipalities becomes the 1st district.
  - The western municipalities becomes the 2nd district.
  - Enacted into law as Republic Act No. 11077.
- Division of Laguna's 2nd district to two districts
  - Calamba becomes its own at-large district.
  - The rest of the 2nd district was kept intact.
  - Enacted into law as Republic Act No. 11078.
- Reapportionment of Isabela from four districts to six
  - This reapportions Isabela from the current four districts to six.
  - Enacted into law as Republic Act No. 11080.

There were an additional two new districts created, after preparations have begun:

- Division of Southern Leyte's at-large district to two districts
  - Southern Leyte's municipalities to the east of Sogod Bay becomes the 1st district.
  - The municipalities to the west, including Sogod, becomes the 2nd district.
  - Enacted into law as Republic Act No. 11198.
- Division of South Cotabato's 1st district to two districts
  - General Santos becomes the 3rd district.
  - The rest of the 1st district is kept intact.
  - Enacted into law as Republic Act No. 11243.

However, as preparations were already on its way when the laws for the creation of General Santos's and Southern Leyte's districts were made, the commission decided to delay elections for the four seats involved to October 2019; the ballots for those districts showed their previous conflagrations as if it were not redistricted yet. A lawsuit was then decided by the Supreme Court prior to rescheduled elections, ordering the commission to declare the winner of the election in South Cotabato's 1st district. Upon doing so, the commission then declared the winner of the Southern Leyte at-large district as well. The first elections for these two districts shall be in 2022, at the next general election.

=== Summary of changes ===
As there are now 243 districts; therefore, there are 61 party-list seats (at least 20% of the total), an increase from 59. The 18th Congress shall then have 304 representatives.

Category	Total
Congressional districts in the outgoing Congress	236
New districts from redistricting laws from previous Congress	0
New districts from redistricting laws from outgoing Congress	5
Congressional districts in the next Congress	243
Party-list seats for the next Congress	61
Total seats for the next Congress	304

== Retiring and term-limited incumbents ==
=== Term limited ===
These representatives were term-limited, and were thus not allowed to run in 2019:

- Ang Asosasyon Sang Mangunguma Nga Bisaya Owa Mangunguma incumbents
  - Sharon Garin (party-list)
    Garin denied that either she or her siblings were running for Governor of Iloilo.
- Advocacy for Teacher Empowerment through Action, Cooperation, and Harmony Towards Educational Reforms, Inc. incumbents
  - Julieta Cortuna (party-list)
- Alliance of Concerned Teachers incumbents
  - Antonio Tinio (party-list)
- Ako Bikol incumbents
  - Rodel Batocabe (party-list)
    - Decided to run for Daraga mayor, assassinated prior to election.
  - Christopher Co (party-list)
- Buhay Hayaan Yumabong incumbents
  - Mariano Michael Velarde Jr. (party-list)
- Citizens' Battle Against Corruption incumbents
  - Sherwin Tugna (party-list)
- Democratic Independent Workers Association incumbents
  - Emmeline Aglipay-Villar (party-list)
- Gabriela Women's Party incumbents
  - Emmi de Jesus (party-list)
- Kalinga: Advocacy for Social Empowerment and Nation Building through Easing Poverty incumbents
  - Abigail Faye Ferriol-Pascual (party-list)
- Kusug Tausug incumbents
  - Shernee Tan (party-list)
- Liberal Party incumbents
  - Kaka Bag-ao (Dinagat Islands)
    Running for Governor of Dinagat Islands. Bag-ao won.
  - Teddy Baguilat (Ifugao)
    Running for Governor of Ifugao. Baguilat lost.
  - Jorge Banal (Quezon City–3rd)
  - Leopoldo Bataoil (Pangasinan–2nd)
  - Feliciano Belmonte Jr. (Quezon City–4th)
    Belmonte would retire from politics after his term ended in 2019, according to his daughter, Quezon City Vice Mayor Joy Belmonte.
  - Imelda Calixto-Rubiano (Pasay)
    Running for Mayor of Pasay under PDP–Laban. Calixto-Rubiano won.
  - Jose Carlos Cari (Leyte–5th)
  - Winnie Castelo (Quezon City–2nd)
    Running for Councilor of the 2nd District of Quezon City under Serbisyo sa Bayan Party. Castelo won.
  - Ronald Cosalan (Benguet)
  - Raul Daza (Northern Samar–1st)
  - Rogelio Espina (Biliran)
    Running for Governor of Biliran. Espina won.
  - Ana Cristina Go (Isabela–2nd)
  - Miro Quimbo (Marikina–2nd)
    Quimbo would have run for Mayor of Marikina, later, he decided not to run.
  - Carlo Lopez (Manila–2nd)
  - Rene Relampagos (Bohol–1st)
    Running for Vice Governor of Bohol under the National Unity Party. Relampagos won.
  - Linabelle Ruth Villarica (Bulacan–4th)
    Running for Mayor of Meycauayan, Bulacan under PDP–Laban.
- LPG Marketers Association incumbents
  - Arnel Ty (party-list)
- Nacionalista Party incumbents
  - Florencio Flores Jr. (Bukidnon–2nd)
  - Seth Frederick "Bullet" Jalosjos (Zamboanga del Norte–1st)
    running for Governor of Zamboanga del Norte; lost to Roberto Uy.
  - Imelda Marcos (Ilocos Norte–2nd)
    running for Governor of Ilocos Norte, later withdrew
- Nationalist People's Coalition incumbents
  - Pedro Acharon Jr. (South Cotabato–1st)
  - Mercedes Alvarez (Negros Occidental–6th)
    In 2017, Alvarez said she plans to retire from politics after finishing her term. She denied reports of her running for local posts in Hinoba-an, and that there were no offers to her yet for provincial-level positions.
  - Eleanor Bulut-Begtang (Apayao)
    Running for Governor of Apayao. Bulut-Begtang won unopposed.
  - Napoleon Dy (Isabela–3rd)
    Running for Governor of Isabela
  - Aurora Enerio-Cerilles (Zamboanga del Sur–2nd)
    Running for Governor of Zamboanga del Sur; lost to Victor Yu.
  - Marlyn Primicias-Agabas (Pangasinan–6th)
- National Unity Party incumbents
  - Romeo Acop (Antipolo–2nd)
  - Benhur Salimbangon (Cebu–4th)
  - Randolph Ting (Cagayan–3rd)
- Partido Demokratiko Pilipino-Lakas ng Bayan incumbents
  - Jorge Almonte (Misamis Occidental–1st)
  - Rolando Andaya Jr. (Camarines Sur–1st)
    Running for Governor of Camarines Sur. Andaya lost.
  - Alfredo Benitez (Negros Occidental–3rd)
  - Nancy Catamco (Cotabato–3rd)
    Running for Governor of Cotabato. Catamco won.
  - Arnel Cerafica (Taguig–1st/Pateros)
    Running for Mayor of Taguig. Cerafica lost.
  - Dakila Cua (Quirino)
    First rumored to run for senator of the Philippines, running for Governor of Quirino.
  - Arthur Defensor Jr. (Iloilo–3rd)
    Running for Governor of Iloilo. Defensor won
  - Ben Evardone (Eastern Samar)
    Running for Governor of Eastern Samar. Evardone won.
  - Rodolfo Fariñas (Ilocos Norte–1st)
    Retired from politics, withdrew from running for Governor of Ilocos Norte.
  - Salvio Fortuno (Camarines Sur–5th)
  - Mylene Garcia Albano (Davao City–2nd)
  - Fernando Gonzalez (Albay–3rd)
  - Scott Davies Lanete (Masbate–3rd)
    Running for Governor of Masbate under the Nationalist People's Coalition. Lanete lost.
  - Roy Loyola (Cavite–5th)
    Running for Mayor of Carmona, Cavite, under the Nationalist People's Coalition. Loyola won.
  - Gloria Macapagal Arroyo (Pampanga–2nd)
    Arroyo said that she would retire after the end of her term.
  - Karlo Nograles (Davao City–1st)
    Later appointed as Cabinet Secretary
  - Rosenda Ann Ocampo (Manila–6th)
  - Evelyn Plaza-Mellana (Agusan del Sur–2nd)
  - Maria Valentina Plaza (Agusan del Sur–1st)
    Running for Governor of Agusan del Sur under the Partido Demokratiko Sosyalista ng Pilipinas. Plaza lost.
  - Jesus Sacdalan (Cotabato–1st)
  - Cesar Sarmiento (Catanduanes)
  - Bai Sandra Sema (Maguindanao–1st)
  - Deogracias Ramos Jr. (Sorsogon–2nd)
  - Jerry Treñas (Iloilo City)
    Running for mayor under the National Unity Party. Treñas won.
  - Reynaldo Umali (Oriental Mindoro–2nd)
    Running for governor under the Partido Federal ng Pilipinas. Umali lost.
  - Peter Unabia (Misamis Oriental–1st)
  - Arthur C. Yap (Bohol–3rd)
    Running for governor. Yap won.
  - Maria Carmen Zamora (Compostela Valley–1st)
    Running for vice governor under the Hugpong ng Pagbabago. Zamora won unopposed.
- Trade Union Congress Party incumbents
  - Raymond Democrito Mendoza (party-list)
- Independent incumbent
  - Toby Tiangco (Navotas)
    Running for Mayor of Navotas under Partido Navoteño. Tiangco won.

=== Retiring ===
These representatives are not term limited, but did not run:

- Vicente Alcala (PDP–Laban, Quezon-2nd)
  Ran and lost for Governor of Quezon.
- Arlene Arcillas (PDP–Laban, Laguna-1st)
  Ran and won for Mayor of Santa Rosa, Laguna.
- Jennifer Austria-Barzaga (NUP, Cavite 4th)
  Ran and won for Mayor of Dasmariñas, Cavite.
- Ferjenel Biron (National Unity Party, Iloilo-4th)
  Ran and lost for Governor of Iloilo.
- Pia Cayetano, (Nacionalista, Taguig–2nd)
  Ran and won for senator.
- Vincent Crisologo (PDP–Laban, Quezon City–1st)
  Ran and lost for Mayor of Quezon City.
- Anna Katrina Enverga-dela Paz (NPC, Quezon-1st)
  Running for reelection, later withdrew
- Gwendolyn Garcia (PDP–Laban, Cebu–3rd)
  Ran and won for Governor of Cebu.
- Alexandra Gonzales (PDP–Laban, Mandaluyong)
  Running for reelection, later withdrew
- Datu Zajid Mangudadatu (PDP–Laban, Maguindanao-2nd)
  Ran and lost for senator
- Danilo Suarez (Lakas, Quezon-3rd)
  Ran and won for Governor of Quezon.
- Chiqui Roa-Puno (NUP, Antipolo-1st)
  Not running for reelection
- Monsour del Rosario (PDP–Laban, Makati-1st)
  Ran and lost for Vice Mayor of Makati.
- Gustavo Tambunting (PDP–Laban, Parañaque–2nd)
  Running for reelection, later withdrew

=== Mid-term vacancies ===
These congressmen left office before their terms expired, and were not replaced. As the 17th Congress has not called for special elections, these seats remain vacant until the sine die adjournment. For party-list representatives, the next person on the list would assume office. In both instances this happened, the next person on the list replaced the person who resigned.

- Tupay Loong (NUP, Sulu-1st)
  Died on June 30, 2016, before taking his oath of office.
- Mark Villar (Nacionalista, Las Piñas)
  Resigned after appointed as Secretary of Public Works and Highways on August 1, 2016.
- Jum Jainudin Akbar (Liberal, Basilan)
  Died on November 11, 2016.
- Maximo Dalog (Liberal, Mountain Province)
  Died on June 3, 2017.
- Henedina Abad (Liberal, Batanes)
  Died on October 8, 2017.

== Participating parties ==
=== Contesting district elections ===
Party	Leader	House leader	Support of Duterte's policies	Total seats	Current bloc
PDP–Laban	President Rodrigo Duterte	Speaker Gloria Macapagal Arroyo (Pampanga)	Very supportive	94	Majority except for 2 with the minority.
Nacionalista	Manny Villar	Deputy Speaker Pia Cayetano (Taguig)	Supportive	37	Majority except for 1 with the minority.
NPC	Danding Cojuangco	Arnulfo Fuentebella (Camarines Sur)	Generally supportive	33	Majority except for 1 with the minority.
NUP	Albert Garcia	Deputy Speaker Fredenil Castro (Capiz)	Generally supportive	28	Majority.
Liberal	Vice President Leni Robredo	Teddy Baguilat (Ifugao)	Generally opposed	18	Split; mostly in the independent minority, 5 with the majority.
Lakas	Bong Revilla	Minority Leader Danilo Suarez (Quezon)	Nominally opposed	5	Split; mostly in majority except for 1 with the minority.

The seats held by each party were expected to change by the time candidacies were declared in late 2018.

=== Contesting via the party-list system ===
The parties under the Makabayan bloc was formerly supportive of Duterte's policies until Duterte suspended peace talks with the Communist Party of the Philippines.

== Marginal seats ==
These are the marginal seats that had a winning margin of 5% or less, in ascending order.

=== Held by PDP–Laban ===
District	Incumbent	Party	2016 margin
Sultan Kudarat–2nd	Horacio Suansing Jr.	PDP–Laban	0.86%
Malabon	Federico Sandoval II	PDP–Laban	1.27%
Parañaque–2nd	Gustavo Tambunting	PDP–Laban	2.27%
Lanao del Sur–2nd	Mauyag Papandayan Jr.	PDP–Laban	2.96%

=== Held by other parties ===
District	Incumbent	Party	2016 margin
Leyte–3rd	Vicente Veloso	NUP	0.06%
Romblon	Emmanuel Madrona	Nacionalista	0.17%
Northern Samar–1st	Raul Daza	Liberal	0.18%
Camarines Sur–4th	Arnulfo Fuentebella	NPC	0.44%
Negros Oriental–2nd	Manuel Sagarbarria	NPC	0.44%
Bacolod	Greg Gasataya	NPC	0.50%
Aurora	Bellaflor Angara-Castillo	LDP	0.78%
Nueva Ecija–3rd	Rosanna Vergara	LDP	0.98%
Nueva Vizcaya	Luisa Lloren Cuaresma	NUP	1.16%
Negros Occidental–5th	Alejandro Mirasol	Lakas	1.87%
Quezon–1st	Trina Enverga	NPC	2.29%
Camarines Norte–1st	Renato Unico Jr.	NUP	2.30%
Palawan–3rd	Gil Acosta	NPC	2.75%
Bulacan–3rd	Lorna Silverio	NUP	4.08%
Baguio	Marc Go	Nacionalista	4.48%
Aklan	Carlito Marquez	NPC	4.61%

== Results ==
=== Congressional district results ===
Party	Votes	%	+/–	Seats	+/–
PDP–Laban	12,653,960	31.22	+29.32	82	+79
Nacionalista Party	6,524,100	16.10	+6.68	42	+18
Nationalist People's Coalition	5,797,543	14.31	−2.73	37	−5
National Unity Party	3,852,909	9.51	−0.16	25	+2
Liberal Party	2,321,759	5.73	−35.99	18	−97
Lakas–CMD	2,069,871	5.11	+3.57	12	+8
Partido Federal ng Pilipinas	965,048	2.38	New	5	New
Hugpong ng Pagbabago	652,318	1.61	New	3	New
Aksyon Demokratiko	398,616	0.98	−0.4	1	0
Pwersa ng Masang Pilipino	396,614	0.98	+0.77	1	New
Bukidnon Paglaum	335,628	0.83	+0.48	2	+1
Pederalismo ng Dugong Dakilang Samahan	259,423	0.64	New	0	0
Laban ng Demokratikong Pilipino	252,806	0.62	+0.32	2	0
United Nationalist Alliance	232,657	0.57	−6.05	0	−11
Hugpong sa Tawong Lungsod	197,024	0.49	+0.35	1	New
Partidong Pagbabago ng Palawan	185,810	0.46	New	2	New
Bileg Ti Ilokano	158,523	0.39	New	1	New
People's Reform Party	138,014	0.34	New	1	New
Unang Sigaw	120,674	0.30	New	0	0
Katipunan ng Demokratikong Pilipino	116,453	0.29	New	0	0
Asenso Abrenio	115,865	0.29	New	1	New
KAMBILAN	107,078	0.26	New	0	0
Padayon Pilipino	98,450	0.24	−0.10	0	0
Asenso Manileño	84,656	0.21	−0.29	2	0
Kusog Bicolandia	82,832	0.20	New	0	0
Centrist Democratic Party of the Philippines	81,741	0.20	+0.16	1	New
Partido Navoteño	80,265	0.20	New	1	New
Kabalikat ng Bayan sa Kaunlaran	65,836	0.16	−0.03	1	0
Partido Demokratiko Sosyalista ng Pilipinas	56,223	0.14	New	0	0
Bagumbayan–VNP	33,731	0.08	New	0	0
Kilusang Bagong Lipunan	33,594	0.08	−0.45	0	0
Adelante Zamboanga Party	28,605	0.07	New	0	0
Labor Party Philippines	9,718	0.02	+0.00	0	0
Democratic Party of the Philippines	1,110	0.00	New	0	0
Hugpong Surigao Sur	816	0.00	New	0	0
Philippine Green Republican Party	701	0.00	−0.01	0	0
Independent	2,014,211	4.97	−0.86	2	−2
Party-list seats (Note: There were supposed to be 306 seats up, out of 245 districts and 61 party-seats. Elections at two districts were deferred after ballots were already printed using the old configuration. After the party-list seats were seated, the Supreme Court then ruled that one of the districts shall first disputed in the 2022 election, and that the results of the 2019 election using the old configuration stood. The Commission on Elections then ruled that for other district, the same ruling from the Supreme Court would also be followed. This reduced the number of congressional district seats to 243, and would have meant a reduction of one party-list seat, but that was no longer acted upon.)				61	+2
Total	40,525,182	100.00	–	304	+5
Valid votes	40,525,182	86.34	+2.37		
Invalid/blank votes	6,411,957	13.66	−2.37		
Total votes	46,937,139	100.00	–		
Registered voters/turnout	61,843,771	75.90	−5.76		
Source: COMELEC (Seats won), (Turnout and electorate)

Vote share
PDP–Laban	31.22%
Nacionalista	16.10%
NPC	14.31%
NUP	9.51%
Liberal	5.73%
Lakas	5.11%
Others	18.02%

Congressional district seats
PDP–Laban	33.74%
Nacionalista	17.28%
NPC	15.23%
NUP	10.29%
Liberal	7.41%
Lakas	4.94%
Others	11.11%

==== Results by congressional district ====
Congressional district	Incumbent	Incumbent's party	Winner	Winner's party	Winning margin
Abra	Joseph Bernos	Asenso Abrenio	Joseph Bernos	Asenso Abrenio	71.83%
Agusan del Norte–1st	Lawrence Fortun	Nacionalista	Lawrence Fortun	Nacionalista	62.96%
Agusan del Norte–2nd	Erlpe John Amante	Nacionalista	Angelica Amante	PDP–Laban	26.59%
Agusan del Sur–1st	Maria Valentina Plaza	PDP–Laban	Alfel Bascug	NUP	28.37%
Agusan del Sur–2nd	Evelyn Plaza-Mellana	PDP–Laban	Eddiebong Plaza	NUP	78.23%
Aklan–1st	New seat		Carlito Marquez (Note: Redistricted from Aklan.)	NPC	34.85%
Aklan–2nd	New seat		Teodorico Haresco Jr.	Nacionalista	30.48%
Albay–1st	Edcel Lagman	Liberal	Edcel Lagman	Liberal	11.03%
Albay–2nd	Joey Salceda	PDP–Laban	Joey Salceda	PDP–Laban	89.28%
Albay–3rd	Fernando Gonzalez	PDP–Laban	Fernando Cabredo	PDP–Laban	9.06%
Antipolo–1st	Chiqui Roa-Puno	NUP	Roberto Puno	NUP	86.01%
Antipolo–2nd	Romeo Acop	NUP	Resurreccion Acop	NUP	Unopposed
Antique	Paolo Everardo Javier	PDP–Laban	Loren Legarda	NPC	47.39%
Apayao	Eleanor Begtang	PDP–Laban	Elias Bulut Jr.	NPC	Unopposed
Aurora	Bella Angara	LDP	Rommel T. Angara	LDP	26.78%
Bacolod	Greg Gasataya	NPC	Greg Gasataya	NPC	22.63%
Baguio	Mark Go	Nacionalista	Mark Go	Nacionalista	25.30%
Basilan	Vacant (Note: Incumbent Jum Jainudin Akbar (Liberal) died on November 11, 2016.)		Mujiv Hataman	Liberal	62.85%
Bataan–1st	Geraldine Roman	PDP–Laban	Geraldine Roman	PDP–Laban	83.18%
Bataan–2nd	Joet Garcia	PDP–Laban	Joet Garcia	PDP–Laban	Unopposed
Batanes	Vacant (Note: Incumbent Henedina Abad (Liberal) died on October 8, 2017.)		Jun Gato	NPC	2.50%
Batangas–1st	Eileen Ermita-Buhain	Nacionalista	Eileen Ermita-Buhain	Nacionalista	62.56%
Batangas–2nd	Raneo Abu	Nacionalista	Raneo Abu	NPC	77.83%
Batangas–3rd	Maria Theresa Collantes	PDP–Laban	Maria Theresa Collantes	PDP–Laban	48.33%
Batangas–4th	Lianda Bolilia	Nacionalista	Lianda Bolilia	Nacionalista	10.98%
Batangas–5th	Marvey Mariño	Nacionalista	Marvey Mariño	Nacionalista	Unopposed
Batangas–6th	Vilma Santos	Nacionalista	Vilma Santos	Nacionalista	22.03%
Benguet	Ronald Cosalan	PDP–Laban	Nestor Fongwan	PDP–Laban	61.17%
Biliran	Rogelio Espina	Nacionalista	Gerardo Espina Jr.	PDP–Laban	9.19%
Biñan	Len Alonte	PDP–Laban	Len Alonte	PDP–Laban	67.50%
Bohol–1st	Rene Relampagos	NUP	Edgar Chatto	Liberal	38.01%
Bohol–2nd	Aris Aumentado	NPC	Aris Aumentado	NPC	42.17%
Bohol–3rd	Arthur C. Yap	PDP–Laban	Alexie Tutor	Nacionalista	4.00%
Bukidnon–1st	Maria Lourdes Acosta-Alba	BPP	Maria Lourdes Acosta-Alba	BPP	90.98%
Bukidnon–2nd	Florencio Flores Jr.	Nacionalista	Jonathan Keith Flores	PDP–Laban	7.04%
Bukidnon–3rd	Manuel Zubiri	BPP	Manuel Zubiri	BPP	Unopposed
Bukidnon–4th	Rogelio Neil Roque	Nacionalista	Rogelio Neil Roque	Nacionalista	55.01%
Bulacan–1st	Jose Antonio Sy-Alvarado	NUP	Jose Antonio Sy-Alvarado	NUP	52.93%
Bulacan–2nd	Gavini Pancho	NUP	Gavini Pancho	NUP	89.30%
Bulacan–3rd	Lorna Silverio	NUP	Lorna Silverio	NUP	12.28%
Bulacan–4th	Linabelle Villarica	PDP–Laban	Henry Villarica	PDP–Laban	Unopposed
Cagayan–1st	Ramon Nolasco	PDP–Laban	Ramon Nolasco Jr.	PDP–Laban	Unopposed
Cagayan–2nd	Baby Alfonso	NUP	Samantha Louise Vargas-Alfonso	NUP	41.29%
Cagayan–3rd	Randolph Ting	NUP	Joseph Lara	PDP–Laban	23.03%
Cagayan de Oro–1st	Rolando Uy	PDP–Laban	Rolando Uy	PDP–Laban	54.14%
Cagayan de Oro–2nd	Maximo Rodriguez Jr.	PDP–Laban	Rufus Rodriguez	CDP	27.26%
Calamba	New seat		Jun Chipeco (Note: Redistricted from Laguna–2nd.)	Nacionalista	Unopposed
Caloocan–1st	Along Malapitan	PDP–Laban	Along Malapitan	PDP–Laban	Unopposed
Caloocan–2nd	Edgar Erice	Liberal	Edgar Erice	Liberal	80.59%
Camarines Norte–1st	Renato Unico Jr.	NUP	Josefina Tallado	PDP–Laban	6.68%
Camarines Norte–2nd	Marisol Panotes	PDP–Laban	Marisol Panotes	PDP–Laban	34.11%
Camarines Sur–1st	Rolando Andaya Jr.	NPC	Marissa Mercado-Andaya	NPC	35.56%
Camarines Sur–2nd	Luis Raymund Villafuerte	Nacionalista	Luis Raymund Villafuerte	Nacionalista	2.18%
Camarines Sur–3rd	Gabriel Bordado	Liberal	Gabriel Bordado	Liberal	10.03%
Camarines Sur–4th	Arnulfo Fuentebella	NPC	Arnulf Bryan Fuentebella	NPC	12.16%
Camarines Sur–5th	Salvio Fortuno	Nacionalista	Jocelyn Fortuno	Nacionalista	15.95%
Camiguin	Xavier Jesus Romualdo	PDP–Laban	Xavier Jesus Romualdo	PDP–Laban	78.17%
Capiz–1st	Tawi Billones	Liberal	Tawi Billones	Liberal	15.85%
Capiz–2nd	Fredenil Castro	NUP	Fredenil Castro	NUP	91.73%
Catanduanes	Cesar Sarmiento	PDP–Laban	Hector Sanchez	Independent	8.35%
Cavite–1st	Francis Gerald Abaya	Liberal	Francis Gerald Abaya	Liberal	78.56%
Cavite–2nd	Strike Revilla	NUP	Strike Revilla	NUP	Unopposed
Cavite–3rd	Alex Advincula	PDP–Laban	Alex Advincula	PDP–Laban	Unopposed
Cavite–4th	Jenny Barzaga	NUP	Elpidio Barzaga Jr.	NUP	57.27%
Cavite–5th	Roy Loyola	NPC	Dahlia Loyola	NPC	89.78%
Cavite–6th	Luis Ferrer IV	NUP	Luis Ferrer IV	NUP	Unopposed
Cavite–7th	Abraham Tolentino	PDP–Laban	Jesus Crispin Remulla	NUP	35.66%
Cavite–8th	New seat		Abraham Tolentino (Note: Redistricted from Cavite–7th.)	PDP–Laban	Unopposed
Cebu–1st	Samsam Gullas	Independent	Eduardo Gullas	Nacionalista	64.80%
Cebu–2nd	Wilfredo Caminero	NUP	Wilfredo Caminero	NUP	14.72%
Cebu–3rd	Gwendolyn Garcia	PDP–Laban	Pablo John Garcia	PDP–Laban	20.78%
Cebu–4th	Benhur Salimbangon	NUP	Janice Salimbangon	NUP	13.78%
Cebu–5th	Ramon Durano VI	NPC	Duke Frasco	Lakas	13.22%
Cebu–6th	Jonas Cortes	PDP–Laban	Emmarie Dizon	PDP–Laban	60.52%
Cebu–7th	Peter John Calderon	NPC	Peter John Calderon	NPC	32.61%
Cebu City–1st	Raul del Mar	Liberal	Raul del Mar	Liberal	24.42%
Cebu City–2nd	Rodrigo Abellanosa	LDP	Rodrigo Abellanosa	LDP	22.45%
Compostela Valley–1st	Maria Carmen Zamora	HNP	Manuel E. Zamora	HNP	5.00%
Compostela Valley–2nd	Ruwel Peter Gonzaga	PDP–Laban	Ruwel Peter Gonzaga	PDP–Laban	Unopposed
Cotabato–1st	Jesus Sacdalan	PDP–Laban	Joselito Sacdalan	PDP–Laban	10.64%
Cotabato–2nd	Nancy Catamco	PDP–Laban	Rudy Caoagdan	Nacionalista	12.82%
Cotabato–3rd	Jose Tejada	Nacionalista	Jose Tejada	Nacionalista	Unopposed
Davao City–1st	Vacant (Note: Incumbent Karlo Nograles (PDP–Laban) resigned after being appointed as Cabinet Secretary on November 5, 2018.)		Paolo Duterte	HTL	93.95%
Davao City–2nd	Mylene Garcia-Albano	PDP–Laban	Vincent Garcia	HNP	Unopposed
Davao City–3rd	Alberto Ungab	HNP	Isidro Ungab	HNP	Unopposed
Davao del Norte–1st	Pantaleon Alvarez	PDP–Laban	Pantaleon Alvarez	PDP–Laban	42.82%
Davao del Norte–2nd	Antonio Floirendo Jr.	HNP	Alan Dujali	PDP–Laban	14.87%
Davao del Sur	Mercedes Cagas	Nacionalista	Mercedes Cagas	Nacionalista	36.62%
Davao Occidental	Lorna Bautista-Bandigan	NPC	Lorna Bautista-Bandigan	NPC	Unopposed
Davao Oriental–1st	Corazon Nuñez Malanyaon	Nacionalista	Corazon Nuñez Malanyaon	Nacionalista	Unopposed
Davao Oriental–2nd	Joel Mayo Almario	PDP–Laban	Joel Mayo Almario	PDP–Laban	Unopposed
Dinagat Islands	Kaka Bag-ao	Liberal	Alan Ecleo	PDP–Laban	0.92%
Eastern Samar	Ben Evardone	PDP–Laban	Maria Fe Abunda	PDP–Laban	3.11%
Guimaras	Lucille Nava	PDP–Laban	Lucille Nava	PDP–Laban	76.94%
Ifugao	Teddy Baguilat	Liberal	Solomon Chungalao	NPC	1.95%
Iligan	Frederick Siao	Nacionalista	Frederick Siao	Nacionalista	2.15%
Ilocos Norte–1st	Rodolfo Fariñas	PDP–Laban	Ria Christina Fariñas	PDP–Laban	39.77%
Ilocos Norte–2nd	Imelda Marcos	Nacionalista	Eugenio Angelo Barba	Nacionalista	19.12%
Ilocos Sur–1st	Deogracias Victor Savellano	Nacionalista	Deogracias Victor Savellano	Nacionalista	2.10%
Ilocos Sur–2nd	Eric Singson	Bileg	Kristine Singson-Meehan	Bileg	78.80%
Iloilo–1st	Oscar Garin Jr.	Nacionalista	Janette Garin	Nacionalista	62.92%
Iloilo–2nd	Arcadio Gorriceta	Liberal	Michael Gorriceta	Nacionalista	43.83%
Iloilo–3rd	Arthur Defensor Jr.	PDP–Laban	Lorenz Defensor	PDP–Laban	72.01%
Iloilo–4th	Ferjenel Biron	Nacionalista	Braeden John Biron	Nacionalista	55.40%
Iloilo–5th	Raul Tupas	Nacionalista	Raul Tupas	Nacionalista	30.58%
Iloilo City	Jerry Treñas	NUP	Julienne Baronda	NUP	20.03%
Isabela–1st	Rodolfo Albano III	PDP–Laban	Tonypet Albano	PDP–Laban	89.33%
Isabela–2nd	Anna Cristina Go	Nacionalista	Ed Christopher Go	Nacionalista	57.24%
Isabela–3rd	Napoleon Dy	NPC	Ian Paul Dy	NPC	44.24%
Isabela–4th	Maria Lourdes Aggabao	NPC	Alyssa Sheena Tan-Dy	PFP	13.80%
Isabela–5th	New seat		Mike Dy III	PFP	34.49%
Isabela–6th	New seat		Inno Dy	PDP–Laban	82.88%
Kalinga	Allen Jesse Mangaoang	Nacionalista	Allen Jesse Mangaoang	Nacionalista	5.67%
La Union–1st	Pablo Ortega	NPC	Pablo Ortega	NPC	Unopposed
La Union–2nd	Sandra Eriguel	PDP–Laban	Sandra Eriguel	PDP–Laban	24.57%
Laguna–1st	Arlene Arcillas	PDP–Laban	Danilo Fernandez	PDP–Laban	Unopposed
Laguna–2nd	Jun Chipeco	Nacionalista	Ruth Hernandez	Independent	3.91%
Laguna–3rd	Sol Aragones	Nacionalista	Sol Aragones	Nacionalista	93.02%
Laguna–4th	Benjamin Agarao Jr.	PDP–Laban	Benjamin Agarao Jr.	PDP–Laban	16.13%
Lanao del Norte–1st	Mohamad Khalid Dimaporo	PDP–Laban	Mohamad Khalid Dimaporo	PDP–Laban	75.48%
Lanao del Norte–2nd	Abdullah Dimaporo	NPC	Abdullah Dimaporo	NPC	39.68%
Lanao del Sur–1st	Ansaruddin Alonto Adiong	Nacionalista	Ansaruddin Alonto Adiong	Nacionalista	16.50%
Lanao del Sur–2nd	Mauyag Papandayan Jr.	PDP–Laban	Yasser Balindong	Lakas	2.73%
Lapu-Lapu City	Aileen Radaza	PDP–Laban	Paz Radaza	Lakas	9.47%
Las Piñas	Vacant (Note: Incumbent Mark Villar (Nacionalista) resigned after being appointed as Secretary of Public Works and Highways on August 1, 2016.)		Camille Villar	Nacionalista	79.57%
Leyte–1st	Yedda Marie Romualdez	Lakas	Martin Romualdez	Lakas	88.52%
Leyte–2nd	Henry Ong	PDP–Laban	Lolita Javier	PFP	11.76%
Leyte–3rd	Vicente Veloso III	NUP	Vicente Veloso III	NUP	10.94%
Leyte–4th	Lucy Torres-Gomez	PDP–Laban	Lucy Torres-Gomez	PDP–Laban	55.53%
Leyte–5th	Jose Carlos Cari	PFP	Carl Cari	PFP	34.18%
Maguindanao–1st	Bai Sandra Sema	PDP–Laban	Datu Roonie Sinsuat Sr.	PDP–Laban	17.52%
Maguindanao–2nd	Zajid Mangudadatu	PDP–Laban	Esmael Mangudadatu	PDP–Laban	10.54%
Makati–1st	Monsour del Rosario	PDP–Laban	Kid Peña	Liberal	4.20%
Makati–2nd	Luis Campos	NPC	Luis Campos	NPC	17.40%
Malabon	Ricky Sandoval	PDP–Laban	Josephine Lacson-Noel	NPC	13.44%
Mandaluyong	Alexandria Gonzales	PDP–Laban	Neptali Gonzales II	PDP–Laban	Unopposed
Manila–1st	Manny Lopez	NPC	Manny Lopez	NPC	8.54%
Manila–2nd	Carlo Lopez	PDP–Laban	Rolando Valeriano	Asenso Manileño	2.77%
Manila–3rd	Yul Servo	PDP–Laban	Yul Servo	PDP–Laban	35.63%
Manila–4th	Edward Maceda	PMP	Edward Maceda	PMP	31.44%
Manila–5th	Cristal Bagatsing	KABAKA	Cristal Bagatsing	KABAKA	0.83%
Manila–6th	Rosenda Ann Ocampo	PDP–Laban	Benny Abante	Asenso Manileño	14.91%
Marikina–1st	Bayani Fernando	NPC	Bayani Fernando	NPC	60.88%
Marikina–2nd	Miro Quimbo	Liberal	Stella Quimbo	Liberal	69.00%
Marinduque	Lord Allan Velasco	PDP–Laban	Lord Allan Velasco	PDP–Laban	89.08%
Masbate–1st	Maria Vida Espinosa-Bravo	NUP	Narciso Bravo Jr.	NUP	1.45%
Masbate–2nd	Elisa Olga Kho	PDP–Laban	Elisa Olga Kho	PDP–Laban	55.96%
Masbate–3rd	Scott Davies Lanete	NPC	Wilton Kho	PDP–Laban	28.49%
Misamis Occidental–1st	Jorge Almonte	Nacionalista	Diego Ty	NUP	1.92%
Misamis Occidental–2nd	Henry Oaminal	Nacionalista	Henry Oaminal	Nacionalista	58.53%
Misamis Oriental–1st	Peter Unabia	PDP–Laban	Christian Unabia	Lakas	8.92%
Misamis Oriental–2nd	Juliette Uy	NUP	Juliette Uy	NUP	34.26%
Mountain Province	Vacant (Note: Incumbent Maximo Dalog (Liberal) died on June 3, 2017.)		Maximo Dalog Jr.	Nacionalista	9.78%
Muntinlupa	Ruffy Biazon	PDP–Laban	Ruffy Biazon	PDP–Laban	64.03%
Navotas	Toby Tiangco	Partido Navoteño	John Rey Tiangco	Partido Navoteño	45.52%
Negros Occidental–1st	Melecio Yap	NPC	Gerardo Valmayor Jr.	NPC	83.08%
Negros Occidental–2nd	Leo Rafael Cueva	NUP	Leo Rafael Cueva	NUP	Unopposed
Negros Occidental–3rd	Alfredo Benitez	PDP–Laban	Jose Francisco Benitez	PDP–Laban	Unopposed
Negros Occidental–4th	Yoyette Ferrer	NUP	Yoyette Ferrer	NUP	93.53%
Negros Occidental–5th	Alejandro Mirasol	Lakas	Maria Lourdes Arroyo	Lakas	Unopposed
Negros Occidental–6th	Mercedes Lansang	NPC	Genaro Alvarez Jr.	NPC	83.13%
Negros Oriental–1st	Jocelyn Limkaichong	Liberal	Jocelyn Limkaichong	Liberal	77.10%
Negros Oriental–2nd	Manuel Sagarbarria	NPC	Manuel Sagarbarria	NPC	88.17%
Negros Oriental–3rd	Arnolfo Teves Jr.	PDP–Laban	Arnolfo Teves Jr.	PDP–Laban	Unopposed
Northern Samar–1st	Raul Daza	Liberal	Paul Daza	Liberal	34.55%
Northern Samar–2nd	Edwin Ongchuan	NUP	Jose Ong Jr.	PDP–Laban	62.37%
Nueva Ecija–1st	Estrellita Suansing	PDP–Laban	Estrellita Suansing	PDP–Laban	20.75%
Nueva Ecija–2nd	Micaela Violago	NUP	Micaela Violago	NUP	47.78%
Nueva Ecija–3rd	Rosanna Vergara	PDP–Laban	Rosanna Vergara	PDP–Laban	14.10%
Nueva Ecija–4th	Magnolia Antonino-Nadres	NUP	Maricel Natividad-Nagaño	PRP	4.59%
Nueva Vizcaya	Luisa Cuaresma	NUP	Luisa Cuaresma	NUP	12.69%
Occidental Mindoro	Josephine Sato	Liberal	Josephine Sato	Liberal	33.34%
Oriental Mindoro–1st	Paulino Salvador Leachon	PDP–Laban	Paulino Salvador Leachon	PDP–Laban	12.19%
Oriental Mindoro–2nd	Reynaldo Umali	PFP	Alfonso Umali Jr.	Liberal	8.52%
Palawan–1st	Franz Alvarez	NUP	Franz Alvarez	NUP	Unopposed
Palawan–2nd	Frederick Abueg	PDP–Laban	Beng Abueg	PPPL	71.86%
Palawan–3rd	Gil Acosta	NPC	Gil Acosta Jr.	PPPL	22.16%
Pampanga–1st	Carmelo Lazatin II	PDP–Laban	Carmelo Lazatin II	PDP–Laban	17.15%
Pampanga–2nd	Gloria Macapagal Arroyo	PDP–Laban	Mikey Arroyo	Lakas	87.14%
Pampanga–3rd	Aurelio Gonzales Jr.	PDP–Laban	Aurelio Gonzales Jr.	PDP–Laban	83.18%
Pampanga–4th	Juan Pablo Bondoc	PDP–Laban	Juan Pablo Bondoc	PDP–Laban	39.33%
Pangasinan–1st	Jesus Celeste	PDP–Laban	Arnold Celeste	Nacionalista	3.79%
Pangasinan–2nd	Leopoldo Bataoil	NUP	Jumel Anthony Espino	PDP–Laban	7.96%
Pangasinan–3rd	Rose Marie Arenas	PDP–Laban	Rose Marie Arenas	PDP–Laban	69.30%
Pangasinan–4th	Christopher de Venecia	Lakas	Christopher de Venecia	Lakas	54.04%
Pangasinan–5th	Amado Espino Jr.	PDP–Laban	Ramon Guico III	Lakas	1.42%
Pangasinan–6th	Marlyn Primicias-Agabas	NPC	Tyrone Agabas	NPC	87.47%
Parañaque–1st	Eric Olivarez	PDP–Laban	Eric Olivarez	PDP–Laban	68.92%
Parañaque–2nd	Gustavo Tambunting	PDP–Laban	Joy Myra Tambunting	PDP–Laban	78.91%
Pasay	Emi Rubiano	PDP–Laban	Antonino Calixto	PDP–Laban	63.99%
Pasig	Richard Eusebio	Nacionalista	Roman Romulo	Aksyon	39.09%
Quezon–1st	Trina Enverga	NPC	Mark Enverga	NPC	Unopposed
Quezon–2nd	Vicente Alcala	PDP–Laban	David C. Suarez	Nacionalista	16.87%
Quezon–3rd	Danilo Suarez	Lakas	Aleta Suarez	Lakas	68.40%
Quezon–4th	Angelina Tan	NPC	Angelina Tan	NPC	Unopposed
Quezon City–1st	Vincent Crisologo	PDP–Laban	Anthony Peter Crisologo	PDP–Laban	12.82%
Quezon City–2nd	Winston Castelo	SBP	Precious Hipolito	NPC	30.04%
Quezon City–3rd	Jorge Banal Jr.	SBP	Allan Benedict Reyes	PFP	50.93%
Quezon City–4th	Feliciano Belmonte Jr.	Liberal	Bong Suntay	PDP–Laban	70.34%
Quezon City–5th	Alfred Vargas	PDP–Laban	Alfred Vargas	PDP–Laban	79.84%
Quezon City–6th	Kit Belmonte	Liberal	Kit Belmonte	Liberal	67.67%
Quirino	Dakila Cua	PDP–Laban	Junie Cua	PDP–Laban	Unopposed
Rizal–1st	Jack Duavit	NPC	Jack Duavit	NPC	81.00%
Rizal–2nd	Isidro Rodriguez Jr.	NPC	Fidel Nograles	PDP–Laban	20.49%
Romblon	Emmanuel Madrona	Nacionalista	Eleandro Jesus Madrona	Nacionalista	17.34%
Samar–1st	Edgar Mary Sarmiento	Liberal	Edgar Mary Sarmiento	Liberal	5.54%
Samar–2nd	Milagrosa Tan	PDP–Laban	Sharee Ann Tan	PDP–Laban	12.28%
San Jose del Monte	Florida Robes	PDP–Laban	Florida Robes	PDP–Laban	6.52%
San Juan	Ronaldo Zamora	PDP–Laban	Ronaldo Zamora	PDP–Laban	19.93%
Sarangani	Rogelio Pacquiao	PDP–Laban	Rogelio Pacquiao	PDP–Laban	89.88%
Siquijor	Ramon Vicente Rocamora	PDP–Laban	Jake Vincent Villa	NPC	13.69%
Sorsogon–1st	Evelina Escudero	NPC	Evelina Escudero	NPC	30.97%
Sorsogon–2nd	Deogracias Ramos Jr.	PDP–Laban	Bernardita Ramos	NPC	29.64%
South Cotabato–1st	Pedro Acharon Jr.	NPC	Shirlyn Bañas-Nograles	PDP–Laban	52.80%
South Cotabato–2nd	Ferdinand Hernandez	PDP–Laban	Ferdinand Hernandez	PDP–Laban	64.40%
Southern Leyte	Roger Mercado	PDP–Laban	Roger Mercado	PDP–Laban	69.50%
Sultan Kudarat–1st	Suharto Mangudadatu	NUP	Rihan Sakaluran	NUP	Unopposed
Sultan Kudarat–2nd	Horacio Suansing Jr.	PDP–Laban	Horacio Suansing Jr.	PDP–Laban	85.46%
Sulu–1st	Vacant (Note: Tupay Loong (NUP) died before being sworn-in on June 30, 2016.)		Samier Tan	PDP–Laban	16.80%
Sulu–2nd	Abdulmunir Arbison	Nacionalista	Abdulmunir Arbison	Nacionalista	8.49%
Surigao del Norte–1st	Francisco Jose Matugas II	PDP–Laban	Francisco Jose Matugas II	PDP–Laban	39.91%
Surigao del Norte–2nd	Ace Barbers	Nacionalista	Ace Barbers	Nacionalista	7.73%
Surigao del Sur–1st	Prospero Pichay Jr.	Lakas	Prospero Pichay Jr.	Lakas	40.45%
Surigao del Sur–2nd	Johnny Pimentel	PDP–Laban	Johnny Pimentel	PDP–Laban	76.11%
Taguig–Pateros	Arnel Cerafica	PDP–Laban	Alan Peter Cayetano	Nacionalista	18.11%
Taguig	Pia Cayetano	Nacionalista	Lani Cayetano	Nacionalista	45.89%
Tarlac–1st	Charlie Cojuangco	NPC	Charlie Cojuangco	NPC	Unopposed
Tarlac–2nd	Victor Yap	NPC	Victor Yap	NPC	89.32%
Tarlac–3rd	Noel Villanueva	NPC	Noel Villanueva	NPC	49.57%
Tawi-Tawi	Ruby Sahali	PDP–Laban	Rashidin Matba	NUP	11.51%
Valenzuela–1st	Wes Gatchalian	NPC	Wes Gatchalian	NPC	Unopposed
Valenzuela–2nd	Eric Martinez	PDP–Laban	Eric Martinez	PDP–Laban	47.60%
Zambales–1st	Jeffrey Khonghun	Nacionalista	Jeffrey Khonghun	Nacionalista	41.58%
Zambales–2nd	Cheryl Deloso-Montalla	Liberal	Cheryl Deloso-Montalla	Liberal	39.98%
Zamboanga City–1st	Celso Lobregat	PDP–Laban	Cesar Jimenez Jr.	PDP–Laban	7.20%
Zamboanga City–2nd	Mannix Dalipe	NPC	Mannix Dalipe	NPC	37.07%
Zamboanga del Norte–1st	Bullet Jalosjos	Nacionalista	Romeo Jalosjos Jr.	Nacionalista	5.19%
Zamboanga del Norte–2nd	Glona Labadlabad	PDP–Laban	Glona Labadlabad	PDP–Laban	8.60%
Zamboanga del Norte–3rd	Isagani Amatong	Liberal	Isagani Amatong	Liberal	14.34%
Zamboanga del Sur–1st	Divina Grace Yu	PDP–Laban	Divina Grace Yu	PDP–Laban	16.10%
Zamboanga del Sur–2nd	Aurora E. Cerilles	Nacionalista	Leonardo Babasa Jr.	PDP–Laban	3.45%
Zamboanga Sibugay–1st	Wilter Palma II	PDP–Laban	Wilter Palma II	PDP–Laban	11.14%
Zamboanga Sibugay–2nd	Dulce Ann Hofer	PDP–Laban	Dulce Ann Hofer	PDP–Laban	24.60%

=== Party-list election ===
Party	Votes	%	+/–	Seats	+/–
ACT-CIS Partylist	2,651,987	9.51	+9.17	3	New
Bayan Muna	1,117,403	4.01	+2.14	3	+2
Ako Bicol	1,049,040	3.76	−1.38	2	−1
Citizens' Battle Against Corruption	929,718	3.33	+1.61	2	+1
Ang Probinsyano Party-list	770,344	2.76	New	2	New
1-Pacman Party List	713,969	2.56	−1.49	2	0
Marino Party List	681,448	2.44	+2.12	2	New
Probinsyano Ako	630,435	2.26	New	2	New
Senior Citizens Partylist	516,927	1.85	−1.20	1	−1
Magsasaka Partylist	496,337	1.78	New	1	New
APEC Psrtylist	480,874	1.72	New	1	New
Gabriela Women's Party	449,440	1.61	−2.61	1	−1
An Waray	442,090	1.59	−0.23	1	0
Coop-NATCCO	417,285	1.50	−0.57	1	−1
Alliance of Concerned Teachers	395,327	1.42	−2.23	1	−1
Philreca Party-list	394,966	1.42	New	1	New
Ako Bisaya	394,304	1.41	New	1	New
Tingog Sinirangan	391,211	1.40	+0.75	1	New
Abono Partylist	378,204	1.36	−0.90	1	−1
Buhay Party-List	361,493	1.30	−1.05	1	−1
Duterte Youth	354,629	1.27	New	1	New
Kalinga Partylist	339,665	1.22	New	1	0
PBA Partylist	326,258	1.17	−1.24	1	−1
ALONA Partylist	320,000	1.15	−0.19	1	0
Recobada Partylist	318,511	1.14	New	1	New
Bagong Henerasyon	288,752	1.04	+0.12	1	0
BAHAY Partylist	281,793	1.01	New	1	New
Construction Workers Solidarity	277,940	1.00	+0.97	1	New
Abang Lingkod	275,199	0.99	−0.45	1	0
A Teacher Partylist	274,460	0.98	−0.49	1	0
Barangay Health Wellness	269,518	0.97	New	1	New
SAGIP Partylist	257,313	0.92	−0.31	1	New
Trade Union Congress Party	256,059	0.92	−0.52	1	0
Magdalo para sa Pilipino	253,536	0.91	+0.05	1	0
Galing sa Puso Party	249,484	0.89	New	1	New
Manila Teachers Party-List	249,416	0.89	+0.06	1	0
Rebolusyonaryong Alyansa Makabansa	238,150	0.85	+0.38	1	New
Anakalusugan	237,629	0.85	+0.26	1	New
Ako Padayon Pilipino	235,112	0.84	New	1	New
AAMBIS-Owa Party List	234,552	0.84	−0.69	1	0
Kusug Tausug	228,224	0.82	+0.06	1	0
DUMPER Partylist	223,199	0.80	+0.78	1	New
TGP Partylist	217,525	0.78	+0.51	1	New
Patrol Partylist	216,653	0.78	New	1	New
Anak Mindanao	212,323	0.76	−1.42	1	−1
AGAP Partylist	208,752	0.75	−1.08	1	0
LPG Marketers Association	208,219	0.75	−0.69	1	0
OFW Family Club	200,881	0.72	+0.09	1	New
Kabalikat ng Mamamayan	198,571	0.71	−1.89	1	−1
Democratic Independent Workers Association	196,385	0.70	−0.74	1	New
Kabataan	195,837	0.70	−0.23	1	0
Aksyon Magsasaka-Partido Tinig ng Masa	191,804	0.69	New	0	0
Serbisyo sa Bayan Party	180,535	0.65	−0.22	0	−1
Angkla Partylist	179,909	0.65	−0.39	0	−1
Akbayan	173,356	0.62	−1.26	0	−1
Wow Pilipinas Movement	172,080	0.62	New	0	0
Ina na Nagmamahal sa Anak	170,019	0.61	New	0	0
YACAP Partylist	167,826	0.60	−0.86	0	−1
Abante Mindanao	166,883	0.60	−0.05	0	0
Butil Farmers Party	164,412	0.59	−0.63	0	−1
Append Partylist	158,003	0.57	New	0	0
Anakpawis	146,511	0.53	−0.60	0	−1
ANAC-IP Partylist	144,291	0.52	−0.46	0	−1
Ang Nars	141,263	0.51	−0.17	0	0
PBB Party List	136,093	0.49	New	0	0
Kasosyo Partylist	134,795	0.48	New	0	0
AGRI Partylist	133,505	0.48	−2.10	0	−2
Acts-OFW Partylist	131,865	0.47	−0.69	0	−1
Ating Koop	131,344	0.47	+0.10	0	0
Ang Mata'y Alagaan	128,201	0.46	−0.56	0	−1
1-CARE Partylist	127,867	0.46	New	0	−1
Murang Kuryente Partylist	127,530	0.46	New	0	0
Una ang Edukasyon	119,646	0.43	−0.43	0	−1
PEACE Partylist	119,211	0.43	New	0	0
Association of Lady Entrepreneurs	113,134	0.41	New	0	0
Aangat Tayo	109,939	0.39	−0.36	0	−1
Ako An Bisaya	109,463	0.39	−0.11	0	0
Abante Pilipinas	97,114	0.35	New	0	0
Alay Buhay Partylist	94,320	0.34	−0.24	0	0
GLOBAL Partylist	89,775	0.32	−0.04	0	0
COMSLA Partylist	88,075	0.32	−0.34	0	0
Abe Kapampangan	83,379	0.30	New	0	0
NASECORE Partylist	81,141	0.29	New	0	0
Philippine National Police Retirees Association	79,818	0.29	New	0	0
Kilusang Maypagasa	79,358	0.28	New	0	0
Juan Movement	76,769	0.28	New	0	0
Tanggol Maralita	76,428	0.27	−0.15	0	0
Aasenso Partylist	74,722	0.27	−0.64	0	−1
1AAP Party-list	74,465	0.27	New	0	0
Ang Kabuhayan	74,229	0.27	−0.81	0	−1
Agbiag! Timpuyog Ilocano	70,318	0.25	−0.49	0	−1
Abakada Guro	69,257	0.25	−0.42	0	0
Alliance of Philippine Fishing Federations	69,138	0.25	−0.43	0	0
Ang Laban ng Indiginong Filipino	68,805	0.25	−0.77	0	0
Laang Kawal ng Pilipinas	68,333	0.25	New	0	0
Sinag Tungo sa Kaunlaran	61,696	0.22	+0.03	0	0
People's Champ Guardians	60,448	0.22	New	0	0
Luntiang Pilipinas Partylist	59,096	0.21	New	0	0
GRECON Partylist	58,561	0.21	New	0	0
ANUPA Partylist	54,767	0.20	+0.14	0	0
Ako Bisdak-Bisayang Dako	51,228	0.18	New	0	0
KOOP-KAMPI	50,889	0.18	New	0	0
UNIDO Partylist	45,710	0.16	+0.01	0	0
1-Lambat Partylist	44,181	0.16	New	0	0
Ako Ayoko sa Bawal na Droga	43,583	0.16	New	0	0
Barangay Natin	40,899	0.15	+0.05	0	0
1-United Transport Koalisyon	36,285	0.13	New	0	0
AMEPA OFW Access Center	35,373	0.13	−0.24	0	0
ASEAN Partylist	32,464	0.12	−0.27	0	0
ABS Partylist	31,394	0.11	−0.82	0	−1
Sulong Dignidad Party	29,830	0.11	New	0	0
Kabalikat ng Nagkakaisang Manileño	29,187	0.10	New	0	0
Parents Teacher Alliance	28,908	0.10	New	0	0
Partido Lakas ng Masa	28,824	0.10	New	0	0
Partido ng Manggagawa	28,351	0.10	New	0	0
METRO Partylist	28,261	0.10	−0.19	0	0
1-AHAPO Partylist	26,564	0.10	−0.07	0	0
Ang Tao Muna at Bayan	25,946	0.09	+0.00	0	0
Alliance of Volunteer Educators	25,025	0.09	−0.40	0	0
AWAKE Partylist	24,780	0.09	+0.00	0	0
UTAP Bicol	22,948	0.08	New	0	0
One Philippines	21,974	0.08	New	0	0
Partido Sandugo	19,649	0.07	New	0	0
Buklod Filipino	18,297	0.07	New	0	0
FICTAP Party List	16,038	0.06	−0.05	0	0
TRICAP Partylist	15,731	0.06	−0.10	0	0
Tinderong Pinoy Party	14,580	0.05	−0.09	0	0
Pilipinas para sa Pinoy	13,848	0.05	New	0	0
Kaisahan ng mga Maliliit na Magsasaka	12,061	0.04	−0.09	0	0
Marvelous Tayo	11,751	0.04	New	0	0
Filipino Family Party	10,589	0.04	New	0	0
Alliance of Public Transport Organization	8,883	0.03	New	0	0
KAMAIS Partylist	7,571	0.03	New	0	0
SAMAKO Martylist	6,344	0.02	New	0	0
Total	27,884,790	100.00	–	61	+2
Valid votes	27,884,790	58.96	−13.02		
Invalid/blank votes	19,411,652	41.04	+13.02		
Total votes	47,296,442	100.00	–		
Registered voters/turnout	63,643,263	74.31	−6.39		
Source: COMELEC

Vote share
ACT-CIS	9.51%
Bayan Muna	4.01%
Ako Bikol	3.76%
CIBAC	3.33%
Ang Probinsyano	2.76%
1-PACMAN	2.56%
MARINO	2.44%
Probinsyano Ako	2.26%
Senior Citizens	1.85%
Others	67.50%

Party-list seats
ACT-CIS	5.00%
Bayan Muna	5.00%
Ako Bikol	3.33%
CIBAC	3.33%
Ang Probinsyano	3.33%
1-PACMAN	3.33%
MARINO	3.33%
Probinsyano Ako	3.33%
Senior Citizens	1.67%
Others	70.00%

=== Summary ===
Region	Seats won per party							Total seats
Region	PDP–Laban	Nacionalista	NPC	NUP	Liberal	Lakas	Others & ind.	Total seats
I	4 / 12	2 / 12	2 / 12	0 / 12	0 / 12	2 / 12	0 / 12	12 / 304
II	5 / 12	1 / 12	2 / 12	2 / 12	0 / 12	0 / 12	2 / 12	12 / 304
III	9 / 21	1 / 21	3 / 21	4 / 21	1 / 21	1 / 21	2 / 21	21 / 304
IV–A	7 / 28	9 / 28	4 / 28	5 / 28	1 / 28	1 / 28	1 / 28	28 / 304
IV–B	2 / 8	1 / 8	0 / 8	1 / 8	2 / 8	0 / 8	2 / 8	8 / 304
V	6 / 16	2 / 16	4 / 16	1 / 16	2 / 16	0 / 16	1 / 16	16 / 304
VI	2 / 19	5 / 19	6 / 19	4 / 19	1 / 19	1 / 19	0 / 19	19 / 304
VII	4 / 17	2 / 17	4 / 17	1 / 17	3 / 17	2 / 17	1 / 17	17 / 304
VIII	5 / 12	0 / 12	0 / 12	1 / 12	2 / 12	2 / 12	2 / 12	12 / 304
IX (Note: Basilan has places both in the Zamboanga Peninsula (Isabela) and in Bangsamoro (rest of the province). For purposes of this table, it is included in the Bangsamoro totals.)	5 / 9	1 / 9	2 / 9	0 / 9	1 / 9	0 / 9	0 / 9	9 / 304
X	4 / 14	3 / 14	1 / 14	2 / 14	0 / 14	1 / 14	3 / 14	14 / 304
XI	4 / 11	2 / 11	1 / 11	0 / 11	0 / 11	0 / 11	4 / 11	11 / 304
XII	5 / 8	2 / 8	0 / 8	1 / 8	0 / 8	0 / 8	0 / 8	8 / 304
XIII	4 / 9	2 / 9	0 / 9	2 / 9	0 / 9	1 / 9	0 / 9	9 / 304
BARMM	3 / 8	2 / 8	0 / 8	1 / 8	1 / 8	1 / 8	0 / 8	8 / 304
CAR	1 / 7	2 / 7	3 / 7	0 / 7	0 / 7	0 / 7	1 / 7	7 / 304
NCR	12 / 32	3 / 32	6 / 32	0 / 32	4 / 32	0 / 32	7 / 32	32 / 304
Party-list	0 / 61	0 / 61	0 / 61	0 / 61	0 / 61	0 / 61	61 / 61	61 / 304
Total	82 / 304	42 / 304	37 / 304	25 / 304	18 / 304	12 / 304	88 / 304	304 / 304

== Defeated incumbents ==
=== District representatives ===
District	Incumbent's party	Incumbent	Winner	Winner's party	Notes
Malabon	PDP–Laban	Federico Sandoval II	Josephine Lacson-Noel	NPC	Lacson-Noel was term-limited in 2016.
Nueva Ecija–4th	NUP	Magnolia Antonino-Nadres	Maricel Natividad-Nagaño	PRP	
Pangasinan–5th	PDP–Laban	Amado Espino Jr.	Ramon Guico III	Lakas	
Pasig	Nacionalista	Richard Eusebio	Roman Romulo	Aksyon	
Siquijor	PDP–Laban	Ramon Vicente Rocamora	Jake Vincent Villa	NPC	
Taguig–Pateros–1st	PDP–Laban	Arnel Cerafica	Alan Peter Cayetano	Nacionalista	
Tawi-Tawi	PDP–Laban	Ruby Sahali	Rashidin Matba	NUP	

=== Party-list representatives ===
- Serbisyo sa Bayan Party
  - Ricky Belmonte
- Angkla
  - Jesulito Manalo
- Akbayan
  - Tomasito Villarin
- YACAP
  - Benhur Lopez Jr.
- Butil
  - Cecilia Leonila Chavez
- Anakpawis
  - Ariel Casilao
- ANAC-IP
  - Jose Panganiban Jr.
- AGRI
  - Delphine Lee
  - Orestes Salon
- MATA
  - Tricia Nicole Velasco-Catera
- 1-CARE
  - Carlos Roman Uybarreta
- 1-ANG EDUKASYON
  - Salvador Belaro Jr.
- Aangat Tayo
  - Harlin Neil Abayon III
- AASENSO
  - Teodoro Montoro
- Agbiag!
  - Michelle Antonio
- ABS
  - Ulysses Garces
