= 2022 Philippine House of Representatives elections in Eastern Visayas =

- May 9, 2022
- All 13 Eastern Visayas seats in the House of Representatives
Party	Seats	+/–
PDP–Laban	4	−1
NUP	4	+3
Nacionalista	3	+3
Lakas	2	+1
This lists parties that won seats. See the complete results below.

The 2022 Philippine House of Representatives elections in Eastern Visayas were held on May 9, 2022.

== Summary ==
Congressional district	Incumbent	Incumbent's party	Winner	Winner's party	Winning margin
Biliran	Gerardo Espina Jr.	Lakas	Gerardo Espina Jr.	Lakas	Unopposed
Eastern Samar	Maria Fe Abunda	PDP–Laban	Maria Fe Abunda	PDP–Laban	89.18%
Leyte–1st	Martin Romualdez	Lakas	Martin Romualdez	Lakas	Unopposed
Leyte–2nd	Lolita Javier	Nacionalista	Lolita Javier	Nacionalista	45.59%
Leyte–3rd	Vicente Veloso III	NPC	Anna Veloso-Tuazon	NUP	Unopposed
Leyte–4th	Lucy Torres-Gomez	PDP–Laban	Richard Gomez	PDP–Laban	11.62%
Leyte–5th	Carl Cari	PDP–Laban	Carl Cari	PDP–Laban	Unopposed
Northern Samar–1st	Paul Daza	NUP	Paul Daza	NUP	30.44%
Northern Samar–2nd	Jose Ong Jr.	NUP	Harris Ongchuan	NUP	75.04%
Samar–1st	Edgar Mary Sarmiento	NUP	Stephen James Tan	Nacionalista	17.72%
Samar–2nd	Sharee Ann Tan	Nacionalista	Reynolds Michael Tan	Nacionalista	32.42%
Southern Leyte–1st	New seat		Luz Mercado	NUP	76.18%
Southern Leyte–2nd	New seat		Christopherson Yap	PDP–Laban	21.94%

== Biliran ==
Incumbent Gerardo Espina Jr. of Lakas–CMD won re-election for a second term unopposed.

Candidate	Party	Votes	%
Gerardo Espina Jr. (incumbent)	Lakas–CMD	74,502	100.00
Total		74,502	100.00
Total votes		103,359	–
Registered voters/turnout		123,232	83.87
Lakas hold			
Source: Commission on Elections

== Eastern Samar ==
Incumbent Maria Fe Abunda of PDP–Laban ran for a second term.

Abunda won re-election against Febida Padel (Independent).

Candidate	Party	Votes	%
Maria Fe Abunda (incumbent)	PDP–Laban	220,111	94.59
Febida Padel	Independent	12,593	5.41
Total		232,704	100.00
Total votes		293,098	–
Registered voters/turnout		347,616	84.32
PDP–Laban hold			
Source: Commission on Elections

== Leyte ==
=== 1st district ===
Incumbent Martin Romualdez of Lakas–CMD won re-election for a second term unopposed.

Candidate	Party	Votes	%
Martin Romualdez (incumbent)	Lakas–CMD	181,415	100.00
Total		181,415	100.00
Total votes		284,496	–
Registered voters/turnout		328,387	86.63
Lakas hold			
Source: Commission on Elections

=== 2nd district ===
Incumbent Lolita Javier of the Nacionalista Party ran for a second term.

Javier won re-election against former representative Henry Ong (PDP–Laban) and two other candidates.

Candidate	Party	Votes	%
Lolita Javier (incumbent)	Nacionalista Party	151,617	71.05
Henry Ong	PDP–Laban	54,343	25.46
Alberto Hidalgo	Independent	5,215	2.44
Dominic Babante	Partido Federal ng Pilipinas	2,229	1.04
Total		213,404	100.00
Total votes		260,074	–
Registered voters/turnout		295,383	88.05
Nacionalista hold			
Source: Commission on Elections

=== 3rd district ===
Incumbent Vicente Veloso III of the National Unity Party (NUP) retired.

The NUP nominated Veloso's daughter, provincial board member Anna Veloso-Tuazon, who won the election unopposed.

Candidate	Party	Votes	%
Anna Veloso-Tuazon	National Unity Party	53,457	100.00
Total		53,457	100.00
Total votes		115,003	–
Registered voters/turnout		131,736	87.30
NUP hold			
Source: Commission on Elections

=== 4th district ===
Term-limited incumbent Lucy Torres-Gomez of PDP–Laban ran for mayor of Ormoc.

PDP–Laban nominated Torres-Gomez' husband, Ormoc mayor Richard Gomez, who won the election against former Commission on Elections commissioner Goyo Larrazabal (Independent).

Candidate	Party	Votes	%
Richard Gomez	PDP–Laban	148,941	55.81
Goyo Larrazabal	Independent	117,912	44.19
Total		266,853	100.00
Total votes		287,184	–
Registered voters/turnout		325,491	88.23
PDP–Laban hold			
Source: Commission on Elections

=== 5th district ===
Incumbent Carl Cari of PDP–Laban won re-election for a second term unopposed.

Candidate	Party	Votes	%
Carl Cari (incumbent)	PDP–Laban	172,023	100.00
Total		172,023	100.00
Total votes		230,249	–
Registered voters/turnout		269,870	85.32
PDP–Laban hold			
Source: Commission on Elections

== Northern Samar ==
=== 1st district ===
Incumbent Paul Daza of the National Unity Party ran for a second term.

Daza won re-election against former Development Bank of the Philippines board director Teodoro Jumamil (People's Reform Party), former provincial board member Joma Vicario (PDP–Laban) and two other candidates.

Candidate	Party	Votes	%
Paul Daza (incumbent)	National Unity Party	107,510	58.75
Teodoro Jumamil	People's Reform Party	51,804	28.31
Joma Vicario	PDP–Laban	21,348	11.67
Esteban Sosing	Independent	1,166	0.64
Essie Unay	Independent	1,164	0.64
Total		182,992	100.00
Total votes		214,355	–
Registered voters/turnout		251,939	85.08
NUP hold			
Source: Commission on Elections

=== 2nd district ===
Incumbent Jose Ong Jr. of the National Unity Party (NUP) retired.

The NUP nominated Ong's nephew, Laoang mayor Harris Ongchuan, who won against two other candidates.

Candidate	Party	Votes	%
Harris Ongchuan	National Unity Party	93,488	85.63
George Lucero	Independent	11,565	10.59
Leticia Siervo	PROMDI	4,118	3.77
Total		109,171	100.00
Total votes		153,231	–
Registered voters/turnout		201,681	75.98
NUP hold			
Source: Commission on Elections

== Samar ==
=== 1st district ===
Incumbent Edgar Mary Sarmiento of the National Unity Party ran for a third term.

Sarmiento was defeated by former Samar vice governor Stephen James Tan of the Nacionalista Party.

Candidate	Party	Votes	%
Stephen James Tan	Nacionalista Party	132,436	58.86
Edgar Mary Sarmiento (incumbent)	National Unity Party	92,561	41.14
Total		224,997	100.00
Total votes		232,253	–
Registered voters/turnout		260,534	89.14
Nacionalista gain from NUP			
Source: Commission on Elections

=== 2nd district ===
Incumbent Sharee Ann Tan of the Nacionalista Party retired to run for governor of Samar.

The Nacionalista Party nominated Tan's brother, Samar governor Reynolds Michael Tan, who won the election against provincial board member Alvin Abejuela (National Unity Party).

Candidate	Party	Votes	%
Reynolds Michael Tan	Nacionalista Party	161,825	66.21
Alvin Abejuela	National Unity Party	82,590	33.79
Total		244,415	100.00
Total votes		279,015	–
Registered voters/turnout		336,756	82.85
Nacionalista hold			
Source: Commission on Elections

== Southern Leyte ==
=== 1st district ===
As a result of Southern Leyte's redistricting in 2019, the district was created with the municipalities of Bontoc, Limasawa, Maasin, Macrohon, Malitbog, Padre Burgos and Tomas Oppus. The district was intended to be contested for the first time during the elections in 2019, but was delayed to 2022, due to time constraints.

Luz Mercado (National Unity Party) won the election against Vicente Geraldo (Independent).

Candidate	Party	Votes	%
Luz Mercado	National Unity Party	74,693	88.09
Vicente Geraldo	Independent	10,094	11.91
Total		84,787	100.00
Total votes		116,426	–
Registered voters/turnout		133,753	87.05
NUP gain			
Source: Commission on Elections

=== 2nd district ===
As a result of Southern Leyte's redistricting in 2019, the district was created with the municipalities of Anahawan, Hinunangan, Hinundayan, Libagon, Liloan, Pintuyan, Saint Bernard, San Francisco, San Juan, San Ricardo, Silago and Sogod. The district was intended to be contested for the first time during the elections in 2019, but was delayed to 2022, due to time constraints.

Southern Leyte vice governor Christopherson Yap (PDP–Laban) won the election against former provincial board member Junbie Fernandez (PROMDI) and four other candidates.

Candidate	Party	Votes	%
Christopherson Yap	PDP–Laban	63,979	56.74
Junbie Fernandez	PROMDI	39,246	34.80
Alex Cuaton	Partido Federal ng Pilipinas	4,340	3.85
Vick Barcelon	Independent	3,739	3.32
Lolong Maupoy	Independent	914	0.81
Mig Caturan	Independent	546	0.48
Total		112,764	100.00
Total votes		137,733	–
Registered voters/turnout		159,882	86.15
PDP–Laban gain			
Source: Commission on Elections
