= Ongchuan =

Ongchuan is a surname. notable people with the surname include:

- Edwin Ongchuan (born 1968), Filipino politician
- Harris Ongchuan (fl. from 2025), Filipino politician

== See also ==
- Onchan
