= Governor of Northern Samar =

Local chief executive

- Gobernador ng Hilagang Samar (Filipino)
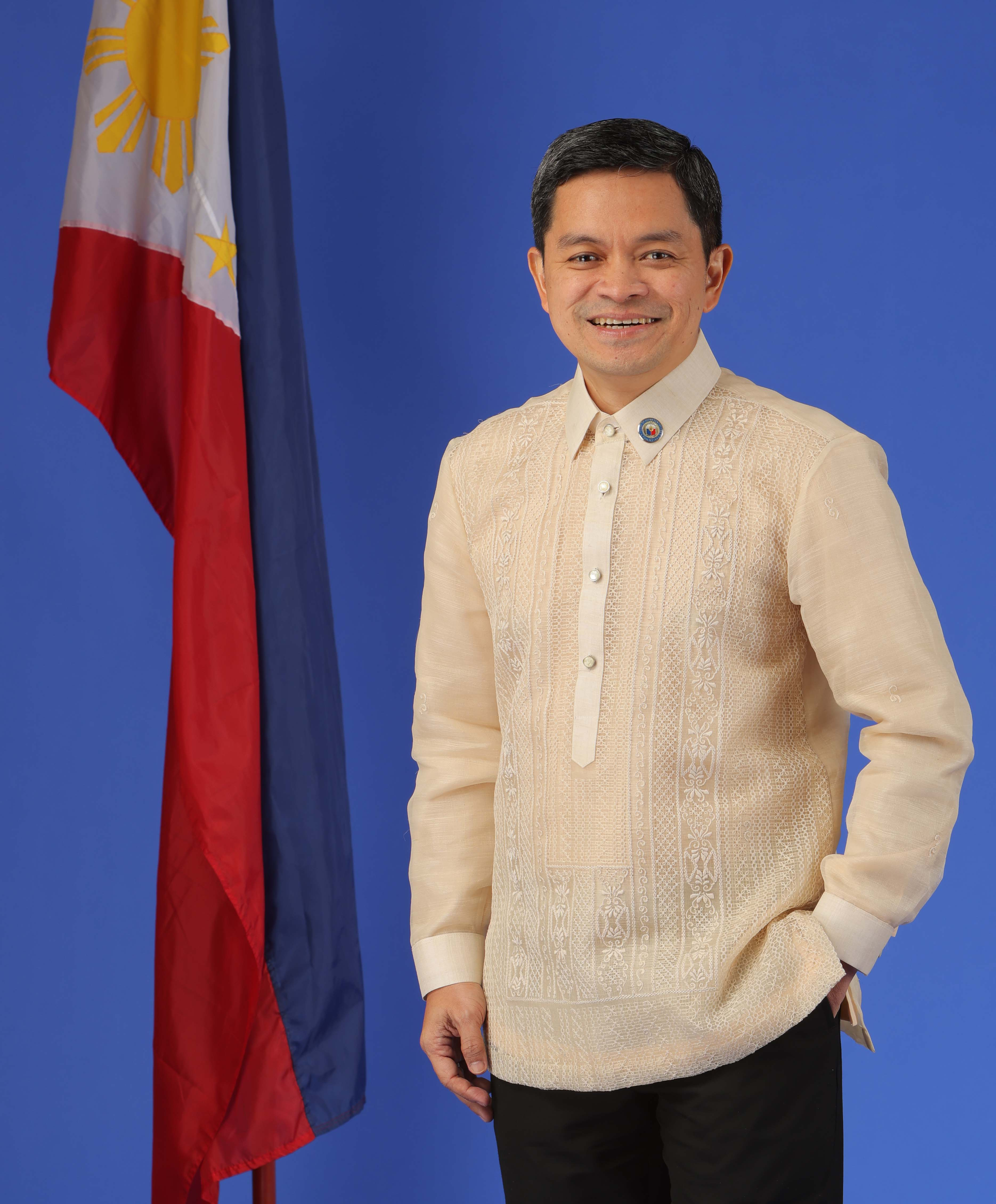
- Incumbent; Harris Ongchuan since June 30, 2025
- Style: The Honourable
- Seat: Northern Samar Provincial Capitol, Catarman
- Term length: 3 years, not eligible for re-election immediately after three consecutive terms
- Inaugural holder: Irene Balite
- Formation: November 14, 1967

The governor of Northern Samar is the local chief executive of the Philippine province of Northern Samar, Philippines.

== List ==
No.	Image	Governor	Term start	Term end	Note
1		Irene Balite	December 30, 1967	December 30, 1971	Inaugural governor; first female governor
2		Edilberto del Valle	December 30, 1971	March 2, 1980	First male governor
3		Reynaldo del Valle	March 3, 1980	March 23, 1986	
–		Justiniano Singson	March 25, 1986	February 1, 1988	Officer in Charge
4		Harlin Abayon	February 2, 1988	June 30, 1998	First governor elected under the 1987 Constitution
5		Madeleine Ong	June 30, 1998	June 30, 2001	Second female governor
6		Raul Daza	June 30, 2001	June 30, 2010	
7		Paul Daza	June 30, 2010	June 30, 2013	Son of Raul Daza
8		Jose Ong Jr.	June 30, 2013	June 30, 2019	Brother-in-law of Madeleine Ong
9		Edwin Ongchuan	June 30, 2019	June 30, 2025	Son of former Congressman Emil Ong
10		Harris Ongchuan	June 30, 2025	present	Son of former Governor Madeleine Ong
