= Mel Senen Sarmiento =

Filipino politician (born 1962)

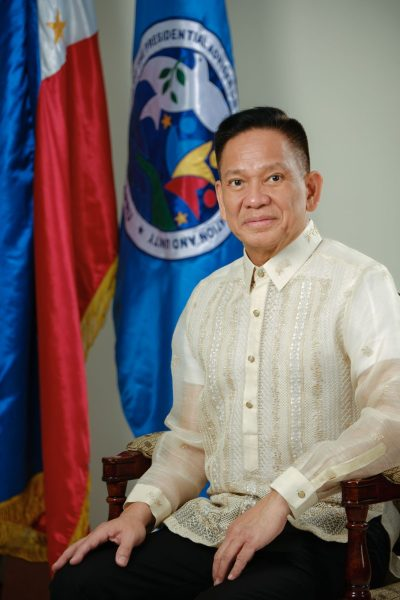
- Official portrait, 2026

Presidential Adviser on Peace, Reconciliation and Unity
- Incumbent
- Assumed office April 21, 2026
- President: Bongbong Marcos
- Preceded by: Carlito Galvez Jr.

Secretary of the Interior and Local Government
- In office September 11, 2015 – June 30, 2016
- President: Benigno Aquino III
- Preceded by: Manuel Roxas II
- Succeeded by: Ismael Sueno

Member of the Philippine House of Representatives from Samar's 1st District
- In office June 30, 2010 – September 10, 2015
- Preceded by: Reynaldo S. Uy
- Succeeded by: Edgar Mary S. Sarmiento

Mayor of Calbayog
- In office June 30, 2001 – June 30, 2010
- Preceded by: Reynaldo S. Uy
- Succeeded by: Reynaldo S. Uy

Vice Mayor of Calbayog
- In office June 30, 1992 – June 30, 1995

Personal details
- Born: Mel Senen Sevilla Sarmiento; August 11, 1962 (age 64) Manila, Philippines
- Party: Liberal (2009–present)
- Other political affiliations: Lakas (until 2009)
- Occupation: Businessman
- Profession: Politician

Mel Senen Sevilla Sarmiento (born August 11, 1962) is a Filipino politician. He was a member of the Philippine House of Representatives representing the 1st Legislative District of Samar from 2010 to 2015. He also served as Secretary-General of the Liberal Party. He served as the Vice Mayor of Calbayog from 1992 to 1995 and Mayor from 2004 to 2011 before the death of Congressman Uy. He was also the Secretary General of the League of Cities of the Philippines from 2004 to 2010. He also served as the last Secretary of the Interior and Local Government under President Benigno Aquino III after Jesse Robredo and Mar Roxas.

== Early life and political career (1992–2010) ==
Sarmiento was born in Manila to Engr. Oscar Sarmiento of Calbayog and Teresita Sevilla of Roxas City. He began his public service when he was vice mayor of Calbayog from 1992 to 1995. Prior to that, he was an active member of the Rotary Club in Samar. Unsuccessful in his bid for the mayoralty the following term, he took a break from politics for 6 years, during which time he ran his own construction firm.

In 2004–2010, he ran and won as Mayor of Calbayog. He then became a substitute of Congressman Uy, and Aquino as Mayor. He also represented League of Cities of the Philippines as secretary general.

== House of Representatives (2010–2015) ==
Sarmiento was elected as representative of the first district of Western Samar during the 15th Congress. While on his first term, he was Vice Chairman of the Committee on National Defense and Committee on Public Order and Safety. On his second term, he was appointed Vice Chairman of the Committee on Millennium Development Goals and Transportation. He resigned his seat following his appointment as Secretary of the Interior and Local Government in September 2015.

While in Congress, he authored and co-authored several house bills and republic acts, namely:

- House Bill No. 00084 – The Real Property Valuation and Assessment Reform Act
- House Bill No. 03527 – The Philippine Disaster Risk Reduction and Management Act of 2010, an act amending section 21 of Republic Act of 10121
- Republic Act No. 10364 – An Anti-Trafficking in Persons Act of 2003
- Republic Act No. 10630, – Juvenile Justice and Welfare Act of 2006 A consolidation of Senate Bill No. 3324 and House Bill No. 6052. An Act Strengthening the Juvenile Justice System in the Philippines, amending for the purpose known as the Juvenile Justice and Welfare Act of 2006,

Commission on Appointments (2013–2015)

During his time as a member of Congress, Sarmiento was the Vice Chairman of the Commission on Appointments and headed the House Contingent. The commission on appointments (CA) is a body that reviews, confirms or disapproves appointments made by the President to ensure only those who are qualified are appointed.

Other appointments

- Chairman, Phil Army Multi-Sector Advisory Board
- Vice-Chairman, AFP Multi-Sector Governance Council
- Director, Institute for Solidarity in Asia
- Director, SOS Children's Villages Philippines
- Member, Civil Service Multi-Sector Advisory Council

== Peace adviser ==
In 2026, Sarmiento was appointed as Presidential Adviser on Peace, Reconciliation, and Unity by president Bongbong Marcos.

== Awards, honors, and recognition ==
In December 2007, Sarmiento received the Konrad Adenauer Medal of Excellence (KAME IV) and was conferred by the Ambassador of Germany, H. E. Axel Weishaupt at Manila Hotel.

== United Nations ==
Sarmiento is a member of the Advisory Group of Parliamentarians of the United Nations International Strategy for Disaster Reduction (UNISDR). He represented the Philippine delegation for The Third UN World Conference on Disaster Risk Reduction(WCDRR). The WCDRR serves as a venue to gather policymakers and parliamentarians to share knowledge and best practices on disaster risk reduction and resilience.

== Personal life ==
Sarmiento was briefly engaged to Kris Aquino in 2021. Aquino had publicised her relationship with him in August, a month after the death of her brother Benigno Simeon III.

House of Representatives of the Philippines
| Preceded by Reynaldo S. Uy | Member of the House of Representatives from Samar's 1st district 2010–2016 | Succeeded by Edgar Mary S. Sarmiento |
Political offices
| Preceded by Mar Roxas | Secretary of the Interior and Local Government; 2015–2016 | Succeeded by Ismael Sueno |
| Preceded by Carlito Galvez Jr. | Presidential Adviser on Peace, Reconciliation and Unity; 2026–present | Incumbent |
