= Raul Daza =

Filipino lawyer and politician (1935–2026)

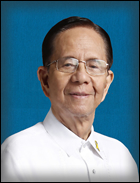
- Official portrait, 2016

Speaker pro tempore/ Deputy Speaker of the Philippine House of Representatives
- In office July 27, 1992 – June 30, 1998
- Speaker: Ramon Mitra Jr. Jose de Venecia Jr.
- Preceded by: Antonio Cuenco (as Speaker pro tempore)
- Succeeded by: Eduardo Gullas (as Deputy Speaker for Visayas)

Member of the Philippine House of Representatives from Northern Samar
- In office May 16, 2016 – June 30, 2019
- Preceded by: Harlin Abayon
- Succeeded by: Paul Daza
- Constituency: 1st district
- In office June 30, 2010 – June 30, 2013
- Preceded by: Paul Daza
- Succeeded by: Harlin Abayon
- Constituency: 1st district
- In office June 30, 1987 – June 30, 1998
- Preceded by: Newly created
- Succeeded by: Harlin Abayon
- Constituency: 1st district
- In office December 30, 1969 – January 17, 1973
- Preceded by: Eusebio Moore
- Succeeded by: Office abolished
- Constituency: at-large district

Governor of Northern Samar
- In office June 30, 2001 – June 30, 2010
- Preceded by: Madeleine Ong
- Succeeded by: Paul Daza

Deputy Minister of the Presidential Commission on Good Government
- In office 1986–1987
- President: Corazon Aquino
- Minister: Jovito Salonga

Commissioner of the Presidential Commission on Constitutional Reforms
- In office 1999–2000
- President: Joseph Estrada

11th President of the Liberal Party
- In office October 18, 1994 – September 19, 1999
- Preceded by: Wigberto Tañada
- Succeeded by: Florencio Abad

Personal details
- Born: May 2, 1935
- Died: October 12, 2026 (aged 91)
- Party: Liberal (1969-2026)
- Other political affiliations: Nacionalista (1967–1969)
- Spouse: Teresita Ruiz
- Children: 4 include Paul
- Education: University of the Philippines Diliman (LLB); University of the East (MBA)
- Occupation: Politician, civil servant

Raul Aguila Daza (May 2, 1935 – October 12, 2026) was a Filipino lawyer, certified public accountant, and politician who served in the Philippine House of Representatives for 20 years as representative of Northern Samar's 1st congressional district from 1987 to 1998, 2010 to 2013, and 2016 to 2019. He was also a three-term governor of the same province from 2001 to 2010, and represented Northern Samar's at-large district in the House from 1969 until 1973.

== Early life and education ==
Raul Daza was born on May 2, 1935. He attended the University of the Philippines (UP) High School in Quezon City.

He obtained his business administration degree at the University of the East, and his law degree at UP Diliman. He passed the bar examinations in 1957 and placed 11th place. He became a practicing lawyer in both the Philippines and the United States.

== Political career ==
=== House of Representatives (1969–1973) ===
Daza entered active politics in 1967, when he ran in the special election for representative of the then lone district of Northern Samar to fill the unexpired term of representative Eladio Balite, who had died. He lost to vice governor Eusebio Moore, a fellow candidate of the ruling Nacionalista Party. However, in the 1969 regular national elections, as the candidate of the opposition Liberal Party, he beat Moore for the same position and was elected congressman. He held office in the 7th Congress from December 1969 to January 1973, when Congress was abolished by President Ferdinand Marcos, who assumed dictatorial powers under a new constitution after declaring martial law throughout the country on September 21, 1972.

Daza joined a group of legislators in a case filed in the Supreme Court to question the constitutionality of the Marcos's declaration of martial law and campaigned against the so-called ratification of the new constitution. After Marcos anomalously declared the effectivity of his constitution, Daza became one of the 10 congressmen of the 105-member House of Representatives, who did not sign the option under the constitution to serve in the so-called national assembly.

=== Exile and return (1973–1987) ===
Facing imminent arrest, he fled to the United States on January 23, 1973, where later he sought and was granted political asylum by the U.S. government. Within the year his wife and children followed him, and the House of Representatives was abolished by President Ferdinand Marcos. In the U.S. Daza led opposition groups from his residence in Los Angeles, California.

After Ninoy Aquino's assassination, he returned to the Philippines on August 12, 1985, although he had a pending arrest warrant. In August 1985, President Marcos stated Daza and other opponents living abroad may return to the Philippines but "must face any charges against them." Daza returned to the Philippines the following week with 14 other opposition leaders. One day after his arrival, he was put under arrest and forthwith arraigned before a Quezon City court on an indictment charging him for multiple violations of the Marcos-era anti-subversion law.

Upon arrival, Daza told reporters "Our motherland is in her darkest hour... the time has come for all true Filipinos, whether here or abroad, and regardless of class, calling or roots, to rally around her." At arrival, he faced charges of subversion, arson, and homicide in connection with his alleged involvement with the "Light-A-Fire Movement." Former Senator Jovito Salonga, who had returned earlier that year, told reporters that Daza would play a key role in organizing the Liberal Party for the elections.

Granted bail due to pressure from a group of U.S. senators, he joined the opposition "parliament of the streets" and campaigned for Ninoy's widow Cory Aquino against Marcos in the snap election on February 7, 1986.

In 1986, he was appointed by Corazon Aquino as deputy minister of the Presidential Commission on Good Government and at the same time a governor until 1987 when he announced his candidacy as representative of first district of Northern Samar.

=== Return to the House of Representatives (1987–1992) ===
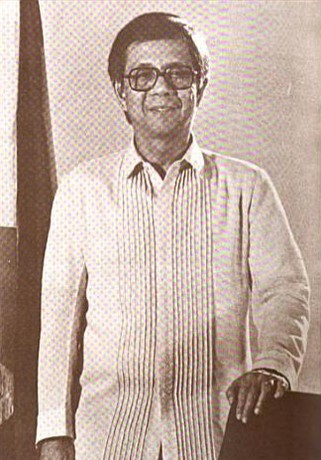
Daza's official portrait during the 8th Congress.

After the restoration of the House of Representatives, he successfully ran for Northern Samar's 1st congressional district seat.

=== Speaker pro tempore and deputy speaker (1992–1998) ===
During the opening of the 9th Congress, he was eventually elected as speaker pro tempore succeeding Antonio Cuenco. By 1995, he became deputy speaker for the Visayas until 1998. He also became the president of Liberal Party in 1994 succeeding Wigberto Tañada. He held that position until 1998.

=== Governor of Northern Samar (2001–2010) ===
After his tenure as congressman, he was appointed Commissioner of the Presidential Commission on Constitutional Reforms from 1999 to 2000. In 2001, he won as governor of Northern Samar. He was re-elected in 2004 and 2007.

=== House of Representatives (2010–2013, 2016–2019) ===
Daza was elected congressman again in 2010 and regained his seat from his son Paul after he swapped places with the latter. In 2013, he lost his congressional seat to Harlin Abayon. In 2016, he regained the seat from Abayon after the latter was disqualified by the House of Representatives Electoral Tribunal. This was reversed by the Supreme Court, but speaker Feliciano Belmonte Jr. did not heed the court's decision and paved way for Daza's return. During his return as congressman, he was part of the minority at age 82 after President Rodrigo Duterte's party PDP–Laban gained a supermajority in the House.

== Personal life and death ==
Daza married Teresita Ruiz with whom he had four children. The Dazas are a political family with son Paul and grandson Nico Raul growing up to become provincial politicians.

Daza died on October 12, 2026, at the age of 91 due to a lingering illness.

== Electoral history ==
Electoral history of Raul Daza
Year	Office	Party	Votes received				Result
Year	Office	Party	Total	%	P.	Swing	Result
1967	Representative (Northern Samar–Lone)	Nacionalista	12,110	31.45%	2nd	—N/a	Lost
1969	Representative (Northern Samar–Lone)	Liberal	—N/a	—N/a	1st	—N/a	Won
1987	Representative (Northern Samar–1st)	Liberal	—N/a	—N/a	1st	—N/a	Won
1992	Representative (Northern Samar–1st)	Liberal	38,990	60.98%	1st	—N/a	Won
1995	Representative (Northern Samar–1st)	Liberal	2,565	—N/a	1st	—N/a	Won
2010	Representative (Northern Samar–1st)	Liberal	79,880	59.85%	1st	—N/a	Won
2013	Representative (Northern Samar–1st)	Liberal	72,805	49.98%	2nd	-9.87	Lost
2016	Representative (Northern Samar–1st)	Liberal	80,157	50.01%	1st	+0.03	Won
2001	Governor of Northern Samar	Liberal	93,366	55.97%	1st	—N/a	Won
2004	Governor of Northern Samar	Liberal	110,681	74.41%	1st	+18.44	Won
2007	Governor of Northern Samar	Liberal	101,819	50.85%	1st	-23.56	Won

House of Representatives of the Philippines
Preceded by Antonio Cuenco	Speaker pro tempore of the House of Representatives; July 27, 1992 – June 30, 1995	Office abolished
New office	Deputy Speaker for Mindanao; July 24, 1995 – June 30, 19981	Succeeded by Eduardo Gullas
Preceded by Harlin Abayon	Member for Northern Samar's 1st district May 16, 2016 – June 30, 2019 (June 30, 2010 – June 30, 2013) (June 30, 1987 – June 30, 1998)	Succeeded by Paul Daza
Preceded by Paul Daza	Member for Northern Samar's 1st district May 16, 2016 – June 30, 2019 (June 30, 2010 – June 30, 2013) (June 30, 1987 – June 30, 1998)	Succeeded by Harlin Abayon
New office	Member for Northern Samar's 1st district May 16, 2016 – June 30, 2019 (June 30, 2010 – June 30, 2013) (June 30, 1987 – June 30, 1998)	Succeeded by Harlin Abayon
Preceded by Eusebio Moore	Member for Northern Samar's at-large district December 30, 1969 – January 17, 1973	Office abolished
Political offices
Preceded by Madeleine Ong	Governor of Northern Samar; June 30, 2001 – June 30, 2010	Succeeded by Paul Daza
Party political offices
Preceded by Wigberto Tañada	President of the Liberal Party; October 18, 1994 – September 19, 1999	Succeeded by Florencio Abad
