= Harris Ongchuan =

Filipino politician

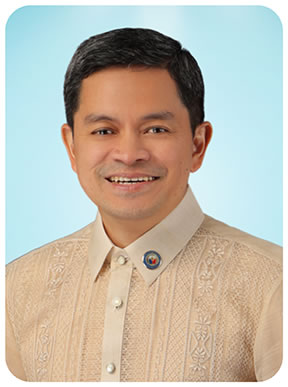
- Official portrait, 2022

10th Governor of Northern Samar
- Incumbent
- Assumed office June 30, 2025
- Vice Governor: Clarence Dato
- Preceded by: Edwin Ongchuan

Member of the House of Representatives for Northern Samar's 2nd District
- In office June 30, 2022 – June 30, 2025
- Preceded by: Jose L. Ong Jr.
- Succeeded by: Edwin Ongchuan

Personal details
- Born: Harris Christopher Mendoza Ongchuan
- Party: NUP (2021–present)
- Relations: Edwin Ongchuan (cousin)
- Occupation: Politician

Harris Christopher Mendoza Ongchuan is a Filipino politician who has served as 10th Governor of Northern Samar since 2025. He served as representative for 2nd District of the Northern Samar in the House of Representatives of the Philippines from 2022 to 2025.

== Electoral history ==
Electoral history of Harris Ongchuan
Year	Office	Party	Votes received				Result
Year	Office	Party	Total	%	P.	Swing	Result
2022	Representative (Northern Samar–2nd)	NUP	93,488	85.63%	1st	—N/a	Won
2025	Governor of Northern Samar	NUP	212,471	79.28%	1st	—N/a	Won

== See also ==
- List of current Philippine governors
