= Edgar Mary Sarmiento =

Filipino politician

The Honorable Edgar Mary S. Sarmiento

House Committee Chair on Transportation
- In office August 2019 – June 30, 2022
- President: Rodrigo Duterte
- Preceded by: Cesar Sarmiento

Member of the Philippine House of Representatives from Samar's 1st district
- In office June 30, 2016 – June 30, 2022
- Preceded by: Mel Senen Sarmiento
- Succeeded by: Stephen James T. Tan

Personal details
- Born: Edgar Mary Sevilla Sarmiento; January 12, 1959 (age 67) Catbalogan, Samar, Philippines
- Party: NUP (2018–present)
- Other political affiliations: Liberal (2015-2018)
- Spouse: Jennifer Helen
- Children: Andrew, Jasmin and Jennifer
- Relatives: Mel Senen Sarmiento (brother)
- Occupation: Civil Engineer, Businessman
- Profession: Politician
- Website: Official Website

Edgar Mary Sevilla Sarmiento (born January 12, 1959, Catbalogan, Samar, Philippines) was a member of the Philippine House of Representatives representing the 1st Legislative District of Samar from 2016 to 2022.

== Early career (2000–2016) ==
Sarmiento was born in Catbalogan, Samar to Engr. Oscar Sarmiento of Calbayog City and Teresita Sevilla of Roxas City. He is an engineer by profession. He translates the broad concept of nation-building by focusing on the country's foundations – the Filipino people. His advocacies are poverty alleviation, agriculture development, quality affordable healthcare, eradication of prohibited drugs, adequate and needed infrastructure, and continuous modernization of the assets of the Philippine National Police and the Armed Forces of the Philippines. He is also advocating for the legislation of a continuous roadmap for airport and railway infrastructure modernization. He is the brother of former Department of Interior and Local Government (DILG) Secretary Mel Senen S. Sarmiento, who was also Representative of the 1st District of Samar from 2010 to 2016.

Prior to his entry into politics, Rep. Edgar Sarmiento was president and CEO of Oscar R. Sarmiento Construction, Inc. Rep. Sarmiento has built a solid first-term in Congress. His legislative accomplishments include RA10931 which promotes universal access to quality tertiary education; RA11223 which provides Universal Health Care for all Filipinos; RA 11228 which provides for the mandatory PhilHealth coverage of all persons with disability (PWD); RA11055 which establishes the Filipino Identification System; RA10928 which extends the validity of the Philippine Passport; RA10930 which provides for a 5-year validity of Driver's License; and RA11200 which provides for the rank classification in the Philippine National Police, among others.

He was a member of the Philippine Delegation to the 2017 ASEAN Inter-Parliamentary Assembly or AIPA and Secretary of the 13th Meeting of the AIPA Fact-Finding Committee (AIFOCOM) to Combat the Drug Menace. He was also part of the Philippine Delegation to the 1st Meeting of the AIPA Advisory Council on Dangerous Drugs (AIPACODD) in Singapore. Rep. Sarmiento obtained his Bachelor of Science in Civil Engineering from the Cebu Institute of Technology.

== House of Representatives (2016–2022) ==
While in Congress, he authored and co-authored several house bills and republic acts, namely:

- House Bill No. 0092 – Immediate disqualification of Convicted Officials
- RA10931 - Promotes universal access to quality tertiary education
- RA11223 - Provides Universal Health Care for all Filipinos
- RA11228 - Provides for the mandatory Philhealth coverage of all persons with disability (PWD)
- RA11164 – Increases the monthly pension of senior veterans
- JR00001 - Increase in Base Pay of Military and Uniformed Personnel in the Government
- RA11055 - Establishing the Filipino Identification System
- RA 10928 - Extends the validity of Philippine Passport
- RA10930 – Provides 5-year validity of Driver's License
- RA11200 – Provides for the rank classification in the Philippine National Police
- RA11214 - Establishes a sports complex known as the "National Sports Training Center
- RA11035 - Institutionalizing the Balik Scientist Program
- RA11229 - Provides for the Special Protection of Child Passengers in motor vehicles
- RA11188 - Provides for the Special Protection of Children in situations of armed conflict
- RA11232 - Revised Corporation Code of the Philippines
- RA11285 - Institutionalizing an energy efficiency and conservation program
- RA11215 - Institutionalizing a national integrated cancer control program
- RA 109621 - Gift Check Act of 2017

=== House Committee Membership (2016-2022) ===
House Committee Chair on Transportation

During his time as a member of Congress, Sarmiento was the Vice Chairman of the Commission on Transportation

In November 2018, together with then house committee transportation chairman Rep. Cesar Sarmiento from Catanduanes. They visited Bogota and met with Bogota Mayor Enrique Peñalosa to discuss the TransMilenio BRT system hoping that they would be able to bring the system to the Philippines.

In August 2019, he was appointed as House Commission on Transportation.

=== Other appointments ===
HOUSE MEASURES

- Vice-chairman, Committee on Dangerous Drugs
- Vice-chairman, Committee on Transportation
- Vice-chairman, Committee on Welfare of Children
- Member, Committee on Agriculture and Food
- Member, Committee on Appropriations
- Member, Committee on Health
- Member, Committee on Housing and Urban Development
- Member, Committee on Public Order and Safety
- Member, Committee on Public Works and Highways
- Member, Committee on Visayas Development
- Member, Congressional Oversight Committee on Civil Aviation Authority of the Philippines

House of Representatives of the Philippines
Preceded by Mel Senen Sarmiento	Member of the House of Representatives from Samar's 1st district 2016–2022	Succeeded by Stephen James Tan
