= Edwin Ongchuan =

Filipino politician (born 1968)

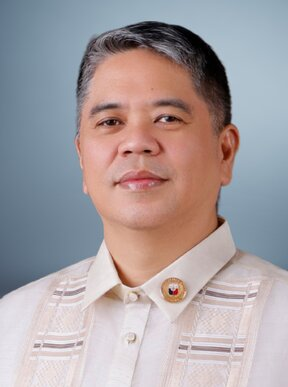
- Official portrait, 2025

Member of the House of Representatives from Northern Samar's 2nd District
- Incumbent
- Assumed office June 30, 2025
- Preceded by: Harris Ongchuan
- In office June 30, 2016 – June 30, 2019
- Preceded by: Emil L. Ong
- Succeeded by: Jose L. Ong, Jr.

9th Governor of Northern Samar
- In office June 30, 2019 – June 30, 2025
- Vice Governor: Gary Lavin (2019–2022); Clarence Dato (2022–2025)
- Preceded by: Jose L. Ong, Jr.
- Succeeded by: Harris Ongchuan

Personal details
- Born: March 3, 1968 (age 58) Quezon City, Philippines
- Party: PFP (2024–present)
- Other political affiliations: NUP (2015–2024)
- Spouse: Blesila Ongchuan
- Relations: Harris Ongchuan (cousin); Jose Ong Jr. (uncle)
- Education: University of the Philippines Diliman (BA)

Edwin Marino Co Ongchuan (born March 3, 1968) is a Filipino politician. He is currently serving as representative for 2nd District of Northern Samar in the House of Representatives of the Philippines, having served since 2025 and from 2016 to 2019. He served as 9th Governor of Northern Samar from 2019 to 2025.

== Electoral history ==
Electoral history of Edwin Ongchuan
Year	Office	Party	Votes received				Result
Year	Office	Party	Total	%	P.	Swing	Result
2016	Representative (Northern Samar–2nd)	NUP	67,653	100.00%	1st	—N/a	Unopposed
2025	Representative (Northern Samar–2nd)	PFP	96,304	85.06%	1st	-14.94	Won
2019	Governor of Northern Samar	NUP	184,526	100.00%	1st	—N/a	Unopposed
2022	Governor of Northern Samar	NUP	226,400	90.26%	1st	-9.74	Won
