= Jose Ong Jr. =

Filipino politician (born 1948)

The Honorable Jose "Jun" L. Ong Jr.

Member of the Philippine House of Representatives from Northern Samar's 2nd District
- In office June 30, 2019 – June 30, 2022
- Preceded by: Edwin C. Ongchuan
- Succeeded by: Harris Christopher M. Ongchuan
- In office June 30, 1987 – June 30, 1992
- Preceded by: District established
- Succeeded by: Wilmar P. Lucero

Governor of Northern Samar
- In office June 30, 2013 – June 30, 2019
- Preceded by: Paul R. Daza
- Succeeded by: Edwin C. Ongchuan

Personal details
- Born: June 19, 1948 (age 78) Northern Samar, Philippines
- Party: NUP (2012–present) LnB (until 1988); LDP (1988–2012)
- Spouse: Desiree "Daisy" Lim née So
- Children: Tanya Pinaliza Ong+, Nadia Bianca Nicolette Ong married to Rhinn Paul Piczon, Lara Krystle Ong+, Jon Ridge Ong, Bryan Larkin Ong
- Education: Far Eastern University
- Occupation: Philippine politician, CPA

Jose "Jun" Lao Ong Jr. (born June 19, 1948) is a Filipino politician from the province of Northern Samar. He was the former Governor the province from 2013 to 2019. He was a member of the House of Representatives of the Philippines from 1987 to 1992 and 2019 to 2022.

Ong is one of the principal authors of House Bill No. 5477, which later became Republic Act No. 11463, commonly referred to as the "Malasakit Centers Act". This law establishes "Malasakit Centers" with the intent to enhance accessibility and efficiency in acquiring medical and financial assistance for healthcare services, ultimately benefiting individuals in need.

During his term as governor from 2013-2019, the Philippine Statistics Authority (PSA) conducted the Poverty Situation Incidence in Eastern Visayas (Full report 2018) and reports that Northern Samar recorded the biggest decline in its poverty incidence among families from 51.5% to 27.4%. Based on the same report, PSA concludes that "Significant improvements in poverty incidence among families between 2015 and 2018 were noted in Northern Samar."

In 2022, the Samar Pacific Coastal Road Project partially opened from four (4) years of construction starting in 2018 when Jun Ong inaugurated it as Northern Samar's governor. The Samar Pacific Coastal Road Project is an 11.6 km 2-lane road project with three (3) bridges.

== Political career ==
=== Gubernatorial career ===
In 2013, Jun Ong was elected governor winning against incumbent Paul Daza. The Dazas have held the position for 12 years. Based on NAMFREL-validated results, Ong led with a total of 113,763 votes against Daza's 79,866.

=== Legislative career ===
Jose L. Ong Jr. was the first Representative of the 2nd District of Samar following the rebirth of the bicameral system and appointment of new members of the Congress in 1987.

In 2019, he again ran for Representative of Northern Samar in the 2nd District. He ran against independent candidate Reyzandro Unay with Ong gaining 74,268 votes against Unay with 17,302.

=== Bills Authored in the 8th Congress ===
1. House Bill No. 1175 (7 September 1987), AN ACT CONSTRUCTING A CONCRETE NATIONAL ROAD CONNECTING THE MUNICIPALITIES OF LAOANG, PALAPAG, MAPANAS, GAMAY AND LIPINIG, ALL IN THE PROVINCE OF NORTHERN SAMAR, AND APPROPRIATING FUNDS THEREFOR (House Bill)
2. Republic Act No. 07094 (2 August 1991), AN ACT ESTABLISHING A VOCATIONAL HIGH SCHOOL IN THE MUNICIPALITY OF SILVINO LOBOS, PROVINCE OF NORTHERN SAMAR, TO BE KNOWN AS THE SILVINO LOBOS VOCATIONAL HIGH SCHOOL, AND APPROPRIATING FUNDS THEREFOR

=== Bills Co-authored in the 8th Congress ===
1. Republic Act No. 06768 (3 November 1989), AN ACT INSTITUTING A BALIKBAYAN PROGRAM
2. Republic Act No. 7581 (27 May 1992), AN ACT PROVIDING PROTECTION TO CONSUMERS BY STABILIZING THE PRICES OF BASIC NECESSITIES AND PRIME COMMODITIES AND BY PRESCRIBING MEASURES AGAINST UNDUE PRICE INCREASES DURING EMERGENCY SITUATIONS AND LIKE OCCASION
3. Republic Act No. 07607 (3 June 1992), AN ACT PROVIDING A MAGNA CARTA OF SMALL FARMER
