= Paul Daza =

Filipino politician (born 1961)

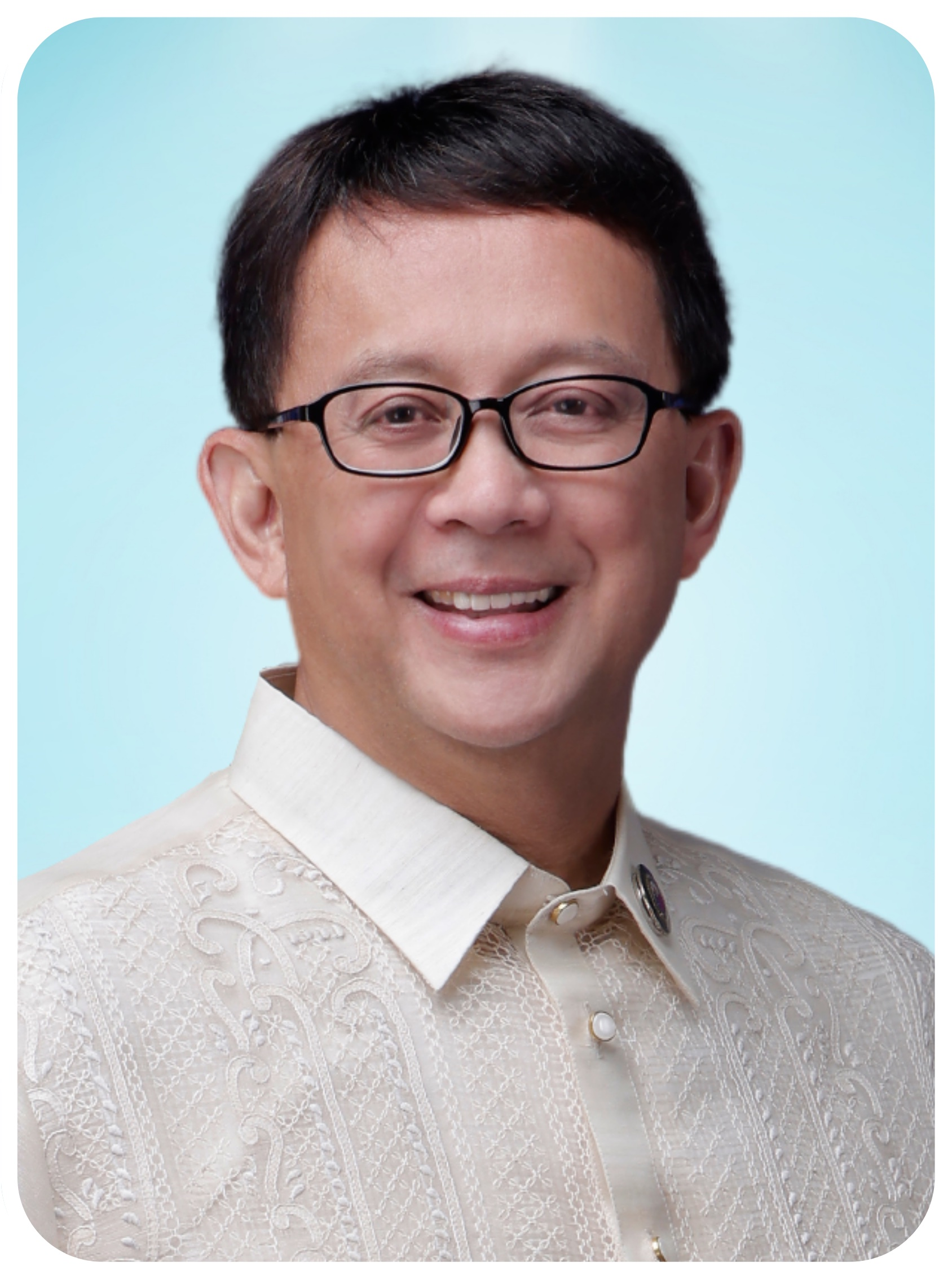
- Official portrait, 2022

Member of the House of Representatives from Northern Samar's 1st congressional district
- In office June 30, 2019 – June 30, 2025
- Preceded by: Raul Daza
- Succeeded by: Niko Raul Daza
- In office June 30, 2007 – June 30, 2010
- Preceded by: Harlin Abayon
- Succeeded by: Raul Daza

Governor of Northern Samar
- In office June 30, 2010 – June 30, 2013
- Preceded by: Raul Daza
- Succeeded by: Jose Ong Jr.

Senior House Deputy Minority Leader
- In office July 26, 2022 – June 30, 2025
- Leader: Marcelino Libanan
- Succeeded by: Edgar Erice

Personal details
- Born: Paul Ruiz Daza
- Party: NUP (2021–present)
- Other political affiliations: Liberal (2007–2021)
- Spouse: Gigi San Jose
- Children: 4
- Parent: Raul Daza (father)
- Education: University of California, Los Angeles (BA, JD)
- Occupation: Politician
- Website: pauldaza.com

Paul Ruiz Daza is a Filipino politician who served as Governor of Northern Samar from 2010 to 2013 and member of the Philippine House of Representatives for Northern Samar's 1st congressional district from 2019 to 2025 and previously from 2007 to 2010.

== Early life ==
Daza was born to former representative Raul Daza and Teresita Ruiz. He finished Bachelor of Arts in Economics and Juris Doctor at the University of California, Los Angeles.

== Political career and personal life ==
He originally ran under the Liberal Party in the 2019 elections, winning against the Nacionalista Party, after the win, the opposition Harlin Abayon filed an electoral protest against the win, which was unsuccessful. On December 29, 2020, Former president Rodrigo Duterte accused Daza of corruption although without evidence. Daza rejected the allegations. Daza married to Gigi San Jose with whom he has four sons.

Political offices
| Preceded by Raul Daza | Governor of Northern Samar; 2010–2013 | Succeeded by Jose Ong Jr. |
House of Representatives of the Philippines
| Preceded by Raul Daza | Member of the House of Representatives from Northern Samar's 1st district 2019–2025; 2007–2010 | Succeeded by Niko Raul Daza |
| Preceded by Harlin Abayon | Member of the House of Representatives from Northern Samar's 1st district 2019–2025; 2007–2010 | Succeeded by Raul Daza |
