= Escudero =

Escudero is a Spanish surname meaning squire (lit. shield-bearer). Notable people with the surname include:

- Abraham Escudero Montoya (1940–2009), Roman Catholic bishop of the Roman Catholic Diocese of Palmira, Colombia
- Adrián Escudero (1927–2011), Spanish footballer
- Al Escudero (born 1966), video game designer for computer games
- Carlos Escudero (born 1989), Chilean footballer
- Daniel Escudero (1941–2021), Chilean footballer
- Damián Escudero (born 1987), Argentine professional footballer
- Dette Escudero (born 1978), Filipino politician
- Don Escudero, Filipino movie writer, actor and director
- Efraín Escudero (born 1986), Mexican-American mixed martial artist
- Esteban Escudero (1946–2025), Spanish Roman Catholic bishop and theologian
- Eugenia Escudero (1914–2011), Mexican fencer
- Evelina Escudero (born 1942), Filipino politician
- Fernándo Norzagaray y Escudero, Captains General of the Philippines
- Francis Escudero (born 1969), Filipino politician
- Francisco Escudero Casquino, Peruvian politician
- Francisco Escudero (composer), (1912–2002), Basque composer
- Gonzalo Escudero (1903–1971), Ecuadorian poet and diplomat
- Gonzalo Escudero (footballer) (born 2007), Argentine professional footballer
- Hernán Escudero Martínez (born 1946), Ecuadorian diplomat and professor
- Jorge Stanbury Escudero, Peruvian-born Venezuelan singer and composer
- Juan Escudero (1920–2012), Spanish professional footballer
- Macarena Escudero (born 1990), activist in the Socialist Workers' Party, Argentina
- Manuel Escudero (1946–2026), Spanish economist and politician
- Marcelo Escudero (born 1972), Argentine footballer
- María del Carmen Escudero (born 1969), Mexican politician
- María Escudero-Escribano (born 1983), Spanish chemist
- Mario Escudero (1928–2004), Spanish flamenco guitar virtuoso
- Martin Escudero (born 1990), Filipino actor, model, television personality
- Matías Escudero (born 1988) Argentine footballer
- Osvaldo Escudero (born 1960), Argentine footballer
- Pablo Escudero Morales (born 1973), politician and Mexican lawyer
- Paquito Escudero (born 1966), Spanish retired football midfielder and manager
- Pío García-Escudero (born 1952), Spanish architect and politician
- Rafi Escudero (born 1945), Puerto Rican musician, singer, composer, poet and political activist
- Ralph Escudero (1898–1970), bassist and tubist active on the early American jazz scene
- Raúl García Escudero (born 1986), Spanish footballer
- Salvador Escudero (1942–2012), Filipino politician
- Sergio Escudero (footballer, born 1964), Argentine-Japanese football player
- Sergio Escudero (footballer, born 1983), Argentine football player
- Sergio Escudero (footballer, born 1988), Japanese football player
- Sergio Escudero (footballer, born 1989), Spanish professional footballer
- Sonia Escudero (born 1953), Argentine Justicialist Party politician
- Stanley Tuemler Escudero (born 1942), American diplomat who served in the U.S. foreign service in multiple capacities
- Vicente Escudero (1892–1980), Spanish flamenco dancer

== See also ==
- Fidel Olivas Escudero District, district of the province Mariscal Luzuriaga in Peru
- Ignacio Escudero District, districts of the province of Sullana in Peru
- Juan R. Escudero (municipality), municipalities of Guerrero, in south-western Mexico
- Professor Julio Escudero Base, permanent Chilean Antarctic research base
- Villa Escudero, 800 hectares of working coconut plantation and hacienda in the Philippines
