= Francisco Escudero =

Francisco Escudero may refer to:

- Francisco Escudero Casquino, Peruvian politician
- Francisco Escudero García de Goizueta (1912–2002), Spanish composer
- Paquito Escudero (Francisco Escudero Martínez, born 1966), former Spanish footballer
- Francisco Escudero (Mexican politician), Mexican Secretary of Foreign Affairs 1913
- Francis Escudero, a Filipino senator.
