= Stanbury (surname) =

Stanbury is a surname. Notable people with the surname include:

- Caroline Stanbury (born 1976), British businesswoman and reality television personality
- Con Stanbury (c.1894–1975), Canadian professional snooker player
- Ellis Stanbury (1931–2007), Welsh international lawn and indoor bowler
- Henry Stanbury (1803–1881), lawyer and United States Attorney General
- Jim Stanbury (1868–1945), sculler
- John Stanbury (died 1474), English Roman Catholic bishop
- John Headon Stanbury (1835–1907), English hotelier and property developer
- Jonathan Stanbury (born 1951), British fencer
- Jorge Lozada Stanbury (1931–2018), Peruvian politician
- Jorge Stanbury Escudero, singer-songwriter
- Nathan Stanbury (1670? – 1720), Mayor of Philadelphia
- Patrick Stanbury, British film producer and historian
- Richard Stanbury (politician) (1923–2014), Canadian senator
- Richard Stanbury (1916–2008), cricketer and diplomat
- Robert Stanbury (1929–2017), Canadian public servant
- William Stanbury (1788–1873), American attorney and politician

== See also ==
- Stanbury, the English village
- Stansbury (surname)
