= 2025 President of the Senate of the Philippines election =

2025 President of the Senate of the Philippines election may refer to the following:

- July 2025 President of the Senate of the Philippines election, held in July 2025
- September 2025 President of the Senate of the Philippines election, held in September 2025
