= José María Hernández =

Spanish politician (1959–2015)

President of the Provincial Deputation of Palencia
- In office June 2011 – 15 February 2015

Personal details
- Born: 18 December 1959 Ciudad Rodrigo, Spain
- Died: 15 February 2015 (aged 55) Valladolid, Spain
- Party: People's Party
- Education: University of Oviedo, University of Salamanca

José María Hernández (18 December 1959 – 15 February 2015) was a Spanish politician of the People's Party. He served as President of the Provincial Deputation of Palencia from June 2011 until his death.

== Career ==
Hernández was born 18 December 1959 in Ciudad Rodrigo. He studied biological sciences at the University of Oviedo and later basic education (EGB) at the University of Salamanca.

In 2003 Hernández was named territorial delegate of Castilla y León in Palencia. He became President of the Provincial Deputation of Palencia in June 2011 and served until his death for the People's Party. Hernández had also been member of the municipal council of the city of Palencia.

Hernández died on 15 February 2015 in the Clinical Hospital of Valladolid from a bacterial infection. His remembrance service was held at the Palencia Cathedral, under auspicies of Archbishop Esteban Escudero. Hernández was married.
