= Richard Stanbury =

Richard Stanbury may refer to:

- Richard Stanbury (politician), Canadian lawyer and politician
- Richard Stanbury (diplomat), British diplomat and cricketer
