= 20th Congress of the Philippines =

41st legislative term of the Philippines

←	19th	21st	→
- GSIS Building (2010) (top) and Batasang Pambansa Complex (2010) (bottom)

Overview
- Term: July 28, 2025 – present
- President: Bongbong Marcos
- Vice President: Sara Duterte

Senate
- Members: 24
- President: Francis Escudero (until September 8, 2025); Tito Sotto (September 8, 2025 – May 11, 2026); Alan Peter Cayetano (May 11 – June 3, 2026); Sherwin Gatchalian (from June 17, 2026; acting: June 3–17, 2026)
- President pro tempore: Jinggoy Estrada (until September 8, 2025); Panfilo Lacson (September 8, 2025 – May 11, 2026); Loren Legarda (May 11 – June 3, 2026); Sherwin Gatchalian (June 3–17, 2026); Tito Sotto (from June 17, 2026)
- Majority leader: Joel Villanueva (until September 8, 2025; acting: May 11 – June 3, 2026); Juan Miguel Zubiri (September 8, 2025 – May 11, 2026, and from June 3, 2026)
- Minority leader: Tito Sotto (until September 8, 2025, and May 11 – June 3, 2026); Alan Peter Cayetano (September 8, 2025 – May 11, 2026, and from June 17, 2026)

House of Representatives
- Members: 318
- Speaker: Martin Romualdez (until September 17, 2025); Bojie Dy (from September 17, 2025)
- Senior Deputy Speaker: David Suarez (until November 19, 2025); Dinand Hernandez (from November 19, 2025)
- Deputy Speakers: Janette Garin; Yasser Balindong; Paolo Ortega; Jay Khonghun; Kristine Singson-Meehan (until August 3, 2026); Ronaldo Puno; Bojie Dy (until September 17, 2025); Ferjenel Biron; Raymond Mendoza; Yevgeny Emano (from August 11, 2025); Dinand Hernandez (until November 19, 2025); David Suarez (from November 19, 2025); Maria Rachel Arenas (from March 18, 2026); Duke Frasco (from March 18, 2026); Albee Benitez (from March 18, 2026); Mercedes Alvarez–Lansang (from August 3, 2026)
- Majority Leader: Sandro Marcos
- Minority Leader: Marcelino Libanan

The 20th Congress of the Philippines (Filipino: Ikadalawampung Kongreso ng Pilipinas), composed of the Philippine Senate and House of Representatives, is the current meeting of Congress convened on July 28, 2025. The 20th Congress is the meeting during the last three years of Bongbong Marcos's presidency, and will end on June 7, 2028. The convening of the 20th Congress followed the 2025 general elections, which replaced half of the Senate membership and the entire membership of the House of Representatives.

The House of Representatives continues to meet in the Batasang Pambansa Complex. The Senate will remain meeting in the GSIS Building before transferring to the New Senate Building in Taguig by 2028.

== History ==
In the 2025 Philippine midterm election, the administration-backed Alyansa para sa Bagong Pilipinas won the most seats in the Senate but lost ground to groups opposed to President Bongbong Marcos. The DuterTen ticket endorsed by Vice President Sara Duterte and former President Rodrigo Duterte outperformed pre-election surveys and gained seats in the upper chamber. Meanwhile, the KiBam tandem, having run as an independent opposition aligned with former Vice President Leni Robredo, were both elected, each winning a large share of the vote in upset victories. While Lakas–CMD remained the largest party in the House of Representatives—with 104 of its congressional candidates winning in local races—their share of seats declined from outgoing 19th Congress.

Political analyst Ronald Llamas interpreted the results as a rejection of the direction of the Marcos administration but not necessarily an approval of the vocal Duterte opposition. Media outlets attributed the results to Marcos's lack of charisma, his economic policies, the arrest of Rodrigo Duterte, and the first impeachment of Vice President Sara Duterte.

Among the Senators in the 20th Congress, there are four pairs of siblings—Alan Peter and Pia Cayetano; Raffy and Erwin Tulfo; Jinggoy Estrada and JV Ejercito; and Mark and Camille Villar—the most in Philippine history. Tito Sotto will become the first Senator to serve a fifth term, becoming the longest-serving member in the history of the chamber.

In the House of Representatives, seven-term Representative Raymond Mendoza, who has served in every Congress since 2009, is expected to be term-limited after this Congress after having served three uninterrupted terms.

On November 8, 2025, Ombudsman Jesus Crispin Remulla claimed in an interview to have seen an arrest warrant for Senator Ronald "Bato" dela Rosa issued by the International Criminal Court (ICC), after which dela Rosa hid from public view and refrained from attending any further Senate session for the next six months.

=== 2026 Senate upheaval ("Senateflix") ===
On May 11, 2026, dela Rosa came out of hiding and returned to the Senate, an unexpected move that caused surprise to Senate attendees. Dela Rosa return was due to the encouragement of Senator Alan Peter Cayetano, who provided him with a vehicle to head to the Senate. Despite attempts by two female agents of the National Bureau of Investigation (NBI) to serve an International Criminal Court warrant against him at the basement entrance, dela Rosa evaded arrest and attended the day's session to participate in the ouster of Senator Tito Sotto as Senate President to be replaced with Cayetano, a move interpreted to be in reaction to the ongoing second impeachment of Vice President Duterte. The institution was soon placed on lockdown as dela Rosa sought protective custody within the Senate.

On the evening of May 13, 2026, unprecedented gunfire was initiated by the Senate Sergeant-at-Arms at the GSIS Building housing the institution during attempts by Senator dela Rosa to evade arresting authorities. The event, occurring within the initial days of the "Senateflix" controversy, has been described as "embarrassing" and a "national disgrace" for allegedly protecting a fugitive from international law and eroding the institution's "dignity, credibility and moral authority".

=== Special session of Congress ===
On June 15, 2026, President Bongbong Marcos called for a special session of Congress to take place on June 17, 2026. The Special Session of Congress witnessed the election of Sherwin Gatchalian as President of the Senate of the Philippines, ending a two-week leadership dispute with then-Senate President Alan Peter Cayetano. Gatchalian served as Senate president pro tempore and acting Senate president from June 3 to 17, 2026, after the then-majority bloc skipped the regular sessions on June 1 and 2, following the arrest of Senator Jinggoy Estrada on June 1, 2026.

== Timeline ==
=== 2025 ===
- June 10 – The Senate of the 19th Congress convenes as an impeachment court for the trial of Vice President Duterte.
- June 30 – New term begins for the Philippine Senate and the House of Representatives.
- July 28
  - Congress convenes. Members elected in 2025 formally takes office.
  - Senator Francis Escudero (NPC) is elected Senate president.
  - Representative Martin Romualdez (Lakas; Leyte–1st) is elected House speaker.
  - President Bongbong Marcos delivers his fourth State of the Nation Address.
- August 6 – The Senate of the 20th Congress voted to archive the articles of impeachment of Vice President Duterte.
- September 8
  - Senator Tito Sotto is elected Senate president after Senator Francis Escudero was ousted by 15 senators.
  - The Senate Blue Ribbon Committee resumed its probe on anomalous flood control projects of the Department of Public Works and Highways. Controversial government contractors Curlee and Sarah Discaya link several congressmen to kickbacks received from project funds.
- September 9 – In a hearing convened by the House Committee on Public Accounts, former DPWH district engineer Brice Hernandez links Senators Jinggoy Estrada and Joel Villanueva to the anomalous flood control scandal.
- September 17 – Representative Martin Romualdez resigns as House Speaker. Bojie Dy is elected as the new House Speaker.
- September 23 – The Senate Blue Ribbon Committee resumed its probe on the flood control scandal, with former DPWH district engineer Henry Alcantara linked Senators Estrada, Villanueva, former Senator Bong Revilla, Representative Zaldy Co (Ako Bicol), former DPWH Undersecretary Roberto Bernardo, former Representative Mitch Cajayon-Uy (Caloocan-2nd) to payoffs linked to the anomalous flood control scandal with the National Bureau of Investigation (NBI) recommending the filing charges of these personalities for indirect bribery and malversation of public funds.
- September 25 – The Senate Blue Ribbon Committee resumed its probe on the flood control scandal, with former DPWH Undersecretary Roberto Bernardo admitting receiving payoffs and also linking former Senate President Francis Escudero, former Senator Nancy Binay, Representative Co, Commission on Audit Commissioner Mario G. Lipana to scandal.

=== 2026 ===
- May 11:
  - Vice President Sara Duterte is impeached by the House of Representatives for the second time.
  - Senator Alan Peter Cayetano was installed as Senate president after Tito Sotto was ousted.
- May 11–13 – The Senate temporarily went into lockdown following a standoff and exchange of gunfire at the Senate building within the Government Service Insurance System (GSIS) compound during efforts to serve an International Criminal Court arrest warrant against Senator Ronald dela Rosa.
- May 18 – The Senate of the 20th Congress convenes as an impeachment court for the trial of Vice President Duterte.
- June 1 - Senator Jinggoy Estrada was arrested in the Senate following a warrant issued by Sandiganbayan's Fifth Division. He is later placed in a 90-day preventive suspension on 16 June 2026.
- June 2 - Cavite 4th District Representative Kiko Barzaga was expelled from the House of Representatives of the Philippines by a vote of 265-14-8.
- June 3 – Senator Sherwin Gatchalian is elected as Senate President pro tempore and later designated Acting Senate President after ousting Senator Alan Peter Cayetano.
- June 15 - President Bongbong Marcos calls for a Special Session of Congress on 17 June 2026.
- June 17 - Senator Sherwin Gatchalian is elected as President of the Senate of the Philippines by a vote of 13 senators. Senator Tito Sotto was elected as Senate President Pro Tempore, succeeding Gatchalian.
- July 6 - Senator Rodante Marcoleta was arrested in the Senate following a warrant of arrest for plunder issued by the Sandiganbayan's Third Division.

==== Date unknown ====
- The New Senate Building will be completed in late 2026 or early 2027, per Senate President Francis Escudero when asked following a sine die adjournment in 2025.

== Party summary ==
=== Senate party summary ===
	Party											Total	Vacant
	Akbayan	KANP	Lakas	LP	NP	NPC	PDP–Laban	PFP	PMP	UNA	Ind	Total	Vacant
End of previous Congress	1	0	1	0	5	5	3	1	1	1	5	23	1
Begin (July 28, 2025)	1	1	1	1	4	6	3	0	1	0	6	24	0
Present (November 6, 2026)	1	1	1	1	4	6	3	0	1	0	6	24	0
Current voting share	4.2%	4.2%	4.2%	4.2%	16.7%	25.0%	12.5%	0.0%	4.2%	0.0%	25.0%		

=== House party summary ===
	Party																								Total	Vacant
	Aksyon	Asenso	AZAP	BUP	CDP	HTL	Lakas	LDP	LP	MKTZNU	NP	Navoteño	1CEBU	NPC	NUP	PDP	PFP	PMP	PRP	Reporma	SST	UNA	Ind	Party-list	Total	Vacant
End of previous Congress	0	0	0	1	1	2	113	1	5	0	27	1	0	38	39	0	12	0	0	1	1	1	2	61	306	8
Begin (July 28, 2025)	2	2	1	0	1	3	101	2	6	2	23	1	0	33	33	1	28	2	1	0	0	1	11	63	317	0
Present (November 6, 2026)	0	0	0	0	1	3	75	1	6	2	18	1	1	35	56	1	52	0	0	0	0	0	2	64	318	1
Current voting share	0.0%	0.0%	0.0%	0.0%	0.3%	0.9%	23.9%	0.3%	1.9%	0.6%	5.7%	0.3%	0.3%	10.7%	17.6%	0.3%	16.4%	0.0%	0.0%	0.0%	0.0%	0.0%	0.3%	20.1%		

== Leadership ==
=== Senate ===
Senate President

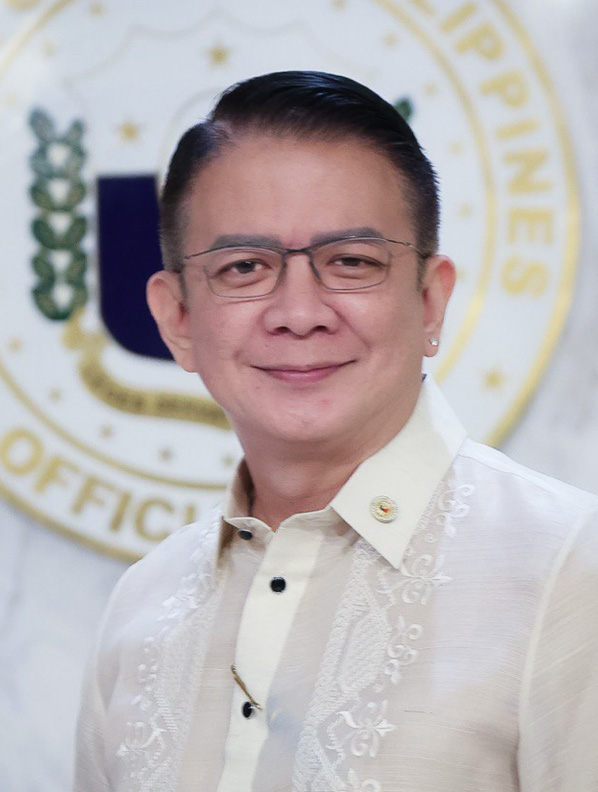
Francis Escudero,
until September 8, 2025

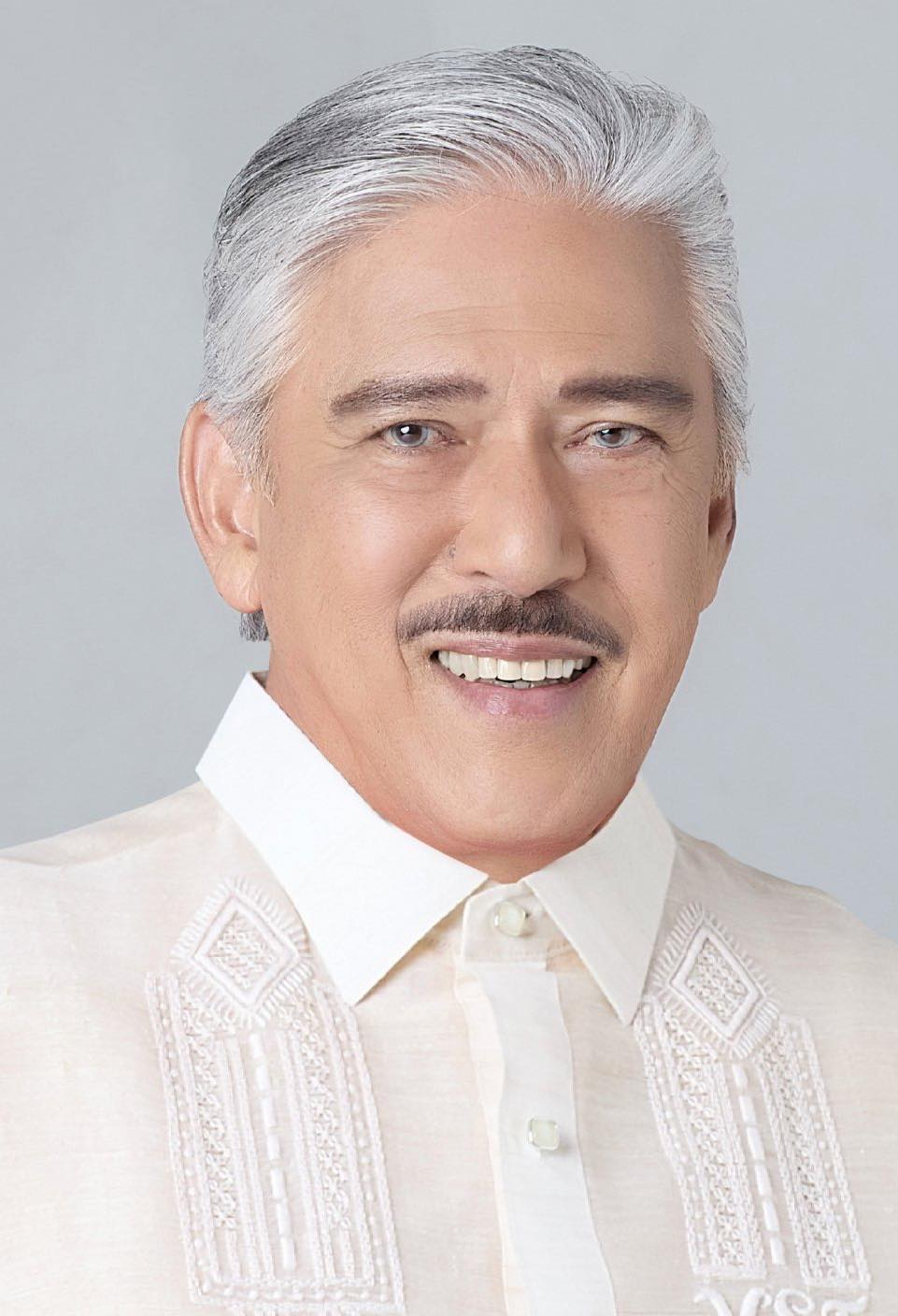
Tito Sotto,
September 8, 2025 – May 11, 2026

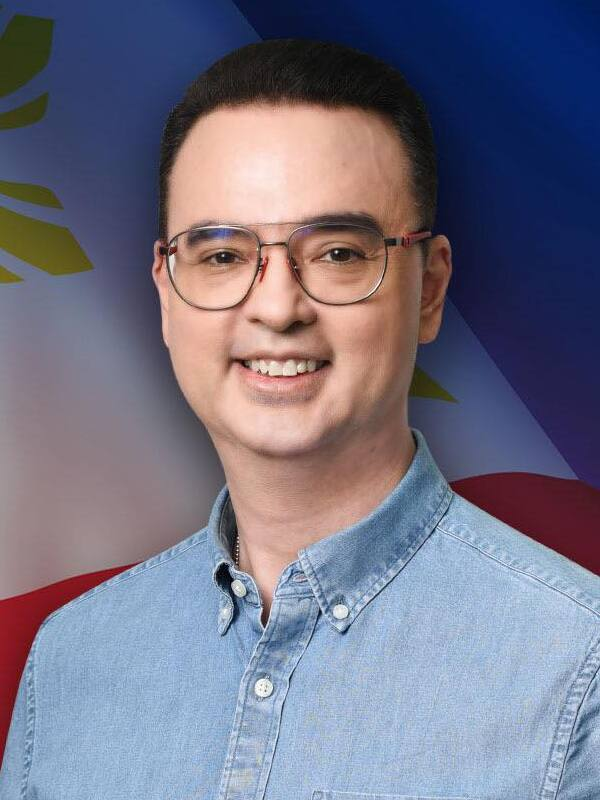
Alan Peter Cayetano,
May 11 – June 3, 2026

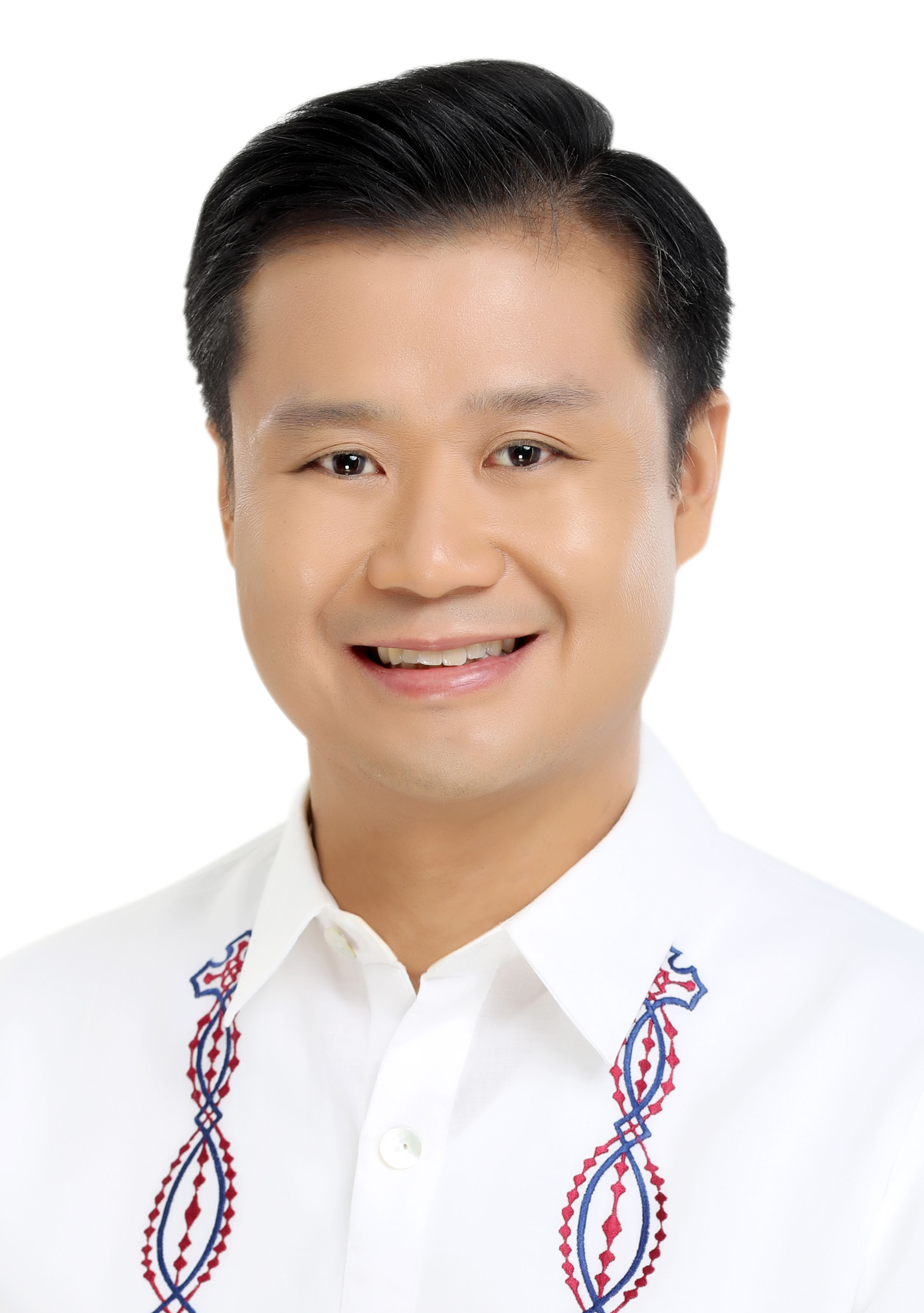
Sherwin Gatchalian,
from June 17, 2026
(acting: June 3–17, 2026)

- Senate President:
  - Francis Escudero (NPC), until September 8, 2025
  - Tito Sotto (NPC), September 8, 2025 – May 11, 2026
  - Alan Peter Cayetano (Independent), May 11 – June 3, 2026
  - Sherwin Gatchalian (NPC), from June 17, 2026; acting: June 3–17, 2026
- Senate President pro tempore:
  - Jinggoy Estrada (PMP), until September 8, 2025
  - Panfilo Lacson (Independent), September 8, 2025 – May 11, 2026
  - Loren Legarda (NPC), May 11 – June 3, 2026
  - Sherwin Gatchalian (NPC), June 3–17, 2026
  - Tito Sotto (NPC), from June 17, 2026
- Majority Floor Leader:
  - Joel Villanueva (Independent), until September 8, 2025; acting: May 11 – June 3, 2026
  - Juan Miguel Zubiri (Independent), September 8, 2025 – May 11, 2026, and from June 3, 2026
- Senior Deputy Majority Floor Leader: JV Ejercito (NPC), since June 17, 2026
- Deputy Majority Floor Leaders:
  - JV Ejercito (NPC), until May 11, 2026
  - Rodante Marcoleta (Independent), until September 8, 2025
  - Risa Hontiveros (Akbayan), September 9, 2025 – May 11, 2026
  - Joel Villanueva (Independent), since June 17, 2026
- Minority Floor Leader:
  - Tito Sotto (NPC), until September 8, 2025
  - Alan Peter Cayetano (Independent), September 9, 2025 – May 11, 2026, and from June 17, 2026
  - Tito Sotto (NPC), May 11 – June 3, 2026
- Deputy Minority Floor Leaders:
  - Juan Miguel Zubiri (Independent), until September 8, 2025
  - Risa Hontiveros (Akbayan), until September 8, 2025
  - Rodante Marcoleta (Independent), September 9, 2025 – May 11, 2026
  - Joel Villanueva (Independent), September 9, 2025 – May 11, 2026
  - Imee Marcos (Nacionalista), since July 29, 2026

=== House of Representatives ===
House Speaker

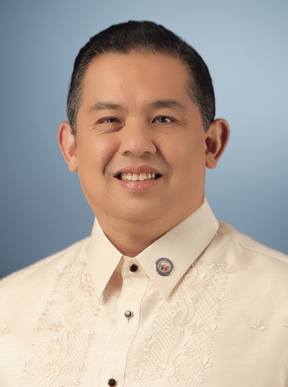
Martin Romualdez,
until September 17, 2025

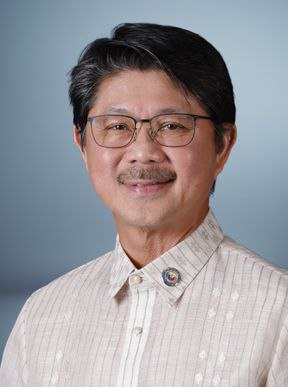
Bojie Dy,
from September 17, 2025

- Speaker:
  - Martin Romualdez (Leyte–1st, Lakas), until September 17, 2025
  - Bojie Dy (Isabela–6th, PFP), from September 17, 2025
- Senior Deputy Speaker:
  - David Suarez (Quezon–2nd, Lakas), until November 19, 2025
  - Dinand Hernandez (South Cotabato–2nd, PFP), from November 19, 2025
- Deputy Speakers:
  - Janette Garin (Iloilo–1st, Lakas)
  - Yasser Balindong (Lanao del Sur–2nd, Lakas)
  - Paolo Ortega (La Union–1st, Lakas)
  - Jay Khonghun (Zambales–1st, Lakas)
  - Kristine Singson-Meehan (Ilocos Sur–2nd, NPC), until August 3, 2026
  - Ronaldo Puno (Antipolo–1st, NUP)
  - Bojie Dy (Isabela–6th, PFP), until September 17, 2025
  - Ferjenel Biron (Iloilo–4th, Nacionalista)
  - Raymond Mendoza (Party-list, TUCP)
  - Yevgeny Emano (Misamis Oriental–2nd, Nacionalista), from August 11, 2025
  - Dinand Hernandez (South Cotabato–2nd, PFP), until November 19, 2025
  - David Suarez (Quezon–2nd, Lakas), from November 19, 2025
  - Maria Rachel Arenas (Pangasinan–3rd, Lakas), from March 18, 2026
  - Duke Frasco (Cebu–5th, Independent), from March 18, 2026
  - Albee Benitez (Bacolod–Lone, PFP), from March 18, 2026
  - Mercedes Alvarez–Lansang (Negros Occidental–6th, NPC), from August 3, 2026
- Majority Floor Leader: Sandro Marcos (Ilocos Norte–1st, Lakas)
- Senior Deputy Majority Floor Leader: Lorenz Defensor (Iloilo–3rd, NUP)
- Minority Floor Leader: Marcelino Libanan (Party-list, 4Ps)
- Senior Deputy Minority Floor Leader
  - Edgar Erice (Caloocan–2nd, Liberal), until March 3, 2026
  - Leila de Lima (Party-list, ML), from March 3, 2026

== Sessions ==
- First Regular Session: July 28, 2025 – June 5, 2026
  - July 28, 2025 – October 10, 2025 (Senate); October 13, 2025 (House)
  - November 11, 2025 (Note: Session suspended due to Super Typhoon Uwan. It was the original session calendar resume on November 10, 2025.) – December 29, 2025
  - January 26, 2026 – March 20, 2026
  - May 4, 2026 – June 5, 2026
  - First Special Session: June 17, 2026
- Second Regular Session: July 27, 2026 – June 4, 2027
  - July 27, 2026 – October 9, 2026 (Senate); October 12, 2026 (House)
  - November 9, 2026 – December 18, 2026
  - January 18, 2027 – March 19, 2027
  - May 3, 2027 – June 4, 2027

== Members ==
=== Senate ===
The following are the terms of the senators of this Congress, according to the date of election:

- For senators elected on May 9, 2022: June 30, 2022 – June 30, 2028
- For senators elected on May 12, 2025: June 30, 2025 – June 30, 2031

Senator	Party	Term	Term end	Bloc	Registered in
Bam Aquino	KANP	1	2031	Majority	Concepcion, Tarlac
Alan Peter Cayetano	Independent	1	2028	Minority	Taguig
Pia Cayetano	Nacionalista	2	2031	Minority	Taguig
Ronald dela Rosa	PDP–Laban	2	2031	Minority	Santa Cruz, Davao del Sur
JV Ejercito	NPC	1	2028	Majority	San Juan
Francis Escudero	NPC	1	2028	Majority	Sorsogon City, Sorsogon
Jinggoy Estrada (Note: Jinggoy Estrada was detained on June 1, 2026, on plunder charges related to the flood control projects scandal.)	PMP	1	2028	Minority	San Juan
Win Gatchalian	NPC	2	2028	Majority	Valenzuela
Bong Go	PDP–Laban	2	2031	Minority	Davao City
Risa Hontiveros	Akbayan	2	2028	Majority	Quezon City
Panfilo Lacson	Independent	1	2031	Majority	Imus, Cavite
Lito Lapid	NPC	2	2031	Majority	Porac, Pampanga
Loren Legarda	NPC	1	2028	Minority	Pandan, Antique
Rodante Marcoleta (Note: Rodante Marcoleta was detained on July 6, 2026, on plunder charges related to undeclared donations prior to his 2025 election campaign.)	Independent	1	2031	Minority	Cainta, Rizal
Imee Marcos	Nacionalista	2	2031	Minority	Laoag, Ilocos Norte
Robin Padilla	PDP–Laban	1	2028	Minority	Jose Panganiban, Camarines Norte
Kiko Pangilinan	Liberal	1	2031	Majority	Silang, Cavite
Tito Sotto	NPC	1	2031	Majority	Quezon City
Erwin Tulfo	Lakas	1	2031	Majority	Quezon City
Raffy Tulfo	Independent	1	2028	Majority	Quezon City
Joel Villanueva	Independent	2	2028	Majority	Bocaue, Bulacan
Camille Villar	Nacionalista	1	2031	Minority	Las Piñas
Mark Villar	Nacionalista	1	2028	Majority	Las Piñas
Juan Miguel Zubiri	Independent	2	2028	Majority	Maramag, Bukidnon

=== House of Representatives ===
Terms of members of the House of Representatives began on June 30, 2025, and will end on June 30, 2028, unless stated otherwise.

Province/City	District	Representative	Party	Term	Bloc
Abra	Lone	Joseph Bernos	NUP (Note: Affiliated with Lakas–CMD at election.)	1	Majority
Agusan del Norte	Lone	Dale Corvera	PFP	2	Majority
Agusan del Sur	1st	Alfel Bascug	NUP	3	Majority
Agusan del Sur	2nd	Eddiebong Plaza	NUP	3	Majority
Aklan	1st	Jess Marquez	NPC	1	Majority
Aklan	2nd	Florencio Miraflores	NPC	1	Majority
Albay	1st	Krisel Lagman	Liberal	1	Minority
Albay	2nd	Caloy Loria	NUP (Note: Affiliated with Partido Demokratiko Pilipino at election.)	1	Majority
Albay	3rd	Adrian Salceda	Lakas	1	Majority
Antipolo	1st	Ronaldo Puno	NUP	1	Majority
Antipolo	2nd	Romeo Acop (Note: Romeo Acop died on December 20, 2025.)	NUP	2	Majority
Antipolo	2nd	Bong Acop (Note: Bong Acop was elected on March 14, 2026, to succeed Romeo Acop. He took office on March 16, 2026.)	NUP	0	Majority
Antique	Lone	Antonio Legarda Jr.	NPC	2	Majority
Apayao	Lone	Eleanor Begtang	NPC	2	Majority
Aurora	Lone	Rommel T. Angara	LDP	3	Majority
Bacolod	Lone	Albee Benitez	PFP (Note: Independent at election.)	1	Majority
Baguio	Lone	Mauricio Domogan	Lakas	1	Majority
Basilan	Lone	Yusop Alano	PFP	1	Majority
Bataan	1st	Antonino Roman III	Lakas	1	Majority
Bataan	2nd	Albert Garcia	NUP	2	Majority
Bataan	3rd	Maria Angela Garcia	NUP	2	Majority
Batanes	Lone	Jun Gato (Note: Jun Gato died on September 21, 2026.)	NPC	3	Majority
Batangas	1st	Leandro Leviste	Lakas	1	Majority
Batangas	2nd	Gerville Luistro	Lakas	2	Majority
Batangas	3rd	King Collantes	NPC	1	Majority
Batangas	4th	Caloy Bolilia	Nacionalista	1	Majority
Batangas	5th	Beverley Dimacuha	Nacionalista	1	Majority
Batangas	6th	Ryan Recto	Nacionalista	1	Majority
Benguet	Lone	Eric Yap (Note: Eric Yap took office on July 3, 2025, after having his proclamation as representative-elect initially suspended.)	Lakas	0	Majority
Biliran	Lone	Gerardo Espina Jr.	Lakas	3	Majority
Biñan	Lone	Arman Dimaguila	PFP	1	Majority
Bohol	1st	John Geesnell Yap	NUP (Note: Affiliated with Laban ng Demokratikong Pilipino at election.)	1	Majority
Bohol	2nd	Vanvan Aumentado	NUP	2	Majority
Bohol	3rd	Alexie Tutor	NUP	3	Majority
Bukidnon	1st	Jose Manuel Alba	NUP	2	Majority
Bukidnon	2nd	Jonathan Keith Flores	Lakas	3	Majority
Bukidnon	3rd	Audrey Zubiri	PFP	1	Majority
Bukidnon	4th	Laarni Roque	Nacionalista	2	Majority
Bulacan	1st	Danny Domingo	NUP	2	Majority
Bulacan	2nd	Tina Pancho	NUP	2	Majority
Bulacan	3rd	Cholo Violago	PFP	1	Majority
Bulacan	4th	Linabelle Villarica	PFP	2	Majority
Bulacan	5th	Agay Cruz	PFP	1	Majority
Bulacan	6th	Salvador Pleyto	PFP	2	Majority
Butuan	Lone	Jose Aquino II	Lakas	2	Majority
Cagayan	1st	Ramon Nolasco	PFP	1	Majority
Cagayan	2nd	Baby Alfonso	PFP	2	Majority
Cagayan	3rd	Joseph Lara	Lakas	3	Majority
Cagayan de Oro	1st	Lordan Suan	PFP	2	Majority
Cagayan de Oro	2nd	Rufus Rodriguez	CDP	3	Majority
Calamba	Lone	Cha Hernandez	Lakas	2	Majority
Caloocan	1st	Oscar Malapitan	Nacionalista	2	Majority
Caloocan	2nd	Edgar Erice	Liberal	1	Minority
Caloocan	3rd	Dean Asistio	NUP	2	Majority
Camarines Norte	1st	Josefina Tallado	NPC	3	Majority
Camarines Norte	2nd	Rosemarie Panotes	Lakas	2	Majority
Camarines Sur	1st	Hori Horibata	NUP	2	Majority
Camarines Sur	2nd	Luigi Villafuerte	NUP	1	Majority
Camarines Sur	3rd	Nelson Legacion	NPC	1	Majority
Camarines Sur	4th	Arnulf Bryan Fuentebella	NPC	3	Majority
Camarines Sur	5th	Miguel Luis Villafuerte	NUP	2	Majority
Camiguin	Lone	Jurdin Jesus Romualdo	Lakas	2	Majority
Capiz	1st	Howard Guintu	Independent	2	Majority
Capiz	2nd	Jane Castro	Lakas	2	Majority
Catanduanes	Lone	Eulogio Rodriguez	PFP	2	Majority
Cavite	1st	Jolo Revilla	NUP	2	Majority
Cavite	2nd	Lani Mercado	Lakas	2	Majority
Cavite	3rd	Adrian Jay Advincula	NUP	2	Majority
Cavite	4th	Kiko Barzaga (Note: Kiko Barzaga was expelled on June 2, 2026.)	PDP–Laban (Note: Affiliated with the National Unity Party at election.)	1	Minority
Cavite	4th	Jenny Barzaga (Note: Jenny Barzaga was elected on August 29, 2026, to succeed Kiko Barzaga. She took office on September 1, 2026.)	NUP	0	TBA
Cavite	5th	Roy Loyola	NPC	2	Majority
Cavite	6th	Antonio Ferrer	NUP	2	Majority
Cavite	7th	Crispin Diego Remulla	NUP	1	Majority
Cavite	8th	Aniela Tolentino	NUP	2	Majority
Cebu	1st	Rhea Gullas	NUP	2	Majority
Cebu	2nd	Edsel Galeos	Lakas	2	Majority
Cebu	3rd	Karen Flores-Garcia	NUP	1	Majority
Cebu	4th	Sun Shimura	NUP (Note: Affiliated with Pwersa ng Masang Pilipino at election.)	1	Majority
Cebu	5th	Duke Frasco	1CEBU	3	Majority
Cebu	6th	Daphne Lagon	NUP	2	Majority
Cebu	7th	Patricia Calderon	NPC	1	Majority
Cebu City	1st	Rachel del Mar	NUP (Note: Affiliated with the Nationalist People's Coalition at election.)	2	Majority
Cebu City	2nd	Eduardo Rama Jr.	Lakas	2	Majority
Cotabato	1st	Edwin Cruzado	Lakas	1	Majority
Cotabato	2nd	Rudy Caoagdan	Nacionalista	3	Majority
Cotabato	3rd	Samantha Santos	Lakas	2	Majority
Davao City	1st	Paolo Duterte	HTL	3	Independent
Davao City	2nd	Omar Duterte	HTL	1	Independent
Davao City	3rd	Isidro Ungab	HTL	3	Independent
Davao de Oro	1st	Maricar Zamora	PFP	2	Majority
Davao de Oro	2nd	Jhong Ceniza	Lakas	1	Majority
Davao del Norte	1st	De Carlo Uy	Lakas	1	Majority
Davao del Norte	2nd	Jose Manuel Lagdameo	PFP	1	Majority
Davao del Sur	Lone	John Tracy Cagas	Lakas (Note: Affiliated with the Nacionalista Party at election.)	2	Majority
Davao Occidental	Lone	Claude Bautista	NPC	2	Majority
Davao Oriental	1st	Nelson Dayanghirang Jr.	Lakas	1	Majority
Davao Oriental	2nd	Cheeno Almario	NPC	3	Majority
Dinagat Islands	Lone	Kaka Bag-ao	Liberal	1	Minority
Eastern Samar	Lone	Sheen Gonzales	NUP	1	Minority
General Santos	Lone	Shirlyn Bañas-Nograles	PDP–Laban	1	Majority
Guimaras	Lone	JC Rahman Nava	NUP	1	Majority
Ifugao	Lone	Solomon Chungalao	NPC	3	Majority
Iligan	Lone	Celso Regencia	Lakas	2	Majority
Ilocos Norte	1st	Sandro Marcos	Lakas (Note: Affiliated with Partido Federal ng Pilipinas at election.)	2	Majority
Ilocos Norte	2nd	Eugenio Angelo Barba	Nacionalista	3	Majority
Ilocos Sur	1st	Ronald Singson	NPC	2	Majority
Ilocos Sur	2nd	Kristine Singson-Meehan	NPC	3	Majority
Iloilo	1st	Janette Garin	Lakas	3	Majority
Iloilo	2nd	Kathryn Joyce Gorriceta	Lakas	1	Majority
Iloilo	3rd	Lorenz Defensor	NUP	3	Majority
Iloilo	4th	Ferjenel Biron	Nacionalista	2	Majority
Iloilo	5th	Binky April Tupas	Lakas	1	Majority
Iloilo City	Lone	Julienne Baronda	Lakas	3	Majority
Isabela	1st	Tonypet Albano	PFP	3	Majority
Isabela	2nd	Ed Christopher Go	PFP	3	Majority
Isabela	3rd	Ian Paul Dy	Lakas	3	Majority
Isabela	4th	Joseph Tan	PFP	2	Majority
Isabela	5th	Mike Dy III	Lakas	3	Majority
Isabela	6th	Bojie Dy	PFP	1	Majority
Kalinga	Lone	Caroline Agyao	PFP	1	Majority
La Union	1st	Paolo Ortega	Lakas	2	Majority
La Union	2nd	Dante Garcia	Lakas	2	Majority
Laguna	1st	Ann Matibag	PFP	2	Majority
Laguna	2nd	Ramil Hernandez	Lakas	1	Majority
Laguna	3rd	Loreto Amante	PFP	2	Majority
Laguna	4th	Benjamin Agarao Jr.	PFP	1	Majority
Lanao del Norte	1st	Imelda Dimaporo	PFP	1	Majority
Lanao del Norte	2nd	Aminah Dimaporo	Lakas	2	Majority
Lanao del Sur	1st	Zia Alonto Adiong	Lakas	2	Majority
Lanao del Sur	2nd	Yasser Balindong	Lakas	3	Majority
Lapu-Lapu City	Lone	Junard Chan	PFP	1	Majority
Las Piñas	Lone	Mark Anthony Santos	NPC	1	Majority
Leyte	1st	Martin Romualdez (Note: Martin Romualdez was arrested on September 7, 2026, on plunder charges related to the flood control projects scandal.)	Lakas	3	Majority
Leyte	2nd	Lolita Javier	NPC	3	Majority
Leyte	3rd	Anna Veloso-Tuazon	NUP	2	Majority
Leyte	4th	Richard Gomez	PFP	2	Majority
Leyte	5th	Carl Cari	Lakas	3	Majority
Maguindanao del Norte	Lone	Dimple Mastura	Lakas	2	Majority
Maguindanao del Sur	Lone	Esmael Mangudadatu	PFP	1	Majority
Makati	1st	Monique Lagdameo	MKTZNU	1	Majority
Makati	2nd	Alden Almario	MKTZNU	1	Majority
Malabon	Lone	Antolin Oreta III	NUP	1	Majority
Mandaluyong	Lone	Alexandria Gonzales	NUP	1	Majority
Mandaue	Lone	Emmarie Dizon	Lakas	3	Majority
Manila	1st	Ernix Dionisio	NUP	2	Majority
Manila	2nd	Rolan Valeriano	NUP	3	Majority
Manila	3rd	Joel Chua	NUP	2	Majority
Manila	4th	Giselle Lazaro-Maceda	NPC (Note: Affiliated with Asenso Manileño at election.)	1	Majority
Manila	5th	Irwin Tieng	NUP	2	Majority
Manila	6th	Benny Abante (Note: Benny Abante took office on July 8, 2025, after the Second Division of the Commission on Elections (COMELEC) nullified the candidacy of his sole opponent in the election, Joey Uy (Aksyon), on June 18, 2025, due to citizenship issues. The COMELEC en banc affirmed the nullification of Uy's candidacy on June 30, 2025. Prior to the nullification of his candidacy, Uy had received the most number of votes in the election.)	NUP	0	Majority
Marikina	1st	Marcelino Teodoro (Note: Marcelino Teodoro took office on July 1, 2025, after having his proclamation as representative-elect initially suspended.)	NUP	0	Majority
Marikina	2nd	Miro Quimbo	PFP	1	Majority
Marinduque	Lone	Reynaldo Salvacion	Lakas	1	Majority
Masbate	1st	Antonio Kho	Lakas	1	Majority
Masbate	2nd	Olga Kho	Lakas	1	Majority
Masbate	3rd	Wilton Kho	Lakas	3	Majority
Misamis Occidental	1st	Jason Almonte	Nacionalista	2	Majority
Misamis Occidental	2nd	Ando Oaminal	Lakas	2	Majority
Misamis Oriental	1st	Karen Lagbas	NUP	1	Majority
Misamis Oriental	2nd	Yevgeny Emano	Nacionalista	2	Majority
Mountain Province	Lone	Maximo Dalog Jr.	Nacionalista	3	Majority
Muntinlupa	Lone	Jaime Fresnedi	Liberal	2	Majority
Navotas	Lone	Toby Tiangco	Navoteño	2	Majority
Negros Occidental	1st	Jules Ledesma	NPC	1	Majority
Negros Occidental	2nd	Alfredo Marañon III	NUP	2	Majority
Negros Occidental	3rd	Javi Benitez	PFP	1	Majority
Negros Occidental	4th	Jeffrey Ferrer	NUP	1	Majority
Negros Occidental	5th	Dino Yulo	Lakas	2	Majority
Negros Occidental	6th	Mercedes Alvarez-Lansang	NPC	2	Majority
Negros Oriental	1st	Emmanuel Iway	PFP	1	Majority
Negros Oriental	2nd	Maisa Sagarbarria	Lakas	1	Majority
Negros Oriental	3rd	Janice Degamo	Lakas	1	Majority
Northern Samar	1st	Niko Raul Daza	NUP	1	Minority
Northern Samar	2nd	Edwin Ongchuan	PFP	1	Majority
Nueva Ecija	1st	Mika Suansing	PFP	2	Majority
Nueva Ecija	2nd	Kokoy Salvador	PFP	1	Majority
Nueva Ecija	3rd	Jay Vergara	PFP	1	Majority
Nueva Ecija	4th	Emeng Pascual	NUP	2	Majority
Nueva Vizcaya	Lone	Tim Cayton	PFP (Note: Affiliated with Aksyon Demokratiko at election.)	1	Majority
Occidental Mindoro	Lone	Odie Tarriela	PFP	2	Majority
Oriental Mindoro	1st	Arnan Panaligan	Lakas	2	Majority
Oriental Mindoro	2nd	Alfonso Umali Jr.	Liberal	3	Majority
Palawan	1st	Rosalie Salvame	NUP (Note: Affiliated with the People's Reform Party at election.)	1	Majority
Palawan	2nd	Jose Alvarez	NPC	2	Majority
Palawan	3rd	Gil Acosta Jr.	NPC	1	Majority
Pampanga	1st	Carmelo Lazatin Jr.	PFP	1	Majority
Pampanga	2nd	Gloria Macapagal Arroyo	Lakas	2	Majority
Pampanga	3rd	Mica Gonzales	Lakas	1	Majority
Pampanga	4th	Anna York Bondoc	NUP	2	Majority
Pangasinan	1st	Arthur Celeste	Nacionalista	2	Majority
Pangasinan	2nd	Mark Cojuangco	NPC	2	Majority
Pangasinan	3rd	Maria Rachel Arenas	Lakas	2	Majority
Pangasinan	4th	Gina de Venecia	Lakas	1	Majority
Pangasinan	5th	Ramon Guico Jr.	Lakas	2	Majority
Pangasinan	6th	Marlyn Primicias-Agabas	Lakas	2	Majority
Parañaque	1st	Eric Olivarez	Lakas	1	Majority
Parañaque	2nd	Brian Yamsuan	NUP	1	Majority
Pasay	Lone	Antonino Calixto	Lakas	3	Majority
Pasig	Lone	Roman Romulo	NPC	3	Majority
Quezon	1st	Mark Enverga	NPC	3	Majority
Quezon	2nd	David Suarez	Lakas	3	Majority
Quezon	3rd	Reynante Arrogancia	NPC	2	Majority
Quezon	4th	Keith Micah Tan	NPC	2	Majority
Quezon City	1st	Arjo Atayde	NUP (Note: Elected in 2025 under Nacionalista Party.)	2	Majority
Quezon City	2nd	Ralph Tulfo	PFP	2	Majority
Quezon City	3rd	Franz Pumaren	NUP	2	Majority
Quezon City	4th	Bong Suntay	NPC (Note: Affiliated with the United Nationalist Alliance at election.)	1	Majority
Quezon City	5th	Patrick Michael Vargas	PFP	2	Majority
Quezon City	6th	Marivic Co-Pilar	NUP	2	Majority
Quirino	Lone	Midy Cua	Lakas	2	Majority
Rizal	1st	Mia Ynares	NPC	1	Majority
Rizal	2nd	Dino Tanjuatco	NPC	2	Majority
Rizal	3rd	Jose Arturo Garcia Jr.	NPC	2	Majority
Rizal	4th	Dennis Hernandez	NPC	1	Majority
Romblon	Lone	Eleandro Jesus Madrona	Nacionalista	3	Majority
Samar	1st	Stephen James Tan	Nacionalista	2	Minority
Samar	2nd	Reynolds Michael Tan	Lakas	2	Minority
San Jose del Monte	Lone	Arthur Robes	Lakas	1	Majority
San Juan	Lone	Bel Zamora	Lakas	2	Majority
Santa Rosa	Lone	Roy Gonzales	PFP	1	Majority
Sarangani	Lone	Steve Solon	NUP	2	Majority
Siquijor	Lone	Zaldy Villa	PFP	2	Majority
Sorsogon	1st	Dette Escudero	NPC	2	Majority
Sorsogon	2nd	Wowo Fortes	NPC	2	Majority
South Cotabato	1st	Ed Lumayag	PFP	2	Majority
South Cotabato	2nd	Dinand Hernandez	PFP	1	Majority
South Cotabato	3rd	Dibu Tuan	Lakas	1	Majority
Southern Leyte	1st	Roger Mercado	PFP	1	Majority
Southern Leyte	2nd	Christopherson Yap	NUP	2	Majority
Sultan Kudarat	1st	Ruth Sakaluran	Lakas	1	Majority
Sultan Kudarat	2nd	Bella Suansing	PFP	1	Majority
Sulu	1st	Samier Tan	Lakas	3	Majority
Sulu	2nd	Abdulmunir Arbison	Lakas	1	Majority
Surigao del Norte	1st	Francisco Matugas	PFP	1	Majority
Surigao del Norte	2nd	Bernadette Barbers	Nacionalista	1	Majority
Surigao del Sur	1st	Romeo Momo	Nacionalista	2	Majority
Surigao del Sur	2nd	Alexander Pimentel	PFP	1	Majority
Taguig–Pateros	1st	Ading Cruz	Nacionalista	2	Majority
Taguig	2nd	Daniel Bocobo	Nacionalista	1	Majority
Tarlac	1st	Jaime Cojuangco	NPC	2	Majority
Tarlac	2nd	Cristy Angeles	PFP	1	Majority
Tarlac	3rd	Bong Rivera	NPC	2	Majority
Tawi-Tawi	Lone	Dimszar Sali	NUP	2	Majority
Valenzuela	1st	Kenneth Gatchalian	NPC	1	Majority
Valenzuela	2nd	Gerald Galang	Lakas	1	Majority
Zambales	1st	Jay Khonghun	Lakas	2	Majority
Zambales	2nd	Bing Maniquiz	Lakas	2	Majority
Zamboanga City	1st	Kat Chua	PFP	1	Majority
Zamboanga City	2nd	Jerry Perez	NUP (Note: Affiliated with the Adelante Zamboanga Party at election.)	1	Majority
Zamboanga del Norte	1st	Pinpin Uy	Lakas	2	Majority
Zamboanga del Norte	2nd	Irene Labadlabad	Lakas	1	Majority
Zamboanga del Norte	3rd	Ian Amatong	Liberal	2	Majority
Zamboanga del Sur	1st	Joseph Yu	Lakas	1	Majority
Zamboanga del Sur	2nd	Victoria Yu	Lakas	2	Majority
Zamboanga Sibugay	1st	Marlo Bancoro	PFP	1	Majority
Zamboanga Sibugay	2nd	Marly Hofer–Hasim	PFP	1	Majority
Party-list		Rodge Gutierrez	1-Rider	2	Majority
Party-list		Nat Oducado (Note: Nat Oducado resigned on May 18, 2026.)	1Tahanan	1	Majority
Party-list		Elmer Catulpos (Note: Elmer Catulpos took office on June 3, 2026, to succeed Nat Oducado.)	1Tahanan	0	Majority
Party-list		Iris Marie Montes	4K	1	Minority
Party-list		Marcelino Libanan	4Ps	2	Minority
Party-list		Jonathan Clement Abalos	4Ps	2	Minority
Party-list		Maximo Rodriguez Jr.	Abamin	1	Majority
Party-list		Manuel Frederick Ko	Abang Lingkod	1	Majority
Party-list		Robert Raymond Estrella (Note: Robert Raymond Estrella took office on October 2, 2025, after three seats for party-list representatives were reallocated due to the cancellation of the Duterte Youth's registration by the Commission on Elections on August 29, 2025.)	Abono	0	Majority
Party-list		Antonio Tinio	ACT Teachers	1	Minority
Party-list		Edvic Yap (Note: Edvic Yap resigned on February 4, 2026.)	ACT-CIS	2	Majority
Party-list		Jocelyn Tulfo	ACT-CIS	3	Majority
Party-list		Jeffrey Soriano (Note: Jeffrey Soriano took office on March 11, 2026, to succeed Edvic Yap.)	ACT-CIS	0	Majority
Party-list		Nicanor Briones	AGAP	2	Minority
Party-list		Bryan Revilla	Agimat	2	Majority
Party-list		Chel Diokno	Akbayan	1	Minority
Party-list		Perci Cendaña	Akbayan	1	Minority
Party-list		Dadah Kiram Ismula	Akbayan	1	Minority
Party-list		Zaldy Co (Note: Zaldy Co resigned on September 29, 2025.)	Ako Bicol	3	Majority
Party-list		Alfredo Garbin	Ako Bicol	1	Majority
Party-list		Jan Franz Chan (Note: Jan Franz Chan took office on January 26, 2026, to succeed Zaldy Co.)	Ako Bicol	0	Majority
Party-list		Sonny Lagon	Ako Bisaya	3	Majority
Party-list		Richelle Singson-Michael	Ako Ilocano Ako	2	Majority
Party-list		Maria Cristina Lopez	Alona	1	Majority
Party-list		Alfred delos Santos (Note: Alfred delos Santos took office on October 2, 2025, after three seats for party-list representatives were reallocated due to the cancellation of the Duterte Youth's registration by the Commission on Elections on August 29, 2025.)	Ang Probinsyano	0	Majority
Party-list		Sergio Dagooc	APEC	3	Minority
Party-list		Henry Oaminal Jr.	Asenso Pinoy	1	Majority
Party-list		Roberto Nazal Jr.	BH	1	Minority
Party-list		Terry Ridon	Bicol Saro	1	Majority
Party-list		Eddie Villanueva	CIBAC	3	Majority
Party-list		Felimon Espares	Coop-NATCCO	2	Majority
Party-list		Edwin Gardiola	CWS	2	Majority
Party-list		Claudine Bautista-Lim	DUMPER PTDA	3	Majority
Party-list		Brian Poe	FPJ Panday Bayanihan	1	Majority
Party-list		Sarah Elago (Note: Sarah Elago took office on September 23, 2025, after the Commission on Elections allocated one additional seat for party-list representatives.)	Gabriela	0	Minority
Party-list		Jan Rurik Padiernos	GP	1	Minority
Party-list		Renee Co	Kabataan	1	Minority
Party-list		Caroline Tanchay	Kamalayan	2	Majority
Party-list		Eli San Fernando	Kamanggagawa	1	Minority
Party-list		Munir Arbison Jr.	Kapuso PM	2	Majority
Party-list		Kenneth Paolo Tereng	KM Ngayon Na	1	Majority
Party-list		Aiman Tan	Kusug Tausug	1	Majority
Party-list		Allan Ty	LPGMA	3	Minority
Party-list		Ferdinand Beltran	Magbubukid	1	Majority
Party-list		Girlie Veloso	Malasakit@Bayanihan	1	Majority
Party-list		Leila de Lima	ML	1	Minority
Party-list		Maria Nina Francesca Lacson	Manila Teachers	1	Majority
Party-list		Arthur C. Yap (Note: Arthur C. Yap took office on October 2, 2025, after three seats for party-list representatives were reallocated due to the cancellation of the Duterte Youth's registration by the Commission on Elections on August 29, 2025.)	Murang Kuryente	0	Majority
Party-list		Florabel Yatco	Nanay	1	Majority
Party-list		Maria Kristina Jihan Glepa	One Coop	1	Majority
Party-list		Presley de Jesus	Philreca	3	Minority
Party-list		Franz Vincent Legazpi (Note: Franz Vincent Legazpi was included in the list of representatives on August 6, 2025. He resigned on May 18, 2026.)	Pinoy Workers	1	Majority
Party-list		Karl Josef Legazpi (Note: Karl Josef Legazpi took office on May 20, 2026, to succeed Franz Vincent Legazpi.)	Pinoy Workers	0	Majority
Party-list		Harold Duterte	PPP	1	Independent
Party-list		Jernie Jett Nisay	Pusong Pinoy	1	Minority
Party-list		Paolo Marcoleta	SAGIP	1	Minority
Party-list		Rodolfo Ordanes	Senior Citizens	2	Majority
Party-list		Ching Bernos	Solid North	2	Majority
Party-list		Rolando Macasaet	SSS-GSIS Pensyonado	1	Majority
Party-list		Arlyn Ayon	Swerte	1	Minority
Party-list		Jose Teves Jr.	TGP	3	Majority
Party-list		Andrew Julian Romualdez	Tingog	1	Majority
Party-list		Jude Acidre	Tingog	2	Majority
Party-list		Marie Josephine Calatrava (Note: Marie Josephine Calatrava resigned on July 9, 2025.)	Tingog	1	—
Party-list		Yedda Romualdez (Note: Yedda Romualdez was proclaimed as a representative by the Commission on Elections on July 16, 2025, to succeed Marie Josephine Calatrava.)	Tingog	0	Majority
Party-list		Johanne Monich Bautista	Trabaho	1	Majority
Party-list		Raymond Mendoza	TUCP	3	Majority
Party-list		Milagros Magsaysay	United Senior Citizens	1	Majority
Party-list		Jojo Ang	Uswag Ilonggo	2	Majority

== Changes in membership ==
=== Senate ===
Member
Member	Party	Date	Reason
Jinggoy Estrada	PMP	June 22, 2026	Suspended for 90 days
Jinggoy Estrada	PMP	October 12, 2026	Suspended for 90 days
Rodante Marcoleta	Independent	October 19, 2026	Suspended for 90 days

=== House of Representatives ===
==== District representatives ====
District	Member				Special election	Successor		
District	Member	Party	Date	Reason	Special election	Member	Party	Date
Cavite–4th	Kiko Barzaga	Independent	December 1, 2025	Suspended for 60 days	—			
Cavite–4th	Kiko Barzaga	Independent	February 4, 2026	Suspended for 60 days	—			
Cavite–4th	Kiko Barzaga	PDP–Laban	June 2, 2026	Expelled	August 29, 2026	Jenny Barzaga	NUP	September 1, 2026
Antipolo–2nd	Romeo Acop	NUP	December 20, 2025	Died in office	March 14, 2026	Bong Acop	NUP	March 16, 2026
Batanes–Lone	Jun Gato	NPC	September 21, 2026	Died in office	November 28, 2026	TBA		
Tarlac–3rd	Bong Rivera	NPC	September 30, 2026	Suspended for 90 days	—			

==== Party-list representatives ====
Member	Party	Date	Reason	Successor	Took office
Marie Josephine Calatrava	Tingog	July 9, 2025	Resigned	Yedda Romualdez	July 18, 2025
Zaldy Co	Ako Bicol	September 29, 2025	Resigned	Jan Franz Chan	January 26, 2026
Edvic Yap	ACT-CIS	February 4, 2026	Resigned	Jeffrey Soriano	March 11, 2026
Franz Vincent Legazpi	Pinoy Workers	May 18, 2026	Resigned	Karl Josef Legaspi	May 20, 2026
Nathaniel Oducado	1Tahanan	May 18, 2026	Resigned	Elmer Catulpos	June 3, 2026
Jojo Ang	Uswag Ilonggo	September 22, 2026	Suspended for 90 days	—	

== Committees ==
=== Constitutional bodies ===
Committee	Senate						House of Representatives							
Committee	Chairman	Party	Since	Minority leader	Party	Since	Chairman	Party	District	Since	Minority leader	Party	District	Since
Commission on Appointments	Sherwin Gatchalian	NPC	June 3, 2026	Joel Villanueva	Independent	September 24, 2025	Ramon Guico Jr.	Lakas	Pangasinan–5th	August 26, 2025	Tonypet Albano	PFP	Isabela–1st	August 26, 2025
Judicial and Bar Council	Kiko Pangilinan	Liberal	June 3, 2026				Gerville Luistro	Lakas	Batangas–2nd	July 30, 2025				
Senate Electoral Tribunal	Vacant		May 11, 2026	Vacant		May 11, 2026								
House of Representatives Electoral Tribunal							Bel Zamora	Lakas	San Juan	August 5, 2025	Jan Rurik Padiernos	GP	Party-list	October 20, 2025

== Evaluation ==
After the ouster of Senate President Tito Sotto on May 11, 2026 amidst the second impeachment of Vice President Sara Duterte, lawyer and former congressman Barry Gutierrez considered the Senate to have drastically declined as an institution compared to previous congresses, citing its various members' inclination to using constitutional crises as part of their "political toolkit" and the diminishing of accountability through the senate's practices. Gutierrez stated that "I never thought I'd see the day that the House of Representatives would be more respectable than the Senate", and unfavorably compared the Senate's avoidance of an impeachment trial during the 20th Congress to the Senate that tackled the 2000–2001 impeachment trial of President Joseph Estrada despite his numerous allies in the Senate body.
