= Sally Ante Lee =

Filipino politician

Sally Velasquez Ante-Lee

Governor of Sorsogon
- In office June 30, 2007 – June 30, 2010
- Preceded by: Raul R. Lee
- Succeeded by: Raul R. Lee

Mayor of Sorsogon City
- In office June 30, 2001 – June 30, 2007

Personal details
- Born: July 26, 1942 (age 84) Lapog (now San Juan), Ilocos Sur, Philippines
- Spouse: Raul R. Lee
- Occupation: Politician, certified public accountant

Sally Velasquez Ante-Lee (born July 26, 1942) is a Filipino politician who last served as the Governor of Sorsogon from 2007 to 2010. Previously, she served as Mayor of Sorsogon City from 2001 to 2007. She is the first woman to hold such positions. She is the wife of Raul R. Lee, who succeeded her as Governor in 2010.

== Biography ==
Ally Velasquez Ante Lee was born on July 26, 1942, in Lapog (present-day San Juan), Ilocos Sur. She then moved to Sorsogon in 1966. Lee is a certified public accountant in profession.

== Career ==
Lee has been involved in her community specially in evangelization and social services. She has been exposed in politics since 1970s because of her husband.

On September 8, 2009, during her term as governor, the Japan International Cooperation Agency carried out the Japan Overseas Cooperation Volunteer (JOCV) Program Seminar in Sorsogon City, Sorsogon.
