= Governor of Sorsogon =

Local chief executive

- Gobernador ng Lalawigan ng Sorsogon
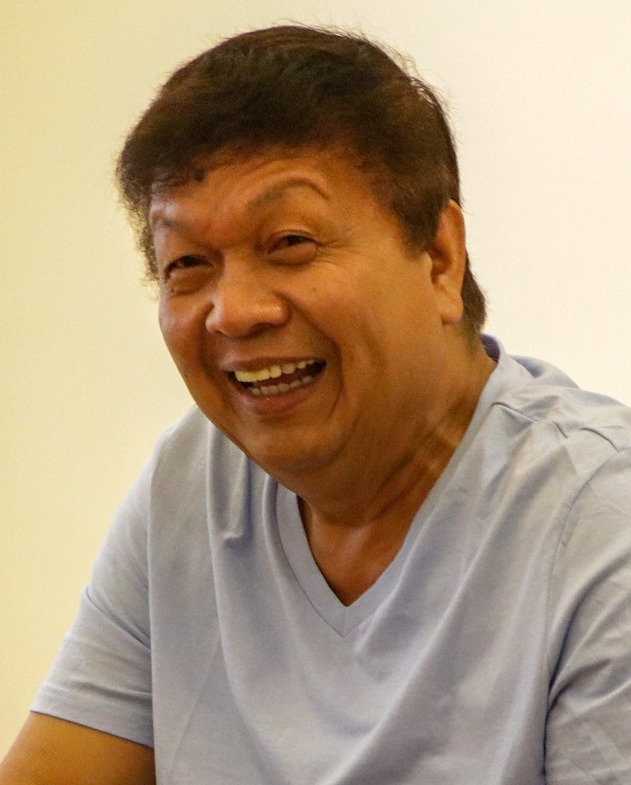
- Incumbent; Jose Edwin B. Hamor since June 30, 2022
- Style: The Honorable
- Term length: 3 years
- Inaugural holder: Jose de la Guardia
- Formation: 1894

The governor of Sorsogon is the local chief executive of the province of Sorsogon, Philippines. Like all local government heads in the Philippines, the governor is elected via popular vote, and may not be elected for a fourth consecutive term (although the former governor may return to office after an interval of one term). In case of death, resignation or incapacity, the vice governor becomes the governor.

== List of governors ==
№	Name	Portrait	Term Began	Term Ended	Ref.
1	John Dellosa		1894	1895	
2	Guillermo Montes Salienda Salazar		1895	1896	
3	Marquez de la Vastida		1897	1898	
4	Leandro Villamil		1898	1899	
5	Celestino Mercader		1900	1901	
6	Dr. Bernardino Monreal M.D.		1902	1908	
7	Mario Guariña		1908	1912	
8	Victor Eco		1913	1916	
9	Jose Zurbito (Jose Zurbito y Cervantes)		1917	1919	
10	Jose Figueroa (Jose Figueroa y Tormo)		1920	1922	
11	Bernabe F. Palma (Bernabe Flores Palma)		1923	1925	
12	Pelagio Guamil		1926	1928	
13	Juan S. Reyes		1929	1931	
14	Silverio Garcia M.D.		1931	1934	
15	Teodisio R. Diño		1935	1941	
16	Teodoro de Vera		1941	1942	
(14)	Silverio Garcia M.D.		1942	1944	
17	Vicente L. Peralta		1945	1945	
18	Salvador C. Escudero Sr. (Salvador Casals Escudero)		1946	1955	
19	Juan G. Frivaldo (Juan Gallanosa Frivaldo)		1955	1967	
20	Augusto Ortiz		1967	1971	
(19)	Juan G. Frivaldo (Juan Gallanosa Frivaldo)		1971	1978	
21	Raul R. Lee (Raul Rodrigueza Lee)		1978	1986	
–	Elizalde Diaz		1986	1986	
–	Bonifacio Gillego		1986	1987	
(21)	Raul R. Lee (Raul Rodrigueza Lee)		1987	1987	
–	Henry Fajardo		1987	1988	
(19)	Juan G. Frivaldo (Juan Gallanosa Frivaldo)		1988	1989	
–	Cleto Arnedo		1989	1992	
(19)	Juan G. Frivaldo (Juan Gallanosa Frivaldo)		1992	1995	
(21)	Raul R. Lee (Raul Rodrigueza Lee)		1995	1996	
(19)	Juan G. Frivaldo (Juan Gallanosa Frivaldo)		1996	1998	
(21)	Raul R. Lee (Raul Rodrigueza Lee)		1998	2007	
22	Sally Ante Lee (Sally Velasquez Ante-Lee)		2007	2010	
(21)	Raul R. Lee (Raul Rodrigueza Lee)		2010	2016	
23	Robert "Bobet" Lee Rodrigueza (Robert Ante Lee Rodrigueza)		2016	2019	
24	Francis "Chiz" Escudero (Francis Joseph Guevarra Escudero)		2019	2022	
25	Jose Edwin Hamor (Jose Edwin Brondial Hamor)		2022	Incumbent; Term expires June 30, 2028	
