= September 2025 President of the Senate of the Philippines election =

55th leadership election in the Philippine Senate

- September 8, 2025

All 24 members of the Senate 13 votes needed to win
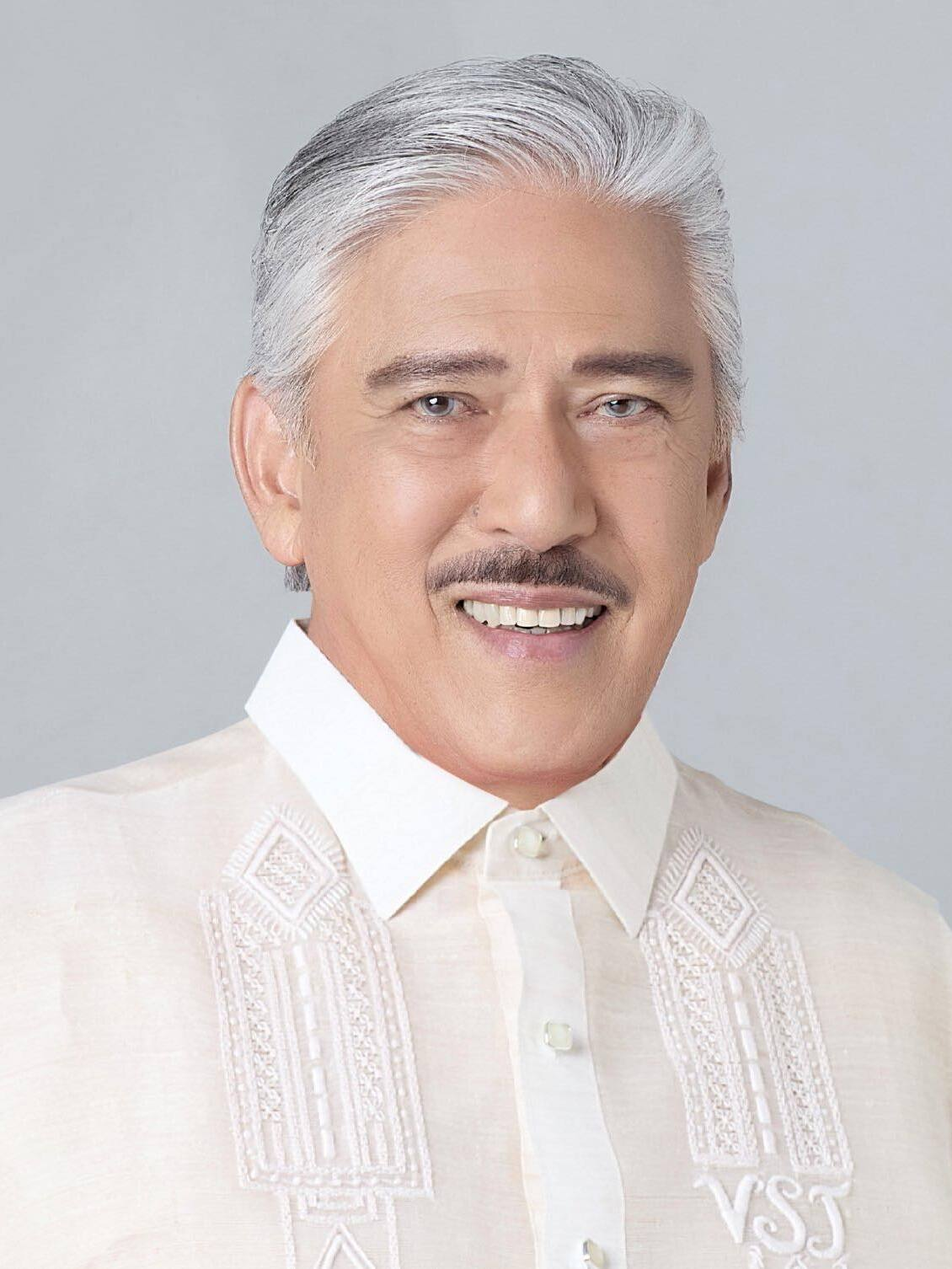
Nominee	Tito Sotto
Party	NPC
Senatorial vote	24
Percentage	100.00%
- Bloc composition of the Senate of the Philippines after the election
Senate President before election
Francis Escudero
NPC
Elected Senate President
Tito Sotto
NPC

An election for the president of the Senate of the Philippines was suddenly held on September 8, 2025. It was the second leadership election of the Senate in the 20th Congress and was the 55th election for the Senate presidency in the chamber's history.

This election by acclamation ousted incumbent Senate president Francis Escudero and installed Minority Leader Tito Sotto as president of the Senate, a position he previously held in the 18th Congress from 2018 to 2022. This was the first leadership election in the Senate since November 13, 2000 that happened in the same year when a previous leadership election also took place.

== Background ==
On July 28, 2025, the opening of the 20th Congress, Escudero was re-elected as Senate president defeating Sotto. When vice president Sara Duterte was impeached in the House of Representatives on February 5, 2025, the Senate was obliged to immediately constitute itself as an impeachment court. However, the Senate went into congressional recess without tackling the impeachment. Escudero pushed back saying that the Senate will act as an impeachment court once session resumes on June 2, 2025 after the 2025 Philippine Senate election, and this received criticism from many due to Escudero's "delaying tactics". On August 11, 2025, Rappler reported that Lawrence R. Lubiano, president of Centerways Construction, was Escudero's top donor for his campaign in the 2022 Senate election. Centerways is among the top 15 earning firms involved in flood control as revealed by President Bongbong Marcos in the 2025 State of the Nation Address when he raised the possibility that there might be irregularities in the government's flood control efforts.

== Electoral system ==
The Senate president is elected by a majority vote of the members of the Senate from among themselves. Since there are 24 senators, 13 votes are needed to win the Senate presidency, including any vacant seats or senators not attending the session. Although Senate presidents are elected at the start of each Congress, there had been numerous instances of Senate leadership elections in which a sitting Senate president has been unseated in the middle of a session. Term-sharing agreements among senators who are both eyeing the position of the Senate president also played a role in changing the leadership of the Senate, but in a smooth manner, through the peaceful transition of power. Three known instances were in 1999, 2006, and 2018.

Newly elected Senate presidents are traditionally sworn in by the youngest senator, known as the "Benjamin" of the chamber, usually one belonging to the majority bloc, as in the cases of Bam Aquino administering the oath of office to Franklin Drilon in 2013, Manny Pacquiao to Koko Pimentel in 2016, Mark Villar to Francis Escudero in 2024, and Camille Villar to Alan Peter Cayetano in 2026.

Unlike the symbolic presiding officers of upper houses in some other governments, the Senate president of the Philippines has considerable power to influence the legislative agenda, and has a normal vote rather than acting only as a tie-breaker, though the tradition that the presiding officer is the last to vote has been maintained. A tied vote in the Senate therefore means that the motion is lost; the Senate president, having already voted in the normal way, cannot also cast a tie-breaking vote.

== Election ==
=== Leadership coup ===
On September 8, 2025, Senator Juan Miguel Zubiri made the motion to declare the position of Senate president vacant which was approved by Escudero. Zubiri then nominated Sotto for Senate president, after which Senator Loren Legarda seconded the nomination. Sotto became the sole nominee and was elected by acclamation.

=== Results ===
September 2025 election for the president of the Senate
Party	Nominee	Nominated by	Votes	%
NPC	Tito Sotto	Juan Miguel Zubiri	24	100.00
Total votes			24	100.00

Senators who supported the leadership change
No.	Senator	Party	Original bloc
1	Bam Aquino	KANP	Majority
2	Pia Cayetano	Nacionalista	Majority
3	JV Ejercito	NPC	Majority
4	Win Gatchalian	NPC	Majority
5	Risa Hontiveros	Akbayan	Minority
6	Panfilo Lacson	Independent	Minority
7	Lito Lapid	NPC	Majority
8	Loren Legarda	NPC	Minority
9	Kiko Pangilinan	Liberal	Majority
10	Tito Sotto	NPC	Minority
11	Raffy Tulfo	Independent	Majority
12	Erwin Tulfo	Lakas	Majority
13	Mark Villar	Nacionalista	Majority
14	Camille Villar	Nacionalista	Majority
15	Juan Miguel Zubiri	Independent	Minority

== Aftermath ==
After Sotto's victory, Senators Panfilo Lacson and Juan Miguel Zubiri were chosen as the president pro tempore and majority floor leader, respectively. A day after the election, on September 9, 2025, Senator Alan Peter Cayetano was chosen as the new Senate minority leader by the newly-formed minority. The senators that formed the new minority bloc were senators Cayetano, Escudero, Joel Villanueva, Bong Go, Rodante Marcoleta, Imee Marcos, Robin Padilla, Jinggoy Estrada, and Ronald dela Rosa. On September 25, 2025, Roberto Bernardo named Escudero along with two former senators as recipients of alleged kickbacks from government flood control projects. Bernardo alleged that he personally delivered ₱160,000,000 million to Maynard Ngu, one of Escudero's top doners. Mark Villar was also named by Bernardo when Villar was the secretary of Department of Public Works and Highways. Senators Villanueva and Estrada were also linked to flood control projects.
