= Stansbury (surname) =

Stansbury is a surname. Notable people with the surname include:

- Chris Stansbury, American politician
- Ele Stansbury (1861–1929), American politician
- Elijah Stansbury Jr. (1791–1883), American politician and soldier
- Howard Stansbury (1806–1863), U.S. Army Corps of Topographical Engineers officer, and leader of the Stansbury Expedition to Utah in 1851
- Jack Stansbury (1885–1970), American baseball player
- John Stansbury (1788–1814), American naval officer
- Melanie Stansbury (born 1979), American politician and scientist
- Rick Stansbury (born 1959), American college basketball coach
- Terence Stansbury (born 1961), American basketball player
- Tiffany Stansbury (born 1983), American basketball player
- Timothy Stansbury, New York City teenager shot dead by a police officer in 2004
- Todd Stansbury, Canadian–American athlete and university sports administrator
- William B. Stansbury (1923–1985), mayor of Louisville, Kentucky, US

Fictional characters

- Cheryl Stansbury, fictional character on the ABC soap opera General Hospital

== See also ==
- Stanbury (surname)
