= Rafi Escudero =

Puerto Rican musician

- Born: Rafael A. Escudero Miranda; December 30, 1945 (age 80); San Juan, Puerto Rico
- Genres: Danza, Ballad, Salsa, Seis Junqueño
- Occupations: Musician, Singer, Composer, Poet, Producer, Sub-Director Federal Immigration Services and a Political Activist.
- Instruments: Piano, Violin and Güiro

Rafi Escudero (born December 30, 1945) is a Puerto Rican musician, singer, composer, poet and political activist.

== Early years ==
Escudero was born and raised in San Juan, Puerto Rico the capital city of the island. His parents were well aware that their son was musically inclined at a young age. They also stressed that their son receive a good education and sent him to study in private schools. They wanted their son to learn about classical music and contracted the services of violin teacher Eduardo Geigel to teach Escudero how to play the violin. When Escudero wasn't in school or taking violin classes, he would spend hours on the family piano until he finally taught himself how to play. He perfected his piano playing by taking piano lessons from the maestro Pedro Escabi.

== Early influences ==
During the 1960s, he enrolled in the University of Puerto Rico where he studied humanities. As a student in the university, he was exposed to the works of some of Puerto Rico's greatest poets: Gustavo Pales Matos (who was his friend and mentor), Antonio Machado, Julia de Burgos and Juan Antonio Corretjer. The works of these poets greatly influenced Escudero and where to serve as the basis for his inspiration.

== Modern Danzas ==
Escudero debuted as a composer with the recording modernized versions of classical danzas. "Lo que yo quiero ser", originally recorded by Pijuan's Sextet and interpreted by Anibal Hernandez, became a national hit contributing to what has been labeled as the renaissance of the Danza. Danny Rivera, recognized as Puerto Rico's "national voice", recorded "Añoranzas", "Carta a Juan Morel" and "Caricias". The recordings were a success and Escudero received the acceptance and recognition from the public and fellow musicians alike.

During the 1970s, Escudero composed many songs that were recorded by the following singers, Danny Rivera, Marco Antonio Muñiz, Jose Feliciano, Cheo Feliciano, Ismael Miranda and many others. Escudero recorded 'Sin tu Amor" (Without your Love), "Cuando el amor germina", "Repica ese guiro y canta" and "Pa' cortase las venas". He also participated with dozens of Latin American singers in the recording of "Somos el Projimo" (We're your neighbor) which was the Latin-American version of "We Are The World". Escudero, appeared in the film "Under Suspicion" starring Morgan Freeman and Gene Hackman as a Ballroom musician and performed on the song "Party Man" written by Miguel Zayas.

== Selection of Danza's by Escudero ==
External audio
- You may listen to Luciano Quiñones piano interpretation of Escudero's "Añoranzas" here

The following is a list of some of Escudero's Danza's:

- Añoranza
- Caricias
- Carta a Morel

== Poet ==
Escudero has written two books of poetry and poetic prose. The first book was titled "En un Mundo de Cuerdos", published by the Puerto Rican Institute of Culture the second book "Comentario desde el Soberao". In 1999, he recorded "Comentario desde el Soberao" where he musically references the situations and characters in his book. This was the first time that a poet/musician combined his writings and music together in a multi-media presentation.

== Awards and recognitions ==
Among the many awards and recognitions bestowed upon Escudero are the following, The Agüeybaná de Oro for composer of the year 1981 and the Outstanding Singer Award in the Record Festivals from 1983 to 1985. Escudero was also exalted into the Puerto Rico Music Hall of Fame on May 12, 2018.

== Political activist ==
In 1998, Escudero was named by Puerto Rico's governor Pedro Rosselló to join the board of directors of the Puerto Rican Institute of Culture and of the Luis A. Ferre Center for the Performing Arts (Centro de Bellas Arts). In 2001, he ran for the position of president of the New Progressive Party of Puerto Rico, however he withdrew from the race. Escudero currently remains politically active in the party.

== See also ==
- List of Puerto Ricans
