= July 2025 President of the Senate of the Philippines election =

54th leadership election in the Philippine Senate

- July 28, 2025

All 24 members of the Senate 13 votes needed to win
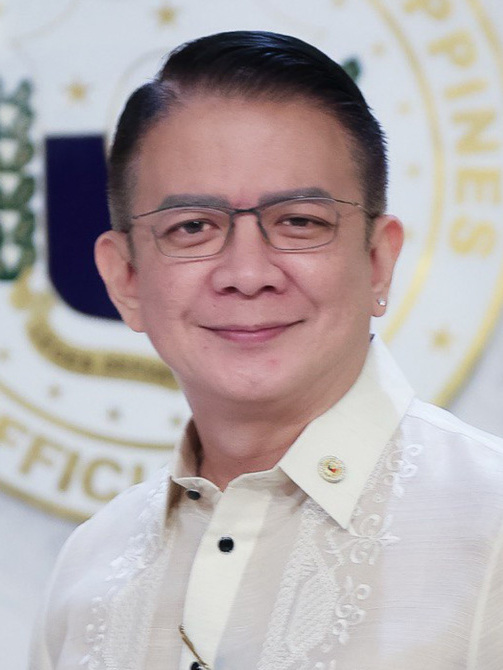

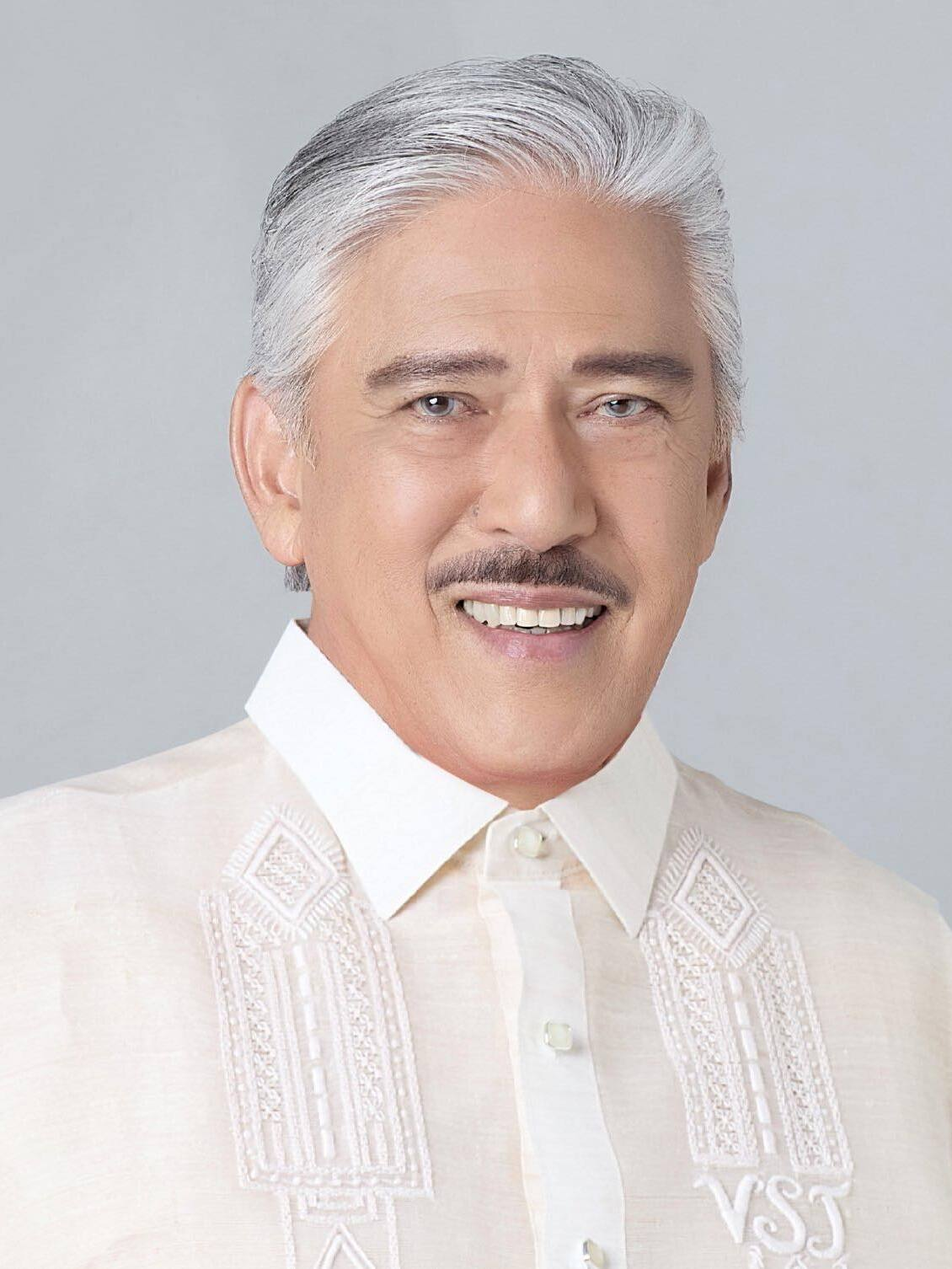
| Nominee | Francis Escudero | Tito Sotto |
| Party | NPC | NPC |
| Senatorial vote | 19 | 5 |
| Percentage | 79.17% | 20.83% |
- Bloc composition of the Senate of the Philippines after the election
Senate President before election
Francis Escudero
NPC
Elected Senate President
Francis Escudero
NPC

An election for the president and president pro tempore of the Senate of the Philippines was held on July 28, 2025. It was the first leadership election of the Senate in the 20th Congress and the 54th election for the Senate presidency in the chamber's history.

This election was expectedly held at the beginning of the 20th Congress and incumbent Senate president Francis Escudero was re-elected and defeated former Senate president Tito Sotto.

== Background ==
Escudero was elected as Senate president on May 20, 2024 shortly after then incumbent Senate president Juan Miguel Zubiri resigned from the post. On February 5, 2025, Vice President Sara Duterte was impeached in the House of Representatives. However, Escudero adjourned the Senate before the articles of impeachments were tackled due to a congressional break that would resume back on June 2, 2025. The Senate is obliged to convene as an impeachment court to process the complaints but there was no immediate schedule released. Escudero was faced with high criticism due to his delaying of the impeachment of Duterte in the Senate. On May 12, 2026, the 2025 Philippine Senate election was held and senators Bong Go, Ronald dela Rosa, Pia Cayetano, Lito Lapid, and Imee Marcos were re-elected. Former senators Bam Aquino, Kiko Pangilinan, Panfilo Lacson, and Tito Sotto returned. Neophytes Erwin Tulfo, Rodante Marcoleta, and Camille Villar were elected, and senators Bong Revilla and Francis Tolentino lost re-election. Sotto revealed that at least four senators have urged him to retake the Senate presidency. Escudero said he would leave it to the senators on who to pick. Both Sotto and Escudero are members of the Nationalist People's Coalition (NPC), with Sotto as its party chairman.

For the Duterte-aligned senators, dela Rosa observed neither of them are ambitious enough to target the Senate presidency, and said "What we're after from our bloc is to simply be treated fairly and not be ignored and treated like second class citizens. We should be on equal footing with everyone." On an interview, Marcoleta did not answer the question if he is vying for the Senate presidency. Dela Rosa later said that the Duterte-aligned senators have not talked about this as Padilla is overseas. Dela Rosa pointed to Alan Peter Cayetano and Juan Miguel Zubiri as additional candidates for the Senate presidency. Go later said that both Escudero and Sotto have discussed about the Senate presidential election to them.

On May 24, Imee Marcos said that she had some senators expressing support to her if she runs for the Senate presidency. She also confirmed that she will be joining the Duterte bloc. Jinggoy Estrada, on the other hand, sees Escudero retaining the Senate presidency, and denounced rumors of him replacing Escudero as an interim Senate president on the lame-duck session, saying that "I will decline it. That is not true." Later that week, Sotto explained that the president has usually not interfered with the election of the Senate president, and that the Senate had rejected the president's preferred Senate president before. Sotto also revealed that Escudero had taken a leave of absence from the NPC. Escudero remained as Senate president during the lame-duck session, presiding over the Senate as it adjourned sine die. Alan Peter Cayetano believed that Escudero has the numbers to retain the Senate presidency in the 20th Congress. Escudero, for his part, said that while he would not campaign, he would not decline if nominated.

Upon the start of terms on June 30, Joel Villanueva said Escudero has at least 13 votes to win the Senate presidency, counting at least himself and Erwin Tulfo. Risa Hontiveros said that while she is targeting leading the minority, she acknowledged she may not have the numbers and lead an independent bloc instead. Hontiveros also said she won't join the majority bloc. For his part, Tito Sotto is open to leading the minority if he loses the Senate presidential election. Zubiri then said he will support Sotto for Senate president, while JV Ejercito said he prefers Escudero to be retained. A week later, Estrada said that a resolution supporting Escudero to be reelected to the Senate presidency has at least 13 signatures. Estrada also said that he expects Bam Aquino and Kiko Pangilinan to join the majority; Risa Hontiveros had expected them to join her at least in the independent bloc.

Dela Rosa announced that the seven pro-Duterte senators, whom he called as the "Duter7", are to support Escudero. Meanwhile, Aquino clarified that he remains with the "independent bloc", along with Hontiveros and Pangilinan. Zubiri also publicly invited Hontiveros to join the "veterans bloc" who are supporting Sotto. Lacson explained that the blocs are solely based on who a senator voted for in the Senate presidential election. Hontiveros later said she is open in joining the "veterans bloc". Zubiri then said she is "most welcome" in joining them, with Zubiri expressing pity on Hontiveros, who after campaigning for her candidates, was now alone. Dela Rosa also said that if Escudero won't run for the Senate presidency, one among the Duter7 would run instead. A week later, Estrada said that "18 are in the majority. Only six did not join". Aquino and Pangilinan faced high criticism by their supporters due to plans that they will join's Escudero's majority and leave ally Risa Hontiveros in the minority.

== Electoral system ==
The Senate president is elected by a majority vote of the members of the Senate from among themselves. Since there are 24 senators, 13 votes are needed to win the Senate presidency, including any vacant seats or senators not attending the session. Although Senate presidents are elected at the start of each Congress, there had been numerous instances of Senate leadership elections in which a sitting Senate president has been unseated in the middle of a session. Term-sharing agreements among senators who are both eyeing the position of the Senate president also played a role in changing the leadership of the Senate, but in a smooth manner, through the peaceful transition of power. Three known instances were in 1999, 2006, and 2018.

Newly elected Senate presidents are traditionally sworn in by the youngest senator, known as the "Benjamin" of the chamber, usually one belonging to the majority bloc, as in the cases of Bam Aquino administering the oath of office to Franklin Drilon in 2013, Manny Pacquiao to Koko Pimentel in 2016, Mark Villar to Francis Escudero in 2024, and Camille Villar to Alan Peter Cayetano in 2026.

Unlike the symbolic presiding officers of upper houses in some other governments, the Senate president of the Philippines has considerable power to influence the legislative agenda, and has a normal vote rather than acting only as a tie-breaker, though the tradition that the presiding officer is the last to vote has been maintained. A tied vote in the Senate therefore means that the motion is lost; the Senate president, having already voted in the normal way, cannot also cast a tie-breaking vote.

== Election ==
On July 28, 2025, the Senate in the 20th Congress was formally opened, immediately causing a leadership election. Senator Joel Villanueva proceeded to nominate Escudero for Senate president and Senators Win Gatchalian, dela Rosa, and Raffy Tulfo seconded the nomination. Senator Juan Miguel Zubiri then nominated Sotto for Senate president with Senator Loren Legarda seconding it, after which the nomination was closed.

=== Results ===
July 2025 election for president of the Senate
| Party | Nominees | Nominated By | Votes | % |
|---|---|---|---|---|
| NPC | Francis Escudero (incumbent) | Joel Villanueva | 19 | 79.17 |
| NPC | Tito Sotto | Juan Miguel Zubiri | 5 | 20.83 |
| Total votes | | | 24 | 100.00 |

Escudero proceeded to take his oath before Pia Cayetano with his wife, Heart Evangelista and their two children. Senators Jinggoy Estrada and Villanueva were then elected by acclamation as Senate president pro tempore and Senate Majority Leader respectively. Zubiri nominated Sotto again but for the position of Senate Minority Leader in which Sotto accepted.

List of senators who participated in the election
| No. | Senator | Party | Original bloc (end of 19th Congress) | Ballot vote cast | New bloc |
|---|---|---|---|---|---|
| 1 | Bam Aquino | KANP | —N/a | Escudero | Majority |
| 2 | Alan Peter Cayetano | Independent | Independent | Escudero | Majority |
| 3 | Pia Cayetano | Nacionalista | Majority | Escudero | Majority |
| 4 | Ronald dela Rosa | PDP | Majority | Escudero | Majority |
| 5 | JV Ejercito | NPC | Independent | Escudero | Majority |
| 6 | Francis Escudero | NPC | Majority | Sotto (Note: It is common tradition for senators who are nominees for the Senate presidency to vote for their opponent.) | Majority |
| 7 | Jinggoy Estrada | PMP | Majority | Escudero | Majority |
| 8 | Win Gatchalian | NPC | Independent | Escudero | Majority |
| 9 | Bong Go | PDP | Majority | Escudero | Majority |
| 10 | Risa Hontiveros | Akbayan | Minority | Sotto | Minority |
| 11 | Panfilo Lacson | Independent | —N/a | Sotto | Minority |
| 12 | Lito Lapid | NPC | Majority | Escudero | Majority |
| 13 | Loren Legarda | NPC | Independent | Sotto | Minority |
| 14 | Rodante Marcoleta | Independent | —N/a | Escudero | Majority |
| 15 | Imee Marcos | Nacionalista | Majority | Escudero | Majority |
| 16 | Robin Padilla | PDP | Majority | Escudero | Majority |
| 17 | Kiko Pangilinan | Liberal | —N/a | Escudero | Majority |
| 18 | Tito Sotto | NPC | —N/a | Escudero | Minority |
| 19 | Erwin Tulfo | Lakas | —N/a | Escudero | Majority |
| 20 | Raffy Tulfo | Independent | Majority | Escudero | Majority |
| 21 | Joel Villanueva | Independent | Independent | Escudero | Majority |
| 22 | Camille Villar | Nacionalista | —N/a | Escudero | Majority |
| 23 | Mark Villar | Nacionalista | Majority | Escudero | Majority |
| 24 | Juan Miguel Zubiri | Independent | Independent | Sotto | Minority |
