= María del Carmen Escudero =

Mexican politician

- Born: 25 July 1969 (age 56); Orizaba, Veracruz, Mexico
- Occupation: Politician
- Political party: PAN

María del Carmen Escudero Fabre (born 25 July 1969) is a Mexican politician affiliated with the National Action Party. As of 2014, she served as Deputy of the LIX Legislature of the Mexican Congress as a plurinominal representative.
