= Richard Stanbury (diplomat) =

Personal information
- Full name: Richard Vivian Macaulay Stanbury
- Born: 5 February 1916; Madras (now Chennai), India
- Died: 29 June 2008 (aged 92); East Sussex, England
- Batting: Right-handed

Domestic team information
- Years: Team
- 1935–1936: Somerset

Career statistics
Competition	FC
Matches	2
Runs scored	31
Batting average	10.33
100s/50s	0/0
Top score	21
Catches/stumpings	2/–
- Source: CricketArchive, 22 December 2015

Richard Vivian Macaulay Stanbury (5 February 1916 – 29 June 2008) was a career diplomat whose colourful life included playing first-class cricket for Somerset in two matches, one in each of the 1935 and 1936 seasons. He was born at Madras, now known as Chennai, India and died in East Sussex, England.

Educated at Shrewsbury School, Stanbury was an undergraduate at Magdalene College, Cambridge when selected for his first match for Somerset against Cambridge University. A right-handed lower order batsman and wicketkeeper, he took two catches (Paul Gibb in both Cambridge innings) and scored 6 and 21. The following year he played in a single match against Essex without success.

He graduated from Cambridge in 1937 with a first-class honours degree in Classics, and joined the Sudan Political Service, the colonial administration in Sudan that oversaw local government: he was a district commissioner there for 13 years. Invalided out of Sudan in 1950, he was posted to Cairo in the transition to the Egyptian republic, where his fluency in Arabic and use of appropriate expletives saved him from lynching at the hands of a mob. He also played cricket for the Gezira Cricket Club and top-scored with 13 when a 15-strong team played against the Pakistani cricket team on its way to England for its first tour in 1954. He was later posted to Bahrain and his final diplomatic post was in the British embassy in Buenos Aires, where one of his roles was to liaise with other Latin American countries over the UK's attitude towards the Peronist government of Argentina.

Stanbury retired from the UK diplomatic service to become a fruit farmer in Portugal in the 1970s, and retired from that to East Sussex where he and his wife ran a business that imported Portuguese pottery.

He met his wife, Geraldine, in Cairo; they married in 1953. At the time of his death in 2008, he had a daughter, a son, and five grandchildren.
