= Esteban Escudero =

Spanish Roman Catholic bishop (1946–2025)

His Excellency Esteban Escudero Torres
- Auxiliary Bishop Emeritus of Valencia; Titular Bishop of Diano
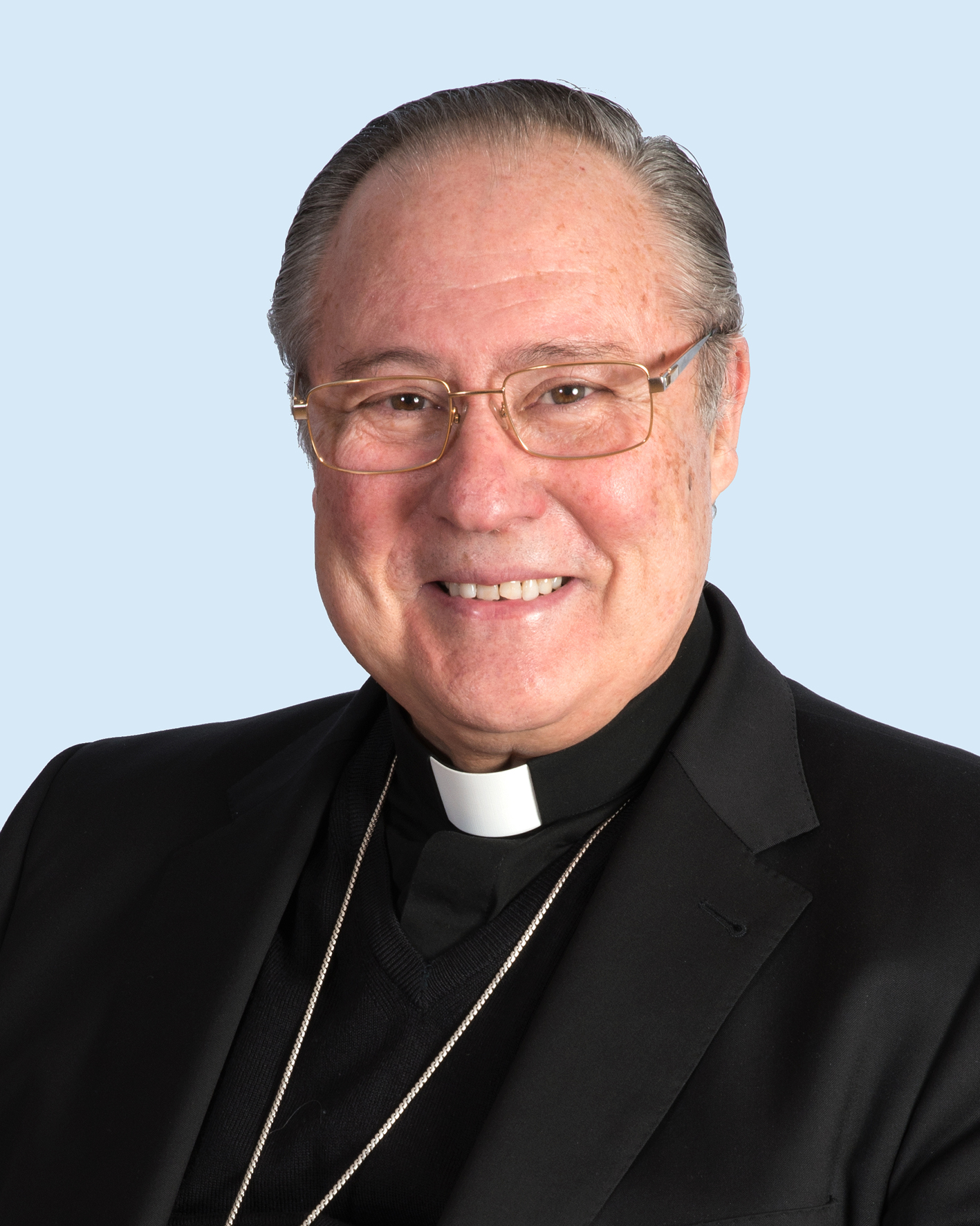
- Archdiocese: Valencia
- Appointed: 17 November 2000
- Term ended: 1 March 2021
- Other post: Titular Bishop of Diano (2015–2025)
- Previous posts: Titular Bishop of Thala (2000–2010); Bishop of Palencia (2010–2015)

Orders
- Ordination: 12 January 1975
- Consecration: 13 January 2001 by Agustín García-Gasco Vicente

Personal details
- Born: 4 February 1946 Valencia, Spain
- Died: 2 May 2025 (aged 79) Valencia, Spain
- Motto: Domine, ad quem ibimus
- Coat of arms

Styles of Esteban Escudero Torres
- Reference style: His Excellency; The Most Reverend
- Spoken style: Your Excellency
- Religious style: Bishop

Esteban Escudero Torres (4 February 1946 – 2 May 2025) was a Spanish Roman Catholic prelate and theologian. He was bishop of Palencia from 2010 to 2015 and auxiliary bishop of Valencia twice from 2000 to 2010 and from 2015 to 2021. Escudero died in Valencia on 2 May 2025 at the age of 79.

Catholic Church titles
Preceded by —	Auxiliary Bishop of Valencia; 2000–2010, 2015–2021	Succeeded by —
Preceded by Michael Pearse Lacey	Titular Bishop of Diano; 2015–2025	Succeeded by Vacant
Preceded by José Ignacio Munilla Aguirre	Bishop of Palencia; 2010–2015	Succeeded by Manuel Herrero Fernández
Preceded by Michael Dallat	Titular Bishop of Thala; 2000–2010	Succeeded by Vincent Long Van Nguyen
