= Jorge Stanbury Escudero =

Jorge Stanbury Escudero, better known by his stage name Jorge Escudero, was a Peruvian-born Venezuelan singer and composer of popular tango music in the 1950s, who has been called "The successor to Gardel."

Escudero was the son of Jorge Stanbury and Rosa Escudero. His nephew Carlos Stanbury and niece Jennifer Stanbury are also singers and composers.

In addition to a number of original compositions, including "el Vals Peruano," "el Triste," "el Yaraví", and "el Tango," Stanbury also invented, and in some cases patented, industrial equipment like truck lights and an illuminated taxi.
