= Francisco Escudero Casquino =

Peruvian politician

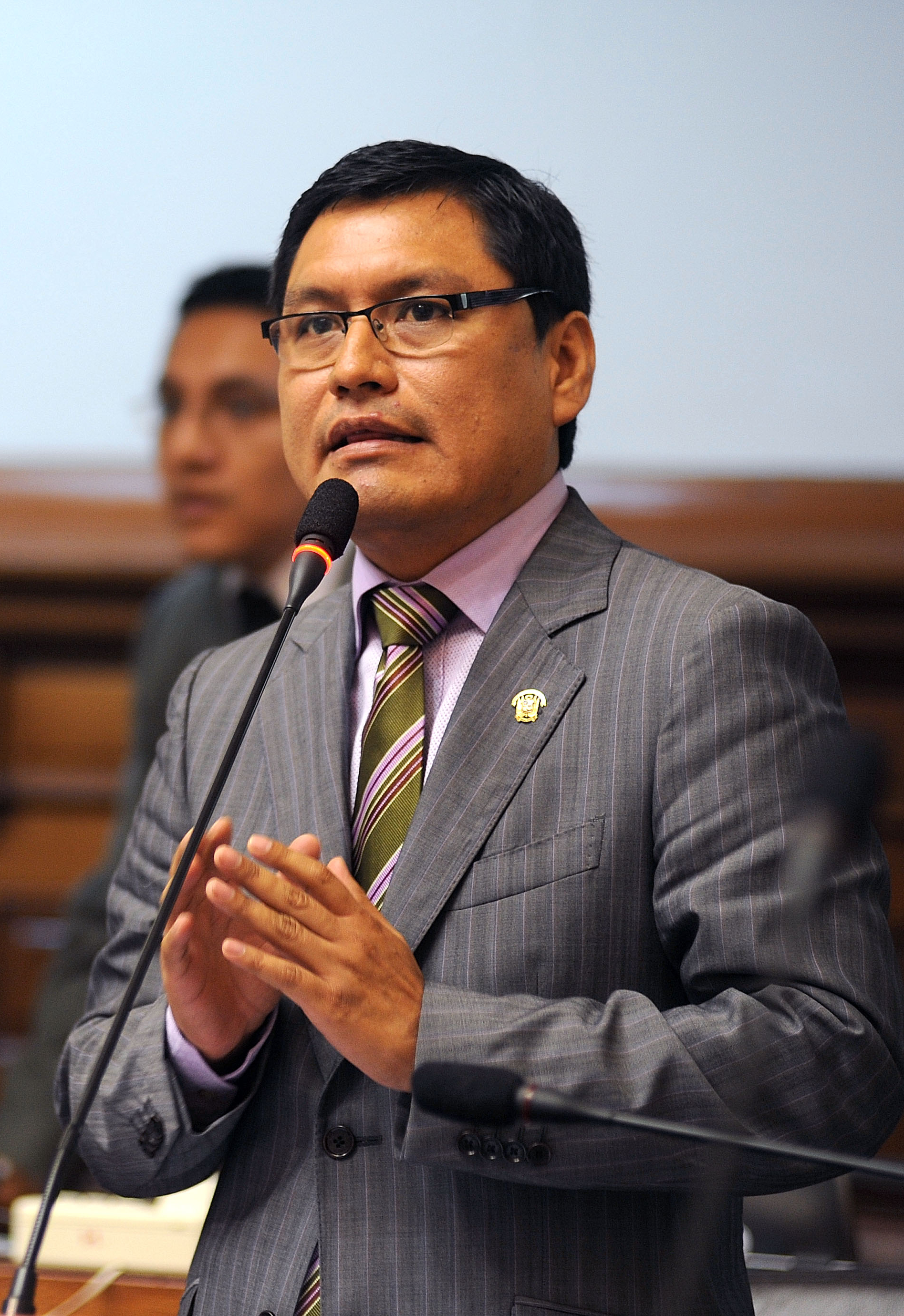
- Former Congressman Escudero in 2010

Member of Congress
- In office 26 July 2006 – 26 July 2011
- Constituency: La Libertad

Personal details
- Born: Francisco Alberto Escudero Casquino; 9 July 1966 (age 59)
- Party: Union for Peru
- Occupation: Politician

Francisco Alberto Escudero Casquino (born 9 July 1966) is a Peruvian politician and a former Congressman representing La Libertad for the 2006–2011 term. Escudero belongs to the Union for Peru party. He failed to attain re-election in the 2011 elections when he ran for re-election under the National Solidarity Alliance of Luis Castañeda, but he attained a low share of votes and was not returned to Congress.
