= Francis Escudero =

President of the Senate of the Philippines from 2024 to 2025

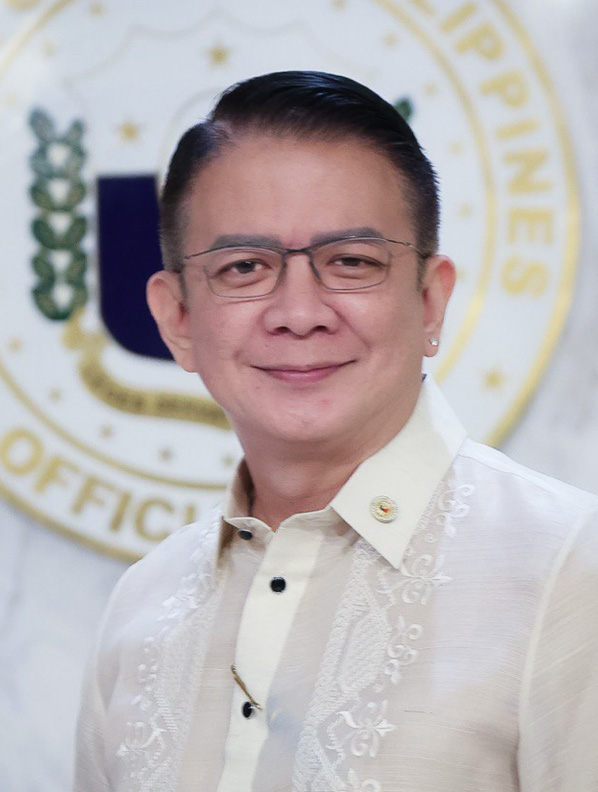
- Official portrait, 2025

31st President of the Senate of the Philippines
- In office May 20, 2024 – September 8, 2025
- Preceded by: Juan Miguel Zubiri
- Succeeded by: Tito Sotto

Senator of the Philippines
- Incumbent
- Assumed office June 30, 2022
- In office June 30, 2007 – June 30, 2019
Committee positions
Chair of the Senate Higher, Technical and Vocational Education Committee
In office June 30, 2022 – May 22, 2024
| Preceded by | Joel Villanueva |
| Succeeded by | Alan Peter Cayetano |
Chair of the Senate Education, Arts and Culture Committee
In office February 27, 2017 – June 30, 2019
| Preceded by | Bam Aquino |
| Succeeded by | Win Gatchalian (as Chair of the Senate Basic Education, Arts and Culture) |
Chair of the Senate Banks, Financial Institutions and Currencies Committee
In office July 25, 2016 – June 30, 2019
| Preceded by | Serge Osmeña |
| Succeeded by | Grace Poe |
Chair of the Senate Finance Committee
In office July 22, 2013 – July 28, 2015
| Preceded by | Franklin Drilon |
| Succeeded by | Loren Legarda |
Chair of the Senate National Defense and Security Committee
In office July 26, 2010 – July 22, 2013
| Preceded by | Rodolfo Biazon |
| Succeeded by | Antonio Trillanes |
Chair of the Senate Justice and Human Rights Committee
In office July 23, 2007 – July 22, 2013
| Preceded by | Juan Ponce Enrile |
| Succeeded by | Koko Pimentel |

House Minority Leader
- In office July 26, 2004 – June 30, 2007
- Preceded by: Carlos M. Padilla
- Succeeded by: Ronaldo Zamora

Member of the Philippine House of Representatives from Sorsogon's 1st district
- In office June 30, 1998 – June 30, 2007
- Preceded by: Salvador Escudero
- Succeeded by: Salvador Escudero

23rd Governor of Sorsogon
- In office June 30, 2019 – June 30, 2022
- Vice Governor: Wowo Fortes
- Preceded by: Robert Lee Rodrigueza
- Succeeded by: Jose Edwin Hamor

Personal details
- Born: Francis Joseph Guevara Escudero; October 10, 1969 (age 56) Manila, Philippines
- Party: NPC (1998–2009; 2018–present)
- Other political affiliations: Independent (2009–2018); LAMMP (1998–2001)
- Spouses: Christine Flores (m. 2005; ann. 2011) Heart Evangelista (m. 2015)
- Relations: Dette Escudero (sister); Martin Escudero (nephew)
- Children: 2
- Parents: Salvador Escudero (father); Evelina Escudero (mother)
- Education: University of the Philippines Diliman (BA, LL.B); Georgetown University (LL.M)
- Website: Official website

Francis Joseph "Chiz" Guevara Escudero (Tagalog pronunciation: [ɛskʊˈdero], born October 10, 1969) is a Filipino politician and lawyer who has served as a senator of the Philippines since 2022 and previously from 2007 to 2019. A member of the Nationalist People's Coalition, he served as the 31st president of the Senate of the Philippines from 2024 to 2025. He unsuccessfully ran for vice president of the Philippines in the 2016 elections as the running mate of Grace Poe.

Born to a political family based in Sorsogon, Escudero was educated at the University of the Philippines. He entered politics in 1998 after being elected as the representative for Sorsogon's first district, a seat he would hold until 2007. During his tenure, he served as the spokesperson for the unsuccessful 2004 presidential campaign of Fernando Poe Jr. In the aftermath of the ensuing Hello Garci scandal, he supported the efforts to impeach President Gloria Macapagal Arroyo.

Escudero was elected to the Senate in the 2007 election. As a senator, he was cited as a possible presidential candidate in the 2010 election. After declining a run for higher office, he endorsed the split-ticket "NoyBi" tandem, which would win the election. In 2016, he ran for vice president and lost to Leni Robredo. He was reelected to the Senate in the 2013 election, leaving office in 2019. He then served as the 23rd governor of Sorsogon from 2019 to 2022.

Escudero returned to the upper chamber after being elected in the 2022 election. In 2024, he was elected to the Senate presidency after a successful effort to oust his predecessor Juan Miguel Zubiri from the office. His leadership of the Senate was marked by his handling of the impeachment of Sara Duterte, which received a mixed reception. In September 2025, he was ousted as president of the Senate of the Philippines, and replaced by Senator Tito Sotto, amid corruption allegations surrounding government flood control projects.

Escudero denied Bernardo's allegations, calling them "malicious allegations and innuendos" and saying that Bernardo had admitted he had no direct contact with him regarding the alleged transactions.

In April 2026, Ombudsman Jesus Crispin Remulla said that his office was preparing possible plunder charges against Escudero and former House speaker Martin Romualdez in connection with the flood control scandal. Escudero and Romualdez denied involvement in anomalous flood control projects. In May 2026, Senator Panfilo Lacson sought a preliminary investigation of Escudero, Romualdez and other officials in relation to the flood control probe.

== Early life ==
Francis Joseph Guevara Escudero was born on October 10, 1969, in Manila, the second of three children of Salvador "Sonny" Escudero III and Evelina B. Guevara-Escudero. Salvador was the director of University of the Philippines Veterinary Hospital at the time of Francis's birth and would later serve as Minister of Agriculture and Food during the Marcos era, and representative of Sorsogon's first district twice. Evelina also served as representative of the district. His younger sister Dette has been the representative of the same district since 2022. Escudero's grandfather, Salvador Escudero Jr., was mayor of Casiguran, Sorsogon, and a member of the Sorsogon Provincial Board. Escudero's grand-grandfather, Salvador "Gurang" Escudero Sr., a Spanish Mestizo, entered politics in 1912 as councilor of Casiguran and went on to become mayor, provincial board member, and governor of Sorsogon. When the Japanese occupation broke out in 1942, he led one of the three guerilla units of the province.

== Education ==
Escudero was educated at the University of the Philippines (UP). He attended the University of the Philippines Integrated School for elementary (1981) and high school (1985). He then earned his bachelor's degree in political science from the University of the Philippines Diliman (1989) and Bachelor of Laws from the University of the Philippines College of Law (1993).

At UP, Escudero joined the Alpha Phi Beta fraternity and was a member of its debating team, which was the 1991 UP Open Debate Champion. A consistent honor student, Escudero was a member of the Order of the Purple Feather or the UP Law Honor Society (1989-1993). He became the Secretary General of the Association of Law Students of the Philippines on his senior year at law school (1992-1993).

== Early career ==
Escudero's involvement in politics started in the 1980s as an organizer for the local campaign of his father. He first expressed interest in running for public office as municipal councilor of Sorsogon when he was 22. At 25, he again indicated his intention to run, this time as mayor of the municipality. However, on both occasions, his family forbade him from entering politics and insisted that he finish his law studies before embarking on a political career.

Before becoming a lawyer, Escudero was a teaching assistant at the UP Department of Political Science (1988–1989). In 1989, he became a Junior Political Analyst of the Batangas Development Planning office.

After he received his law degree, Escudero joined the Bautista, Picazo, Buyco, Tan and Fider Law Office in 1993 as junior associate. A year later, he became a legal consultant of the UNLAD Ship Management and Manning Corp. and legal counsel of the Crusade Against Violence (CAV). By 1995, he was a partner at his own firm, the Escudero, Marasigan, Sta. Ana, Vallente and Villareal Law Office (EMSAVIL Law). He remains with the firm to this day.

In 1996, Escudero received his master's degree in International and Comparative Law at the Georgetown University Law Center in Washington, D.C.

Aside from pursuing his law practice, Escudero was senior lecturer at the University of the Philippines College of Law (1996-1998). He also taught at the graduate school of the Ateneo de Manila University in 2000.

On July 3, 2000, Escudero was named a Commander of the Philippine Navy Reserve Command.

While serving as a lawmaker, Escudero also dabbled in media. From May to August 2000, he hosted "Ngayon na Pinoy", a TV program on RPN. He also anchored the radio programs "Magandang Umaga Bayan" on the Angel Radio, DZAR 1026 AM; and "Usapang de Campanilla" and "Usapang Legal", both on DZMM.

Escudero also penned a column, "Usapang Legal ni Chiz Escudero" (later renamed "Say Chiz") in two tabloids: Abante and Abante Tonite.

== House of Representatives (1998–2007) ==
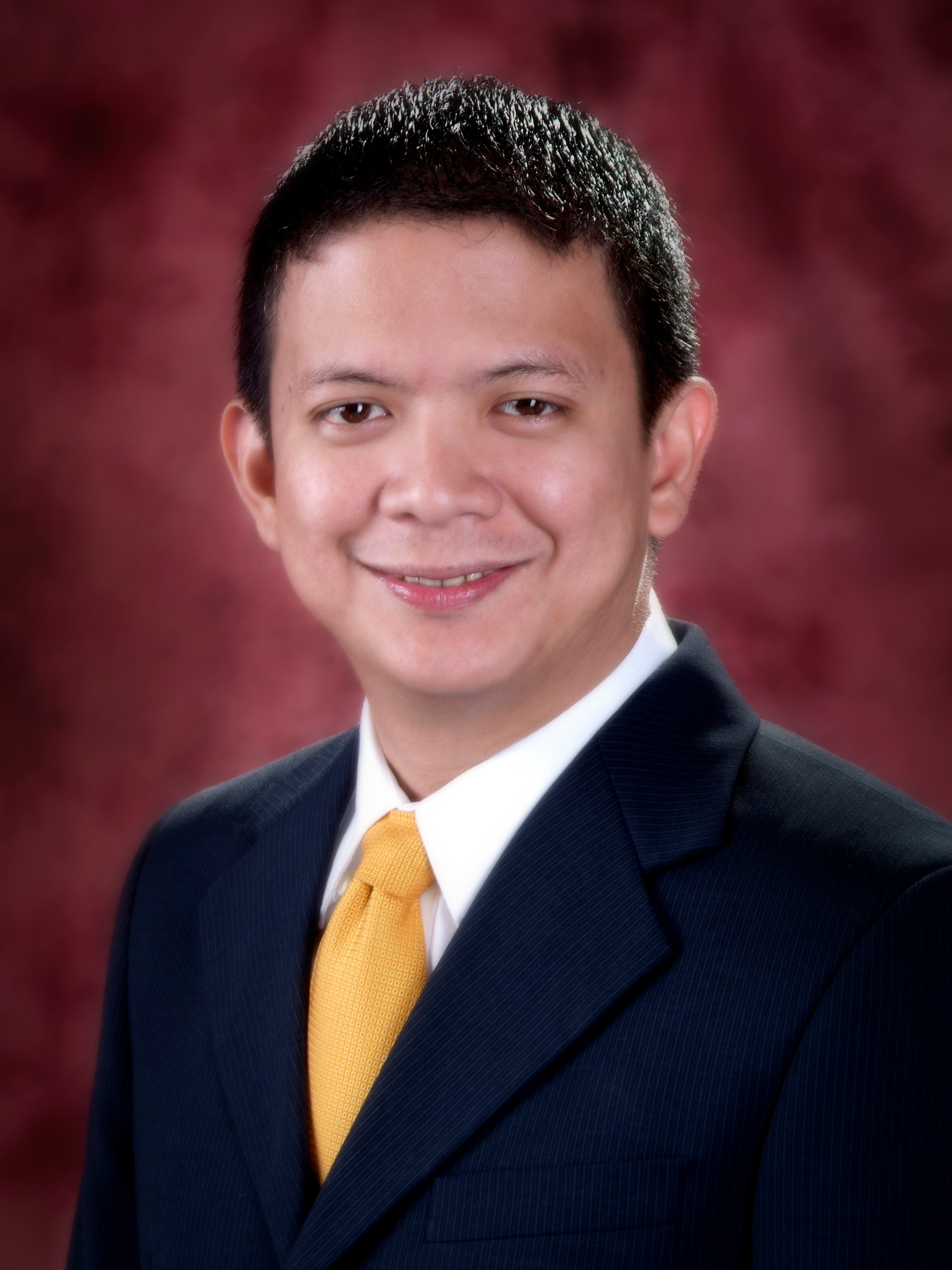
Representative Escudero in 2007

Escudero was 28 when he began his political career. He was elected representative of the first district of Sorsogon in 1998 and was one of the youngest lawmakers in the 11th Congress. Escudero was a member of the Nationalist People's Coalition, the second biggest political party in the Philippines that time, from 1998 to 2009.

He was elected Assistant Majority Floor Leader of the 11th Congress from June 1998 to November 2000 and became Second Deputy Majority Floor Leader from November 2000 to January 2001. He was Assistant Deputy Majority of the 11th Congress from January to June 2001. In his last term as member of the House of Representatives, he served as Minority Floor Leader from 2004 to 2007. While in Congress, Escudero pushed for the cityhood of Sorsogon. On August 16, 2000, Republic Act 8806 was passed, merging the municipalities of Sorsogon and Bacon into a component city of Sorsogon province. The law was ratified during a plebiscite on December 16, 2000, and Sorsogon functioned as a city on June 30, 2001, with the assumption into office of its first officials.

In 2004, Escudero figured prominently in the Philippine presidential elections as the campaign spokesperson of presidential candidate Fernando Poe Jr., a popular movie actor. Poe eventually lost to the incumbent president Gloria Macapagal Arroyo in a highly contested electoral exercise. When evidence of alleged electoral fraud surfaced, Escudero was among the lawmakers who moved for the impeachment of then President Arroyo. However, the President's allies in Congress voted to drop the impeachment complaint. On September 6, 2005, Escudero voted no on the dropping of impeachment complaints against President Arroyo. He explained, "It is the truth that has lost. But the search for the truth does not end today. The president and her allies will always be haunted by questions." A new impeachment case was filed on 2006 and Escudero maintained his vote against its dismissal. Despite another round of defeat, Escudero said the results "will not change the fact that there was cheating, lying, anomalies and stealing in government."

Escudero belonged to the anti-charter change bloc who voted against the constitutional reform initiatives of then-House Speaker Jose de Venecia Jr. He believed these attempts to change the Constitution are nothing but last ditch efforts to keep the president and his allies in power.

Escudero was a member of a group of NGO-legislators proposing an alternative national budget called "Imperatives of Real and Equitable Growth: An Alternative Proposal for Financing the Millennium Development Goals in the 2007 Budget". This is in response to the proposed national budget of the administration for not being perceptive to the social development needs of the Philippines.

== Senate (2007–2019) ==
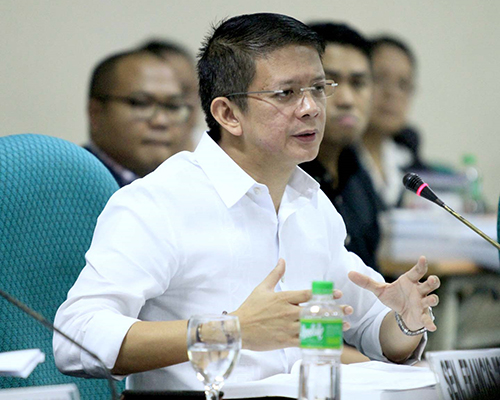
Senator Escudero during a session with the Philippine Senate, September 24, 2014

On January 30, 2007, Escudero filed his candidacy for the Senate of the Philippines, becoming the first opposition lawmaker to do so. He was elected to the Senate with the second highest tally of votes, slightly behind Loren Legarda.

In the 14th Congress of the Philippines, Escudero chaired the Senate Committees on Justice and Human Rights; Ways and Means; and National Defense. In the 15th Congress, he headed the Senate Committee on Justice and Human Rights and the Committee on Environment and Natural Resources. He also led the Joint Oversight Committees on Ecological Solid Waste Management and the Joint Congressional Oversight Committee on the Clean Air Act.

On October 29, 2009, Escudero announced his resignation from the Nationalist People's Coalition and became an independent. Escudero was expected to run for the presidency but he did not. Instead, he endorsed the team-up of Senator Benigno Aquino III and Makati Mayor Jejomar Binay, which became dubbed as "NoyBi". The two political figures, who belong to opposing camps, won as President and Vice President, respectively.

On October 2, 2012, Escudero filed for reelection. Prior to the official campaign period, Escudero, Legarda, and Grace Poe were expected to run as common candidates of both the administration and opposition slates. However, the opposition group United Nationalist Alliance junked the three Senate bets. Escudero remained independent but ran as part of the administration-backed coalition Team PNoy. Garnering 17,502,358 votes out of 40,214,324 registered voters who actually voted, he won another term as senator.

During the initial announcement of Senate chairmanships in the 16th Congress, Escudero got the Education Committee but ended up as chairman of the powerful Finance Committee. Majority Floor Leader Alan Cayetano explained, "Because there was no decision yet on who will be the chairperson of the Committee on Finance, and since it’s one of the biggest committees or one with the largest jurisdiction, traditionally the chairman of the Committee on Finance would not have any other committee. So Senator Escudero graciously gave up the chairmanship of the committee on education because he took over the Committee on Finance."

== 2016 vice presidential bid ==
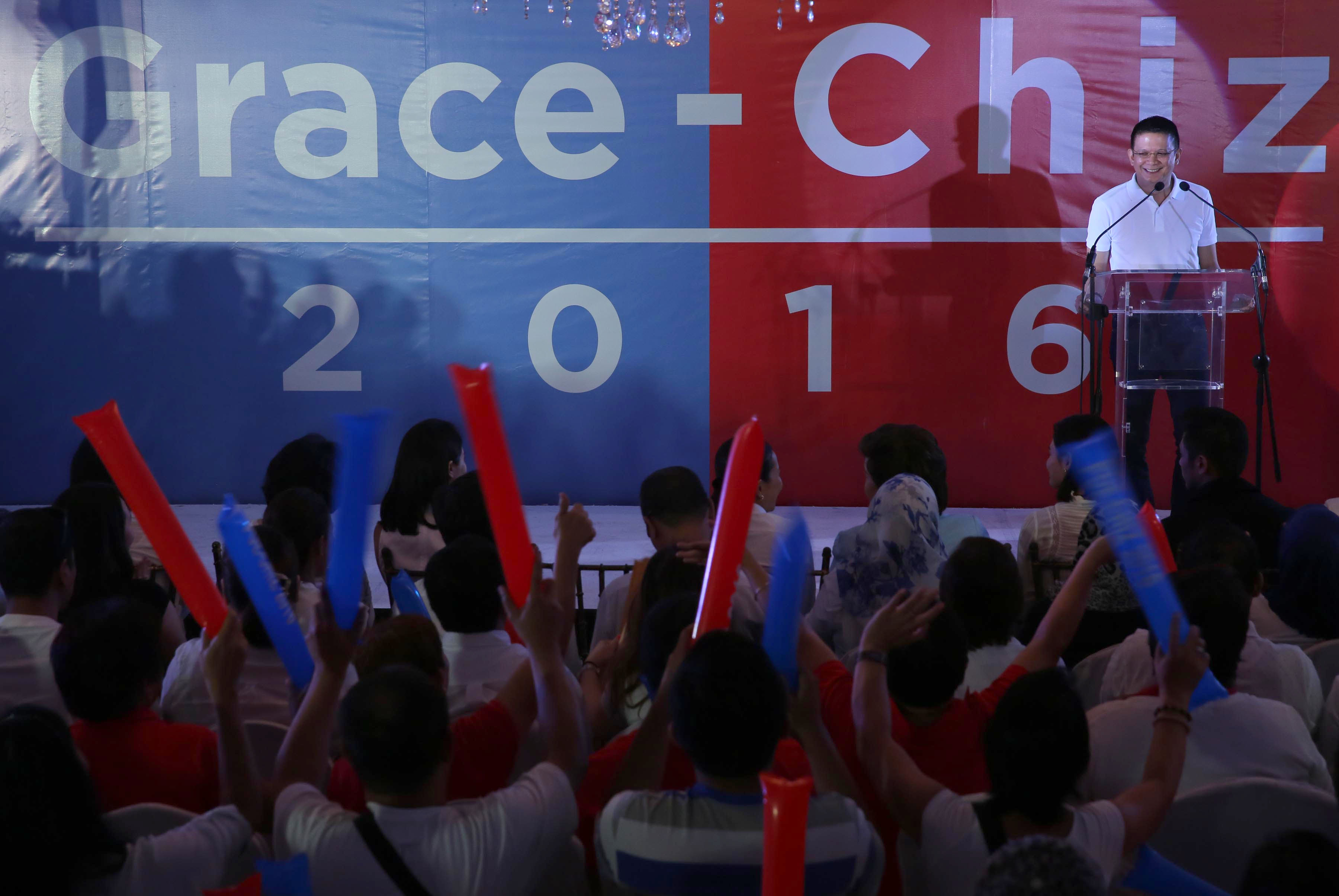
Chiz Escudero declares his vice presidential bid, September 18, 2015

Citing a possible bid for higher office in the next elections, Escudero resigned as chairman of the Senate Committee on Finance and as co-chair of the Joint Congressional Committee on Public Expenditures on July 28, 2015. In his letter to Senate President Franklin Drilon, Escudero wrote, "However, given my public pronouncements regarding a possible candidacy for higher office in 2016, I believe that it behooves me to step down at this juncture to ensure that deliberations on the General Appropriations Bill (GAB) – considered the single most important piece of legislation passed by Congress each year – are untainted by suspicions or perceptions of partisan politics."

Long rumored as the possible running mate of leading presidential candidate Grace Poe, Escudero officially announced his candidacy for vice president of the Philippines on September 15, 2015, at the historic Club Filipino. In her introduction, Poe enumerated the accomplishments of Escudero as a legislator both in the House and the Senate. said, "It's true Senator Chiz is my friend, but for the nation, my reason for teaming up with him is personal trust. He is a person who can be trusted, a person who has experience and a person who has already done something for the people."

Presidential frontrunner and Davao City mayor Rodrigo Duterte called the combination of Poe and Escudero as an "excellent" tandem because of his political experience and her ability to provide ascendancy.

A day after his declaration, the Nationalist People's Coalition (NPC) administered the oath-taking of 200 officials from Batangas, Laguna, and Quezon as members in part because of support for the Poe-Escudero ticket. Talks are rife the NPC, in coalition with other political parties including the Nacionalista Party, the National Unity Party, and the Makabayan bloc, will back the Poe-Escudero tandem in the coming elections. Former Philippine Charity Sweepstakes Office board member Florencio Noel revealed, at least eight party-list groups have also expressed support for Poe and Escudero.

In late 2015, Escudero began leading the vice presidential opinion polls, and by February 2016 started being statistically tied with Senator Bongbong Marcos several times, before being beaten by Marcos by early April. Escudero continued to drop in April, maintaining third place behind Marcos and Representative Leni Robredo. A day after the election, on May 10, 2016, Escudero conceded the race, garnering 4.9 million votes and placing fourth among six candidates with 12% of the votes in the unofficial COMELEC transparency server count, behind Robredo, Marcos and Senator Alan Peter Cayetano.

== Governor of Sorsogon (2019–2022) ==
Escudero was elected governor of Sorsogon and executed his duties for one term from June 30, 2019 to June 30, 2022.

== Return to the Senate (2022–present) ==
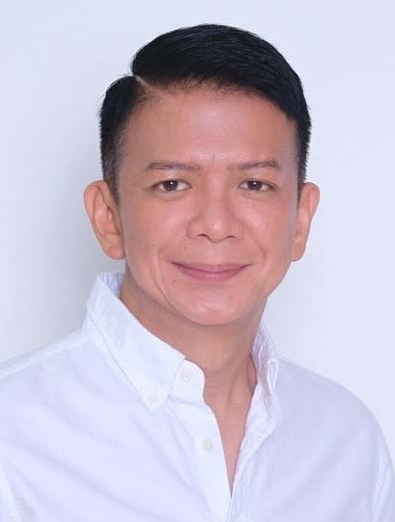
Official portrait, 2022

In the run up to the 2022 Philippine general election, Escudero was endorsed by the outgoing President Rodrigo Duterte and campaigned for the empowerment of local government units. Escudero was once again elected, finishing fifth with over 20 million votes. After a vehicle bearing the protocol license plate assigned to Escudero trespassed along the bus-exclusive EDSA busway, Escudero apologized and stated that the usage of the vehicle was unauthorized and driven by the driver of a family member. Private vehicles are not authorized to drive along the busway, and the incident was seen as part of the larger trend of vehicles with government issued license place trespassing along the busway.

=== President of the Senate (2024–2025) ===
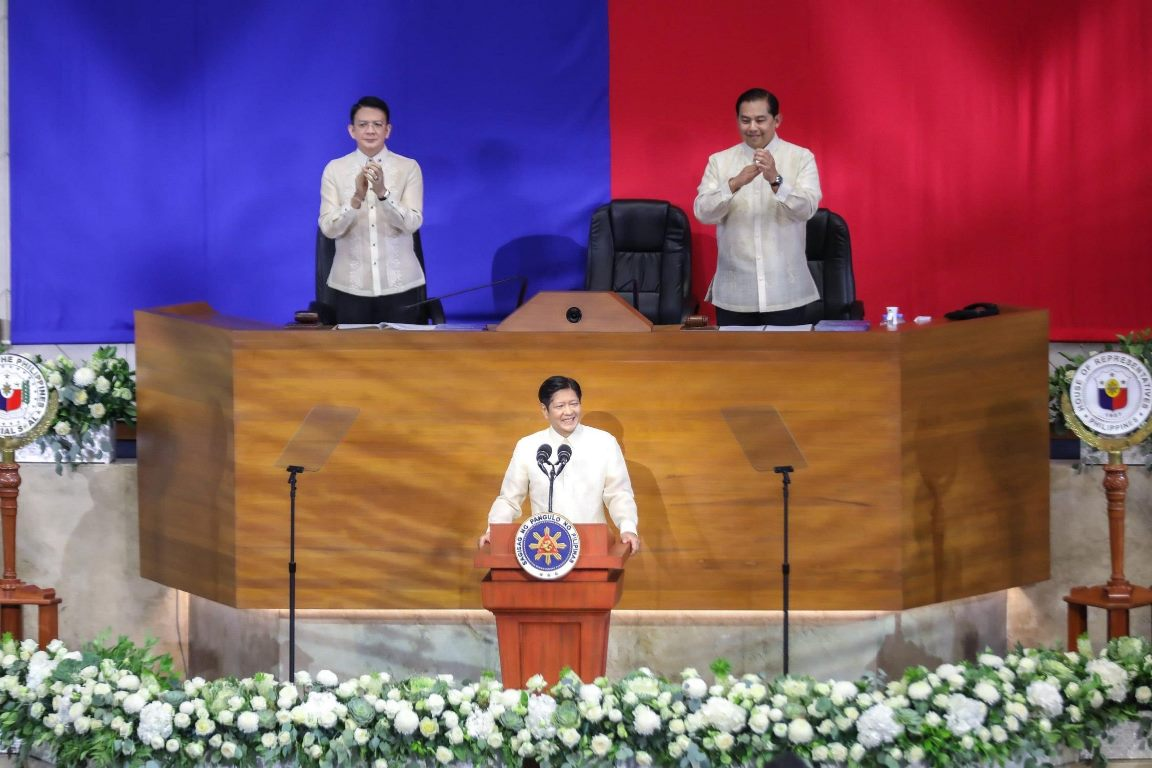
Escudero (left) during President Bongbong Marcos's 2024 State of the Nation Address

Escudero won a closed-ballot vote to become the 31st president of the Senate of the Philippines. Escudero replaced outgoing Senate President Juan Miguel Zubiri on May 20, 2024. He was sworn-in by Senator Mark Villar and was accompanied by his wife Heart Evangelista. In his first acts as President of the Senate he oversaw the nomination and subsequent election of several of his colleagues to certain senate positions and committees, notably Senator Jinggoy Estrada having been sworn-in as the President pro tempore of the Senate, replacing Senator Loren Legarda. On May 21, President Bongbong Marcos endorsed Escudero's senate presidency.

Escudero maintained that the Senate cannot convene into a impeachment court during break after the impeachment of Sara Duterte on February 5, 2025, shortly before the Congress ended their regular session. There was dissenting opinion that the Senate must convene since the 1987 Constitution obliged that the process be "shall forthwith proceed". He resisted pressure to hold to trial as soon as possible and insisted it will only be held in June 2025.

Escudero then took oath as presiding officer the Senate acting as impeachment court on June 9, 2025. He oversaw the complaint's remand back to the House of Representatives.

Escudero was re-elected as President of the Senate for the 20th Congress of the Philippines. The Supreme Court then ruled that the impeachment complaint was unconstitutional and was not compliant with the one-year rule. This prompted the Senate under Escudero to archive the complaint despite the House having filed a pending motion for reconsideration. Escudero rebuked the House, insisting that the Senate is not a "playground" to go after political opponents.

On August 11, 2025, Rappler reported that Lawrence R. Lubiano, the president of Centerways Construction, was Escudero's top donor for his campaign in the 2022 Senate election. Centerways is among the top 15 earning firms involved in flood control as revealed by President Bongbong Marcos in the 2025 State of the Nation Address when he raised the possibility that there might be irregularities' in the government's flood control efforts. Escudero, while admitting Lubiano is a friend, alleged that the report is part of a demolition job against him by those who wanted Duterte to be removed from office. He added that he did not help Lubiano after he got elected as Senator and that he has no relations to Centerways' business dealings.

On September 8, 2025, Escudero was ousted as president of the Senate of the Philippines, and replaced by Senator Tito Sotto. According to a reliable source in the Senate, Escudero lost his post due to several issues used against him such as the impeachment of Vice President Sara Duterte, the corruption allegations surrounding the government’s flood control projects, and charter change.

At a Senate hearing on corruption on September 25, 2025, former DPWH undersecretary Roberto Bernardo testified that Escudero was involved in anomalous flood control projects, alleging that Escudero got a ₱160-million kickback, or 20% of the total project cost of ₱800 million.

== Political views ==
=== South China Sea dispute ===
In response to water cannon attacks by Chinese vessels against Philippine vessels, Escudero proposed the usage of at least 100 million pesos for the construction of permanent structures housing soldiers and fishermen on Second Thomas Shoal, in the South China Sea. He has also previously advocated for the construction of permanent structures during his previous tenure as Governor of Sorsogon after similar water cannon attacks.

=== Diplomatic relations with China ===
Escudero spoke out against the statement issued by Senator Francis Tolentino, the Vice chair of the Senate Committee on Foreign Relations, to recall the Philippine Ambassador to China, Jaime FlorCruz, in response to water cannon attacks by Chinese vessels, arguing that such action would escalate the South China Sea conflict.

=== Department of Disaster Resilience ===
Responding to the 2022 Luzon Earthquake, Escudero proposed the creation of an agency focusing on disaster resilience and response to coordinate the delivery of air and distribution of funds in response to calamities. Escudero highlighted the struggles he faced as Governor of Sorsogon surrounding the distribution of aid in response to calamities which was impeded by existing bureaucracy and red-tape.

== Personal life ==
Escudero married Christine Elizabeth Flores, who is a singer and stage actress, in 1999. They have two children, fraternal twins, Quino and Chesi, born September 7, 2007. They separated after ten years of marriage and were granted a civil annulment in 2011. Escudero has custody of their two children.

In 2012, the senator began dating local actress and TV talk show host Heart Evangelista. Their engagement was announced in August 2014, a few months after Escudero obtained Church annulment of his first marriage. On February 15, 2015, Evangelista and Escudero married on Balesin Island, off the coast of Polillo, Quezon.

In May 2018, Evangelista announced that she and Escudero were expecting their first child together. In the same month, however, one of the twins she was carrying was lost to a miscarriage. In June 2018, Evangelista announced that she suffered yet another miscarriage, losing the last of her twins.

While protesting against the presidency of Arroyo, Escudero was chanted as "Bamboo" by other protesters due to some facial similarities to Bamboo, a Filipino singer and former vocalist of Rivermaya. Because of facial similarities, many memes were created about it. The two finally met in 2022 and netizens made fun of it.

On their ninth wedding anniversary on February 15, 2024, Escudero and Evangelista renewed their vows at Balesin Royal Villa, also in Balesin Island.

Escudero is a fan of actor Fernando Poe Jr., having claimed in 2004 to have watched nearly every film starring Poe.

== Awards ==
In 1999, Escudero was awarded Youth Achiever in Government; in 2000, Most Outstanding Congressman and Outstanding Public Servant of the Year; and in 2005, he was one of Ten Outstanding Young Men (TOYM) of the Philippines awardees in recognition of his youth leadership.

In 2007, Escudero was the only Filipino named as Asia's News Network's Asia's Idols. In 2008, he was given the Anak TV Seal as the Most Admired TV Personality. He was also honored by the World Economic Forum as a Young Global Leader in the same year in recognition of his professional accomplishments, commitment to society and potential to contribute to shaping the future of the world.

Escudero received the Rotary Golden Wheel Award for Political Governance and Legislation in 2012.

== Books ==
- Orteza, Bibeth. (2009). Say ni Chiz (Autobiography of Senator Francis Escudero). ICatcher Productions, Inc. ISBN 978-971-94579-1-6

== Electoral history ==
Electoral history of Francis Escudero
| Year | Office | Party | Votes received | | | | Result |
| Year | Office | Party | Total | % | P. | Swing | Result |
|---|---|---|---|---|---|---|---|
| 1998 | Representative (Sorsogon–1st) | NPC | 57,121 | 55.59% | 1st | —N/a | Won |
| 2001 | Representative (Sorsogon–1st) | NPC | —N/a | —N/a | 1st | —N/a | Won |
| 2004 | Representative (Sorsogon–1st) | NPC | —N/a | —N/a | 1st | —N/a | Won |
| 2007 | Senator of the Philippines | NPC | 18,265,307 | 61.92% | 2nd | —N/a | Won |
| 2013 | Senator of the Philippines | Independent | 17,502,358 | 43.60% | 4th | −18.32 | Won |
| 2022 | Senator of the Philippines | NPC | 20,271,458 | 36.49% | 5th | −7.11 | Won |
| 2016 | Vice President of the Philippines | Independent | 4,931,962 | 12.01% | 4th | —N/a | Lost |
| 2019 | Governor of Sorsogon | NPC | 303,960 | 87.56% | 1st | —N/a | Won |

House of Representatives of the Philippines
| Preceded by Salvador Escudero | Member of the Philippine House of Representatives from Sorsogon's 1st district 1998–2007 | Succeeded by Salvador Escudero |
| Preceded by Carlos M. Padilla | Minority Floor Leader of the House of Representatives of the Philippines; 2004–2007 | Succeeded by Ronaldo Zamora |
Senate of the Philippines
| Preceded by Juan Ponce Enrile | Chair of the Philippine Senate; Justice and Human Rights Committee; 2007–2013 | Succeeded by Aquilino Pimentel III |
| Preceded by Rodolfo Biazon | Chair of the Philippine Senate; National Defense and Security Committee; 2010–2013 | Succeeded by Antonio Trillanes |
| Preceded by Franklin Drilon | Chair of the Philippine Senate; Finance Committee; 2013–2015 | Succeeded by Loren Legarda |
| Preceded by Sergio Osmeña III | Chair of the Philippine Senate; Banks, Financial Institutions and Currencies Committee; 2016–2019 | Succeeded by Grace Poe |
| Preceded by Bam Aquino | Chair of the Philippine Senate; Education, Arts and Culture Committee; 2017–2019 | Succeeded by Win Gatchalian |
| Preceded by Migz Zubiri | President of the Senate of the Philippines; 2024–2025 | Succeeded by Tito Sotto |
Political offices
| Preceded by Robert Lee Rodrigueza | Governor of Sorsogon; 2019-2022 | Succeeded by Jose Edwin Hamor |
