= List of current members of the House of Representatives of the Philippines =

House composition by district and party Lakas PFP NUP NPC Nacionalista Liberal HTL MKTZNU 1CEBU CDP LDP Navoteño PDP Independent Vacant

This is a list of individuals serving in the House of Representatives of the Philippines in the 20th Congress as of September 21, 2026. The current membership of the House comprises 254 seats for representatives from the electoral districts, apportioned by population, as well as 64 seats for party-lists elected via the party-list system. At present, there are 317 representatives and one vacancy.

== Composition ==
=== Current composition by party ===
House composition by party Lakas NUP PFP NPC Nacionalista Liberal HTL MKTZNU 1CEBU CDP LDP Navoteño PDP Independent Party-list Vacant

==== District representatives ====
Party	Seats
Lakas	76
NUP	56
PFP	51
NPC	35
Nacionalista	18
Liberal	6
Hugpong	3
MKTZNU	2
1CEBU	1
CDP	1
LDP	1
Navoteño	1
PDP	1
Independent	1
Vacant	1
Total	254

==== Party-list representatives ====
Party	Seats
Akbayan	3
Tingog	3
4Ps	2
ACT-CIS	2
Ako Bicol	2
1-Rider	1
1Tahanan	1
4K	1
Abamin	1
Abang Lingkod	1
Abono	1
ACT Teachers	1
AGAP	1
Agimat	1
Ako Bisaya	1
Ako Ilocano Ako	1
ALONA	1
Ang Probinsyano	1
APEC	1
Asenso Pinoy	1
BH	1
Bicol Saro	1
CIBAC	1
Coop-NATCCO	1
CWS	1
DUMPER PTDA	1
FPJ Panday Bayanihan	1
Gabriela	1
GP	1
Kabataan	1
Kamalayan	1
Kamanggagawa	1
KAPUSO PM	1
KM Ngayon Na	1
Kusug Tausug	1
LPGMA	1
MAGBUBUKID	1
Malasakit@Bayanihan	1
ML	1
Manila Teachers	1
Murang Kuryente	1
Nanay	1
ONE COOP	1
Philreca	1
Pinoy Workers	1
PPP	1
Pusong Pinoy	1
SAGIP	1
Senior Citizens	1
Solid North	1
SSS-GSIS Pensyonado	1
SWERTE	1
TGP	1
Trabaho	1
TUCP	1
United Senior Citizens	1
Uswag Ilonggo	1
Total	64

=== Current composition by bloc ===
Party	Bloc		
Party	Majority	Minority	Independent
Lakas	75	1	0
NUP	54	2	0
PFP	50	1	0
NPC	34	1	0
Nacionalista	17	1	0
Liberal	3	3	0
MKTZNU	2	0	0
1CEBU	1	0	0
CDP	1	0	0
LDP	1	0	0
Navoteño	1	0	0
PDP–Laban	1	0	0
Hugpong	0	0	3
Independent	1	0	0
Party-list	45	18	1
Total	286	27	4

== Leadership ==
=== Presiding officers ===
Office	Officer		Constituency	Since
Speaker of the House	Bojie Dy	PFP	Isabela–6th	September 17, 2025
Senior Deputy Speaker	Dinand Hernandez	PFP	South Cotabato–2nd	November 19, 2025
Deputy Speakers	Yasser Balindong	Lakas	Lanao del Sur–2nd	July 28, 2025
Deputy Speakers	Ferjenel Biron	Nacionalista	Iloilo–4th	July 28, 2025
Deputy Speakers	Janette Garin	Lakas	Iloilo–1st	July 28, 2025
Deputy Speakers	Jay Khonghun	Lakas	Zambales–1st	July 28, 2025
Deputy Speakers	Raymond Mendoza	TUCP	Party-list	July 28, 2025
Deputy Speakers	Paolo Ortega	Lakas	La Union–1st	July 28, 2025
Deputy Speakers	Ronaldo Puno	NUP	Antipolo–1st	July 28, 2025
Deputy Speakers	Yevgeny Emano	Nacionalista	Misamis Oriental–2nd	August 11, 2025
Deputy Speakers	David Suarez	Lakas	Quezon–2nd	November 19, 2025
Deputy Speakers	Maria Rachel Arenas	Lakas	Pangasinan–3rd	March 18, 2026
Deputy Speakers	Duke Frasco	1CEBU	Cebu–5th	March 18, 2026
Deputy Speakers	Albee Benitez	PFP	Bacolod at-large	March 18, 2026
Deputy Speakers	Mercedes Alvarez–Lansang	NPC	Negros Occidental–6th	August 3, 2026

=== Majority leadership ===
Office	Officer		Constituency	Since
Majority Floor Leader	Sandro Marcos	Lakas	Ilocos Norte–1st	July 28, 2025
Senior Deputy Majority Floor Leader	Lorenz Defensor	NUP	Iloilo–3rd	July 29, 2025
Deputy Majority Floor Leaders	Julienne Baronda	Lakas	Iloilo City at-large	July 29, 2025
Deputy Majority Floor Leaders	Marlyn Primicias-Agabas	Lakas	Pangasinan–6th	July 29, 2025
Deputy Majority Floor Leaders	Patrick Michael Vargas	PFP	Quezon City–5th	July 29, 2025
Deputy Majority Floor Leaders	Samantha Santos	Lakas	Cotabato–3rd	July 29, 2025
Deputy Majority Floor Leaders	Ernix Dionisio	NUP	Manila–1st	July 29, 2025
Deputy Majority Floor Leaders	Victoria Yu	Lakas	Zamboanga del Sur–2nd	July 29, 2025
Deputy Majority Floor Leaders	Arnan Panaligan	Lakas	Oriental Mindoro–1st	July 29, 2025
Deputy Majority Floor Leaders	Mica Gonzales	Lakas	Pampanga–3rd	July 29, 2025
Deputy Majority Floor Leaders	Dette Escudero	NPC	Sorsogon–1st	July 29, 2025
Deputy Majority Floor Leaders	Howard Guintu	Independent	Capiz–1st	July 29, 2025
Deputy Majority Floor Leaders	Wowo Fortes	NPC	Sorsogon–2nd	July 29, 2025
Deputy Majority Floor Leaders	Adrian Jay Advincula	NUP	Cavite–3rd	July 29, 2025
Deputy Majority Floor Leaders	Anna Victoria Tuazon	NUP	Leyte–3rd	July 29, 2025
Deputy Majority Floor Leaders	Crispin Diego Remulla	NUP	Cavite–7th	July 29, 2025
Deputy Majority Floor Leaders	Luigi Villafuerte	NUP	Camarines Sur–2nd	July 29, 2025
Deputy Majority Floor Leaders	Jose Teves Jr.	TGP	Party-list	July 29, 2025
Deputy Majority Floor Leaders	Munir Arbison Jr.	KAPUSO PM	Party-list	July 29, 2025
Deputy Majority Floor Leaders	Rodge Gutierrez	1-Rider	Party-list	July 29, 2025
Deputy Majority Floor Leaders	Eduardo Rama Jr.	Lakas	Cebu City–2nd	July 30, 2025
Assistant Majority Floor Leaders	Dimple Mastura	Lakas	Maguindanao del Norte at-large	July 29, 2025
Assistant Majority Floor Leaders	Rhea Gullas	NUP	Cebu–1st	July 29, 2025
Assistant Majority Floor Leaders	Daphne Lagon	NUP	Cebu–6th	July 29, 2025
Assistant Majority Floor Leaders	Pinpin Uy	Lakas	Zamboanga del Norte–1st	July 29, 2025
Assistant Majority Floor Leaders	Agay Cruz	PFP	Bulacan–5th	July 29, 2025
Assistant Majority Floor Leaders	De Carlo Uy	Lakas	Davao del Norte–1st	July 29, 2025
Assistant Majority Floor Leaders	Jhong Ceniza	Lakas	Davao de Oro–2nd	July 29, 2025
Assistant Majority Floor Leaders	Ronald Singson	NPC	Ilocos Sur–1st	July 29, 2025
Assistant Majority Floor Leaders	Mark Anthony Santos	NPC	Las Piñas at-large	July 29, 2025
Assistant Majority Floor Leaders	King Collantes	NPC	Batangas–3rd	July 29, 2025
Assistant Majority Floor Leaders	Patricia Calderon	NPC	Cebu–7th	July 29, 2025
Assistant Majority Floor Leaders	Arjo Atayde	NUP	Quezon City–1st	July 29, 2025
Assistant Majority Floor Leaders	Alexandria Gonzales	NUP	Mandaluyong at-large	July 29, 2025
Assistant Majority Floor Leaders	John Geesnell Yap	NUP	Bohol–1st	July 29, 2025
Assistant Majority Floor Leaders	Ralph Tulfo	PFP	Quezon City–2nd	July 29, 2025
Assistant Majority Floor Leaders	Esmael Mangudadatu	PFP	Maguindanao del Sur at-large	July 29, 2025
Assistant Majority Floor Leaders	Bella Suansing	PFP	Sultan Kudarat–2nd	July 29, 2025
Assistant Majority Floor Leaders	Javi Benitez	PFP	Negros Occidental–3rd	July 29, 2025
Assistant Majority Floor Leaders	Katrina Reiko Chua-Tai	PFP	Zamboanga City–1st	July 29, 2025
Assistant Majority Floor Leaders	Jorge Daniel Bocobo	Nacionalista	Taguig–Pateros–2nd	July 29, 2025
Assistant Majority Floor Leaders	Ryan Recto	Nacionalista	Batangas–6th	July 29, 2025
Assistant Majority Floor Leaders	James Ang Jr.	Uswag Ilonggo	Party-list	July 29, 2025
Assistant Majority Floor Leaders	Brian Poe Llamanzares	FPJ Panday Bayanihan	Party-list	July 29, 2025
Assistant Majority Floor Leaders	Johanne Monich Bautista	TRABAHO	Party-list	July 29, 2025
Assistant Majority Floor Leaders	Antonino Roman III	Lakas	Bataan–1st	July 30, 2025
Assistant Majority Floor Leaders	Ading Cruz	Nacionalista	Taguig–Pateros–1st	July 30, 2025
Assistant Majority Floor Leaders	Arman Dimaguila	PFP	Biñan at-large	July 30, 2025
Assistant Majority Floor Leaders	Bel Zamora	Lakas	San Juan at-large	August 4, 2025
Assistant Majority Floor Leaders	Aniela Tolentino	NUP	Cavite–8th	September 15, 2025
Assistant Majority Floor Leaders	Zia Alonto Adiong	Lakas	Lanao del Sur–1st	October 10, 2025
Assistant Majority Floor Leaders	Jonathan Keith Flores	Lakas	Bukidnon–2nd	December 3, 2025
Assistant Majority Floor Leaders	Lordan Suan	PFP	Cagayan de Oro–1st	December 3, 2025

=== Minority leadership ===
Office	Officer		Constituency	Since
Minority Floor Leader	Marcelino Libanan	4Ps	Party-list	July 25, 2022
Senior Deputy Minority Floor Leader	Leila de Lima	ML	Party-list	March 3, 2026
Deputy Minority Floor Leaders	Presley de Jesus	Philreca	Party-list	July 30, 2025
Deputy Minority Floor Leaders	Sergio Dagooc	APEC	Party-list	July 30, 2025
Deputy Minority Floor Leaders	Kaka Bag-ao	Liberal	Dinagat Islands at-large	July 30, 2025
Deputy Minority Floor Leaders	Stephen James Tan	Nacionalista	Samar–1st	July 30, 2025
Deputy Minority Floor Leaders	Perci Cendaña	Akbayan	Party-list	July 30, 2025
Deputy Minority Floor Leaders	Antonio Tinio	ACT Teachers	Party-list	July 30, 2025
Deputy Minority Floor Leaders	Bong Suntay	NPC	Quezon City–4th	July 30, 2025
Deputy Minority Floor Leaders	Jernie Jett Nisay	Pusong Pinoy	Party-list	July 30, 2025
Deputy Minority Floor Leaders	Reynolds Michael Tan	Lakas	Samar–2nd	July 30, 2025
Deputy Minority Floor Leaders	Krisel Lagman	Liberal	Albay–1st	July 30, 2025
Assistant Minority Floor Leaders	Sheen Gonzales	NUP	Eastern Samar at-large	July 30, 2025
Assistant Minority Floor Leaders	Renee Co	Kabataan	Party-list	July 30, 2025
Assistant Minority Floor Leaders	Chel Diokno	Akbayan	Party-list	July 30, 2025
Assistant Minority Floor Leaders	Roberto Nazal Jr.	BH	Party-list	July 30, 2025
Assistant Minority Floor Leaders	Niko Raul Daza	NUP	Northern Samar–1st	July 30, 2025
Assistant Minority Floor Leaders	Jan Rurik Padiernos	GP	Party-list	July 30, 2025
Assistant Minority Floor Leaders	Audrey Zubiri	PFP	Bukidnon–3rd	July 30, 2025
Assistant Minority Floor Leaders	Iris Marie Montes	4K	Party-list	July 30, 2025
Assistant Minority Floor Leaders	Sarah Elago	Gabriela	Party-list	September 23, 2025

=== Caucus leadership ===
Office	Officer		Constituency	Since
Lead Convenor of the House Visayas Caucus	Martin Romualdez	Lakas	Leyte–1st	August 7, 2025

== Regional membership ==
As of October 14, 2026, Lakas–CMD holds a relative majority in 11 of 18 regions.

As of October 14, 2026:

Region	Lakas	NUP	PFP	NPC	Nacionalista	Liberal	HTL	MKTZNU	1CEBU	CDP	LDP	Navoteño	PDP	Independent	Vacant	Total
NCR	4	13	3	5	3	2	0	2	0	0	0	1	0	0	0	33
CAR	2	1	1	2	1	0	0	0	0	0	0	0	0	0	0	7
I	7	0	0	3	2	0	0	0	0	0	0	0	0	0	0	12
II	4	0	7	0	0	0	0	0	0	0	0	0	0	0	1	12
III	6	6	9	2	0	0	0	0	0	0	1	0	0	0	0	24
IV-A	6	8	5	9	3	0	0	0	0	0	0	0	0	0	0	31
Mimaropa	3	1	1	1	1	1	0	0	0	0	0	0	0	0	0	8
V	6	4	1	4	0	1	0	0	0	0	0	0	0	0	0	16
VI	5	2	0	3	1	0	0	0	0	0	0	0	0	1	0	12
NIR	3	2	4	2	0	0	0	0	0	0	0	0	0	0	0	11
VII	3	8	1	1	0	0	0	0	1	0	0	0	0	0	0	14
VIII	4	4	3	1	1	0	0	0	0	0	0	0	0	0	0	13
IX	4	1	3	0	0	1	0	0	0	0	0	0	0	0	0	9
X	5	2	3	0	3	0	0	0	0	1	0	0	0	0	0	14
XI	5	0	2	1	0	0	3	0	0	0	0	0	0	0	0	11
XII	4	1	3	0	1	0	0	0	0	0	0	0	1	0	0	10
XIII	1	2	3	0	2	1	0	0	0	0	0	0	0	0	0	9
BARMM	5	1	2	0	0	0	0	0	0	0	0	0	0	0	0	8
Total	76	56	52	34	18	6	3	2	1	1	1	1	1	1	1	254

== Vacancies ==
- Batanes at-large: Jun Gato (NPC) died on September 21, 2026.

== List of representatives ==
List of representatives as of September 21, 2026:
Constituency	Portrait	Representative	Party	Bloc	Born	Prior experience	Took office
Abra at-large		Joseph Bernos	NUP (Note: Elected in 2025 under Lakas–CMD.)	Majority	October 6, 1978 (age 48)	House of Representatives Mayor of La Paz Vice Mayor of La Paz La Paz Municipal Council La Paz Sangguniang Kabataan Federation President	June 30, 2025
Agusan del Norte at-large		Dale Corvera	PFP	Majority	June 27, 1955 (age 71)	Governor of Agusan del Norte Mayor of Cabadbaran Vice Governor of Agusan del Norte Agusan del Norte Provincial Board Cabadbaran Municipal Council	June 30, 2022
Agusan del Sur–1st		Alfel Bascug	NUP	Majority	September 8, 1972 (age 54)		June 30, 2019
Agusan del Sur–2nd		Eddiebong Plaza	NUP	Majority	August 21, 1962 (age 64)	Industrial engineer Governor of Agusan del Sur	June 30, 2019
Aklan–1st		Jess Marquez	NPC	Majority	May 17, 1970 (age 56)	Businessman House of Representatives staff	June 30, 2025
Aklan–2nd		Florencio Miraflores	NPC	Majority	July 1, 1951 (age 75)	Businessman Governor of Aklan House of Representatives Mayor of Ibajay	June 30, 2025
Albay–1st		Krisel Lagman	Liberal	Minority	November 9, 1968 (age 58)	Public health practitioner Mayor of Tabaco House of Representatives	June 30, 2025
Albay–2nd		Caloy Loria	NUP (Note: Elected in 2025 under Partido Demokratiko Pilipino.)	Majority	November 12, 1965 (age 61)	Businessman	June 30, 2025
Albay–3rd		Adrian Salceda	Lakas	Majority	February 1, 1993 (age 33)	Mayor of Polangui Polangui Association of Barangay Captains President Albay Sangguniang Kabataan Federation President	June 30, 2025
Antipolo–1st		Ronaldo Puno	NUP	Majority	April 25, 1948 (age 78)	Secretary of the Interior and Local Government House of Representatives	June 30, 2025
Antipolo–2nd		Bong Acop	NUP	Majority	April 13, 1974 (age 52)	Physician Antipolo City Council	March 16, 2026
Antique at-large		Antonio Legarda Jr.	NPC	Majority	December 8, 1968 (age 57)		June 30, 2022
Apayao at-large		Eleanor Begtang	NPC	Majority	February 28, 1964 (age 62)	Governor of Apayao House of Representatives Mayor of Calanasan	June 30, 2022
Aurora at-large		Rommel T. Angara	LDP	Majority	December 19, 1978 (age 47)	Vice Governor of Aurora House of Representatives staff	June 30, 2019
Bacolod at-large		Albee Benitez	PFP (Note: Elected in 2025 as an independent.)	Majority	December 20, 1966 (age 59)	Businessman Mayor of Bacolod House of Representatives	June 30, 2025
Baguio at-large		Mauricio Domogan	Lakas	Majority	October 10, 1946 (age 80)	Lawyer Mayor of Baguio House of Representatives Vice Mayor of Baguio Baguio City Council	June 30, 2025
Basilan at-large		Yusop Alano	PFP	Majority	June 9, 1976 (age 50)	Vice Governor of Basilan	June 30, 2025
Bataan–1st		Antonino Roman III	Lakas	Majority	June 3, 1968 (age 58)	Lawyer Bataan Provincial Board	June 30, 2025
Bataan–2nd		Albert Garcia	NUP	Majority	February 1, 1970 (age 56)	Governor of Bataan House of Representatives Mayor of Balanga	June 30, 2022
Bataan–3rd		Maria Angela Garcia	NUP	Majority	February 17, 1968 (age 58)	Mayor of Dinalupihan Consultant Subic Bay Metropolitan Authority Board of Directors	June 30, 2022
Batanes at-large	Vacant (Note: Jun Gato died on September 21, 2026.)						
Batangas–1st		Leandro Leviste	Lakas	Majority	March 18, 1993 (age 33)	Businessman	June 30, 2025
Batangas–2nd		Gerville Luistro	Lakas	Majority	October 3, 1975 (age 51)	Lawyer	June 30, 2022
Batangas–3rd		King Collantes	NPC	Majority	October 11, 1980 (age 46)	Lawyer	June 30, 2025
Batangas–4th		Caloy Bolilia	Nacionalista	Majority	November 3, 1966 (age 60)	Businessman Batangas Provincial Board	June 30, 2025
Batangas–5th		Beverley Dimacuha	Nacionalista	Majority	October 3, 1971 (age 55)	Mayor of Batangas City	June 30, 2025
Batangas–6th		Ryan Recto	Nacionalista	Majority	March 29, 1996 (age 30)	Entrepreneur	June 30, 2025
Benguet at-large		Eric Yap	Lakas	Majority	May 11, 1979 (age 47)		July 3, 2025
Biliran at-large		Gerardo Espina Jr.	Lakas	Majority	August 7, 1970 (age 56)	Governor of Biliran House of Representatives Mayor of Naval	June 30, 2019
Biñan at-large		Arman Dimaguila	PFP	Majority	October 9, 1971 (age 55)	Lawyer Mayor of Biñan	June 30, 2025
Bohol–1st		John Geesnell Yap	NUP (Note: Elected in 2025 under Laban ng Demokratikong Pilipino.)	Majority	October 16, 1977 (age 49)	Entrepreneur Mayor of Tagbilaran Tagbilaran City Council	June 30, 2025
Bohol–2nd		Vanvan Aumentado	NUP	Majority	May 21, 1981 (age 45)	Businesswoman Registered nurse	June 30, 2022
Bohol–3rd		Alexie Tutor	NUP	Majority	January 24, 1980 (age 46)	Physical Therapist Bohol Provincial Board	June 30, 2019
Bukidnon–1st		Jose Manuel Alba	NUP	Majority	May 12, 1975 (age 51)		June 30, 2022
Bukidnon–2nd		Jonathan Keith Flores	Lakas	Majority	April 16, 1972 (age 54)	Lawyer	June 30, 2019
Bukidnon–3rd		Audrey Zubiri	PFP	Minority	October 11, 1982 (age 44)	Businesswoman	June 30, 2025
Bukidnon–4th		Laarni Roque	Nacionalista	Majority	September 18, 1971 (age 55)	Teacher	June 30, 2022
Bulacan–1st		Danny Domingo	NUP	Majority	December 24, 1951 (age 74)	Lawyer Mayor of Malolos Vice Mayor of Malolos	June 30, 2022
Bulacan–2nd		Tina Pancho	NUP	Majority	August 4, 1964 (age 62)	Businesswoman House of Representatives staff	June 30, 2022
Bulacan–3rd		Cholo Violago	PFP	Majority	August 28, 1984 (age 42)	Businessman Mayor of San Rafael Bulacan Association of Barangay Captains President	June 30, 2025
Bulacan–4th		Linabelle Villarica	PFP	Majority	July 25, 1948 (age 78)	Mayor of Meycauayan House of Representatives	June 30, 2022
Bulacan–5th		Agay Cruz	PFP	Majority	October 1, 1980 (age 46)	Lawyer Mayor of Guiguinto	June 30, 2025
Bulacan–6th		Salvador Pleyto	PFP	Majority	March 22, 1942 (age 84)	Civil engineer Businessman Department of Public Works and Highways Undersecretary	June 30, 2022
Butuan at-large		Jose Aquino II	Lakas	Majority	March 18, 1956 (age 70)	Vice Mayor of Butuan House of Representatives Butuan City Council	June 30, 2022
Cagayan–1st		Ramon Nolasco	PFP	Majority	July 21, 1949 (age 77)	Lawyer House of Representatives Cagayan Provincial Board Mayor of Gattaran	June 30, 2025
Cagayan–2nd		Baby Alfonso	PFP	Majority	December 5, 1962 (age 63)	House of Representatives Vice Mayor of Abulug	June 30, 2022
Cagayan–3rd		Joseph Lara	Lakas	Majority	July 19, 1966 (age 60)		June 30, 2019
Cagayan de Oro–1st		Lordan Suan	PFP	Majority	July 22, 1983 (age 43)	Cagayan de Oro City Council	June 30, 2022
Cagayan de Oro–2nd		Rufus Rodriguez	CDP	Majority	September 13, 1953 (age 73)	Lawyer House of Representatives Vice Governor of Misamis Oriental Misamis Oriental Provincial Board	June 30, 2019
Calamba at-large		Cha Hernandez	Lakas	Majority	September 8, 1993 (age 33)	Calamba City Council	June 30, 2022
Caloocan–1st		Oscar Malapitan	Nacionalista	Majority	June 14, 1955 (age 71)	Mayor of Caloocan House of Representatives Vice Mayor of Caloocan Caloocan City Council	June 30, 2022
Caloocan–2nd		Edgar Erice	Liberal	Minority	June 15, 1960 (age 66)	Businessman House of Representatives Vice Mayor of Caloocan Caloocan City Council	June 30, 2025
Caloocan–3rd		Dean Asistio	NUP	Majority	August 26, 1989 (age 37)	Caloocan City Council	June 30, 2022
Camarines Norte–1st		Josefina Tallado	NPC	Majority	May 7, 1969 (age 57)		June 30, 2019
Camarines Norte–2nd		Rosemarie Panotes	Lakas	Majority	January 18, 1985 (age 41)		June 30, 2022
Camarines Sur–1st		Hori Horibata	NUP	Majority	June 5, 1993 (age 33)	Baseball player	June 30, 2022
Camarines Sur–2nd		Luigi Villafuerte	NUP	Majority	November 7, 1996 (age 30)	Businessman Governor of Camarines Sur	June 30, 2025
Camarines Sur–3rd		Nelson Legacion	NPC	Majority	March 1, 1968 (age 58)	Lawyer Mayor of Naga Vice Mayor of Naga Naga City Council	June 30, 2025
Camarines Sur–4th		Arnulf Bryan Fuentebella	NPC	Majority	January 29, 1976 (age 50)	Businessman Mayor of Tigaon	June 30, 2019
Camarines Sur–5th		Miguel Luis Villafuerte	NUP	Majority	January 21, 1989 (age 37)	Businessman Governor of Camarines Sur	June 30, 2022
Camiguin at-large		Jurdin Jesus Romualdo	Lakas	Majority	July 29, 1960 (age 66)	Governor of Camiguin House of Representatives	June 30, 2025
Capiz–1st		Howard Guintu	Independent	Majority	April 27, 1988 (age 38)		June 30, 2022
Capiz–2nd		Jane Castro	Lakas	Majority	October 21, 1958 (age 68)	House of Representatives	June 30, 2022
Catanduanes at-large		Eulogio Rodriguez	PFP	Majority	May 10, 1959 (age 67)	Mayor of Bato	June 30, 2022
Cavite–1st		Jolo Revilla	NUP	Majority	March 15, 1988 (age 38)	Actor Vice Governor of Cavite	June 30, 2022
Cavite–2nd		Lani Mercado	Lakas	Majority	April 13, 1968 (age 58)	Actress Mayor of Bacoor House of Representatives	June 30, 2022
Cavite–3rd		Adrian Jay Advincula	NUP	Majority	October 20, 1993 (age 33)	Businessman	June 30, 2022
Cavite–4th		Jenny Barzaga	NUP	Majority	September 22, 1975 (age 51)	Registered nurse Mayor of Dasmariñas House of Representatives	September 1, 2026
Cavite–5th		Roy Loyola	NPC	Majority	February 17, 1962 (age 64)	Lawyer Mayor of Carmona House of Representatives	June 30, 2022
Cavite–6th		Antonio Ferrer	NUP	Majority	November 10, 1966 (age 60)	Mayor of General Trias House of Representatives of the Philippines	June 30, 2022
Cavite–7th		Crispin Diego Remulla	NUP	Majority	September 28, 1990 (age 36)	Cavite Provincial Board Indang Municipal Council	February 28, 2023
Cavite–8th		Aniela Tolentino	NUP	Majority	May 8, 1996 (age 30)	Businesswoman	June 30, 2022
Cebu–1st		Rhea Gullas	NUP	Majority	August 9, 1988 (age 38)		June 30, 2022
Cebu–2nd		Edsel Galeos	Lakas	Majority	March 12, 1959 (age 67)	Civil engineer Cebu Provincial Board Mayor of Argao	June 30, 2022
Cebu–3rd		Karen Flores-Garcia	NUP	Majority	November 8, 1974 (age 52)	Communications consultant	June 30, 2025
Cebu–4th		Sun Shimura	NUP (Note: Elected in 2025 under Pwersa ng Masang Pilipino.)	Majority	December 3, 1982 (age 43)	Mayor of Daanbantayan	June 30, 2025
Cebu–5th		Duke Frasco	1CEBU (Note: Elected in 2025 under the National Unity Party.)	Majority	October 27, 1980 (age 46)	Mayor of Liloan	June 30, 2019
Cebu–6th		Daphne Lagon	NUP	Majority	November 29, 1978 (age 47)		June 30, 2022
Cebu–7th		Patricia Calderon	NPC	Majority	September 12, 1963 (age 63)	Physician	June 30, 2025
Cebu City–1st		Rachel del Mar	NUP (Note: Elected in 2025 under the Nationalist People's Coalition.)	Majority	November 3, 1966 (age 60)	House of Representatives staff Movie and Television Review and Classification Board Cultural Center of the Philippines Board of Directors	June 30, 2022
Cebu City–2nd		Eduardo Rama Jr.	Lakas	Majority	December 2, 1978 (age 47)	Cebu City Council	June 30, 2022
Cotabato–1st		Edwin Cruzado	Lakas	Majority	May 19, 1962 (age 64)	Physician	June 30, 2025
Cotabato–2nd		Rudy Caoagdan	Nacionalista	Majority	June 5, 1962 (age 64)	Mayor of Makilala Philippine Army	June 30, 2019
Cotabato–3rd		Samantha Santos	Lakas	Majority	March 24, 1997 (age 29)	Businesswoman	June 30, 2022
Davao City–1st		Paolo Duterte	HTL	Independent	March 24, 1975 (age 51)	Vice Mayor of Davao City Liga ng mga Barangay National Vice President for Mindanao Davao City Association of Barangay Captains President	June 30, 2019
Davao City–2nd		Omar Duterte	HTL	Independent	January 26, 1994 (age 32)	Businessman Barangay captain	June 30, 2025
Davao City–3rd		Isidro Ungab	HTL	Independent	May 8, 1961 (age 65)	House of Representatives Davao City Council	June 30, 2019
Davao de Oro–1st		Maricar Zamora	PFP	Majority	May 3, 1974 (age 52)	House of Representatives	June 30, 2022
Davao de Oro–2nd		Jhong Ceniza	Lakas	Majority	December 23, 1979 (age 46)	Mayor of Pantukan	June 30, 2025
Davao del Norte–1st		De Carlo Uy	Lakas	Majority	January 12, 1985 (age 41)	Vice Governor of Davao del Norte	June 30, 2025
Davao del Norte–2nd		Jose Manuel Lagdameo	PFP	Majority	March 1, 1974 (age 52)	Industrial engineer Businessman	June 30, 2025
Davao del Sur at-large		John Tracy Cagas	Lakas (Note: Elected in 2025 under the Nacionalista Party.)	Majority	November 13, 1965 (age 61)	Lawyer Vice Governor of Davao del Sur Davao del Sur Provincial Board Digos City Council	June 30, 2022
Davao Occidental at-large		Claude Bautista	NPC	Majority	January 17, 1960 (age 66)	Businessman Governor of Davao Occidental Governor of Davao del Sur House of Representatives	June 30, 2022
Davao Oriental–1st		Nelson Dayanghirang Jr.	Lakas	Majority	June 17, 1993 (age 33)	Vice Governor of Davao Oriental	June 30, 2025
Davao Oriental–2nd		Cheeno Almario	NPC	Majority	January 14, 1993 (age 33)	Mati City Council	June 30, 2022
Dinagat Islands at-large		Kaka Bag-ao	Liberal	Minority	July 3, 1969 (age 57)	Lawyer Governor of Dinagat Islands House of Representatives	June 30, 2025
Eastern Samar at-large		Sheen Gonzales	NUP	Minority	May 7, 1980 (age 46)	Businessman Mayor of Guiuan Vice Governor of Eastern Samar	June 30, 2025
General Santos at-large		Shirlyn Bañas-Nograles	PDP	Majority	June 28, 1974 (age 52)	Businesswoman House of Representatives Vice Mayor of General Santos General Santos City Council	June 30, 2025
Guimaras at-large		JC Rahman Nava	NUP	Majority	November 19, 1962 (age 63)	Physician Governor of Guimaras House of Representatives	June 30, 2025
Ifugao at-large		Solomon Chungalao	NPC	Majority	December 4, 1955 (age 70)	Lawyer	June 30, 2019
Iligan at-large		Celso Regencia	Lakas	Majority	January 9, 1961 (age 65)	Mayor of Iligan	June 30, 2022
Ilocos Norte–1st		Sandro Marcos	Lakas (Note: Elected in 2025 under Partido Federal ng Pilipinas.)	Majority	March 7, 1994 (age 32)	House of Representatives staff Consultant	June 30, 2022
Ilocos Norte–2nd		Angelo Barba	Nacionalista	Majority	December 13, 1958 (age 67)	Vice Governor of Ilocos Norte	June 30, 2019
Ilocos Sur–1st		Ronald Singson	NPC	Majority	November 18, 1968 (age 57)	Businessman House of Representatives	June 30, 2022
Ilocos Sur–2nd		Kristine Singson-Meehan	NPC	Majority	November 21, 1973 (age 52)	Businesswoman	June 30, 2019
Iloilo–1st		Janette Garin	Lakas	Majority	December 11, 1972 (age 53)	Physician Secretary of Health House of Representatives	June 30, 2019
Iloilo–2nd		Kathryn Joyce Gorriceta	Lakas	Majority	August 12, 1980 (age 46)	Physician	June 30, 2025
Iloilo–3rd		Lorenz Defensor	NUP	Majority	July 24, 1977 (age 49)	Lawyer Iloilo Provincial Board	June 30, 2019
Iloilo–4th		Ferjenel Biron	Nacionalista	Majority	December 26, 1964 (age 61)	Businessman House of Representatives	June 30, 2022
Iloilo–5th		Binky April Tupas	Lakas	Majority	April 11, 1979 (age 47)	Iloilo Provincial Board	June 30, 2025
Iloilo City at-large		Julienne Baronda	Lakas	Majority	February 16, 1978 (age 48)	Senate staff Iloilo City Sangguniang Kabataan Federation President	June 30, 2019
Isabela–1st		Tonypet Albano	PFP	Majority	November 26, 1965 (age 60)	Vice Governor of Isabela Radio Philippines Network President and Chairman	June 30, 2019
Isabela–2nd		Ed Christopher Go	PFP	Majority	June 30, 1989 (age 37)		June 30, 2019
Isabela–3rd		Ian Paul Dy	Lakas	Majority	May 31, 1981 (age 45)	Mayor of Alicia Vice Mayor of Alicia Alicia Municipal Council	June 30, 2019
Isabela–4th		Joseph Tan	PFP	Majority	October 21, 1963 (age 63)	Civil engineer Mayor of Santiago	June 30, 2022
Isabela–5th		Mike Dy III	Lakas	Majority	September 17, 1979 (age 47)	Mayor of San Manuel	June 30, 2019
Isabela–6th		Bojie Dy	PFP	Majority	August 31, 1961 (age 65)	Vice Governor of Isabela Governor of Isabela House of Representatives Mayor of Cauayan	June 30, 2025
Kalinga at-large		Caroline Agyao	PFP	Majority	December 24, 1969 (age 56)	Physician	June 30, 2025
La Union–1st		Paolo Ortega	Lakas	Majority	April 14, 1984 (age 42)	San Fernando City Council	June 30, 2022
La Union–2nd		Dante Garcia	Lakas	Majority	November 22, 1971 (age 54)	Registered nurse	June 30, 2022
Laguna–1st		Ann Matibag	PFP	Majority	January 26, 1984 (age 42)	Laguna Provincial Board	June 30, 2022
Laguna–2nd		Ramil Hernandez	Lakas	Majority	July 26, 1972 (age 54)	Governor of Laguna Vice Governor of Laguna Laguna Provincial Board Calamba City Council	June 30, 2025
Laguna–3rd		Loreto Amante	PFP	Majority	September 1, 1982 (age 44)	Mayor of San Pablo	June 30, 2022
Laguna–4th		Benjamin Agarao Jr.	PFP	Majority	October 1, 1957 (age 69)	Businessman House of Representatives Laguna Provincial Board	June 30, 2025
Lanao del Norte–1st		Imelda Dimaporo	PFP	Majority	January 15, 1959 (age 67)	Governor of Lanao del Norte House of Representatives	June 30, 2025
Lanao del Norte–2nd		Aminah Dimaporo	Lakas	Majority	August 27, 1986 (age 40)		June 30, 2022
Lanao del Sur–1st		Zia Alonto Adiong	Lakas	Majority	January 16, 1979 (age 47)	Bangsamoro Parliament ARMM Regional Legislative Assembly	June 30, 2022
Lanao del Sur–2nd		Yasser Balindong	Lakas	Majority	February 28, 1974 (age 52)	ARMM Regional Legislative Assembly Vice Governor of Lanao del Sur	June 30, 2019
Lapu-Lapu City at-large		Junard Chan	PFP	Majority	September 8, 1968 (age 58)	Mayor of Lapu-Lapu City Barangay captain Lapu-Lapu City Council	June 30, 2025
Las Piñas at-large		Mark Anthony Santos	NPC	Majority	June 14, 1963 (age 63)	Las Piñas City Council	June 30, 2025
Leyte–1st		Martin Romualdez	Lakas	Majority	November 14, 1963 (age 62)	Businessman Lawyer House of Representatives	June 30, 2019
Leyte–2nd		Lolita Javier	NPC	Majority	February 20, 1975 (age 51)		June 30, 2019
Leyte–3rd		Anna Veloso-Tuazon	NUP	Majority	September 3, 1978 (age 48)	Lawyer Leyte Provincial Board	June 30, 2022
Leyte–4th		Richard Gomez	PFP	Majority	April 7, 1966 (age 60)	Actor and TV host Mayor of Ormoc	June 30, 2022
Leyte–5th		Carl Cari	Lakas	Majority	July 4, 1992 (age 34)	Manufacturing engineer Baybay Association of Barangay Captains President Baybay Sangguniang Kabataan Federation President	June 30, 2019
Maguindanao del Norte at-large		Dimple Mastura	Lakas	Majority	November 27, 1990 (age 35)	Bangsamoro Parliament	June 30, 2022
Maguindanao del Sur at-large		Esmael Mangudadatu	PFP	Majority	August 15, 1968 (age 58)	House of Representatives Governor of Maguindanao Vice Mayor of Buluan Mayor of Buluan Maguindanao Provincial Board	June 30, 2025
Makati–1st		Monique Lagdameo	MKTZNU	Majority	July 25, 1975 (age 51)	Vice Mayor of Makati House of Representatives Makati City Council	June 30, 2025
Makati–2nd		Alden Almario	MKTZNU	Majority	April 27, 1971 (age 55)	Makati City Council	June 30, 2025
Malabon at-large		Antolin Oreta III	NUP	Majority	September 16, 1971 (age 55)	Businessman Mayor of Malabon Vice Mayor of Malabon Malabon City Council	June 30, 2025
Mandaluyong at-large		Alexandria Gonzales	NUP	Majority	November 13, 1977 (age 49)	Businesswoman House of Representatives	June 30, 2025
Mandaue at-large		Emmarie Dizon	Lakas	Majority	April 1, 1970 (age 56)	Mandaue City Council	June 30, 2019
Manila–1st		Ernix Dionisio	NUP	Majority	May 22, 1978 (age 48)	Businessman Manila City Council	June 30, 2022
Manila–2nd		Rolan Valeriano	NUP	Majority	December 11, 1964 (age 61)	Customs broker Manila City Council	June 30, 2022
Manila–3rd		Joel Chua	NUP	Majority	August 17, 1972 (age 54)	Lawyer Manila City Council House of Representatives staff Senate legal consultant	June 30, 2022
Manila–4th		Giselle Lazaro-Maceda	NPC (Note: Elected in 2025 under Asenso Manileño.)	Majority	August 6, 1970 (age 56)	Physician	June 30, 2025
Manila–5th		Irwin Tieng	NUP	Majority	November 21, 1980 (age 45)	Manila City Council House of Representatives	June 30, 2022
Manila–6th		Benny Abante	NUP	Majority	July 15, 1951 (age 75)	Pastor House of Representatives Manila City Council	July 8, 2025
Marikina–1st		Marcelino Teodoro	NUP	Majority	August 2, 1970 (age 56)	Mayor of Marikina House of Representatives Marikina City Council	July 1, 2025
Marikina–2nd		Miro Quimbo	PFP	Majority	December 12, 1969 (age 56)	Lawyer House of Representatives CEO of the Pag-IBIG Fund House of Representatives staff	June 30, 2025
Marinduque at-large		Reynaldo Salvacion	Lakas	Majority	February 4, 1960 (age 66)	Businessman Marinduque Provincial Board	June 30, 2025
Masbate–1st		Antonio Kho	Lakas	Majority	January 9, 1958 (age 68)	Civil engineer Businessman Governor of Masbate House of Representatives Mayor of Cataingan	June 30, 2025
Masbate–2nd		Elisa Olga Kho	Lakas	Majority	July 1, 1956 (age 70)	Medical doctor Businesswoman Vice Governor of Masbate House of Representatives Governor of Masbate	June 30, 2025
Masbate–3rd		Wilton Kho	Lakas	Majority	May 13, 1986 (age 40)	Mayor of Cataingan	June 30, 2019
Misamis Occidental–1st		Jason Almonte	Nacionalista	Majority	June 20, 1970 (age 56)	Businessman Mayor of Oroquieta	June 30, 2022
Misamis Occidental–2nd		Ando Oaminal	Lakas	Majority	March 17, 1993 (age 33)	Businessman Mayor of Ozamiz	June 30, 2022
Misamis Oriental–1st		Karen Lagbas	NUP	Majority	February 26, 1976 (age 50)	Lawyer	June 30, 2025
Misamis Oriental–2nd		Yevgeny Emano	Nacionalista	Majority	January 29, 1975 (age 51)	Governor of Misamis Oriental Mayor of Tagoloan	June 30, 2022
Mountain Province at-large		Maximo Dalog Jr.	Nacionalista	Majority	April 10, 1978 (age 48)	Lawyer	June 30, 2019
Muntinlupa at-large		Jaime Fresnedi	Liberal	Majority	April 27, 1950 (age 76)	Businessman Lawyer Mayor of Muntinlupa Vice Mayor of Muntinlupa	June 30, 2022
Navotas at-large		Toby Tiangco	Navoteño	Majority	November 21, 1967 (age 58)	Businessman Mayor of Navotas House of Representatives Vice Mayor of Navotas	June 30, 2022
Negros Occidental–1st		Jules Ledesma	NPC	Majority	August 1, 1960 (age 66)	House of Representatives	June 30, 2025
Negros Occidental–2nd		Alfredo Marañon III	NUP	Majority	June 26, 1970 (age 56)	House of Representatives	June 30, 2022
Negros Occidental–3rd		Javi Benitez	PFP	Majority	October 8, 1994 (age 32)	Actor Mayor of Victorias	June 30, 2025
Negros Occidental–4th		Jeffrey Ferrer	NUP	Majority	May 6, 1969 (age 57)	Vice Governor of Negros Occidental House of Representatives	June 30, 2025
Negros Occidental–5th		Dino Yulo	Lakas	Majority	May 20, 1963 (age 63)	Lawyer	June 30, 2022
Negros Occidental–6th		Mercedes Alvarez–Lansang	NPC	Majority	October 20, 1982 (age 44)	House of Representatives	June 30, 2022
Negros Oriental–1st		Emmanuel Iway	PFP	Majority	September 25, 1982 (age 44)	Mayor of La Libertad	June 30, 2025
Negros Oriental–2nd		Maisa Sagarbarria	Lakas	Majority	March 1, 1960 (age 66)	Vice Mayor of Dumaguete	June 30, 2025
Negros Oriental–3rd		Janice Degamo	Lakas	Majority	January 11, 1976 (age 50)	Mayor of Pamplona	June 30, 2025
Northern Samar–1st		Niko Raul Daza	NUP	Minority	May 14, 1993 (age 33)	Accountant	June 30, 2025
Northern Samar–2nd		Edwin Ongchuan	PFP	Majority	March 3, 1968 (age 58)	Governor of Northern Samar House of Representatives	June 30, 2025
Nueva Ecija–1st		Mika Suansing	PFP	Majority	October 24, 1991 (age 35)	House of Representatives staff	June 30, 2022
Nueva Ecija–2nd		Kokoy Salvador	PFP	Majority	April 1, 1967 (age 59)	Businessman Mayor of San Jose	June 30, 2025
Nueva Ecija–3rd		Jay Vergara	PFP	Majority	January 5, 1960 (age 66)	Vice Mayor of Cabanatuan	June 30, 2025
Nueva Ecija–4th		Emerson Pascual	NUP	Majority	October 19, 1972 (age 54)	Businessman Mayor of Gapan	June 30, 2022
Nueva Vizcaya at-large		Tim Cayton	PFP (Note: Elected in 2025 under Aksyon Demokratiko.)	Majority	May 15, 1981 (age 45)	Lawyer Mayor of Dupax del Norte Dupax del Norte Municipal Council	June 30, 2025
Occidental Mindoro at-large		Leody Tarriela	PFP	Majority	October 2, 1968 (age 58)	Businessman	June 30, 2025
Oriental Mindoro–1st		Arnan Panaligan	Lakas	Majority	January 21, 1962 (age 64)	Lawyer Mayor of Calapan Governor of Oriental Mindoro Vice Governor of Oriental Mindoro	June 30, 2022
Oriental Mindoro–2nd		Alfonso Umali Jr.	Liberal	Majority	April 29, 1955 (age 71)	Architect Governor of Oriental Mindoro House of Representatives	June 30, 2019
Palawan–1st		Rosalie Salvame	NUP (Note: Elected in 2025 under the People's Reform Party.)	Majority	December 10, 1963 (age 62)	Businesswoman	June 30, 2025
Palawan–2nd		Jose Alvarez	NPC	Majority	June 29, 1944 (age 82)	Businessman President of Partido Demokratiko Pilipino Governor of Palawan	June 30, 2022
Palawan–3rd		Gil Acosta Jr.	NPC	Majority	May 10, 1985 (age 41)	Lawyer House of Representatives	June 30, 2025
Pampanga–1st		Carmelo Lazatin Jr.	PFP	Majority	August 28, 1969 (age 57)	Businessman Angeles City Council Mayor of Angeles City	June 30, 2025
Pampanga–2nd		Gloria Macapagal Arroyo	Lakas	Majority	April 5, 1947 (age 79)	House of Representatives President of the Philippines Vice President of the Philippines Senator	June 30, 2022
Pampanga–3rd		Mica Gonzales	Lakas	Majority	September 11, 1994 (age 32)	Businesswoman Pampanga Provincial Board	June 30, 2025
Pampanga–4th		Anna York Bondoc	NUP	Majority	May 11, 1967 (age 59)	Pulmonologist House of Representatives	June 30, 2022
Pangasinan–1st		Arthur Celeste	Nacionalista	Majority	December 14, 1962 (age 63)	Mayor of Alaminos House of Representatives Alaminos City Council	June 30, 2022
Pangasinan–2nd		Mark Cojuangco	NPC	Majority	October 6, 1957 (age 69)	Businessman House of Representatives	June 30, 2022
Pangasinan–3rd		Maria Rachel Arenas	Lakas	Majority	November 15, 1971 (age 54)	Movie and Television Review and Classification Board Chairperson House of Representatives	June 30, 2022
Pangasinan–4th		Gina de Venecia	Lakas	Majority	February 15, 1949 (age 77)	Businesswoman House of Representatives	June 30, 2025
Pangasinan–5th		Ramon Guico Jr.	Lakas	Majority	December 10, 1953 (age 72)	Mayor of Binalonan League of Municipalities President	June 30, 2022
Pangasinan–6th		Marlyn Primicias-Agabas	Lakas	Majority	July 23, 1969 (age 57)	Lawyer House of Representatives Vice Governor of Pangasinan Pangasinan Provincial Board San Nicolas Municipal Council	June 30, 2022
Parañaque–1st		Eric Olivarez	Lakas	Majority	October 4, 1970 (age 56)	Mayor of Parañaque House of Representatives Parañaque City Council	June 30, 2025
Parañaque–2nd		Brian Yamsuan	NUP	Majority	October 19, 1973 (age 53)	Government consultant Deputy Secretary General of the House of Representatives Office of the Press Secretary staff Senate staff	February 22, 2023
Pasay at-large		Antonino Calixto	Lakas	Majority	May 10, 1954 (age 72)	Businessman Mayor of Pasay Vice Mayor of Pasay Pasay City Council	June 30, 2019
Pasig at-large		Roman Romulo	NPC	Majority	February 28, 1967 (age 59)	Lawyer House of Representatives	June 30, 2019
Quezon–1st		Mark Enverga	NPC	Majority	March 25, 1978 (age 48)	House of Representatives	June 30, 2019
Quezon–2nd		David C. Suarez	Lakas	Majority	January 25, 1977 (age 49)	Governor of Quezon Vice Governor of Quezon Unisan Municipal Council	June 30, 2019
Quezon–3rd		Reynante Arrogancia	NPC	Majority	January 19, 1972 (age 54)	Quezon Provincial Board	June 30, 2022
Quezon–4th		Keith Micah Tan	NPC	Majority	March 1, 1995 (age 31)	Lawyer	June 30, 2022
Quezon City–1st		Arjo Atayde	NUP	Majority	November 5, 1990 (age 36)	Actor Businessman	June 30, 2022
Quezon City–2nd		Ralph Tulfo	PFP	Majority	July 12, 1996 (age 30)		June 30, 2022
Quezon City–3rd		Franz Pumaren	NUP	Majority	February 5, 1962 (age 64)	Professional basketball player and coach Quezon City Council	June 30, 2022
Quezon City–4th		Bong Suntay	NPC (Note: Elected in 2025 under the United Nationalist Alliance.)	Minority	November 15, 1970 (age 55)	Lawyer Businessman House of Representatives Quezon City Council	June 30, 2025
Quezon City–5th		Patrick Michael Vargas	PFP	Majority	January 27, 1982 (age 44)	Quezon City Council	June 30, 2022
Quezon City–6th		Marivic Co-Pilar	NUP	Majority	March 25, 1971 (age 55)	Quezon City Council	June 30, 2022
Quirino at-large		Midy Cua	Lakas	Majority	June 11, 1979 (age 47)		June 30, 2022
Rizal–1st		Mia Ynares	NPC	Majority	October 1, 1976 (age 50)	Businesswoman	June 30, 2025
Rizal–2nd		Dino Tanjuatco	NPC	Majority	January 12, 1970 (age 56)	Lawyer Rizal Provincial Board President and CEO of the Clark International Airport Corporation	June 30, 2022
Rizal–3rd		Jose Arturo Garcia Jr.	NPC	Majority	March 29, 1969 (age 57)	Metropolitan Manila Development Authority General Manager	June 30, 2022
Rizal–4th		Dennis Hernandez	NPC	Majority	July 19, 1984 (age 42)	Mayor of Rodriguez Vice Mayor of Rodriguez	June 30, 2025
Romblon at-large		Eleandro Jesus Madrona	Nacionalista	Majority	December 16, 1949 (age 76)	Lawyer House of Representatives Governor of Romblon	June 30, 2019
Samar–1st		Stephen James Tan	Nacionalista	Minority	September 13, 1983 (age 43)	Businessman	June 30, 2022
Samar–2nd		Reynolds Michael Tan	Lakas	Minority	November 18, 1988 (age 37)	Governor of Samar Vice Governor of Samar	June 30, 2022
San Jose del Monte at-large		Arthur Robes	Lakas	Majority	November 6, 1963 (age 63)	Mayor of San Jose del Monte House of Representatives	June 30, 2025
San Juan at-large		Bel Zamora	Lakas	Majority	June 8, 1983 (age 43)	Lawyer House of Representatives staff	June 30, 2022
Santa Rosa at-large		Roy Gonzales	PFP	Majority	October 30, 1971 (age 55)	Santa Rosa City Council	June 30, 2025
Sarangani at-large		Steve Solon	NUP	Majority	March 3, 1971 (age 55)	Businessman Governor of Sarangani Vice Governor of Sarangani	June 30, 2022
Siquijor at-large		Zaldy Villa	PFP	Majority	September 3, 1959 (age 67)	Businessman Governor of Siquijor	June 30, 2022
Sorsogon–1st		Dette Escudero	NPC	Majority	May 7, 1978 (age 48)		June 30, 2022
Sorsogon–2nd		Wowo Fortes	NPC	Majority	February 24, 1965 (age 61)	Lawyer Vice Governor of Sorsogon Mayor of Barcelona	June 30, 2022
South Cotabato–1st		Ed Lumayag	PFP	Majority	May 15, 1954 (age 72)	Mayor of Polomolok	June 30, 2022
South Cotabato–2nd		Dinand Hernandez	PFP	Majority	September 12, 1966 (age 60)	Lawyer House of Representatives	June 30, 2025
South Cotabato–3rd		Dibu Tuan	Lakas	Majority	October 25, 1971 (age 55)	Businessman	June 30, 2025
Southern Leyte–1st		Roger Mercado	PFP	Majority	August 29, 1951 (age 75)	Lawyer Secretary of Public Works and Highways House of Representatives Governor of Southern Leyte	June 30, 2025
Southern Leyte–2nd		Christopherson Yap	NUP	Majority	November 26, 1981 (age 44)	Vice Governor of Southern Leyte	June 30, 2022
Sultan Kudarat–1st		Ruth Sakaluran	Lakas	Majority	September 12, 1963 (age 63)	Businesswoman	June 30, 2025
Sultan Kudarat–2nd		Bella Suansing	PFP	Majority	June 4, 1996 (age 30)	Businesswoman	June 30, 2025
Sulu–1st		Samier Tan	Lakas	Majority	March 3, 1982 (age 44)	Mayor of Maimbung	June 30, 2019
Sulu–2nd		Abdulmunir Arbison	Lakas	Majority	November 12, 1957 (age 69)	Businessman House of Representatives	June 30, 2025
Surigao del Norte–1st		Francisco Matugas	PFP	Majority	May 10, 1942 (age 84)	Lawyer Governor of Surigao del Norte House of Representatives	June 30, 2025
Surigao del Norte–2nd		Bernadette Barbers	Nacionalista	Majority	September 16, 1970 (age 56)	Entrepreneur	June 30, 2025
Surigao del Sur–1st		Romeo Momo	Nacionalista	Majority	August 6, 1952 (age 74)	Civil engineer Department of Public Works and Highways Undersecretary	June 30, 2022
Surigao del Sur–2nd		Alexander Pimentel	PFP	Majority	July 9, 1953 (age 73)	Governor of Surigao del Sur Mayor of Tandag	June 30, 2025
Taguig–Pateros–1st		Ading Cruz	Nacionalista	Majority	September 7, 1959 (age 67)	Agriculturist Vice Mayor of Taguig Taguig Municipal Council	June 30, 2022
Taguig–Pateros–2nd		Jorge Daniel Bocobo	Nacionalista	Majority	August 8, 1974 (age 52)	Taguig Association of Barangay Captains President	June 30, 2025
Tarlac–1st		Jaime Cojuangco	NPC	Majority	April 12, 1997 (age 29)	Entrepreneur	June 30, 2022
Tarlac–2nd		Cristy Angeles	PFP	Majority	November 29, 1959 (age 66)	Mayor of Tarlac City	June 30, 2025
Tarlac–3rd		Bong Rivera	NPC	Majority	August 27, 1968 (age 58)	Businessman	June 30, 2022
Tawi-Tawi at-large		Dimszar Sali	NUP	Majority	October 6, 1986 (age 40)		June 30, 2022
Valenzuela–1st		Kenneth Gatchalian	NPC	Majority	January 12, 1976 (age 50)	Businessman	June 30, 2025
Valenzuela–2nd		Gerald Galang	Lakas	Majority	February 16, 1993 (age 33)	Valenzuela City Council	June 30, 2025
Zambales–1st		Jay Khonghun	Lakas	Majority	June 26, 1977 (age 49)	Vice Governor of Zambales Mayor of Subic Zambales Provincial Board	June 30, 2022
Zambales–2nd		Doris Maniquiz	Lakas	Majority	October 20, 1964 (age 62)	Mayor of Botolan	June 30, 2022
Zamboanga City–1st		Kat Chua	PFP	Majority	April 11, 1992 (age 34)	Real estate broker	June 30, 2025
Zamboanga City–2nd		Jerry Perez	NUP (Note: Elected in 2025 under the Adelante Zamboanga Party.)	Majority	July 9, 1971 (age 55)	Zamboanga City Association of Barangay Captains President	June 30, 2025
Zamboanga del Norte–1st		Pinpin Uy	Lakas	Majority	August 29, 1978 (age 48)	Mayor of Polanco	November 13, 2023
Zamboanga del Norte–2nd		Irene Labadlabad	Lakas	Majority	October 4, 1993 (age 33)	Businesswoman	June 30, 2025
Zamboanga del Norte–3rd		Ian Amatong	Liberal	Majority	April 20, 1978 (age 48)	Publisher House of Representatives staff	June 30, 2022
Zamboanga del Sur–1st		Joseph Yu	Lakas	Majority	August 20, 1998 (age 28)	Businessman	June 30, 2025
Zamboanga del Sur–2nd		Victoria Yu	Lakas	Majority	September 5, 1996 (age 30)		June 30, 2022
Zamboanga Sibugay–1st		Marlo Bancoro	PFP	Majority	September 25, 1974 (age 52)	Lawyer Businessman Zamboanga Sibugay Provincial Board	June 30, 2025
Zamboanga Sibugay–2nd		Marly Hofer–Hasim	PFP	Majority	March 18, 1974 (age 52)	Physician	June 30, 2025
Party-list		Rodge Gutierrez	1-Rider	Majority	October 6, 1993 (age 33)	Lawyer	June 30, 2022
Party-list		Elmer Catulpos	1Tahanan	Majority	April 15, 1976 (age 50)	Businessman	June 3, 2026
Party-list		Iris Marie Montes	4K	Minority	April 27, 1971 (age 55)	Government employee	June 30, 2025
Party-list		Marcelino Libanan	4Ps	Minority	September 20, 1963 (age 63)	Commissioner of the Bureau of Immigration; House of Representatives; Vice Governor of Eastern Samar	June 30, 2022
Party-list		Jonathan Clement Abalos	4Ps	Minority	March 18, 1994 (age 32)		June 30, 2022
Party-list		Maximo Rodriguez Jr.	Abamin	Majority	January 9, 1958 (age 68)	Government employee	June 30, 2025
Party-list		Manuel Frederick Ko	Abang Lingkod	Majority	August 10, 1966 (age 60)	Businessman Negros Occidental Provincial Board	June 30, 2025
Party-list		Robert Raymond Estrella	Abono	Majority	September 2, 1962 (age 64)	House of Representatives	October 2, 2025
Party-list		Antonio Tinio	ACT Teachers	Minority	April 19, 1970 (age 56)	Consultant House of Representatives	June 30, 2025
Party-list		Jocelyn Tulfo	ACT-CIS	Majority	February 5, 1961 (age 65)		June 30, 2019
Party-list		Jeffrey Soriano	ACT-CIS	Majority	August 22, 1980 (age 46)	Businessman	March 11, 2026
Party-list		Nicanor Briones	AGAP	Majority	September 23, 1959 (age 67)	Farmer Businessman House of Representatives	June 30, 2022
Party-list		Bryan Revilla	Agimat	Majority	November 22, 1986 (age 39)		June 30, 2022
Party-list		Chel Diokno	Akbayan	Minority	February 23, 1961 (age 65)	Lawyer	June 30, 2025
Party-list		Perci Cendaña	Akbayan	Minority	September 6, 1976 (age 50)	National Youth Commission	September 25, 2024
Party-list		Dadah Kiram Ismula	Akbayan	Minority	February 26, 1985 (age 41)	Private resort manager	June 30, 2025
Party-list		Alfredo Garbin	Ako Bicol	Majority	October 3, 1976 (age 50)	Lawyer Mayor of Legazpi House of Representatives	June 30, 2025
Party-list		Jan Franz Chan	Ako Bicol	Majority	January 24, 1991 (age 35)	Lawyer	January 26, 2026
Party-list		Sonny Lagon	Ako Bisaya	Majority	February 2, 1969 (age 57)	Engineer	June 30, 2019
Party-list		Richelle Singson-Michael	Ako Ilocano Ako	Majority	November 10, 1981 (age 45)	Architect	June 30, 2022
Party-list		Maria Cristina Lopez	ALONA	Majority	October 15, 1979 (age 47)	Businesswoman	June 30, 2025
Party-list		Alfred delos Santos	Ang Probinsyano	Majority	December 18, 1991 (age 34)	House of Representatives	October 2, 2025
Party-list		Sergio Dagooc	APEC	Minority	April 11, 1961 (age 65)	Dinagat Island Electric Cooperative General Manager	June 30, 2019
Party-list		Henry Oaminal Jr.	Asenso Pinoy	Majority	January 19, 1992 (age 34)	Lawyer	June 30, 2025
Party-list		Roberto Nazal Jr.	BH	Minority	June 25, 1973 (age 53)	Businessman House of Representatives	June 30, 2025
Party-list		Terry Ridon	Bicol Saro	Minority	January 13, 1986 (age 40)	Lawyer House of Representatives	June 30, 2025
Party-list		Eddie Villanueva	CIBAC	Majority	October 6, 1946 (age 80)	Educator Evangelist	June 30, 2019
Party-list		Felimon Espares	Coop-NATCCO	Majority	August 3, 1965 (age 61)		June 30, 2022
Party-list		Edwin Gardiola	CWS	Majority	September 24, 1959 (age 67)	Civil engineer Businessman	June 30, 2022
Party-list		Claudine Bautista-Lim	DUMPER PTDA	Majority	December 2, 1985 (age 40)	Davao del Sur Sangguniang Kabataan Federation President	June 30, 2019
Party-list		Brian Poe Llamanzares	FPJ Panday Bayanihan	Majority	April 16, 1992 (age 34)	Businessman	June 30, 2025
Party-list		Sarah Elago	Gabriela	Minority	October 18, 1989 (age 37)	Activist House of Representatives	September 23, 2025 (Note: Sarah Elago took office on September 23, 2025, after the Commission on Elections allocated one additional seat for party-list representatives.)
Party-list		Jan Rurik Padiernos	GP	Majority	January 16, 1990 (age 36)	Lawyer Commission on Appointments staff	June 30, 2025
Party-list		Renee Co	Kabataan	Minority	November 3, 1997 (age 29)	Lawyer	June 30, 2025
Party-list		Caroline Tanchay	Kamalayan	Majority	August 30, 1968 (age 58)	Businesswoman	June 30, 2022
Party-list		Eli San Fernando	Kamanggagawa	Minority	August 13, 1996 (age 30)	Union organizer	June 30, 2025
Party-list		Munir Arbison Jr.	KAPUSO PM	Majority	February 27, 1990 (age 36)	Registered nurse	June 30, 2022
Party-list		Kenneth Paolo Tereng	KM Ngayon Na	Majority	October 19, 1993 (age 33)	Civil engineer	June 30, 2025
Party-list		Aiman Tan	Kusug Tausug	Majority	October 16, 1990 (age 36)	Vice Mayor of Maimbung, Sulu	June 30, 2025
Party-list		Allan Ty	LPGMA	Minority	October 9, 1973 (age 53)	Lawyer	June 30, 2019
Party-list		Ferdinand Beltran	MAGBUBUKID	Majority	October 30, 1954 (age 72)	Businessman	June 30, 2025
Party-list		Girlie Veloso	Malasakit@Bayanihan	Majority	September 21, 1976 (age 50)	Supervising legislative officer	June 30, 2025
Party-list		Leila de Lima	ML	Minority	August 27, 1959 (age 67)	Lawyer Senate Secretary of Justice	June 30, 2025
Party-list		Maria Nina Francesca Lacson	Manila Teachers	Majority	October 10, 1989 (age 37)	Organizational special assistant	June 30, 2025
Party-list		Arthur C. Yap	Murang Kuryente	Majority	November 10, 1965 (age 61)	Secretary of Agriculture House of Representatives Governor of Bohol	October 2, 2025
Party-list		Florabel Yatco	Nanay	Majority	September 27, 1972 (age 54)	Restaurant owner Businesswoman	June 30, 2025
Party-list		Maria Kristina Jihan Glepa	ONE COOP	Majority	November 16, 1991 (age 34)	Lawyer	June 30, 2025
Party-list		Presley de Jesus	PHILRECA	Minority	January 3, 1966 (age 60)	Businessman	June 30, 2019
Party-list		Karl Josef Legazpi	Pinoy Workers	Majority	—	National Youth Commission Commissioner-at-Large House of Representatives staff	May 20, 2026
Party-list		Harold Duterte	PPP	Independent	August 7, 1978 (age 48)	Businessman	June 30, 2025
Party-list		Jernie Jett Nisay	Pusong Pinoy	Minority	October 29, 1983 (age 43)	Balanga City Council	June 30, 2022
Party-list		Paolo Marcoleta	SAGIP	Minority	August 15, 1976 (age 50)	Business executive	June 30, 2025
Party-list		Rodolfo Ordanes	Senior Citizens	Majority	December 12, 1952 (age 73)	Government employee	June 30, 2022
Party-list		Ching Bernos	Solid North	Majority	August 30, 1978 (age 48)	Mayor of La Paz Vice Mayor of La Paz	June 30, 2022
Party-list		Rolando Macasaet	SSS-GSIS Pensyonado	Majority	July 14, 1960 (age 66)	President and CEO of the Social Security System President of the Government Service Insurance System	June 30, 2025
Party-list		Arlyn Ayon	SWERTE	Majority	August 10, 1969 (age 57)	Business owner Entrepreneur Bukidnon Provincial Board	June 30, 2025
Party-list		Jose Teves Jr.	TGP	Majority	August 1, 1963 (age 63)	Mechanical engineer Vice Governor of Catanduanes Mayor of Baras	June 30, 2019
Party-list		Andrew Julian Romualdez	Tingog	Majority	February 21, 2000 (age 26)	Businessman	June 30, 2025
Party-list		Jude Acidre	Tingog	Majority	October 13, 1982 (age 44)	Policy analyst	June 30, 2025
Party-list		Yedda Romualdez	Tingog	Majority	August 14, 1981 (age 45)	Registered nurse House of Representatives	July 16, 2025
Party-list		Johanne Monich Bautista	TRABAHO	Majority	September 14, 1991 (age 35)	Lawyer	June 30, 2025
Party-list		Raymond Mendoza	TUCP	Majority	July 7, 1962 (age 64)	Trade union leader Lawyer House of Representatives	October 5, 2016
Party-list		Milagros Aquino-Magsaysay	United Senior Citizens	Majority	November 27, 1946 (age 79)	House of Representatives	November 7, 2022
Party-list		Jojo Ang	Uswag Ilonggo	Majority	December 29, 1975 (age 50)		June 30, 2022

== See also ==
- List of current senators of the Philippines
- List of Philippine House of Representatives committees
- Congressional districts of the Philippines
