= List of current senators of the Philippines =

The 24 members of the Senate of the Philippines, the upper house of the Congress of the Philippines, as mandated by the 1987 Constitution, are elected at-large every six years.

The following is a list of all senators serving in the 20th Congress of the Philippines beginning June 30, 2025.

== Composition ==
Senate composition by party NPC Nacionalista PDP Akbayan KNP Lakas Liberal PMP Independent

=== Current composition by party ===
| Party | Seats |
|---|---|
| NPC | 6 |
| Nacionalista | 4 |
| PDP | 3 |
| Akbayan | 1 |
| KANP | 1 |
| Lakas | 1 |
| Liberal | 1 |
| PMP | 1 |
| Independent | 6 |
| Total | 24 |

=== Current composition by bloc ===
| Party | Bloc | |
| Party | Majority | Minority |
|---|---|---|
| NPC | 5 | 1 |
| Nacionalista | 1 | 3 |
| Akbayan | 1 | 0 |
| KANP | 1 | 0 |
| Lakas | 1 | 0 |
| Liberal | 1 | 0 |
| PDP | 0 | 3 |
| PMP | 0 | 1 |
| Independent | 4 | 2 |
| Total | 14 | 10 |

== Leadership ==
=== Presiding officers ===
| Office | Officer | | Since |
|---|---|---|---|
| President of the Senate | Sherwin Gatchalian | NPC | June 17, 2026 |
| President pro tempore | Tito Sotto | NPC | June 17, 2026 |

=== Majority leadership ===
| Office | Officer | | Since |
|---|---|---|---|
| Senate Majority Leader | Juan Miguel Zubiri | Independent | June 3, 2026 |
| Senior Deputy Majority Leader | JV Ejercito | NPC | June 17, 2026 |
| Deputy Majority Leader | Joel Villanueva | Independent | June 17, 2026 |

=== Minority leadership ===
| Office | Officer | | Since |
|---|---|---|---|
| Senate Minority Leader | Alan Peter Cayetano | Independent | June 17, 2026 |
| Deputy Minority Leader | Imee Marcos | Nacionalista | July 29, 2026 |

== List of senators ==
| Portrait | Senator | Party | Bloc | Born | Occupation(s) | Previous elective office(s) | Education | Took office | Term ending | Term |
|---|---|---|---|---|---|---|---|---|---|---|
| | Bam Aquino | KANP | Majority | May 7, 1977 (age 49) | Social entrepreneur Television host | None | Ateneo de Manila University (BS) Harvard Kennedy School | June 30, 2025 | June 30, 2031 | 1 |
| | Alan Peter Cayetano | Independent | Minority | October 28, 1970 (age 55) | Lawyer Diplomat | Sangguniang Bayan of Taguig Vice Mayor of Taguig Representative from Taguig–Pateros's 1st District | University of the Philippines Diliman (BA) Ateneo de Manila University (JD) | June 30, 2022 | June 30, 2028 | 1 |
| | Pia Cayetano | Nacionalista | Minority | March 22, 1966 (age 60) | Lawyer Economist Athlete Television host | Representative from Taguig's 2nd District | University of the Philippines Diliman (BA, LLB) | June 30, 2025 | June 30, 2031 | 2 |
| | Ronald dela Rosa | PDP | Minority | January 21, 1962 (age 64) | Retired PNP Chief Retired BuCor Director-General | None | Mindanao State University (BS) Philippine Military Academy University of Southeastern Philippines (MPA, PhD) | June 30, 2025 | June 30, 2031 | 2 |
| | JV Ejercito | NPC | Majority | December 26, 1969 (age 56) | Businessman | Mayor of San Juan Representative from San Juan's Lone District | De La Salle University (BA) | June 30, 2022 | June 30, 2028 | 1 |
| | Francis Escudero | NPC | Majority | October 10, 1969 (age 56) | Lawyer | Representative from Sorsogon's 1st District Governor of Sorsogon | University of the Philippines Diliman (BA, LLB) | June 30, 2022 | June 30, 2028 | 1 |
| | Jinggoy Estrada | PMP | Minority | February 17, 1963 (age 63) | Film actor | Vice Mayor of San Juan Mayor of San Juan | University of the Philippines Manila (BA) Lyceum of the Philippines University (LLB) | June 30, 2022 | June 30, 2028 | 1 |
| | Win Gatchalian | NPC | Majority | April 26, 1974 (age 52) | Businessman | Representative from Valenzuela's 1st District Mayor of Valenzuela | Boston University | June 30, 2022 | June 30, 2028 | 2 |
| | Bong Go | PDP | Minority | June 14, 1974 (age 52) | Special Assistant to the President | None | Ateneo de Davao University (BS) | June 30, 2025 | June 30, 2031 | 2 |
| | Risa Hontiveros | Akbayan | Majority | February 24, 1966 (age 60) | Journalist News anchor Professor | Representative for Akbayan | Ateneo de Manila University (BA) | June 30, 2022 | June 30, 2028 | 2 |
| | Panfilo Lacson | Independent | Majority | June 1, 1948 (age 78) | Retired PNP Chief | None | Philippine Military Academy Pamantasan ng Lungsod ng Maynila (MGM) | June 30, 2025 | June 30, 2031 | 1 |
| | Lito Lapid | NPC | Majority | October 25, 1955 (age 70) | Actor Director | Vice Governor of Pampanga Governor of Pampanga | St. Catherine's Academy (secondary) | June 30, 2025 | June 30, 2031 | 2 |
| | Loren Legarda | NPC | Minority | January 28, 1960 (age 66) | Environmentalist Cultural worker Journalist | Representative from Antique's Lone District | University of the Philippines Diliman (BA) University of California | June 30, 2022 | June 30, 2028 | 1 |
| | Rodante Marcoleta | Independent | Minority | July 29, 1953 (age 73) | Lawyer Television host | Representative for Alagad Party-list Representative for SAGIP Partylist | University of the East (MBA) University of the Philippines Diliman (DPA) | June 30, 2025 | June 30, 2031 | 1 |
| | Imee Marcos | Nacionalista | Minority | November 12, 1955 (age 70) | Film producer | MP from Ilocos Norte's Lone District Representative from Ilocos Norte's 2nd District Governor of Ilocos Norte | Princeton University (dropped out) University of the Philippines Diliman (no degree) | June 30, 2025 | June 30, 2031 | 2 |
| | Robin Padilla | PDP | Minority | November 23, 1969 (age 56) | Actor Film director | None | Philippine College of Criminology | June 30, 2022 | June 30, 2028 | 1 |
| | Kiko Pangilinan | Liberal | Majority | August 24, 1963 (age 63) | Lawyer Farm owner Law lecturer | Council Member of Quezon City's 4th District | University of the Philippines Diliman (BA, LLB) | June 30, 2025 | June 30, 2031 | 1 |
| | Tito Sotto | NPC | Majority | August 24, 1948 (age 78) | Television host Songwriter Record producer | Vice Mayor of Quezon City | Colegio de San Juan de Letran (BA) | June 30, 2025 | June 30, 2031 | 1 |
| | Erwin Tulfo | Lakas | Majority | August 10, 1964 (age 62) | News anchor Columnist | Representative for ACT-CIS | University of the East (BS) | June 30, 2025 | June 30, 2031 | 1 |
| | Raffy Tulfo | Independent | Majority | March 12, 1960 (age 66) | Broadcast journalist | None | – (Note: Tulfo attended several universities over a span of four years, studying majors such as economics, political science, agribusiness, and commerce. However, he did not complete a degree before starting his career in journalism.) | June 30, 2022 | June 30, 2028 | 1 |
| | Joel Villanueva | Independent | Majority | August 2, 1975 (age 51) | TESDA Director General | Representative for CIBAC | University of Santo Tomas (BS) Harvard University (MBA) | June 30, 2022 | June 30, 2028 | 2 |
| | Camille Villar | Nacionalista | Minority | January 25, 1985 (age 41) | Businesswoman Television host | Representative from Las Piñas's Lone District | Ateneo de Manila University IESE Business School (MBA) | June 30, 2025 | June 30, 2031 | 1 |
| | Mark Villar | Nacionalista | Majority | August 14, 1978 (age 48) | Businessman | Representative from Las Piñas's Lone District | University of Pennsylvania University of Chicago Booth School of Business (MBA) | June 30, 2022 | June 30, 2028 | 1 |
| | Juan Miguel Zubiri | Independent | Majority | April 13, 1969 (age 57) | Martial artist | Representative from Bukidnon's 3rd District | University of the Philippines Los Baños (BS) University of the Philippines Open University (MENRM) | June 30, 2022 | June 30, 2028 | 2 |

== See also ==
- List of longest-serving senators of the Philippines
- List of current members of the House of Representatives of the Philippines
- List of Philippine Senate committees
