= Jhong Ceniza =

Filipino politician (born 1979)

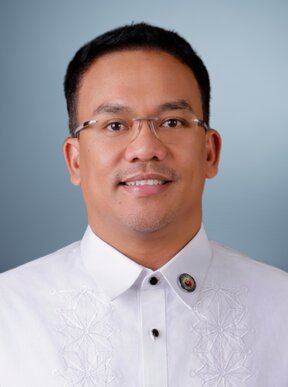
- Official portrait, 2025

Member of the Philippine House of Representatives of the Davao de Oro's 2nd congressional district
- Incumbent
- Assumed office June 30, 2025
- Preceded by: Ruwel Peter Gonzaga

Mayor of Pantukan, Davao de Oro
- In office June 30, 2022 – June 30, 2025
- Vice Mayor: Mating Arancon
- Preceded by: Roberto Yugo
- Succeeded by: Oliver D. Ceniza

Personal details
- Born: December 23, 1979 (age 46) Pantukan, Davao
- Party: Lakas (2025–present)
- Other political affiliations: Independent (2024–2025); PDP (2021–2024)
- Spouse: Jella Pahati Ceniza
- Occupation: Politician
- Nickname: Jhong

Leonel "Jhong" Domo-ong Ceniza (born December 23, 1979) is a Filipino politician currently serving as the representative of Davao de Oro's 2nd congressional district since 2025. He previously served as mayor of Pantukan, Davao de Oro, from 2022 to 2025.

Ceniza supported the second impeachment of Vice President Sara Duterte in 2026, and was one of five congressmen from Davao Region to vote in favor of impeachment.

== Early life ==
Ceniza was born on December 23, 1979 in Pantukan, Davao.

== Political career ==
Ceniza was elected mayor of Pantukan, Davao de Oro in 2022 under PDP-Laban, defeating Hugpong ng Pagbabago candidate Chino Sarenas and Reform PH Party candidate Rasad Sawat. Ceniza served as mayor from 2022 to 2025.

In the 2025 elections, Ceniza ran as an independent candidate for representative of the 2nd district of Davao de Oro and won, defeating Partido Federal ng Pilipinas candidate Butchoy Taojo. Two weeks prior to taking office, he became a member of the Lakas party under the leadership of Rep. Martin Romualdez. Ceniza and Davao del Norte's 1st District Representative De Carlo Uy were later appointed as the Assistant Majority Floor Leader of the House on July 28, 2025.

In May 2026, Ceniza voted "yes" to the second impeachment of Vice President Sara Duterte, becoming one of five representatives from Davao Region to vote in favor of impeachment.

== Personal life ==
Ceniza is married to Jella Pahati Ceniza.
