= Puwersa ng Pilipinong Pandagat =

Philippine sectoral organization representing fisherfolks

- — Philippine partylist —
- Abbreviation: PPP
- President: Roy Ryan A. Rigor II
- Sector(s) represented: Fisherfolk
- Founded: December 20, 2019; 6 years ago
- COMELEC accreditation: November 30, 2023; 2 years ago
- Headquarters: Davao City
- Ideology: Dutertismo
- Colors: Red, Blue
- Slogan: Ato ni Bai

Current representation (20th Congress)
- Seats in the House of Representatives: 1 / 3 (Out of 63 party-list seats)
- Representative(s): Harold Duterte

Website
- www.pwersangpilipinongpandagat.com

Puwersa ng Pilipinong Pandagat (PPP; lit. 'Filipino maritime force') is a political organization seeking party-list representation in the House of Representatives of the Philippines. The seek to represent the interest of fisherfolks and is aligned with the Duterte family.

== History ==
Puwersa ng Pilipinong Pandagat was established as an advocacy group on December 20, 2019 in Davao City as a response to the 2019 Davao del Sur earthquake. It was founded by a group led by Roy Ryan II A. Rigor, PPP's eventual president. PPP was then granted accreditation by the Commission on Election as a sectoral organization on November 30, 2023.

PPP contested at the 2025 election. Naming fisherfolks as the sector they represent, PPP are backed by the Duterte political family including former president Rodrigo Duterte and vice president Sara Duterte. The first nominee is Harold Duterte, a cousin of Sara Matthew Bryan Lim, the second nominee is an ally of Paolo Duterte.

== Electoral performance ==
Election	Votes	%	Seats
2025	575,762	1.37	1 / 63

== Representatives to Congress ==
Period	Representative
20th Congress; 2025–2028	Harold Duterte
Note: A party-list group, can win a maximum of three seats in the House of Representatives.
