= Harold Duterte =

Filipino politician

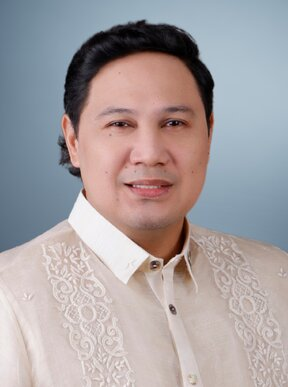
- Official portrait, 2025

Member of the House of Representatives of the Philippines for Puwersa ng Pilipinong Pandagat
- Incumbent
- Assumed office June 30, 2025

Personal details
- Born: Harold James Tapangan Duterte; August 7, 1978 (age 48)
- Party: PPP (partylist; 2024–present)
- Relations: Duterte family
- Occupation: Politician, Businessman

Harold James Tapangan Duterte (born August 7, 1978) is a Filipino politician and businessman who serves as representative of the Puwersa ng Pilipinong Pandagat (PPP) Party-list since 2025.

== Political career ==
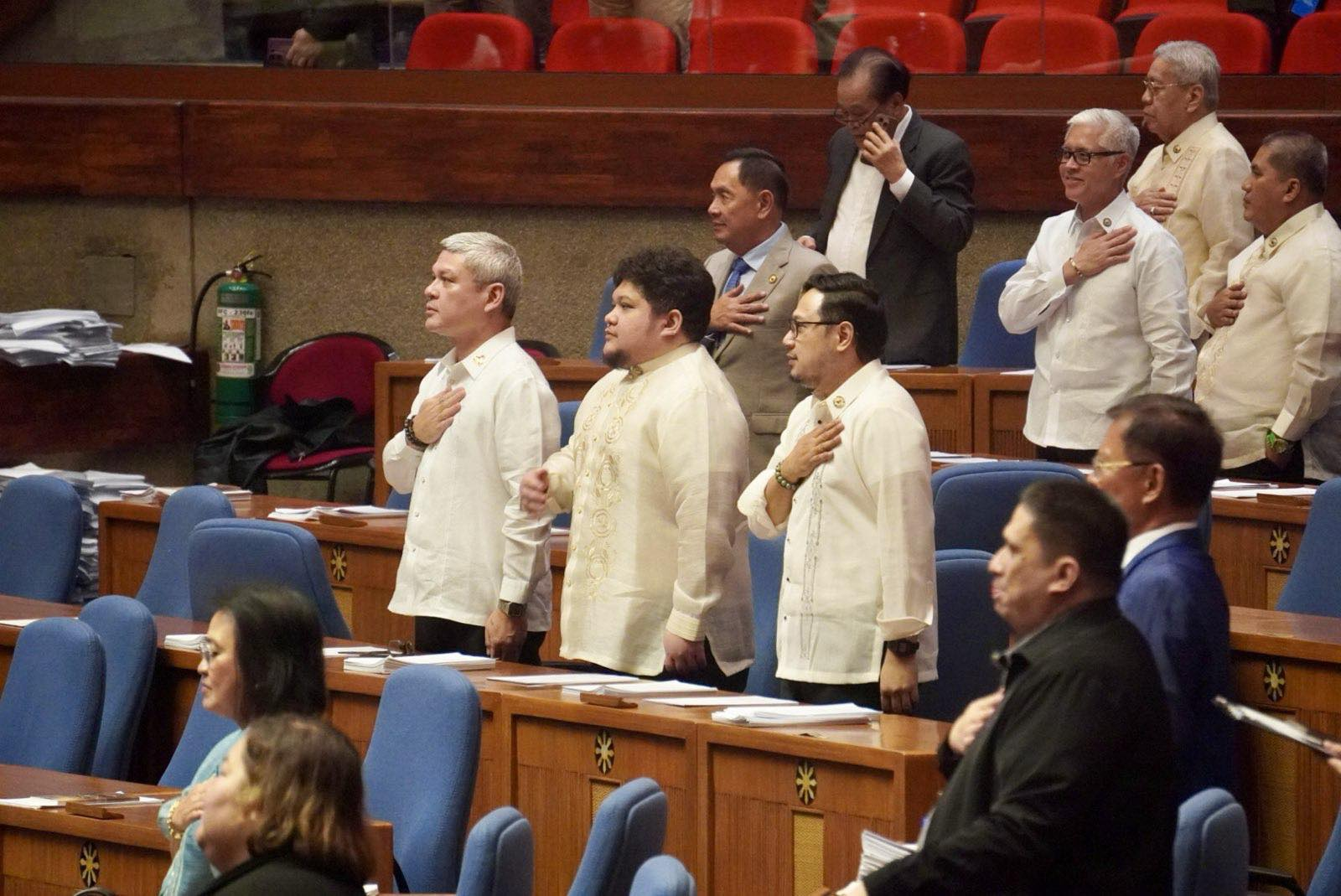
Harold Duterte (right) during regular session

In the 2025 Philippine House of Representatives elections, PPP secured one seat in the House of Representatives for Duterte. Upon the opening of the 20th Congress, he became part of the independent Davao-based bloc alongside Davao City representatives Paolo Duterte, Omar Duterte, and Isidro Ungab.

== Personal life ==
Duterte is a cousin of Vice President Sara Duterte, Davao City Representative Paolo Duterte, and Davao City Mayor Sebastian Duterte.
