= Rolando Macasaet =

Filipino businessman and politician (born 1960)

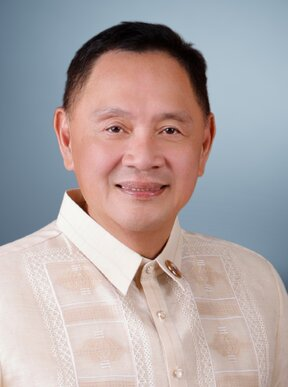
- Official portrait, 2025

Member of the Philippine House of Representatives for SSS-GSIS Pensyonado
- Incumbent
- Assumed office June 30, 2025

Personal details
- Born: Rolando Ledesma Macasaet; July 14, 1960 (age 66) Zamboanga City, Philippines
- Spouse: Cristina Yap
- Relations: Susan Yap (sister-in-law); Victor Yap (brother-in-law); Jose Yap (father-in-law)
- Children: Emilio Yap Macasaet
- Education: University of the Philippines

Rolando Ledesma Macasaet (born July 14, 1960) is a Filipino business executive and government official. He was president and chief executive officer of the Social Security System (SSS) from 2023 to 2024.

== Early life and education ==
Rolando Ledesma Macasaet was born on July 14, 1960 in Zamboanga City He studied at the Ateneo de Zamboanga University for high school, graduating in 1977. He finished a bachelor's degree in business economics degree at the University of the Philippines and a master's degree in business administration from the same institution.

He also has an academic background rooted in the United States, having finished an executive program in finance at the Columbia University and a diploma in management at Harvard Business School.

== Career ==
=== Early years ===
Macasaet has worked for various finance firms such as the Bank of Montreal, Asian Infrastructure Development Bank in Beijing and the Philippine National Bank.

From 1988 to 2005, he has also worked in various government-owned and controlled corporations (GOCCs) or state-owned firms such as the Philippine National Construction Corporation, Dasmariñas Industrial Steel Corporation, Skyway Corporation, and Tierra Factors Corporation. He was also a board member of companies such as San Miguel Corporation, Bank of Commerce, Private Infrastructure and Development Corporation, and PCI Bank.

=== Government Service Insurance System ===
Macasaet headed the Government Service Insurance System (GSIS) during the presidency of Rodrigo Duterte. He joined the GSIS in June 2018 after former GSIS president Francisco Duque was appointed as health secretary. Macasaet became Officer in Charge of the GSIS in July 4, 2019. He was made acting president and general manager in July 30, 2019. He was confirmed to the role by Duterte on September 4.

=== Social Security System ===
Macasaet was appointed as president and chief executive officer of the Social Security System (SSS) by president Bongbong Marcos on January 5, 2023. He is credited for registering 3 million people in the SSS from January and September 2024, which is an increase from the typical annual registration of 1 million. He initiated the KaSSSangga Collect Program and MySSS Pension Booster projects. He resigned on October 6, 2024. SSS commissioner Robert Joseph de Claro took over under the capacity of Officer in Charge.

=== SSS-GSIS Pensyonado ===
Macasaet resigned from his role under the SSS after the SSS-GSIS Pensyonado Partylist named him as the group's first nominee for the purpose of running as a party-list in the 2025 election. SSS-GSIS won a seat.
