= Davao de Oro's 2nd congressional district =

Legislative district of the Philippines

- Constituency for the House of Representatives of the Philippines
- Location of Davao de Oro within the Philippines
- Province: Davao de Oro
- Region: Davao Region
- Population: 421,290 (2020)
- Electorate: 274,870 (2022)
- Major settlements: 6 LGUs: Municipalities; Laak; Mabini; Maco; Mawab; Nabunturan; Pantukan
- Area: 2,410.74 km^{2} (930.79 sq mi)

Current constituency
- Created: 1998
- Representative: Jhong Ceniza
- Political party: Lakas–CMD
- Congressional bloc: Majority

Davao de Oro's 2nd congressional district is a congressional district for the House of Representatives of the Philippines in the province of Davao de Oro, formerly Compostela Valley. It was created ahead of the 1998 Philippine House of Representatives elections by Republic Act No. 8470 that established the province initially named Compostela Valley. The district encompasses two noncontiguous areas of Davao de Oro: Laak in the Davao–Agusan Trough and the valley and coastal municipalities adjoining the provincial capital of Nabunturan, namely Mabini, Maco, Mawab and Pantukan. Much of these areas were previously within Davao del Norte's 2nd district. Jhong Ceniza of the Lakas–CMD, currently serves as this district's representative in the 20th Congress, the first under the province's new name of Davao de Oro.

== Representation history ==
#	Image	Member	Term of office		Congress	Party	Electoral history	Constituent LGUs
#	Image	Member	Start	End	Congress	Party	Electoral history	Constituent LGUs
=== Compostela Valley's 2nd district for the House of Representatives of the Philippines ===
District created January 30, 1998. Redistricted from Davao del Norte's 2nd district.
1		Prospero Amatong	June 30, 1998	June 30, 2007	11th	Lakas	Elected in 1998.	1998–2019; Laak, Mabini, Maco, Mawab, Nabunturan, Pantukan
1		Prospero Amatong	June 30, 1998	June 30, 2007	12th	Lakas	Re-elected in 2001.	1998–2019; Laak, Mabini, Maco, Mawab, Nabunturan, Pantukan
1		Prospero Amatong	June 30, 1998	June 30, 2007	13th	Lakas	Re-elected in 2004.	1998–2019; Laak, Mabini, Maco, Mawab, Nabunturan, Pantukan
2		Rommel Amatong	June 30, 2007	June 30, 2016	14th	Lakas	Elected in 2007.	1998–2019; Laak, Mabini, Maco, Mawab, Nabunturan, Pantukan
2		Rommel Amatong	June 30, 2007	June 30, 2016	15th	Lakas	Re-elected in 2010.	1998–2019; Laak, Mabini, Maco, Mawab, Nabunturan, Pantukan
2		Rommel Amatong	June 30, 2007	June 30, 2016	16th	Aksyon	Re-elected in 2013.	1998–2019; Laak, Mabini, Maco, Mawab, Nabunturan, Pantukan
3		Ruwel Peter S. Gonzaga	June 30, 2016	June 30, 2019	17th	PDP–Laban	Elected in 2016.	1998–2019; Laak, Mabini, Maco, Mawab, Nabunturan, Pantukan
=== Davao de Oro's 2nd district for the House of Representatives of the Philippines ===
(3)		Ruwel Peter S. Gonzaga	June 30, 2019	June 30, 2025	18th	PDP–Laban	Re-elected in 2019.	2019–present Laak, Mabini, Maco, Mawab, Nabunturan, Pantukan
(3)		Ruwel Peter S. Gonzaga	June 30, 2019	June 30, 2025	19th	PFP	Re-elected in 2022.	2019–present Laak, Mabini, Maco, Mawab, Nabunturan, Pantukan
4		Jhong Ceniza	June 30, 2025	Incumbent	20th	Independent	Elected in 2025.	2019–present Laak, Mabini, Maco, Mawab, Nabunturan, Pantukan
4		Jhong Ceniza	June 30, 2025	Incumbent	20th	Lakas	Elected in 2025.	2019–present Laak, Mabini, Maco, Mawab, Nabunturan, Pantukan

== Election results ==
=== 2025 ===
Candidate	Party	Votes	%
Jhong Ceniza	Independent	148,478	56.39
Butchoy Taojo	Partido Federal ng Pilipinas	114,816	43.61
Total		263,294	100.00
Registered voters/turnout		302,566	–
Independent gain from Partido Federal ng Pilipinas			
Source: Commission on Elections

=== 2022 ===
2022 Philippine House of Representatives elections
Party	Candidate	Votes	%
PDP–Laban	Ruwel Peter Gonzaga (incumbent)	136,379	
Hugpong	Joecab Caballero	89,388	
Total votes			100.00
PDP–Laban hold			

=== 2019 ===
2019 Philippine House of Representatives elections
Party	Candidate	Votes	%
PDP–Laban	Ruwel Peter Gonzaga (incumbent)	143,596	100.00
Total votes		143,596	100.00
PDP–Laban hold			

== See also ==
- Legislative districts of Davao de Oro
