= La Paz, Abra =

Municipality in Abra, Philippines

La Paz
- Municipality
- Municipality of La Paz
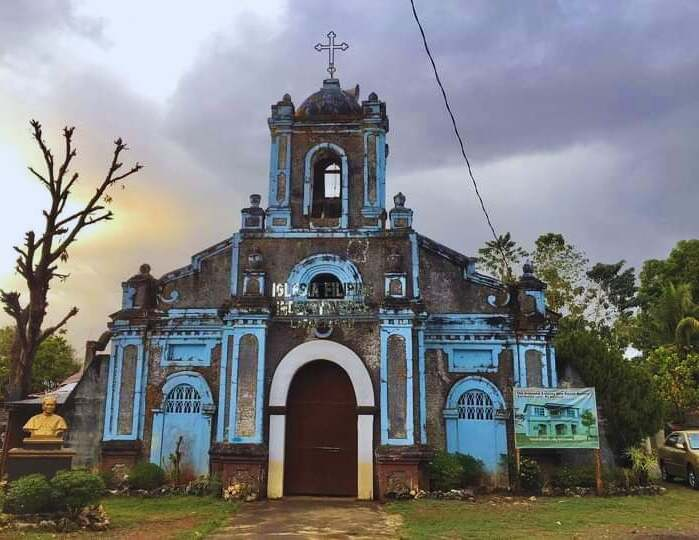
- The Iglesia Filipina Independiente (Philippine Independent Church) Parish of Nuestra Señora de La Paz (Our Lady of Peace), one of the oldest churches in Abra

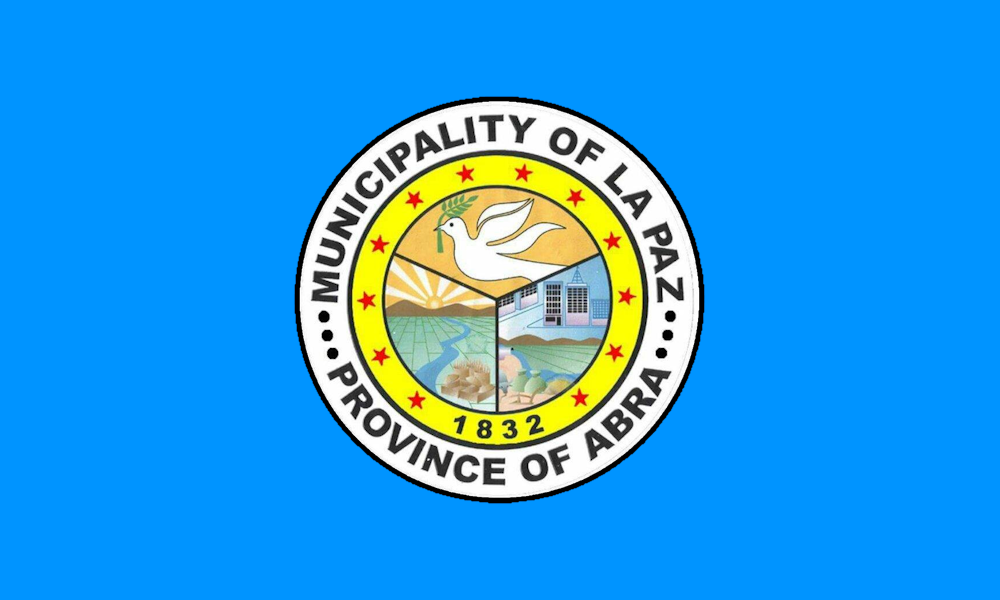
- Flag Seal

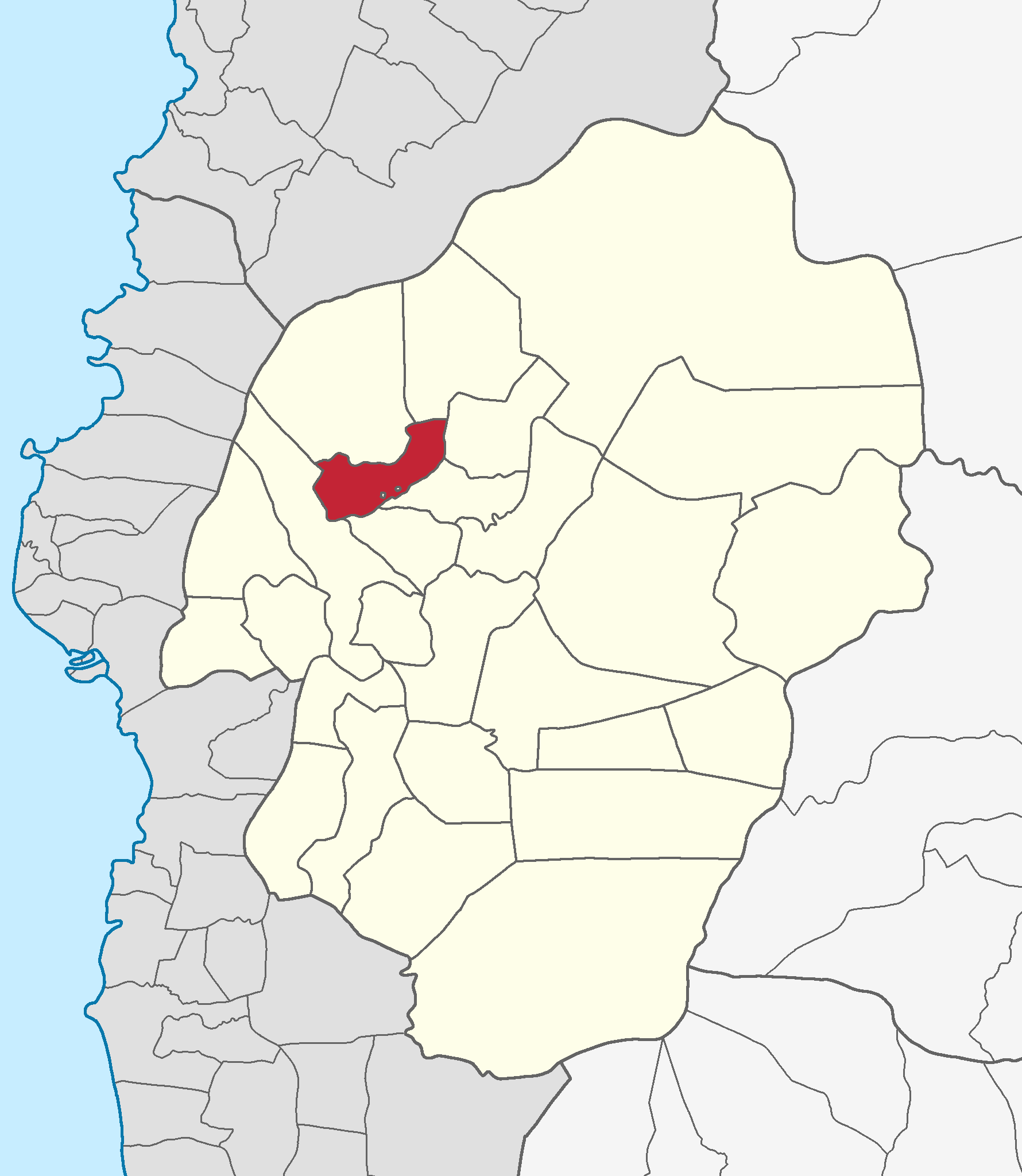
- Map of Abra with La Paz highlighted
- Interactive map of La Paz
- Location within the Philippines
- Coordinates: 17°40′26″N 120°41′05″E
- Country: Philippines
- Region: Cordillera Administrative Region
- Province: Abra
- District: Lone district
- Barangays: 12 (see Barangays)

Government
  - Type: Sangguniang Bayan
  - Mayor: Danielle Belyne B. Bernos
  - Vice Mayor: Julbert B. Timbreza
  - Representative: Joseph Sto. Niño B. Bernos
  - Municipal Council: Members: Benito E. Nono; Up-Jhon C. Palos; Arnulfo B. Biscarra Jr.; Ronnel R. Balaoro; Lino A. Bernos II; Moises Angelo Q. Galinato; Ronald P. Ola; Nicasio P. Turqueza
  - Electorate: 11,500 voters (2025)

Area
  - Total: 51.41 km^{2} (19.85 sq mi)
- Elevation: 210 m (690 ft)
- Highest elevation: 1,088 m (3,570 ft)
- Lowest elevation: 29 m (95 ft)

Population (2024 census)
  - Total: 16,014
  - Density: 311.5/km^{2} (806.8/sq mi)
  - Households: 4,147

Economy
  - Income class: 4th municipal income class
  - Poverty incidence: 12.74% (2023)
  - Revenue: ₱ 151.8 million (2022)
  - Assets: ₱ 332 million (2022)
  - Expenditure: ₱ 135.3 million (2022)
  - Liabilities: ₱ 96.74 million (2022)

Service provider
  - Electricity: Abra Electric Cooperative (ABRECO)
- Time zone: UTC+8 (PST)
- ZIP code: 2826
- PSGC: 1400108000
- IDD : area code: +63 (0)74
- Native languages: Itneg, Ilocano, Filipino

La Paz, officially the Municipality of La Paz (Ilocano: Ili ti La Paz; Filipino: Bayan ng La Paz), is a municipality in the province of Abra, Philippines. According to the 2024 census, it has a population of 16,014 people.

== Geography ==
According to the Philippine Statistics Authority, the municipality has a land area of 51.41 square kilometres (19.85 sq mi) constituting 1.23% of the 4,165.25-square-kilometre- (1,608.21 sq mi) total area of Abra. La Paz is located at 17°40′26″N 120°41′05″E.

La Paz is situated 13.37 kilometres (8.31 mi) from the provincial capital Bangued, and 419.22 kilometres (260.49 mi) from the country's capital city of Manila.

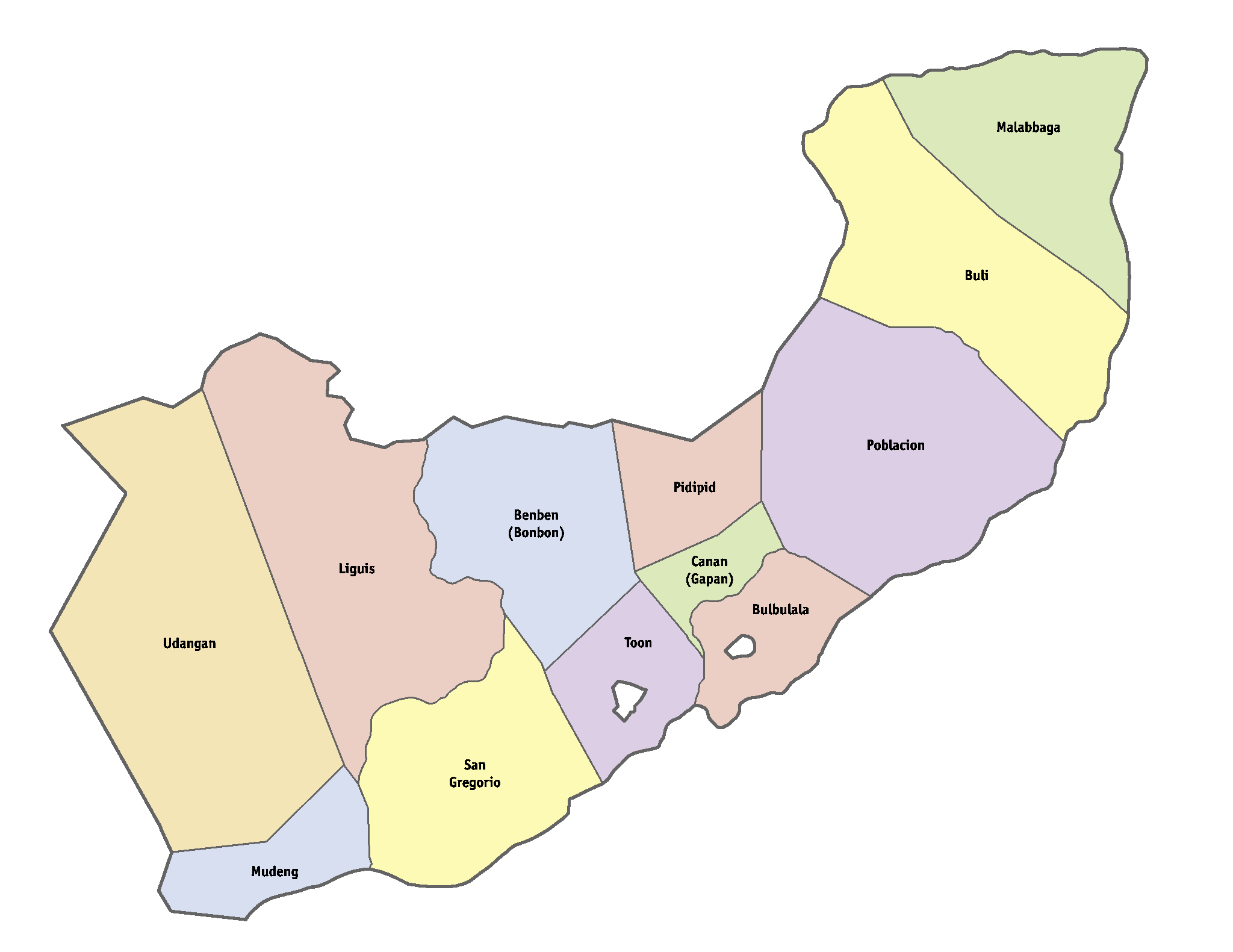
Political map of La Paz

=== Barangays ===
La Paz is politically subdivided into 12 barangays. Each barangay consists of puroks and some have sitios.

PSGC	Barangay	Population			±% p.a.	
		2024		2010		
140108002	Benben (Bonbon)	4.2%	680	551	▴	1.47%
140108003	Bulbulala	9.5%	1,529	1,183	▴	1.79%
140108004	Buli	10.3%	1,642	1,453	▴	0.85%
140108005	Canan (Gapan)	9.6%	1,532	1,155	▴	1.98%
140108006	Liguis	6.4%	1,029	911	▴	0.85%
140108007	Malabbaga	8.9%	1,430	1,243	▴	0.98%
140108008	Mudeng	7.5%	1,208	1,153	▴	0.32%
140108009	Pidipid	5.1%	810	950	▾	−1.10%
140108010	Poblacion	23.0%	3,686	3,687	▾	0.00%
140108011	San Gregorio	9.3%	1,493	1,178	▴	1.66%
140108012	Toon	5.6%	896	928	▾	−0.24%
140108013	Udangan	3.5%	558	490	▴	0.90%
	Total		16,014	16,493	▾	−0.20%

=== Climate ===
Climate data for La Paz, Abra
Month	Jan	Feb	Mar	Apr	May	Jun	Jul	Aug	Sep	Oct	Nov	Dec	Year
Mean daily maximum °C (°F)	29 (84)	30 (86)	32 (90)	33 (91)	32 (90)	31 (88)	30 (86)	29 (84)	30 (86)	30 (86)	30 (86)	29 (84)	30 (87)
Mean daily minimum °C (°F)	18 (64)	19 (66)	20 (68)	22 (72)	24 (75)	24 (75)	24 (75)	24 (75)	23 (73)	22 (72)	20 (68)	19 (66)	22 (71)
Average precipitation mm (inches)	9 (0.4)	11 (0.4)	13 (0.5)	23 (0.9)	92 (3.6)	122 (4.8)	153 (6.0)	137 (5.4)	139 (5.5)	141 (5.6)	42 (1.7)	14 (0.6)	896 (35.4)
Average rainy days	4.6	4.0	6.2	9.1	19.5	23.2	24.0	22.5	21.5	15.2	10.5	6.0	166.3
Source: Meteoblue

== Demographics ==
Population census of La Paz

Year	Pop.	±% p.a.
1903	3,362	—
1918	4,743	+2.32%
1939	5,045	+0.29%
1948	5,444	+0.85%
1960	6,808	+1.88%
1970	8,527	+2.27%
1975	8,529	+0.00%
1980	9,205	+1.54%

Year	Pop.	±% p.a.
1990	11,240	+2.02%
1995	11,756	+0.84%
2000	12,922	+2.05%
2007	14,658	+1.75%
2010	14,882	+0.55%
2015	15,437	+0.70%
2020	16,493	+1.40%
2024	16,014	−0.71%

Source: Philippine Statistics Authority

In the 2024 census, La Paz had a population of 16,014 people. The population density was 310 inhabitants per square kilometre (800/sq mi).

== Economy ==
Poverty incidence of La Paz (%)

Source: Philippine Statistics Authority

Bamboo and rattan handicrafts from La Paz

The municipality is known as one of the largest rice producers in Abra. The traditional panagabel weaving serves as a cultural heritage and source of economy in La Paz.

== Government ==
=== Local government ===
La Paz, belonging to the lone congressional district of the province of Abra, is governed by a mayor designated as its local chief executive and by a municipal council as its legislative body in accordance with the Local Government Code. The mayor, vice mayor, and the councilors are elected directly by the people through an election which is being held every three years.

=== Elected officials ===
Members of the Municipal Council (2025–2028)
Position	Name
Congressman	Joseph Sto. Niño B. Bernos
Mayor	Danielle Belynne B. Bernos
Vice-Mayor	Julbert B. Timbreza
Councilors	Benito E. Nono
Councilors	Up-Jhon C. Palos
Councilors	Arnulfo B. Biscarra Jr.
Councilors	Ronnel R. Balaoro
Councilors	Lino A. Bernos II
Councilors	Moises Angelo Q. Galinato
Councilors	Ronald P. Ola
Councilors	Nicasio P. Turqueza

== Education ==
The La Paz Schools District Office governs all educational institutions within the municipality. It oversees the management and operations of all private and public, from primary to secondary schools.

=== Primary and elementary schools ===
- Benben Elementary School
- Bulbulala Elementary School
- Canan Elementary School
- Gongonot Elementary School
- Isit Elementary School
- Liguis Elementary School
- Malabbaga Elementary School
- Mudeng Elementary School
- Pidipid Elementary School
- San Gregorio Elementary School
- Sidongan Primary School
- Toon Elementary School
- Udangan Primary School

=== Secondary schools ===
- La Paz Integrated School
- Marc Ysrael B. Bernos Memorial National High School
- Queen of Peace High School - Canan
- Queen of Peace High School - La Paz
