= List of longest-serving senators of the Philippines =

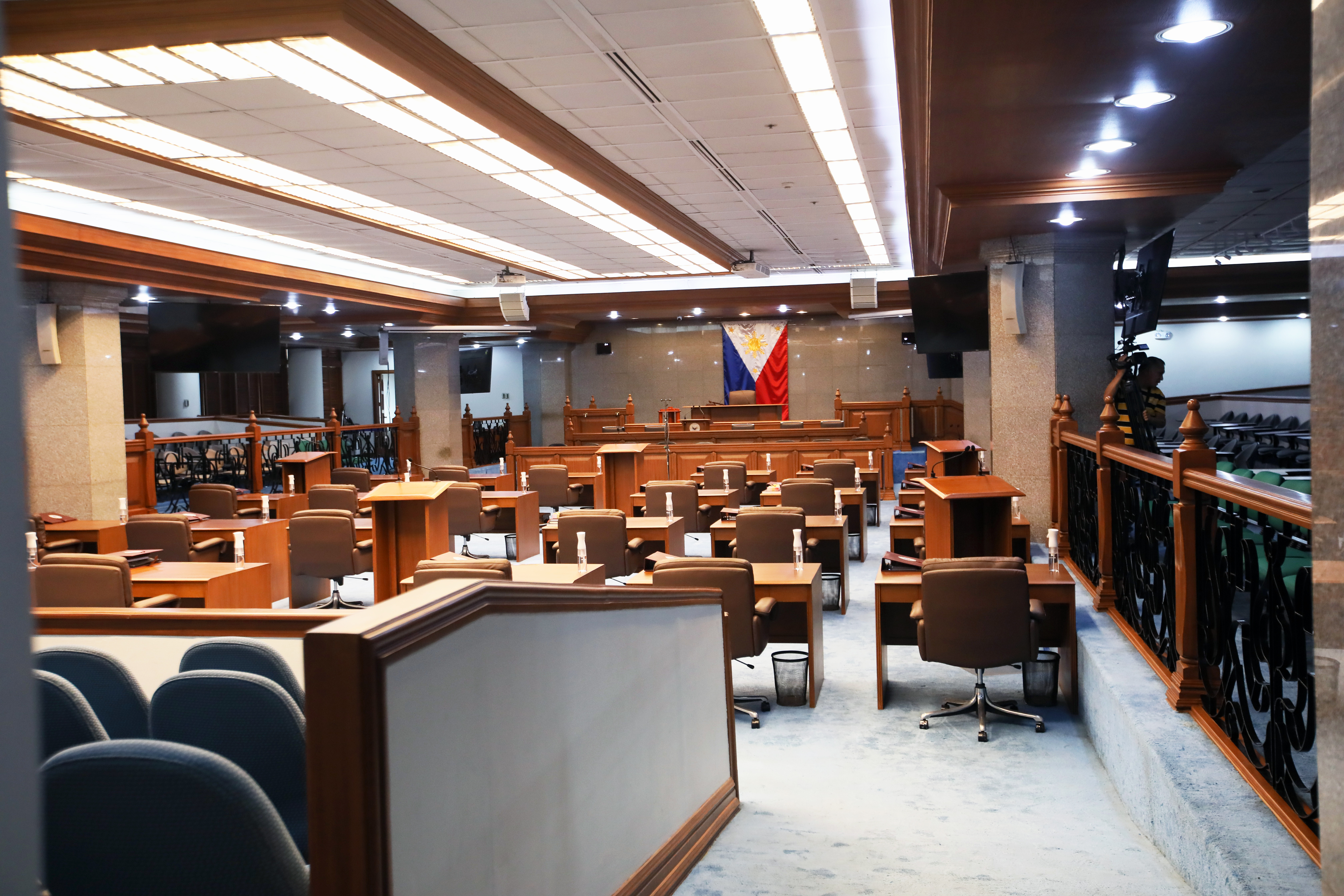
The session hall within the GSIS Building, the current seat of the Philippine Senate.

This list of longest-serving senators of the Philippines includes senators who have served for at least 12 years (a total period exceeding the usual limit of two six-year terms) in the Senate of the Philippines.

For senators elected in 1941, only the days from June 9, 1945, after the First Commonwealth Congress first convened, are counted, excluding the days they were unable to serve due to the Japanese occupation of the Philippines and the outbreak of World War II.

== Time in the Philippine Senate ==
Lorenzo Tañada currently holds the record for the longest uninterrupted term in the Philippine Senate, serving from 30 December 1947 to 30 December 1971—a total of 8,766 days (24 years) of continuous service. Franklin Drilon is tied with Tañada in terms of total length of service, but he served four non-consecutive terms. Tito Sotto assumed office for his fifth term on 30 June 2025 and became the longest-serving senator, in Philippine history overall, surpassing Tañada.

#	Portrait	Name (lifespan)	Party affiliations (Note: Years listed only cover the period the individual held party membership during their senatorial tenure, not necessarily when the senator joined or left their party.)	Constituency	Tenure	Time in office	Overall tenure
1		Tito Sotto (born 1948)	LDP (1992–1997; 1998–2004)	Nationwide at-large	June 30, 1992 – June 30, 2004	12 years, 0 days	25 years, 121 days
1		Tito Sotto (born 1948)	KAMPI (1997–1998)	Nationwide at-large	June 30, 1992 – June 30, 2004	12 years, 0 days	25 years, 121 days
1		Tito Sotto (born 1948)	NPC (2010–2022; 2025–present)	Nationwide at-large	June 30, 2010 – June 30, 2022	12 years, 0 days	25 years, 121 days
1		Tito Sotto (born 1948)	NPC (2010–2022; 2025–present)	Nationwide at-large	June 30, 2025 – present	1 year, 121 days	25 years, 121 days
2 (tie)		Lorenzo Tañada (1898–1992)	Liberal (1947–1953)	Nationwide at-large	December 30, 1947 – December 30, 1971	24 years, 0 days	
2 (tie)		Lorenzo Tañada (1898–1992)	Citizens' (1953–1957)	Nationwide at-large	December 30, 1947 – December 30, 1971	24 years, 0 days	
2 (tie)		Lorenzo Tañada (1898–1992)	NCP (1957–1971)	Nationwide at-large	December 30, 1947 – December 30, 1971	24 years, 0 days	
2 (tie)		Franklin Drilon (born 1945)	Lakas (1995–1998)	Nationwide at-large	June 30, 1995 – June 30, 2007	12 years, 0 days	24 years, 0 days
2 (tie)		Franklin Drilon (born 1945)	LAMMP (1998–2000)	Nationwide at-large	June 30, 1995 – June 30, 2007	12 years, 0 days	24 years, 0 days
2 (tie)		Franklin Drilon (born 1945)	Independent (2000–2003)	Nationwide at-large	June 30, 1995 – June 30, 2007	12 years, 0 days	24 years, 0 days
2 (tie)		Franklin Drilon (born 1945)	Liberal (2003–2007; 2010–2022)	Nationwide at-large	June 30, 1995 – June 30, 2007	12 years, 0 days	24 years, 0 days
2 (tie)		Franklin Drilon (born 1945)	Liberal (2003–2007; 2010–2022)	Nationwide at-large	June 30, 2010 – June 30, 2022	12 years, 0 days	24 years, 0 days
4		Edgardo Angara (1934–2018)	Independent (1987–1992)	Nationwide at-large	June 30, 1987 – June 30, 1998	11 years, 0 days	23 years, 0 days
4		Edgardo Angara (1934–2018)	LDP (1992–1998; 2001–2013)	Nationwide at-large	June 30, 1987 – June 30, 1998	11 years, 0 days	23 years, 0 days
4		Edgardo Angara (1934–2018)	LDP (1992–1998; 2001–2013)	Nationwide at-large	June 30, 2001 – June 30, 2013	12 years, 0 days	23 years, 0 days
5		Juan Ponce Enrile (1924–2025)	Nacionalista (1987–1992)	Nationwide at-large	August 15, 1987 – June 30, 1992	4 years, 320 days	22 years, 320 days
5		Juan Ponce Enrile (1924–2025)	Independent (1995–2001)	Nationwide at-large	June 30, 1995 – June 30, 2001	6 years, 0 days	22 years, 320 days
5		Juan Ponce Enrile (1924–2025)	PMP (2004–2016)	Nationwide at-large	June 30, 2004 – June 30, 2016	12 years, 0 days	22 years, 320 days
6		Loren Legarda (born 1960)	Lakas (1998–2003)	Nationwide at-large	June 30, 1998 – June 30, 2004	6 years, 0 days	22 years, 121 days
6		Loren Legarda (born 1960)	Independent (2003–2004)	Nationwide at-large	June 30, 1998 – June 30, 2004	6 years, 0 days	22 years, 121 days
6		Loren Legarda (born 1960)	NPC (2007–2019; 2022–present)	Nationwide at-large	June 30, 2007 – June 30, 2019	12 years, 0 days	22 years, 121 days
6		Loren Legarda (born 1960)	NPC (2007–2019; 2022–present)	Nationwide at-large	June 30, 2022 – present	4 years, 121 days	22 years, 121 days
7		Gregorio Honasan (born 1948)	Independent (1995–2004; 2007–2012)	Nationwide at-large	June 30, 1995 – June 30, 2004	9 years, 0 days	21 years, 0 days
7		Gregorio Honasan (born 1948)	Independent (1995–2004; 2007–2012)	Nationwide at-large	June 30, 2007 – June 30, 2019	12 years, 0 days	21 years, 0 days
7		Gregorio Honasan (born 1948)	UNA (2012–2019)	Nationwide at-large	June 30, 2007 – June 30, 2019	12 years, 0 days	21 years, 0 days
8 (tie)		Gil Puyat (1907–1981)	Nacionalista (1951–1972)	Nationwide at-large	December 30, 1951 – September 23, 1972	20 years, 268 days	
8 (tie)		Lorenzo Sumulong (1905–1997)	Liberal (1949–1955)	Nationwide at-large	December 30, 1949 – December 30, 1967	18 years, 0 days	20 years, 268 days
8 (tie)		Lorenzo Sumulong (1905–1997)	Nacionalista (1955–1967; 1969–1972)	Nationwide at-large	December 30, 1949 – December 30, 1967	18 years, 0 days	20 years, 268 days
8 (tie)		Lorenzo Sumulong (1905–1997)	Nacionalista (1955–1967; 1969–1972)	Nationwide at-large	December 30, 1969 – September 23, 1972	2 years, 268 days	20 years, 268 days
10		Alejo Mabanag (1886–1979)	Nacionalista; Unipersonalista (1922–1925)	2nd district	June 6, 1922 – June 5, 1928	5 years, 365 days	19 years, 216 days
10		Alejo Mabanag (1886–1979)	Democrata (1925–1928; 1931–1934)	2nd district	June 6, 1922 – June 5, 1928	5 years, 365 days	19 years, 216 days
10		Alejo Mabanag (1886–1979)	Democrata (1925–1928; 1931–1934)	2nd district	June 2, 1931 – November 15, 1935	4 years, 166 days	19 years, 216 days
10		Alejo Mabanag (1886–1979)	Nacionalista; Democrata; Pro-Independencia (1934–1935)	2nd district	June 2, 1931 – November 15, 1935	4 years, 166 days	19 years, 216 days
10		Alejo Mabanag (1886–1979)	Nacionalista (1946–1949; 1953–1959)	Nationwide at-large	May 25, 1946 – December 30, 1949	3 years, 219 days	19 years, 216 days
10		Alejo Mabanag (1886–1979)	Nacionalista (1946–1949; 1953–1959)	Nationwide at-large	December 30, 1953 – July 14, 1959	5 years, 196 days	19 years, 216 days
11 (tie)		Panfilo Lacson (born 1948)	LDP (2001–2004)	Nationwide at-large	June 30, 2001 – June 30, 2013	12 years, 0 days	19 years, 121 days
11 (tie)		Panfilo Lacson (born 1948)	Independent (2004–2013; 2016–2021)	Nationwide at-large	June 30, 2001 – June 30, 2013	12 years, 0 days	19 years, 121 days
11 (tie)		Panfilo Lacson (born 1948)	Independent (2004–2013; 2016–2021)	Nationwide at-large	June 30, 2016 – June 30, 2022	6 years, 0 days	19 years, 121 days
11 (tie)		Panfilo Lacson (born 1948)	Reporma (2021–2022)	Nationwide at-large	June 30, 2016 – June 30, 2022	6 years, 0 days	19 years, 121 days
11 (tie)		Panfilo Lacson (born 1948)	Independent (2025–present)	Nationwide at-large	June 30, 2025 – present	1 year, 121 days	19 years, 121 days
11 (tie)		Kiko Pangilinan (born 1963)	Liberal (2001–2013; 2016–2022; 2025–present)	Nationwide at-large	June 30, 2001 – June 30, 2013	12 years, 0 days	19 years, 121 days
11 (tie)		Kiko Pangilinan (born 1963)	Liberal (2001–2013; 2016–2022; 2025–present)	Nationwide at-large	June 30, 2016 – June 30, 2022	6 years, 0 days	19 years, 121 days
11 (tie)		Kiko Pangilinan (born 1963)	Liberal (2001–2013; 2016–2022; 2025–present)	Nationwide at-large	June 30, 2025 – present	1 year, 121 days	19 years, 121 days
11 (tie)		Pia Cayetano (born 1966)	Lakas (2004–2007)	Nationwide at-large	June 30, 2004 – June 30, 2016	12 years, 0 days	19 years, 121 days
11 (tie)		Pia Cayetano (born 1966)	Nacionalista (2007–2016; 2019–present)	Nationwide at-large	June 30, 2004 – June 30, 2016	12 years, 0 days	19 years, 121 days
11 (tie)		Pia Cayetano (born 1966)	Nacionalista (2007–2016; 2019–present)	Nationwide at-large	June 30, 2019 – present	7 years, 121 days	19 years, 121 days
11 (tie)		Lito Lapid (born 1955)	Lakas (2004–2012)	Nationwide at-large	June 30, 2004 – June 30, 2016	12 years, 0 days	19 years, 121 days
11 (tie)		Lito Lapid (born 1955)	Independent (2012–2016)	Nationwide at-large	June 30, 2004 – June 30, 2016	12 years, 0 days	19 years, 121 days
11 (tie)		Lito Lapid (born 1955)	NPC (2019–present)	Nationwide at-large	June 30, 2019 – present	7 years, 121 days	19 years, 121 days
15		Manuel L. Quezon (1878–1944)	Nacionalista (1916–1922; 1925–1934)	5th district	October 16, 1916 – November 15, 1935	19 years, 30 days	
15		Manuel L. Quezon (1878–1944)	Nacionalista; Colectivista (1922–1925)	5th district	October 16, 1916 – November 15, 1935	19 years, 30 days	
15		Manuel L. Quezon (1878–1944)	Nacionalista; Democratico (1934–1935)	5th district	October 16, 1916 – November 15, 1935	19 years, 30 days	
16		José Clarín (1879–1935)	Nacionalista (1916–1922; 1925–1931)	11th district	October 16, 1916 – June 2, 1935	18 years, 229 days	
16		José Clarín (1879–1935)	Nacionalista; Unipersonalista (1922–1925)	11th district	October 16, 1916 – June 2, 1935	18 years, 229 days	
16		José Clarín (1879–1935)	Democrata (1931–1934)	11th district	October 16, 1916 – June 2, 1935	18 years, 229 days	
16		José Clarín (1879–1935)	Nacionalista; Democratico (1934–1935)	11th district	October 16, 1916 – June 2, 1935	18 years, 229 days	
17 (tie)		Serge Osmeña (born 1943)	Lakas (1995–1997)	Nationwide at-large	June 30, 1995 – June 30, 2007	12 years, 0 days	18 years, 0 days
17 (tie)		Serge Osmeña (born 1943)	Independent (1997–1998)	Nationwide at-large	June 30, 1995 – June 30, 2007	12 years, 0 days	18 years, 0 days
17 (tie)		Serge Osmeña (born 1943)	Liberal (1998–2001)	Nationwide at-large	June 30, 1995 – June 30, 2007	12 years, 0 days	18 years, 0 days
17 (tie)		Serge Osmeña (born 1943)	PDP–Laban (2001–2007)	Nationwide at-large	June 30, 1995 – June 30, 2007	12 years, 0 days	18 years, 0 days
17 (tie)		Serge Osmeña (born 1943)	Independent (2010–2016)	Nationwide at-large	June 30, 2010 – June 30, 2016	6 years, 0 days	18 years, 0 days
17 (tie)		Miriam Defensor Santiago (1945–2016)	PRP (1995–2001; 2004–2016)	Nationwide at-large	June 30, 1995 – June 30, 2001	6 years, 0 days	18 years, 0 days
17 (tie)		Miriam Defensor Santiago (1945–2016)	PRP (1995–2001; 2004–2016)	Nationwide at-large	June 30, 2004 – June 30, 2016	12 years, 0 days	18 years, 0 days
17 (tie)		Ralph Recto (born 1964)	Lakas (2001–2004)	Nationwide at-large	June 30, 2001 – June 30, 2007	6 years, 0 days	18 years, 0 days
17 (tie)		Ralph Recto (born 1964)	Nacionalista (2004–2007)	Nationwide at-large	June 30, 2001 – June 30, 2007	6 years, 0 days	18 years, 0 days
17 (tie)		Ralph Recto (born 1964)	Liberal (2010–2018)	Nationwide at-large	June 30, 2010 – June 30, 2022	12 years, 0 days	18 years, 0 days
17 (tie)		Ralph Recto (born 1964)	Nacionalista (2018–2022)	Nationwide at-large	June 30, 2010 – June 30, 2022	12 years, 0 days	18 years, 0 days
17 (tie)		Bong Revilla (born 1966)	Lakas (2004–2016; 2019–2025)	Nationwide at-large	June 30, 2004 – June 30, 2016	12 years, 0 days	18 years, 0 days
17 (tie)		Bong Revilla (born 1966)	Lakas (2004–2016; 2019–2025)	Nationwide at-large	June 30, 2019 – June 30, 2025	6 years, 0 days	18 years, 0 days
21		Arturo Tolentino (1910–2004)	Nacionalista (1957–1972)	Nationwide at-large	December 30, 1957 – September 23, 1972	14 years, 268 days	17 years, 268 days
21		Arturo Tolentino (1910–2004)	NPC (1992–1995)	Nationwide at-large	June 30, 1992 – June 30, 1995	3 years, 0 days	17 years, 268 days
22		Eulogio Rodriguez (1883–1964)	Nacionalista (1945–1947; 1949–1964)	Nationwide at-large	June 9, 1945 – December 30, 1947	2 years, 204 days	17 years, 184 days
22		Eulogio Rodriguez (1883–1964)	Nacionalista (1945–1947; 1949–1964)	Nationwide at-large	December 30, 1949 – December 9, 1964	14 years, 345 days	17 years, 184 days
23		Aquilino Pimentel Jr. (1933–2019)	PDP–Laban (1987–1992; 1998–2010)	Nationwide at-large	June 30, 1987 – June 30, 1992	5 years, 0 days	17 years, 0 days
23		Aquilino Pimentel Jr. (1933–2019)	PDP–Laban (1987–1992; 1998–2010)	Nationwide at-large	June 30, 1998 – June 30, 2010	12 years, 0 days	17 years, 0 days
24		Mariano Cuenco (1888–1964)	Nacionalista (1945–1946)	Nationwide at-large	June 9, 1945 – December 30, 1951	6 years, 204 days	16 years, 261 days
24		Mariano Cuenco (1888–1964)	Liberal (1946–1951)	Nationwide at-large	June 9, 1945 – December 30, 1951	6 years, 204 days	16 years, 261 days
24		Mariano Cuenco (1888–1964)	Nacionalista (1953–1964)	Nationwide at-large	December 30, 1953 – February 25, 1964	10 years, 57 days	16 years, 261 days
25 (tie)		Jinggoy Estrada (born 1963)	PMP (2004–2016; 2022–present)	Nationwide at-large	June 30, 2004 – June 30, 2016	12 years, 0 days	16 years, 121 days
25 (tie)		Jinggoy Estrada (born 1963)	PMP (2004–2016; 2022–present)	Nationwide at-large	June 30, 2022 – present	4 years, 121 days	16 years, 121 days
25 (tie)		Francis Escudero (born 1969)	NPC (2007–2009)	Nationwide at-large	June 30, 2007 – June 30, 2019	12 years, 0 days	16 years, 121 days
25 (tie)		Francis Escudero (born 1969)	Independent (2009–2018)	Nationwide at-large	June 30, 2007 – June 30, 2019	12 years, 0 days	16 years, 121 days
25 (tie)		Francis Escudero (born 1969)	NPC (2018–2019; 2022–present)	Nationwide at-large	June 30, 2007 – June 30, 2019	12 years, 0 days	16 years, 121 days
25 (tie)		Francis Escudero (born 1969)	NPC (2018–2019; 2022–present)	Nationwide at-large	June 30, 2022 – present	4 years, 121 days	16 years, 121 days
27		Camilo Osías (1889–1976)	Nacionalista (1925–1929; 1947–1953)	2nd district	June 2, 1925 – March 4, 1929	3 years, 275 days	15 years, 275 days
27		Camilo Osías (1889–1976)	Nacionalista (1925–1929; 1947–1953)	Nationwide at-large	December 30, 1947 – December 30, 1953	6 years, 0 days	15 years, 275 days
27		Camilo Osías (1889–1976)	Liberal (1961–1967)	Nationwide at-large	December 30, 1961 – December 30, 1967	6 years, 0 days	15 years, 275 days
28		Rodolfo Biazon (1935–2023)	LDP (1992–1995; 1998–2004)	Nationwide at-large	June 30, 1992 – June 30, 1995	3 years, 0 days	15 years, 0 days
28		Rodolfo Biazon (1935–2023)	LDP (1992–1995; 1998–2004)	Nationwide at-large	June 30, 1998 – June 30, 2010	12 years, 0 days	15 years, 0 days
28		Rodolfo Biazon (1935–2023)	Aksyon (2004)	Nationwide at-large	June 30, 1998 – June 30, 2010	12 years, 0 days	15 years, 0 days
28		Rodolfo Biazon (1935–2023)	Liberal (2004–2010)	Nationwide at-large	June 30, 1998 – June 30, 2010	12 years, 0 days	15 years, 0 days
29 (tie)		Ambrosio Padilla (1910–1996)	Liberal (1957–1972)	Nationwide at-large	December 30, 1957 – September 23, 1972	14 years, 268 days	
29 (tie)		John Henry Osmeña (1935–2021)	Liberal (1971–1972; 1987–1992)	Nationwide at-large	December 30, 1971 – September 23, 1972	268 days	14 years, 268 days
29 (tie)		John Henry Osmeña (1935–2021)	Liberal (1971–1972; 1987–1992)	Nationwide at-large	June 30, 1987 – June 30, 1995	8 years, 0 days	14 years, 268 days
29 (tie)		John Henry Osmeña (1935–2021)	NPC (1992–1995; 2001–2004)	Nationwide at-large	June 30, 1987 – June 30, 1995	8 years, 0 days	14 years, 268 days
29 (tie)		John Henry Osmeña (1935–2021)	NPC (1992–1995; 2001–2004)	Nationwide at-large	June 30, 1998 – June 30, 2004	6 years, 0 days	14 years, 268 days
29 (tie)		John Henry Osmeña (1935–2021)	LDP (1998–2001)	Nationwide at-large	June 30, 1998 – June 30, 2004	6 years, 0 days	14 years, 268 days
31		Juan Miguel Zubiri (born 1969)	Lakas (2007–2011)	Nationwide at-large	June 30, 2007 – August 3, 2011	4 years, 34 days	14 years, 155 days
31		Juan Miguel Zubiri (born 1969)	Independent (2016–present)	Nationwide at-large	June 30, 2016 – present	10 years, 121 days	14 years, 155 days
32		Alan Peter Cayetano (born 1970)	Nacionalista (2007–2017)	Nationwide at-large	June 30, 2007 – May 17, 2017	9 years, 321 days	14 years, 77 days
32		Alan Peter Cayetano (born 1970)	Independent (2022–present)	Nationwide at-large	June 30, 2022 – present	4 years, 121 days	14 years, 77 days
33		Fernando Lopez (1904–1993)	Liberal (1947–1949)	Nationwide at-large	December 30, 1947 – December 30, 1949	2 years, 0 days	14 years, 0 days
33		Fernando Lopez (1904–1993)	Democratic (1953–1957)	Nationwide at-large	December 30, 1953 – December 30, 1965	12 years, 0 days	14 years, 0 days
33		Fernando Lopez (1904–1993)	Nacionalista (1957–1965)	Nationwide at-large	December 30, 1953 – December 30, 1965	12 years, 0 days	14 years, 0 days
34		Claro M. Recto (1890–1960)	Democrata (1931–1934)	5th district	June 2, 1931 – November 15, 1935	4 years, 166 days	13 years, 333 days
34		Claro M. Recto (1890–1960)	Nacionalista; Democratico (1934–1935)	5th district	June 2, 1931 – November 15, 1935	4 years, 166 days	13 years, 333 days
34		Claro M. Recto (1890–1960)	Nacionalista (1945–1946; 1952–1958)	Nationwide at-large	June 9, 1945 – May 25, 1946	350 days	13 years, 333 days
34		Claro M. Recto (1890–1960)	Nacionalista (1945–1946; 1952–1958)	Nationwide at-large	April 3, 1952 – October 2, 1960	8 years, 182 days	13 years, 333 days
34		Claro M. Recto (1890–1960)	Citizens' (1958–1960)	Nationwide at-large	April 3, 1952 – October 2, 1960	8 years, 182 days	13 years, 333 days
35		Koko Pimentel (born 1964)	PDP–Laban (2011–2021)	Nationwide at-large	August 11, 2011 – June 30, 2025	13 years, 323 days	
35		Koko Pimentel (born 1964)	Nacionalista (2024–2025)	Nationwide at-large	August 11, 2011 – June 30, 2025	13 years, 323 days	
36		José O. Vera (1888–1956)	Nacionalista (1925–1931; 1931–1934)	6th district	June 2, 1925 – June 2, 1931	6 years, 0 days	13 years, 308 days
36		José O. Vera (1888–1956)	Nacionalista (1925–1931; 1931–1934)	6th district	August 18, 1931 – November 15, 1935	4 years, 89 days	13 years, 308 days
36		José O. Vera (1888–1956)	Nacionalista; Democrata; Pro-Independencia (1934–1935)	6th district	August 18, 1931 – November 15, 1935	4 years, 89 days	13 years, 308 days
36		José O. Vera (1888–1956)	Nacionalista (1946–1949)	Nationwide at-large	May 25, 1946 – December 30, 1949	3 years, 219 days	13 years, 308 days
37		Sergio Osmeña (1878–1961)	Nacionalista; Unipersonalista (1922–1925)	10th district	June 6, 1922 – November 15, 1935	13 years, 162 days	
37		Sergio Osmeña (1878–1961)	Nacionalista (1925–1934)	10th district	June 6, 1922 – November 15, 1935	13 years, 162 days	
37		Sergio Osmeña (1878–1961)	Nacionalista; Democrata; Pro-Independencia (1934–1935)	10th district	June 6, 1922 – November 15, 1935	13 years, 162 days	
38		Jose Maria Veloso (1886–1969)	Nacionalista (1916–1919)	9th district	October 16, 1916 – June 3, 1919	2 years, 230 days	13 years, 31 days
38		Jose Maria Veloso (1886–1969)	Democrata (1925–1931)	9th district	June 2, 1925 – November 15, 1935	10 years, 166 days	13 years, 31 days
38		Jose Maria Veloso (1886–1969)	Nacionalista (1931–1934)	9th district	June 2, 1925 – November 15, 1935	10 years, 166 days	13 years, 31 days
38		Jose Maria Veloso (1886–1969)	Nacionalista; Democratico (1934–1935)	9th district	June 2, 1925 – November 15, 1935	10 years, 166 days	13 years, 31 days
39		Hadji Butu (1865–1937)	Nacionalista (1916–1920)	12th district	October 16, 1916 – November 15, 1920	4 years, 30 days	13 years, 26 days
39		Hadji Butu (1865–1937)	Democrata (1922–1931)	12th district	June 6, 1922 – June 2, 1931	8 years, 361 days	13 years, 26 days
40		José Avelino (1890–1986)	Nacionalista (1928–1935)	9th district	June 5, 1928 – November 15, 1935	7 years, 163 days	13 years, 17 days
40		José Avelino (1890–1986)	Liberal (1946–1951)	Nationwide at-large	May 25, 1946 – December 30, 1951	5 years, 219 days	13 years, 17 days
41		Quintín Paredes (1884–1973)	Nacionalista (1945–1946)	Nationwide at-large	June 9, 1945 – May 25, 1946	350 days	12 years, 350 days
41		Quintín Paredes (1884–1973)	Liberal (1949–1961)	Nationwide at-large	December 30, 1949 – December 30, 1961	12 years, 0 days	12 years, 350 days
42		Emiliano Tría Tirona (1883–1952)	Democrata (1922–1928)	4th district	June 6, 1922 – June 5, 1928	5 years, 365 days	12 years, 304 days
42		Emiliano Tría Tirona (1883–1952)	Nacionalista (1945–1947)	Nationwide at-large	June 9, 1945 – April 8, 1952	6 years, 304 days	12 years, 304 days
42		Emiliano Tría Tirona (1883–1952)	Liberal (1947–1952)	Nationwide at-large	June 9, 1945 – April 8, 1952	6 years, 304 days	12 years, 304 days
43 (tie)		Alejandro Almendras (1919–1995)	Nacionalista (1959–1972)	Nationwide at-large	December 30, 1959 – September 23, 1972	12 years, 268 days	
43 (tie)		Genaro Magsaysay (1924–1978)	Nacionalista (1959–1969)	Nationwide at-large	December 30, 1959 – September 23, 1972	12 years, 268 days	
43 (tie)		Genaro Magsaysay (1924–1978)	Liberal (1969–1972)	Nationwide at-large	December 30, 1959 – September 23, 1972	12 years, 268 days	

== Seniority in the Philippine Senate ==
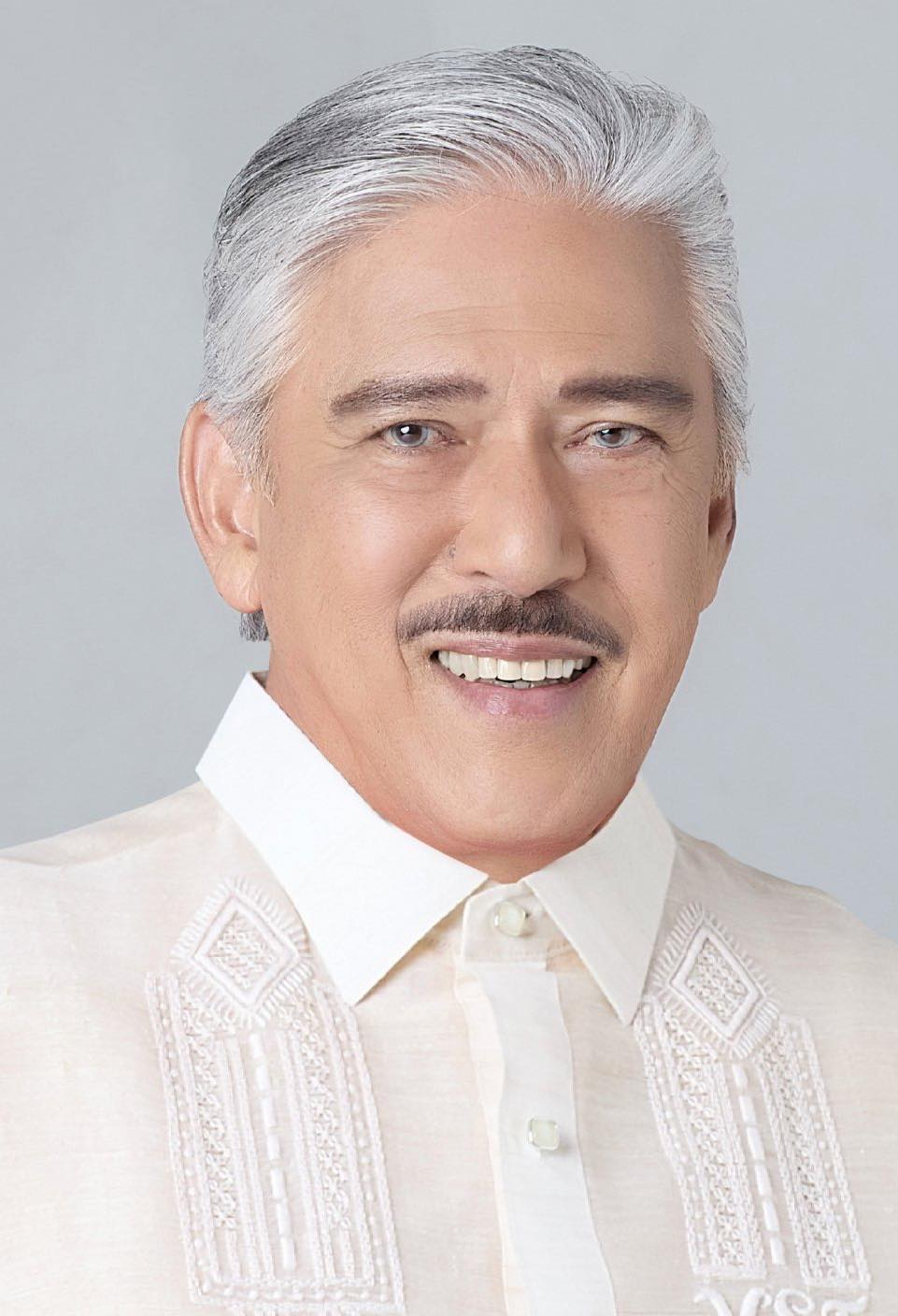
Tito Sotto is currently the most senior senator as of 2025.

Seniority in the Philippine Senate is customarily determined by the cumulative length of prior service in the Senate before the current Congress. When two or more senators have served for the same cumulative length of time, seniority is determined first by the longest uninterrupted period of prior service and, if still tied, by the earlier date on which the cumulative length of service was achieved. The most senior senator, similar to the Dean of the United States Senate, has traditionally been elected president of the Senate or president pro tempore, although this practice has become less common in the modern Senate.

As of the 20th Congress, the most senior member of the Senate is Tito Sotto, who had served 24 years before his re-election in 2025. He succeeded Loren Legarda, who was the most senior senator during the 19th Congress.

Legislature	Senator	Party	Length of previous tenures
8th Congress	Jovito Salonga	Liberal	6 years, 268 days
9th Congress	Arturo Tolentino	NPC	14 years, 268 days
10th Congress	Ernesto Maceda	NPC	8 years, 268 days
11th Congress	John Henry Osmeña	LDP	8 years, 268 days
12th Congress	John Henry Osmeña	NPC	11 years, 268 days
13th Congress	Edgardo Angara	LDP	14 years, 0 days
14th Congress	Edgardo Angara	LDP	17 years, 0 days
15th Congress	Edgardo Angara	LDP	20 years, 0 days
16th Congress	Juan Ponce Enrile	PMP	19 years, 320 days
17th Congress	Tito Sotto	NPC	18 years, 0 days
18th Congress	Tito Sotto	NPC	21 years, 0 days
19th Congress	Loren Legarda	NPC	18 years, 0 days
20th Congress	Tito Sotto	NPC	24 years, 0 days

== See also ==
- List of senators of the Philippines
