= Pantukan =

Municipality in Davao de Oro, Philippines

- Municipality
- Municipality of Pantukan
- Nickname: The Gold Coast
- Map of Davao de Oro with Pantukan highlighted
- Interactive map of Pantukan
- Location within the Philippines
- Coordinates: 7°07′37″N 125°53′51″E
- Country: Philippines
- Region: Davao Region
- Province: Davao de Oro
- District: 2nd district
- Founded: November 13, 1936
- Barangays: 13 (see Barangays)

Government
  - Type: Sangguniang Bayan
  - Mayor: Oliver Ceniza (Lakas)
  - Vice Mayor: Cirila Arancon-Engbino (Independent)
  - Representative: Leonel Ceniza
  - Electorate: 66,946 voters (2025)

Area
  - Total: 533.11 km^{2} (205.83 sq mi)
- Elevation: 22 m (72 ft)
- Highest elevation: 302 m (991 ft)
- Lowest elevation: 0 m (0 ft)

Population (2024 census)
  - Total: 91,312
  - Density: 171.28/km^{2} (443.62/sq mi)
  - Households: 21,663

Economy
  - Income class: 1st municipal income class
  - Poverty incidence: 17.58% (2023)
  - Revenue: ₱ 528.1 million (2024)
  - Assets: ₱ 1,366 million (2024)
  - Expenditure: ₱ 522.4 million (2024)
  - Liabilities: ₱ 380.8 million (2024)

Service provider
  - Electricity: Northern Davao Electric Cooperative (NORDECO)
  - Water: Pantukan Waterworks
  - Telecommunications: Dito Telecommunity; Globe Telecom; PLDT
  - Cable TV: Trinity Cable TV Network, Inc. (Mati-based, Pantukan branch)
- Time zone: UTC+8 (PST)
- ZIP code: 8809
- PSGC: 1108211000
- IDD : area code: +63 (0)87
- Native languages: Davawenyo; Cebuano; Kalagan; Mansaka; Tagalog; Ata Manobo
- Website: pantukan.gov.ph

Pantukan, officially the Municipality of Pantukan (Cebuano: Lungsod sa Pantukan; Tagalog: Bayan ng Pantukan), is a municipality in the province of Davao de Oro, Philippines. According to the 2024 census, it has a population of 91,312 people.

== History ==
In 1914, Governor General Charles Yeater declared Pantukan as a municipal district. Sangui, a Mansaka, was appointed president. A year after, he was replaced by Bancas Mansaka. On November 13, 1936, President Manuel L. Quezon declared it a regular municipality of the then-undivided province of Davao, therefore becoming the oldest town in Davao de Oro. Teodoro Fuentes was appointed its first Alkalde. Juan Caballero Sr. was its first elected Mayor.

It later became part of Davao del Norte upon the division of Davao on May 8, 1967, and Compostela Valley (now Davao de Oro) beginning in 1998.

== Geography ==
=== Barangays ===
Pantukan is politically subdivided into 13 barangays. Each barangay consists of puroks while some have sitios.

- Bongabong
- Bongbong
- P. Fuentes
- Kingking (Poblacion)
- Magnaga
- Matiao
- Napnapan
- Tagdangua
- Tambongon
- Tibagon
- Las Arenas
- Araibo
- Tagugpo

=== Climate ===
Climate data for Pantukan
Month	Jan	Feb	Mar	Apr	May	Jun	Jul	Aug	Sep	Oct	Nov	Dec	Year
Mean daily maximum °C (°F)	29 (84)	30 (86)	30 (86)	31 (88)	30 (86)	29 (84)	29 (84)	29 (84)	30 (86)	30 (86)	29 (84)	30 (86)	30 (85)
Mean daily minimum °C (°F)	22 (72)	22 (72)	22 (72)	23 (73)	25 (77)	25 (77)	24 (75)	24 (75)	24 (75)	24 (75)	24 (75)	23 (73)	24 (74)
Average precipitation mm (inches)	168 (6.6)	141 (5.6)	143 (5.6)	141 (5.6)	216 (8.5)	235 (9.3)	183 (7.2)	169 (6.7)	143 (5.6)	176 (6.9)	226 (8.9)	168 (6.6)	2,109 (83.1)
Average rainy days	22.1	18.5	21.7	22.5	27.8	28.1	27.4	26.6	24.7	26.3	26.5	24.9	297.1
Source: Meteoblue

== Demographics ==
Population census of Pantukan
Year	Pop.	±% p.a.
1918	8,162	—
1939	15,591	+3.13%
1948	17,234	+1.12%
1960	16,493	−0.37%
1970	21,890	+2.87%
1975	25,291	+2.94%
1980	30,281	+3.67%
1990	46,300	+4.34%
1995	56,780	+3.90%
2000	61,801	+1.83%
2007	69,656	+1.66%
2010	79,067	+4.72%
2015	85,899	+1.59%
2020	90,786	+1.17%
2024	91,312	+0.14%
Source: Philippine Statistics Authority

In the 2020 census, the population of Pantukan was 91,312 people, with a density of 170 inhabitants per square kilometre or 440 inhabitants per square mile.

== Economy ==
Poverty incidence of Pantukan (%)

Source: Philippine Statistics Authority

The municipality is primarily dependent on mining but agriculture thrives in communities within its boundary. While small scale mining operates in the town, a large mining operator has been granted permit to explore gold in the area. Gold deposits in Barangay Kingking alone is estimated to be at 10.3 million ounces (290,000 kg) with copper deposits of 5.4 billion pounds (2.4 Mt). Nationwide Development Corporation (Nadecor) holds the Mineral Production Sharing Agreement (MPSA) for the Kingking mine site.
