= Bonifacio Bosita =

Filipino activist and politician

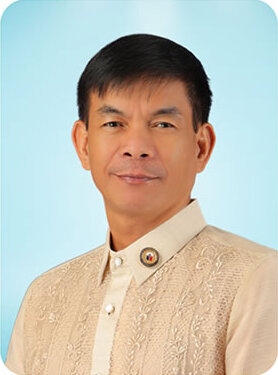
- Official portrait, 2022

Member of the Philippine House of Representatives for 1-Rider Partylist
- In office June 30, 2022 – June 30, 2025 Serving with Rodge Gutierrez

Personal details
- Born: Bonifacio Laqui Bosita; November 30, 1966 (age 59) Lucena, Quezon, Philippines
- Party: Ang Buklod ng mga Motorista ng Pilipinas (1-Rider)
- Spouse: Aida Mauzar
- Education: Enverga University (BS); Development Academy of the Philippines (MM)
- Occupation: Police officer (former), motorcycle rights activist, politician, YouTuber
- Police career
- Service: Philippine National Police
- Allegiance: Philippines
- Divisions: Highway Patrol Group
- Rank: Police Lieutenant Colonel

YouTube information
- Channel: Colonel Bosita, RSAP
- Years active: 2019–present
- Genre: Vlog
- Subscribers: 1.17 million
- Views: 112.6 million
- Last updated: March 28, 2026

Bonifacio "Colonel" Laqui Bosita (born November 30, 1966) is a Filipino politician, motorcycle rights activist, and retired police officer. He served as a representative for the 1-Rider Partylist alongside Rodge Gutierrez in the House of Representatives from 2022 to 2025.

In February 2025, Bosita did not sign the impeachment complaint against vice president Sara Duterte, contrasting with Gutierrez who voted in favor of impeachment.

== Education ==
Bosita studied Bachelor of Science in Civil Engineering at Manuel S. Enverga University Foundation in 1988. He also earned a Master's degree in Management, majoring in Development and Security, from the Development Academy of the Philippines.

== Police career ==
Bosita is a former police officer who was part of the Highway Patrol Group of the Philippine National Police (PNP). He also served as the Public Information Office Chief of the Cavite office of the PNP.

== Riders' Safety Advocates of the Philippines ==
Bosita is the founder of the Riders' Safety Advocates of the Philippines (RSAP), a group dedicated to promoting road safety for riders and motorists.

=== 2021 slipper case ===
Bosita gained public attention in March 2021 when he was featured in a viral video disputing a Metropolitan Manila Development Authority (MMDA) traffic enforcer's decision to issue a ticket to a couple riding a motorcycle for violating a shoes-only policy. The driver was wearing shoes, but the backseat passenger, a woman, was penalized for wearing slippers, causing her to miss a day of work. Bosita argued that the policy should only apply to the driver and demanded that the enforcer pay the backseat passenger's salary for the day, which amounted to around ₱500. This led to MMDA traffic czar Edison Bong Nebrija accusing Bosita of exploiting traffic enforcers for political gain.

In February 2022, Bosita was arrested in Surigao del Sur in connection with the March 2021 incident after charges of grave coercion and usurpation of authority were filed against him by Nebrija. He posted bail for both charges.

=== Online presence ===
Bosita runs a YouTube channel under the name "Colonel Bosita, RSAP" as part of his work with RSAP. In April 2021, he received a Silver Play Button after his channel surpassed 348,000 subscribers, well beyond the minimum requirement of 100,000 subscribers. As of May 2022, Bosita has gained a following of 800,000 on Facebook.

== Political career ==
Following the March 2021 incident, Bosita decided to enter politics, initially planning to run for Senator. His group partnered with the Bicol-based motorcycle club 1-Rider, which aimed to gain partylist representation in the House of Representatives. Bosita was named second nominee of the group, although he was actively involved in 1-Rider's campaign, frequently appearing in videos and other election materials. 1-Rider garnered enough votes to secure two seats, which were filled by Rodge Gutierrez and Bosita himself.

In October 2024, Bosita filed his certificate of candidacy for the 2025 Philippine Senate election, running as an independent candidate. His platform focused on road safety and the rights of motorcycle riders. He eventually lost, placing 20th in the official results.

== Electoral history ==
Electoral history of Bonifacio Bosita
Year	Office	Party	Votes received				Result
Year	Office	Party	Total	%	P.	Swing	Result
2022	Representative (Party-list)	1-Rider	1,001,243	2.75%	2nd	—N/a	Won
2025	Senator of the Philippines	IND	9,805,903	17.10%	20th	—N/a	Lost
