= Lucena =

Highly-urbanized city in Calabarzon, Philippines

- Highly urbanized city
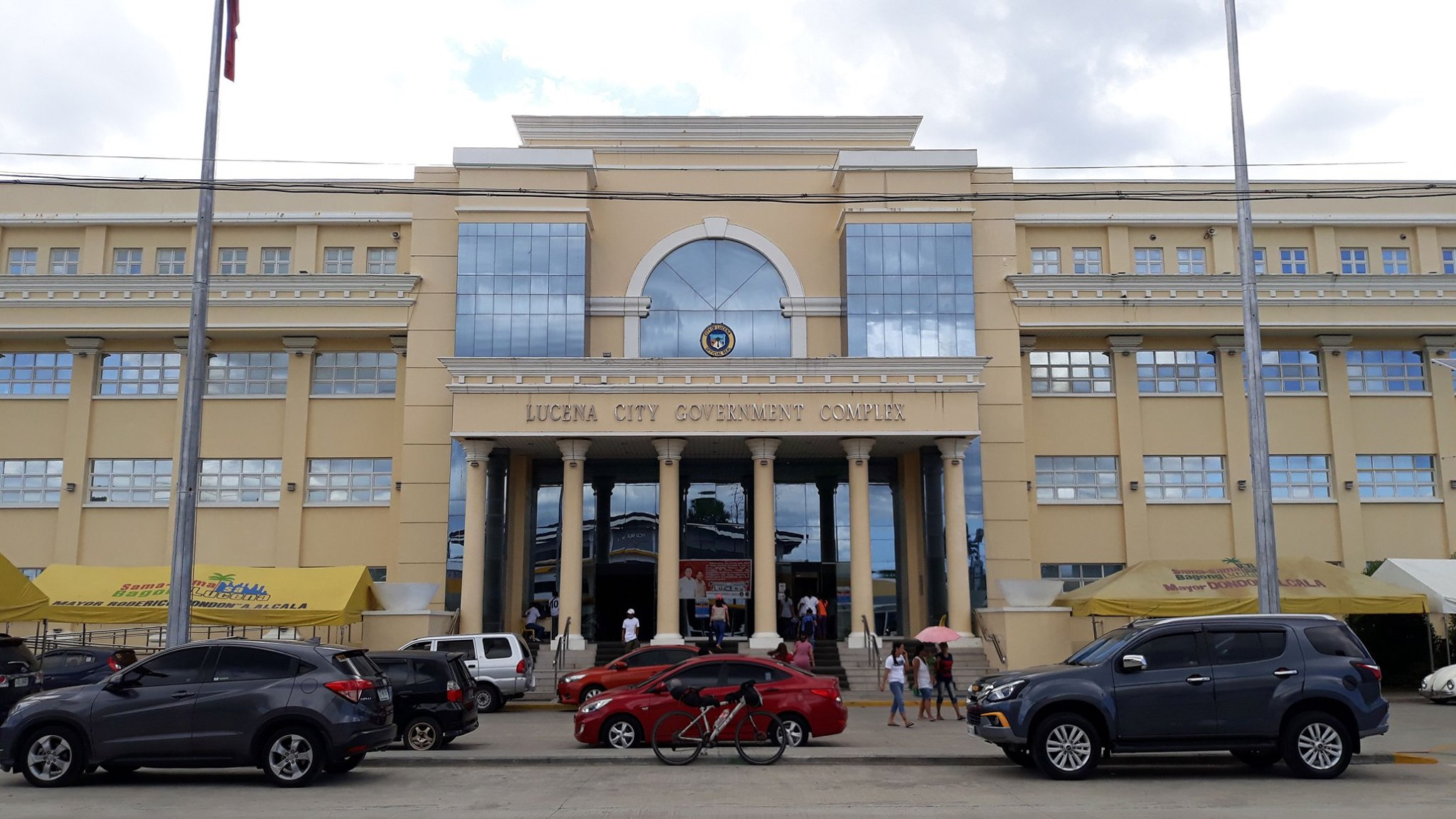
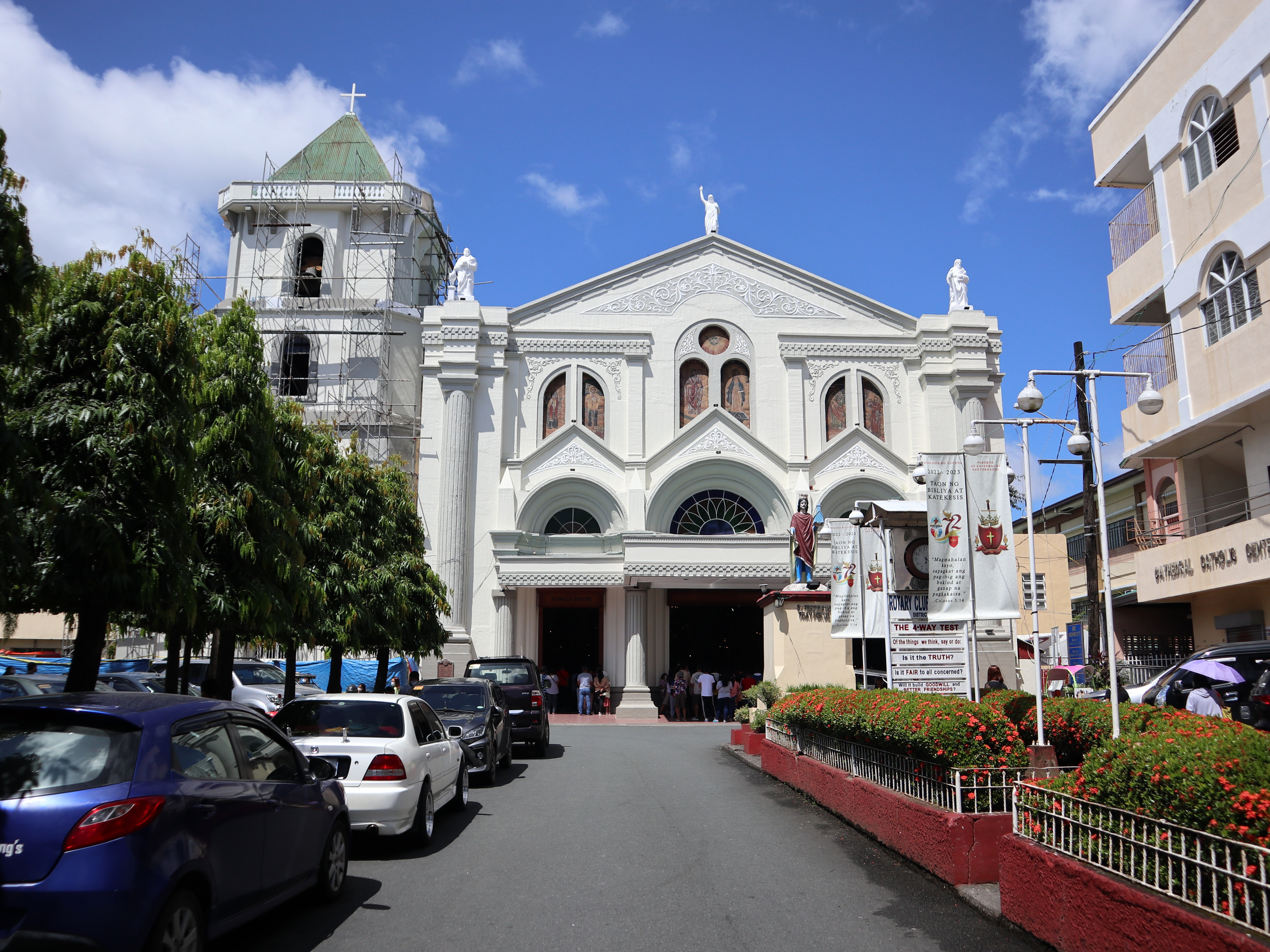
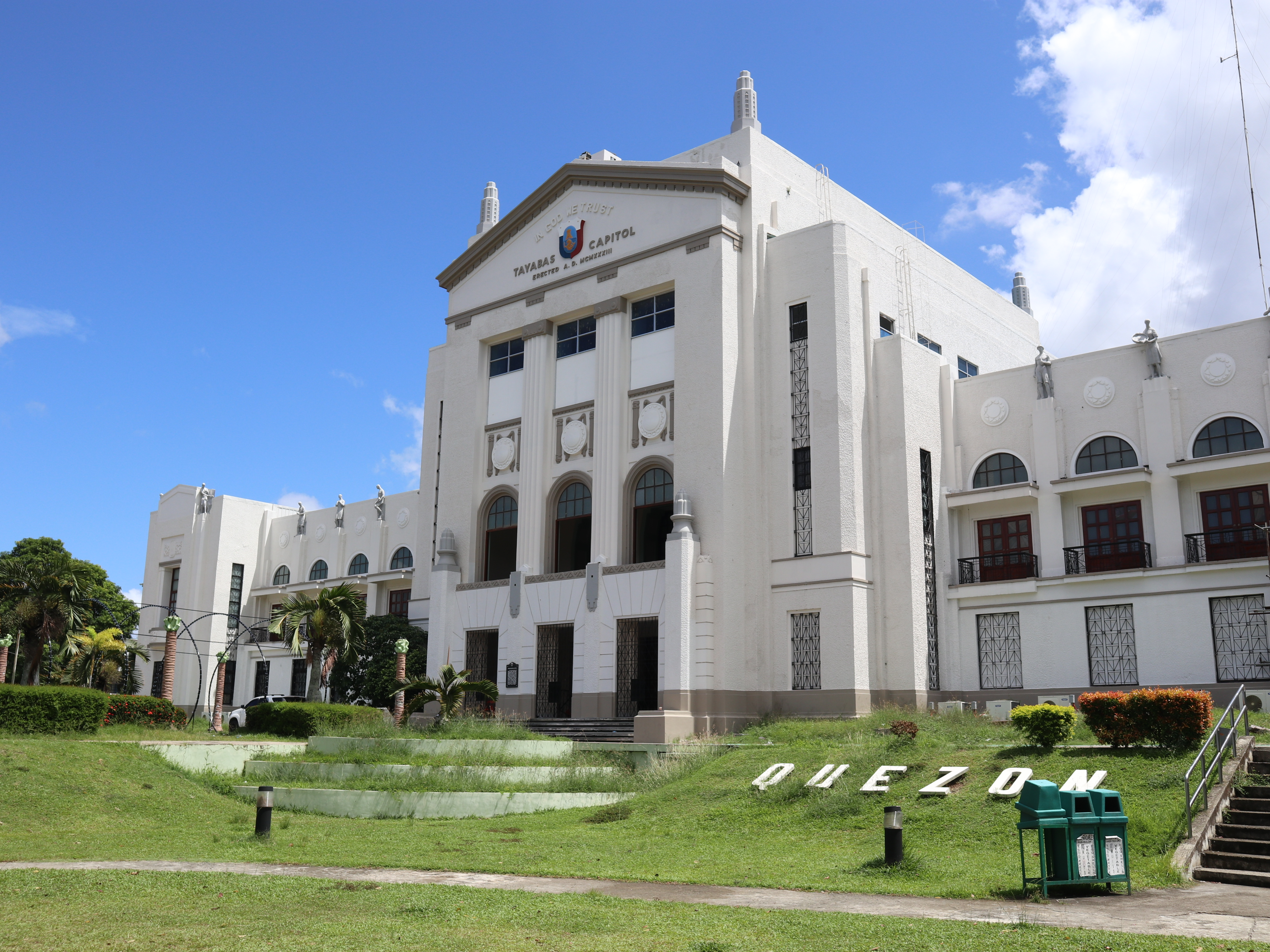
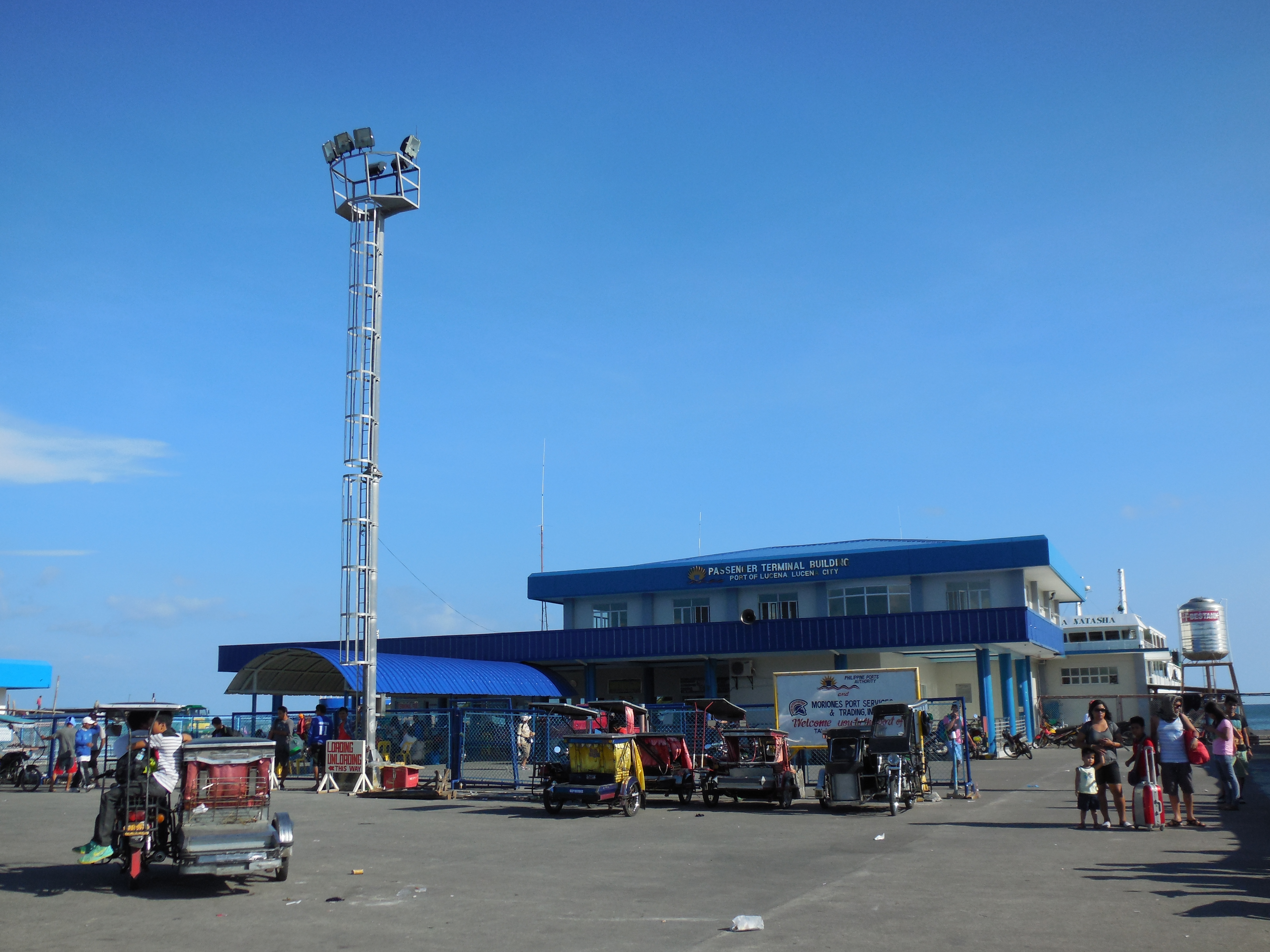
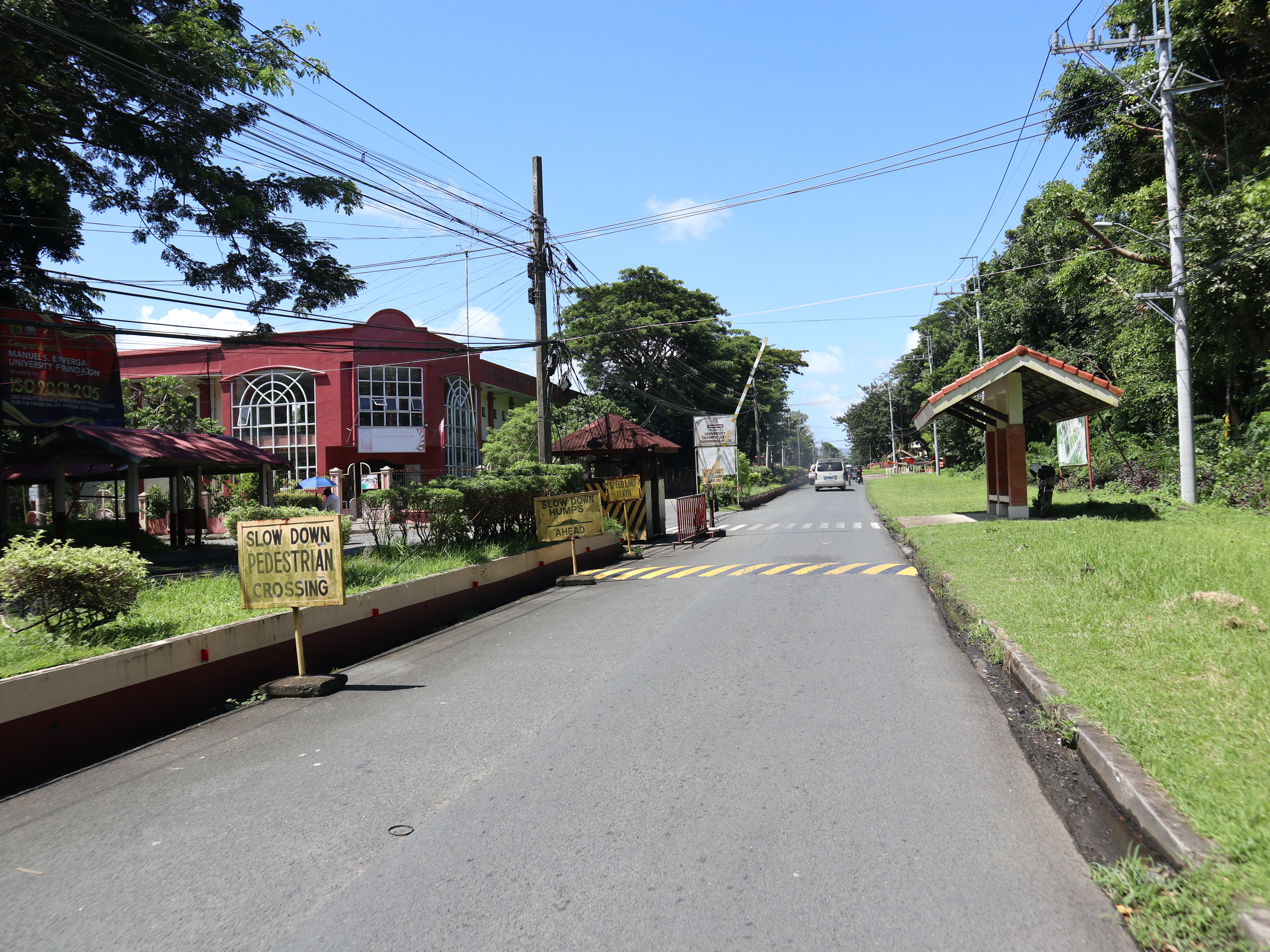
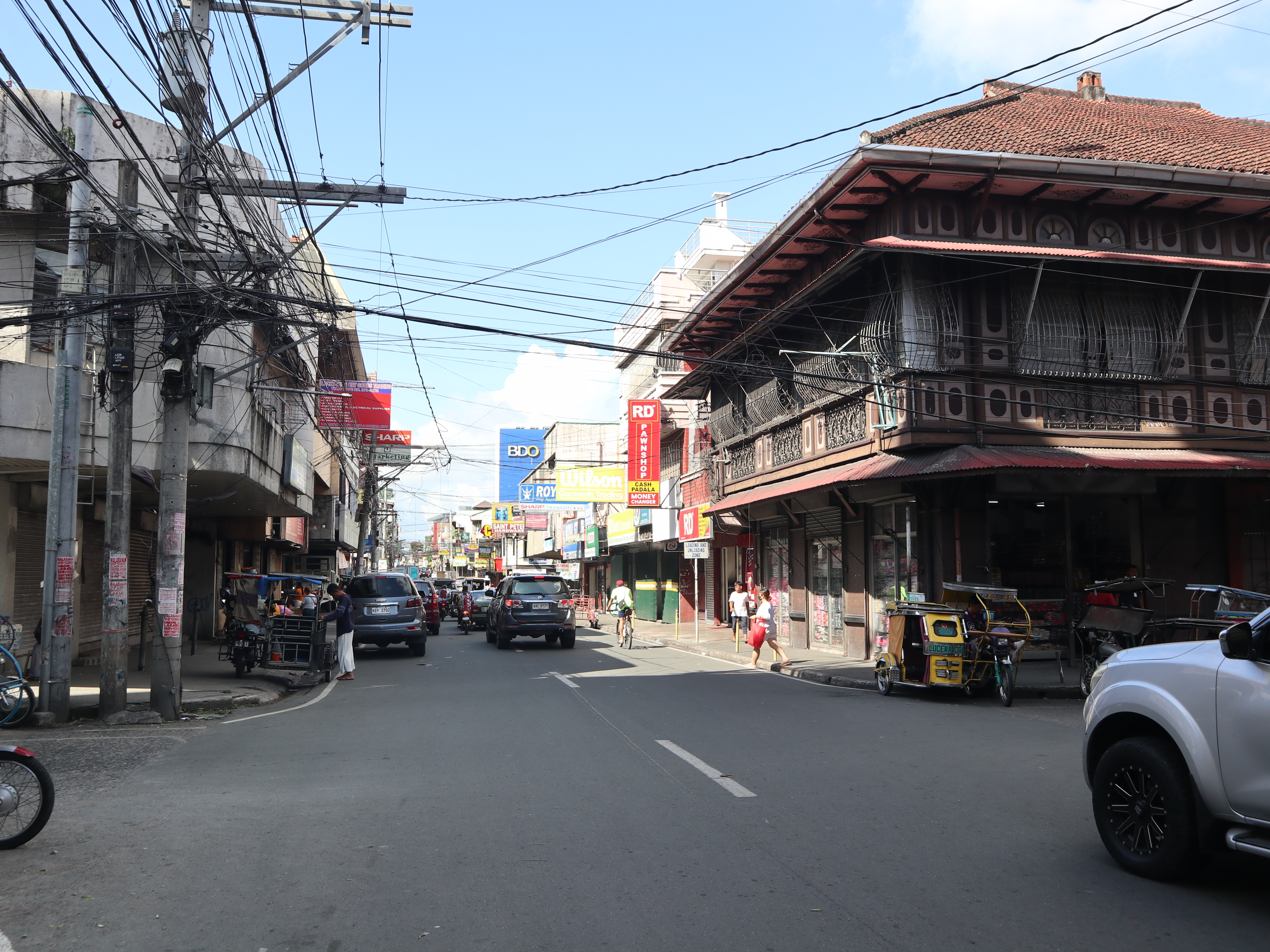
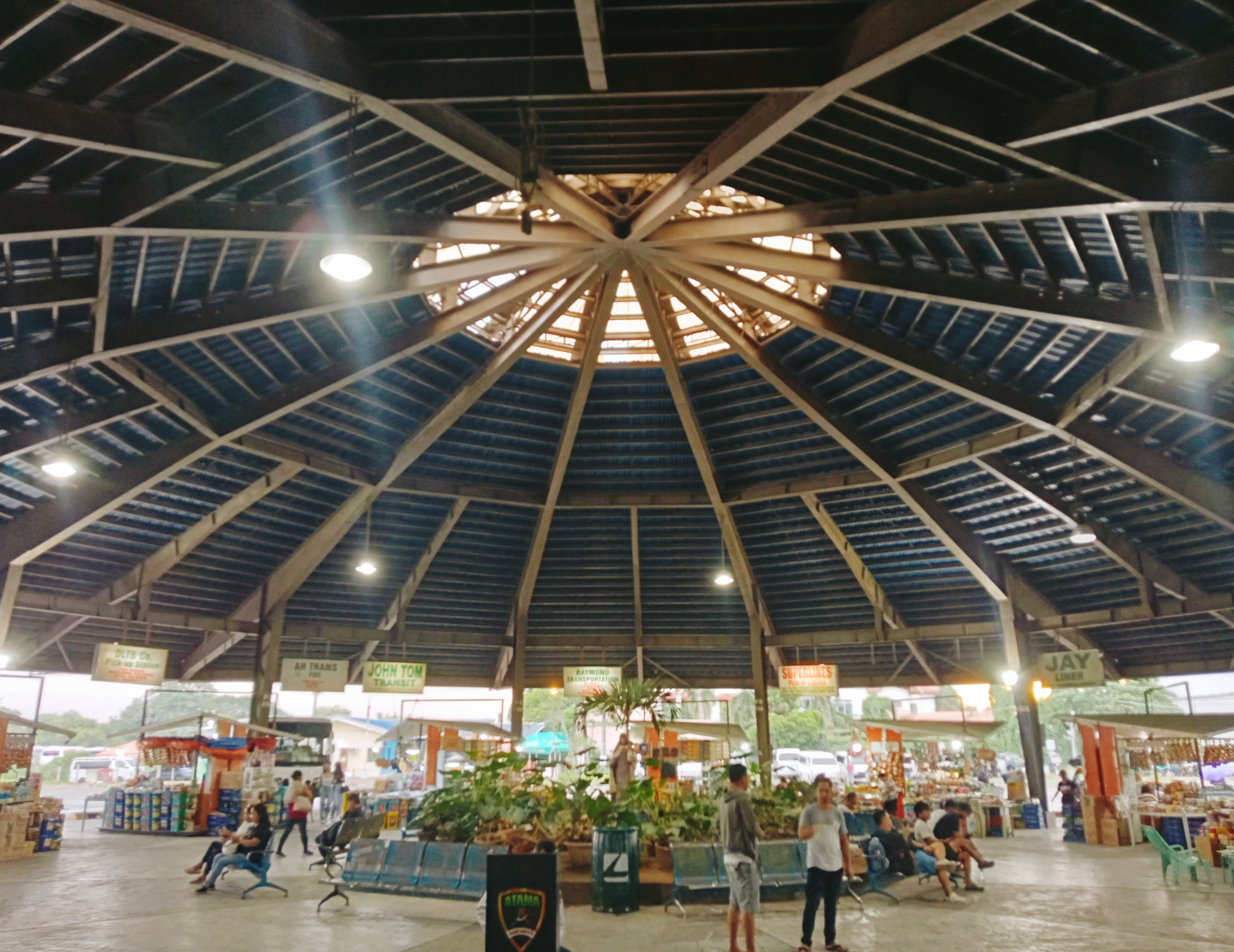
- Lucena City Hall St. Ferdinand Cathedral Quezon Provincial Capitol Port of Lucena MSEUF Campus Merchan Street Lucena Grand Central Terminal

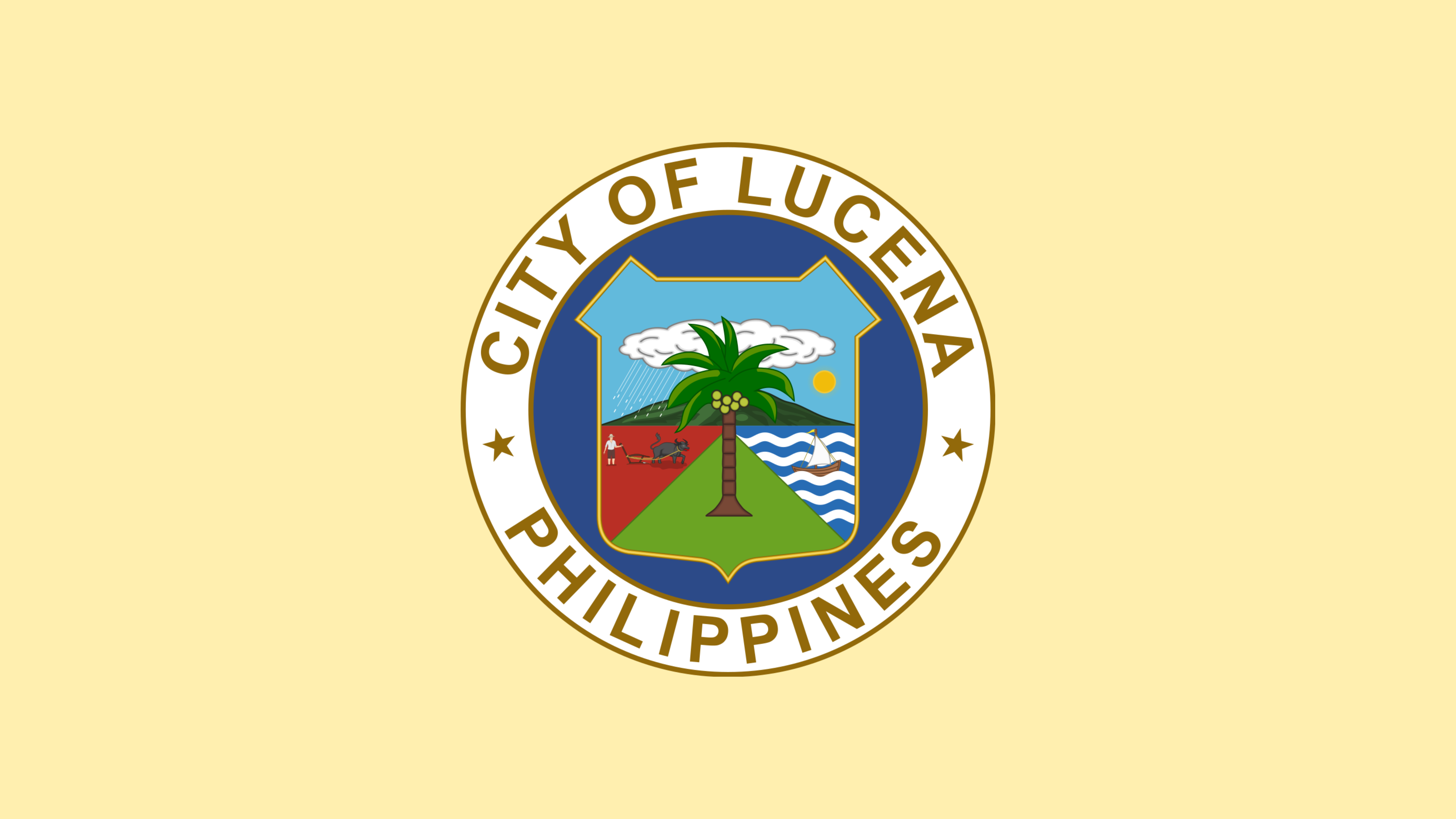
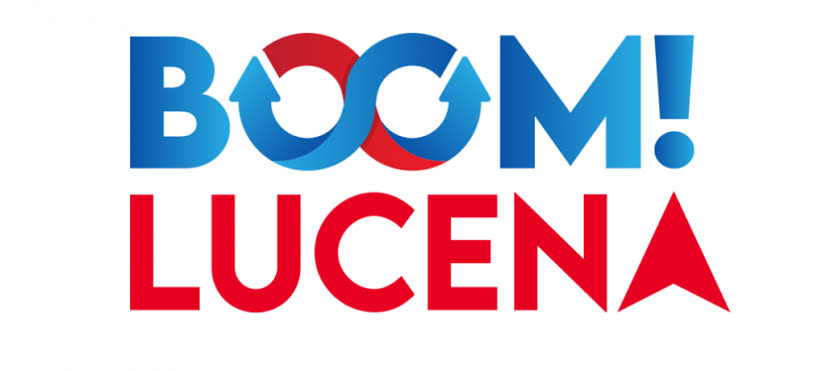
- Flag Seal Wordmark
- Anthem: Ang Lungsod ng Lucena
- Map of Calabarzon with Lucena highlighted
- Interactive map of Lucena
- Location within the Philippines
- Coordinates: 13°56′N 121°37′E
- Country: Philippines
- Region: Calabarzon
- Province: Quezon (Highly urbanized city. But, participating in the provincial government of Quezon)
- District: 2nd district
- Founded: November 3, 1879
- Cityhood (de jure): June 17, 1961
- Cityhood (de facto): August 20, 1961
- Highly urbanized city: July 1, 1991
- Named for: Lucena, Córdoba, Spain
- Barangays: 33 (see Barangays)

Government
  - Type: Sangguniang Panlungsod
  - Mayor: Mark Don Victor B. Alcala
  - Vice Mayor: Roderick "Dondon" Alcala
  - Representative: David C. Suarez
  - City Council: Members: Danilo B. Faller; Americo Q. Lacerna; Wilbert Mckinly L. Noche; Patrick Norman E. Nadera; Benito G. Brizuela Jr.; Jose Christian O. Ona; Elizabeth U. Sio; Ryan Caezar E. Alcala; Rhaetia Marie C. Abcede-Llaga; Edwin J. Pureza
  - Electorate: 199,416 voters (2025)

Area
  - Total: 80.21 km^{2} (30.97 sq mi)
- Elevation: 61 m (200 ft)
- Highest elevation: 1,687 m (5,535 ft)
- Lowest elevation: 0 m (0 ft)

Population (2024 census)
  - Total: 280,331
  - Density: 3,495/km^{2} (9,052/sq mi)
  - Households: 66,905
- Demonym: Lucenahin

Economy
  - Income class: 1st city income class
  - Poverty incidence: 4.8% (2023)
  - Revenue: ₱ 1,818 million (2024)
  - Assets: ₱ 3,850 million (2024)
  - Expenditure: ₱ 1,213 million (2024)
  - Liabilities: ₱ 1,801 million (2024)

Service provider
  - Electricity: Manila Electric Company (Meralco)
- Time zone: UTC+8 (PST)
- ZIP code: 4300, 4301
- PSGC: 0431200000
- IDD : area code: +63 (0)42
- Native languages: Tagalog
- Website: lucenacity.gov.ph

Lucena (Tagalog pronunciation: [lʊˈsɛna]), officially the City of Lucena (Filipino: Lungsod ng Lucena), is a highly urbanized city in the Calabarzon region of the Philippines. (Note: Under Batas Pambansa Blg. 337, or also known as the Local Government Code of 1983. The cities of General Santos, Mandaue, and Lucena were proclaimed as highly urbanized cities respectively on the following dates: September 5, 1988 (General Santos), February 15, 1991 (Mandaue), and July 1, 1991 (Lucena). No Presidential proclamation or even plebiscite was required, as it was under the old system. And the current Local Government Code of 1991 as mandated by the Republic Act 7160, later took effect on January 1, 1992.) According to 2024 census, it has a population of 280,331 people.

Lucena is the capital of Quezon and its largest urban center. Although geographically situated within the province, it is administratively independent and governed separately from the provincial government.

The city is a major center for commerce, healthcare, education, and government services in Quezon and the surrounding areas.

== History ==
=== Early history ===
In the 1570s, Captain Juan de Salcedo first explored what was then Kalilayan, later founded as a province in 1591. The Franciscan priests Juan de Plasencia and Diego de Oropesa founded its town between 1580 and 1583, also named "Tayabas". Tayabas City was organized by the Spaniards through the Franciscan missionaries, and Lucena was just one of its barrios. Tayabas became the provincial capital in 1749, renaming the province after it.

The Spaniards of the 16th century called the area "Buenavista" because of its scenic beauty; several years later, the barrio was renamed "Oroquieta". A century later, Muslim pirates began terrorizing the entire Philippine coastline, including Oroquieta. The barrio folks built forts along the seashores to defend it against the attacking pirates along the coast, particularly in the present-day Cotta and in Barangay Mayao, though these structures are no longer extant.

Hence, the place became known as Cotta, the Spanish form of the Tagalog kuta ('fort'). The growth of local maritime trade facilitated in the Cotta port and the final defeat of Moro pirates plying the Luzon and Visayan waters, afforded the growth of Lucena as a town which eventually led to its being the provincial capital of Tayabas in 1901.

Finally on November 3, 1879, a royal decree was issued and the Orden Superior Civil officially adopted the name "Lucena" in honor of a Spanish friar by the name of Father Mariano Granja, who came from Lucena, Córdoba in Andalucia, Spain. Fr. Granja was responsible for the development of the barrio that became a Parish in 1881. Lucena became an independent municipality on June 1, 1882.

During the 1896 Philippine Revolution, the people of Lucena showed their brand of patriotism. Jorge Zaballero led the local revolutionists who were under the barrage of Spanish muskets. Later, Miguel Arguilles with Jose Barcelona as president formed a revolutionary government in Lucena.

After Aguinaldo proclaimed the nation's independence on June 12, 1898, Gen. Miguel Malvar, as Commanding General for Southern Luzon, took over Tayabas province on August 15, 1898. Don Crisanto Marquez became Lucena's first elected Municipal president during the first Philippine Republic.

=== Philippine–American War ===
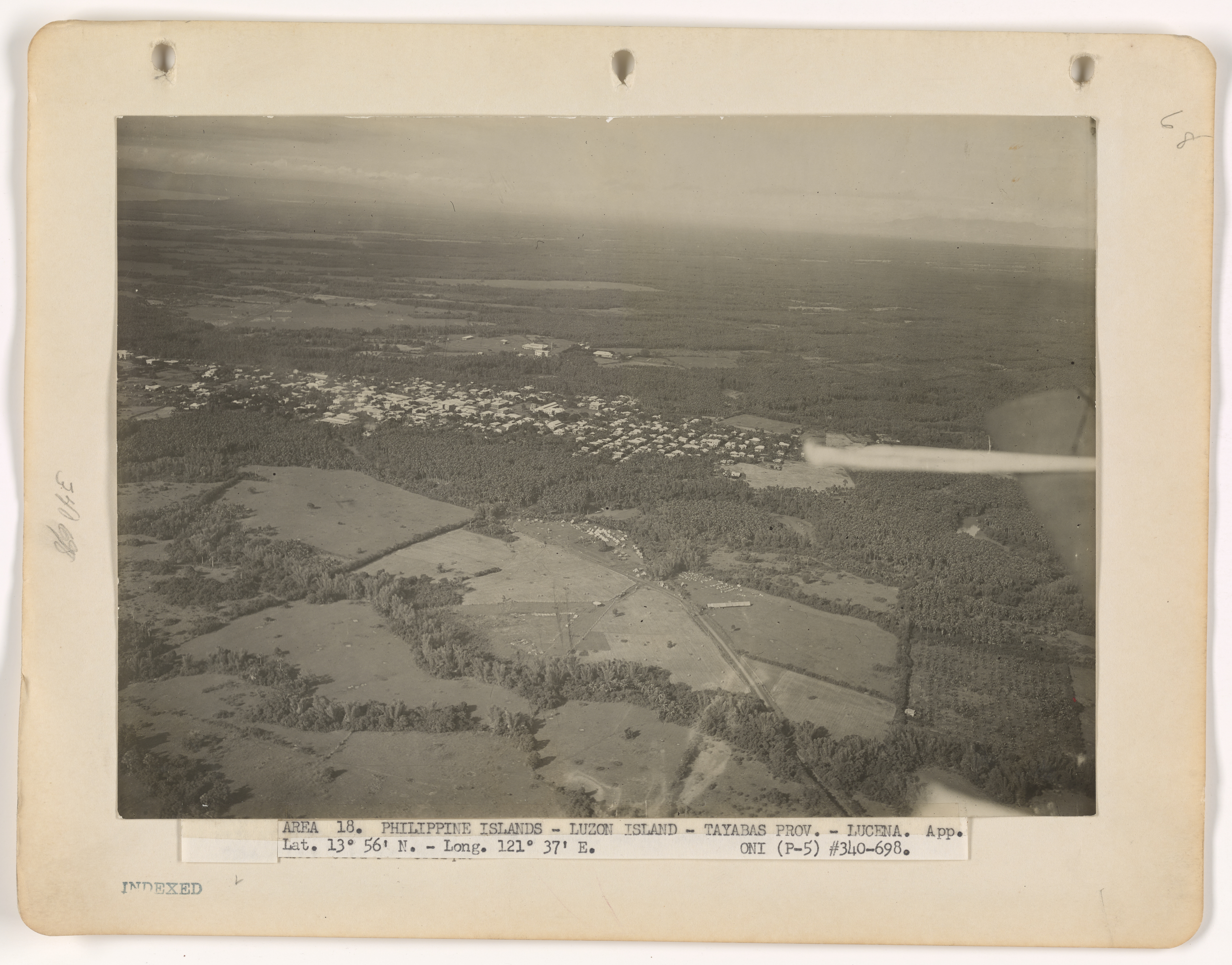
Aerial view of Lucena, c. 1930s—40s

Lucena was involved in the Philippine–American War and in the subsequent establishment of American civil governance in the country.

As the war between the United States and Filipino forces intensified, Lucena became an important strategic location, though it did not become a major battlefield.

In 1901, after the suppression of Filipino resistance, the Americans began reorganizing the local governance structure. This led to the eventual transfer of the provincial capital of Tayabas to Lucena on March 12, 1901. This shift was an important step in strengthening American control over the region and setting up civil governance.

The Americans valued Lucena's central location. It's accessibility and proximity to other towns in the province made it an ideal choice as the new administrative center.

During this time, Lucena saw further development with the introduction of newer infrastructure such as roads, schools, and government facilities, which contributed to the city's growth and modernization.

=== World War II ===
On December 27, 1941, the Imperial Japanese forces captured the city of Lucena, an event locally known as "The Fall of Lucena," just 19 days after their initial invasion of the Philippines. The Japanese aimed to strengthen their military presence in the region, sending units to seize strategic locations within the town. Although the invasion was initially successful, the Japanese forces soon faced fierce resistance from local fighters and members of the Hunters ROTC, a group of Filipino guerilla fighters.

The underground resistance movement was tenacious. Japanese Forces would be caught off-guard with surprise assaults which often resulted in fierce close-quarters combat. These continuous assaults, coupled with significant logistical challenges, gradually took a heavy toll on the Japanese forces, undermining their control and weakening their presence in the region.

By January 25, 1945, the Hunters ROTC guerrillas had managed to penetrate the town. Leveraging their intimate knowledge of the local terrain, they moved swiftly to prevent the Japanese forces from organizing an effective defense. After a fierce and hard-fought offensive, the Filipino forces successfully expelled the Japanese from the city. In the aftermath, the people of Lucena strengthened their defenses in anticipation of a potential counterattack.

Later attempts by the Japanese to re-establish their occupation of Lucena failed.

Tayabas Province stood by and waited for the American liberation forces and the Philippine Commonwealth troops, who would soon hand them their freedom on April 4, 1945.

Shortly after the war, Lucena began to rebuild, with efforts focused on restoring its infrastructure and reviving local industries.

=== Cityhood ===
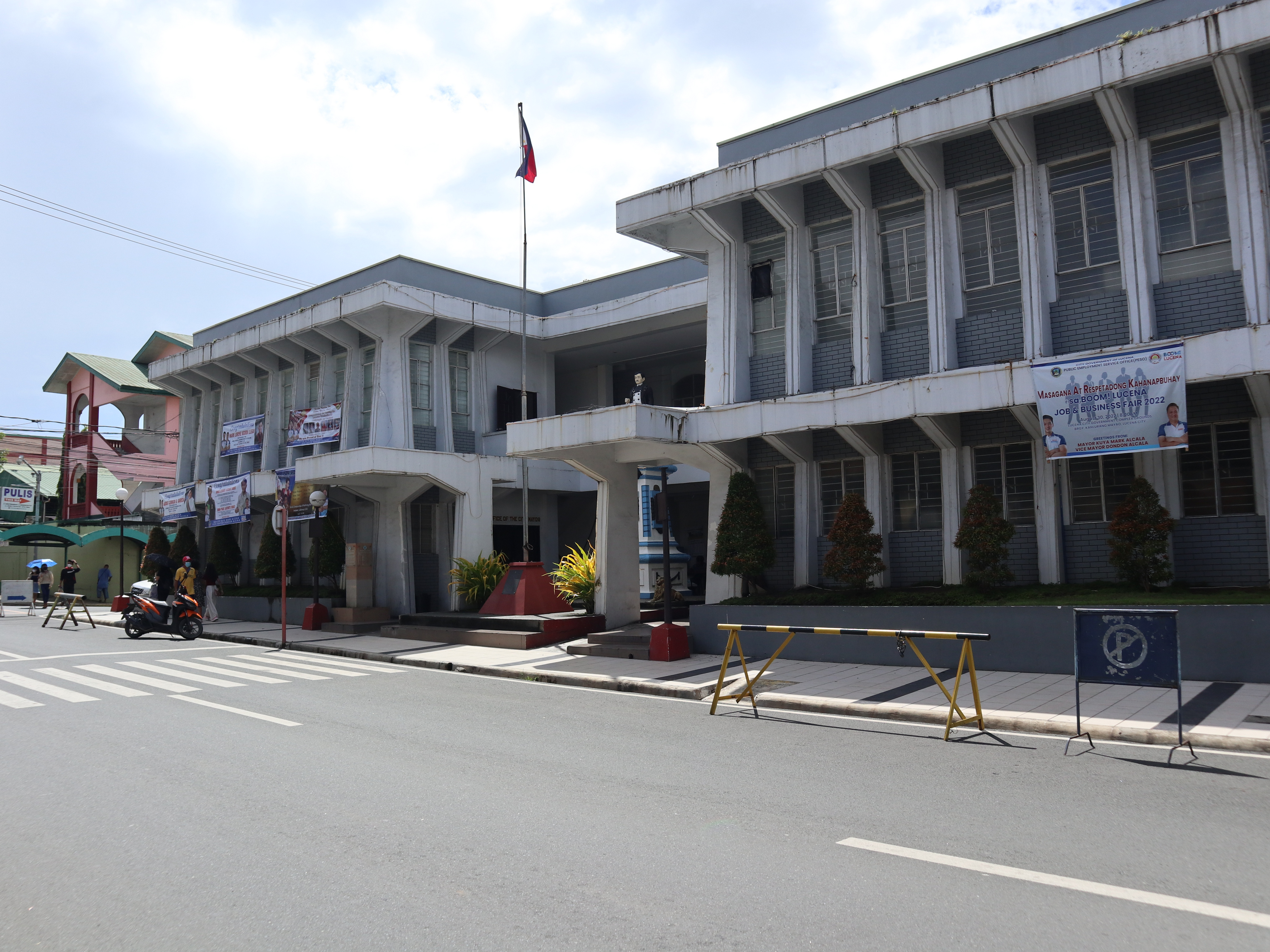
Old Lucena City Hall

Lucena was granted cityhood through the efforts of Congressman Manuel S. Enverga of Quezon's 1st district. Republic Act No. 3271 lapsed into law on June 17, 1961, despite not being signed by President Carlos P. Garcia. The city's formal inauguration and the induction of its first city officials, led by Mayor Castro Profugo, took place on August 20, 1961, as outlined in Section 90 of the Act.

On July 1, 1991, Lucena was officially declared a highly urbanized city, granting it political and administrative independence from the province. Pursuant to the Department of the Interior and Local Government (DILG) Certification dated May 13, 2026, which formally affirms that the City of Lucena retains its status as a component city of the Province of Quezon due to a lack of a presidential proclamation and a plebiscite, both the city's total population count and land area parameters are legally integrated and accounted for in the official computation of the province's revenue shares and resource allocations. (Note: Reverting or reclassifying a city which already proclaimed, respected, and recognized as a "Highly urbanized city" into a regular component city is actually not being permitted by Article X of the 1987 Constitution and even in any sections of the Local Government Code of 1991. Just like what Cebu City officials attempted in the past, they tried to revert their city from being an HUC back down to being a component city of Cebu Province once again. To allow the registered voters of their city to contribute more votes against the so-called Sugbuak back in 2005, which proposes to divide the island province of Cebu later in 2007. But the lawyers told the Cebu City officials that there is no provision in the law that permits the said reversion. Apparently, the proposal of Sugbuak hopefully never happened. And it is clear that the HUC status is somehow made irreversible by the laws. Therefore, the city government of Lucena has the right to insist on its HUC status, and to stand for its own kind of political position.) In May 2014, a fire destroyed the Lucena City Public Market; a new two-storey market building opened in October 2016. In October 2019, the Department of Public Works and Highways opened a 472-metre underpass in Barangay Gulang-gulang to help ease traffic congestion.

== Geography ==
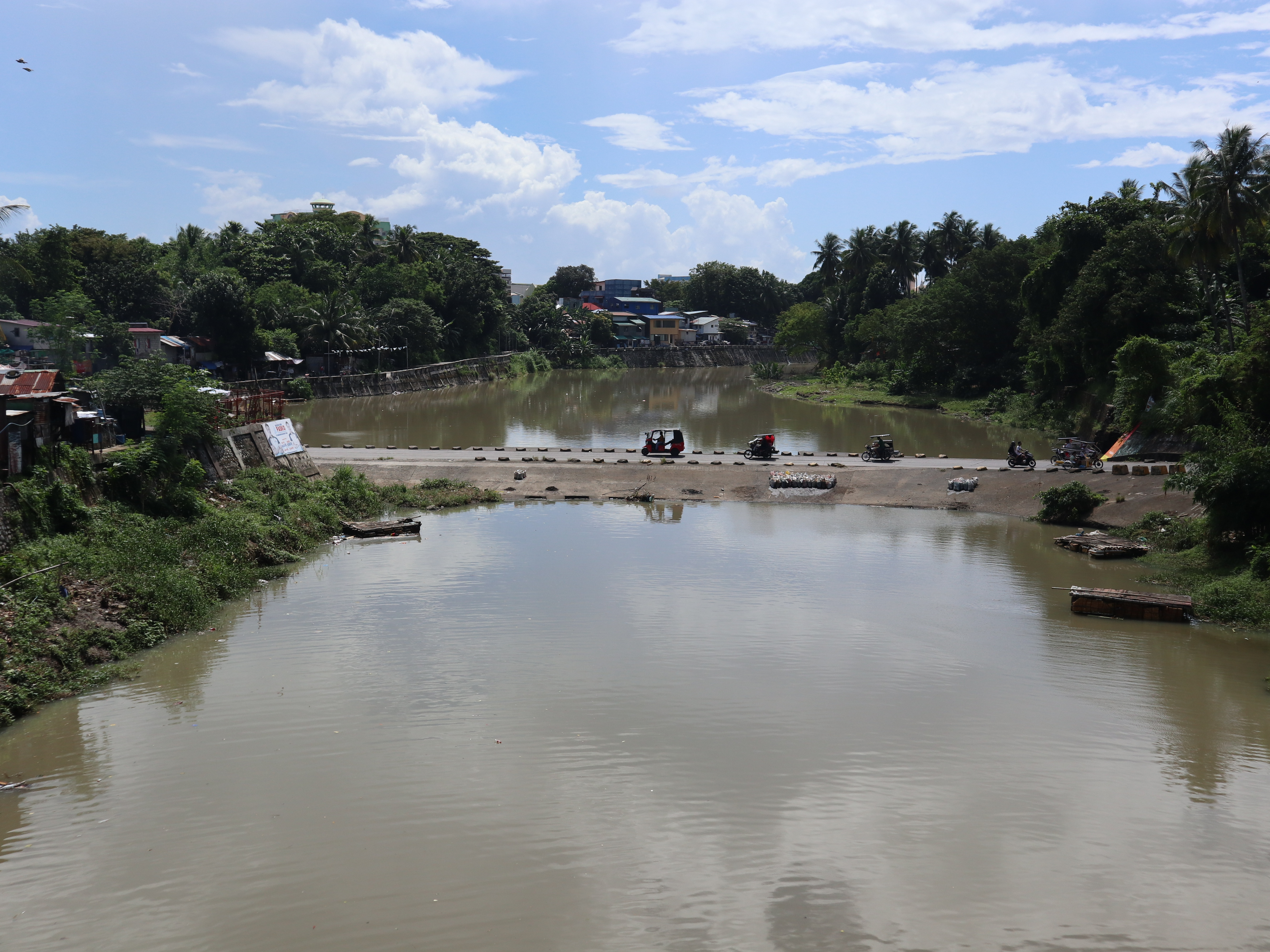
Iyam River

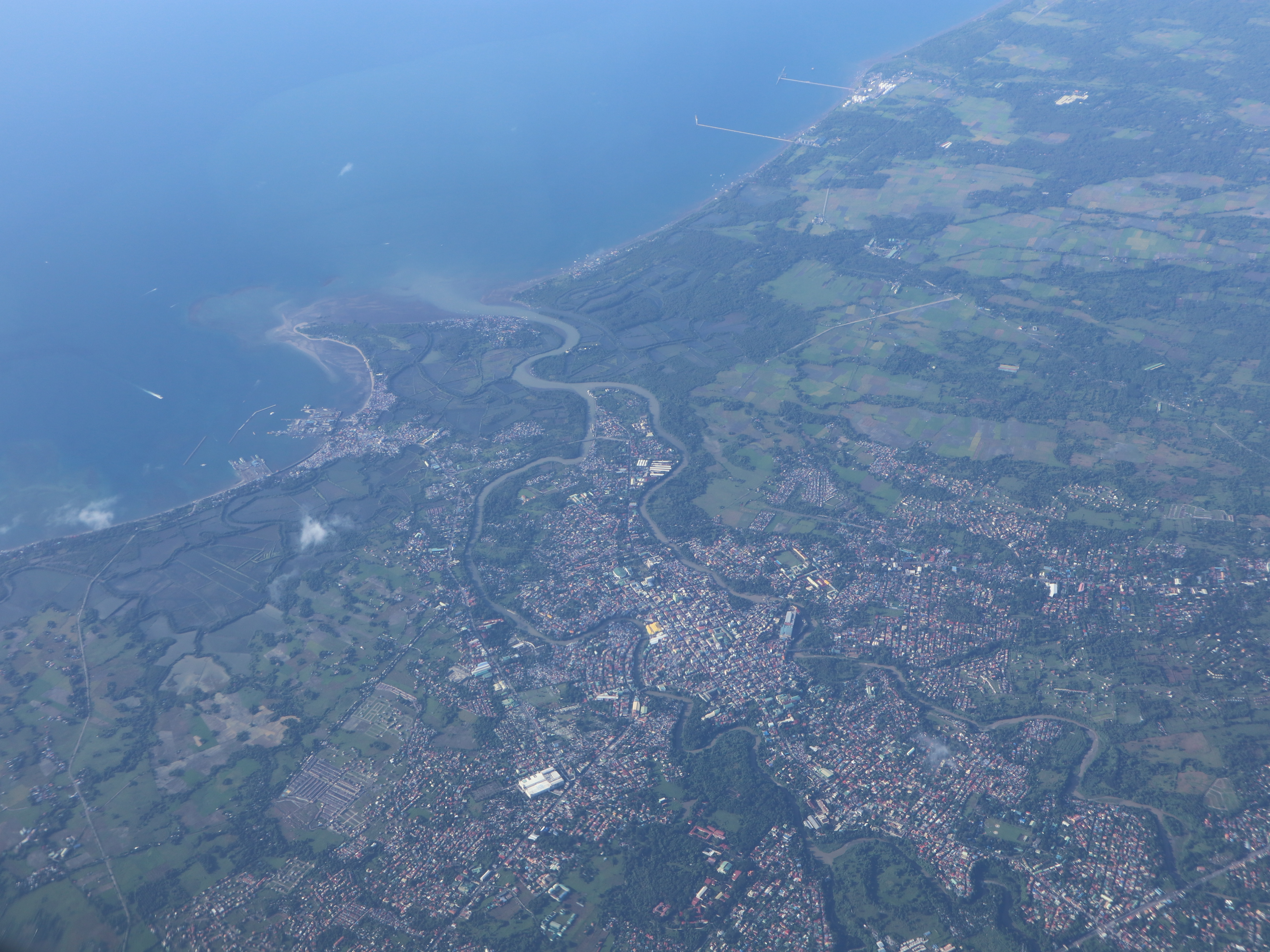
Lucena from air

Lucena is situated 130 kilometers (81 mi) south of Manila. The city proper is wedged between two rivers, Dumacaa River on the east and Iyam River on the west. Seven other rivers and six creeks serve as natural drainage for the city. Its port on the coast along Tayabas Bay is home to several boat and ferry lines operating and serving the sea lanes between Lucena and the different points in the region and as far as the Visayas.

Being the provincial capital and former Government Center of the former Southern Tagalog Region, Lucena is host to most of the branches of governmental agencies, businesses, banks and service facilities in the Southern Tagalog region.

=== Barangays ===
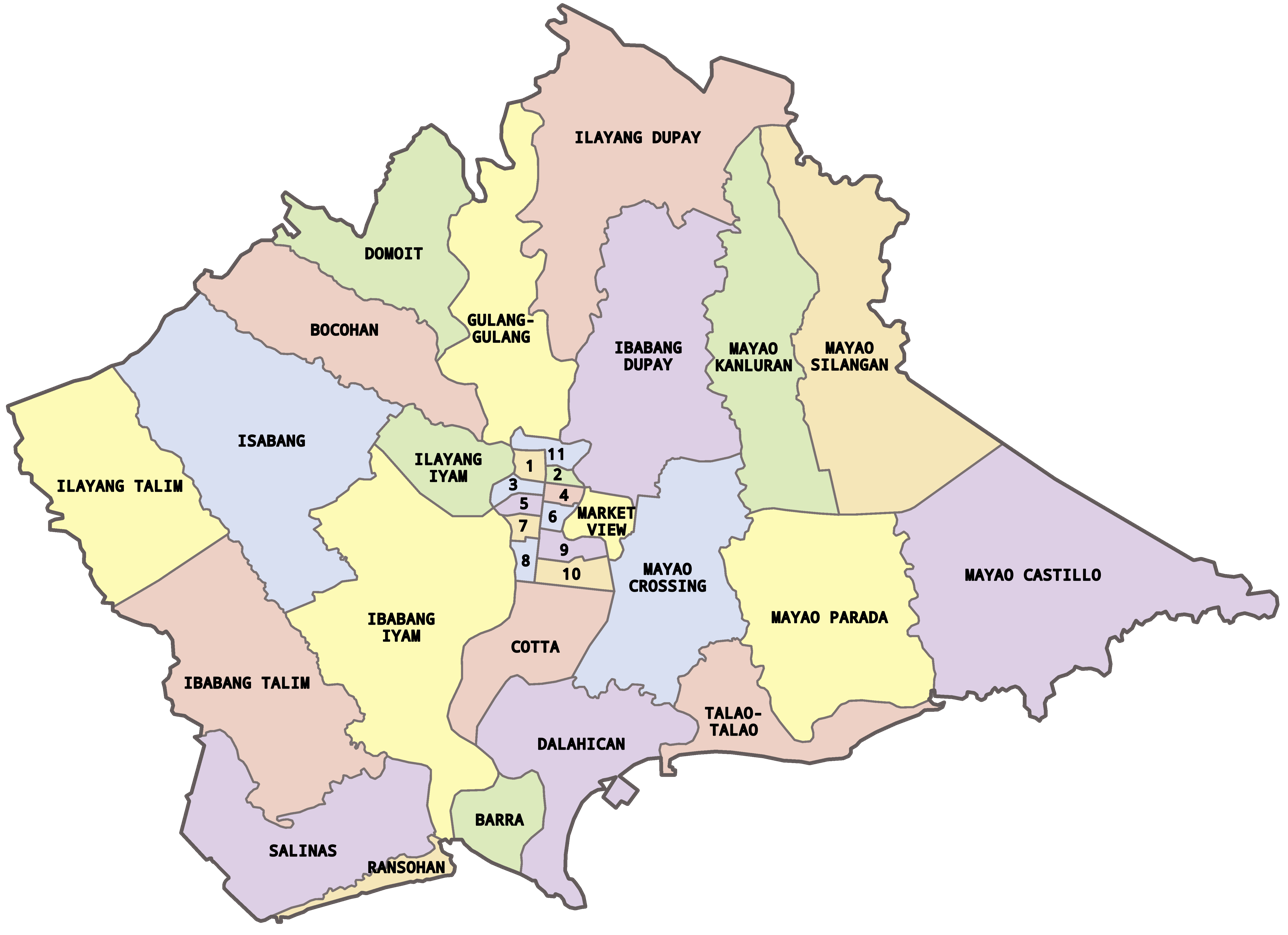
Political Subdivisions of Lucena City

Lucena is politically subdivided into 33 barangays, as indicated below. Each barangay consists of puroks and some have sitios.

- Barangay 1 (Poblacion)
- Barangay 2 (Poblacion)
- Barangay 3 (Poblacion)
- Barangay 4 (Poblacion)
- Barangay 5 (Poblacion)
- Barangay 6 (Poblacion)
- Barangay 7 (Poblacion)
- Barangay 8 (Poblacion)
- Barangay 9 (Poblacion)
- Barangay 10 (Poblacion)
- Barangay 11 (Poblacion)
- Barra
- Bocohan
- Cotta
- Gulang-Gulang
- Dalahican
- Domoit
- Ibabang Dupay
- Ibabang Iyam
- Ibabang Talim
- Ilayang Dupay
- Ilayang Iyam
- Ilayang Talim
- Isabang
- Market View
- Mayao Castillo
- Mayao Crossing
- Mayao Kanluran
- Mayao Parada
- Mayao Silangan
- Ransohan
- Salinas
- Talao-Talao

=== Climate ===
Climate data for Lucena
Month	Jan	Feb	Mar	Apr	May	Jun	Jul	Aug	Sep	Oct	Nov	Dec	Year
Mean daily maximum °C (°F)	28 (82)	28 (82)	30 (86)	32 (90)	32 (90)	32 (90)	31 (88)	31 (88)	31 (88)	30 (86)	29 (84)	28 (82)	30 (86)
Mean daily minimum °C (°F)	22 (72)	22 (72)	23 (73)	24 (75)	24 (75)	24 (75)	24 (75)	24 (75)	23 (73)	23 (73)	23 (73)	23 (73)	23 (74)
Average rainfall mm (inches)	146.2 (5.76)	118.9 (4.68)	89.1 (3.51)	75.6 (2.98)	170.8 (6.72)	188.7 (7.43)	258.9 (10.19)	193.3 (7.61)	227.3 (8.95)	373.7 (14.71)	425.3 (16.74)	483.6 (19.04)	2,751.4 (108.32)
Average rainy days	22	16	14	10	16	18	20	20	21	24	26	26	233
Source: World Weather Online

Lucena falls under Type III of the Corona's climatic classification system. It is characterized by no pronounced wet and dry seasons. Generally, the wet season is from June to November and sometimes extends up to December when the southwest monsoon is predominant. The dry season is from January to May but is sometimes interrupted by erratic rainfall. The annual mean temperature is 27 °C (81 °F), with February as the coldest month with temperatures dropping to 20 °C (68 °F), and May as the warmest month with temperatures reaching up to 35 °C (95 °F). Habagat monsoon winds pass through the province from June to October while northeasterly winds or Amihan blows through the islands from December to February.

== Demographics ==
Population census of Lucena

Year	Pop.	±% p.a.
1903	9,375	—
1918	12,108	+1.72%
1939	21,675	+2.81%
1948	33,092	+4.81%
1960	49,264	+3.37%
1970	77,006	+4.56%

Year	Pop.	±% p.a.
1975	92,336	+3.71%
1980	107,880	+3.16%
1990	150,624	+3.39%
1995	177,750	+3.15%
2000	196,075	+2.13%
2007	236,390	+2.61%

Year	Pop.	±% p.a.
2010	246,392	+1.52%
2015	266,248	+1.49%
2020	278,924	+0.98%
2024	280,331	+0.12%

Source: Philippine Statistics Authority

=== Language ===
The majority of residents in Lucena, Quezon speak Tagalog, that has distinct form of Tayabas Tagalog variety, which is locally known as Lucenahin speech.

This Tayabasin dialect serves as the primary mother tongue and everyday language of native Lucenahins and exhibits noticeable differences from the standard Manila Tagalog (the basis of Filipino) in vocabulary, pronunciation, and some grammatical features. It shares many characteristics with other Southern Tagalog varieties and preserves a number of archaic lexical items and phonological patterns that have largely disappeared from the Manila-based standard.

Lucena's distinct linguistic identity and heritage are documented in the Lexicographic Study of Tayabas Tagalog of Quezon Province by Manuel E. Arsenio (1971) and in the 2002 dictionary Diksyunaryo ng mga Salitang Lucenahin by A. O. Balagtas, which catalogues numerous terms unique to the city or preferentially used there. Examples include:

- dag‑im – a dark, rain-bearing cloud (standard Tagalog ulap or ulap na ulan)
- guyabnan – handrail or banister of a staircase (cf. standard hawakan sa hagdan or barandilya)
- panhik – to go upstairs (still used in Lucena, but largely replaced by akyat in Manila Tagalog)

These features highlight Lucena’s retention of older Southern Tagalog forms, making its speech one of the more conservative varieties of Tagalog still actively spoken in CALABARZON.

== Economy ==
Poverty incidence of Lucena (%)

Source: Philippine Statistics Authority

=== Retail and commerce ===
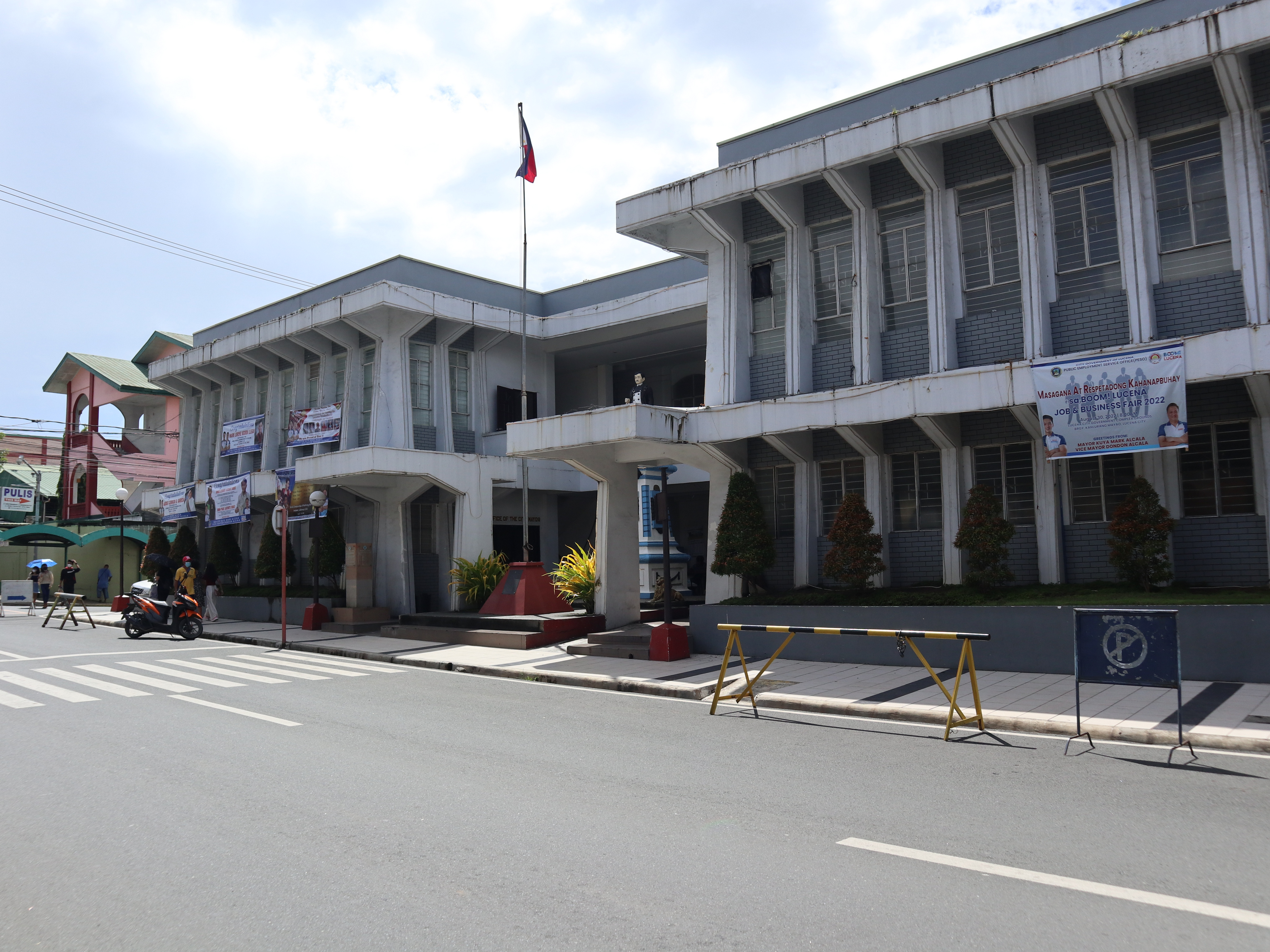
Downtown Lucena

SM City Lucena shopping mall in Ibabang Dupay

Economic activities in Lucena are heavily concentrated in the poblacion and other suburban barangays where the highly dense and constricted central business district (CBD) is home to a large cluster of different business enterprises. As population grows in tandem with new and promising business prospects, business activities spill over adjoining barangays, thus forming mini satellite commercial areas.

Other commercial strips are located in the poblacion and suburban barangays where both retail and wholesale trade, including other essential services, are being engaged in. Lucena City features SM City Lucena, the biggest mall in the city located in Ibabang Dupay, which is also one of the first SM Malls in Luzon. Other Shopping Centers include Pacific Mall Lucena (Metro Gaisano Mall), SM Savemore Agora, and Puregold Gulang-Gulang Lucena.

=== Industries ===
Big factories and warehouses are present in these suburban barangays like San Miguel Brewery, Coca-Cola Bottlers Philippines, Inc., PepsiCo Philippines, Inc., Asia Brewery, Inc. Nestlé Philippines, and Ginebra San Miguel, Inc. (formerly La Tondeña Distillers Inc.), do business in sales, distribution, and transport of assorted business products in bulk.

Of the total 8,316.90 ha (20,551.5 acres) land area of Lucena City, 19.86% or 1,651.77 hectares (4,081.6 acres) cover the existing built-up area. Almost 0.56% of this or 46.62 hectares (115.2 acres) cover the industrial section, located in different barangays of the city. These areas are home to significant industrial and manufacturing activities.

Industry in Lucena produces a sustainable amount of agro-industrial-based products, dried and smoked fish, distilled liquors, bamboo and rattan furniture, ornamental flowers/plants, vegetable as well as meat products.

Lucena is also known as the "Cocopalm City of the South". Nestled midst a wide expanse of coconut lands, Lucena has coconut oil mills which produce oil-based household products like cooking oil, soap, lard, margarine, and oil-based medicines. Exora Cooking Oil and Vegetable Lard and Miyami Cooking Oil are among those made in this city. Tantuco Industries, JnJ Oil Industries, Inc., and Monaco Oil Company are some of the well-known coconut oil companies in the city.

Car assembly and manufacturing plants have also established in the city, while Manila-based car shops are starting to put up some branches like Toyota-Lucena, Isuzu-Lucena, Mitsubishi Lucena (Borromeo Motoring Group), and Foton Motor.

San Pedro Shipping Yard, a subsidiary of MSLI, is also located in Dalahican.

== Places of interest ==
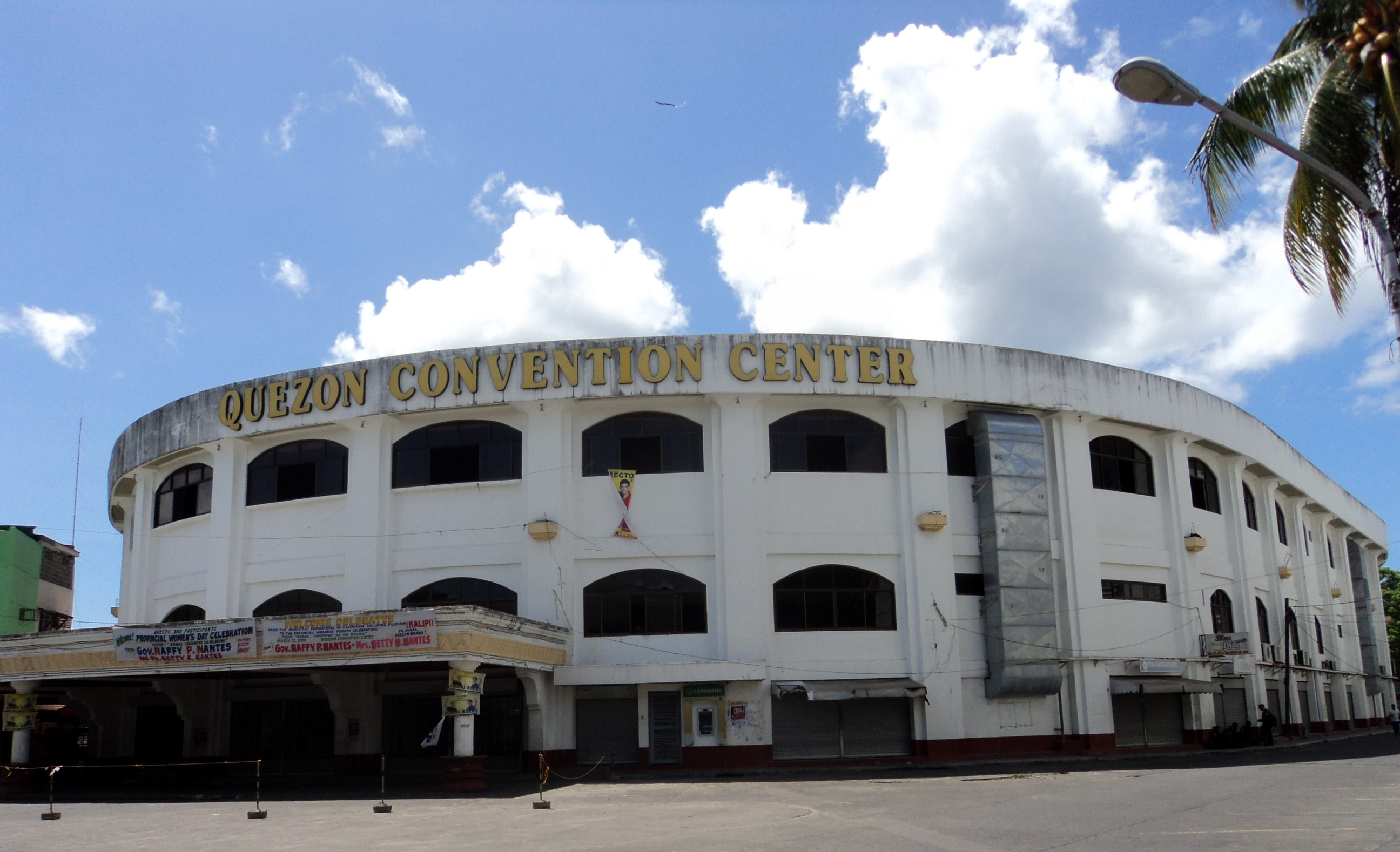
Quezon Convention Center

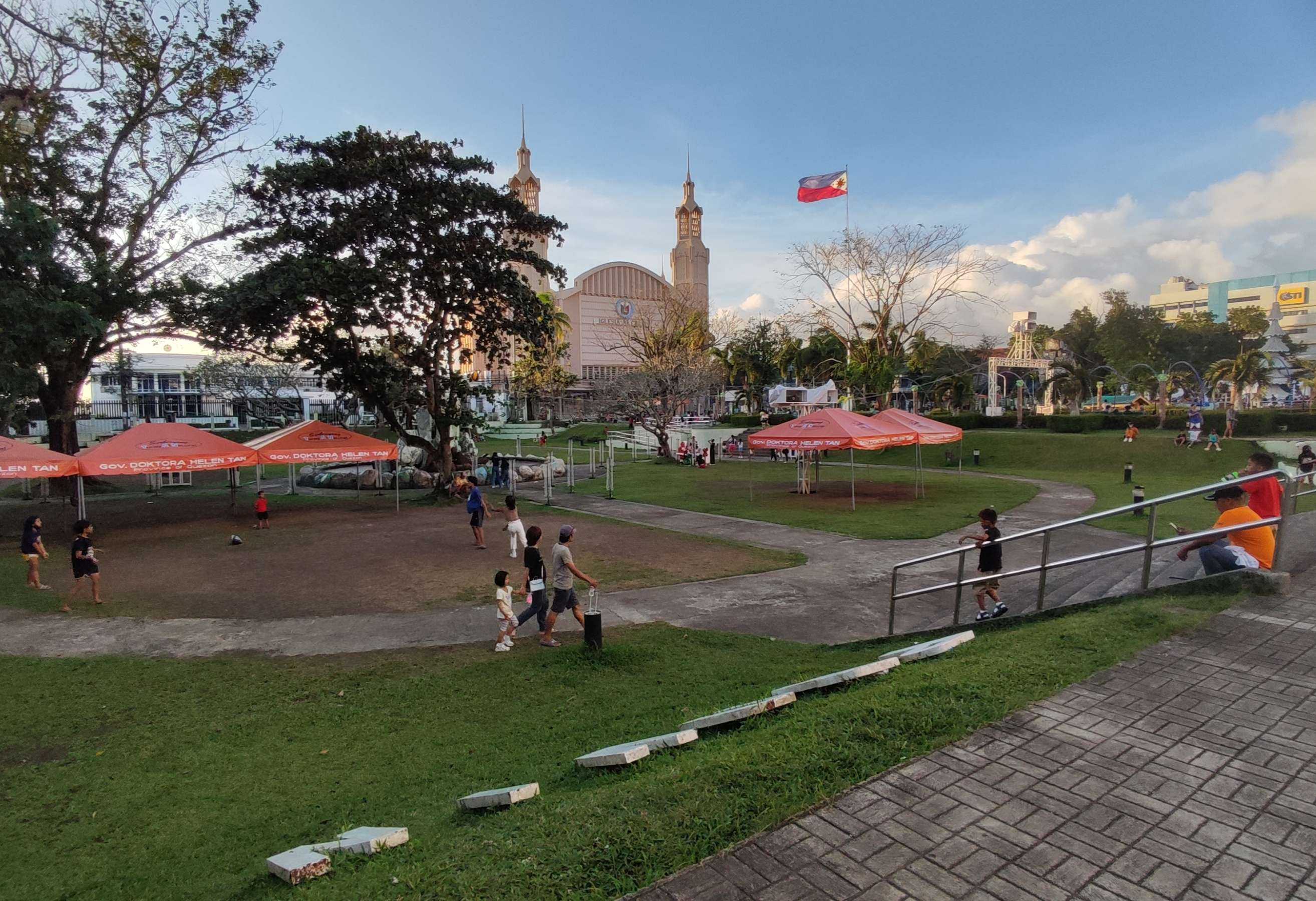
Perez Park

Lucena attracts a number of people thanks to its modern amenities, cultural landmarks, and strong transportation infrastructure. Well-connected by an extensive road network, the city is easily accessible from all major cities and towns in Luzon. A series of well-paved radial and bypass routes crisscross the area, facilitating the smooth flow of goods and services across the region, ensuring that the transport of merchandise, supplies, and raw materials happens efficiently around the clock. This robust connectivity supports Lucena's position as a key commercial and logistical hub in the region.

Among the city's most notable attractions is the Quezon Convention Center, a venue that has played host to a variety of high-profile events. This includes the 2004 SEABA Under-18 Championship qualifying tournament, which served as a qualifier for the 2004 FIBA Asia Under-18 Championship in India. The convention center is meant to highlight Lucena's ability to accommodate international and regional conferences, exhibitions, and sporting events.

Lucena is also home to several sports complexes. The Kalilayan Civic Centre and Sentro Pastoral Auditorium are popular for hosting a wide range of community and cultural events. The Alcala Sports Complex has hosted the Palarong Pambansa twice; first in 1976 and again in 1989, solidifying its place in the history of national sports events. The Manuel S. Enverga University Foundation Gymnasium, Sacred Heart College Gymnasium, and Marcial Punzalan Gymnasium further add to the city’s sporting infrastructure, providing spaces for local athletic events and recreational activities.

Another cultural site is the Lucena Cockpit Arena. It is a key venue for traditional Filipino cockfighting, which remains a popular and longstanding cultural activity in the region. The arena offers visitors a chance to experience this time-honored Filipino tradition in a regulated setting.

The Lucena City Government Complex is another significant landmark in the city. The hub houses various government offices and serves as the center of political activity in Lucena. It plays a key role in the governance and public service delivery of the city.

=== Cultural and civic landmarks ===
- Quezon Convention Center
- Lucena City Promenade (Bonifacio Drive)
- PNR Lucena Station
- Port of Lucena

=== Religious and spiritual sites ===
- Saint Ferdinand Cathedral
- St. Jude Thaddeus Parish & Diocesan Shrine
- Our Lady of Lourdes Parish Church
- St. Isidore Labrador Parish Church
- St. Raphael Archangel Parish Church
- Holy Face of Jesus Parish Church
- Our Lady of Penafrancia Church

=== Historical sites, heritage structures, and ancestral homes ===
- Cabana Ancestral House
- Calixto (Zaballero) Ancestral House
- Farmacia Chionglo
- Governor's Mansion
- Granja Panciteria
- Old Carlos Superdrug

=== Parks and eco-tourism sites ===
- Lucena Botanical Garden and Arboretum
- Perez Park
- Quezon National Park
- Talaba Eco Park

== Culture ==
=== Festivals and celebrations ===
The city features various celebrations, and one of the most prominent is the festival of Pasayahan in Lucena.

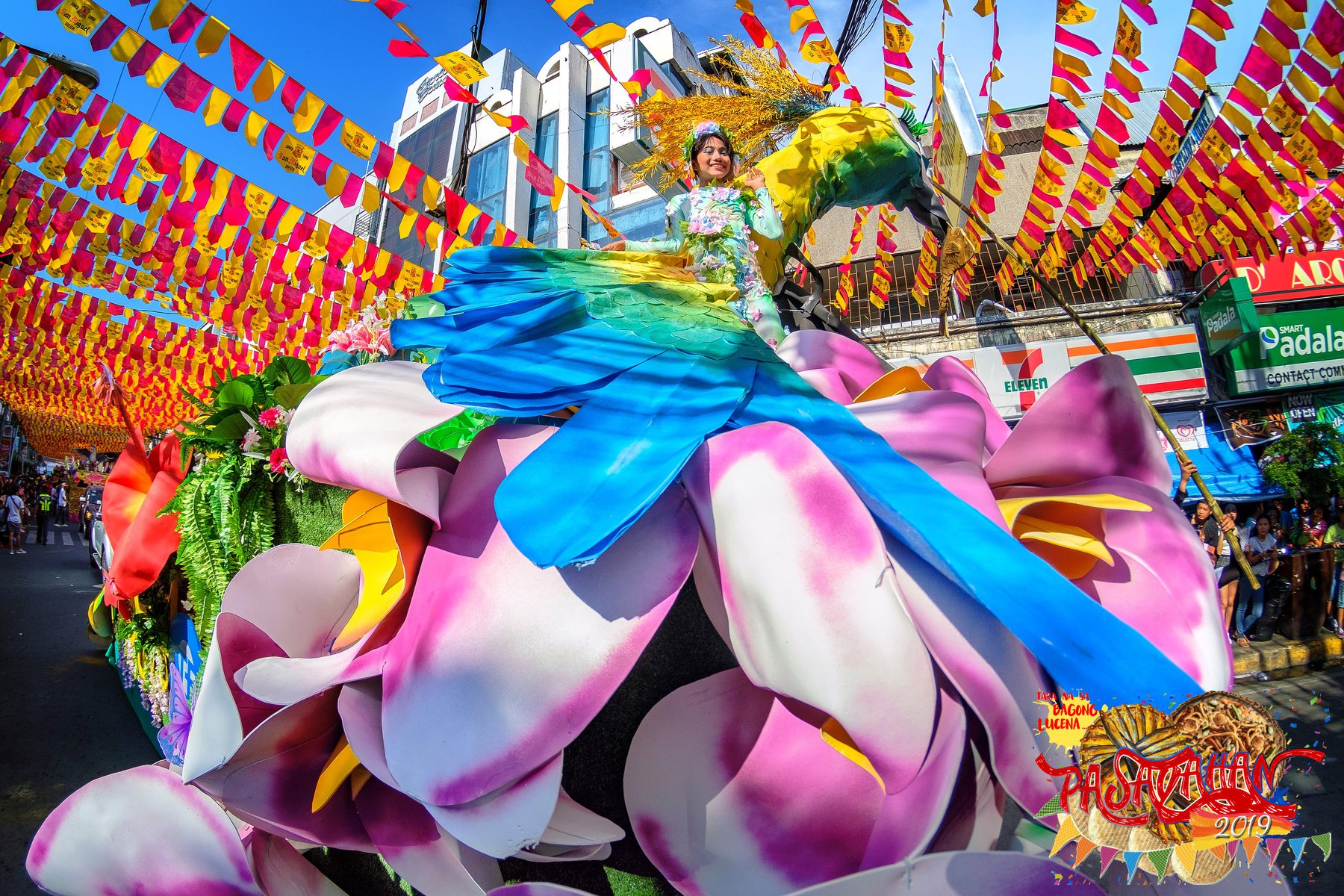
Pasayahan sa Lucena Grand Parade

A 28-second sample of the festival song of Pasayahan sa Lucena.

Pasayahan sa Lucena is a secular festival conceptualized to showcase the natural and ecological interrelationship and independence between nature and man. This local festival is managed and hosted by the local government unit of Lucena. It also promotes the ways of life inherent among the people of Lucena. Entertainment, cuisine, social drinking, dancing, live music, arts, and other leisure activities are traditionally included in the Pasayahan Festival.

The Grand Parade of Pasayahan, also known as Mardi Gras among the city’s more senior residents, is the main highlight of the Pasayahan. It features a parade of vibrant floats made by the participating businesses and groups, as well as street dancing, marching bands, a Pandong (hat) competition, and a gay-friendly Carnival Queen competition.

Pasayahan sa Lucena 2013 Grand Parade passing by SM City Lucena

After the first Pasayahan in 1987, the parade has become an annual affair. Year after year, the Pasayahan draws a large crowd. Pasayahan features the Chami Festival to promote Lucena’s own native delicacies, the chami and tinapa. Other features, such as the Binibining Pasayahan, a street fashion show, a talent competition, and other street concerts, take the stage in Pasayahan. Originally intended as three days of spirited merrymaking in the streets, the event has become a weeklong to monthlong tourist attraction.

The celebration also coincides with the Feast of St. Ferdinand, one of the patrons of the Catholic churches in Lucena, celebrated every 30 May.

== Government ==
=== Local government ===
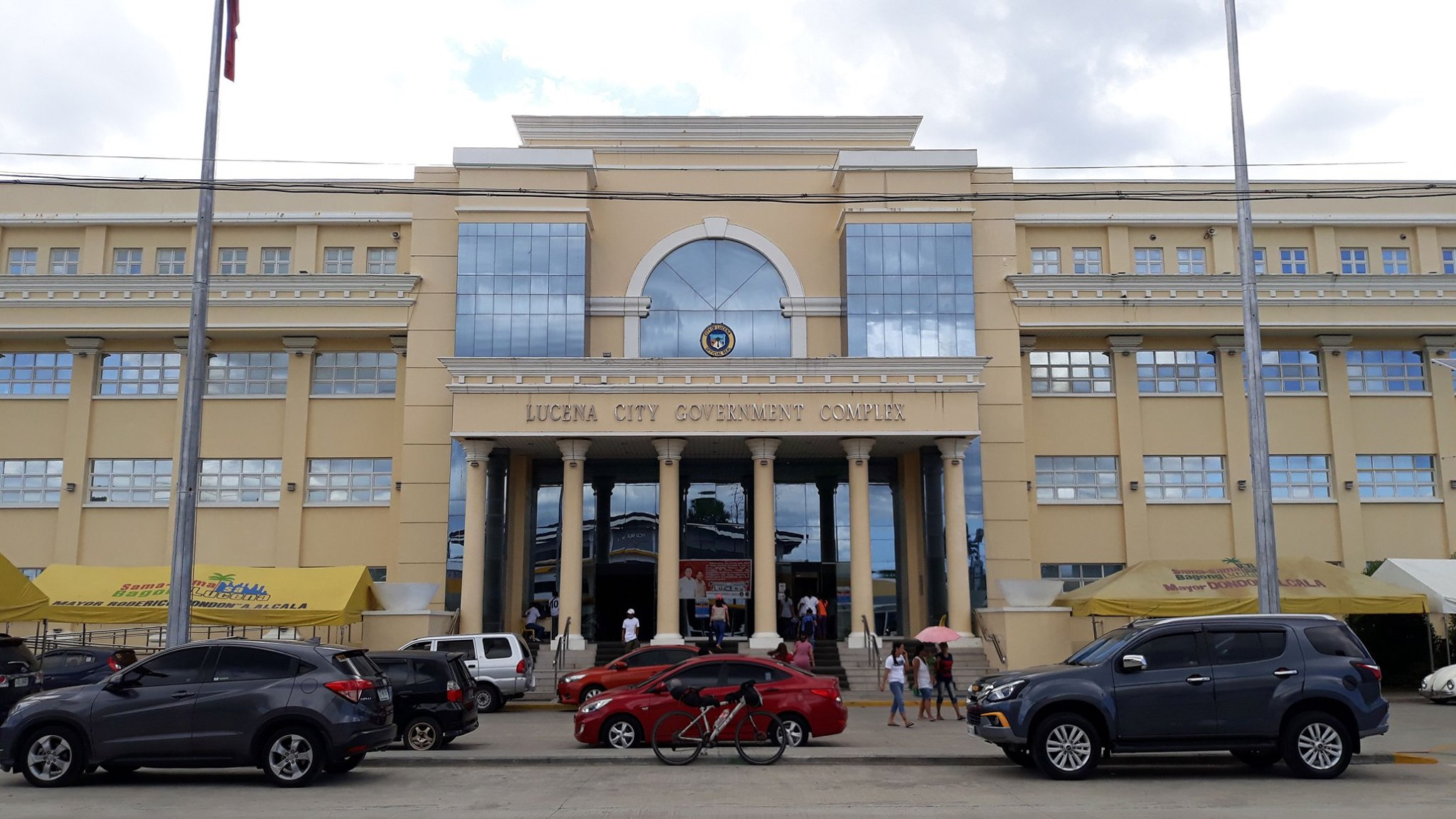
Lucena City Government Complex

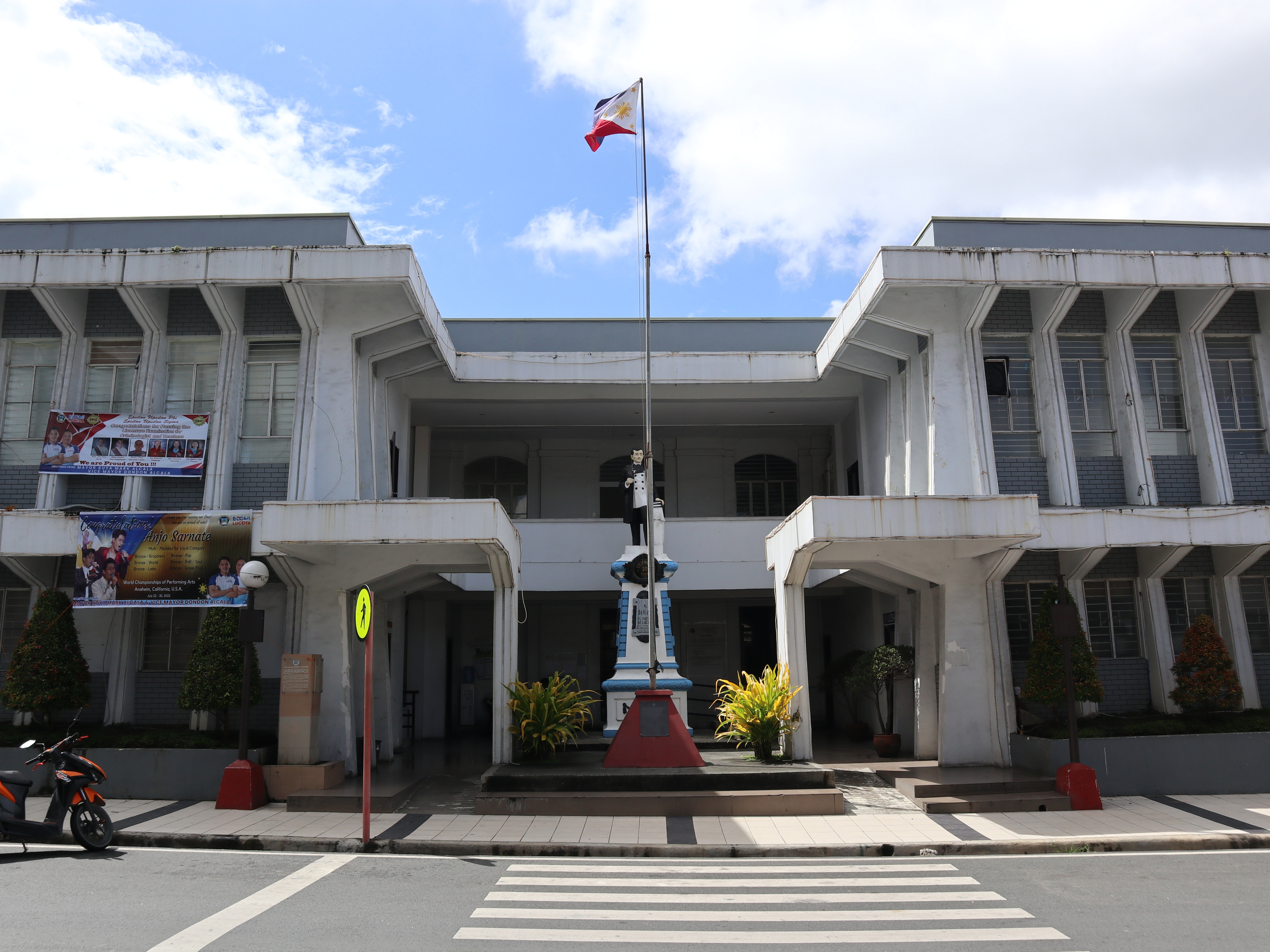
Old Lucena City Hall

As a highly urbanized city, Lucena is independent of the province, but its residents are still allowed by Section 452-C of the Local Government Code of 1991 and its city charter (Republic Act No. 3271) to vote and run in provincial government elections. The provincial government have no political jurisdiction over local transactions of the city government. Residents of this city can also vote and run for provincial board and congressional positions as the city is part of Quezon's 2nd legislative district.

Pursuant to the Local Government Code of 1991, the city of Lucena is to be composed of a mayor (Punong Lungsod), a vice mayor (Pangalawang Punong Lungsod) and members (Kagawad) of the legislative branch Sangguniang Panlungsod alongside a secretary to the said legislature, all of which are elected to a three-year term and are eligible to run for three consecutive terms.

Barangays are also headed by elected officials: Barangay Chairman, Barangay Council, whose members are called Barangay Councilors. The barangays have SK federation which represents the barangay, headed by SK chairperson and whose members are called SK councilors. All officials are also elected every three years.

The current seat of the city government is the Lucena City Government Complex, located along Lucena Diversion Road in Barangay Mayao Kanluran, with some offices still located at the old Lucena City Hall in the poblacion.

=== Elected officials ===
2025-2028 Lucena City Officials
Position	Name	Party
Mayor	Mark Don Victor B. Alcala	Stan Q
Vice Mayor	Roderick A. Alcala	Stan Q
Councilors	Danilo B. Faller	Stan Q
Councilors	Americo Q. Lacerna	Stan Q
Councilors	Wilbert McKinly L. Noche	Stan Q
Councilors	Patrick Norman E. Nadera	Stan Q
Councilors	Benito G. Brizuela Jr.	Stan Q
Councilors	Jose Christian O. Ona	Stan Q
Councilors	Elizabeth U. Sio	Stan Q
Councilors	Ryan Caesar E. Alcala	Independent
Councilors	Rheatia Maria C. Abcede-Llaga	KANP
Councilors	Edwin J. Pureza	Lakas
Ex Officio Municipal Council Members
ABC President	Reil Briones	Nonpartisan
SK Federation President	Rolden C. Garcia	Nonpartisan

=== List of former chief executives ===
Head of the municipality during the Spanish occupation:

- Jorge Zaballero (1896) (Captain Municipal)
- Crisanto Márquez (First Municipal President of Lucena)

Municipal presidents during the American Civil Government:

- Gabriel Cord (1902–1903)
- Gregorio Márquez (1903–1904)
- Juan Carmona (1904–1906)
- Venancio Queblar (1906–1910)
- Feliciano Zoleta (1910–1912)
- Fortunato Álvarez (1912–1916)
- Pedro Nieva (1916–1919, 1919–1922)
- José Nava (1922–1925)
- Venancio Queblar (1925–1928)
- Domingo Gamboa (1928–1931)
- Fernando Barcelona (1931–1934)

Mayors under the Commonwealth Government:

- Federico V. Márquez (1940–1943)
- José Mendoza (1943–1944)
- Teotimo Atienza (1944–1945)

Acting mayors (after World War II):

- Julian Zoleta (April 1945)
- Federico Márquez (May 1945)
- Honorio Abadilla (October 1946)

Elected mayors:

- Amando Zaballero (1947–1952)
- Honorio Abadilla (1952–1955)
- Casto T. Profugo (1955–1960, 1961–1963)
- Mario L. Tagarao (1963–1967, 1967–1971, 1971–1981,1981–1986)
- Euclides Abecedê (May 1986 – November 1987) (appointed)
- Romeo Mendoza (December 4–7, 1987) (appointed)
- Julio T. Alzona (December 8, 1987 – February 7, 1988) (appointed)
- Cesar Zaballero (February 8, 1988 – June 1992)
- Ramon Y. Talaga, Jr. (1992–1995, 1995–1998)
- Bernard G. Tagarao (1998 – May 12, 2000)
- Ramon Y. Talaga, Jr. (May 13, 2000 – June 30, 2010)
- Barbara "Ruby" C. Talaga (2010 – October 2012) (Note: Substitute candidate for the position of Mayor in lieu of her husband Ramon Y. Talaga. As per Supreme Court's en banc decision, the high tribunal refused to issue a temporary restraining order (TRO) that would stop the Comelec from executing a ruling ordering her removal from office (RUBY TALAGA v. COMELEC and RODERICK ALCALA) G.R. No. 196804. The Comelec ruling orders Vice Mayor Roderick Alcala to take over as mayor by order of succession under the Local Government Code.)
- Roderick "Dondon" A. Alcala (November 2012 – 2022)
- Mark Don Victor B. Alcala (2022–Present)

== Infrastructure ==
=== Public transportation ===
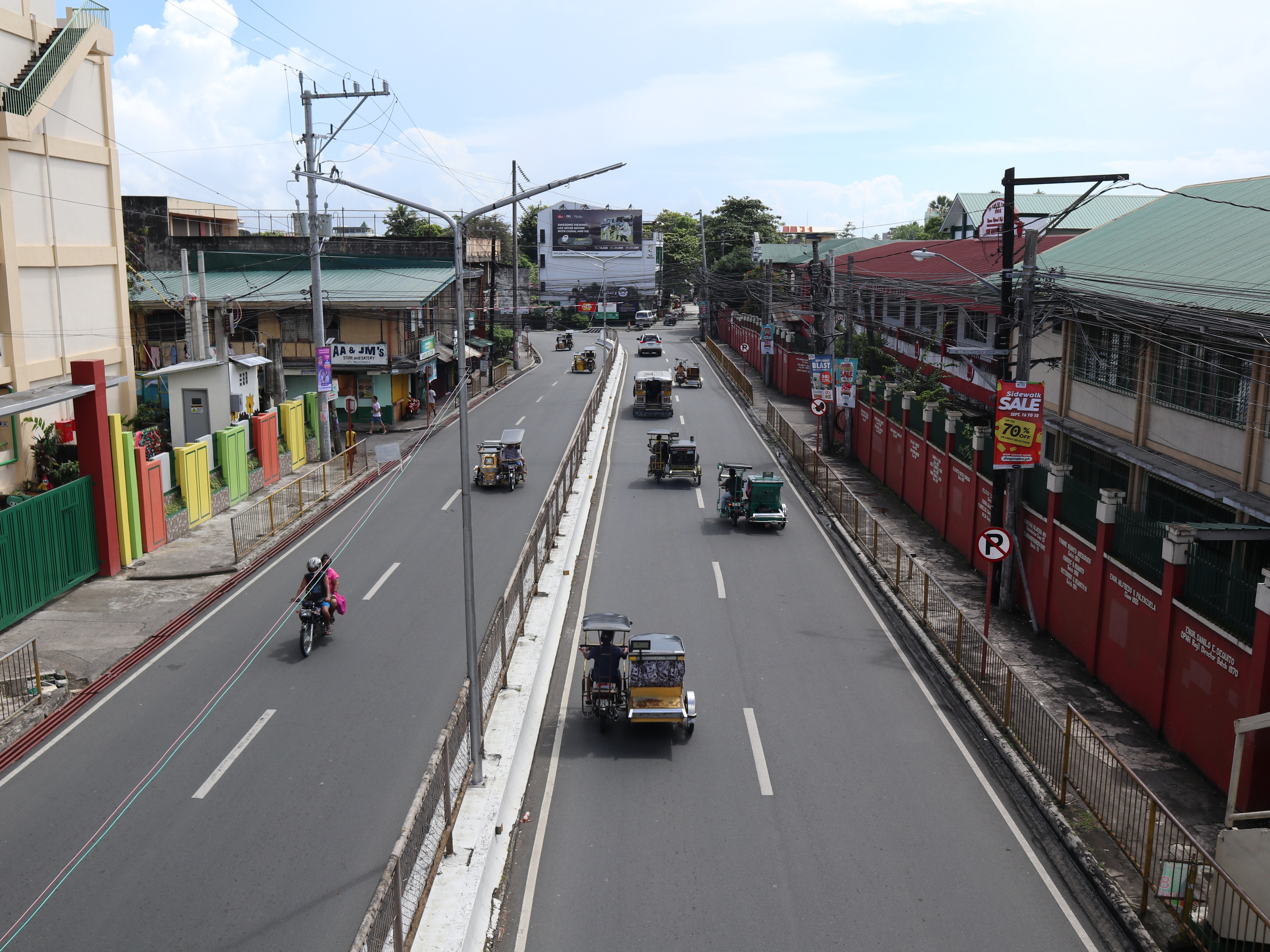
Old Manila South Road

==== Land transportation ====
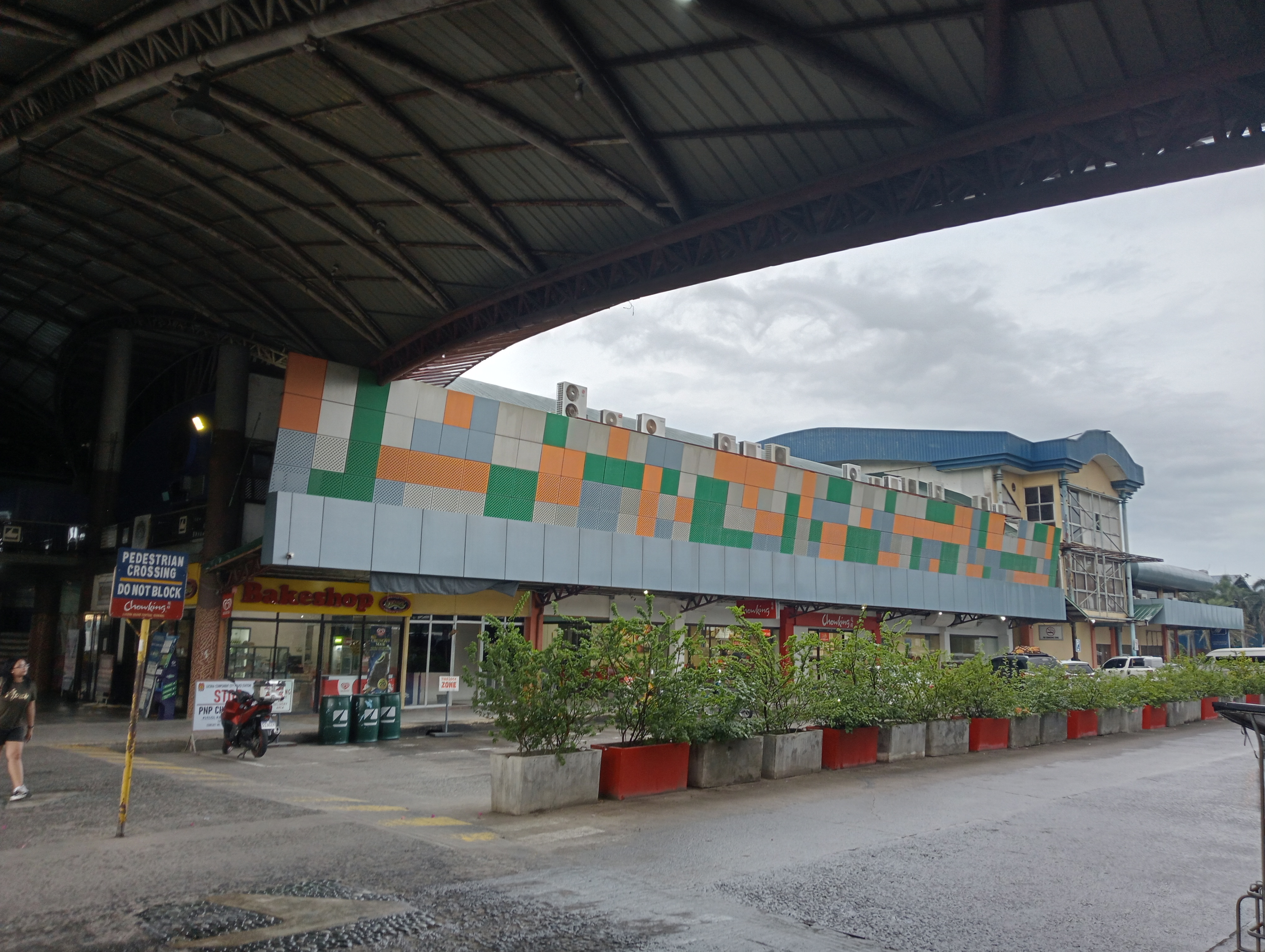
Lucena Grand Central Terminal

Lucena City has a central transportation hub called the Lucena Grand Central Terminal (Lucena GCT), located along Lucena Diversion Road in Barangay Ilayang Dupay. The terminal also hosts the main offices of the Lucena City Land Transportation Office (LTO).

Buses connect Lucena to Pasay, Quezon City, and Alabang in Muntinlupa, while UV Express and van routes connect to Taytay, Pililla, eastern Laguna, and other parts of Quezon, including Bondoc Peninsula towns. Bus companies such as JAC Liner, Lucena Lines, JAM Liner, DLTBCo and Dela Rosa Bus Lines bring passengers to Manila, Cagayan de Oro, Iligan, Mindanao, and Lucena back and forth.

Lucena also has a wide network of jeepney routes, all emanating from the city proper (Bayan) and reaching out to the major barangays of the city, as well as nearby towns.

Thousands of tricycles also roam the streets of the city, bringing passengers right at their point of destination. Due to the large number of tricycles in the area, the local government introduced the Odd-Even Tricycle Reduction Program. Under this program, tricycles are assigned a strict color code to help reduce traffic. Green is designated for those operating in the morning, while yellow is reserved for the afternoon and evening.

The under-construction South Luzon Expressway (SLEX) Toll Road 4 (TR-4) Extension from Calamba, Laguna will end in Lucena at the connection of Maharlika Highway at Barangay Mayao. There is an expressway project to Bicol planned to extend the South Luzon Expressway to Matnog, Sorsogon as SLEX Toll Road 5.

Taxis as also available within the city along with car rental services.

==== Aviation ====
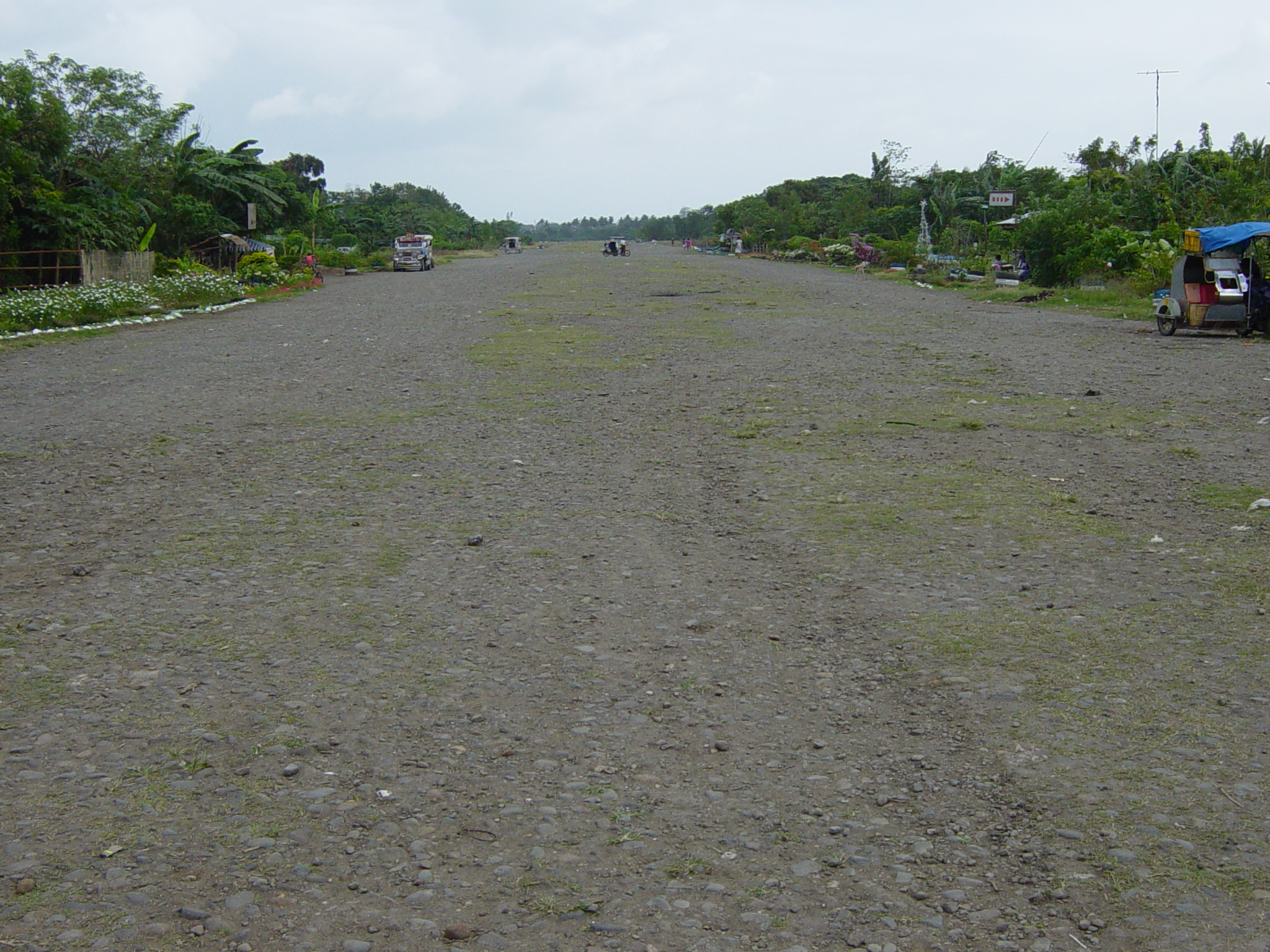
Lucena Airport runway in 2003

There exists a Lucena Airport (known locally as Landing), which is located west of the poblacion. However, it is no longer usable as light aircraft can no longer make use of it and a road was built as an intersection during the presidency of Gloria Macapagal Arroyo.

==== Railways ====
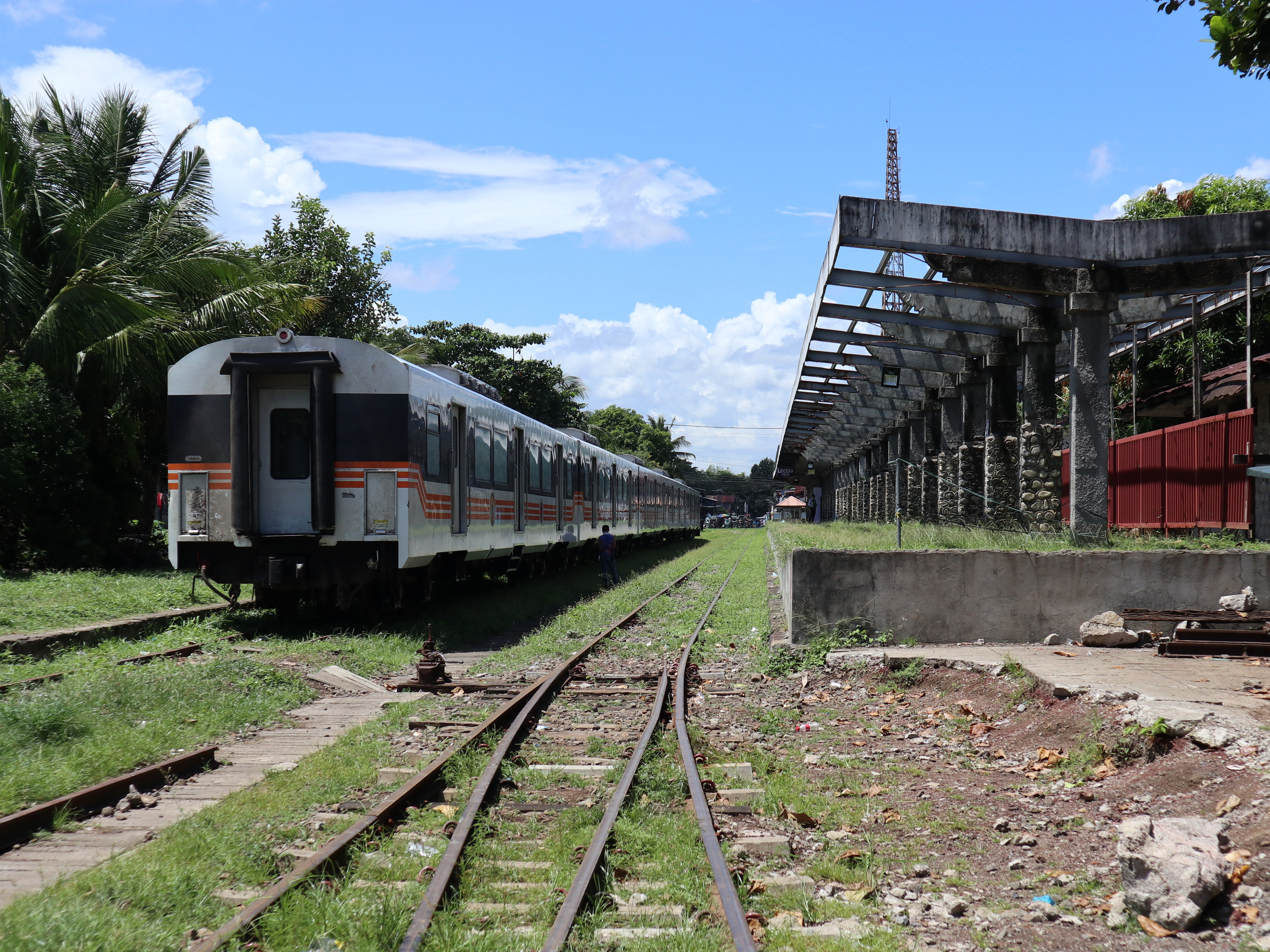
A Philippine National Railways train at Lucena station

The Philippine National Railways (PNR) is on the process of rehabilitating the existing Manila-Bicol and Baguio-Bicol Railway Line, which includes stops in Quezon province, including PNR Lucena station, which traditionally then is a major loading and pick-up point for passengers and cargoes alike when the railway system was once the primary transportation mode going to Manila. Modern air-conditioned coaches will ply this route.

Despite undergoing renovation, Lucena station is still active, servicing passengers to and from San Pablo City daily.

==== Sea transport ====
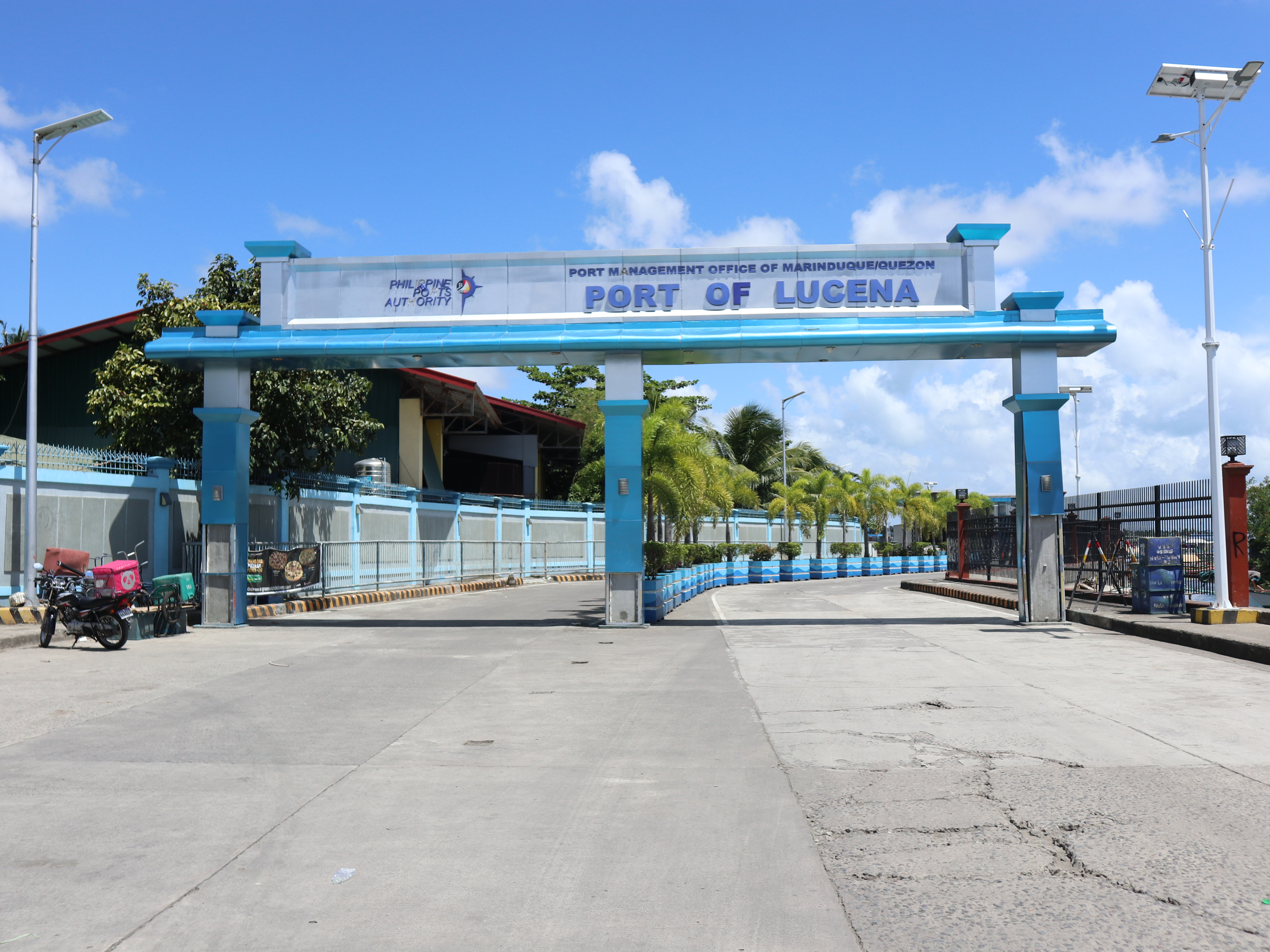
Gate to the Port of Lucena

The Passenger Ferry Terminal in Lucena has RORO vessels that transport passengers across Tayabas Bay to Marinduque, Romblon and Masbate.

The Port of Lucena, located in Dalahican, is known as the gateway and melting pot city of Southern Luzon.

The port complex, built along the fishing village of Barangay Talao-Talao, is a kilometer away to the east of Dalahican Fishing Port. The total port area of TMO Lustacena is 5,174.75 square meters (55,700.5 sq ft). Operational area of 576.00 square meters (6,200.0 sq ft) and commercial area of 4,598.75 square meters (49,500.5 sq ft) as delineated under Executive order No. 199 dated September 20, 1994, signed by then-President Fidel V. Ramos.

The port is accessible via the paved provincial road connecting the Dalahican Road and a rough causeway leading to the port. It is 27 nautical miles (50 km; 31 mi) to Dalahican, and 57 nautical miles (106 km; 66 mi) to Batangas City and sea distance to Manila is 150 nautical miles (280 km; 170 mi). Passenger ferry services include Montenegro Shipping Lines and Star Horse Shipping Lines.

=== Communication ===
Lucena City is served by landline and mobile phone companies like the Philippine Long Distance Telephone Company (PLDT) and Digitel Telecommunications (PLDT-Digitel). Major mobile phone providers in the area include Globe, Smart, DITO Telecommunity, and Asian Vision. Wi-Fi providers like Converge ICT also operate within the city.

=== Hospitals ===
Quezon Medical Center

Lucena has private and public hospitals. Both types of institutions are considered to provide the same standard of healthcare and services, differing mainly with the medical and diagnostic facilities.

Here are the hospitals available in the city:

- Lucena United Memorial District Hospital, 178 Merchan Street
- Lucena MMG General Hospital, Maharlika Highway, Ibabang Dupay
- Mt. Carmel Diocesan General Hospital, Allarey Extension
- Lucena United Doctors Hospital and Medical Center, Barangay Isabang
- St. Anne General Hospital, 51 Gomez Street
- Quezon Medical Center (Quezon Memorial Hospital), QMC Compound, Quezon Avenue
- St. Mary's Hospital, Quezon Avenue
- Quezon MMG Medical Plaza, Quezon Avenue

== Education ==
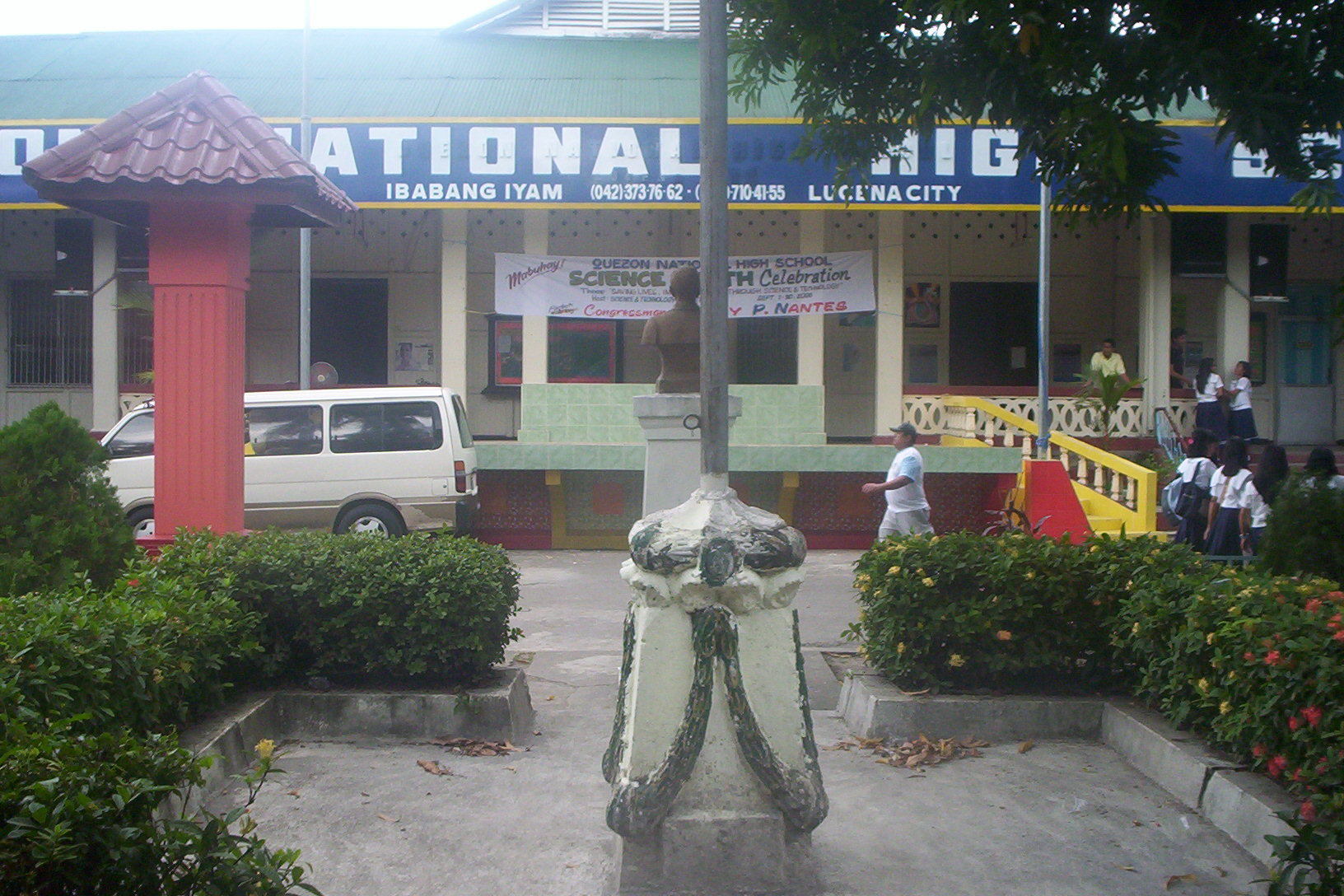
The main building of Quezon National High School

Lucena City has numerous tertiary and secondary schools, including public and private. The tertiary education system in Lucena provides instruction and training in fields of study, both for baccalaureate degrees and vocational courses.

Institutions offering various degree programs including Liberal Arts, Arts and Sciences, Engineering, and Information Technology include the Lucena Campus of the Manuel S. Enverga University Foundation (MSEUF), Sacred Heart College (Lucena), Maryhill College, Southern Luzon State University, St. Anne College Lucena, ABE International College of Business and Economics, Philtech Institute of Arts and Technology Inc. (PIAT), Columbus College-Lucena, AMA Computer College-Lucena, and STI College Lucena.

Aside from tertiary schools, the city also has an expanse footprint on the pre-school, primary and secondary levels of education, both in public and private schools. This includes, but is not limited to, the Holy Rosary Catholic School (HRCS), Bristol Integrated School, Infant Jesus Montessori Center Philippines (IJMCP), St. Philomena School, and the International School for Better Beginnings (ISBB).

Additionally, there are numerous day-care centers found all over the city.

== Notable personalities ==
- Danilo Suarez – Filipino ex governor of Quezon Province; father of David Saurez.
- Aleta Suarez – Filipina ex politician; mother of David Saurez.
- Bonifacio Bosita – Filipino Filipino politician; former 1-Rider Partylist representative and 2025 Philippine senatorial candidate.
- Encarnacion Alzona – Renowned historian and National Scientist of the Philippines. She served as the chairwoman of the National Historical Commission from 1966 to 1967 and was the first Filipino woman to earn a Ph.D.
- Fides Cuyugan-Asensio – National Artist of the Philippines for Music; widely acclaimed for her contributions to the cultural and musical landscape of the nation.
- Jenny Miller – TV & film actress.
- Jessie Dellosa – The 43rd Chief of Staff of the Armed Forces of the Philippines; distinguished military leader.
- Mau Marcelo – The inaugural winner of Philippine Idol.
- Neil Ryan Sese – Film and theatre actor; earned recognition for his versatile and impactful performances across various media.
- Nilo Alcala – Filipino composer; won the 2019 American Prize in Composition. Alcala is the first Philippine-born composer to be commissioned by the Grammy Award-winning Los Angeles Master Chorale and to receive the Aaron Copland House Residency Award. In 2021, he was named Natatanging Lucenahin.
- Paz Márquez-Benítez – Filipina short-story writer; celebrated for her literary contributions.
- Proceso Alcala – Filipino politician and 12th Secretary of the Department of Agriculture.
- Zaijian Jaranilla - Filipino actor and model having primary allegiance with ABS-CBN Corporation under Star Magic and secondary allegiance conditionally with other media companies (GMA Network and TV5 Network) who is best known for his role as the orphan Santino in the 2009–2013 ABS-CBN religious-themed teleserye, May Bukas Pa.
- Zymic Jaranilla - Zaijian Jaranilla's sibling who originally worked with ABS-CBN briefly and currently a GMA Network contract artist.

== Sister cities ==
- Tayabas City, Philippines
- General Santos, Philippines
- Calabanga, Camarines Sur, Philippines
- Cabanatuan, Philippines
- Iligan, Philippines
- Cagayan de Oro, Philippines

== Notes ==
Preceded by Tayabas	Capital of Quezon; Capital of Tayabas (until 1946); 1901–present	Incumbent
