= 1-Rider Partylist =

Political party in the Philippines

1-Rider
- — Philippine partylist —
- Full name: Ang Buklod ng mga Motorista ng Pilipinas
- President: Jose Marcial Villanueva
- Type: Sectoral party
- Sector(s) represented: Motorists
- Colors: Orange
- Slogan: Basta Tama, Kampi Kampi Tayo! (transl. As long as we're right, we're all united)

Current representation (20th Congress)
- Seats in the House of Representatives: 1 / 3 (Out of 63 party-list seats)
- Representative(s): Rodge Gutierrez

Ang Buklod ng mga Motorista ng Pilipinas (lit. 'Union of Motorists of the Philippines'), also known as the 1-Rider Partylist, is a political organization with party-list representation in the House of Representatives of the Philippines.

== Background ==
The 1-Rider Partylist started out as a rider's club based in Bicol which would organize charity rides and provide legal aid to riders. The group later partnered with the Riders' Safety Advocates of the Philippines (RSAP) of Bonifacio Bosita and decided to launch a bid in the 2022 elections to get party-list representation in the House of Representatives.

1-Rider's first nominee is Rodge Gutierrez, a lawyer while its second nominee is Bonifacio Bosita, RSAP founder and a retired police colonel who featured in an altercation with a Metropolitan Manila Development Authority (MMDA) traffic enforcer in March 2021 which became subject of a viral video. He disputed the enforcer's action of filing a ticket against a couple driving in tandem on a motorcycle for breaking a shoes-only policy – while the driver was wearing shoes the backseat woman passenger was penalized for wearing slippers causing her to miss a day of work. Bosita made the enforcer reimburse the money the passenger lost for missing a day of work. MMDA traffic czar Edison Bong Nebrija in response alleged that Bosita was exploiting traffic enforcers for political gain.

1-Rider Partylist intends to represent motorists and their rights in the Congress. The organization's platform includes improving road safety and protecting motorists from abusive traffic enforcers. 1-Rider took part in the 2022 Philippine elections.

1-Rider managed to secure two seats in the House of Representatives.

== Electoral results ==
Election	Votes	%	Secured Seats	Party-list Seats	Congress	1st Representative	2nd Representative
2022	1,001,243	2.72%	2 / 3	63	19th Congress; 2022–2025	Rodge Gutierrez	Bonifacio Bosita
2025	385,700	0.92%	1 / 3	63	20th Congress; 2025–2028	Rodge Gutierrez	—
Note: For party-list representation in the House of Representatives of the Philippines, a party can win a maximum of three seats.
