= Rodge Gutierrez =

Filipino lawyer and politician (born 1993)

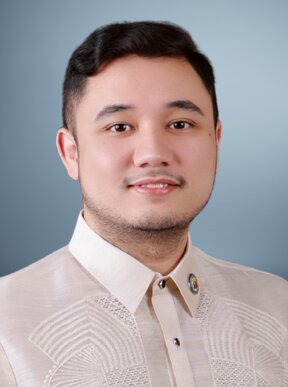
- Official portrait, 2025

Member of the Philippine House of Representatives for the 1-Rider Partylist
- Incumbent
- Assumed office June 30, 2022

Personal details
- Born: Ramon Rodrigo Lorejo Gutierrez; October 6, 1993 (age 32)
- Party: 1-Rider Partylist
- Occupation: Lawyer; politician

Ramon Rodrigo "Rodge" Lorejo Gutierrez (born October 6, 1993) is a Filipino lawyer and politician who has served as the representative for 1-Rider Partylist since 2022.

== Early life and education ==
Gutierrez was born on October 6, 1993.

He studied law and earned his BS Management major in Legal Management and Juris Doctor (JD) degree at Ateneo de Manila University. He later passed the Philippine Bar Examination, becoming a licensed lawyer. He later became a legal counsel of Gutierrez Law Office and legal officer of the Party-list Coalition Foundation.

== House of Representatives ==
Gutierrez was elected to the House of Representatives in 2022, representing the 1-Rider Partylist.

== Electoral history ==
Electoral history of Rodge Gutierrez
Year	Office	Party	Votes received				Result
Year	Office	Party	Total	%	P.	Swing	Result
2022	Representative (Party-list)	1-Rider	1,001,243	2.75%	2nd	—N/a	Won
2025	Representative (Party-list)	1-Rider	385,700	0.97%	28th	—N/a	Won
